= 1948–49 Svenska mästerskapet (men's handball) =

Swedish handball tournament

Svenska mästerskapet
- 1948–49

Tournament information
- Sport: Handball
- Teams: 32

Final positions
- Champions: IFK Lidingö (1st title)
- Runner-up: SoIK Hellas

The 1948–49 Svenska mästerskapet was the 18th season of Svenska mästerskapet, a tournament held to determine the Swedish Champions of men's handball. The tournament was contested by all Allsvenskan teams and all District Champions, along with invited teams from Division II. 32 teams competed in the tournament. IFK Kristianstad were the defending champions, but were eliminated by IFK Lidingö in the semifinals. IFK Lidingö won the title, defeating cross-town rivals SoIK Hellas in the final. The semifinals and final were played on 19–20 March in Eriksdalshallen in Stockholm. The final was watched by 1,403 spectators.

== Results ==
=== First Round ===
- Norrköpings AIS–IFK Lidingö 9–13
- Näsby IF–IFK Karlskrona 9–8
- Skövde AIK–Jönköpings BK 13–5
- Sollefteå GIF–IFK Östersund 15–7
- Sandvikens IF–Kubikenborg 35–2
- Upsala Studenters IF–Norslunds IF 24–9
- IFK Kristianstad–IFK Hässleholm 13–9
- F 11 Nyköping–Västerås HF 20–19
- AIK–Västerås IK 8–6
- Örebro SK–IF Hellton 21–8
- Umeå IK–Luleå SK 10–4
- Visby IF–SoIK Hellas 14–21
- GF Kroppskultur–Majornas IK 10–24
- HK Drott–IK Heim 15–14
- IFK Malmö–Ystads IF 9–11
- Redbergslids IK–Göteborgs BIS 12–8

=== Second Round ===
- IFK Lidingö–Näsby IF 17–11
- Skövde AIK–Sollefteå GIF 17–8
- Sandvikens IF–Upsala Studenters IF 14–8
- IFK Kristianstad–F 11 Nyköping 12–10
- AIK–Örebro SK 13–8
- Umeå IK–SoIK Hellas 6–7
- Majornas IK–HK Drott 14–8
- Ystads IF–Redbergslids IK 9–8

=== Quarterfinals ===
- IFK Lidingö–Skövde AIK 14–8
- Sandvikens IF–IFK Kristianstad 14–17
- AIK–SoIK Hellas 8–15
- Majornas IK–Ystads IF 17–11

=== Semifinals ===
- IFK Lidingö–IFK Kristianstad 9–6
- SoIK Hellas–Majornas IK 11–9

=== Match for third place ===
- Majornas IK–IFK Kristianstad 14–10

=== Final ===
- IFK Lidingö–SoIK Hellas 7–4

== Champions ==
The following players for IFK Lidingö received a winner's medal: Arne Lindecrantz, Erik Ek (3 goals in the final), Lars Eriksson (2), Bengt Arenander, Roland Hagen (2), Lars-Eric Johansson, Lennart Hedberg, Claes Kåhre, Harry Larnefeldt and Axel Eriksson.

== See also ==
1948–49 Allsvenskan (men's handball)
