= 1951–52 Svenska mästerskapet (men's handball) =

Handball tournament in Sweden

Svenska mästerskapet
- 1951–52

Tournament information
- Sport: Handball
- Teams: 32

Final positions
- Champions: IFK Kristianstad (3rd title)
- Runner-up: AIK

The 1950–51 Svenska mästerskapet was the 21st and final season of Svenska mästerskapet, a tournament held to determine the Swedish Champions of men's handball. Starting in the following season, the title of Swedish Champions would be awarded to the winners of Allsvenskan. The tournament was contested by all Allsvenskan teams and all District Champions, along with invited teams from Division II. 32 teams competed in the tournament. AIK were the defending champions, but were defeated by IFK Kristianstad in the final. IFK Kristianstad won their third title. The final was played in Sporthallen in Kristianstad and was watched by 1,272 spectators.

== Results ==
=== First round ===
- Bodens BK–Sandåkern SK 11–14
- Ludvika FfI–Upsala Studenters IF 11–9
- Sollefteå GIF–Västerås HF 6–17
- Heffners IF–Sandvikens IF 5–26
- AIK–GUIF 20–4
- IFK Lidingö–F 11 IF 12–10
- Västerås IK–Norrköpings AIS 9–15
- IF Gute–SoIK Hellas 7–19
- Karlstads BIK–IK Heim 16–13
- Skövde AIK–Redbergslids IK 13–12
- GF Kroppskultur–IK Baltichov 16–23
- Majornas IK–Örebro SK 13–12
- Växjö BK–IFK Karlskrona 8–10
- IFK Trelleborg–HK Drott 24–5
- Näsby IF–Jönköpings Södra IF 10–7
- IFK Malmö–IFK Kristianstad 12–13

=== Second round ===
- Västerås HF–IFK Lidingö 18–12
- Sandåkern SK–AIK 5–9
- Sandvikens IF–Ludvika FfI 20–4
- Norrköpings AIS–Näsby IF 8–10
- SoIK Hellas–Skövde AIK 9–6
- IK Baltichov–Karlstads BIK 14–13
- IFK Karlskrona–Majornas IK 20–17
- IFK Kristianstad–IFK Trelleborg 19–15

=== Quarterfinals ===
- AIK–Västerås HF 10–3
- IFK Karlskrona–SoIK Hellas 8–10
- Näsby IF–IK Baltichov 12–10
- Sandvikens IF–IFK Kristianstad 10–17

=== Semifinals ===
- IFK Kristianstad–Näsby IF 16–9
- AIK–SoIK Hellas 13–12 a.e.t.

=== Final ===
- IFK Kristianstad–AIK 16–15 a.e.t.

== Champions ==
The following players for IFK Kristianstad received a winner's medal: Pelle Svensson, Carl Fridlundh (5 goals in the final), Carl-Erik Stockenberg (2), Bertil Rönndahl (1), Evert Sjunnesson (1), Erik Nordström (2), Åke Moberg (4), Ingvar Svensson (1), Åke Skough and Uno Kvist.

== See also ==
1951–52 Allsvenskan (men's handball)
