= 1950–51 Svenska mästerskapet (men's handball) =

Handball tournament in Sweden

Svenska mästerskapet
- 1950–51

Tournament information
- Sport: Handball
- Teams: 32

Final positions
- Champions: AIK (1st title)
- Runner-up: IFK Kristianstad

The 1950–51 Svenska mästerskapet was the 20th season of Svenska mästerskapet, a tournament to determine the Swedish Champions of men's handball. The tournament was contested by all Allsvenskan teams and all District Champions, along with invited teams from Division II. 32 teams competed in the tournament. IK Heim were the defending champions, but were eliminated by Örebro SK in the quarterfinals. Division II team AIK won the title, defeating IFK Kristianstad in the final. The final was played on 18 March in Eriksdalshallen in Stockholm and was watched by 1,784 spectators.

== Results ==
=== First Round ===
- Sandåkerns SK–Hornskrokens IF 11–8
- Sollefteå GIF–IFK Östersund 17–10
- IFK Karlskrona–Näsby IF 8–10
- AIK–F 11 Nyköping 15–4
- Karlstads BIK–Norrköpings AIS 14–16
- Västerås IK–Ludvika FfI 20–2
- Redbergslids IK–Jönköping Södra 15–2
- IFK Borås–IK Baltichov 11–12
- Örebro SK–Sandvikens IF 14–11
- IFK Lidingö–Visby IF 20–4
- IK Heim–Uddevalla IS 12–7
- Majornas IK–Skövde AIK 13–10
- HK Drott–IFK Trelleborg 8–9
- IFK Kristianstad–IFK Malmö 13–11
- Västerås HF–Motala AIF w/o
- Upsala Studenters IF–SoIK Hellas 7–11

=== Second Round ===
- Sandåkerns SK–Sollefteå GIF 8–4
- Näsby IF–AIK 10–11
- Norrköpings AIS–Västerås IK 13–14
- Redbergslids IK–IK Baltichov 17–11
- Örebro SK–IFK Lidingö 18–8
- IK Heim–Majornas IK 13–11
- IFK Trelleborg–IFK Kristianstad 7–13
- Västerås HF–SoIK Hellas 10–5

=== Quarterfinals ===
- Sandåkerns SK–AIK 9–12
- Västerås IK–Redbergslids IK 15–12
- Örebro SK–IK Heim 11–9
- IFK Kristianstad–Västerås HF 24–6

=== Semifinals ===
- AIK–Västerås IK 11–6
- Örebro SK–IFK Kristianstad 12–20

=== Final ===
- AIK–IFK Kristianstad 12–11

== Champions ==
The following players for AIK received a winner's medal: Stig Hultman, Bengt Lithander, Hans Möller (1), Evert Djupmark, Svante Malmgren (6), Kjell Jönsson (1), Bengt Jönsson (2), Rune Östberg (1), Sven Holmgren (1) and Bengt Enhamre.

== See also ==
1950–51 Allsvenskan (men's handball)
