= 1949–50 Svenska mästerskapet (men's handball) =

Handball competition in Sweden

Svenska mästerskapet
- 1949–50

Tournament information
- Sport: Handball
- Teams: 32

Final positions
- Champions: IK Heim (1st title)
- Runner-up: Örebro SK

The 1949–50 Svenska mästerskapet was the 19th season of Svenska mästerskapet, a tournament held to determine the Swedish Champions of men's handball. The tournament was contested by all Allsvenskan teams and all District Champions, along with invited teams from Division II. 32 teams competed in the tournament. IFK Lidingö were the defending champions, but were eliminated by Västerås HF in the First Round. IK Heim won the title, defeating Örebro SK in the final. The semifinals and final were played on 25–26 March in Örebro. The final was watched by 1,857 spectators.

== Results ==
=== First round ===
- IF Guif–Västerås IK 8–9
- Norslunds IF–Gävle GIK 9–15
- Sandåkerns SK–Sollefteå GIF 7–5
- Örebro SK–Karlstads BIK 22–11
- HS Sierra–Redbergslids IK 9–15
- IFK Lidingö–Västerås HF 9–13
- IFK Trelleborg–IFK Malmö 16–16 a.e.t.
- IFK Trelleborg–IFK Malmö 10–15 (replay)
- Majornas IK–Skövde AIK 13–8
- Motala AIF–IFK Kristianstad 7–9
- IFK Falkenberg–IK Baltichov 6–17
- IFK Östersund–IFK Sundsvall 16–13
- Luleå SK–SoIK Hellas 9–14
- Visby IF–AIK 13–17
- F 11 Nyköping–IFK Uppsala 14–11
- GF Kroppskultur–IK Heim 4–11
- F12 Kalmar–IFK Karlskrona 11–17

=== Second round ===
- Västerås IK–Gävle GIK 14–9
- Sandåkerns SK–Örebro SK 4–13
- Redbergslids IK–Västerås HF 10–11
- IFK Malmö–Majornas IK 11–8
- IFK Kristianstad–IK Baltichov 10–12
- IFK Östersund–SoIK Hellas 6–11
- AIK–F 11 Nyköping 12–8
- IK Heim–IFK Karlskrona 18–12

=== Quarterfinals ===
- Västerås IK–Örebro SK 10–13
- Västerås HF–IFK Malmö 9–6
- IK Baltichov–SoIK Hellas 5–14
- AIK–IK Heim 7–14

=== Semifinals ===
- Örebro SK–Västerås HF 14–6
- SoIK Hellas–IK Heim 7–8

=== Match for third place ===
- SoIK Hellas–Västerås HF 11–10

=== Final ===
- Örebro SK–IK Heim 6–9

== Champions ==
The following players for IK Heim received a winner's medal: Gunnar Brusberg, Kurt Karlsson, Elof Kjellman (1), Rolf Zachrisson (2), Lennart Lindgren, Folke Fredriksson (2), Gunnar Holmqvist (3), Rolf Andreasson, Rolf Olsson (1), Bernt Berndtsson.

== See also ==
1949–50 Allsvenskan (men's handball)
