= 1947–48 Svenska mästerskapet (men's handball) =

Swedish handball tournament

Svenska mästerskapet
- 1947–48

Tournament information
- Sport: Handball
- Teams: 32

Final positions
- Champions: IFK Kristianstad (2nd title)
- Runner-up: Redbergslids IK

The 1947–48 Svenska mästerskapet was the 17th season of Svenska mästerskapet, a tournament held to determine the Swedish Champions of men's handball. The tournament was contested by all Allsvenskan teams and all District Champions, along with invited teams from Division II. 32 teams competed in the tournament. Redbergslids IK were the defending champions, but were defeated by IFK Kristianstad in the final. IFK Kristianstad won their second title. The semifinals and final were played on 20–21 March in Sporthallen in Kristianstad. The final was watched by 1,628 spectators.

== Results ==
=== First Round ===
- IFK Luleå–Sollefteå GIF 9–15
- Upsala Studenters IF–SoIK Hellas 9–10
- Umeå IK–IFK Sundsvall 14–8
- Norrköpings AIS–F 11 Nyköping 7–8
- Uddevalla IS–Skövde AIK 9–22
- Karlstads BIK–Majornas IK 11–10
- Norslunds IF–Sandvikens IF 8–18
- Halmstads HBP–Redbergslids IK 9–15
- Jönköpings BK–IFK Kristianstad 6–8
- Örebro SK–IFK Lidingö 11–6
- Hallstahammars SK–Västerås HF 9–12
- IFK Östersund–Gävle GIK 13–17
- IFK Malmö–IK Heim 11–12
- IFK Karlskrona–Ystads IF 13–8
- IK Göta–Västerås IK 6–12
- Visby IF–Spårvägens HF 11–15

=== Second Round ===
- Sollefteå GIF–SoIK Hellas 7–18
- Umeå IK–F 11 Nyköping 6–14
- Skövde AIK–Karlstads BIK 5–8
- Sandvikens IF–Redbergslids IK 4–13
- IFK Kristianstad–Örebro SK 12–9
- Västerås HF–Gävle GIK 14–7
- IK Heim–IFK Karlskrona 4–6
- Västerås IK–Spårvägens HF 13–7

=== Quarterfinals ===
- SoIK Hellas–F 11 Nyköping 9–7
- Karlstads BIK–Redbergslids IK 5–10
- IFK Kristianstad–Västerås HF 10–5
- IFK Karlskrona–Västerås IK 5–6

=== Semifinals ===
- SoIK Hellas–Redbergslids IK 3–14
- IFK Kristianstad–Västerås IK 12–10

=== Match for third place ===
- Västerås IK–SoIK Hellas 9–6

=== Final ===
- IFK Kristianstad–Redbergslids IK 8–7 a.e.t.

== Champions ==
The following players for IFK Kristianstad received a winner's medal: Bertil Andersson, Göte Pålsson, Carl-Erik Stockenberg (2 goals in the final), Bertil Rönndahl, Evert Sjunnesson, Erik Nordström (2), Åke Moberg (3), Göte Saloonen, Axel Nissen and Åke Skough (1).

== See also ==
1947–48 Allsvenskan (men's handball)
