= 1946–47 Svenska mästerskapet (men's handball) =

Swedish handball tournament

Svenska mästerskapet
- 1946–47

Tournament information
- Sport: Handball
- Teams: 32

Final positions
- Champions: Redbergslids IK (3rd title)
- Runner-up: IK Heim

The 1946–47 Svenska mästerskapet was the 16th season of Svenska mästerskapet, a tournament held to determine the Swedish Champions of men's handball. The qualification criteria for the tournament was changed for this season. All Allsvenskan teams and all District Champions qualified, along with invited teams from Division II. 32 teams competed in the tournament. Majornas IK were the five-time defending champions, but were eliminated by Sandvikens IF in the Second Round. Redbergslids IK won their third title, defeating cross-town rivals IK Heim in the final. The semifinals and final were played on 15–16 March in Mässhallen in Gothenburg. The final was watched by 4,198 spectators.

== Results ==
=== First Round ===
- Bodens BK–Umeå IK 9–19
- Upsala Studenters IF–IK Göta 14–10
- Ludvika FFI–SoIK Hellas 8–23
- Motala AIF–KA 3 Fårösund 13–12
- Sandvikens IF–GIF Sundsvall 21–5
- Majornas IK–F 11 Nyköping 21–10
- GF Kroppskultur–IK Heim 9–15
- IFK Malmö–IFK Karlskrona 10–11
- Sollefteå GIF–IFK Östersund 18–14
- Rynninge IK–Redbergslids IK 4–18
- Skövde AIK–Karlstads BIK 16–7
- IFK Lidingö–Västerås IK result unknown
- Västerås HF–IF Guif 14–8
- Lugi HF–IFK Eksjö result unknown
- IFK Trelleborg–Ystads IF 3–10
- HK Drott–IFK Kristianstad 13–18

=== Second Round ===
- Umeå IK–Upsala Studenters IF 9–8
- SoIK Hellas–Motala AIF 19–8
- Sandvikens IF–Majornas IK 15–10
- IK Heim–IFK Karlskrona 9–8
- Sollefteå GIF–Redbergslids IK 5–18
- Skövde AIK–IFK Lidingö 10–8
- Västerås HF–Lugi HF 13–11
- Ystads IF–IFK Kristianstad 17–13

=== Quarterfinals ===
- Umeå IK–SoIK Hellas 7–10
- Sandvikens IF–IK Heim 7–8
- Redbergslids IK–Skövde AIK 10–8
- Västerås HF–Ystads IF 8–10

=== Semifinals ===
- SoIK Hellas–IK Heim 9–15
- Redbergslids IK–Ystads IF 12–9

=== Match for third place ===
- SoIK Hellas–Ystads IF 8–6

=== Final ===
- IK Heim–Redbergslids IK 7–8

== Champions ==
The following players for Redbergslids IK received a winner's medal: Henry Öberg, Valter Larsson (1 goal in the final), Lars-Eric Olsson, Gösta Swerin (1), Rolf Andreasson (2), Sten Åkerstedt (2), Olle Juthage (2), Kimfors, Bertil Lundberg and Holger Karlsson.

== See also ==
- 1946–47 Allsvenskan (men's handball)
