= 1949–50 Allsvenskan (men's handball) =

Swedish handball season

Allsvenskan
- 1949–50

Tournament information
- Sport: Handball
- Teams: 10

Final positions
- Champions: IFK Kristianstad

The 1949–50 Allsvenskan was the 16th season of the top division of Swedish handball. 10 teams competed in the league. IFK Kristianstad won the league, but the title of Swedish Champions was awarded to the winner of Svenska mästerskapet. IFK Karlskrona and F 11 IF were relegated.

== League table ==
Pos	Team	Pld	W	D	L	GF	GA	GD	Pts
1	IFK Kristianstad	18	12	3	3	210	161	49	27
2	Redbergslids IK	18	11	2	5	207	164	43	24
3	SoIK Hellas	18	8	3	7	172	172	0	19
4	Örebro SK	18	9	0	9	185	171	14	18
5	IK Heim	18	7	4	7	174	162	12	18
6	Majornas IK	18	7	4	7	195	193	2	18
7	Västerås IK	18	7	3	8	189	192	−3	17
8	IFK Malmö	18	7	3	8	161	194	−33	17
9	IFK Karlskrona	18	7	2	9	201	192	9	16
10	F 11 IF	18	1	4	13	168	261	−93	6

== Attendance ==
Team	Attendance
Redbergslids IK	2523
Majornas IK	2290
IFK Kristianstad	2115
IK Heim	1788
Örebro SK	1770
IFK Malmö	1608
SoIK Hellas	1323
IFK Karlskrona	1073
Västerås IK	770
F 11 IF	405
