= 1942–43 Allsvenskan (men's handball) =

Swedish handball season

Allsvenskan
- 1942–43

Tournament information
- Sport: Handball
- Teams: 9

Final positions
- Champions: Majornas IK

The 1942–43 Allsvenskan was the ninth season of the top division of Swedish handball. Nine teams competed in the league. Majornas IK won the league, but the title of Swedish Champions was awarded to the winner of Svenska mästerskapet. Västerås IK were relegated.

== League table ==
Pos	Team	Pld	W	D	L	GF	GA	GD	Pts
1	Majornas IK	16	12	1	3	219	140	79	25
2	SoIK Hellas	16	11	1	4	132	105	27	23
3	Redbergslids IK	16	9	0	7	152	145	7	18
4	IFK Karlskrona	16	8	2	6	156	155	1	18
5	Västerås HF	16	8	2	6	142	148	−6	18
6	Sanna IF	16	6	0	10	135	150	−15	12
7	Stockholms-Flottans IF	16	6	0	10	128	145	−17	12
8	IFK Malmö	16	5	0	11	125	166	−41	10
9	Västerås IK	16	3	2	11	131	166	−35	8

== Attendance ==
Team	Attendance
Majornas IK	3208
Redbergslids IK	2683
SoIK Hellas	1532
Sanna IF	1423
Stockholms-Flottans IF	1313
IFK Malmö	1305
Västerås HF	1137
Västerås IK	1109
IFK Karlskrona	1044
