= 1950–51 Allsvenskan (men's handball) =

Swedish handball season

Allsvenskan
- 1950–51

Tournament information
- Sport: Handball
- Teams: 10

Final positions
- Champions: Örebro SK

The 1950–51 Allsvenskan was the 17th season of the top division of Swedish handball. 10 teams competed in the league. Örebro SK won the league, but the title of Swedish Champions was awarded to the winner of Svenska mästerskapet. Västerås IK and IFK Malmö were relegated.

== League table ==
| Pos | Team | Pld | W | D | L | GF | GA | GD | Pts |
|---|---|---|---|---|---|---|---|---|---|
| 1 | Örebro SK | 18 | 13 | 2 | 3 | 223 | 145 | 78 | 28 |
| 2 | IK Heim | 18 | 12 | 3 | 3 | 212 | 158 | 54 | 27 |
| 3 | IFK Kristianstad | 18 | 13 | 1 | 4 | 247 | 205 | 42 | 27 |
| 4 | Redbergslids IK | 18 | 9 | 5 | 4 | 212 | 186 | 26 | 23 |
| 5 | IFK Borås | 18 | 7 | 2 | 9 | 200 | 245 | −45 | 16 |
| 6 | SoIK Hellas | 18 | 6 | 1 | 11 | 159 | 184 | −25 | 13 |
| 7 | Näsby IF | 18 | 6 | 1 | 11 | 196 | 227 | −31 | 13 |
| 8 | Majornas IK | 18 | 5 | 2 | 11 | 194 | 214 | −20 | 12 |
| 9 | Västerås IK | 18 | 5 | 1 | 12 | 184 | 239 | −55 | 11 |
| 10 | IFK Malmö | 18 | 4 | 2 | 12 | 181 | 205 | −24 | 10 |

== Attendance ==
| Team | Attendance |
|---|---|
| IK Heim | 2159 |
| Redbergslids IK | 2005 |
| Örebro SK | 1873 |
| Majornas IK | 1862 |
| IFK Kristianstad | 1772 |
| Näsby IF | 1534 |
| IFK Malmö | 1350 |
| SoIK Hellas | 1112 |
| Västerås IK | 766 |
| IFK Borås | 764 |
