= 1951–52 Allsvenskan (men's handball) =

Swedish handball season

Allsvenskan
- 1951–52

Tournament information
- Sport: Handball
- Teams: 10

Final positions
- Champions: IFK Kristianstad

The 1951–52 Allsvenskan was the 18th season of the top division of Swedish handball and the final season where the league did not determine the Swedish Champions. 10 teams competed in the league. IFK Kristianstad won the league, but the title of Swedish Champions was awarded to the winner of Svenska mästerskapet. SoIK Hellas and IK Baltichov were relegated.

== League table ==
Pos	Team	Pld	W	D	L	GF	GA	GD	Pts
1	IFK Kristianstad	18	12	2	4	230	197	33	26
2	Örebro SK	18	12	0	6	216	158	58	24
3	IFK Karlskrona	18	10	3	5	226	211	15	23
4	IFK Borås	18	9	2	7	206	201	5	20
5	Redbergslids IK	18	7	5	6	221	203	18	19
6	IK Heim	18	7	5	6	188	174	14	19
7	Näsby IF	18	8	1	9	178	194	−16	17
8	Majornas IK	18	6	2	10	176	201	−25	14
9	SoIK Hellas	18	4	2	12	152	190	−38	10
10	IK Baltichov	18	4	0	14	161	225	−64	8

== Attendance ==
Team	Attendance
Redbergslids IK	1581
IFK Kristianstad	1551
Örebro SK	1534
Majornas IK	1333
Näsby IF	1299
IK Heim	1190
IFK Karlskrona	959
IK Baltichov	819
IFK Borås	744
SoIK Hellas	674
