= 1948–49 Allsvenskan (men's handball) =

Swedish handball season

Allsvenskan
- 1948–49

Tournament information
- Sport: Handball
- Teams: 10

Final positions
- Champions: IFK Karlskrona

The 1948–49 Allsvenskan was the 15th season of the top division of Swedish handball. 10 teams competed in the league. IFK Karlskrona won the league, but the title of Swedish Champions was awarded to the winner of Svenska mästerskapet. Skövde AIK and IFK Lidingö were relegated.

== League table ==
Pos	Team	Pld	W	D	L	GF	GA	GD	Pts
1	IFK Karlskrona	18	14	1	3	251	176	75	29
2	IFK Kristianstad	18	13	2	3	217	162	55	28
3	Majornas IK	18	10	2	6	227	197	30	22
4	IK Heim	18	9	2	7	166	164	2	20
5	Redbergslids IK	18	8	2	8	186	175	11	18
6	Örebro SK	18	6	3	9	199	226	−27	15
7	F 11 IF	18	6	2	10	231	259	−28	14
8	Västerås IK	18	5	3	10	181	204	−23	13
9	Skövde AIK	18	5	3	10	186	220	−34	13
10	IFK Lidingö	18	3	2	13	172	233	−61	8

== Attendance ==
Team	Attendance
IK Heim	2928
Majornas IK	2818
Redbergslids IK	2817
IFK Kristianstad	1930
Örebro SK	1856
IFK Lidingö	1396
IFK Karlskrona	1279
Skövde AIK	954
Västerås IK	813
F 11 IF	566
