= 1944–45 Svenska mästerskapet (men's handball) =

Swedish handball tournament

Svenska mästerskapet
- 1944–45

Tournament information
- Sport: Handball
- Teams: 16

Final positions
- Champions: Majornas IK (6th title)
- Runner-up: IFK Karlskrona

The 1944–45 Svenska mästerskapet was the 14th season of Svenska mästerskapet, a tournament held to determine the Swedish Champions of men's handball. Teams qualified by winning their respective District Championships. 16 teams competed in the tournament. Majornas IK were the three-time defending champions, and won their sixth title, defeating IFK Karlskrona in the final. The final was played on 15 April in Mässhallen in Gothenburg, and was watched by 3,254 spectators.

== Results ==
=== First round ===
- IK Tord–HK Drott 5–11

=== Second round ===
- Norslunds IF–Gävle GIK 9–16
- Visby IF–SoIK Hellas 13–19
- Skövde AIK–Karlstads BIK w/o
- Lysekils FF–Majornas IK 8–20
- IFK Umeå–IFK Sundsvall 12–8
- Västerås HF–F 11 IF 5–6
- HK Drott–IFK Karlskrona w/o

=== Quarterfinals ===
- Gävle GIK–SoIK Hellas 8–11
- Skövde AIK–Majornas IK 7–10
- IFK Umeå–F 11 IF 12–18
- IFK Malmö–IFK Karlskrona 5–9

=== Semifinals ===
- SoIK Hellas–Majornas IK 8–9
- F 11 IF–IFK Karlskrona 12–15

=== Final ===
- Majornas IK–IFK Karlskrona 12–10

== Champions ==
The following players for Majornas IK received a winner's medal: Bertil Huss, Sven-Eric Forsell, Stig Neptun, Claes Hedenskog, Stig Hjortsberg, Åke Gustafsson, Bertil Herman, Torsten Henriksson, Gunnar Lindgren and Bo Sundby.

== See also ==
1944–45 Allsvenskan (men's handball)
