= 1945–46 Allsvenskan (men's handball) =

Swedish handball season

Allsvenskan
- 1945–46

Tournament information
- Sport: Handball
- Teams: 10

Final positions
- Champions: Redbergslids IK

The 1945–46 Allsvenskan was the 12th season of the top division of Swedish handball. 10 teams competed in the league. Redbergslids IK won the league, but the title of Swedish Champions was awarded to the winner of Svenska mästerskapet. IFK Lidingö and IFK Malmö were relegated.

== League table ==
| Pos | Team | Pld | W | D | L | GF | GA | GD | Pts |
|---|---|---|---|---|---|---|---|---|---|
| 1 | Redbergslids IK | 18 | 12 | 3 | 3 | 217 | 166 | 51 | 27 |
| 2 | Ystads IF | 18 | 10 | 6 | 2 | 162 | 124 | 38 | 26 |
| 3 | Majornas IK | 18 | 11 | 3 | 4 | 212 | 172 | 40 | 25 |
| 4 | SoIK Hellas | 18 | 8 | 2 | 8 | 165 | 179 | −14 | 18 |
| 5 | IFK Karlskrona | 18 | 7 | 3 | 8 | 205 | 181 | 24 | 17 |
| 6 | IK Göta | 18 | 6 | 4 | 8 | 170 | 175 | −5 | 16 |
| 7 | Västerås IK | 18 | 6 | 4 | 8 | 175 | 190 | −15 | 16 |
| 8 | Västerås HF | 18 | 6 | 3 | 9 | 165 | 185 | −20 | 15 |
| 9 | IFK Lidingö | 18 | 5 | 1 | 12 | 146 | 181 | −35 | 11 |
| 10 | IFK Malmö | 18 | 4 | 1 | 13 | 145 | 209 | −64 | 9 |

== Attendance ==
| Team | Attendance |
|---|---|
| Redbergslids IK | 3576 |
| Majornas IK | 3407 |
| SoIK Hellas | 1257 |
| IFK Malmö | 1250 |
| IFK Lidingö | 1097 |
| IK Göta | 1083 |
| IFK Karlskrona | 1036 |
| Ystads IF | 1016 |
| Västerås HF | 957 |
| Västerås IK | 897 |
