= 1940–41 Svenska mästerskapet (men's handball) =

Swedish handball tournament

Svenska mästerskapet
- 1940–41

Tournament information
- Sport: Handball
- Teams: 16

Final positions
- Champions: IFK Kristianstad (1st title)
- Runner-up: IFK Uppsala

The 1940–41 Svenska mästerskapet was the 10th season of Svenska mästerskapet, a tournament held to determine the Swedish Champions of men's handball. Teams qualified by winning their respective District Championships. 16 teams competed in the tournament. Majornas IK were the defending champions, but failed to win the District Championship of Gothenburg and did not qualify. IFK Kristianstad won the title, defeating IFK Uppsala in the final. The final was played on 6 April in Södra kaserns gymnastiksal in Kristianstad, and was watched by 1,299 spectators.

== Results ==
=== First round ===
- Visby AIK–IFK Uppsala w/o
- Sandvikens IF–Nytorps AIK 5–4
- IFK Uddevalla–Redbergslids IK 10–12
- I 2 Karlstad–IFK Skövde result unknown
- Västerås IK–Norrköpings AIS 13–7
- Örebro SK–IK City w/o
- IFK Karlskrona–GoIF Fram w/o
- IS Halmia–IFK Kristianstad 4–24

=== Quarterfinals ===
- IFK Uppsala–Sandvikens IF 8–5
- Redbergslids IK–I 2 Karlstad 18–10
- Västerås IK–Örebro SK 16–5
- IFK Karlskrona–IFK Kristianstad 9–10 a.e.t.

=== Semifinals ===
- IFK Uppsala–Redbergslids IK 7–6
- Västerås IK–IFK Kristianstad 9–12

=== Final ===
- IFK Kristianstad–IFK Uppsala 17–8

== Champions ==
The following players for IFK Kristianstad received a winner's medal: Torsten Strand, Georg Sandberg, Göte Pålsson (1 goal in the final), Eskil Gustafsson, Sven Pålsson (3), Gunnar Jönsson (3), Ernst Cedergren (2), Curt Wadmark (2), Nils Kjellberg (2) and Olle Nilsson (1).

== See also ==
1940–41 Allsvenskan (men's handball)
