= 1946–47 Allsvenskan (men's handball) =

Swedish handball season

Allsvenskan
- 1946–47

Tournament information
- Sport: Handball
- Teams: 10

Final positions
- Champions: Redbergslids IK

The 1946–47 Allsvenskan was the 13th season of the top division of Swedish handball. 10 teams competed in the league. Redbergslids IK won the league, but the title of Swedish Champions was awarded to the winner of Svenska mästerskapet. SoIK Hellas and IK Göta were relegated.

== League table ==
Pos	Team	Pld	W	D	L	GF	GA	GD	Pts
1	Redbergslids IK	18	12	1	5	205	139	66	25
2	IFK Karlskrona	18	11	3	4	197	139	58	25
3	IFK Kristianstad	18	12	0	6	198	185	13	24
4	Majornas IK	18	10	0	8	218	208	10	20
5	Skövde AIK	18	9	0	9	171	167	4	18
6	Västerås IK	18	8	2	8	164	179	−15	18
7	Västerås HF	18	9	0	9	183	205	−22	18
8	Ystads IF	18	6	4	8	162	166	−4	16
9	SoIK Hellas	18	5	2	11	154	180	−26	12
10	IK Göta	18	2	0	16	150	234	−84	4

== Attendance ==
Team	Attendance
Redbergslids IK	3630
Majornas IK	3242
SoIK Hellas	1409
IFK Karlskrona	1241
IFK Kristianstad	1171
IK Göta	1135
Skövde AIK	945
Ystads IF	928
Västerås HF	921
Västerås IK	860
