= 1941–42 Allsvenskan (men's handball) =

Swedish handball season

Allsvenskan
- 1941–42

Tournament information
- Sport: Handball
- Teams: 8

Final positions
- Champions: Majornas IK

The 1941–42 Allsvenskan was the eighth season of the top division of Swedish handball. Eight teams competed in the league. Majornas IK won the league, but the title of Swedish Champions was awarded to the winner of Svenska mästerskapet. IFK Kristianstad and IFK Ystad were relegated.

== League table ==
Pos	Team	Pld	W	D	L	GF	GA	GD	Pts
1	Majornas IK	14	10	1	3	198	110	88	21
2	IFK Karlskrona	14	8	2	4	173	127	46	18
3	Västerås IK	14	8	1	5	138	125	13	17
4	Stockholms-Flottans IF	14	6	3	5	111	121	−10	15
5	Redbergslids IK	14	6	1	7	114	141	−27	13
6	SoIK Hellas	14	5	2	7	104	125	−21	12
7	IFK Kristianstad	14	5	0	9	127	142	−15	10
8	IFK Ystad	14	3	0	11	97	171	−74	6

== Attendance ==
Team	Attendance
Majornas IK	2993
Redbergslids IK	2150
IFK Karlskrona	1303
Stockholms-Flottans IF	1255
Västerås IK	1205
SoIK Hellas	1097
IFK Kristianstad	1014
IFK Ystad	677
