= 1943–44 Allsvenskan (men's handball) =

Swedish handball season

Allsvenskan
- 1943–44

Tournament information
- Sport: Handball
- Teams: 10

Final positions
- Champions: Majornas IK

The 1943–44 Allsvenskan was the tenth season of the top division of Swedish handball. 10 teams competed in the league. Majornas IK won the league, but the title of Swedish Champions was awarded to the winner of Svenska mästerskapet. Sanna IF and Göteborgs BoIS were relegated.

== League table ==
Pos	Team	Pld	W	D	L	GF	GA	GD	Pts
1	Majornas IK	18	13	1	4	236	171	65	27
2	Redbergslids IK	18	11	0	7	176	171	5	22
3	IK Göta	18	9	3	6	170	149	21	21
4	SoIK Hellas	18	10	1	7	158	139	19	21
5	IFK Karlskrona	18	9	1	8	168	162	6	19
6	Ystads IF	18	9	0	9	159	158	1	18
7	Stockholms-Flottans IF	18	6	3	9	149	182	−33	15
8	Västerås HF	18	6	2	10	171	185	−14	14
9	Sanna IF	18	6	1	11	159	200	−41	13
10	Göteborgs BoIS	18	4	2	12	151	180	−29	10

== Attendance ==
Team	Attendance
Majornas IK	2926
Redbergslids IK	2730
Sanna IF	1651
Göteborgs BoIS	1549
Stockholms-Flottans IF	1506
IK Göta	1486
SoIK Hellas	1375
Västerås HF	1145
IFK Karlskrona	933
Ystads IF	894
