= 1944–45 Allsvenskan (men's handball) =

Swedish handball season

Allsvenskan
- 1944–45

Tournament information
- Sport: Handball
- Teams: 10

Final positions
- Champions: IFK Karlskrona

The 1944–45 Allsvenskan was the 11th season of the top division of Swedish handball. 10 teams competed in the league. IFK Karlskrona won the league, but the title of Swedish Champions was awarded to the winner of Svenska mästerskapet. IFK Kristianstad and Stockholms-Flottans IF were relegated.

== League table ==
Pos	Team	Pld	W	D	L	GF	GA	GD	Pts
1	IFK Karlskrona	18	11	3	4	189	153	36	25
2	Majornas IK	18	11	3	4	185	159	26	25
3	SoIK Hellas	18	11	2	5	157	129	28	24
4	IFK Lidingö	18	9	2	7	147	157	−10	20
5	IK Göta	18	8	2	8	177	152	25	18
6	Redbergslids IK	18	8	2	8	177	169	8	18
7	Ystads IF	18	6	5	7	139	156	−17	17
8	Västerås HF	18	7	1	10	195	205	−10	15
9	IFK Kristianstad	18	6	3	9	171	183	−12	15
10	Stockholms-Flottans IF	18	1	1	16	164	238	−74	3

== Attendance ==
Team	Attendance
Majornas IK	3608
Redbergslids IK	2570
IK Göta	1294
IFK Lidingö	1292
IFK Kristianstad	1288
IFK Karlskrona	1172
Stockholms-Flottans IF	1046
SoIK Hellas	1028
Västerås HF	989
Ystads IF	908
