= 1935–36 Svenska mästerskapet (men's handball) =

Swedish handball tournament

Svenska mästerskapet
- 1935–36

Tournament information
- Sport: Handball
- Teams: 19

Final positions
- Champions: SoIK Hellas (1st title)
- Runner-up: Flottans IF Karlskrona

The 1935–36 Svenska mästerskapet was the fifth season of Svenska mästerskapet, a tournament held to determine the Swedish Champions of men's handball. Teams qualified by winning their respective District Championships. Nineteen teams competed in the tournament. Majornas IK were the defending champions, but failed to win the District Championship of Gothenburg and did not qualify. SoIK Hellas won the title, defeating Flottans IF Karlskrona in the final. The final was played on 5 April in Karlskrona, and was watched by 1,288 spectators.

== Results ==
=== First round ===
- Visby AIK–Upsala Studenters IF 6–15
- Gefle IF–SoIK Hellas 7–16
- GUIF–IFK Örebro 15–20
- Norrköpings AIS–Västerås IK 14–16

=== Second round ===
- I 19 Boden–Castor w/o
- Sollefteå GIF–IFK Umeå 11–5
- Upsala Studenters IF–SoIK Hellas 8–9
- IFK Örebro–Västerås IK 10–12
- I 2 Karlstad–Göteborgs IK 13–11
- IFK Karlsborg–IFK Uddevalla 14–10
- Flottans IF Karlskrona–IFK Kristianstad 12–11

=== Third round ===
- I 19 Boden–Sollefteå GIF w/o
- SoIK Hellas–Västerås IK 14–7
- I 2 Karlstad–IFK Karlsborg 5–8
- Flottans IF Karlskrona–GoIF Fram 8–6

=== Semifinals ===
- Sollefteå GIF–SoIK Hellas 4–11
- IFK Karlsborg–Flottans IF Karlskrona 11–18

=== Final ===
- Flottans IF Karlskrona–SoIK Hellas 5–7

== Champions ==
The following players for SoIK Hellas received a winner's medal: Arne Karlsson, Sven Johansson, Sture Johansson, Jan Hellstadius (1 goal in the final), Åke Fröander, Eric Westman (3), Bertil Särneman (3), Arne Leckström and Mats Hellstadius. Mats Hellstadius was later asked to hand over his medal to Bosse Bäckström, who did not play in the final but played in the other matches of the tournament.

== See also ==
1935–36 Allsvenskan (men's handball)
