= 1943–44 Svenska mästerskapet (men's handball) =

Swedish handball tournament

Svenska mästerskapet
- 1943–44

Tournament information
- Sport: Handball
- Teams: 19

Final positions
- Champions: Majornas IK (5th title)
- Runner-up: IFK Karlskrona

The 1943–44 Svenska mästerskapet was the 13th season of Svenska mästerskapet, a tournament held to determine the Swedish Champions of men's handball. Teams qualified by winning their respective District Championships. 19 teams competed in the tournament. Majornas IK were the two-time defending champions, and won their fifth title, defeating IFK Karlskrona in the final. The final was played on 2 April in Karlskrona, and was watched by 1,499 spectators.

== Results ==
=== First round ===
- Visby AIK–AUS, Uppsala 9–13

=== Second round ===
- GIF Sundsvall–Sollefteå GIF 16–8
- Umeå läroverk–Hornskrokens IF 18–12
- AUS, Uppsala–IK Göta 7–13
- Örtakoloniens IF–Ludvika FfI 18–10

=== Third round ===
- GIF Sundsvall–Umeå läroverk 9–4
- IK Göta–Örtakoloniens IF 17–10
- IF Hallby–IF Leikin 16–8
- Västerås HF–IK City 9–3
- Norrköpings AIS–Örebro SK 12–14
- Karlstads BIK–Majornas IK 9–12

=== Quarterfinals ===
- GIF Sundsvall–IK Göta 4–25
- IFK Karlskrona–IF Hallby 11–9 a.e.t.
- Västerås HF–Örebro SK 15–10
- Majornas IK–Uddevalla IS w/o

=== Semifinals ===
- IK Göta–IFK Karlskrona 3–12
- Västerås HF–Majornas IK 8–16

=== Final ===
- IFK Karlskrona–Majornas IK 8–16

== Champions ==
The following players for Majornas IK received a winner's medal: Bertil Huss, Sven-Eric Forsell (1 goal in the final), Claes Hedenskog, Stig Hjortsberg (2), Torsten Henriksson (1), Åke Gustafsson (3), Gustav-Adolf Thorén (5), Lars Lindstrand, Gunnar Lindgren (3) and Bo Sundby(1).

== See also ==
1943–44 Allsvenskan (men's handball)
