= 1945–46 Svenska mästerskapet (men's handball) =

Swedish handball tournament

Svenska mästerskapet
- 1945–46

Tournament information
- Sport: Handball
- Teams: 22

Final positions
- Champions: Majornas IK (7th title)
- Runner-up: Upsala IF

The 1945–46 Svenska mästerskapet was the 15th season of Svenska mästerskapet, a tournament held to determine the Swedish Champions of men's handball. Teams qualified by winning their respective District Championships. 22 teams competed in the tournament. Majornas IK were the four-time defending champions, and won their seventh title, defeating Upsala IF in the final. The final was played on 31 March in Mässhallen in Gothenburg, and was watched by 1,990 spectators.

== Results ==
=== First round ===
- Sollefteå GIF–IFK Östersund 22–13
- Upsala IF–KA 3 Fårösund 17–3
- Sandvikens IF–Västerås HF 9–14
- Skövde AIK–GF Kroppskultur result unknown
- Ludvika FfI–Rynninge IK 12–16
- Motala AIF–IFK Eksjö 15–8

=== Second round ===
- Umeå IK–Bodens BK 12–11
- Sollefteå GIF–GIF Sundsvall 10–12
- GUIF–Upsala IF 9–10 a.e.t.
- IFK Lidingö–Västerås HF 9–10
- GF Kroppskultur–Majornas IK 15–20
- Rynninge IK–Karlstads BIK 14–12
- HK Drott–IFK Kristianstad 16–16
- IFK Karlskrona–Motala AIF 15–4

=== Quarterfinals ===
- Umeå IK–GIF Sundsvall 13–11
- Upsala IF–Västerås HF 10–8
- Majornas IK–Rynninge IK 16–11
- IFK Kristianstad–IFK Karlskrona 16–11

=== Semifinals ===
- Umeå IK–Upsala IF 7–8
- Majornas IK–IFK Kristianstad 17–16

=== Final ===
- Majornas IK–Upsala IF 11–3

== Champions ==
The following players for Majornas IK received a winner's medal: Stig Salomonsson, Sven-Eric Forsell, Stig Neptun, Claes Hedenskog, Lennart Lorentzson (1 goal in the final), Gunnar Lindgren (2), Torsten Henriksson (3), Bengt Wiking (2), Bo Sundby (1) and Stig Nilsson (2).

== See also ==
1945–46 Allsvenskan (men's handball)
