= 1940–41 Allsvenskan (men's handball) =

Swedish handball season

Allsvenskan
- 1940–41

Tournament information
- Sport: Handball
- Teams: 9

Final positions
- Champions: Majornas IK

The 1940–41 Allsvenskan was the seventh season of the top division of Swedish handball. Nine teams competed in the league. Majornas IK won the league, but the title of Swedish Champions was awarded to the winner of Svenska mästerskapet. Göteborgs IK and Ystads IF were relegated.

== League table ==
Pos	Team	Pld	W	D	L	GF	GA	GD	Pts
1	Majornas IK	16	14	1	1	232	150	82	29
2	IFK Kristianstad	16	8	3	5	152	147	5	19
3	Redbergslids IK	16	8	2	6	173	151	22	18
4	IFK Karlskrona	16	8	1	7	163	148	15	17
5	SoIK Hellas	16	7	3	6	125	123	2	17
6	Stockholms-Flottans IF	16	7	2	7	144	148	−4	16
7	Djurgårdens IF	16	6	2	8	115	130	−15	14
8	Göteborgs IK	16	4	0	12	101	159	−58	8
9	Ystads IF	16	2	2	12	101	150	−49	6

== Attendance ==
Team	Attendance
Majornas IK	2476
Redbergslids IK	2004
IFK Kristianstad	1232
IFK Karlskrona	995
SoIK Hellas	962
Stockholms-Flottans IF	863
Djurgårdens IF	790
Göteborgs IK	765
Ystads IF	644
