= 1947–48 Allsvenskan (men's handball) =

Swedish handball season

Allsvenskan
- 1947–48

Tournament information
- Sport: Handball
- Teams: 10

Final positions
- Champions: Redbergslids IK

The 1947–48 Allsvenskan was the 14th season of the top division of Swedish handball. 10 teams competed in the league. Redbergslids IK won the league, but the title of Swedish Champions was awarded to the winner of Svenska mästerskapet. Ystads IF and Västerås HF were relegated.

== League table ==
Pos	Team	Pld	W	D	L	GF	GA	GD	Pts
1	Redbergslids IK	18	13	1	4	183	139	44	27
2	IFK Kristianstad	18	12	1	5	184	146	38	25
3	IFK Karlskrona	18	11	2	5	171	156	15	24
4	IFK Lidingö	18	8	2	8	169	162	7	18
5	Västerås IK	18	8	1	9	175	168	7	17
6	F 11 IF	18	7	3	8	192	202	−10	17
7	Skövde AIK	18	7	2	9	151	175	−24	16
8	Majornas IK	18	7	1	10	173	177	−4	15
9	Ystads IF	18	5	3	10	155	177	−22	13
10	Västerås HF	18	3	2	12	171	222	−51	8

== Attendance ==
Team	Attendance
Redbergslids IK	3830
Majornas IK	3241
IFK Kristianstad	2106
IFK Lidingö	1884
IFK Karlskrona	1249
Skövde AIK	989
Ystads IF	928
Västerås HF	918
Västerås IK	917
F 11 IF	763
