= 1935–36 Allsvenskan (men's handball) =

Swedish handball season

Allsvenskan
- 1935–36

Tournament information
- Sport: Handball
- Teams: 8

Final positions
- Champions: Redbergslids IK

The 1935–36 Allsvenskan was the second season of the top division of Swedish handball. Six teams competed in the league. Redbergslids IK won the league, but the title of Swedish Champions was awarded to the winner of Svenska mästerskapet. IFK Örebro and Karlskrona BK were relegated.

== League table ==
| Pos | Team | Pld | W | D | L | GF | GA | GD | Pts |
|---|---|---|---|---|---|---|---|---|---|
| 1 | Redbergslids IK | 14 | 10 | 2 | 2 | 153 | 100 | 53 | 22 |
| 2 | Stockholms-Flottans IF | 14 | 11 | 0 | 3 | 149 | 113 | 36 | 22 |
| 3 | IK Göta | 14 | 9 | 0 | 5 | 121 | 115 | 6 | 18 |
| 4 | Majornas IK | 14 | 7 | 2 | 5 | 155 | 129 | 26 | 16 |
| 5 | SoIK Hellas | 14 | 5 | 3 | 6 | 130 | 123 | 7 | 13 |
| 6 | Flottans IF Karlskrona | 14 | 5 | 0 | 9 | 128 | 155 | −27 | 10 |
| 7 | IFK Örebro | 14 | 4 | 0 | 10 | 157 | 186 | −29 | 8 |
| 8 | Karlskrona BK | 14 | 1 | 1 | 12 | 126 | 198 | −72 | 3 |

== Attendance ==
| Team | Attendance |
|---|---|
| Redbergslids IK | 846 |
| Majornas IK | 832 |
| Karlskrona BK | 775 |
| Flottans IF Karlskrona | 765 |
| IFK Örebro | 609 |
| Stockholms-Flottans IF | 524 |
| IK Göta | 378 |
| SoIK Hellas | 376 |
