= 1937–38 Allsvenskan (men's handball) =

Swedish handball season

Allsvenskan
- 1937–38

Tournament information
- Sport: Handball
- Teams: 8

Final positions
- Champions: Majornas IK

The 1937–38 Allsvenskan was the fourth season of the top division of Swedish handball. Eight teams competed in the league. Majornas IK won the league, but the title of Swedish Champions was awarded to the winner of Svenska mästerskapet. Sanna IF and Göteborgs IK were relegated.

== League table ==
Pos	Team	Pld	W	D	L	GF	GA	GD	Pts
1	Majornas IK	14	11	1	2	197	131	66	23
2	Redbergslids IK	14	10	2	2	170	102	68	22
3	Flottans IF Karlskrona	14	10	2	2	126	108	18	22
4	SoIK Hellas	14	5	4	5	146	130	16	14
5	Upsala Studenters IF	14	5	0	9	117	156	−39	10
6	Stockholms-Flottans IF	14	3	3	8	97	124	−27	9
7	Sanna IF	14	3	1	10	114	151	−37	7
8	Göteborgs IK	14	2	1	11	105	170	−65	5

== Attendance ==
Team	Attendance
Flottans IF Karlskrona	1198
Redbergslids IK	899
Majornas IK	753
Upsala Studenters IF	743
SoIK Hellas	539
Sanna IF	422
Stockholms-Flottans IF	339
Göteborgs IK	208
