= 1942–43 Svenska mästerskapet (men's handball) =

Swedish handball tournament

Svenska mästerskapet
- 1942–43

Tournament information
- Sport: Handball
- Teams: 19

Final positions
- Champions: Majornas IK (4th title)
- Runner-up: Västerås HF

The 1942–43 Svenska mästerskapet was the 12th season of the tournament held to determine the Swedish men's handball champions. Teams qualified by winning their respective District Championships. A total of 19 teams participated in the competition.

Majornas IK, the defending champions, claimed their fourth title by defeating Västerås HF in the final. The match was held on 18 April at the Mässhallen in Gothenburg, and was attended by approximately 1,900 spectators.

== Results ==
=== First round ===
- Bodens BK–Umeå IK result unknown
- Västerås HF–GUIF 10–6
- Motala AIF–IFK Örebro 13–12 a.e.t.
- Norslunds IF–Sandvikens IF 5–22

=== Second round ===
- Umeå IK–Sollefteå GIF 13–15
- Västerås HF–Motala AIF 17–9
- IF Leikin–Ystads IF HF w/o
- IF Hallby–IFK Karlskrona w/o
- Visby AIK–IFK Lidingö 6–13
- Upsala IF–Sandvikens IF 15–5
- GF Kroppskultur–Majornas IK 12–29

=== Quarterfinals ===
- Sollefteå GIF–Västerås HF 8–11
- Ystads IF HF–IFK Karlskrona 13–6
- IFK Lidingö–Upsala IF 12–8 a.e.t.
- IFK Skövde–Majornas IK 10–27

=== Semifinals ===
- Västerås HF–Ystads IF HF 9–8
- IFK Lidingö–Majornas IK 7–14

=== Final ===
- Majornas IK–Västerås HF 14–8

== Champions ==
The following players from Majornas IK received winner's medals: Bertil Huss, Stig Neptun (1 goal in the final), Claes Hedenskog (2), Sven-Eric Forsell (1), Stig Hjortsberg (3), Åke Gustafsson (2), Gustav-Adolf Thorén (1), Gunnar Lindgren (2), Torsten Henriksson (2), and Bo Sundby.

== See also ==
1941–42 Allsvenskan (men's handball)
