= Pierre Thorsson =

Swedish handball player (born 1966)

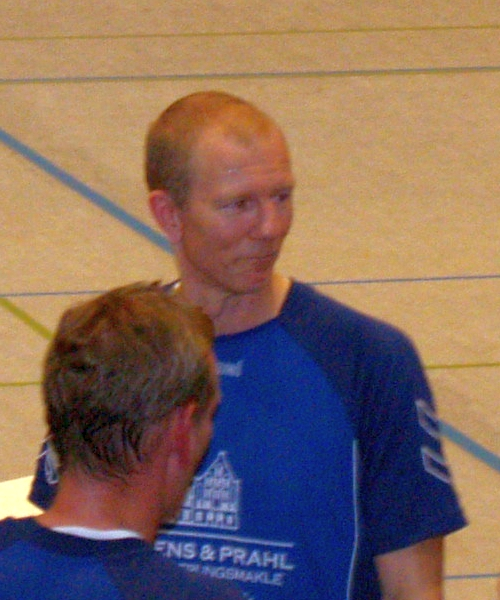
- Thorsson in 2011

Personal information
- Full name: Pierre Roger Valdemar Thorsson
- Nationality: Swedish
- Born: 21 June 1966 (age 60) Linköping, Sweden
- Height: 1.89 m (6 ft 2 in)

Sport
- Sport: Handball
- Position: Right wing / right back
- Current club: Retired

Youth career
- Years: Team
- –: Risbrinkspojkarna

Senior clubs
- Years: Team
- 1986-1989: IFK Karlskrona
- 1989-1996: IF Saab/HF Linköpings Lejon
- 1996-2001: VfL Bad Schwartau
- 2001-2003: Pallamano Conversano
- 2003-2004: SG Flensburg-Handewitt
- 2004-2005: Hästö IF
National team
Years	Team	Apps	(Gls)
1988-2000	Sweden	237	(557)

Teams managed
- 2004-2008: Hästö IF
- 2009-2012: Hästö IF (junior)
- 2012-2017: Kungliga Flottans IF women's team
- 2017: HIF Karlskrona assistant
Medal record
Olympic Games
Silver medal – second place	1992 Barcelona	Team
Silver medal – second place	1996 Atlanta	Team
Silver medal – second place	2000 Sydney	Team
European Championship
Gold medal – first place	1994 Portugal
Gold medal – first place	1998 Italy
Gold medal – first place	2000 Croatia
World Championship
Gold medal – first place	1990 Czechoslovakia
Gold medal – first place	1999 Egypt
Bronze medal – third place	1993 Sweden
Bronze medal – third place	1995 Iceland
Silver medal – second place	1997 Japan

Pierre Roger Valdemar Thorsson (born 21 June 1966) is a Swedish handball player and coach. He was a part of the first generation of the 'Bengan boys', the Swedish golden generation that won both the World Championship and European Championship.

== Career ==
In his homecountry Thorsson started in career at IFK Karlskrona and later joined IF Saab-HF Linköpings Lejon. In 1996 he joined German 2. Bundesliga side VfL Bad Schwartau, where he was promoted to the German Bundesliga in 1998 and won the 2001 DHB-Pokal.

In 2001 he joined the Italian club Papillon Coversano, where he won the Italian championship twice.

In 2003 he returned to the German Bundesliga to SG Flensburg-Handewitt, where he played for one season. He won the Bundesliga with the club, before returning to Sweden to join Hästö IF in the Swedish Division 1 as player-assistant coach.

=== National team ===
Thorsson won the 1990 and the 1990 World Championships with Sweden. He also competed in the 1992 Summer Olympics, in the 1996 Summer Olympics and in the 2000 Summer Olympics where Sweden won silver each time.

In 1992 he was a member of the Swedish handball team won the silver medal in the Olympic tournament. He played six matches and scored 25 goals.

Four years later he was part of the Swedish team which won the silver medal again. He played six matches and scored 30 goals.

At the 2000 Games he won his third silver medal with the Swedish team. He played five matches and scored 13 goals.

== Coaching career ==
After he retired he bacme the head coach of Hästö IF until 2008. In 2009 he changed job to be a youth coach at the club.

In August 2012 he took over as the head coach of the Flottans IF women's team. Here he was until 2017, when he became the assistant coach at HIF Karlskrona.
