= Bengt Johansson (handball) =

Swedish handball player and coach (1942–2022)

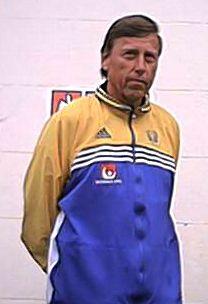
- Johansson in 2002

Personal information
- Nationality: Sweden
- Born: 25 June 1942 Halmstad, Sweden
- Died: 8 May 2022 (aged 79) Halmstad, Sweden
- Height: 1.94 m (6 ft 4 in)

Sport
- Sport: Handball
- Position: Pivot

Youth career
- Years: Team
- –: Halmstad HP

Senior clubs
- Years: Team
- 1961–1966: Halmstad HP
- 1966–1970: SoIK Hellas
- 1970–1971: Halmstad HP
- 1971–1976: HK Drott
National team
Years	Team	Apps	(Gls)
1963–1973	Sweden	83	(52)

Teams managed
- –: IK Hele
- –: IK Silwing
- 1974–1975: HK Drott (player-coach)
- 1976–1984: HK Drott
- 1985–1988: HK Drott
- 1988–2004: Sweden
Medal record
Head Coach for Sweden
Olympic Games
Silver medal – second place	1992 Barcelona	Coach
Silver medal – second place	1996 Atlanta	Coach
Silver medal – second place	2000 Sydney	Coach
World Championship
Gold medal – first place	1990 Czechoslovakia
Gold medal – first place	1999 Egypt
Silver medal – second place	1997 Japan
Silver medal – second place	2001 France
Bronze medal – third place	1993 Sweden
Bronze medal – third place	1995 Iceland
European Championship
Gold medal – first place	1994 Portugal
Gold medal – first place	1998 Italy
Gold medal – first place	2000 Croatia
Gold medal – first place	2002 Sweden

Bengt Johansson (25 June 1942 – 8 May 2022) was a Swedish handball player and coach. He is one of the most decorated national team coaches in handball history and won thirteen international medals with the Swedish men's national handball team during a sixteen-year reign, including two World Championship gold medals (1990, 1999), four European Championship gold medals (1994, 1998, 2000, 2002) and three Olympic Games silver medals (1992, 1996, 2000).

Born in Halmstad in south-west Sweden, Johansson began his playing career for local team Halmstad HP and spent his career as a player in Sweden, where he won championship titles with SoIK Hellas and HK Drott. He was capped 83 times and scored 52 goals for the Swedish national team from 1963 to 1973. Johansson moved into coaching as a player-coach for HK Drott in 1974 and won five championship titles with the team across twelve seasons. He became the head coach of the Sweden men's national handball team in 1988. During his time as head coach, the national team was nicknamed the Bengan Boys after his own nickname. Johansson is also the inventor of the tactical move known as Gurkburken ("The Gherkin Jar"). He was succeeded as national coach by Ingemar Linnéll.

Johansson died on 8 May 2022, at the age of 79. He suffered from Parkinson's disease during the final years of his life.

== Honours ==
=== Player ===
SoIK Hellas

- Swedish Championship: 1969, 1970

HK Drott

- Swedish Championship: 1975

=== Manager ===
HK Drott

- Swedish Championship: 1975, 1978, 1979, 1984, 1988

Sweden

- Olympic Games:
  - Silver: 1992, 1996, 2000
- World Men's Handball Championship:
  - Gold: 1990, 1999
  - Silver: 1997, 2001
  - Bronze: 1993, 1995
- European Men's Handball Championship:
  - Gold: 1994, 1998, 2000, 2002
