= 1999 World Men's Handball Championship =

Tournament details
- Host country: Egypt
- Venues: 4 (in 3 host cities)
- Dates: 1–15 June
- Teams: 24

Final positions
- Champions: Sweden (4th title)
- Runners-up: Russia
- Third place: FR Yugoslavia
- Fourth place: Spain

Tournament statistics
- Matches played: 80
- Goals scored: 4,044 (50.55 per match)
- Top scorers: Rolando Uríos (CUB) (57 goals)

Awards
- Best player: Stefan Lövgren (SWE)

The 1999 World Men's Handball Championship was the 16th edition of the World Championship in team handball. It was held in Egypt, from 1 to 15 June, in the cities of Cairo, Ismailia and Port Said. Sweden won the championship.

== Qualification ==
Competition	Dates	Vacancies	Qualified
Host nation		1	Egypt
1997 World Championship	16 May–1 June 1997	1	Russia
1998 European Championship	29 May – 7 June 1998	4	Sweden; Spain; Germany; FR Yugoslavia
1998 Pan American Championship	22–29 September 1998	3	Cuba; Argentina; Brazil
1998 African Championship	19–28 October 1998	4	Tunisia; Algeria; Nigeria; Morocco
European qualification	24 June – 29 November 1998	6	Croatia; Denmark; France; Hungary; North Macedonia; Norway
Asian qualification		4	China; Kuwait; Saudi Arabia; South Korea
Oceanian qualification		1	Australia

== Preliminary round ==
All times are local (UTC+3).

=== Group A ===
Pos	Team	Pld	W	D	L	GF	GA	GD	Pts	Qualification
1	Spain	5	5	0	0	163	101	+62	10	Round of 16
2	Denmark	5	4	0	1	117	108	+9	8	Round of 16
3	Tunisia	5	2	1	2	111	118	−7	5	Round of 16
4	Algeria	5	1	1	3	106	120	−14	3 (Note: Algeria 19–19 Morocco)	Round of 16
5	Morocco	5	0	3	2	100	117	−17	3	
6	Argentina	5	0	1	4	96	129	−33	1	

Notes:

2 June 1999; 17:30	Tunisia	23–19	Argentina	Cairo; Attendance: 1,000; Referees: Pendić, Majstorović (FRY)
2 June 1999; 17:30		(9–8)		Cairo; Attendance: 1,000; Referees: Pendić, Majstorović (FRY)

2 June 1999; 19:30	Denmark	20–19	Morocco	Cairo; Attendance: 2,000; Referees: Al-Holi, Al-Enezi (KUW)
2 June 1999; 19:30		(11–7)		Cairo; Attendance: 2,000; Referees: Al-Holi, Al-Enezi (KUW)

2 June 1999; 21:30	Spain	34–24	Algeria	Cairo; Attendance: 2,000; Referees: Øie, Høgsnes (NOR)
2 June 1999; 21:30		(20–11)		Cairo; Attendance: 2,000; Referees: Øie, Høgsnes (NOR)

3 June 1999; 17:30	Morocco	23–23	Tunisia	Cairo; Attendance: 200; Referees: Anusic, Bojsen (USA)
3 June 1999; 17:30		(8–12)		Cairo; Attendance: 200; Referees: Anusic, Bojsen (USA)

3 June 1999; 19:30	Argentina	19–31	Spain	Cairo; Attendance: 2,000; Referees: Klucsó, Lekrinszki (HUN)
3 June 1999; 19:30		(6–15)		Cairo; Attendance: 2,000; Referees: Klucsó, Lekrinszki (HUN)

3 June 1999; 21:30	Algeria	18–28	Denmark	Cairo; Attendance: 2,000; Referees: Pendić, Majstorović (FRY)
3 June 1999; 21:30		(9–12)		Cairo; Attendance: 2,000; Referees: Pendić, Majstorović (FRY)

4 June 1999; 17:30	Spain	34–18	Morocco	Cairo; Attendance: 2,500; Referees: Al-Holi, Al-Enezi (KUW)
4 June 1999; 17:30		(16–9)		Cairo; Attendance: 2,500; Referees: Al-Holi, Al-Enezi (KUW)

4 June 1999; 19:30	Argentina	16–25	Algeria	Cairo; Attendance: 2,500; Referees: Hansson, Olsson (SWE)
4 June 1999; 19:30		(9–11)		Cairo; Attendance: 2,500; Referees: Hansson, Olsson (SWE)

4 June 1999; 21:30	Tunisia	19–23	Denmark	Cairo; Attendance: 2,500; Referees: Klucsó, Lekrinszki (HUN)
4 June 1999; 21:30		(8–11)		Cairo; Attendance: 2,500; Referees: Klucsó, Lekrinszki (HUN)

6 June 1999; 17:30	Tunisia	23–20	Algeria	Cairo; Attendance: 3,000; Referees: Garcia, Moreno (FRA)
6 June 1999; 17:30		(12–10)		Cairo; Attendance: 3,000; Referees: Garcia, Moreno (FRA)

6 June 1999; 19:30	Morocco	21–21	Argentina	Cairo; Attendance: 3,000; Referees: Litvinov, Khudoerko (RUS)
6 June 1999; 19:30		(10–12)		Cairo; Attendance: 3,000; Referees: Litvinov, Khudoerko (RUS)

6 June 1999; 21:30	Denmark	17–31	Spain	Cairo; Attendance: 3,500; Referees: Klucsó, Lekrinszki (HUN)
6 June 1999; 21:30		(8–16)		Cairo; Attendance: 3,500; Referees: Klucsó, Lekrinszki (HUN)

7 June 1999; 17:30	Algeria	19–19	Morocco	Cairo; Attendance: 2,000; Referees: Øie, Høgsnes (NOR)
7 June 1999; 17:30		(11–10)		Cairo; Attendance: 2,000; Referees: Øie, Høgsnes (NOR)

7 June 1999; 19:30	Denmark	29–21	Argentina	Cairo; Attendance: 2,500; Referees: Litvinov, Khudoerko (RUS)
7 June 1999; 19:30		(12–9)		Cairo; Attendance: 2,500; Referees: Litvinov, Khudoerko (RUS)

7 June 1999; 21:30	Spain	33–23	Tunisia	Cairo; Attendance: 2,500; Referees: Hansson, Olsson (SWE)
7 June 1999; 21:30		(16–13)		Cairo; Attendance: 2,500; Referees: Hansson, Olsson (SWE)

=== Group B ===
Pos	Team	Pld	W	D	L	GF	GA	GD	Pts	Qualification
1	Germany	5	5	0	0	146	100	+46	10	Round of 16
2	Egypt (H)	5	4	0	1	126	111	+15	8	Round of 16
3	Cuba	5	3	0	2	153	131	+22	6	Round of 16
4	Brazil	5	2	0	3	108	133	−25	4	Round of 16
5	North Macedonia	5	1	0	4	122	149	−27	2	
6	Saudi Arabia	5	0	0	5	101	132	−31	0	

Source: IHF
(H) Hosts

1 June 1999; 21:30	Egypt	28–19	Brazil	Cairo Stadium – Hall 1, Cairo; Attendance: 22,000; Referees: Garcia, Moreno (FRA)
1 June 1999; 21:30		(16–8)		Cairo Stadium – Hall 1, Cairo; Attendance: 22,000; Referees: Garcia, Moreno (FRA)

2 June 1999; 19:30	Saudi Arabia	21–28	North Macedonia	Cairo Stadium – Hall 1, Cairo; Attendance: 3,500; Referees: Anusic, Bojsen (USA)
2 June 1999; 19:30		(11–16)		Cairo Stadium – Hall 1, Cairo; Attendance: 3,500; Referees: Anusic, Bojsen (USA)

2 June 1999; 21:30	Germany	34–25	Cuba	Cairo Stadium – Hall 1, Cairo; Attendance: 3,500; Referees: Garcia, Moreno (FRA)
2 June 1999; 21:30		(15–13)		Cairo Stadium – Hall 1, Cairo; Attendance: 3,500; Referees: Garcia, Moreno (FRA)

3 June 1999; 17:15	Brazil	22–21	Saudi Arabia	Cairo Stadium – Hall 1, Cairo; Attendance: 7,000; Referees: Al-Holi, Al-Enezi (KUW)
3 June 1999; 17:15		(14–12)		Cairo Stadium – Hall 1, Cairo; Attendance: 7,000; Referees: Al-Holi, Al-Enezi (KUW)

3 June 1999; 19:15	North Macedonia	25–36	Germany	Cairo Stadium – Hall 1, Cairo; Attendance: 10,000; Referees: Litvinov, Khudoerko (RUS)
3 June 1999; 19:15		(9–16)		Cairo Stadium – Hall 1, Cairo; Attendance: 10,000; Referees: Litvinov, Khudoerko (RUS)

3 June 1999; 21:15	Cuba	29–31	Egypt	Cairo Stadium – Hall 1, Cairo; Attendance: 20,000; Referees: Hansson, Olsson (SWE)
3 June 1999; 21:15		(14–17)		Cairo Stadium – Hall 1, Cairo; Attendance: 20,000; Referees: Hansson, Olsson (SWE)

4 June 1999; 17:15	Germany	26–13	Brazil	Cairo Stadium – Hall 1, Cairo; Attendance: 4,000; Referees: Pendić, Majstorović (FRY)
4 June 1999; 17:15		(15–7)		Cairo Stadium – Hall 1, Cairo; Attendance: 4,000; Referees: Pendić, Majstorović (FRY)

4 June 1999; 19:15	North Macedonia	18–32	Cuba	Cairo Stadium – Hall 1, Cairo; Attendance: 10,000; Referees: Øie, Høgsnes (NOR)
4 June 1999; 19:15		(10–16)		Cairo Stadium – Hall 1, Cairo; Attendance: 10,000; Referees: Øie, Høgsnes (NOR)

4 June 1999; 21:15	Saudi Arabia	16–19	Egypt	Cairo Stadium – Hall 1, Cairo; Attendance: 18,000; Referees: Litvinov, Khudoerko (RUS)
4 June 1999; 21:15		(4–10)		Cairo Stadium – Hall 1, Cairo; Attendance: 18,000; Referees: Litvinov, Khudoerko (RUS)

6 June 1999; 17:30	Saudi Arabia	24–36	Cuba	Cairo Stadium – Hall 1, Cairo; Attendance: 10,000; Referees: Pendić, Majstorović (FRY)
6 June 1999; 17:30		(10–17)		Cairo Stadium – Hall 1, Cairo; Attendance: 10,000; Referees: Pendić, Majstorović (FRY)

6 June 1999; 19:30	Brazil	30–27	North Macedonia	Cairo Stadium – Hall 1, Cairo; Attendance: 23,000; Referees: Hansson, Olsson (SWE)
6 June 1999; 19:30		(15–15)		Cairo Stadium – Hall 1, Cairo; Attendance: 23,000; Referees: Hansson, Olsson (SWE)

6 June 1999; 21:30	Egypt	18–23	Germany	Cairo Stadium – Hall 1, Cairo; Attendance: 25,000; Referees: Øie, Høgsnes (NOR)
6 June 1999; 21:30		(7–9)		Cairo Stadium – Hall 1, Cairo; Attendance: 25,000; Referees: Øie, Høgsnes (NOR)

7 June 1999; 17:30	Cuba	31–24	Brazil	Cairo Stadium – Hall 1, Cairo; Attendance: 5,000; Referees: Anusic, Bojsen (USA)
7 June 1999; 17:30		(15–10)		Cairo Stadium – Hall 1, Cairo; Attendance: 5,000; Referees: Anusic, Bojsen (USA)

7 June 1999; 19:30	Germany	27–19	Saudi Arabia	Cairo Stadium – Hall 1, Cairo; Attendance: 15,000; Referees: Klucsó, Lekrinszki (HUN)
7 June 1999; 19:30		(13–10)		Cairo Stadium – Hall 1, Cairo; Attendance: 15,000; Referees: Klucsó, Lekrinszki (HUN)

7 June 1999; 21:30	Egypt	30–24	North Macedonia	Cairo Stadium – Hall 1, Cairo; Attendance: 21,000; Referees: Garcia, Moreno (FRA)
7 June 1999; 21:30		(18–8)		Cairo Stadium – Hall 1, Cairo; Attendance: 21,000; Referees: Garcia, Moreno (FRA)

=== Group C ===
Pos	Team	Pld	W	D	L	GF	GA	GD	Pts	Qualification
1	Russia	5	5	0	0	162	106	+56	10	Round of 16
2	Croatia	5	3	1	1	118	115	+3	7	Round of 16
3	Hungary	5	3	0	2	134	112	+22	6	Round of 16
4	Norway	5	2	1	2	130	129	+1	5	Round of 16
5	Kuwait	5	1	0	4	107	147	−40	2	
6	Nigeria	5	0	0	5	112	154	−42	0	

2 June 1999; 16:00	Croatia	25–19	Kuwait	Ismailia; Attendance: 2,000; Referees: Selem, Ali (EGY)
2 June 1999; 16:00		(15–7)		Ismailia; Attendance: 2,000; Referees: Selem, Ali (EGY)

2 June 1999; 18:00	Hungary	34–25	Nigeria	Ismailia; Attendance: 2,000; Referees: Migas, Bavas (GRE)
2 June 1999; 18:00		(16–9)		Ismailia; Attendance: 2,000; Referees: Migas, Bavas (GRE)

2 June 1999; 20:00	Russia	35–27	Norway	Ismailia; Attendance: 2,000; Referees: Bülow, Lübker (GER)
2 June 1999; 20:00		(19–11)		Ismailia; Attendance: 2,000; Referees: Bülow, Lübker (GER)

3 June 1999; 16:00	Kuwait	16–32	Hungary	Ismailia; Attendance: 2,000; Referees: Gallego, Lamas (ESP)
3 June 1999; 16:00		(8–15)		Ismailia; Attendance: 2,000; Referees: Gallego, Lamas (ESP)

3 June 1999; 18:00	Nigeria	23–36	Russia	Ismailia; Attendance: 2,100; Referees: Selem, Ali (EGY)
3 June 1999; 18:00		(11–17)		Ismailia; Attendance: 2,100; Referees: Selem, Ali (EGY)

3 June 1999; 20:00	Norway	23–23	Croatia	Ismailia; Attendance: 2,500; Referees: Migas, Bavas (GRE)
3 June 1999; 20:00		(13–11)		Ismailia; Attendance: 2,500; Referees: Migas, Bavas (GRE)

4 June 1999; 16:00	Russia	35–15	Kuwait	Ismailia; Attendance: 1,800; Referees: Migas, Bavas (GRE)
4 June 1999; 16:00		(20–6)		Ismailia; Attendance: 1,800; Referees: Migas, Bavas (GRE)

4 June 1999; 18:00	Hungary	19–20	Croatia	Ismailia; Attendance: 2,400; Referees: Bülow, Lübker (GER)
4 June 1999; 18:00		(8–10)		Ismailia; Attendance: 2,400; Referees: Bülow, Lübker (GER)

4 June 1999; 20:00	Nigeria	13–27	Norway	Ismailia; Attendance: 2,500; Referees: Gallego, Lamas (ESP)
4 June 1999; 20:00		(9–8)		Ismailia; Attendance: 2,500; Referees: Gallego, Lamas (ESP)

6 June 1999; 15:30	Croatia	23–29	Russia	Ismailia; Attendance: 2,400; Referees: Gallego, Lamas (ESP)
6 June 1999; 15:30		(7–13)		Ismailia; Attendance: 2,400; Referees: Gallego, Lamas (ESP)

6 June 1999; 17:30	Kuwait	30–26	Nigeria	Ismailia; Attendance: 2,500; Referees: Boye, Jensen (DEN)
6 June 1999; 17:30		(14–17)		Ismailia; Attendance: 2,500; Referees: Boye, Jensen (DEN)

6 June 1999; 19:30	Hungary	31–24	Norway	Ismailia; Attendance: 2,600; Referees: Fegir, Stegura (UKR)
6 June 1999; 19:30		(13–13)		Ismailia; Attendance: 2,600; Referees: Fegir, Stegura (UKR)

7 June 1999; 16:00	Croatia	27–25	Nigeria	Ismailia; Attendance: 2,200; Referees: Fegir, Stegura (UKR)
7 June 1999; 16:00		(14–10)		Ismailia; Attendance: 2,200; Referees: Fegir, Stegura (UKR)

7 June 1999; 18:00	Russia	27–18	Hungary	Ismailia; Attendance: 2,100; Referees: Boye, Jensen (DEN)
7 June 1999; 18:00		(12–10)		Ismailia; Attendance: 2,100; Referees: Boye, Jensen (DEN)

7 June 1999; 20:00	Norway	29–27	Kuwait	Ismailia; Attendance: 2,400; Referees: Gallego, Lamas (ESP)
7 June 1999; 20:00		(18–14)		Ismailia; Attendance: 2,400; Referees: Gallego, Lamas (ESP)

=== Group D ===
Pos	Team	Pld	W	D	L	GF	GA	GD	Pts	Qualification
1	Sweden	5	4	1	0	168	104	+64	9	Round of 16
2	France	5	4	0	1	151	113	+38	8	Round of 16
3	FR Yugoslavia	5	3	1	1	156	120	+36	7	Round of 16
4	South Korea	5	2	0	3	146	122	+24	4	Round of 16
5	China	5	1	0	4	122	193	−71	2	
6	Australia	5	0	0	5	101	192	−91	0	

2 June 1999; 15:30	FR Yugoslavia	43–25	China	Port Said Hall, Port Said; Attendance: 2,800; Referees: Kohout, Dolejš (CZE)
2 June 1999; 15:30		(23–12)		Port Said Hall, Port Said; Attendance: 2,800; Referees: Kohout, Dolejš (CZE)

2 June 1999; 17:30	Sweden	25–20	South Korea	Port Said Hall, Port Said; Attendance: 2,000; Referees: Merghany, Towfik (EGY)
2 June 1999; 17:30		(14–13)		Port Said Hall, Port Said; Attendance: 2,000; Referees: Merghany, Towfik (EGY)

2 June 1999; 20:00	France	32–15	Australia	Port Said Hall, Port Said; Attendance: 2,000; Referees: Boye, Jensen (DEN)
2 June 1999; 20:00		(16–9)		Port Said Hall, Port Said; Attendance: 2,000; Referees: Boye, Jensen (DEN)

3 June 1999; 15:30	China	21–42	Sweden	Port Said Hall, Port Said; Attendance: 1,500; Referees: Fegir, Stegura (UKR)
3 June 1999; 15:30		(11–23)		Port Said Hall, Port Said; Attendance: 1,500; Referees: Fegir, Stegura (UKR)

3 June 1999; 17:30	Australia	22–40	FR Yugoslavia	Port Said Hall, Port Said; Attendance: 1,500; Referees: Merghany, Towfik (EGY)
3 June 1999; 17:30		(11–24)		Port Said Hall, Port Said; Attendance: 1,500; Referees: Merghany, Towfik (EGY)

3 June 1999; 20:00	South Korea	25–28	France	Port Said Hall, Port Said; Attendance: 2,000; Referees: Kohout, Dolejš (CZE)
3 June 1999; 20:00		(12–13)		Port Said Hall, Port Said; Attendance: 2,000; Referees: Kohout, Dolejš (CZE)

4 June 1999; 15:30	Sweden	49–17	Australia	Port Said Hall, Port Said; Attendance: 1,500; Referees: Kohout, Dolejš (CZE)
4 June 1999; 15:30		(22–10)		Port Said Hall, Port Said; Attendance: 1,500; Referees: Kohout, Dolejš (CZE)

4 June 1999; 17:30	China	23–38	South Korea	Port Said Hall, Port Said; Attendance: 2,000; Referees: Merghany, Towfik (EGY)
4 June 1999; 17:30		(12–18)		Port Said Hall, Port Said; Attendance: 2,000; Referees: Merghany, Towfik (EGY)

4 June 1999; 20:00	FR Yugoslavia	23–26	France	Port Said Hall, Port Said; Attendance: 2,500; Referees: Boye, Jensen (DEN)
4 June 1999; 20:00		(11–13)		Port Said Hall, Port Said; Attendance: 2,500; Referees: Boye, Jensen (DEN)

6 June 1999; 15:30	FR Yugoslavia	28–25	South Korea	Port Said Hall, Port Said; Attendance: 2,000; Referees: Migas, Bavas (GRE)
6 June 1999; 15:30		(10–13)		Port Said Hall, Port Said; Attendance: 2,000; Referees: Migas, Bavas (GRE)

6 June 1999; 17:30	France	24–30	Sweden	Port Said Hall, Port Said; Attendance: 2,500; Referees: Bülow, Lübker (GER)
6 June 1999; 17:30		(13–13)		Port Said Hall, Port Said; Attendance: 2,500; Referees: Bülow, Lübker (GER)

6 June 1999; 19:30	Australia	29–33	China	Port Said Hall, Port Said; Attendance: 2,500; Referees: Merghany, Towfik (EGY)
6 June 1999; 19:30		(16–15)		Port Said Hall, Port Said; Attendance: 2,500; Referees: Merghany, Towfik (EGY)

7 June 1999; 16:00	Sweden	22–22	FR Yugoslavia	Port Said Hall, Port Said; Attendance: 2,000; Referees: Kohout, Dolejš (CZE)
7 June 1999; 16:00		(11–15)		Port Said Hall, Port Said; Attendance: 2,000; Referees: Kohout, Dolejš (CZE)

7 June 1999; 18:00	South Korea	38–18	Australia	Port Said Hall, Port Said; Attendance: 2,500; Referees: Bülow, Lübker (GER)
7 June 1999; 18:00		(19–9)		Port Said Hall, Port Said; Attendance: 2,500; Referees: Bülow, Lübker (GER)

7 June 1999; 20:00	France	41–20	China	Port Said Hall, Port Said; Attendance: 1,000; Referees: Merghany, Towfik (EGY)
7 June 1999; 20:00		(18–7)		Port Said Hall, Port Said; Attendance: 1,000; Referees: Merghany, Towfik (EGY)

== Final round ==
=== Bracket ===
Round of 16
9 June
Spain	27
Brazil	17
9 June
Hungary	23
France	24
9 June
Russia	31
South Korea	23
9 June
Tunisia	22
Egypt	24
9 June
FR Yugoslavia	30
Croatia	23
9 June
Germany	28
Algeria	17
9 June
Cuba	32
Denmark	24
9 June
Sweden	33
Norway	26

Quarterfinals
11 June
Spain	23
France	18
11 June
Russia	26
Egypt	20
11 June
FR Yugoslavia	22
Germany	21
11 June
Cuba	26
Sweden	33

Semifinals
13 June
Spain	21
Russia	22
13 June
FR Yugoslavia	22
Sweden	23

Final
15 June
Russia	24
Sweden	25
Third place
15 June
Spain	24
FR Yugoslavia	27

Fifth place bracket

5–8th place semifinals
13 June
Egypt	25
France (ET)	27
13 June
Cuba	22
Germany	23

Fifth place
14 June
France	21
Germany	26
Seventh place
14 June
Egypt	35
Cuba	28

=== Round of 16 ===
9 June 1999; 15:00	Cuba	32–24	Denmark	Cairo Stadium – Hall 1, Cairo; Attendance: 2,000; Referees: Klucso, Lekrinszki (HUN)
9 June 1999; 15:00		(13–14)		Cairo Stadium – Hall 1, Cairo; Attendance: 2,000; Referees: Klucso, Lekrinszki (HUN)

9 June 1999; 16:15	Germany	28–17	Algeria	Cairo Stadium – Hall 1, Cairo; Attendance: 10,000; Referees: Hansson, Olsson (SWE)
9 June 1999; 16:15		(14–9)		Cairo Stadium – Hall 1, Cairo; Attendance: 10,000; Referees: Hansson, Olsson (SWE)

9 June 1999; 18:00	Russia	31–23	South Korea	Mubarak Hall, Ismailia; Attendance: 2,000; Referees: Pendić, Majstorović (SCG)
9 June 1999; 18:00		(16–8)		Mubarak Hall, Ismailia; Attendance: 2,000; Referees: Pendić, Majstorović (SCG)

9 June 1999; 18:00	Hungary	23–24	France	Port Said Hall, Port Said; Attendance: 2,500; Referees: Kohout, Dolejš (CZE)
9 June 1999; 18:00		(11–14)		Port Said Hall, Port Said; Attendance: 2,500; Referees: Kohout, Dolejš (CZE)

9 June 1999; 19:30	Spain	27–17	Brazil	Cairo Stadium – Hall 1, Cairo; Attendance: 18,000; Referees: Litvinov, Khudoerko (RUS)
9 June 1999; 19:30	Olalla, Urdangarin 5	(15–5)	Bruno Souza 6	Cairo Stadium – Hall 1, Cairo; Attendance: 18,000; Referees: Litvinov, Khudoerko (RUS)
9 June 1999; 19:30	3× (suspension)	Marca	1× (suspension)	Cairo Stadium – Hall 1, Cairo; Attendance: 18,000; Referees: Litvinov, Khudoerko (RUS)

9 June 1999; 20:30	Sweden	33–26	Norway	Port Said Hall, Port Said; Attendance: 2,500; Referees: Migas, Bavas (GRE)
9 June 1999; 20:30		(13–10)		Port Said Hall, Port Said; Attendance: 2,500; Referees: Migas, Bavas (GRE)

9 June 1999; 20:30	FR Yugoslavia	30–23	Croatia	Mubarak Hall, Ismailia; Attendance: 2,500; Referees: Gallego, Lamas (ESP)
9 June 1999; 20:30	Nenad Peruničić 10	(15–9)	?	Mubarak Hall, Ismailia; Attendance: 2,500; Referees: Gallego, Lamas (ESP)
9 June 1999; 20:30	5× (suspension)	Serbia	3× (suspension)	Mubarak Hall, Ismailia; Attendance: 2,500; Referees: Gallego, Lamas (ESP)

9 June 1999; 21:45	Tunisia	22–24	Egypt	Cairo Stadium – Hall 1, Cairo; Attendance: 25,000; Referees: Øie, Høgsnes (NOR)
9 June 1999; 21:45		(13–14)		Cairo Stadium – Hall 1, Cairo; Attendance: 25,000; Referees: Øie, Høgsnes (NOR)

=== Quarterfinals ===
11 June 1999; 14:00	Spain	23–18	France	Cairo Stadium – Hall 1, Cairo; Attendance: 6,000; Referees: Pendić, Majstorović (SCG)
11 June 1999; 14:00	Rafael Guijosa 6	(12–9)	Fernandez, Stoecklin 5	Cairo Stadium – Hall 1, Cairo; Attendance: 6,000; Referees: Pendić, Majstorović (SCG)
11 June 1999; 14:00	3× (suspension)	Marca	3× (suspension)	Cairo Stadium – Hall 1, Cairo; Attendance: 6,000; Referees: Pendić, Majstorović (SCG)

11 June 1999; 16:15	Cuba	26–33	Sweden	Cairo Stadium – Hall 1, Cairo; Attendance: 23,000; Referees: Litvinov, Khudoerko (RUS)
11 June 1999; 16:15		(13–19)		Cairo Stadium – Hall 1, Cairo; Attendance: 23,000; Referees: Litvinov, Khudoerko (RUS)

11 June 1999; 18:30	FR Yugoslavia	22–21	Germany	Cairo Stadium – Hall 1, Cairo; Attendance: 25,000; Referees: Boye, Jensen (DEN)
11 June 1999; 18:30	Vladan Matić 6	(10–12)	?	Cairo Stadium – Hall 1, Cairo; Attendance: 25,000; Referees: Boye, Jensen (DEN)
11 June 1999; 18:30	7× (suspension)	Serbia	?× (suspension)	Cairo Stadium – Hall 1, Cairo; Attendance: 25,000; Referees: Boye, Jensen (DEN)

11 June 1999; 20:45	Russia	26–20	Egypt	Cairo Stadium – Hall 1, Cairo; Attendance: 25,000; Referees: Bülow, Lübker (GER)
11 June 1999; 20:45		(11–8)		Cairo Stadium – Hall 1, Cairo; Attendance: 25,000; Referees: Bülow, Lübker (GER)

=== 5–8th place semifinals ===
13 June 1999; 14:00	Cuba	22–23	Germany	Cairo Stadium – Hall 1, Cairo; Attendance: 4,000; Referees: Kohout, Dolejš (CZE)
13 June 1999; 14:00		(11–12)		Cairo Stadium – Hall 1, Cairo; Attendance: 4,000; Referees: Kohout, Dolejš (CZE)

13 June 1999
16:15
Egypt
25–27 (ET)
France
Cairo Stadium – Hall 1, Cairo
Attendance: 8,000
Referees: Gallego, Lamas (ESP)

(12–13)

FT: 22–22 ET: 3–5

=== Semifinals ===
13 June 1999; 18:00	FR Yugoslavia	22–23	Sweden	Cairo Stadium – Hall 1, Cairo; Attendance: 4,500; Referees: Garcia, Moreno (FRA)
13 June 1999; 18:00	Nedeljko Jovanović 6	(11–9)	?	Cairo Stadium – Hall 1, Cairo; Attendance: 4,500; Referees: Garcia, Moreno (FRA)
13 June 1999; 18:00	3× (suspension)	Report	?× (suspension)	Cairo Stadium – Hall 1, Cairo; Attendance: 4,500; Referees: Garcia, Moreno (FRA)

13 June 1999; 20:45	Spain	21–22	Russia	Cairo Stadium – Hall 1, Cairo; Attendance: 2,000; Referees: Boye, Jensen (DEN)
13 June 1999; 20:45	Demetrio Lozano 5	(9–11)	Eduard Koksharov 7	Cairo Stadium – Hall 1, Cairo; Attendance: 2,000; Referees: Boye, Jensen (DEN)
13 June 1999; 20:45	7× (suspension) 1× (red card)	Marca	5× (suspension)	Cairo Stadium – Hall 1, Cairo; Attendance: 2,000; Referees: Boye, Jensen (DEN)

=== Seventh place game ===
14 June 1999; 18:00	Egypt	35–28	Cuba	Cairo Stadium – Hall 1, Cairo; Attendance: 5,000; Referees: Kohout, Dolejš (CZE)
14 June 1999; 18:00		(15–14)		Cairo Stadium – Hall 1, Cairo; Attendance: 5,000; Referees: Kohout, Dolejš (CZE)

=== Fifth place game ===
14 June 1999; 20:30	France	21–26	Germany	Cairo Stadium – Hall 1, Cairo; Attendance: 2,000; Referees: Litvinov, Khudoerko (RUS)
14 June 1999; 20:30		(10–14)		Cairo Stadium – Hall 1, Cairo; Attendance: 2,000; Referees: Litvinov, Khudoerko (RUS)

=== Bronze medal game ===
15 June 1999; 18:00	Spain	24–27	FR Yugoslavia	Cairo Stadium – Hall 1, Cairo; Attendance: 20,000; Referees: Øie, Høgsnes (NOR)
15 June 1999; 18:00	Rafael Guijosa 8	(14–12)	Blažo Lisičić 7	Cairo Stadium – Hall 1, Cairo; Attendance: 20,000; Referees: Øie, Høgsnes (NOR)
15 June 1999; 18:00	3× (suspension)	Marca; Serbia	3× (suspension)	Cairo Stadium – Hall 1, Cairo; Attendance: 20,000; Referees: Øie, Høgsnes (NOR)

=== Final ===
15 June 1999; 21:30	Russia	24–25	Sweden	Cairo Stadium – Hall 1, Cairo; Attendance: 23,000; Referees: Bülow, Lübker (GER)
15 June 1999; 21:30	Aleksandr Tuchkin 6	(14–12)	Stefan Lövgren 7	Cairo Stadium – Hall 1, Cairo; Attendance: 23,000; Referees: Bülow, Lübker (GER)
15 June 1999; 21:30	2× (suspension)	Marca	3× (suspension) 1× (red card)	Cairo Stadium – Hall 1, Cairo; Attendance: 23,000; Referees: Bülow, Lübker (GER)

== Ranking and statistics ==
=== Final standings ===
Gold medal	Sweden
Silver medal	Russia
Bronze medal	FR Yugoslavia
4	Spain
5	Germany
6	France
7	Egypt
8	Cuba
9	Denmark
10	Croatia
11	Hungary
12	Tunisia
13	Norway
14	South Korea
15	Algeria
16	Brazil
17	Morocco
18	Macedonia
19	Kuwait
20	China
21	Argentina
22	Saudi Arabia
23	Nigeria
24	Australia

Qualified for the 2000 Summer Olympics

1999 Men's World Champions

Sweden
Fourth Title

Team roster

Peter Gentzel, Magnus Wislander, Ola Lindgren, Henrik Andersson, Stefan Lövgren, Pierre Thorsson, Magnus Andersson, Ljubomir Vranjes, Tomas Svensson, Thomas Sivertsson, Martin Frändesjö, Johan Petersson, Christian Eriksson, Staffan Olsson and Mathias Franzén.
Head coach: Bengt Johansson.

=== All-star Team ===
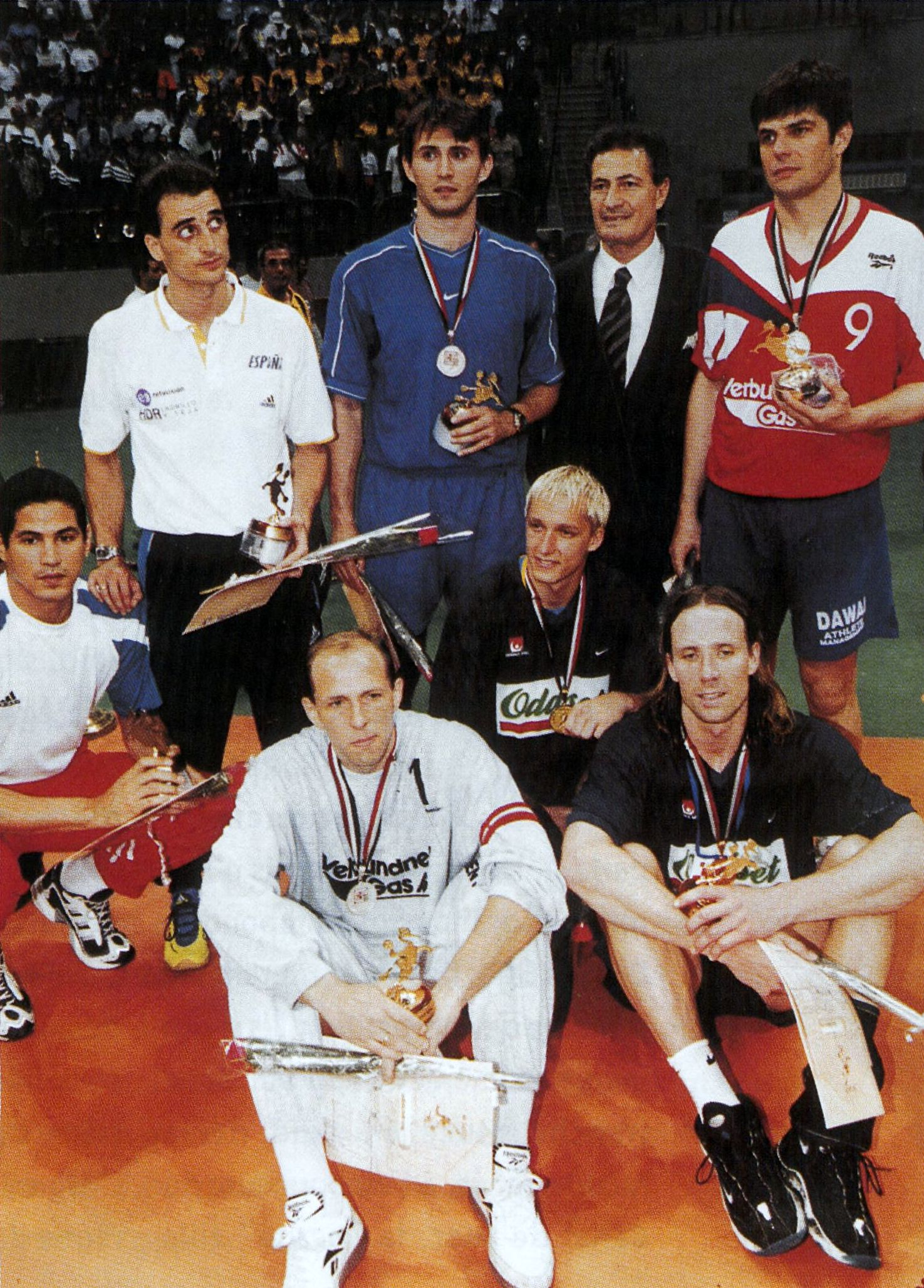
All-star Team: Guijosa, Jovanović, Mustafa (IHF president), Kudinov; Uríos, Petersson; Lavrov and Olsson.

- Best player: Stefan Lovgren (SWE)
- Goalkeeper: Andrey Lavrov (RUS)
- Left wing: Rafael Guijosa (ESP)
- Left back: Vasily Kudinov (RUS)
- Center back: Nedeljko Jovanović (FRY)
- Pivot : Rolando Uríos (CUB)
- Right back: Staffan Olsson (SWE)
- Right wing: Johan Petersson (SWE)

=== Top goalscorers ===
Rank	Name	Team	Goals	Shots	%
1	Rolando Uríos	Cuba	57	85	67.06
2	Rafael Guijosa	Spain	50	62	80.65
3	Stefan Lövgren	Sweden	46	83	55.42
4	Julio Fis	Cuba	43	106	40.57
4	József Éles	Hungary	43	71	60.56
6	Stefan Kretzschmar	Germany	41	67	61.19
6	Mohamed Madi	Tunisia	41	69	59.42
6	Nenad Peruničić	FR Yugoslavia	41	73	56.16
6	Yoon Kyung-shin	South Korea	41	79	51.90
10	Andrej Golic	France	38	62	61.29

Source: Egypt99

=== Top goalkeepers ===
Rank	Name	Team	%
1	Christian Ramota	Germany	46.2
2	David Barrufet	Spain	44.3
3	Tomas Svensson	Sweden	42.9
4	Andrey Lavrov	Russia	41.1
5	Peter Gentzel	Sweden	40.8
6	Toufik Hakem	Algeria	40.5
7	Zoran Đorđić	FR Yugoslavia	40.4
8	Søren Haagen	Norway	39.3
9	Vladimir Rivero	Cuba	38.9
10	Christian Gaudin	France	37.3

== Medalists ==
Gold	Silver	Bronze
Sweden: Peter Gentzel; Tomas Svensson; Martin Boquist; Magnus Wislander; Tomas Sivertsson; Ola Lindgren; Martin Frändesjö; Jonas Ernelind; Johan Petersson; Stefan Lövgren; Christian Eriksson; Pierre Thorsson; Staffan Olsson; Magnus Andersson; Mathias Franzén; Ljubomir Vranjes; Henrik Andersson Head coach : Mr. Bengt Johansson	Russia: Dmitry Filippov; Valery Gopin; Vyacheslav Gorpishin; Oleg Grebnev; Oleg Khodkov; Eduard Koksharov; Denis Krivoshlykov; Vasily Kudinov; Stanislav Kulinchenko; Andrey Lavrov; Igor Lavrov; Sergey Pogorelov; Pavel Sukosyan; Dmitri Torgovanov; Aleksandr Tuchkin; Lev Voronin Head coach : Mr. Vladimir Maksimov	FR Yugoslavia: Zoran Đorđić; Nebojša Golić; Nedeljko Jovanović; Petar Kapisoda; Branko Kokir; Ivan Lapčević; Blažo Lisičić; Nenad Maksić; Vladan Matić; Žikica Milosavljević; Dejan Perić; Nenad Peruničić; Vladimir Petrić; Ratko Nikolić; Dragan Škrbić (Captain); Arpad Šterbik Head coach : Mr. Zoran Živković
