= Mathias Franzén =

Swedish handball player (born 1975)

Personal information
- Full name: Karl Gustav Mathias Franzén
- Nationality: Swedish
- Born: 22 February 1975 (age 51) Vreta Kloster, Sweden
- Height: 1.89 m (6 ft 2 in)

Sport
- Sport: Handball
- Position: Left back
- Number: 15

Youth career
- Years: Team
- 1981–1995: HK Aranäs

Senior clubs
- Years: Team
- -1995: HK Aranäs
- 1995-2001: Redbergslids IK
- 2001-2004: FC Barcelona
- 2004-2007: HSG Nordhorn
National team
Years	Team	Apps	(Gls)
1999-2006	Sweden	123	(283)

Teams managed
- 2009-2012: HK Varberg
Medal record
Olympic Games
Silver medal – second place	2000 Sydney	Team
European Championship
Gold medal – first place	2000 Croatia
World Championship
Gold medal – first place	1999 Egypt

Karl Gustav Mathias Franzén (born 22 February 1975) is a Swedish handball player and coach.

He won the 1999 World Men's Handball Championship and the 2000 European Men's Handball Championship with the Swedish team. In 2000 he was a member of the Swedish handball team won the silver medal in the Olympic tournament. He played five matches and scored 25 goals.

== Career ==
Franzén started his career at HK Aranäs before joining Swedish top club Redbergslids IK. Here he won the Swedish championship 5 times. In 2001 he joined Spanish club FC Barcelona. Here he won the Spanish Championship and EHF European League in the 2002–03 season.

In 2004 he joined German Bundesliga team HSG Nordhorn, where he played for the rest of his career.

== Coaching career ==
From 2009 to 2012 he was the coach of HK Varberg in Division 1.

== Personal life ==
He is the twin brother of Anders Franzén and smaller brother of Mikael Franzén, who were both handball players. They all started at HK Aranäs and later moved to Redbergslids IK.

He is educated as a cook.
