= Curt Wadmark =

Swedish handball player (1915-2003)

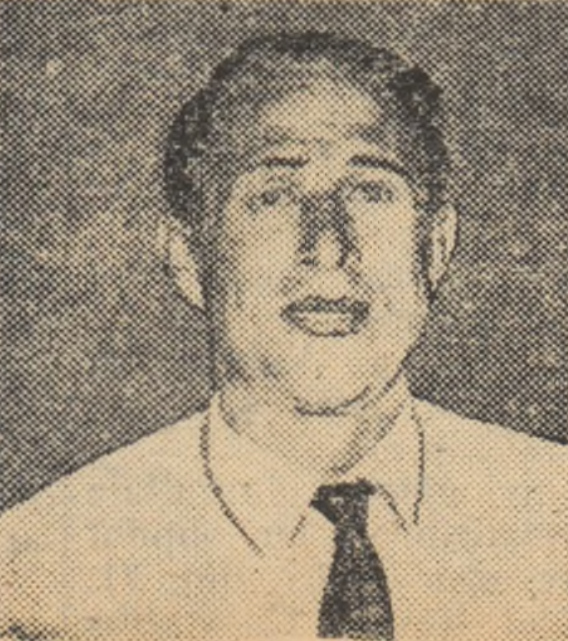

Curt Wadmark (pronounced [ˈkɵʈː ˈvɑ̂ːdmark]; 30 January 1915 – 21 July 2003) was a Swedish handball player, coach and administrator. He played for IFK Lund during the club's only season in the top division in 1938–39. At the end of the season the team withdrew from the league and Wadmark moved to IFK Kristianstad due to the lack of a venue for handball in Lund. He helped the team to two second places in the league and was a member of the team that won the club's first Swedish Championship in 1941, scoring two goals in the final. After that season he returned to Lund to play for the newly-founded Lugi HF, where he played until 1947. The club started in the second division, where they remained throughout Wadmark's spell at the club. He played 76 matches and scored 145 goals for the club. He played 12 matches for the Swedish national field handball team, including four at the 1938 World Championship.

In 1948 Wadmark became coach for the Swedish national handball team. He led them to the country's two first World Championship titles in 1954 and 1958, as well as third place in 1961 and second place in 1964. As coach of the Swedish national field handball team he won the World Championship in 1948 and finished second in 1952. He remained national team coach until 1967.

Wadmark helped found the International Handball Federation in 1946 and was a member of its board for 44 years until 1990. He was chairman of the Swedish Handball Federation from 1967 to 1973 and of the Scanian Handball Federation from 1969 to 1982. Additionally, he was a board member of the Swedish Sports Confederation from 1971 to 1983.
