= Port Said Hall =

Sporting arena in Port Said, Egypt

Port Said Indoor Hall (Arabic: صالة بورسعيد المغطاة) is an Olympic-standard, multi-use indoor sporting arena located in Al-Zohour district in Port Said, Egypt. The capacity of the arena is 5,000 spectators. Hosts competitions of Handball, Basketball and Volleyball.

It was built in time for the 1999 World Men's Handball Championship. Port Said is the site of further development by the Ministry of Youth and Sports.
