= Wargo =

Wargo is a surname. Notable people with the surname include:

- Christian Wargo (born 1976), American singer
- John Wargo (1938–2017), American politician
- Joseph G. Wargo (1922–1999), American politician
- Tom Wargo (born 1942), American golfer
