= HK Drott =

Swedish handball club

- Full name: Handbollsklubben Drott Halmstad
- Short name: HKD
- Founded: 10 March 1936; 89 years ago
- Arena: Halmstad Arena, Halmstad
- Capacity: 4,000
Home	Away

HK Drott Halmstad is a handball club, based in Halmstad, Sweden. The club has won the Swedish Championship eleven times, last in 2013. Together with Redbergslids IK, HK Drott have dominated Swedish handball between 1984 and 2003. This club has had many famous players, among them Magnus Andersson, Ola Lindgren, Bengt Johansson and Göran Bengtsson.

Location of HK Drott

== History ==
=== The founding ===
HK Drott was founded on 10 March 1936 by Lars-Erik Dymne, Erik Månsson, Arvid Fridh and Ingvar Svensson, all 13 years of age; the club was originally formed as a football club. A few games were then played in 1937, with HK Drott winning all games played in the rural areas, while at least 3 of the games played in town were lost. The club also bought their first sports kit, based on the Arsenal F.C. model, and for practice the club rented I 16's gym. When playing away against Laholm, the club members pretended to be children to be able to buy the cheaper children's tickets.

Several more football matches were played in 1938, but during this year handball became stronger within the club and the first handball matches were played against Läroverkets realskolelag. At this time no centre halves were used so only 6 outfielders and 3 substitutes were used. In 1939 the football part of the club lost a number of key players to their larger local rivals, the same year the handball section successfully filed for entrance to both the Swedish Sports Confederation and Swedish Handball Federation, and the club participated in Division 3.

In 1940 it was decided to shut down the football section completely and on 20 September the same year the name was changed from Fotbollsklubben, F.C., to Handbollsklubben Drott. The club also ended up last in Div. 3 the same year. Drott ended up last in 1941 as well, however Halmstads BK declined its place in Div. 2 and the Federation called for a playoff for the position between newly demoted IF Cate and HK Drott. Cate won the game by 10–0. To celebrate the club's 5 years of existence a tournament was played between all the teams in the Halmstad, which was won by IS Halmia. The club's first success came in 1942 as it was able to win Div. 3 and gain promotion to Div. 2. The success continued in 1943 as Drott won Div. 2 in their first year of participation. They then played qualification games against Ystads IF and Pantarholmens SK; Ystads IF won the qualification and were promoted. 1944 saw a change of the league system which was remodeled in football style, creating only four divisions. Drott was placed in Division 2 Södra and were relegated to Div. 3 in 1945 as the club ended up last in the league. The club's first international game was played that year against IF Vidar from Copenhagen.

=== The growth ===
In 1946 all parts of the club played in total 47 games and lost 11 of them. The home games were played in a remodeled aircraft hangar at F14, the local air force wing; the games attracted a large number of spectators despite the remoteness of the base. Drott returned to Div. 2 in 1947 after winning Div. 3. They achieved 5th place in 1948 and won an exhibition game against IK Heim from Allsvenskan. In 1949 Hasse Carlsson became the new chairman and after some intensive work both he and the teams in the club were able to establish a long term stable economy. An exhibition game was played against Danish champions IF Ajax which ended in a draw, 14–14.

In 1950 HK Drott made its first trip abroad to Germany and played a tournament there. However, back home the club's playing ground at F14 was closed, but after some intense negotiations the club was able to play its games at the local tennis hall, while the in-between game practice continued at I16. Drott was able to reach 3rd place in Div. 2 that season. In 1951 Drott again traveled abroad to play a new tournament, this time in Germany and Austria. Drott finished 2nd in Div. 2 after losing the series final at home against IFK Karlskrona. Drott yet again traveled abroad to play a friendly tournament, this time in Germany and Denmark, while the club ended up in 5th place in the 1951–52 season. 1952–53 saw a new friendly tournament abroad while none of the club's teams did any good in the league. Following a 2nd place in 1953–54 season the club finished in a relegation place in 1954–55 season, however following objections against an incorrect judgment from the match referee in the last game against Wargo, the club was allowed to remain in Div. 2.

In 1956 a new sports hall was opened, resolving earlier problems with where the home matches were supposed to be played. Drott achieved a 3rd place in Div. 2 the same season. In 1956–57 both the senior and youth teams traveled to Berlin and Germany to play a friendly tournament, the club then ended up in 4th place in the league. In 1957–58 Drott were able to defeat the Dutch national handball team during a tournament in Germany and the Netherlands. Five of the team's players participated in the South Swedish Team playing an annual New Year's tournament in Berlin. The club ended up in 6th position in Div. 2. 1958–59 saw new friendly tournaments abroad, the seniors visiting Berlin again, while the youth team played matches in Paris and Amsterdam. Drott ended up in 2nd place behind LUGI HF, only losing 4 matches in the season. Drott ended up 2nd again in 1959–60, while Vikingarnas IF completely dominated the league. Drott ended up 2nd in the 1960–61 season, this time behind Ystads IF.

=== Success ===
The 1961–62 became a very successful year for the club; it was for the second time able to win Div. 2 and then win the qualification to Allsvenskan against IF Hallby, IF Start and Lundens BK. The team's first season in Allsvenskan in 1962–63 was plagued by the loss of several players, however the club were able to achieve a 7th place. The club arranged two World Men's Handball Championship games, Japan against Spain and West Germany against Romania. After having the chance to remaining in Allsvenskan Drott was eventually relegated back down to Div. 2 in the 1963–64 season. The youth team won the NILOC tournament in Amsterdam and the club left the Allsvenska serieföreningen after a disagreement between the club and the organization. Following a generational change in 1964–65 the club finished in 5th place in Div. 2, the supporters failed the club, as only about 600 people came to see each home game, compared to over 1,300 the previous year.

The supporters however returned strongly in 1965–66, with about 1,000 per game, and a new attendance record was set against local rivals HBP with 2,831 spectators. After wins against their top competitors and losses against teams in the middle of the league, the club gained a 3rd place. In the 1966–67 season duels with local competitor HBP for the 1st place spot, Drott just failed on inferior goal difference after both teams ended up on 30 points by the season's end. HK Drott won the 1967–68 season 9 points ahead of IF Hallby after the league system had been remodeled yet again and again return to Allsvenskan. Drott was able to reach the final in Svenska Cupen; they were however then defeated by SoIK Hellas. HK Drott won Allsvenskan in 1968–69 ahead of Hellas, the team however then lost the new playoffs against Hellas who in turn became Swedish champions. Drott yet again won the league in 1969–70 and this time reached the playoff finals, yet again against Hellas, and again were defeated. The 1970–71 season started with friendly games in Iceland, including a game against Iceland's national team. After a poor performance at home Drott ended up in 5th place, just 1 point away from the playoffs.

The club reached a 3rd place in Allsvenskan in the 1971–72 season, however Hellas turned out to be too strong yet again in the playoffs, but not until a third decisive game had been played. Drott became runners-up in the 1972–73 season Allsvenska and were yet again defeated in the playoff semifinals by Hellas; the club lost only 4 of 18 matches in the league. Drott ended up in 6th place in the 1973–74 season, with Bengt Hansson becoming the league's top goal scorer.

=== Champions and Bengt Johansson ===
The 1974–75 season started badly for Drott, with Bengt Johansson as playing head coach, following injury to last season's top goal-scorer Bengt Hansson; the club found itself second from last by the end of the year with only five points, however after a strong spring the club was able to gain a playoff position in the final game of the league. Following two drawn matches against Västra Frölunda IF Handboll the club won the third and final match, they then faced IFK Kristianstad in the playoff finals. Achieving a draw in the first match they were able to win the second by 14–12, becoming Swedish champions for the first time ever; the final match was played in front of a sold out stand. Drotts attempt to follow up the previous season's success in 1975–76 with Karl-Erik Einerth as head coach, resulted in a complete failure due to injuries on key players. Drott conceded only 310 goals with only Hellas conceding fewer, however the club also scored the fewest goals and ended second from last. Drott was however able to remain in Allsvenskan after defeating both IF Saab and Kiruna AIF in the relegation-promotion playoffs; the participation in the European Cup ended with defeat against Fredensborg/Ski in the first round. Bengt Johansson returned as head coach to the 1976–77 season and Drott ended up in ninth place. Drott just barely missed out on the league title in 1977–78, even after scoring the most goals (547 in total), but eventually won the playoffs and became Swedish champions for the second time in four seasons. HK Drott was awarded the Årets IF (eng: athletic association of the year) by Hallands Idrottsförbund.

HK Drott dominated Allsvenskan through the entire 1978–79 season, but just at the end fell to fourth place. The club moved its playoff matches to Sannarpshallen, the local ice hockey rink, which became a major success with spectators, exceeding 12,000, coming to see the games. HK Drott won its third Swedish champions title after a final match in Ystad against Ystads IF. In the after matches on both the Faroe Islands and in Paris, the club just missed out on the quarterfinal in the European Cup. HK Drott continued to play strongly in the 1979–80 season winning the league before being defeated by LUGI in the playoffs; in the European Cup Drott were able to defeat Grasshopper Club Zürich in order to reach the quarter-final, where Valur from Iceland were able to go from trailing behind to victory and thus kick Drott out of the competition. Drott ended up in fifth place in 1980–81, but won Svenska Cupen; in the European Cup the club was directly kicked out by Hungarian team PLER KC. Drott won the league in 1981–82 but were defeated in the playoff finals by IK Heim, however Drott gained revenge as they defeated Heim in Svenska Cupen just a few days later. Drott ended up in sixth place in 1982–83 season and in the European Cup the club was able to reach the quarter-finals after defeating Atlas from Finland and Ivry from France; in the quarter-final Zeljeznicar from Yugoslavia proved too strong. Drott struggled to reach third place in the 1983–84 season; however, the club was able to win the playoffs to become Swedish champions for the fourth time. The club also reached the final in Svenska Cupen; however, Västra Frölunds proved too strong there.

Bengt Johansson left the club after nine years prior to the 1984–85 season, to take time out. He was replaced by Ulf Schefvert. The club ended up in second place in Allsvenskan and were after five playoff final matches defeated in the last seconds of the fifth match by Redbergslids IK. During the playoffs the first ever live coverage of a game at club level in Sweden was recorded in Sannarpshallen. The club won Svenska Cupen, however they rejected play in the European Cup due to economical shortage. Bengt Johansson returned to the club prior to the 1985–86 season, the club ending up in second place in the league. They were drawn against the league winner Redbergslids in the playoffs and were eventually defeated; participation in the European Cup went somewhat better as they were able to defeat HC Empor Rostock from East Germany and then being defeated, although putting up a good game, against Romanian HC Minaur in the quarter-final. The team ended up in second place in the league after conceding the fewest goals, in the playoffs Redbergslid became too strong again over four matches. Drott was defeated in Svenska Cupen as well by IFK Skövde and CSKA Moscow from the Soviet Union proved too strong in the European Cup. The 1987–88 league season ended as the years before, Redbergslids IK won Allsvenskan with HK Drott in second place. RIK were the main favorites to win the playoffs again and claim their fourth straight championship, however Drott stunned people by winning all three final games in a row, winning the last match on a penalty shootout, claiming their fifth Swedish championship. Drott was again defeated in international play by Romanian HC Minaur, and lost the Svenska Cupen to RIK. Bengt Johansson left the club after twelve years, winning five Swedish championships during the time and two as a player in the club. Ulf Schefvert returned to the club for the 1988–89 season; Drott dominated the league and eventually won it, the club were able to defeat LUGI after some hard matches and reached the playoff finals, again against RIK. This time RIK won three games in a row claiming the championship title, after defeating Finnish BK 46 Karis and Hungarian Raba Vasas ETÖ, then faced FC Barcelona in the quarter-final and defeated them in both matches. Barcelona's first defeat at home in international competition for six years, Steaua București then proved too strong in the semifinals.

=== The 1990s and onward ===
Yet again the 1989–90 league season ended with RIK in first place and Drott second, however Drott were able to reach the playoff finals in which they defeat IF Saab claiming their sixth Swedish championship title, the club participated in the Cup Winners Cup and reached the final after defeating UHF Stjarnan from Iceland, Ionikos Aten from Greece, GKS Wybrzeze from Poland and Gummersbach from West Germany, the club face Teka Santander from Spain in the final, Santander however proved too strong, Sweden won the 1990 World Men's Handball Championship in Czechoslovakia with Ola Lindgren and Magnus Andersson from the club in the team, the national team was also coached by Bengt Johansson.

HK Drott completely dominated the 1990–91 season, the league now remade into a fall and a spring season and renamed Elitserien, HK Drott won both the fall and spring season, taking 51 points out of a total 60, the club then defeated LUGI in two matches in a best out of three semifinal, before defeating Irsta HF in three straight games in the finals, HK Drott became both the best home- and away team of the entire season, an injury suffered HK Drott were then defeated in the quarterfinals of the European Cup by Russian Dynamo Astrakan. HK Drott failed to repeat any of last season's success in 1991–92, ending up in 5th place in the league before being defeated by eventual champions Ystads IF in the playoffs and in the European Cup the club was defeated in the first round by Icelandic Valur. A series of injuries destroyed the 1992–93 season as the club reached 4th place in Elitserien before being defeated in the semifinal by RIK, Ulf Schefvert departed the club to take over the Danish national team. Göran Bengtsson took over as head coach and Magnus Andersson returned to the club prior to the 1993–94 season, the club yet against won both the fall and spring seasons and also the semifinals, before defeating IK Sävehof in three straight final games, thus claiming their eighth championship title, in the EHF Challenge Cup Drott defeated Intercollage from Cyprus with 100–21, then defeating Cancaya Ankara from Turkey in the Round of 16, then defeating Nova Oprema/Prevent from Slovenia in the quarter-finals, Paris SGAsnieres from France were defeated in the semifinals, however German club TUSEM Essen proved too strong in the finals.

Drott dominated the 1994–95 league season, again claiming 1st place, the club then defeated Sävehof to reach the finals in the playoffs against RIK, Drott then falls in the fifth game and RIK became champions, the club was then defeated in Europe by Badel Zagreb from Yugoslavia, in a friendly tournament in Flensburg Drott defeated the Russian national team. HK Drott ended up in 5th place in Elitserien in the 1995–96 season, then defeated IF Guif in the quarterfinals before being defeated by RIK in the semifinals, due to a strike both international matches against Swiss Borba Luzern were played in Switzerland and it ended in defeat for HK Drott, Göran Bengtsson retires as coach for the club. HK Drott hires Ulf Sivertsson as new coach before the 1996–97 season and somewhat against expectations Drott won Elitserien however Guif turned out be too strong in the playoff semifinals. A large number of injuries caused problems for the club in the 1997–98, the club ended up in 3rd place in Elitserien and after victories against HP Warta and Guif, the club reached the finals in the playoffs, however RIK were too strong and won. Magnus Andersson returned to the club to the 1998–99 season and the club were able to reach the finals in the playoffs where after four games against RIK the club claimed its ninth Swedish championship title.

=== Present day ===
RIK won the 1999–00 league series and HK Drott were yet again in 2nd place, the club then defeated Alingsås HK and Guif in the playoffs before losing the final to RIK, in Europe the club was defeated by Polish club Iskra-Lider Markel. RIK yet again claimed 1st place in the 2000–01 league series with Drott coming in 2nd place, Alingsås was defeated in the playoffs before Guif proved too strong in the semifinals. Magnus Andersson took over as head coach to the 2001–02 season, Drott ended up in 3rd place behind RIK and Ystad, in the playoffs Drott defeated Guif in the quarter-finals and then LUGI in semifinals, before facing old rivals RIK in the finals, Drott were able to win both matches against RIK and win their tenth Swedish championship title.

Injuries yet again plagues the team during the 2002–03 season and the club finally ended up in 3rd place, the club then first defeated H 43 in the quarterfinals and then Sävehof in the semifinals, however RIK proved yet again too strong in the finals, a strike caused Drott to play its home games in Ljungby, ASKI Ankara from Turkey proved too strong for the club in the European games and due to the strike both games were played in Turkey. Drott shows good play in the 2003–04 season before injuries yet again caused problem and the club ended up in 4th place in the league and in the quarterfinals Ystad proved too strong, in the Cup Winners' Cup Drott first defeated Forst Brixen from Italy, Kopavogs from Iceland and then HC Karvina from the Czech Republic before Oberhausen Essen from Germany proved too strong. Drott ended up in 5th place in the league in the 2004–05 season, it then took four matches to defeat Ystad in the quarterfinals, then in the semifinals the eventual champions Sävehof proved too strong, HK Tongeren from Belgium were defeated in the Cup Winner's Cup, then Drott was defeated on goals difference after two matches against FCK Håndbold, Magnus Andersson left the club after the season, he becomes new coach for FCK Håndbold, the club that earlier the same year defeated him and Drott.

== Sports Hall information ==
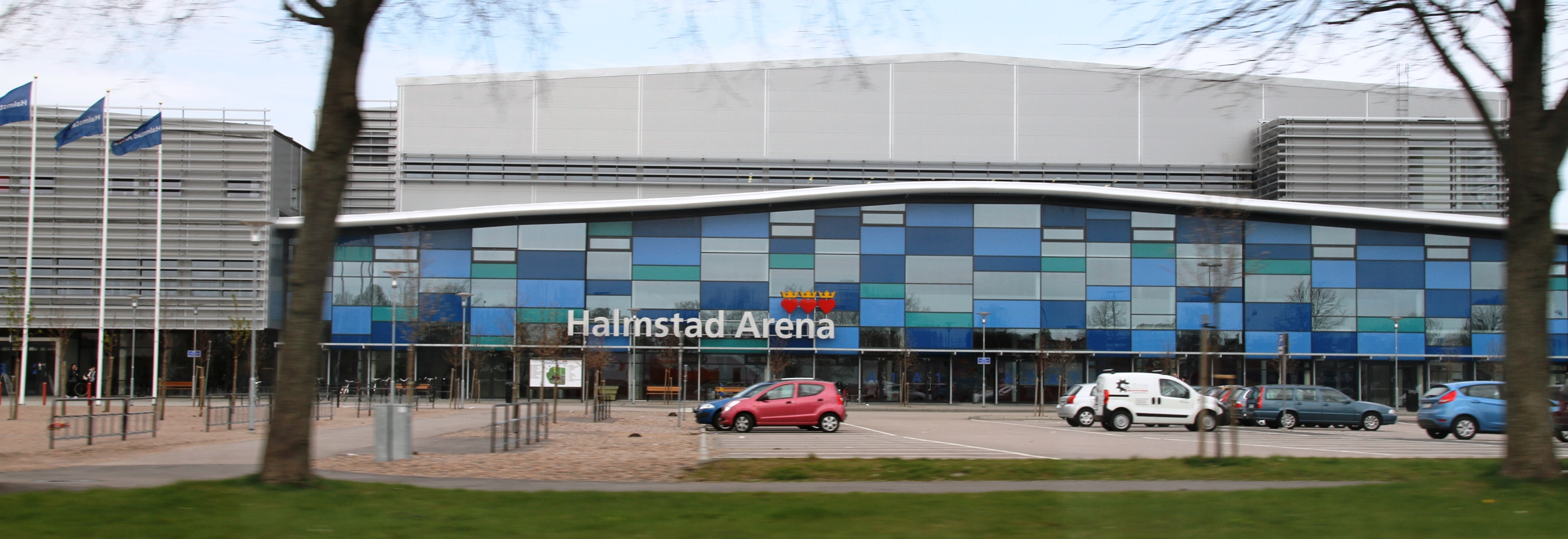
Home hall: Halmstad Arena

- Name: – Halmstad Arena
- City: – Halmstad
- Capacity: – 4000
- Address: – Växjövägen 11, 302 44 Halmstad, Sweden

== Kits ==
HOME
2012–13	2015–16	2016–19	2019-20	2020-

AWAY
2013–14	2015–16	2018–19	2019-20	2020-

== Current squad ==
Nr.	Name	Nationality	Position
2	Mathias Adjovi	Sweden	L9
4	Hasse Karlsson	Sweden	M6
5	Martin Bystedt	Sweden	R6
6	Johnny Olsson	Sweden	L9
7	Michael Mattsson	Sweden	L9
8	Viktor Johansson	Sweden	M6
8	Miha Gorenšek	Slovenia	M6
9	David Löfgren	Sweden	L6
10	Magnus Persson	Sweden	R9
11	Jesper Adolfsson	Sweden	M9
12	Robert Bladh	Sweden	GK
13	Anton Halén	Sweden	R9
14	Johannes Grönlund	Sweden	M9
15	Robin Eriksson	Sweden	L9
16	Ola Ebeling	Sweden	GK
18	Christoffer Johansson	Sweden	M9
20	Gunnar Stein Jónsson	Iceland	M9
21	Stephen Nielsen	Denmark	GK
23	Andreas Palmay	Sweden	L6
24	Said Ajkulic	Sweden	M9
26	Anton Ekberg	Sweden	M9
27	Adam Lindblom	Sweden	M9

=== Transfers ===
Transfers for the 2025–26 season

Joining

Leaving

- (Sweden) Emil Arthursson (GK) to (Sweden) HF Karlskrona

== Achievements ==
- Elitserien:

Champion (11): 1975, 1978, 1979, 1984, 1988, 1990, 1991, 1994, 1999, 2002, 2013
