= AIK Handboll =

Swedish handball club

AIK
- Full name: Allmänna Idrottsklubben
- Nickname(s): Gnaget
- Founded: 1891; 1943 (handball department)
- Arena: Solnahallen, Solna
- Capacity: 2,000
- League: Allsvenskan
- Club colours
Home	Away

AIK Handboll is the handball section in AIK. The handball section of AIK was founded in 1943. They won the Swedish Championship in 1951 and reached the final again in 1952. The handball section was closed in 1980, but reopened in 2003.

Location of AIK Handboll

== Kits ==
HOME

2018-

AWAY

2018-

== Sports Hall information ==
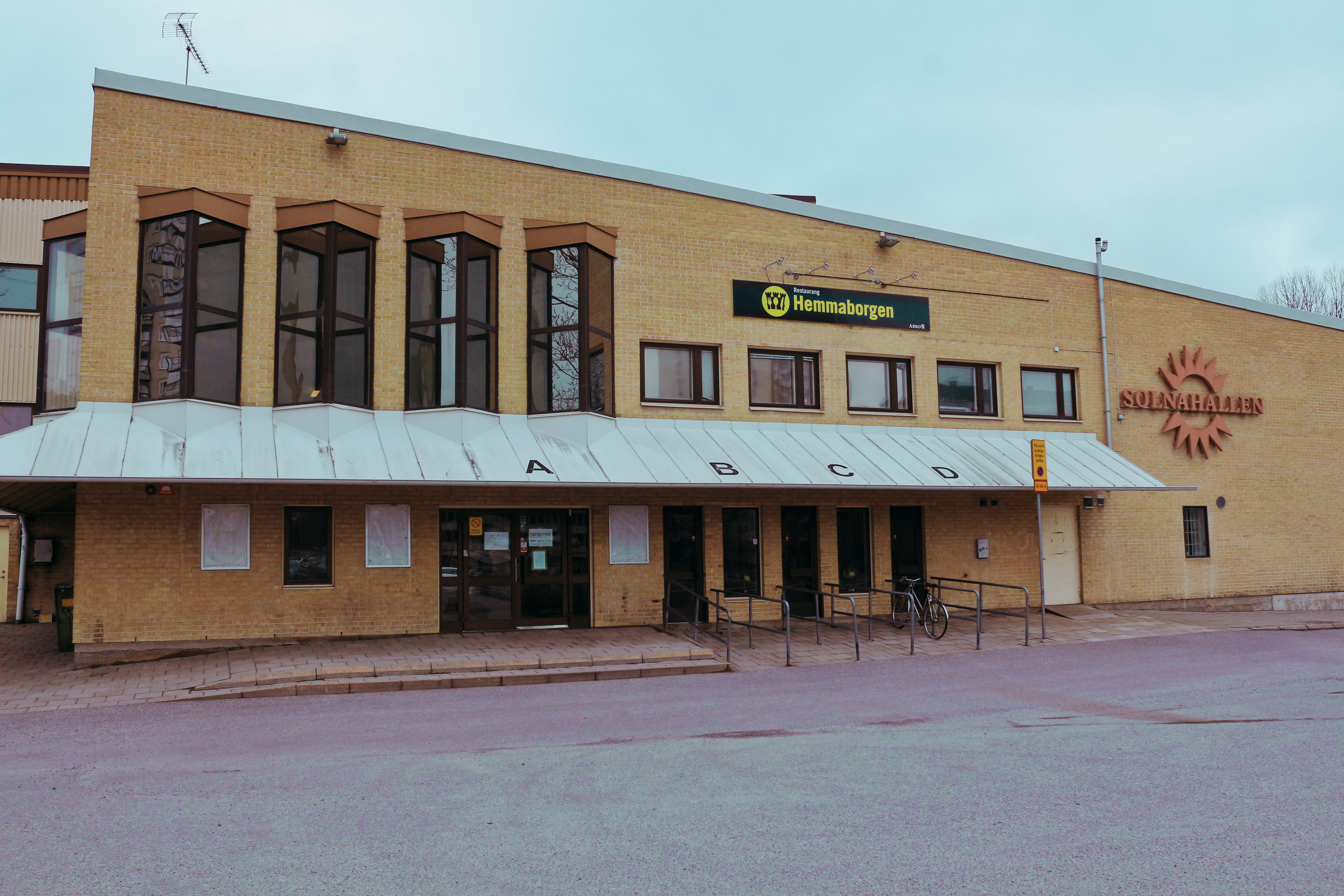
Home hall: Solnahallen

- Name: – Solnahallen
- City: – Solna
- Capacity: – 2000
- Address: – Ankdammsgatan 46, 171 67 Solna, Sweden

== Accomplishments ==
- Swedish championship:
  - Gold: 1951
