= IFK Malmö Handboll =

Swedish handball club

IFK Malmö Handbollsförening
- Full name: Idrottsföreningen Kamraterna Malmö Handbollsförening
- Founded: 1927; 98 years ago
- Arena: Stapelbäddens Idrottshall, Malmö
- Capacity: 150
- Club colours
Home	Away

IFK Malmö Handboll is the handball department of the sports club IFK Malmö. The club's colours are yellow and white.

== History ==
=== 1933-1960 ===
The handball department was founded in 1933. They made their debut in the top division, at the time known as Allsvenskan, in 1942–43, but were relegated after one season. They returned to Allsvenskan in 1945–46, but were relegated again. They were promoted back to Allsvenskan in 1949 and lasted in the league for two seasons before once again being relegated. IFK Malmö returned to Allsvenskan for the 1953–54 season, finishing fourth in the league that season. They finished second in the league in 1956–57, making them Swedish Championship silver medallists. In the following two seasons they finished fourth and third, before being relegated in 1960.

=== 1960-2004 ===
IFK Malmö were promoted to Allsvenskan again in 1969 and finished fifth, but were relegated in the following season. They returned to Allsvenskan after one season and reached the play-offs, which had been introduced to determine the Swedish champions, in 1972–73. They were eliminated by IF Saab in the semi-finals. IFK Malmö won the regular season in the following season, but lost against SoIK Hellas in the semi-finals. Two years later they again reached the playoffs, but were once again defeated in the semi-finals. They were relegated in 1976–77. They returned to the top division in 1988–89 and 2003–04, but were immediately relegated both times.

=== 2004-present day ===
IFK Malmö were promoted from the second division in 2007, but after that season the senior team merged with Malmö HP to form a new club named HK Malmö. IFK Malmö has since started a new senior team which in 2018–19 plays in Division 4, the sixth level.

Location of IFK Malmö

== Kits ==
HOME
2014–15	2016–17	2019-

AWAY
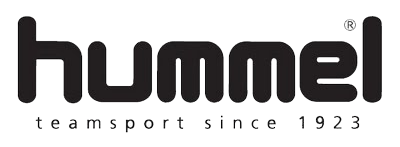
2019-

THIRD
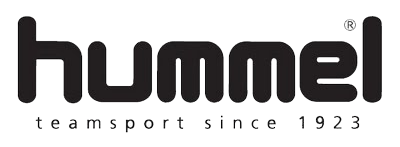
2019-
