= Örebro SK Handboll =

Swedish handball club

- Full name: Örebro Sportklubb Handboll
- Short name: ÖSK
- Founded: 1908; 118 years ago
- Arena: Idrottshuset, Örebro
- Capacity: 1,400
Home	Away

Örebro SK Handboll is a Swedish handball team located in Örebro.

== Women's team ==
In the 2003/2004 season, for the first time, a women's team from Örebro SK competed in league games, and in the following years advanced rapidly in the league system. In 2009/10, they made a successful debut in division 1 and advanced to the newly started Allsvenskan. On March 1, 2011, it was clear that Örebro SK will play in the elite series next season. Life in the Elite Series was only one year. The team only played 1 point and were relegated in the damallsvenskan again.

=== Kits ===
HOME

2016–

== Men's team ==
Örebro won Swedish Championship gold for men in 1956 and 1957 by winning the Allsvenskan. Until 1952, the Swedish Championship in cup form was decided, and during that time ÖSK won the series once (1951) and played the Swedish Championship final once, in 1950, when they lost to IK Heim. Örebro SK has played a total of 13 seasons in Sweden's highest division, most recently in 1962, but closed down handball in 1968 and other associations in Örebro, which IF Start took over and was good in the early 1970s. The club's most famous player is Rune Åhrling, who won the Allsvenskan shooting league four times and scored a total of 1,063 Allsvenskan goals. He was involved in winning World Cup gold in 1958 and played 57 A-national matches between 1950 and 1961. Reine Hjelm started some youth teams within Örebro SK Ungdom in the mid-1980s. In the 1990/1991 season, Örebro SK regained its handball section. In the first men's senior match after the new start, Örebro SK won against IF Nercia 26-20 in Risbergska school on October 2, 1990. Örebro SK won division 4 in men's handball already during the first year and after two years in division 3 they also won that series. After that, it took a few years before the team advanced to division 2, after which the team in the following years went up and down between div 2 and 3 in the Swedish league system. In 2007–2009, they played two seasons in division 1, but after that ÖSK is back at division 2 level.

=== Kits ===
HOME
2015–16	2017–

AWAY
2015–16	2017–
