= IK Heim =

Swedish handball club

- Full name: Idrottsklubben Heim
- Short name: Heim
- Founded: February 4, 1923; 102 years ago
- Dissolved: September 4, 2009; 16 years ago
- Arena: Mässhallen, Gothenburg; Aktiviteten, Mölndal
Home	Away

Idrottsklubben Heim (IK Heim) were a Swedish handball club from Gothenburg, founded in 1923. They have been Swedish champions 7 times. They won the title in 1950 (by defeating Örebro in the final), 1955, 1959, 1960 and 1962 (by winning the league). They were relegated from the top level in 1965 and did not return until 1974. In 1980, Heim reached the semifinals of the Cup Winners' Cup, where they lost to Spanish club CB Calpisa. They won two more Swedish titles in 1982 and 1983, but were relegated again in 1984. In 2005, the club merged with Mölndal HF to form IK Heim Mölndal and later Mölndal/Heim. Heim Mölndal briefly played in the top division from 2005 to 2007. In 2009, Mölndal HF was re-founded as a separate club and Heim ceased to exist.

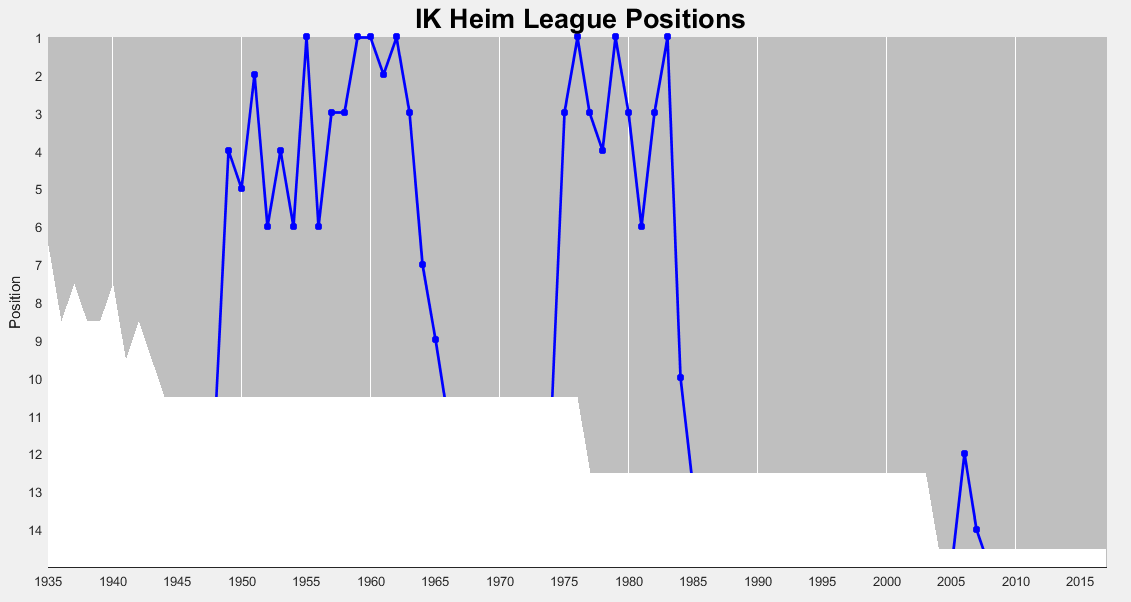
Heim's positions in the top division
