= Västerås IK Handboll =

Swedish handball club

- Full name: Västerås Idrottsklubb Handboll
- Short name: VIK

Västerås IK Handboll was the handball section of Västerås IK, a Swedish sport club based in Västerås. The club made their first appearance in Svenska mästerskapet (SM), a tournament held to determine the Swedish champions, in 1932–33. They were eliminated by Strängnäs in the first round. In 1935–36 they reached the quarterfinals, where they were defeated by SoIK Hellas. In the following season they reached the quarterfinals again, this time losing against Redbergslids IK. In 1937–38, Västerås IK made history by becoming the first team playing outside the top division (Allsvenskan) to win SM. They upset Flottans IF Karlskrona in the semi-final before defeating Djurgårdens IF in the final. The following season, their title defence ended abruptly as they failed to defend their Västmanland district title and thus failed to qualify for SM. In 1940–41 Västerås IK reached the semi-finals, where they were eliminated by IFK Kristianstad. In the same season, they were promoted to Allsvenskan for the first time. They finished third in their first season in the top-flight, which remains their best league finish. They reached the quarterfinals in SM, but lost against Stockholms-Flottans IF. The club was relegated in 1943 but returned to the top division two years later. In 1947–48, Västerås IK reached the SM semi-finals, but were again defeated by IFK Kristianstad. They were relegated from Allsvenskan in 1950–51, but still reached the semi-finals in SM in the same season, losing to AIK. They played in the final season of SM in 1951–52, but were eliminated by Norrköpings AIS in the first round. After that season, the SM tournament was discontinued and the title of Swedish Champions was awarded to the league winners. Västerås IK were promoted back to Allsvenskan in 1955, but were relegated after only one season and never returned to the top division. Västerås IK's handball section does no longer exist.

Västerås IK had a notable rivalry with 1942–43 SM finalists Västerås HF.
