= SoIK Hellas =

Swedish sports club

- Full name: Sim- och idrottsklubben Hellas
- Sport: bowling, track and field athletics, handball, swimming, orienteering, tennis, water polo soccer, table tennis, fencing, gymnastics, cross-country skiing, diving, ski orienteering, squash (earlier)
- Founded: 14 May 1899
- Team history: Pastorns gossar (1899–1912)
- Based in: Stockholm, Sweden
- Arena: Erikdsalshallen

SoIK Hellas is a sports club in Stockholm, Sweden, established on 14 May 1899 as Pastorns gossar ("The Preacher's Guys") by Katarina Parish confirmation priest Ernst Klefbeck, before changing name to SoIK Hellas in 1912, also on the initiative of Ernst Klefbeck. Nowadays running bowling, track and field athletics, handball, swimming, orienteering, tennis, and water polo, the club earlier also ran soccer, table tennis, fencing, gymnastics, cross-country skiing, diving, ski orienteering, and squash. The men's water polo team has won Swedish championship titles.

In 2009, the club decided to become an alliance club starting in 2010.

== Handball ==
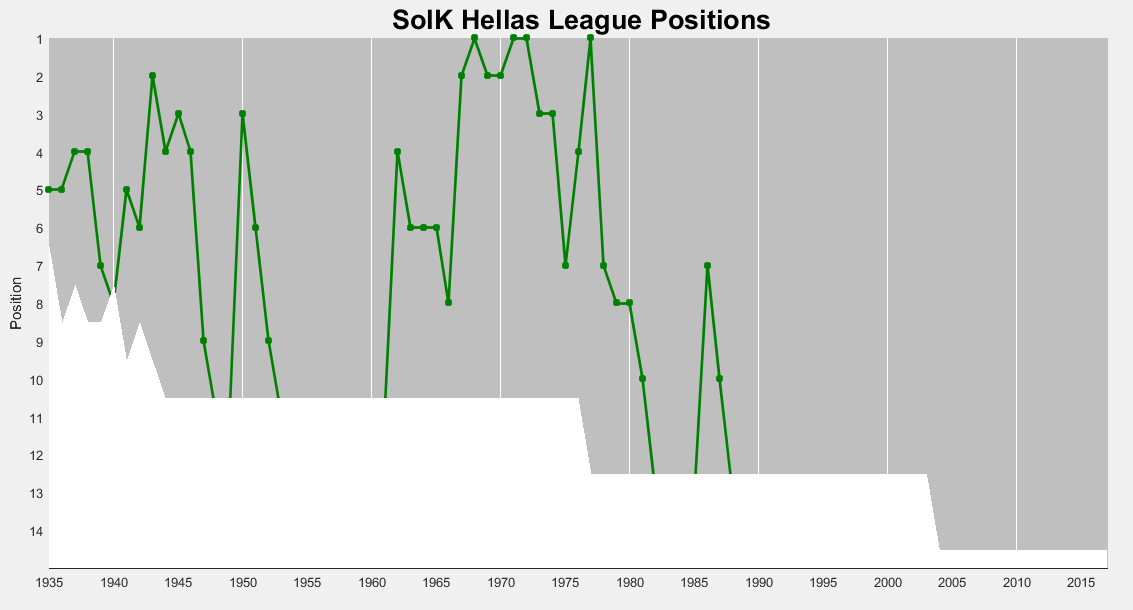
Hellas's (handball) positions in the top division

The handball team have won seven Swedish Championships (1936, 1937, 1969, 1970, 1971, 1972 and 1977). They played in the first season of Allsvenskan, the Swedish top division, finishing fifth. Until 1952, the Swedish Championship (SM) was decided as a knockout tournament independent of the league. During this time, Hellas were considered "cup specialists". Until 1946, only the district champions qualified for SM, meaning that Hellas had to compete with other Stockholm clubs to qualify. In 1935–36, Hellas again finished fifth in the league and qualified for SM for the first time. They defeated Flottans IF Karlskrona in the final to become Swedish Champions. In the following season, Hellas improved to fourth in the league and successfully defended the Swedish Championship title, winning the final against Redbergslids IK. They finished fourth in the league again in 1937–38, but lost the Stockholm final against Djurgårdens IF and did not qualify for SM. In the following season they were relegated, but were promoted again after a single season. In 1942–43, Hellas finished second in Allsvenskan, their highest league finish at that point. In 1944–45, they finished third in the league and reached the semifinals of SM, where they lost to Majornas IK. Hellas were relegated in 1946–47, but still reached the semifinals of SM, this time losing to IK Heim. Despite playing in the second level, Hellas reached the SM semifinals again in 1947–48, where they were eliminated by Redbergslid. In the following season, they were promoted back to Allsvenskan and reached the final of SM. They were defeated by cross-town rivals IFK Lidingö, who were relegated from the top division in the same season. Hellas finished third in the league in 1949–50, and reached the SM semifinals, where they were eliminated by Heim. Two years later they were relegated from the top level, but still reached the SM semifinals for a sixth time in eight seasons. They lost to cross-town rivals AIK. After this season, the SM tournament was discontinued.

Hellas did not return to the top division until 1961. In the first five seasons after their return they finished mid-table, but in 1966–67 they improved to second in the league. From the 1967–68 season, the top four in the league qualified for a playoffs to determine the Swedish Champions. In the same season, Hellas won the league but lost the final against IF Saab. In the following season, they finished second in the league and won their third Swedish title by defeating Ystads IF in the final. They finished second in the league again in 1969–70, and defended the title by winning the final against HK Drott. In 1970–71 and 1971–72, Hellas won "the double", winning the league both years and defeating Västra Frölunda IF and Drott, respectively, in the final. In 1972–73, they reached the semifinals of the European Cup, where they were eliminated by Yugoslav club Partizan Bjelovar. In both 1972–73 and 1973–74, Hellas lost the Swedish final against IF Saab. They finished seventh in the league and failed to qualify for the playoffs in 1974–75 and were eliminated by Heim in the semifinals in 1975–76. In 1976–77, Hellas won "the double" again, defeating Heim in the final. After this their performances declined and they were relegated in 1981. They were promoted again in 1985 but were relegated two years later and have yet to return to the top division. As of 2017–18, they play in Division 3, the fifth level.

== Orienteering ==
Hellas won the first Tiomila in 1945. In 1966 Jonas Ernfridsson led by a quarter of an hour after the fifth leg. Harald Tirén increased it by half an hour on the sixth leg. However, the next runner lost more than that and the club did not get any medal.
