= IFK Karlskrona =

Swedish handball club

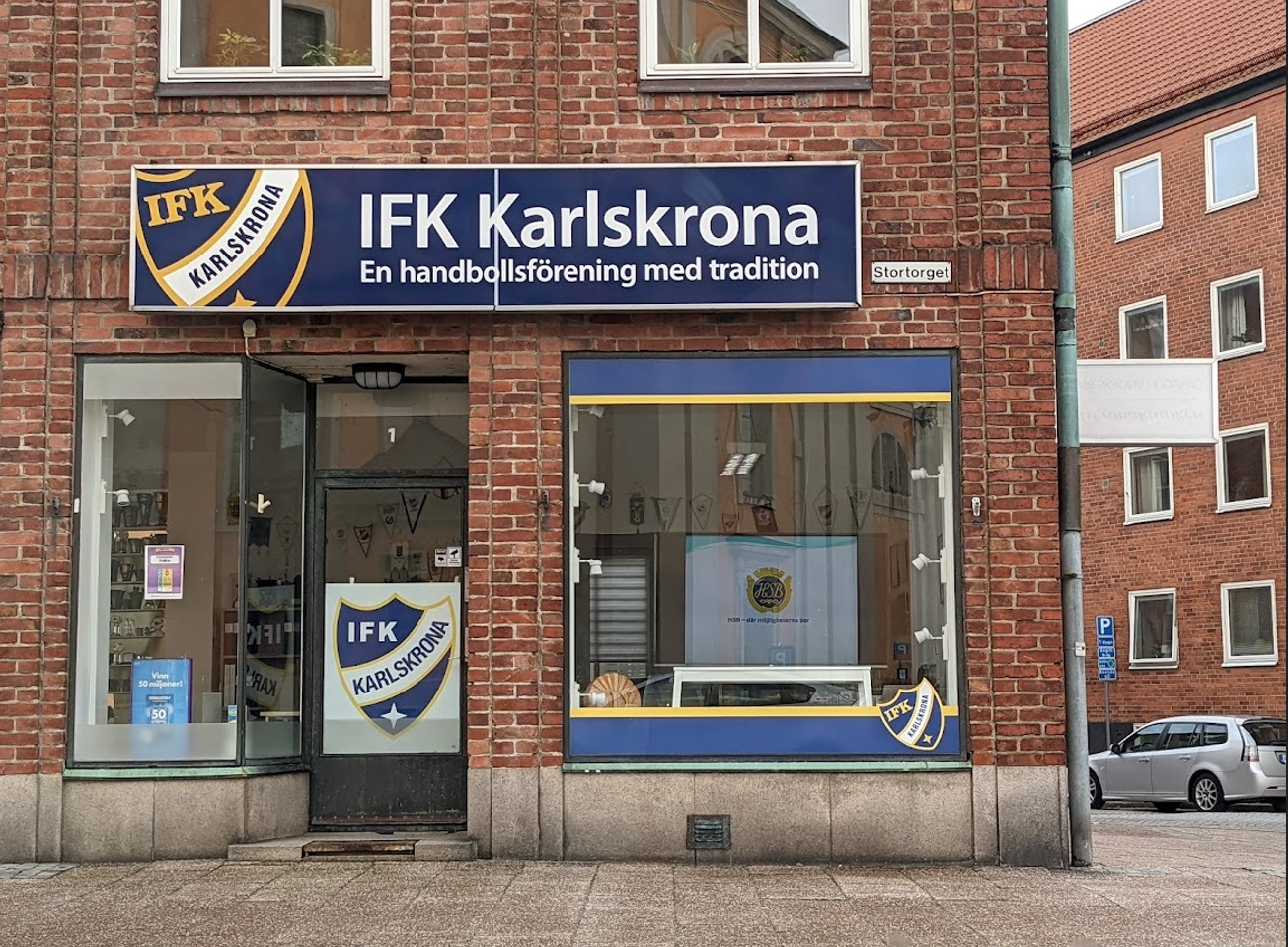
- Founded: 14 March 1921; 105 years ago
- Arena: Brinova Arena, Karlskrona
- Capacity: 2,500
- Head coach: Hans Karlsson
- League: Allsvenskan
- Club colours
Home	Away

IFK Karlskrona are a Swedish handball club based in Karlskrona. The club was founded in 1921. They won Allsvenskan in 1944–1945. They reached the final of the Swedish championship, at the time played as a straight knockout tournament, in 1940, 1944 and 1945, but were beaten each time by Majorna. They won Allsvenskan again in 1948–49, but were eliminated in the first round of the Swedish championship by Näsby IF. In 1952, the Swedish championship tournament was discontinued and the Swedish champions title was awarded to the winners of Allsvenskan. The club finished second in Allsvenskan in 1955–56; their fourth Swedish championship silver. They were relegated from Allsvenkan in 1961 and did not return until 1981. In 1983, Karlskrona reached the final of the IHF Cup, where they were defeated by Soviet club ZTR Zaporizhia. They most recently played in the top division, renamed Elitserien, in 1995. They currently play in Division 2, the fourth level.

== Kits ==
AWAY
2015–16	2017–18	2018–20

== Team ==
=== Current squad ===
Squad for the 2025–26 season

Goalkeepers
Left Wingers
Right Wingers
Line players

Left Backs
Central Backs
Right Backs

=== Transfers ===
Transfers for the 2025–26 season

Joining

Leaving

- (Chile) (Sweden) Joshua Mesias Västerlund (RB) to (Sweden) IF Hallby
