= Majornas IK =

Swedish sport club

- Full name: Majornas IK
- Short name: Majorna, MIK
- Founded: August 8, 1916; 109 years ago
- Arena: Valhalla sporthallar
- Capacity: 500
- League: Division 4
Home	Away

Majornas IK is a Swedish sport club from Gothenburg founded in 1916. The club is most famous for its handball team, who have been Swedish champions seven times (1935, 1940, 1942, 1943, 1944, 1945 and 1946). Until 1964 they had played all seasons excluding one in the top flight, but have not played there since. They currently play in Division 4, the 6th level.

When the club started, it was mainly concentrated on association football, but the football section was discontinued in 2006 because of a lack of players. In 1928, the club took part in the creation of the Gothenburg district federation for bandy.

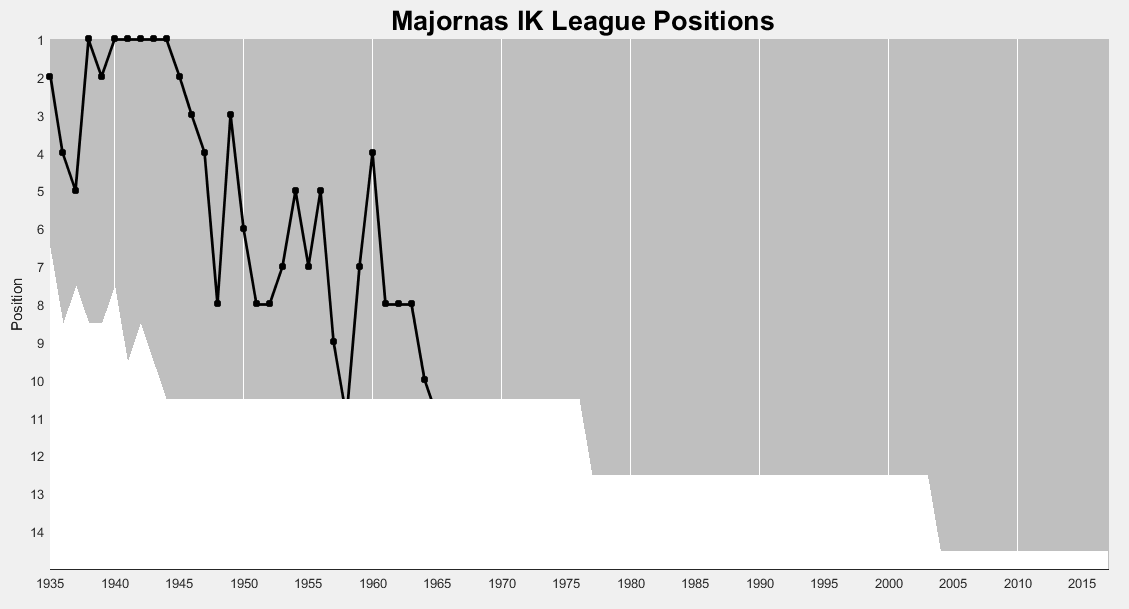
Majorna's (handball) positions in the top division
