= List of Swedish men's handball champions =

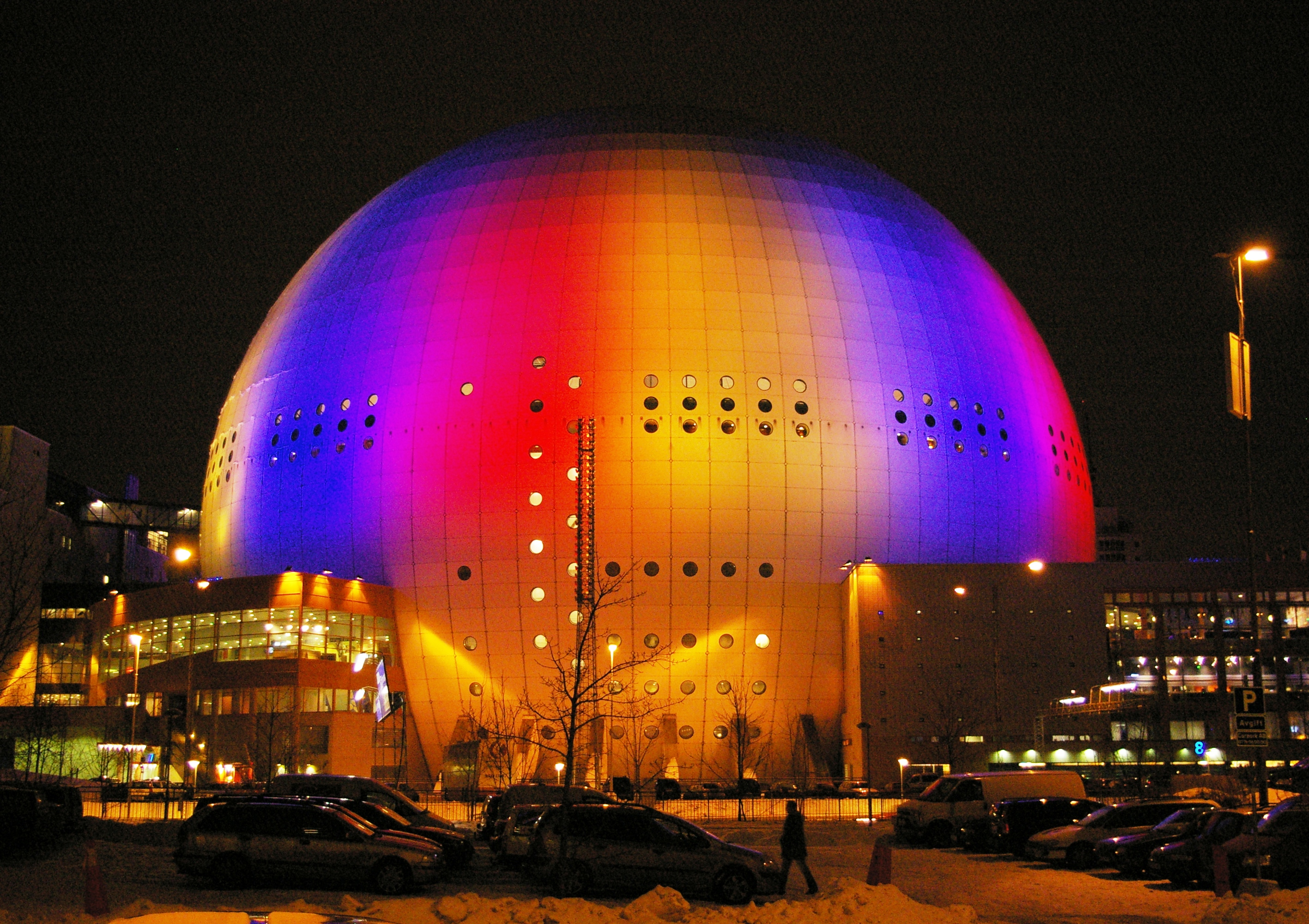
The Ericsson Globe in Stockholm hosted the final in 2005, 2007 and 2009.

The Swedish men's handball champions (Swedish: Svenska mästare i handboll för herrar) have been determined by three different competitions. From 1931–32 until 1951–52, the title was decided by a straight knockout tournament known as Svenska mästerskapet ("the Swedish Championship"). After 1934–35, it was played parallel to the highest league, Allsvenskan. The tournament was contested by the winners of the Distriktsmästerskap ("Provincial Championships") until 1945–46. After that it was contested by all teams from the top division, all Provincial Champions and invited teams from lower leagues. From 1952–53 until 1966–67, the title of Swedish Champions was awarded to the winners of Allsvenskan. Since 1967–68, the Swedish Champions have been determined by a playoffs competition between the highest-placed teams in the top league. Until 2003–04, all playoff rounds were decided by a series of home and away matches. Between 2004–05 and 2017–18 the final was played as a single match at a predetermined venue. Since 2018–19, the final is again played as a series. The league changed its name to Elitserien in 1990–91 and to Handbollsligan in 2016–17.

Redbergslid have won the most Swedish Championships with 20, followed by Drott at 11. These two clubs completely dominated Swedish men's handball from 1983–84 to 2002–03, winning all titles but one. They are followed by Kristianstad at 9 titles and four clubs at 7 titles: Heim, Hellas, Majorna and Sävehof. Majorna have won the title the most times in a row, winning it five times from 1942 to 1946. Västerås IK and AIK are the only teams to have won the championship (in its pre-1952 knockout format) while playing outside the top flight. Drott have been runners-up 12 times, more than any other team. Teams from the Gothenburg area (Redbergslid, Heim, Majorna and Sävehof) have won 41 of 91 titles. Since 1978, clubs from southern and western Götaland have won 42 of 45 titles, the other three being won by Stockholm club Hammarby. The current champions are IFK Kristianstad.

== List ==
=== Svenska mästerskapet (1931–1952) ===
Teams in bold are those who also won Allsvenskan. Teams in italics are those from outside Allsvenskan (since its formation in 1934). An asterisk (*) denotes result after extra time.

Year	Champions (number of titles)	Score	Runners-up	Venue	Attendance
1931–32	Flottans IF Karlskrona	15–9	Stockholms-Flottans IF	Skeppsholmshallen, Stockholm	1,000
1932–33	Redbergslids IK	15–11	Stockholms-Flottans IF	Mässhallen, Gothenburg	1,422
1933–34	Redbergslids IK (2)	15–9	Sollefteå GIF	Mässhallen, Gothenburg	1,115
1934–35	Majornas IK	10–9	Stockholms-Flottans IF	Skeppsholmshallen, Stockholm	1,182
1935–36	SoIK Hellas	7–5	Flottans IF Karlskrona	Karlskrona	1,288
1936–37	SoIK Hellas (2)	9–7	Redbergslids IK	Alvikshallen, Stockholm	2,101
1937–38	Västerås IK	13–12	Djurgårdens IF	Skeppsholmshallen, Stockholm	1,450
1938–39	Upsala Studenters IF	7–6	Redbergslids IK	Studenternas tennishall, Uppsala	822
1939–40	**Majornas IK** (2)	8–4	IFK Karlskrona	Mässhallen, Gothenburg	2,264
1940–41	IFK Kristianstad	17–8	IFK Uppsala	Södra kaserns gymnastiksal, Kristianstad	1,299
1941–42	**Majornas IK** (3)	16–5	Stockholms-Flottans IF	Mässhallen, Gothenburg	2,319
1942–43	**Majornas IK** (4)	14–8	Västerås HF	Mässhallen, Gothenburg	1,900
1943–44	**Majornas IK** (5)	16–8	IFK Karlskrona	Karlskrona	1,499
1944–45	Majornas IK (6)	12–10	IFK Karlskrona	Mässhallen, Gothenburg	3,254
1945–46	Majornas IK (7)	11–3	Upsala IF	Mässhallen, Gothenburg	1,990
1946–47	**Redbergslids IK** (3)	8–7	IK Heim	Mässhallen, Gothenburg	4,198
1947–48	IFK Kristianstad (2)	8–7*	Redbergslids IK	Sporthallen, Kristianstad	1,628
1948–49	IFK Lidingö	7–4	SoIK Hellas	Eriksdalshallen, Stockholm	1,403
1949–50	IK Heim	9–6	Örebro SK	Örebro	1,857
1950–51	AIK	12–11	IFK Kristianstad	Eriksdalshallen, Stockholm	1,784
1951–52	**IFK Kristianstad** (3)	16–15*	AIK	Sporthallen, Kristianstad	1,272

=== League winners (1952–1967) ===
Year	Champions (number of titles)	Runners-up
1952–53	IFK Kristianstad (4)	Redbergslids IK
1953–54	Redbergslids IK (4)	IFK Kristianstad
1954–55	IK Heim (2)	IFK Kristianstad
1955–56	Örebro SK	IFK Karlskrona
1956–57	Örebro SK (2)	IFK Malmö
1957–58	Redbergslids IK (5)	Örebro SK
1958–59	IK Heim (3)	Redbergslids IK
1959–60	IK Heim (4)	Lugi HF
1960–61	Vikingarnas IF	IK Heim
1961–62	IK Heim (5)	Vikingarnas IF
1962–63	Redbergslids IK (6)	IF Hallby
1963–64	Redbergslids IK (7)	Vikingarnas IF
1964–65	Redbergslids IK (8)	KFUM Borås
1965–66	IS Göta	H43 Lund
1966–67	Vikingarnas IF (2)	SoIK Hellas

=== Playoff winners, final series (1967–2004) ===
Teams in bold are those who also won the regular season. Until 1982–83, series results are given as wins–draws–losses.

Year	Champions (number of titles)	Matches	Runners-up
1967–68	IF Saab	1–1–0	SoIK Hellas
1968–69	SoIK Hellas (3)	2–0–0	Ystads IF HF
1969–70	SoIK Hellas (4)	1–1–0	HK Drott
1970–71	**SoIK Hellas** (5)	2–0–0	Västra Frölunda IF
1971–72	**SoIK Hellas** (6)	2–0–1	HK Drott
1972–73	**IF Saab** (2)	1–1–0	SoIK Hellas
1973–74	IF Saab (3)	2–0–1	SoIK Hellas
1974–75	HK Drott	1–1–0	IFK Kristianstad
1975–76	Ystads IF HF	2–0–1	IK Heim
1976–77	**SoIK Hellas** (7)	2–0–0	IK Heim
1977–78	HK Drott (2)	2–0–0	Lugi HF
1978–79	HK Drott (3)	1–1–0	Ystads IF HF
1979–80	Lugi HF	2–0–1	Ystads IF HF
1980–81	Vikingarnas IF (3)	2–0–1	Ystads IF HF
1981–82	IK Heim (6)	2–0–0	HK Drott
1982–83	**IK Heim** (7)	2–0–0	Västra Frölunda IF
1983–84	HK Drott (4)	3–0	Lugi HF
1984–85	**Redbergslids IK** (9)	3–2	HK Drott
1985–86	**Redbergslids IK** (10)	3–1	HP Warta
1986–87	**Redbergslids IK** (11)	3–1	HK Drott
1987–88	HK Drott (5)	3–0	Redbergslids IK
1988–89	Redbergslids IK (12)	3–0	HK Drott
1989–90	HK Drott (6)	3–1	IF Saab
1990–91	**HK Drott** (7)	3–0	Irsta HF
1991–92	**Ystads IF HF** (2)	3–0	HK Drott
1992–93	**Redbergslids IK** (13)	3–2	IK Sävehof
1993–94	**HK Drott** (8)	3–0	IK Sävehof
1994–95	Redbergslids IK (14)	3–2	HK Drott
1995–96	**Redbergslids IK** (15)	3–0	Lugi HF
1996–97	Redbergslids IK (16)	3–0	IF Guif
1997–98	**Redbergslids IK** (17)	3–1	HK Drott
1998–99	**HK Drott** (9)	3–1	Redbergslids IK
1999–2000	**Redbergslids IK** (18)	2–1	HK Drott
2000–01	**Redbergslids IK** (19)	2–1	IF Guif
2001–02	HK Drott (10)	2–0	Redbergslids IK
2002–03	**Redbergslids IK** (20)	3–0	HK Drott
2003–04	**IK Sävehof**	3–0	Redbergslids IK

=== Playoff winners, single final (2004–2018) ===
Teams in bold are those who also won the regular season. An asterisk (*) denotes result after extra time.

Year	Champions (number of titles)	Score	Runners-up	Venue	Attendance
2004–05	IK Sävehof (2)	27–26	IFK Skövde	Ericsson Globe, Stockholm	14,327
2005–06	Hammarby IF	34–31	IK Sävehof	Scandinavium, Gothenburg	12,236
2006–07	**Hammarby IF** (2)	34–22	IFK Skövde	Ericsson Globe, Stockholm	14,089
2007–08	**Hammarby IF** (3)	35–29	IK Sävehof	Scandinavium, Gothenburg	12,167
2008–09	Alingsås HK	29–26	IF Guif	Ericsson Globe, Stockholm	13,297
2009–10	**IK Sävehof** (3)	30–28*	HK Drott	Malmö Arena, Malmö	11,822
2010–11	**IK Sävehof** (4)	35–18	Eskilstuna Guif	Scandinavium, Gothenburg	10,763
2011–12	IK Sävehof (5)	29–21	IFK Kristianstad	Malmö Arena, Malmö	12,068
2012–13	HK Drott (11)	28–27	IFK Kristianstad	Scandinavium, Gothenburg	12,044
2013–14	Alingsås HK (2)	24–22	Lugi HF	Malmö Arena, Malmö	10,467
2014–15	**IFK Kristianstad** (5)	28–25	Alingsås HK	Scandinavium, Gothenburg	12,312
2015–16	**IFK Kristianstad** (6)	27–18	Alingsås HK	Malmö Arena, Malmö	11,579
2016–17	**IFK Kristianstad** (7)	31–25	Alingsås HK	Malmö Arena, Malmö	9,876
2017–18	**IFK Kristianstad** (8)	23–22*	HK Malmö	Scandinavium, Gothenburg	9,668

=== Playoff winners, final series (2018–) ===
Teams in bold are those who also won the regular season.

Year	Champions (number of titles)	Matches	Runners-up
2018–19	IK Sävehof (6)	3–2	Alingsås HK
2019–20	none (Note: The postseason was cancelled due to the coronavirus outbreak and no championship was awarded.)		
2020–21	**IK Sävehof** (7)	3–0	IFK Skövde
2021–22	Ystads IF (3)	3–1	IFK Skövde
2022–23	**IFK Kristianstad** (9)	3–2	IK Sävehof
2023–24	**IK Sävehof** (8)	3–1	Ystads IF
2024–25	**Ystads IF** (4)	3–1	Hammarby IF
2025–26	**IFK Kristianstad** (10)	3–1	HK Malmö

== Total titles won ==
Titles won by club (%)
1. Redbergslids IK - 20 (22.0%)
2. HK Drott – 11 (12.0%)
3. IFK Kristianstad - 10 (10.0%)
4. SoIK Hellas - 7 (8.00%)
5. IK Heim - 7 (8.00%)
6. Majornas IK - 7 (8.00%)
7. IK Sävehof - 8 (8.00%)
8. Other clubs (25.0%)

A total of 21 clubs have been crowned Swedish champions from Flottans IF Karlskrona in 1932 until IFK Kristianstad in 2023. A total of 94 Swedish championships have been awarded. Redbergslids IK is the most successful club with 20 Swedish Championship titles.

Teams are ranked by number of titles, then by number of times they have been runners-up, then alphabetically. Teams in bold are those who play in Handbollsligan in 2025–26.

Club	Winners	Runners-up	Years won	Years runners-up
Redbergslids IK	20	9	1933, 1934, 1947, 1954, 1958, 1963, 1964, 1965, 1985, 1986, 1987, 1989, 1993, 1995, 1996, 1997, 1998, 2000, 2001, 2003	1937, 1939, 1948, 1953, 1959, 1988, 1999, 2002, 2004
HK Drott	11	12	1975, 1978, 1979, 1984, 1988, 1990, 1991, 1994, 1999, 2002, 2013	1970, 1972, 1982, 1985, 1987, 1989, 1992, 1995, 1998, 2000, 2003, 2010
**IFK Kristianstad**	10	6	1941, 1948, 1952, 1953, 2015, 2016, 2017, 2018, 2023, 2026	1951, 1954, 1955, 1975, 2012, 2013
**IK Sävehof**	8	5	2004, 2005, 2010, 2011, 2012, 2019, 2021, 2024	1993, 1994, 2006, 2008, 2023
SoIK Hellas	7	5	1936, 1937, 1969, 1970, 1971, 1972, 1977	1949, 1967, 1968, 1973, 1974
IK Heim	7	4	1950, 1955, 1959, 1960, 1962, 1982, 1983	1947, 1961, 1976, 1977
Majornas IK	7	0	1935, 1940, 1942, 1943, 1944, 1945, 1946	—
**Ystads IF HF**	4	5	1976, 1992, 2022, 2025	1969, 1979, 1980, 1981, 2024
**OV Helsingborg HK**	3	2	1961, 1967, 1981	1962, 1964
**Hammarby IF**	3	1	2006, 2007, 2008	2025
IF Saab	3	1	1968, 1973, 1974	1990
**Alingsås HK**	2	4	2009, 2014	2015, 2016, 2017, 2019
Örebro SK	2	2	1956, 1957	1950, 1958
Lugi HF	1	5	1980	1960, 1978, 1984, 1996, 2014
AIK	1	1	1951	1952
Flottans IF Karlskrona	1	1	1932	1936
IFK Lidingö	1	0	1949	—
IS Göta	1	0	1966	—
Upsala Studenters IF	1	0	1939	—
Västerås IK	1	0	1938	—
**Eskilstuna Guif**	0	4	—	1997, 2001, 2009, 2011
IFK Karlskrona	0	4	—	1940, 1944, 1945, 1956
**IFK Skövde**	0	4	—	2005, 2007, 2021, 2022
Stockholms-Flottans IF	0	4	—	1932, 1933, 1935, 1942
**HK Malmö**	0	2	—	2018, 2026
Västra Frölunda IF	0	2	—	1971, 1983
Djurgårdens IF	0	1	—	1938
H43 Lund	0	1	—	1966
HP Warta	0	1	—	1986
**IF Hallby**	0	1	—	1963
IFK Malmö	0	1	—	1957
IFK Uppsala	0	1	—	1941
Irsta HF	0	1	—	1991
KFUM Borås	0	1	—	1965
Sollefteå GIF	0	1	—	1934
Upsala IF	0	1	—	1946
Västerås HF	0	1	—	1943

== See also ==
- Handbollsligan
