= 1934–35 Svenska mästerskapet (men's handball) =

Swedish men's handball tournament

Svenska mästerskapet
- 1934–35

Tournament information
- Sport: Handball
- Teams: 17

Final positions
- Champions: Majornas IK (1st title)
- Runner-up: Stockholms-Flottans IF

The 1934–35 Svenska mästerskapet was the fourth staging of the Svenska mästerskapet, a tournament held to determine the Swedish Champions of men's handball. Teams qualified by winning their respective District Championships. 17 teams competed in the tournament. Redbergslids IK were the defending champions, but failed to qualify by losing to Göteborgs IK in the District Championship of Gothenburg. Majornas IK won the title, defeating Stockholms-Flottans IF in the final. The final was played on 30 March in Skeppsholmshallen in Stockholm, and was watched by 1,182 spectators.

== Results ==
=== First round ===
- Brynäs IF–IF Gute 23–8

=== Second round ===
- Brynäs IF–Upsala Studenters IF 14–17
- I 10 Strängnäs–Norrköpings AIS 14–12

=== Third round ===
- IF Castor–Sollefteå GIF 9–4
- Upsala Studenters IF–Stockholms-Flottans IF 6–13
- I 10 Strängnäs–IFK Örebro 14–27
- Majornas IK–IF Göta 26–3
- IFK Uddevalla–IFK Skövde 13–12 a.e.t.
- Flottans IF Karlskrona–IFK Kristianstad 24–11

=== Quarterfinals ===
- IF Castor–Umeå IK w/o
- Stockholms-Flottans IF–IFK Örebro 14–8
- Majornas IK–IFK Uddevalla 21–6
- Flottans IF Karlskrona–GoIF Fram 16–8

=== Semifinals ===
- IF Castor–Stockholms-Flottans IF 3–11
- Majornas IK–Flottans IF Karlskrona 18–10

=== Final ===
- Stockholms-Flottans IF–Majornas IK 9–10

== Champions ==
The following players for Majornas IK received a winner's medal: Jarl Nyberg, Åke Forslund (1 goal in the final), Henry Apelgren, Eskil Gustafsson, Agne Blomgren (1), Åke Gustafsson (1), Lars Baltzer (2), Stig Hjortsberg (5) and Arne Holmqvist.

== See also ==
1934–35 Allsvenskan (men's handball)
