= 1936–37 Svenska mästerskapet (men's handball) =

6th season to determine the Swedish Champions of men's handball

Svenska mästerskapet
- 1936–37

Tournament information
- Sport: Handball
- Teams: 17

Final positions
- Champions: SoIK Hellas (2nd title)
- Runner-up: Redbergslids IK

The 1936–37 Svenska mästerskapet was the sixth season of Svenska mästerskapet, a tournament held to determine the Swedish Champions of men's handball. Teams qualified by winning their respective District Championships. 17 teams competed in the tournament. SoIK Hellas were the defending champions, and won their second title, defeating Redbergslids IK in the final. The final was played on 4 April in Alvikshallen in Stockholm, and was watched by 2,101 spectators.

== Results ==
=== First round ===
- Västerås IK–IFK Eskilstuna 18–8
- KFUM Örebro–I 4 Linköping w/o
- IF Göta–IF Elfsborg 10–15
- Redbergslids IK–IFK Uddevalla 23–11

=== Second round ===
- IF Gute–Upsala Studenters IF w/o
- Gefle IF–SoIK Hellas 9–13
- Västerås IK–KFUM Örebro 26–8
- IF Elfsborg–Redbergslids IK 7–18
- Flottans IF Karlskrona–Malmö BI 12–6
- Halmstads BK–IF Hallby w.o.

=== Quarterfinals ===
- Upsala Studenters IF–SoIK Hellas 8–9
- Västerås IK–Redbergslids IK 9–22
- Flottans IF Karlskrona–IF Hallby 26–8

=== Semifinals ===
- Sollefteå GIF–SoIK Hellas w/o
- Redbergslids IK–Flottans IF Karlskrona 15–5

=== Final ===
- SoIK Hellas–Redbergslids IK 9–7

== Champions ==
The following players for SoIK Hellas received a winner's medal: Arne Karlsson, Sven Johansson, Sture Johansson, Bertil Särneman, Bo Bäckström, Arne Leckström, Åke Fröander, Jan Hellstadius and Mats Hellstadius.

== See also ==
1936–37 Allsvenskan (men's handball)
