= 1939–40 Svenska mästerskapet (men's handball) =

Swedish handball tournament

Svenska mästerskapet
- 1939–40

Tournament information
- Sport: Handball
- Teams: 15

Final positions
- Champions: Majornas IK (2nd title)
- Runner-up: IFK Karlskrona

The 1939–40 Svenska mästerskapet was the ninth season of Svenska mästerskapet, a tournament held to determine the Swedish Champions of men's handball. Teams qualified by winning their respective District Championships. 15 teams competed in the tournament. Upsala Studenters IF were the defending champions, but failed to win the District Championship of Uppland and did not qualify. Majornas IK won their second title, defeating IFK Karlskrona in the final. The final was originally to be played on 15 April, but was rescheduled two days before that date due to fear for bombing. The final was eventually played on 20 October in Mässhallen in Gothenburg, and was watched by 2,264 spectators.

== Results ==
=== First Round ===
- Djurgårdens IF–Upsala IF 4–5
- Gävle GIK–I 18 Visby w/o
- IF Göta–IFK Karlsborg 11–5
- Norrköpings AIS–IK City 10–5
- KFUM Örebro–Västerås IK 10–9
- IK Tord–Halmstads BK 8–7
- IFK Karlskrona–Ystads IF HF w/o

=== Quarterfinals ===
- Upsala IF–Gävle GIK 5–4
- IF Göta–Majornas IK 8–22
- Norrköpings AIS–KFUM Örebro 11–9
- IK Tord–IFK Karlskrona 3–27

=== Semifinals ===
- Upsala IF–Majornas IK 7–12
- Norrköpings AIS–IFK Karlskrona 4–19

=== Final ===
- Majornas IK–IFK Karlskrona 8–4

== Champions ==
The following players for Majornas IK received a winner's medal: Jarl Nyberg, Sven-Eric Forsell, Gösta Swerin, Åker Forslund, Stig Hjortsberg, Åke Gustafsson, Gustav-Adolf Thorén, Lars Lindstrand, Torsten Henriksson and Bertil Pihl.

== See also ==
1939–40 Allsvenskan (men's handball)
