= 1937–38 Svenska mästerskapet (men's handball) =

Swedish handball tournament

Svenska mästerskapet
- 1937–38

Tournament information
- Sport: Handball
- Teams: 19

Final positions
- Champions: Västerås IK (1st title)
- Runner-up: Djurgårdens IF

The 1937–38 Svenska mästerskapet was the seventh season of Svenska mästerskapet, a tournament held to determine the Swedish Champions of men's handball. Teams qualified by winning their respective District Championships. 19 teams competed in the tournament. SoIK Hellas were the defending champions, but failed to qualify after losing the District Championship final of Stockholm to Djurgårdens IF. Västerås IK won the title, defeating Djurgårdens IF in the final. Västerås IK became the first team from outside Allsvenskan to win the Swedish Championship since the start of league handball in Sweden. The final was played on 10 April in Skeppsholmshallen in Stockholm, and was watched by 1,450 spectators. The final was the first handball match in Sweden to be broadcast on radio.

== Results ==
=== First round ===
- IFK Uddevalla–GF Frithiof 14–13 a.e.t.
- Majornas IK–IF Göta 24–13
- Halmstads BK–IFK Kristianstad 4–26
- Flottans IF Karlskrona–GoIF Fram 14–5

=== Second round ===
- Bodens BK–Umeå läroverk 18–22
- Visby IF–Gefle Sport 11–14
- Djurgårdens IF–Upsala IF 22–9
- IFK Eskilstuna–Västerås IK 12–16
- BK Derby–KFUM Örebro 8–10
- IFK Uddevalla–Majornas IK 11–19
- IFK Kristianstad–Flottans IF Karlskrona 5–7

=== Third round ===
- IFK Östersund–Umeå läroverk 7–6
- Gefle Sport–Djurgårdens IF 8–15
- Västerås IK–KFUM Örebro 14–13
- Majornas IK–Flottans IF Karlskrona 7–8

=== Semifinals ===
- IFK Östersund–Djurgårdens IF w/o
- Västerås IK–Flottans IF Karlskrona 9–8

=== Final ===
- Djurgårdens IF–Västerås IK 12–13

== Champions ==
The following players for Västerås IK received a winner's medal: Åke Andersson, Gunnar Persson (1 goal in the final), Nils Riddarström, Knut Helin, Erik Pettersson, John Petterson (4), Arne Ericsson (1), Sven Helin (3), Arne Andersson.

== See also ==
1937–38 Allsvenskan (men's handball)
