= 1993–94 Elitserien (men's handball) =

Swedish handball season

Elitserien
- 1993–94

Tournament information
- Sport: Handball
- Teams: 12

Final positions
- Champions: HK Drott (8th title)
- Runner-up: IK Sävehof

The 1993–94 Elitserien was the 60th season of the top division of Swedish handball. 12 teams competed in the league. The league was split into an autumn league and a spring league. The eight highest placed teams in the autumn league qualified for the spring league. HK Drott won the regular season and also won the playoffs to claim their 8th Swedish title.

== League tables ==
=== Autumn ===
Pos	Team	Pld	W	D	L	GF	GA	GD	Pts
1	HK Drott	16	15	1	0	427	324	103	31
2	IK Sävehof	16	12	2	2	365	319	46	26
3	IF Saab	16	9	1	6	362	352	10	19
4	IFK Skövde	16	9	0	7	363	359	4	18
5	Irsta HF	16	8	2	6	351	355	−4	18
6	Lugi HF	16	8	1	7	382	357	25	17
7	Redbergslids IK	16	7	1	8	335	330	5	15
8	IF Guif	16	6	2	8	351	370	−19	14
9	Växjö HF	16	5	2	9	376	400	−24	12
10	IFK Kristianstad	16	5	0	11	368	396	−28	10
11	BK Söder	16	3	1	12	340	411	−71	7
12	Ystads IF	16	2	1	13	324	371	−47	5

=== Spring ===
Pos	Team	Pld	W	D	L	GF	GA	GD	Pts
1	HK Drott	30	26	3	1	797	623	174	55
2	IK Sävehof	30	17	5	8	655	605	50	39
3	Redbergslids IK	30	18	2	10	657	614	43	38
4	Lugi HF	30	13	4	13	719	685	34	30
5	IF Saab	30	13	4	13	658	671	−13	30
6	IFK Skövde	30	14	1	15	675	683	−8	29
7	Irsta HF	30	12	5	13	644	690	−46	29
8	IF Guif	30	8	4	18	659	723	−64	20

== Playoffs ==
=== Quarterfinals ===
- Redbergslids IK–IF Saab 25–23
- IF Saab–Redbergslids IK 24–21
- Redbergslids IK–IF Saab 21–16

Redbergslids IK won series 2–1

- Lugi HF–IFK Skövde 25–16
- IFK Skövde–Lugi HF 24–23
- Lugi HF–IFK Skövde 23–18

Lugi HF won series 2–1

=== Semifinals ===
- HK Drott–Lugi HF 24–14
- Lugi HF–HK Drott 12–30

HK Drott won series 2–0

- IK Sävehof–Redbergslids IK 23–21
- Redbergslids IK–IK Sävehof 21–17
- IK Sävehof–Redbergslids IK 15–14

IK Sävehof won series 2–1

=== Finals ===
- HK Drott–IK Sävehof 18–17
- IK Sävehof–HK Drott 17–22
- HK Drott–IK Sävehof 23–16

HK Drott won series 3–0
