= 1932–33 Svenska mästerskapet (men's handball) =

2nd season of Swedish men's handball tournament

Svenska mästerskapet
- 1932–33

Tournament information
- Sport: Handball
- Teams: 15

Final positions
- Champions: Redbergslids IK (1st title)
- Runner-up: Stockholms-Flottans IF

The 1932–33 Svenska mästerskapet was the second season of Svenska mästerskapet, a tournament held to determine the Swedish Champions of men's handball. Teams qualified by winning their respective District Championships. 15 teams competed in the tournament. The first round was held in four geographical groups, with the winners qualifying for the semifinals. Flottans IF Karlskrona were the defending champions, but were eliminated by Redbergslids IK in the semifinals. Redbergslids IK won the title, defeating Stockholms-Flottans IF in the final. The final was played on 25 March in Mässhallen in Gothenburg, and was watched by 1,422 spectators.

== Results ==
=== First round ===
Northern:

- Sollefteå GIF–Bodens BK 15–10
- IFK Östersund–Bodens BK 15–12
- Sollefteå GIF–IFK Östersund 8–8

Winner: Sollefteå GIF

Eastern:

- Strängnäs–Västerås IK 20–8
- IFK Örebro–Norrköpings AIS 18–2
- IFK Örebro–Norrköpings AIS 21–12
- Stockholms-Flottans IF–IFK Örebro 18–9

Winner: Stockholms-Flottans IF

Western:

- IFK Uddevalla–IS Halmia 11–9
- Redbergslids IK–IFK Skövde 20–11
- Redbergslids IK–IFK Uddevalla 34–2

Winner: Redbergslids IK

Southern:

- Flottans IF Karlskrona–IFK Kristianstad 31–12
- Flottans IF Karlskrona–GoIF Fram 15–6

Winner: Flottans IF Karlskrona

=== Semifinals ===
- Stockholms-Flottans IF–Sollefteå GIF 15–9
- Redbergslids IK–Flottans IF Karlskrona 12–11

=== Final ===
- Redbergslids IK–Stockholms-Flottans IF 15–11

== Champions ==
International footballer Sven Rydell was a member of the winning team. The following players for Redbergslids IK received a winner's medal: K.G Andersson, "Daggy" Karlsson, Bengt Åberg, Torsten Andersson, Ingvald Carlsson, Tage Sjöberg, Sven Rydell, Sven Åblad and Arne Kinell.
