= 1992–93 Elitserien (men's handball) =

Swedish handball season

Elitserien
- 1992–93

Tournament information
- Sport: Handball
- Teams: 12

Final positions
- Champions: Redbergslids IK (13th title)
- Runner-up: IK Sävehof

The 1992–93 Elitserien was the 59th season of the top division of Swedish handball. 12 teams competed in the league. The league was split into an autumn league and a spring league. The eight highest placed teams in the autumn league qualified for the spring league. Redbergslids IK won the regular season and also won the playoffs to claim their 13th Swedish title.

== League tables ==
=== Autumn ===
Pos	Team	Pld	W	D	L	GF	GA	GD	Pts
1	Redbergslids IK	16	11	3	2	367	310	57	25
2	Ystads IF	16	10	0	6	400	334	66	20
3	IK Sävehof	16	9	2	5	338	318	20	20
4	IF Saab	16	9	1	6	349	326	23	19
5	IFK Skövde	16	8	3	5	339	334	5	19
6	HK Drott	16	8	0	8	362	337	25	16
7	IF Guif	16	7	1	8	348	349	−1	15
8	Irsta HF	16	7	1	8	347	354	−7	15
9	BK Söder	16	6	2	8	333	352	−19	14
10	IFK Kristianstad	16	5	0	11	334	393	−59	10
11	IFK Karlskrona	16	3	4	9	301	368	−67	10
12	Växjö HF	16	4	1	11	312	355	−43	9

=== Spring ===
Pos	Team	Pld	W	D	L	GF	GA	GD	Pts
1	Redbergslids IK	30	21	3	6	687	597	90	45
2	IK Sävehof	30	17	5	8	628	585	43	39
3	Ystads IF	30	17	1	12	727	645	82	35
4	HK Drott	30	16	2	12	686	641	45	34
5	IFK Skövde	30	15	3	12	630	613	17	33
6	IF Saab	30	14	1	15	647	629	18	29
7	IF Guif	30	11	2	17	633	683	−50	24
8	Irsta HF	30	10	2	18	647	704	−57	22

== Playoffs ==
=== Quarterfinals ===
- Ystads IF–IFK Skövde 19–13, 27–25 (Ystads IF won series 2–0)
- HK Drott–IF Saab 23–18, 27–19 (HK Drott won series 2–0)

=== Semifinals ===
- Redbergslids IK–HK Drott 20–19, 21–25, 21–17 (Redbergslids IK won series 2–1)
- IK Sävehof–Ystads IF 27–15, 31–20 (IK Sävehof won series 2–0)

=== Finals ===
- Redbergslids IK–IK Sävehof 21–21, 23–19, 19–23, 15–20, 21–16 (Redbergslids IK won series 3–2)
