= 1965–66 Allsvenskan (men's handball) =

Swedish handball season

Allsvenskan
- 1965–66

Tournament information
- Sport: Handball
- Teams: 10

Final positions
- Champions: IS Göta (1st title)
- Runner-up: H 43 Lund

The 1965–66 Allsvenskan was the 32nd season of the top division of Swedish handball. 10 teams competed in the league. IS Göta won the league and claimed their first Swedish title. KFUM Borås and IF Hallby were relegated.

== League table ==
Pos	Team	Pld	W	D	L	GF	GA	GD	Pts
1	IS Göta	18	12	1	5	398	352	46	25
2	H 43 Lund	18	10	1	7	372	350	22	21
3	Vikingarnas IF	18	10	0	8	403	367	36	20
4	IF Saab	18	8	4	6	309	295	14	20
5	IK Tord	18	8	3	7	297	318	−21	19
6	Redbergslids IK	18	8	2	8	346	360	−14	18
7	IF Guif	18	8	1	9	378	387	−9	17
8	SoIK Hellas	18	6	3	9	340	362	−22	15
9	KFUM Borås	18	7	0	11	386	402	−16	14
10	IF Hallby	18	4	3	11	336	372	−36	11
