= 1991–92 Elitserien (men's handball) =

Swedish handball season

Elitserien
- 1991–92

Tournament information
- Sport: Handball
- Teams: 12

Final positions
- Champions: Ystads IF (2nd title)
- Runner-up: HK Drott

The 1991–92 Elitserien was the 58th season of the top division of Swedish handball. 12 teams competed in the league. The league was split into an autumn league and a spring league. The eight highest placed teams in the autumn league qualified for the spring league. Ystads IF won the regular season and also won the playoffs to claim their second Swedish title.

== League tables ==
=== Autumn ===
Pos	Team	Pld	W	D	L	GF	GA	GD	Pts
1	Ystads IF	16	12	2	2	380	302	78	26
2	IF Saab	16	9	2	5	357	324	33	20
3	HK Drott	16	10	0	6	367	355	12	20
4	IFK Karlskrona	16	9	1	6	303	311	−8	19
5	IFK Skövde	16	8	2	6	349	328	21	18
6	IK Sävehof	16	8	1	7	361	332	29	17
7	BK Söder	16	7	2	7	345	373	−28	16
8	Redbergslids IK	16	6	3	7	326	329	−3	15
9	Växjö HF	16	7	1	8	343	356	−13	15
10	Irsta HF	16	5	3	8	346	354	−8	13
11	Lugi HF	16	5	0	11	319	346	−27	10
12	Ludvika HF	16	1	1	14	289	375	−86	3

=== Spring ===
Pos	Team	Pld	W	D	L	GF	GA	GD	Pts
1	Ystads IF	30	19	2	9	686	606	80	40
2	IFK Skövde	30	17	3	10	656	622	34	37
3	IK Sävehof	30	16	2	12	670	613	57	34
4	IF Saab	30	15	4	11	684	644	40	34
5	HK Drott	30	16	2	12	697	669	28	34
6	Redbergslids IK	30	13	5	12	626	619	7	31
7	IFK Karlskrona	30	12	3	15	571	618	−47	27
8	BK Söder	30	11	4	15	642	707	−65	26

== Playoffs ==
=== Quarterfinals ===
- IF Saab–Redbergslids IK 24–19, 15–20, 19–17 (IF Saab won series 2–1)
- IK Sävehof–HK Drott 21–24, 21–22 (HK Drott won series 2–0)

=== Semifinals ===
- Ystads IF–IF Saab 32–18, 17–19, 23–12 (Ystads IF won series 2–1)
- IFK Skövde–HK Drott 25–21, 14–21, 21–24 (HK Drott won series 2–1)

=== Finals ===
- Ystads IF–HK Drott 25–19, 24–16, 24–18 (Ystads IF won series 3–0)
