= 1934–35 Allsvenskan (men's handball) =

Swedish handball season

Allsvenskan
- 1934–35

Tournament information
- Sport: Handball
- Teams: 6

Final positions
- Champions: Redbergslids IK

The 1935–36 Allsvenskan was the inaugural season of national league handball in Sweden. Six teams competed in the league. Redbergslids IK won the league, but the title of Swedish Champions was awarded to the winner of Svenska mästerskapet. No team was relegated.

== League table ==
Pos	Team	Pld	W	D	L	GF	GA	GD	Pts
1	Redbergslids IK	5	5	0	0	58	43	15	10
2	Majornas IK	5	4	0	1	77	61	16	8
3	Stockholms-Flottans IF	5	2	0	3	60	62	−2	4
4	Karlskrona BK	5	2	0	3	68	72	−4	4
5	SoIK Hellas	5	1	0	4	65	75	−10	2
6	Flottans IF Karlskrona	5	1	0	4	68	83	−15	2
