= 1938–39 Svenska mästerskapet (men's handball) =

Eighth season of the Swedish men's handball tournament

Svenska mästerskapet
- 1938–39

Tournament information
- Sport: Handball
- Teams: 19

Final positions
- Champions: Upsala Studenters IF (1st title)
- Runner-up: Redbergslids IK

The 1938–39 Svenska mästerskapet was the eighth season of Svenska mästerskapet, a tournament held to determine the Swedish Champions of men's handball. Teams qualified by winning their respective District Championships. 19 teams competed in the tournament. Västerås IK were the defending champions, but failed to qualify after being eliminated from the District Championship of Västmanland by KFUM Köping. Upsala Studenters IF won the title, defeating Redbergslids IK in the final. The final was played on 2 April in Studenternas tennishall in Uppsala, and was watched by 822 spectators.

== Results ==
=== First round ===
- Sandvikens IF–Stockholms-Flottans IF 8–5
- Visby AIK–Upsala Studenters IF w/o
- GoIF Fram–IFK Karlskrona 15–11
- IS Halmia–Ystads IF HF 6–12

=== Second round ===
- Bodens BK–Umeå IK 13–24
- Sandvikens IF–Upsala Studenters IF 11–14
- GoIF Fram–Ystads IF HF 6–8
- Örebro SK–KFUM Köping 10–9
- GUIF–Norrköpings AIS 19–7
- Skövde AIK–IF Göta 19–3
- IFK Uddevalla–Redbergslids IK 5–24

=== Quarterfinals ===
- Umeå IK–IFK Östersund w/o
- Upsala Studenters IF–Ystads IF HF 13–6
- Örebro SK–GUIF 7–11
- Skövde AIK–Redbergslids IK 5–16

=== Semifinals ===
- Umeå IK–Upsala Studenters IF 7–12
- GUIF–Redbergslids IK 9–19

=== Final ===
- Upsala Studenters IF–Redbergslids IK 7–6

== Champions ==
The following players for Upsala Studenters IF received a winner's medal: Torsten Petré, Anders Vanäs, Arne Södergren, Anders Kastenholm, Bror Sanner, Bertil Lundin (1 goal in the final), Åker Persson (2), Herbert Lundin and Hans Norgren (4).

== See also ==
1938–39 Allsvenskan (men's handball)
