= 1933–34 Svenska mästerskapet (men's handball) =

Swedish handball tournament

Svenska mästerskapet
- 1933–34

Tournament information
- Sport: Handball
- Teams: 18

Final positions
- Champions: Redbergslids IK (2nd title)
- Runner-up: Sollefteå GIF

The 1933–34 Svenska mästerskapet was the third season of Svenska mästerskapet, a tournament held to determine the Swedish Champions of men's handball. Teams qualified by winning their respective District Championships. 18 teams competed in the tournament. Redbergslids IK were the defending champions, and won their second title, defeating Sollefteå GIF in the final. The final was played on 27 March in Mässhallen in Gothenburg, and was watched by 1,115 spectators.

== Results ==
=== First round ===
- Gute–IK Göta 7–24.
- Västerås IK–I 10 IF 18–17.
- IFK Örebro–Linköpings seminarie 25–9

=== Second round ===
- GF Kroppskultur–IS Halmia w/o
- Redbergslids IK–IFK Karlsborg 26–12
- Flottans IF Karlskrona–Ystad IF 20–8
- Bodens BK–Umeå IK 15–14
- Sollefteå GIF–IFK Östersund 10–7
- IK Göta–Upsala Studenters IF 20–12
- IFK Örebro–Västerås IK 25–18

=== Third round ===
- Redbergslids IK–GF Kroppskultur w/o
- Flottans IF Karlskrona–IK Tord 20–3
- Sollefteå GIF–Bodens BK 18–9
- IFK Örebro–IK Göta 9–8 a.e.t.

=== Semifinals ===
- Flottans IF Karlskrona–Redbergslid 10–11
- Sollefteå GIF–IFK Örebro 10–9

=== Final ===
Redbergslids IK–Sollefteå GIF 15–9

== Champions ==
The following players for Redbergslids IK received a winner's medal: Karl Gustav Andersson, Arne Kinell, Bengt Åberg, Torsten Andersson (4 goals in the final), Ingvald Carlsson (2), Donald Andersson (4), Sven Åblad (4), Eric Carlsson and Björkdahl (1).
