= 1931–32 Svenska mästerskapet (men's handball) =

Swedish handball tournament

Svenska mästerskapet
- 1931–32

Tournament information
- Sport: Handball
- Dates: 19 March–29 March 1932
- Teams: 6

Final positions
- Champions: Flottans IF Karlskrona (1st title)
- Runner-up: Stockholms-Flottans IF

The 1931–32 Svenska mästerskapet was the first season of Svenska mästerskapet, a tournament held to determine the Swedish Champions of men's handball. Teams qualified by winning their respective District Championships. The District Champions of Scania, Blekinge, Gothenburg, Västergötland, Stockholm and Ångermanland competed in the tournament. The first two rounds were played in Karlskrona and Sollefteå, with Stockholm being predetermined as the venue for the final. Flottans IF Karlskrona won the title, defeating Stockholms-Flottans IF in the final. The final was played on 29 March in Skeppsholmshallen in Stockholm, and was watched by about 1,000 spectators.

== Results ==
=== First Round ===
- Flottans IF Karlskrona–Ystads GK 12–7
- Stockholms-Flottans IF–Skövde IF 21–9

=== Second Round ===
- Flottans IF Karlskrona–A2 IF 9–7
- Sollefteå GIF–Stockholms-Flottans IF 7–23

=== Final ===
- Stockholms-Flottans IF–Flottans IF Karlskrona 9–15

== Champions ==
The following players for Flottans IF Karlskrona received winner's medals: Chronzell, Beckman, Fredriksson, Albin Persson (6 goals in the final), Holger Larsson (4), Eve Linder, Malte Hagberg (3), Hasselberg (1) and Waerme (1).
