= 1941–42 Svenska mästerskapet (men's handball) =

Swedish handball tournament

Svenska mästerskapet
- 1941–42

Tournament information
- Sport: Handball
- Teams: 19

Final positions
- Champions: Majornas IK (3rd title)
- Runner-up: Stockholms-Flottans IF

The 1941–42 Svenska mästerskapet was the 11th season of Svenska mästerskapet, a tournament held to determine the Swedish Champions of men's handball. Teams qualified by winning their respective District Championships. 19 teams competed in the tournament. IFK Kristianstad were the defending champions, but were eliminated by IFK Karlskrona in the quarterfinals. Majornas IK won their third title, defeating Stockholms-Flottans IF in the final. The final was played on 12 April in Mässhallen in Gothenburg, and was watched by 2,319 spectators.

== Results ==
=== First round ===
- GUIF–Trängen, Linköping 13–9
- KFUM Örebro–Västerås IK 10–11 a.e.t.
- Upsala IF–Gävle GIK 10–4
- Stockholms-Flottans IF–A 7 Visby w/o

=== Second round ===
- IFK Kristianstad–IF Leikin w/o
- Växjö BK–IFK Karlskrona 7–13
- GF Frithiof–Majornas IK 5–23
- IFK Uddevalla–Karlstads BIK 11–15
- GUIF–Västerås IK 3–10
- Upsala IF–Stockholms-Flottans IF 7–8
- IFK Umeå–A 10 Sundsvall 20–8

=== Quarterfinals ===
- IFK Kristianstad–IFK Karlskrona 5–23
- Majornas IK–Karlstads BIK 21–10
- Västerås IK–Stockholms-Flottans IF 9–10
- IFK Umeå–F 4 Östersund 21–14

=== Semifinals ===
- IFK Karlskrona–Majornas IK 12–13
- Stockholms-Flottans IF–IFK Umeå 15–8

=== Final ===
- Majornas IK–Stockholms-Flottans IF 16–5

== Champions ==
The following players for Majornas IK received a winner's medal: Bertil Huss, Stig Neptun (1 goal in the final), Claes Hedenskog, Stig Hjortsberg (2), Åke Gustafsson (6), Gustav-Adolf Thorén (3), Bertil Pihl, Torsten Henriksson (1) and Gunnar Lindgren (3).

== See also ==
1941–42 Allsvenskan (men's handball)
