= 1968–69 Allsvenskan (men's handball) =

Swedish handball season

Allsvenskan
- 1968–69

Tournament information
- Sport: Handball
- Teams: 10

Final positions
- Champions: SoIK Hellas (3rd title)
- Runner-up: Ystads IF

The 1968–69 Allsvenskan was the 35th season of the top division of Swedish handball. 10 teams competed in the league. HK Drott won the regular season, but SoIK Hellas won the playoffs and claimed their third Swedish title. UoIF Matteuspojkarna and Vikingarnas IF were relegated.

== League table ==
Pos	Team	Pld	W	D	L	GF	GA	GD	Pts
1	HK Drott	18	13	0	5	340	338	2	26
2	SoIK Hellas	18	12	1	5	371	300	71	25
3	Redbergslids IK	18	11	2	5	359	318	41	24
4	Ystads IF	18	11	1	6	368	342	26	23
5	IF Saab	18	11	0	7	353	316	37	22
6	IS Göta	18	7	1	10	373	397	−24	15
7	H 43 Lund	18	6	2	10	348	383	−35	14
8	IF Guif	18	4	3	11	343	371	−28	11
9	UoIF Matteuspojkarna	18	5	1	12	349	398	−49	11
10	Vikingarnas IF	18	3	3	12	310	351	−41	9

== Playoffs ==
=== Semifinals ===
- SoIK Hellas–Redbergslids IK 23–17, 25–17 (SoIK Hellas advance to the finals)
- Ystads IF–HK Drott 18–14, 15–16 (Ystads IF advance to the finals)

=== Finals ===
- SoIK Hellas–Ystads IF 26–16, 21–18 (SoIK Hellas champions)
