= 1989–90 Allsvenskan (men's handball) =

56th season of the top division of Swedish handball

Allsvenskan
- 1989–90

Tournament information
- Sport: Handball
- Teams: 12

Final positions
- Champions: HK Drott (6th title)
- Runner-up: IF Saab

The 1989–90 Allsvenskan was the 56th season of the top division of Swedish handball. 12 teams competed in the league. Redbergslids IK won the regular season but HK Drott won the playoffs and claimed their sixth Swedish title. Vikingarnas IF, Katrineholms AIK and HK Cliff were relegated.

== League table ==
Pos	Team	Pld	W	D	L	GF	GA	GD	Pts
1	Redbergslids IK	22	18	2	2	551	431	120	38
2	HK Drott	22	16	4	2	513	419	94	36
3	IF Saab	22	15	1	6	513	479	34	31
4	Irsta HF	22	11	3	8	473	452	21	25
5	IF Guif	22	11	3	8	410	392	18	25
6	Ystads IF	22	10	1	11	473	476	−4	21
7	LUGI	22	7	6	9	470	471	−1	20
8	IK Sävehof	22	8	3	11	478	490	−12	19
9	HP Warta	22	7	1	14	449	490	−41	15
10	Vikingarnas IF	22	6	1	15	436	486	−50	13
11	Katrineholms AIK	22	4	3	15	420	492	−72	11
12	HK Cliff	22	4	2	16	407	514	−107	10

== Playoffs ==
=== Semifinals ===
- IF Saab–Redbergslids IK 29–26, 22–18 (IF Saab won series 2–0)
- HK Drott–Irsta HF 27–23, 24–23 (HK Drott won series 2–0)

=== Finals ===
- HK Drott–IF Saab 20–25, 22–16, 20–15, 25–16 (HK Drott won series 3-1)
