= 2003–04 Elitserien (men's handball) =

Swedish handball season

Elitserien
- 2003–04

Tournament information
- Sport: Handball
- Teams: 14

Final positions
- Champions: IK Sävehof (1st title)
- Runner-up: Redbergslids IK

The 2003–04 Elitserien was the 70th season of the top division of Swedish handball. 14 teams competed in the league. The eight highest placed teams qualified for the playoffs, whereas teams 11–12 had to play relegation playoffs against teams from the second division, and teams 13–14 were relegated automatically. IK Sävehof won the regular season and also won the playoffs to claim their first Swedish title. This season ended the dominance of Redbergslids IK and HK Drott; the two clubs won every title except one from 1983–84 to 2002–03, but have only won one title between them since.

== League table ==
Pos	Team	Pld	W	D	L	GF	GA	GD	Pts
1	IK Sävehof	26	22	0	4	777	649	128	44
2	IFK Skövde	26	19	2	5	800	710	90	40
3	Redbergslids IK	26	15	4	7	768	697	71	34
4	HK Drott	26	15	2	9	749	691	58	32
5	IFK Ystad	26	13	4	9	687	664	23	30
6	IF Guif	26	12	3	11	659	667	−8	27
7	GF Kroppskultur	26	11	4	11	643	664	−21	26
8	Lugi HF	26	11	2	13	693	709	−16	24
9	H 43 Lund	26	9	5	12	611	653	−42	23
10	Hammarby IF	26	9	3	14	750	745	5	21
11	IFK Tumba	26	9	2	15	656	709	−53	20
12	Djurgårdens IF	26	7	4	15	657	697	−40	18
13	Alingsås HK	26	6	5	15	697	753	−56	17
14	IFK Malmö	26	3	2	21	646	785	−139	8

== Playoffs ==
=== Quarterfinals ===
- Sävehof–Kroppskultur 22–21
- Kroppskultur–Sävehof 21–25

Sävehof won series 2–0

- Skövde–Lugi 27–19
- Lugi–Skövde 32–29
- Skövde–Lugi 27–23

Skövde won series 2–1

- Redbergslid–Guif 26–24
- Guif–Redbergslid 22–27

Redbergslid won series 2–0

- Drott–IFK Ystad 22–25
- IFK Ystad–Drott 21–20

IFK Ystad won series 2–0

=== Semifinals ===
- Sävehof–IFK Ystad 26–27
- IFK Ystad–Sävehof 19–29
- Sävehof–IFK Ystad 27–26
- IFK Ystad–Sävehof 26–30

Sävehof won series 3–1

- Skövde–Redbergslid 26–29
- Redbergslid–Skövde 32–35
- Skövde–Redbergslid 28–29
- Redbergslid–Skövde 29–19

Redbergslid won series 3–1

=== Finals ===
- Sävehof–Redbergslid 28–18
- Redbergslid–Sävehof 14–25
- Sävehof–Redbergslid 21–19

Sävehof won series 3–0
