= 1995–96 Elitserien (men's handball) =

Swedish handball season

Elitserien
- 1995–96

Tournament information
- Sport: Handball
- Teams: 12

Final positions
- Champions: Redbergslids IK (15th title)
- Runner-up: Lugi HF

The 1995–96 Elitserien was the 62nd season of the top division of Swedish handball. 12 teams competed in the league. The league was split into an autumn league and a spring league. The eight highest placed teams in the autumn league qualified for the spring league. Redbergslids IK won the regular season and also won the playoffs to claim their 15th Swedish title.

== League tables ==
=== Autumn ===
| Pos | Team | Pld | W | D | L | GF | GA | GD | Pts |
|---|---|---|---|---|---|---|---|---|---|
| 1 | Redbergslids IK | 16 | 14 | 1 | 1 | 471 | 370 | 101 | 29 |
| 2 | IK Sävehof | 16 | 11 | 2 | 3 | 440 | 367 | 73 | 24 |
| 3 | IF Guif | 16 | 9 | 4 | 3 | 472 | 432 | 40 | 22 |
| 4 | IFK Skövde | 16 | 10 | 1 | 5 | 461 | 410 | 51 | 21 |
| 5 | Lugi HF | 16 | 8 | 1 | 7 | 422 | 417 | 5 | 17 |
| 6 | HK Drott | 16 | 8 | 1 | 7 | 402 | 402 | 0 | 17 |
| 7 | IFK Kristianstad | 16 | 7 | 1 | 8 | 431 | 455 | −24 | 15 |
| 8 | Stockholmspolisens IF | 16 | 5 | 2 | 9 | 377 | 414 | −37 | 12 |
| 9 | Ystads IF | 16 | 5 | 1 | 10 | 366 | 389 | −23 | 11 |
| 10 | HF Linköpings Lejon | 16 | 3 | 3 | 10 | 425 | 450 | −25 | 9 |
| 11 | Irsta HF | 16 | 4 | 1 | 11 | 355 | 466 | −111 | 9 |
| 12 | Stavstens IF | 16 | 3 | 0 | 13 | 406 | 456 | −50 | 6 |

=== Spring ===
| Pos | Team | Pld | W | D | L | GF | GA | GD | Pts |
|---|---|---|---|---|---|---|---|---|---|
| 1 | Redbergslids IK | 30 | 23 | 2 | 5 | 829 | 697 | 132 | 48 |
| 2 | IK Sävehof | 30 | 20 | 4 | 6 | 806 | 714 | 92 | 44 |
| 3 | IFK Skövde | 30 | 19 | 3 | 8 | 857 | 773 | 84 | 41 |
| 4 | IF Guif | 30 | 14 | 5 | 11 | 831 | 786 | 45 | 33 |
| 5 | HK Drott | 30 | 14 | 2 | 14 | 784 | 750 | 34 | 30 |
| 6 | Lugi HF | 30 | 14 | 2 | 14 | 779 | 770 | 9 | 30 |
| 7 | IFK Kristianstad | 30 | 13 | 3 | 14 | 843 | 860 | −17 | 29 |
| 8 | Stockholmspolisens IF | 30 | 6 | 2 | 22 | 694 | 864 | −170 | 14 |

== Playoffs ==
=== Quarterfinals ===
- HK Drott–IF Guif 34–33, 25–23 (HK Drott won series 2–0)
- LUGI–Skövde HF 22–25, 28–21, 24–23 (LUGI won series 2–1)

=== Semifinals ===
- Redbergslids IK–HK Drott 27–26 a.e.t., 25–29, 35–23 (Redbergslids IK won series 2–1)
- LUGI–IK Sävehof 29–25, 29–22 (LUGI won series 2–0)

=== Finals ===
- Redbergslids IK–LUGI 27–25, 28–25, 30–15 (Redbergslids IK won series 3–0)
