= 1994–95 Elitserien (men's handball) =

Swedish handball season

Elitserien
- 1994–95

Tournament information
- Sport: Handball
- Teams: 12

Final positions
- Champions: Redbergslids IK (14th title)
- Runner-up: HK Drott

The 1994–95 Elitserien was the 61st season of the top division of Swedish handball. 12 teams competed in the league. The league was split into an autumn league and a spring league. The eight highest placed teams in the autumn league qualified for the spring league. HK Drott won the regular season, but Redbergslids IK won the playoffs and claimed their 14th Swedish title.

== League tables ==
=== Autumn ===
Pos	Team	Pld	W	D	L	GF	GA	GD	Pts
1	HK Drott	16	11	3	2	524	438	86	25
2	IF Guif	16	12	1	3	486	456	30	25
3	Redbergslids IK	16	10	2	4	413	373	40	22
4	IFK Skövde	16	10	1	5	467	440	27	21
5	IK Sävehof	16	8	2	6	387	418	−31	18
6	Irsta HF	16	8	0	8	384	418	−34	16
7	Stockholmspolisens IF	16	6	2	8	384	402	−18	14
8	IFK Kristianstad	16	6	1	9	419	444	−25	13
9	IF Saab	16	5	2	9	431	435	−4	12
10	Lugi HF	16	5	0	11	413	434	−21	10
11	Västra Frölunda IF	16	3	2	11	276	410	−134	8
12	IFK Karlskrona	16	3	2	11	405	470	−65	8

=== Spring ===
Pos	Team	Pld	W	D	L	GF	GA	GD	Pts
1	HK Drott	30	24	3	3	943	803	140	51
2	Redbergslids IK	30	19	5	6	825	721	104	43
3	IFK Skövde	30	18	2	10	843	807	36	38
4	IF Guif	30	17	4	9	884	862	22	38
5	IK Sävehof	30	14	3	13	754	749	5	31
6	IFK Kristianstad	30	10	2	18	807	850	−43	22
7	Stockholmspolisens IF	30	10	2	18	761	818	−57	22
8	Irsta HF	30	9	3	18	720	803	−83	21

== Playoffs ==
=== Quarterfinals ===
- IFK Skövde–IFK Kristianstad 32–36, 36–33, 26–23 (IFK Skövde won series 2–1)
- IK Sävehof–IF GUIF 24–27, 26–20, 28–26 a.e.t. (IK Sävehof won series 2–1)

=== Semifinals ===
- Redbergslids IFK Skövde 23–20, 21–25, 24–23 (Redbergslids IK won series 2–1)
- HK Drott–IK Sävehof 34–32 a.e.t., 36–29 (HK Drott won series 2–0)

=== Finals ===
- Redbergslids IK–HK Drott 24–40, 26–21, 16–17, 26–23, 19–17 (Redbergslids IK won series 3–2)
