= 2005–06 Elitserien (men's handball) =

Swedish handball season

Elitserien
- 2005–06

Tournament information
- Sport: Handball
- Teams: 14

Final positions
- Champions: Hammarby IF (1st title)
- Runner-up: IK Sävehof

The 2005–06 Elitserien was the 72nd season of the top division of Swedish handball. 14 teams competed in the league. The eight highest placed teams qualified for the playoffs, whereas teams 11–12 had to play relegation playoffs against teams from the second division, and teams 13–14 were relegated automatically. IK Sävehof won the regular season, but Hammarby IF won the playoffs and claimed their first Swedish title.

== League table ==
Pos	Team	Pld	W	D	L	GF	GA	GD	Pts
1	IK Sävehof	26	19	3	4	810	673	137	41
2	Hammarby IF	26	19	1	6	861	749	112	39
3	Lugi HF	26	18	1	7	780	678	102	37
4	IFK Skövde	26	16	2	8	806	723	83	34
5	IFK Ystad	26	17	0	9	735	701	34	34
6	LIF Lindesberg	26	14	2	10	840	842	−2	30
7	HK Drott	26	11	4	11	701	688	13	26
8	Redbergslids IK	26	11	3	12	706	693	13	25
9	H 43 Lund	26	11	3	12	793	795	−2	25
10	IF Guif	26	12	1	13	701	740	−39	25
11	Alingsås HK	26	9	2	15	698	764	−66	20
12	IK Heim	26	6	4	16	672	725	−53	16
13	Önnereds HK	26	2	2	22	664	788	−124	6
14	Djurgårdens IF	26	3	0	23	635	843	−208	6

== Playoffs bracket ==
Quarterfinals
1	IK Sävehof	36	35	35
6	LIF Lindesberg	27	33	26
3	Lugi HF	25	21	25	26	25
4	HK Drott	26	23	15	23	22
2	Hammarby IF	34	27	34	29
5	IFK Ystad	30	29*	25	23
4	IFK Skövde	35	31	27	24	32*
8	Redbergslids IK	28	30	33	26	29

Semifinals
1	IK Sävehof	35	22	32	31
3	Lugi HF	32	23	19	25
2	Hammarby IF	28	28	30	26	34
4	IFK Skövde	29	23	33	25	29

Final
1	IK Sävehof	31
2	Hammarby IF	34

- An asterisk (*) denotes result after extra time
