= 1969–70 Allsvenskan (men's handball) =

Swedish handball season

Allsvenskan
- 1969–70

Tournament information
- Sport: Handball
- Teams: 10

Final positions
- Champions: SoIK Hellas (4th title)
- Runner-up: HK Drott

The 1969–70 Allsvenskan was the 36th season of the top division of Swedish handball. 10 teams competed in the league. HK Drott won the regular season, but SoIK Hellas won the playoffs and claimed their fourth Swedish title. UoIF Matteuspojkarna and Vikingarnas IF were relegated.

== League table ==
Pos	Team	Pld	W	D	L	GF	GA	GD	Pts
1	HK Drott	18	11	5	2	324	371	53	27
2	SoIK Hellas	18	11	3	4	352	378	74	25
3	Redbergslids IK	18	11	2	5	347	299	48	24
4	IF Saab	18	8	4	6	340	340	0	20
5	IFK Malmö	18	9	1	8	319	338	−19	19
6	Ystads IF	18	7	3	8	309	293	16	17
7	IF Guif	18	7	2	9	305	316	−11	16
8	IF Start	18	7	2	9	352	377	−25	16
9	H 43 Lund	18	5	4	9	304	338	−34	14
10	IS Göta	18	1	0	17	305	407	−102	2

== Playoffs ==
=== Semifinals ===
- SoIK Hellas–Redbergslids IK 12–10, 12–12 (SoIK Hellas advance to the finals)
- HK Drott–IF Saab 18–14, 15–18 (HK Drott advance to the finals)

=== Finals ===
- SoIK Hellas–HK Drott 20–17, 11–11 (SoIK Hellas champions)
