= 2002–03 Elitserien (men's handball) =

Swedish handball season

Elitserien
- 2002–03

Tournament information
- Sport: Handball
- Teams: 12

Final positions
- Champions: Redbergslids IK (20th title)
- Runner-up: HK Drott

The 2002–03 Elitserien was the 69th season of the top division of Swedish handball. 12 teams competed in the league. The league was split into an autumn league and a spring league. The eight highest placed teams in the autumn league qualified for the spring league, whereas the four lowest placed teams qualified for Allsvenskan along with the highest placed teams from the autumn season of Division I (the second level). The six highest placed teams in the spring season of Elitserien qualified for the quarterfinals, whereas the two lowest placed teams qualified for the preliminary round of the playoffs, along with the two highest placed teams of Allsvenskan. Redbergslids IK won the regular season and also won the playoffs to claim their 20th Swedish title.

== League tables ==
=== Autumn ===
Pos	Team	Pld	W	D	L	GF	GA	GD	Pts
1	Redbergslids IK	22	18	3	1	689	529	160	39
2	IFK Ystad	22	14	3	5	560	507	53	31
3	HK Drott	22	15	1	6	597	549	48	31
4	IK Sävehof	22	12	4	6	596	539	57	28
5	IFK Skövde	22	10	2	10	564	560	4	22
6	H 43 Lund	22	9	3	10	531	544	−13	21
7	IFK Tumba	22	8	2	12	537	566	−29	18
8	Hammarby IF	22	8	2	12	579	622	−43	18
9	IF Guif	22	6	5	11	504	563	−59	17
10	Djurgårdens IF	22	7	2	13	523	532	−9	16
11	Lugi HF	22	7	1	14	545	590	−45	15
12	GIK Wasaiterna	22	4	0	18	505	629	−124	8

=== Spring ===
Pos	Team	Pld	W	D	L	GF	GA	GD	Pts
1	Redbergslids IK	36	28	5	3	1121	904	217	61
2	IK Sävehof	36	20	7	9	1000	897	103	47
3	HK Drott	36	22	1	13	965	903	62	45
4	IFK Ystad	36	19	5	12	909	884	25	43
5	IFK Skövde	36	19	3	14	943	924	19	41
6	IFK Tumba	36	13	2	21	860	917	−57	28
7	Hammarby IF	36	12	4	20	944	1014	−70	28
8	H 43 Lund	36	11	5	20	850	912	−62	27

== Playoffs ==
=== First round ===
- Kroppskultur–H 43 22–27
- H 43–Kroppskultur 23–26

H 43 won 50–48 on aggregate

- Guif–Hammarby 31–21
- Hammarby–Guif 24–19

Guif won 50–45 on aggregate

=== Quarterfinals ===
- Redbergslid–Guif 26–24
- Guif–Redbergslid 23–34
- Redbergslid–Guif 36–24

Redbergslid won series 3–0

- Sävehof–Tumba 25–21
- Tumba–Sävehof 19–30
- Sävehof–Tumba 30–21

Sävehof won series 3–0

- Drott–H 43 37–36
- H 43–Drott 22–25
- Drott–H 43 32–23

Drott won series 3–0

- Ystad–Skövde 29–28
- Skövde–Ystad 25–24
- Ystad–Skövde 32–26
- Skövde–Ystad 28–24
- Ystad–Skövde 25–30

Skövde won series 3–2

=== Semifinals ===
- Sävehof–Drott 22–27
- Drott–Sävehof 26–25
- Sävehof–Drott 29–32

Drott won series 3–0

- Redbergslid–Skövde 31–25
- Skövde–Redbergslid 29–35
- Redbergslid–Skövde 37–33

Redbergslid won series 3–0

=== Finals ===
- Redbergslid–Drott 31–24
- Drott–Redbergslid 25–32
- Redbergslid–Drott 35–20

Redbergslid won series 3–0
