= 1964–65 Allsvenskan (men's handball) =

Swedish handball season

Allsvenskan
- 1964–65

Tournament information
- Sport: Handball
- Teams: 10

Final positions
- Champions: Redbergslids IK (8th title)
- Runner-up: KFUM Borås

The 1964–65 Allsvenskan was the 31st season of the top division of Swedish handball. 10 teams competed in the league. Redbergslids IK won the league and claimed their eighth Swedish title. IK Heim and LUGI were relegated.

== League table ==
Pos	Team	Pld	W	D	L	GF	GA	GD	Pts
1	Redbergslids IK	18	13	1	4	402	338	64	27
2	KFUM Borås	18	12	2	4	416	347	69	26
3	IF Saab	18	9	4	5	332	313	19	22
4	IF Hallby	18	8	3	7	341	366	−25	19
5	Vikingarnas IF	18	7	2	9	399	383	16	16
6	SoIK Hellas	18	7	2	9	347	374	−27	16
7	H 43 Lund	18	7	1	10	401	422	−21	15
8	IK Tord	18	5	4	9	322	334	−12	14
9	IK Heim	18	6	2	10	359	408	−49	14
10	LUGI	18	4	3	11	315	349	−34	11
