= 1967–68 Allsvenskan (men's handball) =

Swedish handball season

Allsvenskan
- 1967–68

Tournament information
- Sport: Handball
- Teams: 10

Final positions
- Champions: IF Saab (1st title)
- Runner-up: SoIK Hellas

The 1967–68 Allsvenskan was the 34th season of the top division of Swedish handball. 10 teams competed in the league. A playoffs at the end of the season to determine the champions was introduced this season. SoIK Hellas won the regular season, but IF Saab won the playoffs and claimed their first Swedish title. Sandvikens HK and GIK Wasaiterna were relegated.

== League table ==
Pos	Team	Pld	W	D	L	GF	GA	GD	Pts
1	SoIK Hellas	18	13	4	1	419	342	77	30
2	IF Saab	18	12	3	3	350	316	34	27
3	Redbergslids IK	18	12	2	4	407	337	70	26
4	IF Guif	18	9	5	4	325	306	19	23
5	UoIF Matteuspojkarna	18	9	1	8	385	380	5	19
6	IS Göta	18	7	3	8	362	364	−2	17
7	H 43 Lund	18	5	3	10	363	405	−42	13
8	Vikingarnas IF	18	6	1	11	330	373	−43	13
9	Sandvikens HK	18	4	1	13	327	349	−22	9
10	GIK Wasaiterna	18	1	1	16	369	465	−96	3

== Playoffs ==
=== Semifinals ===
- IF Saab–Redbergslids IK 18–19, 18–17 (IF Saab advance to the finals)
- SoIK Hellas–GUIF 20–11, 26–23 (SoIK Hellas advance to the finals)

=== Finals ===
- IF Saab–SoIK Hellas 17–17, 18–17 (IF Saab champions)
