= 1990–91 Elitserien (men's handball) =

Swedish handball season

Elitserien
- 1990–91

Tournament information
- Sport: Handball
- Teams: 12

Final positions
- Champions: HK Drott (7th title)
- Runner-up: Irsta HF

The 1990–91 Elitserien was the 57th season of the top division of Swedish handball and the first under that name. 12 teams competed in the league. The league was split into an autumn league and a spring league. The eight highest placed teams in the autumn league qualified for the spring league. HK Drott won the regular season and also won the playoffs to claim their seventh Swedish title.

== League tables ==
=== Autumn ===
Pos	Team	Pld	W	D	L	GF	GA	GD	Pts
1	HK Drott	16	13	1	2	378	308	70	27
2	Lugi HF	16	10	1	5	358	330	28	21
3	IFK Skövde	16	10	1	5	338	324	14	21
4	Irsta HF	16	9	2	5	316	292	24	20
5	IK Sävehof	16	9	1	6	358	329	29	19
6	Ystads IF	16	8	2	6	341	323	18	18
7	Redbergslids IK	16	7	4	5	344	348	−4	18
8	BK Söder	16	6	1	9	328	353	−25	13
9	IFK Kristianstad	16	5	2	9	353	372	−19	12
10	IF Saab	16	5	2	9	337	365	−28	12
11	IF Guif	16	4	0	12	289	324	−35	8
12	HP Warta	16	0	3	13	327	399	−72	3

=== Spring ===
Pos	Team	Pld	W	D	L	GF	GA	GD	Pts
1	HK Drott	30	25	1	4	761	624	137	51
2	Irsta HF	30	20	2	8	616	563	53	42
3	Ystads IF	30	16	2	12	632	607	25	34
4	Lugi HF	30	16	1	13	670	650	20	33
5	IK Sävehof	30	15	1	14	646	635	11	31
6	Redbergslids IK	30	12	4	14	636	654	−18	28
7	IFK Skövde	30	13	1	16	609	637	−28	27
8	BK Söder	30	11	1	18	630	676	−46	23

== Playoffs ==
=== Quarterfinals ===
- LUGI HF–IK Sävehof 25–20
- IK Sävehof–LUGI HF 25–24
- LUGI HF–IK Sävehof 24–18

LUGI won series 2–1

- Redbergslids IK–Ystads IF 23–27
- Ystads IF–Redbergslids IK 21–17

Ystads IF won series 2–0

=== Semifinals ===
- LUGI HF–HK Drott 19–21
- HK Drott–LUGI HF 24–20

HK Drott won series 2–0

- Irsta HF–Ystads IF 27–28
- Ystads IF–Irsta HF 17–18
- Irsta HF–Ystads IF 22–20

Irsta HF won series 2–1

=== Finals ===
- HK Drott–Irsta HF 22–20
- Irsta HF–HK Drott 17–19
- HK Drott–Irsta HF 23–15

HK Drott won series 3–0
