= 1966–67 Allsvenskan (men's handball) =

Swedish handball season

Allsvenskan
- 1966–67

Tournament information
- Sport: Handball
- Teams: 10

Final positions
- Champions: Vikingarnas IF (2nd title)
- Runner-up: SoIK Hellas

The 1966–67 Allsvenskan was the 33rd season of the top division of Swedish handball. 10 teams competed in the league. Vikingarnas IF won the league and claimed their second Swedish title. IK Tord and Göteborgs IK were relegated.

== League table ==
Pos	Team	Pld	W	D	L	GF	GA	GD	Pts
1	Vikingarnas IF	18	14	1	3	432	350	82	29
2	SoIK Hellas	18	13	0	5	408	352	56	26
3	IS Göta	18	11	3	4	423	352	71	25
4	Sandvikens HK	18	9	3	6	353	333	20	21
5	IF Saab	18	10	0	8	374	328	46	20
6	Redbergslids IK	18	8	1	9	386	393	−7	17
7	IF Guif	18	5	4	9	301	356	−55	14
8	H 43 Lund	18	5	3	10	354	389	−35	13
9	IK Tord	18	4	2	12	316	385	−69	10
10	Göteborgs IK	18	2	1	15	304	413	−109	5
