= 2004–05 Elitserien (men's handball) =

Swedish handball season

Elitserien
- 2004–05

Tournament information
- Sport: Handball
- Teams: 14

Final positions
- Champions: IK Sävehof (2nd title)
- Runner-up: IFK Skövde

The 2004–05 Elitserien was the 71st season of the top division of Swedish handball. 14 teams competed in the league. The eight highest placed teams qualified for the playoffs, whereas teams 11–12 had to play relegation playoffs against teams from the second division, and teams 13–14 were relegated automatically. IFK Skövde won the regular season, but IK Sävehof won the playoffs and claimed their second Swedish title.

== League table ==
Pos	Team	Pld	W	D	L	GF	GA	GD	Pts
1	IFK Skövde	26	20	3	3	928	709	219	43
2	IK Sävehof	26	19	4	3	858	660	198	42
3	IFK Ystad	26	18	0	8	772	690	82	36
4	Hammarby IF	26	16	1	9	796	721	75	33
5	HK Drott	26	14	2	10	716	687	29	30
6	IF Guif	26	13	4	9	713	685	28	30
7	Redbergslids IK	26	13	4	9	693	680	13	30
8	Lugi HF	26	14	1	11	696	676	20	29
9	GF Kroppskultur	26	10	3	13	734	755	−21	23
10	H 43 Lund	26	7	3	16	635	719	−84	17
11	IFK Tumba	26	7	2	17	676	769	−93	16
12	Djurgårdens IF	26	6	2	18	650	801	−151	14
13	IVH Västerås	26	6	2	18	636	800	−164	14
14	BK Heid	26	3	1	22	668	819	−151	7

== Playoffs bracket ==
Quarterfinals
1	IFK Skövde	35	29	37
7	Redbergslids IK	28	28	19
4	Hammarby IF	25	37	25	27	33
6	IF Guif	19	35	28	31	26
2	IK Sävehof	30	27	38
8	Lugi HF	23	23	27
3	IFK Ystad	23	23	25	20
5	HK Drott	27	28	16	23

Semifinals
1	IFK Skövde	31	26	39	32
4	Hammarby IF	33	22	31	29
2	IK Sävehof	30	28	31
5	HK Drott	16	24	19

Final
1	IFK Skövde	26
2	IK Sävehof	27
