= 1959–60 Allsvenskan (men's handball) =

Swedish handball season

Allsvenskan
- 1959–60

Tournament information
- Sport: Handball
- Teams: 10

Final positions
- Champions: IK Heim (4th title)
- Runner-up: Lugi HF

The 1959–60 Allsvenskan was the 26th season of the top division of Swedish handball. 10 teams competed in the league. IK Heim won the league and claimed their fourth Swedish title. IF Guif and IFK Malmö were relegated.

== League table ==
Pos	Team	Pld	W	D	L	GF	GA	GD	Pts
1	IK Heim	18	15	0	3	417	322	95	30
2	LUGI	18	13	1	4	370	315	55	27
3	H 43 Lund	18	12	0	6	345	333	12	24
4	Majornas IK	18	10	0	8	311	325	−14	20
5	Redbergslids IK	18	9	1	8	324	315	9	19
6	IFK Karlskrona	18	7	1	10	329	356	−27	15
7	Skövde AIK	18	6	2	10	351	372	−21	14
8	AIK	18	6	0	12	330	348	−18	12
9	IF Guif	18	5	0	13	378	414	−36	10
10	IFK Malmö	18	4	1	13	329	384	−55	9
