= 1972–73 Allsvenskan (men's handball) =

Swedish handball season

Allsvenskan
- 1972–73

Tournament information
- Sport: Handball
- Teams: 10

Final positions
- Champions: IF Saab (2nd title)
- Runner-up: SoIK Hellas

The 1972–73 Allsvenskan was the 39th season of the top division of Swedish handball. 10 teams competed in the league. IF Saab won the regular season and also won the playoffs to claim their second Swedish title. IF Guif and IFK Lidingö were relegated.

== League table ==
Pos	Team	Pld	W	D	L	GF	GA	GD	Pts
1	IF Saab	18	13	1	4	333	292	41	27
2	HK Drott	18	10	4	4	283	277	6	24
3	SoIK Hellas	18	8	4	6	302	288	14	20
4	IFK Malmö	18	9	2	7	287	275	12	20
5	IFK Kristianstad	18	7	4	7	278	279	−1	18
6	Redbergslids IK	18	7	3	8	300	306	−6	17
7	LUGI	18	7	2	9	317	313	4	16
8	Västra Frölunda IF	18	7	2	9	273	271	2	16
9	IF Guif	18	6	3	9	270	288	−18	15
10	IFK Lidingö	18	2	3	13	253	307	−54	7

== Playoffs ==
=== Semifinals ===
- IF Saab–IFK Malmö 26–18, 19–29, 19–6 (IF Saab advance to the finals)
- SoIK Hellas–HK Drott 17–14, 19–17 (SoIK Hellas advance to the finals)

=== Finals ===
- IF Saab–SoIK Hellas 14–14, 22–12 (IF Saab champions)
