= 1988–89 Allsvenskan (men's handball) =

Swedish handball season

Allsvenskan
- 1988–89

Tournament information
- Sport: Handball
- Teams: 12

Final positions
- Champions: Redbergslids IK (12th title)
- Runner-up: HK Drott

The 1988–89 Allsvenskan was the 55th season of the top division of Swedish handball. 12 teams competed in the league. HK Drott won the regular season but Redbergslids IK won the playoffs and claimed their 12th Swedish title. GF Kroppskultur, IFK Malmö and IFK Karlskrona were relegated.

== League table ==
| Pos | Team | Pld | W | D | L | GF | GA | GD | Pts |
|---|---|---|---|---|---|---|---|---|---|
| 1 | HK Drott | 22 | 17 | 2 | 3 | 533 | 459 | 74 | 36 |
| 2 | Redbergslids IK | 22 | 16 | 2 | 4 | 576 | 494 | 82 | 34 |
| 3 | IK Sävehof | 22 | 15 | 2 | 5 | 523 | 462 | 61 | 32 |
| 4 | LUGI | 22 | 16 | 0 | 6 | 524 | 470 | 54 | 32 |
| 5 | IF Guif | 22 | 9 | 5 | 8 | 496 | 496 | 0 | 23 |
| 6 | HK Cliff | 22 | 10 | 1 | 11 | 494 | 488 | 6 | 21 |
| 7 | Katrineholms AIK | 22 | 9 | 2 | 11 | 489 | 491 | −2 | 20 |
| 8 | IF Saab | 22 | 8 | 2 | 12 | 469 | 506 | −37 | 18 |
| 9 | Ystads IF | 22 | 7 | 2 | 13 | 479 | 499 | −20 | 16 |
| 10 | GF Kroppskultur | 22 | 5 | 2 | 15 | 452 | 522 | −70 | 12 |
| 11 | IFK Malmö | 22 | 4 | 2 | 16 | 474 | 545 | −71 | 10 |
| 12 | IFK Karlskrona | 22 | 5 | 0 | 17 | 396 | 473 | −77 | 10 |

== Playoffs ==
=== Semifinals ===
- LUGI–HK Drott 22–19, 28–30 (p), 17–18 (HK Drott won series 2–1)
- IK Sävehof–Redbergslids IK 13–20, 16–28 (Redbergslids IK won series 2–0)

=== Finals ===
- Redbergslids IK–HK Drott 28–24, 22–17, 22–20 (Redbergslids IK won series 3–0)
