= 1983–84 Allsvenskan (men's handball) =

Swedish handball season

Allsvenskan
- 1983–84

Tournament information
- Sport: Handball
- Teams: 12

Final positions
- Champions: HK Drott (4th title)
- Runner-up: Lugi HF

The 1983–84 Allsvenskan was the 50th season of the top division of Swedish handball. 12 teams competed in the league. Ystads IF won the regular season, but HK Drott won the playoffs and claimed their fourth Swedish title. IK Heim and Visby IF Gute were relegated.

== League table ==
Pos	Team	Pld	W	D	L	GF	GA	GD	Pts
1	Ystads IF	22	15	0	7	513	461	52	30
2	Västra Frölunda IF	22	13	2	7	524	480	44	28
3	HK Drott	22	12	2	8	513	456	57	26
4	LUGI	22	12	2	8	517	484	33	26
5	Redbergslids IK	22	12	1	9	485	485	0	25
6	H 43 Lund	22	10	1	10	488	494	−6	21
7	IFK Karlskrona	22	10	1	11	495	506	−11	21
8	HP Warta	22	10	1	11	479	517	−38	21
9	IF Guif	22	9	2	11	469	482	−13	20
10	IK Heim	22	8	3	11	510	517	−7	19
11	GF Kroppskultur	22	6	3	13	524	575	−51	15
12	Visby IF Gute	22	5	2	15	445	505	−60	12

== Playoffs ==
=== Semifinals ===
- Västra Frölunda–HK Drott 17–21, 23–15, 15–19 (HK Drott advance to the finals)
- Ystads IF–LUGI 17–15, 23–25, 17–22 (LUGI advance to the finals)

=== Finals ===
- HK Drott–LUGI 22–17, 17–14, 21–15 (HK Drott champions)
