= 1960–61 Allsvenskan (men's handball) =

Swedish handball season

Allsvenskan
- 1960–61

Tournament information
- Sport: Handball
- Teams: 10

Final positions
- Champions: Vikingarnas IF (1st title)
- Runner-up: IK Heim

The 1960–61 Allsvenskan was the 27th season of the top division of Swedish handball. 10 teams competed in the league. Vikingarnas IF won the league and claimed their first Swedish title. IFK Karlskrona and AIK were relegated.

== League table ==
Pos	Team	Pld	W	D	L	GF	GA	GD	Pts
1	Vikingarnas IF	18	14	0	4	418	370	48	28
2	IK Heim	18	12	1	5	410	339	71	25
3	LUGI	18	9	1	8	374	333	41	19
4	H 43 Lund	18	9	1	8	355	357	−2	19
5	Örebro SK	18	8	2	8	384	359	25	18
6	Redbergslids IK	18	8	1	9	333	337	−4	17
7	Skövde AIK	18	8	1	9	377	389	−12	17
8	Majornas IK	18	8	0	10	379	407	−28	16
9	IFK Karlskrona	18	8	0	10	324	376	−52	16
10	AIK	18	2	1	15	332	419	−87	5
