= 1984–85 Allsvenskan (men's handball) =

Swedish handball season

Allsvenskan
- 1984–85

Tournament information
- Sport: Handball
- Teams: 12

Final positions
- Champions: Redbergslids IK (9th title)
- Runner-up: HK Drott

The 1984–85 Allsvenskan was the 51st season of the top division of Swedish handball. 12 teams competed in the league. Redbergslids IK won the regular season and also won the playoffs to claim their ninth Swedish title. Borlänge HK were relegated.

== League table ==
Pos	Team	Pld	W	D	L	GF	GA	GD	Pts
1	Redbergslids IK	22	16	2	4	545	476	69	34
2	HK Drott	22	15	2	5	484	440	44	32
3	LUGI	22	12	1	9	492	467	25	25
4	IF Guif	22	12	1	9	502	481	21	25
5	HP Warta	22	10	4	8	456	444	12	24
6	Västra Frölunda IF	22	10	3	9	498	500	−2	23
7	Ystads IF	22	10	2	10	501	492	9	22
8	GF Kroppskultur	22	10	2	10	491	492	−1	22
9	IFK Kristianstad	22	8	5	9	499	494	5	21
10	IFK Karlskrona	22	8	2	12	475	497	−22	18
11	H 43 Lund	22	6	2	14	472	520	−48	14
12	Borlänge HK	22	2	0	20	433	545	−112	4

== Playoffs ==
=== Semifinals ===
- Redbergslids IK–GUIF 23–24, 31–25, 34–27 (Redbergslids IK advance to the finals)
- HK Drott–LUGI 26–19, 10–16, 17–16 (HK Drott advance to the finals)

=== Finals ===
- Redbergslids IK–HK Drott 19–18, 24–28, 19–21, 19–15, 21–20 (Redbergslids IK champions)
