= 1975–76 Allsvenskan (men's handball) =

Swedish handball season

Allsvenskan
- 1975–76

Tournament information
- Sport: Handball
- Teams: 10

Final positions
- Champions: Ystads IF (1st title)
- Runner-up: IK Heim

The 1975–76 Allsvenskan was the 42nd season of the top division of Swedish handball. 10 teams competed in the league. IK Heim won the regular season, but Ystads IF won the playoffs and claimed their first Swedish title. Malmbergets AIF were relegated.

== League table ==
| Pos | Team | Pld | W | D | L | GF | GA | GD | Pts |
|---|---|---|---|---|---|---|---|---|---|
| 1 | IK Heim | 18 | 12 | 0 | 6 | 378 | 338 | 40 | 24 |
| 2 | Ystads IF | 18 | 12 | 0 | 6 | 365 | 332 | 33 | 24 |
| 3 | IFK Malmö | 18 | 11 | 1 | 6 | 344 | 331 | 13 | 23 |
| 4 | SoIK Hellas | 18 | 11 | 0 | 7 | 311 | 307 | 4 | 22 |
| 5 | IF Guif | 18 | 9 | 1 | 8 | 344 | 350 | −6 | 19 |
| 6 | LUGI | 18 | 8 | 2 | 8 | 353 | 334 | 19 | 18 |
| 7 | Västra Frölunda IF | 18 | 8 | 1 | 9 | 315 | 311 | 4 | 17 |
| 8 | IFK Kristianstad | 18 | 8 | 0 | 10 | 333 | 340 | −7 | 16 |
| 9 | HK Drott | 18 | 6 | 1 | 11 | 291 | 310 | −19 | 13 |
| 10 | Malmbergets AIF | 18 | 1 | 2 | 15 | 337 | 418 | −81 | 4 |

== Playoffs ==
=== Semifinals ===
- Ystads IF−IFK Malmö 23−14, 13−13 (Ystads IF advance to the finals)
- IK Heim−SoIK Hellas 20−15, 15−18, 13−12 (IK Heim advance to the finals)

=== Finals ===
- Ystads IF−IK Heim 21−23, 15−12, 17−13 (Ystads IF champions)
