= 1973–74 Allsvenskan (men's handball) =

Swedish handball season

Allsvenskan
- 1973–74

Tournament information
- Sport: Handball
- Teams: 10

Final positions
- Champions: IF Saab (3rd title)
- Runner-up: SoIK Hellas

The 1973–74 Allsvenskan was the 40th season of the top division of Swedish handball. 10 teams competed in the league. IFK Malmö won the regular season, but IF Saab won the playoffs and claimed their third Swedish title. Redbergslids IK and HP Warta were relegated. IFK Malmö's regular season average attendance has been estimated between 3300 and 4000, the highest ever in Swedish handball until IFK Kristianstad in the 2010s.

== League table ==
Pos	Team	Pld	W	D	L	GF	GA	GD	Pts
1	IFK Malmö	18	14	1	3	302	260	42	29
2	Västra Frölunda IF	18	12	3	3	276	246	30	27
3	SoIK Hellas	18	11	1	6	323	264	59	23
4	IF Saab	18	10	2	6	348	324	24	22
5	IFK Kristianstad	18	9	3	6	302	288	14	21
6	HK Drott	18	8	2	8	299	299	0	18
7	Ystads IF	18	4	3	11	273	297	−24	11
8	LUGI	18	4	3	11	293	332	−39	11
9	Redbergslids IK	18	5	1	12	278	323	−45	11
10	HP Warta	18	3	1	14	257	318	−61	7

== Playoffs ==
=== Semifinaler ===
- IF Saab–Västra Frölunda IF 13–11, 15–17, 24–21 (Saab advance to the finals)
- SoIK Hellas–IFK Malmö 15–17, 14–11, 17–16 (SoIK Hellas advance to the finals)

=== Finaler ===
- IF Saab–SoIK Hellas 21–15, 14–17, 20–17 (IF Saab champions)
