= 1999–2000 Elitserien (men's handball) =

Swedish handball season

Elitserien
- 1999–2000

Tournament information
- Sport: Handball
- Teams: 12

Final positions
- Champions: Redbergslids IK (18th title)
- Runner-up: HK Drott

The 1999–2000 Elitserien was the 66th season of the top division of Swedish handball. 12 teams competed in the league. The league was split into an autumn league and a spring league. The eight highest placed teams in the autumn league qualified for the spring league, whereas the four lowest placed teams qualified for Allsvenskan along with the highest placed teams from the autumn season of Division I (the second level). The six highest placed teams in the spring season of Elitserien qualified for the quarterfinals, whereas the two lowest placed teams qualified for the preliminary round of the playoffs, along with the two highest placed teams of Allsvenskan. Redbergslids IK won the regular season and also won the playoffs to claim their 18th Swedish title.

== League tables ==
=== Autumn ===
Pos	Team	Pld	W	D	L	GF	GA	GD	Pts
1	Redbergslids IK	16	10	5	1	397	317	80	25
2	HK Drott	16	11	1	4	401	354	47	23
3	IFK Skövde	16	9	3	4	371	346	25	21
4	IK Sävehof	16	9	1	6	364	341	23	19
5	IF Guif	16	8	2	6	386	367	19	18
6	IFK Ystad	16	5	5	6	355	352	3	15
7	Lugi HF	16	7	1	8	345	369	−24	15
8	HP Warta	16	6	2	8	330	341	−11	14
9	Alingsås HK	16	5	4	7	352	372	−20	14
10	GIK Wasaiterna	16	4	4	8	354	399	−45	12
11	IFK Tumba	16	5	1	10	341	367	−26	11
12	GF Kroppskultur	16	1	3	12	300	371	−71	5

=== Spring ===
Pos	Team	Pld	W	D	L	GF	GA	GD	Pts
1	Redbergslids IK	30	18	7	5	754	616	138	43
2	HK Drott	30	20	1	9	735	658	77	41
3	IFK Skövde	30	17	3	10	708	674	34	37
4	IF Guif	30	16	2	12	720	689	31	34
5	Lugi HF	30	14	2	14	657	684	−27	30
6	IK Sävehof	30	14	1	15	676	670	6	29
7	IFK Ystad	30	11	5	14	656	693	−37	27
8	HP Warta	30	9	3	18	613	673	−60	21

== Playoffs ==
=== First round ===
- Alingsås HK–IFK Ystad 24–18
- IFK Ystad–Alingsås HK 22–32

Alingsås HK won 56–40 on aggregate

- H 43 Lund–HP Warta 17–18
- HP Warta–H 43 Lund 24–22

HP Warta won 42–39 on aggregate

=== Quarterfinals ===
- Redbergslid–Warta 21–19
- Warta–Redbergslid 16–23
- Redbergslid–Warta 27–18

Redbergslid won series 3–0

- Drott–Alingsås 25–22
- Alingsås–Drott 25–28
- Drott–Alingsås 28–17

Drott won series 3–0

- Guif–Lugi 20–18
- Lugi–Guif 27–15
- Guif–Lugi 25–16
- Lugi–Guif 17–22

Guif won series 3–1

- Skövde–Sävehof 22–29
- Sävehof–Skövde 18–20
- Skövde–Sävehof 19–20
- Sävehof–Skövde 18–20
- Skövde–Sävehof 24–21

Skövde won series 3–2

=== Semifinals ===
- Redbergslid–Skövde 24–19
- Skövde–Redbergslid 18–22
- Redbergslid–Skövde 22–21

Redbergslid won series 3–0

- Drott–Guif 29–26
- Guif–Drott 27–34
- Drott–Guif 26–18

Drott won series 3–0

=== Finals ===
- Redbergslid–Drott 28–20
- Drott–Redbergslid 26–24
- Redbergslid–Drott 25–22

Redbergslid won series 2–1
