= 1953–54 Allsvenskan (men's handball) =

Swedish handball season

Allsvenskan
- 1953–54

Tournament information
- Sport: Handball
- Teams: 10

Final positions
- Champions: Redbergslids IK (4th title)
- Runner-up: IFK Kristianstad

The 1953–54 Allsvenskan was the 20th season of the top division of Swedish handball. 10 teams competed in the league. Redbergslids IK won the league and claimed their fourth Swedish title. IFK Borås and Västra Frölunda IF were relegated.

== League table ==
Pos	Team	Pld	W	D	L	GF	GA	GD	Pts
1	Redbergslids IK	18	11	4	3	240	203	37	26
2	IFK Kristianstad	18	12	1	5	283	252	31	25
3	Örebro SK	18	11	0	7	241	204	37	22
4	IFK Malmö	18	10	0	8	263	263	0	20
5	Majornas IK	18	8	2	8	216	228	−12	18
6	IK Heim	18	8	1	9	212	212	0	17
7	AIK	18	8	1	9	215	225	−10	17
8	IFK Karlskrona	18	7	2	9	237	247	−10	16
9	IFK Borås	18	6	1	11	230	226	4	13
10	Västra Frölunda IF	18	3	0	15	190	267	−77	6
