= 1974–75 Allsvenskan (men's handball) =

Swedish handball season

Allsvenskan
- 1974–75

Tournament information
- Sport: Handball
- Teams: 10

Final positions
- Champions: HK Drott (1st title)
- Runner-up: IFK Kristianstad

The 1974–75 Allsvenskan was the 41st season of the top division of Swedish handball. 10 teams competed in the league. Västra Frölunda IF won the regular season, but HK Drott won the playoffs and claimed their first Swedish title. IF Saab and IFK Lidingö were relegated.

== League table ==
Pos	Team	Pld	W	D	L	GF	GA	GD	Pts
1	Västra Frölunda IF	18	13	1	4	342	299	43	27
2	IFK Kristianstad	18	10	1	7	317	313	4	21
3	IK Heim	18	8	4	6	336	339	−3	20
4	HK Drott	18	9	1	8	331	309	22	19
5	LUGI	18	8	2	8	310	312	−2	18
6	Ystads IF	18	7	4	7	320	325	−5	18
7	SoIK Hellas	18	8	1	9	329	345	−16	17
8	IFK Malmö	18	7	2	9	283	287	−4	16
9	IF Saab	18	7	1	10	332	339	−7	15
10	IFK Lidingö	18	4	1	13	329	361	−32	9

== Playoffs ==
=== Semifinals ===
- HK Drott−Västra Frölunda IF 15−15, 14−14, 16−14 (HK Drott advance to the finals)
- IFK Kristianstad−IK Heim 15−17, 20−15, 14−13 (IFK Kristianstad advance to the finals)

=== Finals ===
- HK Drott-IFK Kristianstad 18−18, 14−12 (HK Drott champions)
