= 1986–87 Allsvenskan (men's handball) =

Swedish handball season

Allsvenskan
- 1986–87

Tournament information
- Sport: Handball
- Teams: 12

Final positions
- Champions: Redbergslids IK (11th title)
- Runner-up: HK Drott

The 1986–87 Allsvenskan was the 53rd season of the top division of Swedish handball. 12 teams competed in the league. Redbergslids IK won the regular season and also won the playoffs to claim their 11th Swedish title. IF Saab and SoIK Hellas were relegated.

== League table ==
Pos	Team	Pld	W	D	L	GF	GA	GD	Pts
1	Redbergslids IK	22	15	4	3	519	449	70	34
2	HK Drott	22	13	3	6	458	433	25	29
3	Ystads IF	22	12	3	7	492	450	42	27
4	IF Guif	22	12	3	7	474	461	13	27
5	LUGI	22	10	5	7	458	440	18	25
6	IFK Karlskrona	22	10	3	9	480	480	0	23
7	GF Kroppskultur	22	9	5	8	468	471	−3	23
8	Västra Frölunda IF	22	6	6	10	501	518	−17	18
9	HP Warta	22	7	4	11	471	498	−27	18
10	SoIK Hellas	22	6	3	13	479	519	−40	15
11	HK Cliff	22	5	3	14	443	492	−49	13
12	IF Saab	22	4	4	14	436	468	−32	12

== Playoffs ==
=== Semifinals ===
- Redbergslids IK–Ystads IF 24–20, 26–27, 26–20 (Redbergslids IK advance to the finals)
- GUIF–HK Drott 19–11, 17–21, 16–23 (HK Drott advance to the finals)

=== Finals ===
- Redbergslids IK–HK Drott 22–14, 18–16, 7–26, 20–18 (Redbergslids IK champions)
