= 1979–80 Allsvenskan (men's handball) =

Swedish handball season

Allsvenskan
- 1979–80

Tournament information
- Sport: Handball
- Teams: 12

Final positions
- Champions: Lugi HF (1st title)
- Runner-up: Ystads IF

The 1979–80 Allsvenskan was the 46th season of the top division of Swedish handball. 12 teams competed in the league. HK Drott won the regular season, but Lugi HF won the playoffs and claimed their first Swedish title. IF Guif and AIK were relegated.

== League table ==
Pos	Team	Pld	W	D	L	GF	GA	GD	Pts
1	HK Drott	22	16	3	3	515	473	40	35
2	Ystads IF	22	14	2	6	465	415	50	30
3	IK Heim	22	13	4	5	528	486	42	30
4	LUGI	22	10	2	10	506	459	47	28
5	Västra Frölunda IF	22	10	3	9	457	462	−5	23
6	Vikingarnas IF	22	10	2	10	467	468	−1	22
7	Redbergslids IK	22	10	1	11	424	415	9	21
8	SoIK Hellas	22	8	3	11	461	454	7	19
9	H 43 Lund	22	8	2	12	433	462	−29	18
10	IFK Kristianstad	22	7	2	13	450	525	−75	16
11	IF Guif	22	5	2	15	444	487	−43	12
12	AIK	22	4	2	16	417	459	−42	10

== Playoffs ==
=== Semifinals ===
- LUGI–HK Drott 15–18, 22–18, 24–22 (LUGI advance to the finals)
- Ystads IF–IK Heim 24–25, 24–22, 20–17 (Ystads IF advance to the finals)

=== Finals ===
- LUGI–Ystads IF 18–19, 20–19, 19–17 a.e.t. (LUGI champions)
