= 1981–82 Allsvenskan (men's handball) =

Swedish handball season

Allsvenskan
- 1981–82

Tournament information
- Sport: Handball
- Teams: 12

Final positions
- Champions: IK Heim (6th title)
- Runner-up: HK Drott

The 1981–82 Allsvenskan was the 48th season of the top division of Swedish handball. 12 teams competed in the league. HK Drott won the regular season, but IK Heim won the playoffs and claimed their sixth Swedish title. Redbergslids IK were relegated.

== League table ==
Pos	Team	Pld	W	D	L	GF	GA	GD	Pts
1	HK Drott	22	16	2	4	551	492	59	34
2	Ystads IF	22	14	4	4	516	475	41	32
3	IK Heim	22	15	1	6	550	503	47	31
4	Västra Frölunda IF	22	13	1	8	528	480	48	27
5	IFK Karlskrona	22	12	3	7	526	496	30	27
6	GF Kroppskultur	22	9	2	11	493	517	−24	20
7	HP Warta	22	9	2	11	442	475	−23	20
8	Vikingarnas IF	22	8	3	11	489	515	−26	19
9	LUGI	22	8	2	12	521	500	21	18
10	IF Guif	22	7	1	14	519	551	−32	15
11	H 43 Lund	22	7	0	15	503	554	−51	14
12	Redbergslids IK	22	2	3	17	455	535	−80	7

== Playoffs ==
=== Semifinals ===
- Ystads IF–IK Heim 23–25, 21–22 (IK Heim advance to the finals)
- HK Drott–Västra Frölunda IF 26–27, 20–19, 28–23 (HK Drott advance to the finals)

=== Finals ===
- HK Drott–IK Heim 22–30, 21–23 (IK Heim champions)
