= 1958–59 Allsvenskan (men's handball) =

Swedish handball league season

Allsvenskan
- 1958–59

Tournament information
- Sport: Handball
- Teams: 10

Final positions
- Champions: IK Heim (3rd title)
- Runner-up: Redbergslids IK

The 1958–59 Allsvenskan was the 25th season of the top division of Swedish handball. 10 teams competed in the league. IK Heim won the league and claimed their third Swedish title. Örebro SK and Lundens BK were relegated.

== League table ==
Pos	Team	Pld	W	D	L	GF	GA	GD	Pts
1	IK Heim	18	14	2	2	398	333	65	30
2	Redbergslids IK	18	10	3	5	382	353	29	23
3	IFK Malmö	18	10	1	7	382	377	5	21
4	IF Guif	18	8	3	7	393	383	10	19
5	H 43 Lund	18	9	1	8	336	343	−7	19
6	AIK	18	9	1	8	330	345	−15	19
7	Majornas IK	18	6	2	10	335	342	−7	14
8	IFK Karlskrona	18	5	3	10	309	334	−25	13
9	Örebro SK	18	5	2	11	372	397	−25	12
10	Lundens BK	18	5	0	13	343	373	−30	10
