= 1985–86 Allsvenskan (men's handball) =

Swedish handball season

Allsvenskan
- 1985–86

Tournament information
- Sport: Handball
- Teams: 12

Final positions
- Champions: Redbergslids IK (10th title)
- Runner-up: HP Warta

The 1985–86 Allsvenskan was the 52nd season of the top division of Swedish handball. 12 teams competed in the league. Redbergslids IK won the regular season and also won the playoffs to claim their tenth Swedish title. IFK Kristianstad and H 43 Lund were relegated.

== League table ==
Pos	Team	Pld	W	D	L	GF	GA	GD	Pts
1	Redbergslids IK	22	15	1	6	543	469	74	31
2	HK Drott	22	12	5	5	510	472	38	29
3	IF Guif	22	12	3	7	535	497	38	27
4	HP Warta	22	11	3	8	572	536	36	25
5	Ystads IF	22	9	5	8	512	512	0	23
6	GF Kroppskultur	22	10	3	9	551	555	−4	23
7	SoIK Hellas	22	7	7	8	493	515	−22	21
8	LUGI	22	10	0	12	487	503	−16	20
9	IFK Karlskrona	22	9	1	12	502	516	−14	19
10	Västra Frölunda IF	22	8	3	11	502	544	−42	19
11	H 43 Lund	22	7	0	15	480	520	−40	14
12	IFK Kristianstad	22	6	0	15	507	555	−48	13

== Playoffs ==
=== Semifinals ===
- HK Drott–Redbergslids IK 18–20, 21–19, 13–14 (Redbergslids IK advance to the finals)
- GUIF–HP Warta 23–29, 18–21 (HP Warta advance to the finals)

=== Finals ===
- Redbergslids IK–HP Warta 24–27, 27–21, 24–16, 31–19 (Redbergslids IK champions)
