= 1954–55 Allsvenskan (men's handball) =

Swedish handball season

Allsvenskan
- 1954–55

Tournament information
- Sport: Handball
- Teams: 10

Final positions
- Champions: IK Heim (4th title)
- Runner-up: IFK Kristianstad

The 1954–55 Allsvenskan was the 21st season of the top division of Swedish handball. 10 teams competed in the league. IK Heim won the league and claimed their second Swedish title. Redbergslids IK and Skövde AIK were relegated.

== League table ==
Pos	Team	Pld	W	D	L	GF	GA	GD	Pts
1	IK Heim	18	12	0	6	306	257	49	24
2	IFK Kristianstad	18	12	0	6	327	299	28	24
3	Örebro SK	18	12	0	6	264	255	9	24
4	AIK	18	8	4	6	312	300	12	20
5	IFK Malmö	18	8	2	8	331	306	25	18
6	Ystads IF	18	8	1	9	306	313	−7	17
7	Majornas IK	18	7	2	9	274	277	−3	16
8	IFK Karlskrona	18	7	1	10	270	296	−26	15
9	Redbergslids IK	18	5	1	12	243	274	−31	11
10	Skövde AIK	18	4	3	11	260	316	−56	11
