= 2000–01 Elitserien (men's handball) =

Swedish handball season

Elitserien
- 2000–01

Tournament information
- Sport: Handball
- Teams: 12

Final positions
- Champions: Redbergslids IK (19th title)
- Runner-up: IF Guif

The 2000–01 Elitserien was the 67th season of the top division of Swedish handball. 12 teams competed in the league. The league was split into an autumn league and a spring league. The eight highest placed teams in the autumn league qualified for the spring league, whereas the four lowest placed teams qualified for Allsvenskan along with the highest placed teams from the autumn season of Division I (the second level). The six highest placed teams in the spring season of Elitserien qualified for the quarterfinals, whereas the two lowest placed teams qualified for the preliminary round of the playoffs, along with the two highest placed teams of Allsvenskan. Redbergslids IK won the regular season and also won the playoffs to claim their 19th Swedish title.

== League tables ==
=== Autumn ===
Pos	Team	Pld	W	D	L	GF	GA	GD	Pts
1	Redbergslids IK	22	17	1	4	519	441	78	35
2	IF Guif	22	15	2	5	518	482	36	32
3	HK Drott	22	14	3	5	553	474	79	31
4	Alingsås HK	22	14	1	7	521	493	28	29
5	IFK Ystad HK	22	13	1	8	506	455	51	27
6	H 43 Lund	22	10	2	10	496	493	3	22
7	IFK Skövde	22	10	1	11	563	546	17	21
8	Lugi HF	22	10	0	12	470	499	−29	20
9	IK Sävehof	22	7	4	11	440	439	1	18
10	IFK Tumba	22	9	0	13	464	506	−42	18
11	HP Warta	22	3	3	16	448	550	−102	9
12	Önnereds HK	22	1	0	21	425	545	−120	2

=== Spring ===
Pos	Team	Pld	W	D	L	GF	GA	GD	Pts
1	Redbergslids IK	36	28	1	7	871	737	134	57
2	HK Drott	36	25	3	8	889	758	131	53
3	IF Guif	36	25	2	9	829	773	56	52
4	IFK Ystad HK	36	21	2	13	832	756	76	44
5	H 43 Lund	36	15	3	18	789	808	−19	33
6	Alingsås HK	36	15	3	18	800	824	−24	33
7	IFK Skövde	36	14	2	20	885	899	−14	30
8	Lugi HF	36	13	1	22	758	835	−77	27

== Playoffs ==
=== First round ===
- Tumba–Skövde 19–28
- Skövde–Tumba 22–26

Skövde won 50–45 on aggregate

- Sävehof–Lugi 29–19
- Lugi–Sävehof 20–13

Sävehof won 42–39 on aggregate

=== Quarterfinals ===
- Redbergslid–H 43 21–20
- H 43–Redbergslid 11–21

Redbergslid won series 2–0

- Drott–Alingsås 25–12
- Alingsås–Drott 20–25

Drott won series 2–0

- Guif–Sävehof 21–18
- Sävehof–Guif 18–20

Guif won series 2–0

- IFK Ystad–Skövde 22–24
- Skövde–IFK Ystad 28–26

Skövde won series 2–0

=== Semifinals ===
- Drott–Guif 24–28
- Guif–Drott 23–21

Guif won series 2–0

- Redbergslid–Skövde 25–27
- Skövde–Redbergslid 16–20
- Redbergslid–Skövde 27–24

Redbergslid won series 2–1

=== Finals ===
- Redbergslid–Guif 25–19
- Guif–Redbergslid 27–26
- Redbergslid–Guif 25–21

Redbergslid won series 2–1
