= 1977–78 Allsvenskan (men's handball) =

Swedish handball season

Allsvenskan
- 1977–78

Tournament information
- Sport: Handball
- Teams: 12

Final positions
- Champions: HK Drott (2nd title)
- Runner-up: Lugi HF

The 1977–78 Allsvenskan was the 44th season of the top division of Swedish handball. 12 teams competed in the league. Ystads IF won the regular season, but HK Drott won the playoffs and claimed their second Swedish title. IFK Lidingö and IF Saab were relegated.

== League table ==
Pos	Team	Pld	W	D	L	GF	GA	GD	Pts
1	Ystads IF	22	15	2	5	476	425	51	32
2	LUGI	22	15	1	6	482	437	45	31
3	HK Drott	22	14	2	6	547	490	57	30
4	IK Heim	22	12	2	8	524	483	41	26
5	Vikingarnas IF	22	11	4	7	512	480	32	26
6	IF Guif	22	11	2	9	497	442	25	24
7	SoIK Hellas	22	10	3	9	423	452	−29	23
8	IFK Kristianstad	22	7	4	11	431	459	−28	18
9	AIK	22	7	2	12	437	493	−56	17
10	HF Olympia	22	7	2	13	430	455	−25	16
11	IFK Lidingö	22	7	2	13	492	530	−38	16
12	IF Saab	22	1	3	18	457	532	−75	5

== Playoffs ==
=== Semifinals ===
- HK Drott−IK Heim 23−22, 29−21 (HK Drott advance to the finals)
- LUGI−Ystads IF 16−14, 17−16 (LUGI advance to the finals)

=== Finals ===
- HK Drott−LUGI 19−18, 23−18 (HK Drott champions)
