= 1961–62 Allsvenskan (men's handball) =

Handball season

Allsvenskan
- 1961–62

Tournament information
- Sport: Handball
- Teams: 10

Final positions
- Champions: IK Heim (5th title)
- Runner-up: Vikingarnas IF

The 1961–62 Allsvenskan was the 28th season of the top division of Swedish handball. 10 teams competed in the league. IK Heim won the league and claimed their fifth Swedish title. Örebro SK and Skövde AIK were relegated.

== League table ==
Pos	Team	Pld	W	D	L	GF	GA	GD	Pts
1	IK Heim	18	14	2	2	386	331	55	30
2	Vikingarnas IF	18	14	1	3	444	370	74	29
3	LUGI	18	13	1	4	409	341	68	27
4	SoIK Hellas	18	8	1	9	313	312	21	17
5	Redbergslids IK	18	7	3	8	297	314	−17	17
6	H 43 Lund	18	6	1	11	353	387	−34	13
7	IF Guif	18	6	1	11	364	399	−35	13
8	Majornas IK	18	6	1	11	336	378	−42	13
9	Örebro SK	18	6	0	12	338	370	−32	12
10	Skövde AIK	18	4	1	13	315	373	−58	9
