= 1996–97 Elitserien (men's handball) =

Swedish handball season

Elitserien
- 1996–97

Tournament information
- Sport: Handball
- Teams: 12

Final positions
- Champions: Redbergslids IK (16th title)
- Runner-up: IF Guif

The 1996–97 Elitserien was the 63rd season of the top division of Swedish handball. 12 teams competed in the league. The league was split into an autumn league and a spring league. The eight highest placed teams in the autumn league qualified for the spring league. HK Drott won the regular season, but Redbergslids IK won the playoffs and claimed their 16th Swedish title.

== League tables ==
=== Autumn ===
Pos	Team	Pld	W	D	L	GF	GA	GD	Pts
1	HK Drott	16	13	1	2	465	374	91	27
2	IF Guif	16	11	1	4	515	421	94	23
3	Redbergslids IK	16	10	2	4	468	380	88	22
4	IFK Kristianstad	16	9	3	4	425	407	18	21
5	IFK Skövde	16	8	1	7	411	391	20	17
6	IK Sävehof	16	7	1	8	400	403	−3	15
7	LUGI HF	16	7	0	9	399	408	−9	14
8	GF Kroppskultur	16	7	0	9	408	460	−52	14
9	Polisen/Söder	16	6	0	10	410	410	0	12
10	HF Linköpings Lejon	16	5	0	11	392	461	−69	10
11	Stavstens IF	16	4	1	11	400	486	−86	9
12	Lysekils HK	16	4	0	12	368	460	−92	8

=== Spring ===
Pos	Team	Pld	W	D	L	GF	GA	GD	Pts
1	HK Drott	30	23	1	6	850	719	131	47
2	Redbergslids IK	30	20	3	7	874	721	153	43
3	IFK Skövde	30	16	3	11	782	736	46	35
4	IF Guif	30	16	1	13	884	811	73	33
5	IFK Kristianstad	30	14	3	13	768	792	−24	31
6	LUGI HF	30	14	0	16	771	774	−3	28
7	IK Sävehof	30	13	2	15	769	777	−8	28
8	GF Kroppskultur	30	10	0	20	760	882	−122	20

== Playoffs ==
=== Quarterfinals ===
- IFK Skövde–LUGI HF 30–32
- LUGI HF–IFK Skövde 26–16

Lugi HF won series 2–0

- IF Guif–IFK Kristianstad 25–23
- IFK Kristianstad–IF Guif 28–35

IF Guif won series 2–0

=== Semifinals ===
- HK Drott–IF Guif 31–33
- IF Guif–HK Drott 31–30

IF Guif won series 2–0

- Redbergslids IK–LUGI HF 30–22
- LUGI HF–Redbergslids IK 18–24

Redbergslids IK won series 2–0

=== Finals ===
- Redbergslids IK–IF Guif 27–21
- IF Guif–Redbergslids IK 19–26
- Redbergslids IK–IF Guif 35–23

Redbergslids IK won series 3–0
