= 1982–83 Allsvenskan (men's handball) =

Swedish handball season

Allsvenskan
- 1982–83

Tournament information
- Sport: Handball
- Teams: 12

Final positions
- Champions: IK Heim (7th title)
- Runner-up: Västra Frölunda IF

The 1982–83 Allsvenskan was the 49th season of the top division of Swedish handball. 12 teams competed in the league. IK Heim won the regular season and also won the playoffs to claim their seventh Swedish title. Vikingarnas IF were relegated.

== League table ==
Pos	Team	Pld	W	D	L	GF	GA	GD	Pts
1	IK Heim	22	15	3	4	556	497	59	33
2	Ystads IF	22	13	1	8	500	471	29	27
3	IFK Karlskrona	22	12	2	8	509	489	20	26
4	Västra Frölunda IF	22	12	0	10	508	477	31	24
5	GF Kroppskultur	22	11	0	11	518	527	−9	22
6	HK Drott	22	9	3	10	485	483	2	21
7	LUGI	22	10	1	11	487	501	−14	21
8	HP Warta	22	9	2	11	429	441	−12	20
9	IF Guif	22	10	0	12	507	532	−25	20
10	H 43 Lund	22	8	2	12	489	515	−26	18
11	Visby IF Gute	22	7	3	12	514	540	−26	17
12	Vikingarnas IF	22	6	3	13	474	503	−29	15

== Playoffs ==
=== Semifinals ===
- Västra Frölunda–Ystads IF 21–22, 25–21, 18–15 (Västra Frölunda IF advance to the finals)
- IK Heim–IFK Karlskrona 22–18, 22–24, 19–17 (IK Heim advance to the finals)

=== Finals ===
- IK Heim–Västra Frölunda IF 23–18, 20–16 (IK Heim champions)
