= 1976–77 Allsvenskan (men's handball) =

Swedish handball season

Allsvenskan
- 1976–77

Tournament information
- Sport: Handball
- Teams: 12

Final positions
- Champions: SoIK Hellas (7th title)
- Runner-up: IK Heim

The 1976–77 Allsvenskan was the 43rd season of the top division of Swedish handball. 12 teams competed in the league. IK Heim won the regular season, but SoIK Hellas won the playoffs and claimed their seventh Swedish title. IFK Malmö and Västra Frölunda IF were relegated.

== League table ==
Pos	Team	Pld	W	D	L	GF	GA	GD	Pts
1	SoIK Hellas	22	14	2	6	449	416	33	30
2	LUGI	22	12	3	7	463	417	46	27
3	IK Heim	22	11	3	8	471	443	28	25
4	IF Guif	22	11	3	8	460	438	22	25
5	Ystads IF	22	9	6	7	450	420	30	24
6	IFK Kristianstad	22	11	2	9	451	439	12	24
7	HK Drott	22	11	2	9	461	455	6	24
8	IFK Lidingö	22	9	3	10	442	347	−5	21
9	Vikingarnas IF	22	9	2	11	438	466	−28	20
10	IF Saab	22	7	5	10	437	461	−24	19
11	IFK Malmö	22	7	3	12	400	434	−34	17
12	Västra Frölunda IF	22	3	2	17	354	440	−86	8

== Playoffs ==
=== Semifinals ===
- SoIK Hellas−GUIF 20−23, 24−18, 23−17 (SoIK Hellas advance to the finals)
- IK Heim−LUGI 19−17, 21−14 (IK Heim advance to the finals)

=== Finals ===
- SoIK Hellas−IK Heim 30−16, 19−17 (SoIK Hellas champions)
