= 1980–81 Allsvenskan (men's handball) =

Swedish handball season

Allsvenskan
- 1980–81

Tournament information
- Sport: Handball
- Teams: 12

Final positions
- Champions: Vikingarnas IF (3rd title)
- Runner-up: Ystads IF

The 1980–81 Allsvenskan was the 47th season of the top division of Swedish handball. 12 teams competed in the league. Ystads IF won the regular season, but Vikingarnas IF won the playoffs and claimed their third Swedish title. SoIK Hellas, Visby IF Gute and IFK Kristianstad were relegated.

== League table ==
Pos	Team	Pld	W	D	L	GF	GA	GD	Pts
1	Ystads IF	22	15	3	4	461	398	63	33
2	HP Warta	22	13	2	7	418	391	25	28
3	Vikingarnas IF	22	13	1	8	511	476	35	27
4	LUGI	22	12	3	7	471	452	19	27
5	HK Drott	22	11	4	7	487	465	22	26
6	IK Heim	22	10	4	8	481	477	4	24
7	Västra Frölunda IF	22	9	3	10	459	452	7	21
8	H 43 Lund	22	8	3	11	476	482	−6	19
9	Redbergslids IK	22	8	1	13	390	428	−38	17
10	SoIK Hellas	22	7	2	13	413	468	−55	16
11	Visby IF Gute	22	6	2	14	422	461	−39	14
12	IFK Kristianstad	22	5	2	15	483	422	−39	12

== Playoffs ==
=== Semifinals ===
- Ystads IF–HP Warta 19–19, 20–16 (Ystads IF advance to the finals)
- Vikingarnas IF–LUGI 23–18, 19–22, 18–17 a.e.t. (Vikingarnas IF advance to the finals)

=== Finals ===
- Vikingarnas IF–Ystads IF 21–15, 20–22, 26–22 (Vikingarnas IF champions)
