= 1962–63 Allsvenskan (men's handball) =

Swedish handball season

Allsvenskan
- 1962–63

Tournament information
- Sport: Handball
- Teams: 10

Final positions
- Champions: Redbergslids IK (6th title)
- Runner-up: IF Hallby

The 1962–63 Allsvenskan was the 29th season of the top division of Swedish handball. 10 teams competed in the league. Redbergslids IK won the league and claimed their sixth Swedish title. LUGI and IF Guif were relegated.

== League table ==
Pos	Team	Pld	W	D	L	GF	GA	GD	Pts
1	Redbergslids IK	18	13	3	2	394	310	84	29
2	IF Hallby	18	12	0	6	347	335	12	24
3	IK Heim	18	7	4	7	366	345	21	18
4	Vikingarnas IF	18	9	0	9	432	427	5	18
5	H 43 Lund	18	8	1	9	371	377	−6	17
6	SoIK Hellas	18	7	3	8	323	340	−17	17
7	HK Drott	18	6	4	8	346	355	−9	16
8	Majornas IK	18	6	3	9	376	398	−22	15
9	LUGI	18	5	5	8	347	375	−28	15
10	IF Guif	18	5	1	12	402	442	−40	11
