= 1978–79 Allsvenskan (men's handball) =

Swedish handball season

Allsvenskan
- 1978–79

Tournament information
- Sport: Handball
- Teams: 12

Final positions
- Champions: HK Drott (3rd title)
- Runner-up: Ystads IF

The 1978–79 Allsvenskan was the 45th season of the top division of Swedish handball. 12 teams competed in the league. IK Heim won the regular season, but HK Drott won the playoffs and claimed their third Swedish title. HF Olympia and Kiruna AIF were relegated.

== League table ==
| Pos | Team | Pld | W | D | L | GF | GA | GD | Pts |
|---|---|---|---|---|---|---|---|---|---|
| 1 | IK Heim | 22 | 8 | 0 | 4 | 555 | 464 | 91 | 36 |
| 2 | Ystads IF | 22 | 15 | 2 | 5 | 500 | 408 | 92 | 32 |
| 3 | LUGI | 22 | 14 | 2 | 6 | 478 | 423 | 55 | 30 |
| 4 | HK Drott | 22 | 14 | 1 | 7 | 530 | 466 | 64 | 29 |
| 5 | IFK Kristianstad | 22 | 14 | 1 | 7 | 501 | 442 | 59 | 29 |
| 6 | Redbergslids IK | 22 | 11 | 1 | 10 | 452 | 457 | −5 | 23 |
| 7 | Vikingarnas IF | 22 | 9 | 3 | 10 | 448 | 454 | −6 | 21 |
| 8 | SoIK Hellas | 22 | 9 | 1 | 12 | 433 | 453 | −20 | 19 |
| 9 | IF Guif | 22 | 9 | 1 | 12 | 466 | 522 | −56 | 19 |
| 10 | AIK | 22 | 4 | 2 | 16 | 422 | 500 | −78 | 10 |
| 11 | HF Olympia | 22 | 2 | 4 | 16 | 426 | 487 | −61 | 8 |
| 12 | Kiruna AIF | 22 | 2 | 4 | 16 | 416 | 551 | −135 | 8 |

== Playoffs ==
=== Semifinals ===
- HK Drott–IK Heim 23–21, 24–25, 18–16 (HK Drott advance to the finals)
- LUGI–Ystads IF 12–12, 18–18, 15–16 a.e.t. (Ystads IF advance to the finals)

=== Finals ===
- HK Drott–Ystads IF 17–16, 19–19 (HK Drott champions)
