= 1957–58 Allsvenskan (men's handball) =

Swedish handball season

Allsvenskan
- 1957–58

Tournament information
- Sport: Handball
- Teams: 10

Final positions
- Champions: Redbergslids IK (5th title)
- Runner-up: Örebro SK

The 1957–58 Allsvenskan was the 24th season of the top division of Swedish handball. 10 teams competed in the league. Redbergslids IK won the league and claimed their fifth Swedish title. IFK Kristianstad and IFK Borås were relegated.

== League table ==
Pos	Team	Pld	W	D	L	GF	GA	GD	Pts
1	Redbergslids IK	18	15	1	2	393	304	89	31
2	Örebro SK	18	14	0	4	374	306	68	28
3	IK Heim	18	11	1	6	376	347	29	23
4	IFK Malmö	18	10	2	6	389	367	22	22
5	H 43	18	10	1	7	330	342	−12	21
6	AIK	18	7	3	8	355	357	−2	17
7	IFK Karlskrona	18	6	1	11	307	336	−29	13
8	Lundens BK	18	5	2	11	361	374	−13	12
9	IFK Kristianstad	18	4	1	13	354	388	−34	9
10	IFK Borås	18	2	0	6	302	420	−118	4
