= 1997–98 Elitserien (men's handball) =

Swedish handball season

Elitserien
- 1996–97

Tournament information
- Sport: Handball
- Teams: 12

Final positions
- Champions: Redbergslids IK (17th title)
- Runner-up: HK Drott

The 1997–98 Elitserien was the 64th season of the top division of Swedish handball. 12 teams competed in the league. The league was split into an autumn league and a spring league. The eight highest placed teams in the autumn league qualified for the spring league. Redbergslids IK won the regular season and also won the playoffs to claim their 17th Swedish title.

== League tables ==
=== Autumn ===
Pos	Team	Pld	W	D	L	GF	GA	GD	Pts
1	Redbergslids IK	16	16	0	0	518	375	143	32
2	Lugi HF	16	12	0	4	488	424	64	24
3	IF Guif	16	11	1	4	497	424	73	23
4	IFK Skövde	16	10	1	5	421	394	27	21
5	HK Drott	16	9	2	5	463	420	43	20
6	IK Sävehof	16	7	1	8	429	424	5	15
7	IFK Ystad	16	6	2	8	444	445	−1	14
8	HP Warta	16	7	0	9	424	425	−1	14
9	Polisen/Söder	16	6	0	10	424	439	−15	12
10	GF Kroppskultur	16	4	3	9	402	409	−7	11
11	IFK Kristianstad	16	2	1	13	405	520	−115	5
12	HF Linköpings Lejon	16	0	1	15	305	512	−207	1

=== Spring ===
Pos	Team	Pld	W	D	L	GF	GA	GD	Pts
1	Redbergslids IK	30	29	0	1	939	688	251	58
2	Lugi HF	30	18	2	10	852	825	27	38
3	HK Drott	30	16	4	10	844	792	52	36
4	IFK Skövde	30	16	2	12	780	761	19	34
5	IF Guif	30	15	3	12	863	820	43	33
6	HP Warta	30	15	0	15	804	756	48	30
7	IK Sävehof	30	11	3	16	787	806	−19	25
8	IFK Ystad	30	9	3	18	808	888	−80	21

== Playoffs ==
=== Quarterfinals ===
- HK Drott–HP Warta 21–17
- HP Warta–HK Drott 25–24
- HK Drott–HP Warta 26–17

HK Drott won series 2–1

- IFK Skövde–Guif 26–27
- Guif–IFK Skövde 33–34
- IFK Skövde–Guif 40–24

IFK Skövde won series 2–1

=== Semifinals ===
- Redbergslids IK–IFK Skövde 29–14
- IFK Skövde–Redbergslids IK 26–30

Redbergslids IK won series 2–0

- Lugi-HK Drott 25–31
- HK Drott-Lugi 33–27

HK Drott won series 2–0

=== Finals ===
- Redbergslids IK–HK Drott 33–19
- HK Drott–Redbergslids IK 25–22
- Redbergslids IK–HK Drott 29–17
- HK Drott–Redbergslids IK 24–25

Redbergslids IK won series 3–1
