= 1971–72 Allsvenskan (men's handball) =

Swedish handball season

Allsvenskan
- 1971–72

Tournament information
- Sport: Handball
- Teams: 10

Final positions
- Champions: SoIK Hellas (6th title)
- Runner-up: HK Drott

The 1971–72 Allsvenskan was the 38th season of the top division of Swedish handball. 10 teams competed in the league. SoIK Hellas won the regular season and also won the playoffs to claim their sixth Swedish title. Vikingarnas IF and Ystads IF were relegated.

== League table ==
| Pos | Team | Pld | W | D | L | GF | GA | GD | Pts |
|---|---|---|---|---|---|---|---|---|---|
| 1 | SoIK Hellas | 18 | 14 | 1 | 3 | 298 | 238 | 60 | 29 |
| 2 | IF Saab | 18 | 11 | 1 | 6 | 357 | 336 | 21 | 23 |
| 3 | HK Drott | 18 | 10 | 1 | 7 | 336 | 292 | 44 | 21 |
| 4 | IFK Kristianstad | 18 | 10 | 1 | 7 | 310 | 289 | 21 | 21 |
| 5 | Redbergslids IK | 18 | 9 | 0 | 9 | 290 | 281 | 9 | 18 |
| 6 | Västra Frölunda IF | 18 | 8 | 1 | 9 | 260 | 271 | −11 | 17 |
| 7 | IF Guif | 18 | 7 | 0 | 11 | 242 | 287 | −45 | 14 |
| 8 | LUGI | 18 | 6 | 1 | 11 | 309 | 333 | −24 | 13 |
| 9 | Vikingarnas IF | 18 | 5 | 3 | 10 | 307 | 337 | −30 | 13 |
| 10 | Ystads IF | 18 | 5 | 1 | 12 | 256 | 301 | −45 | 11 |

== Playoffs ==
=== Semifinals ===
- SoIK Hellas–IFK Kristianstad 14–19, 9–5, 22–11 (SoIK Hellas advance to the finals)
- HK Drott–IFK Saab 17–16, 16–19, 16–14 (HK Drott advance to the finals)

=== Finals ===
- SoIK Hellas–HK Drott 21–13, 10–14, 14–11 (SoIK Hellas champions)
