= 1955–56 Allsvenskan (men's handball) =

Swedish handball season

Allsvenskan
- 1955–56

Tournament information
- Sport: Handball
- Teams: 10

Final positions
- Champions: Örebro SK (1st title)
- Runner-up: IFK Karlskrona

The 1955–56 Allsvenskan was the 22nd season of the top division of Swedish handball. 10 teams competed in the league. Örebro SK won the league and claimed their first Swedish title. IK Baltichov and Västerås IK were relegated.

== League table ==
| Pos | Team | Pld | W | D | L | GF | GA | GD | Pts |
|---|---|---|---|---|---|---|---|---|---|
| 1 | Örebro SK | 18 | 15 | 0 | 3 | 329 | 237 | 92 | 30 |
| 2 | IFK Karlskrona | 18 | 14 | 0 | 4 | 330 | 274 | 56 | 28 |
| 3 | Ystads IF | 18 | 13 | 1 | 4 | 317 | 269 | 48 | 27 |
| 4 | IFK Kristianstad | 18 | 12 | 0 | 6 | 394 | 342 | 52 | 24 |
| 5 | Majornas IK | 18 | 8 | 2 | 8 | 321 | 303 | 18 | 18 |
| 6 | IK Heim | 18 | 8 | 2 | 8 | 314 | 314 | 0 | 18 |
| 7 | IFK Malmö | 18 | 7 | 1 | 10 | 377 | 359 | 18 | 15 |
| 8 | AIK | 18 | 5 | 3 | 10 | 333 | 357 | −23 | 13 |
| 9 | IK Baltichov | 18 | 2 | 1 | 15 | 259 | 379 | −120 | 5 |
| 10 | Västerås IK | 18 | 0 | 2 | 16 | 284 | 425 | −141 | 2 |
