= 1963–64 Allsvenskan (men's handball) =

Swedish handball season

Allsvenskan
- 1963–64

Tournament information
- Sport: Handball
- Teams: 10

Final positions
- Champions: Redbergslids IK (7th title)
- Runner-up: Vikingarnas IF

The 1963–64 Allsvenskan was the 30th season of the top division of Swedish handball. 10 teams competed in the league. Redbergslids IK won the league and claimed their seventh Swedish title. HK Drott and Majornas IK were relegated.

== League table ==
| Pos | Team | Pld | W | D | L | GF | GA | GD | Pts |
|---|---|---|---|---|---|---|---|---|---|
| 1 | Redbergslids IK | 18 | 16 | 0 | 2 | 397 | 314 | 83 | 32 |
| 2 | Vikingarnas IF | 18 | 12 | 0 | 6 | 367 | 341 | 26 | 24 |
| 3 | IF Hallby | 18 | 10 | 0 | 8 | 387 | 353 | 34 | 20 |
| 4 | H 43 Lund | 18 | 10 | 0 | 8 | 405 | 383 | 22 | 20 |
| 5 | IK Tord | 18 | 9 | 1 | 8 | 303 | 315 | −12 | 19 |
| 6 | SoIK Hellas | 18 | 8 | 1 | 9 | 337 | 333 | 4 | 17 |
| 7 | IK Heim | 18 | 7 | 2 | 9 | 354 | 354 | 0 | 16 |
| 8 | IF Saab | 18 | 7 | 2 | 9 | 321 | 336 | −15 | 16 |
| 9 | HK Drott | 18 | 5 | 2 | 11 | 310 | 354 | −44 | 12 |
| 10 | Majornas IK | 18 | 2 | 0 | 16 | 332 | 430 | −98 | 4 |
