= 1956–57 Allsvenskan (men's handball) =

Swedish handball season

Allsvenskan
- 1956–57

Tournament information
- Sport: Handball
- Teams: 10

Final positions
- Champions: Örebro SK (2nd title)
- Runner-up: IFK Malmö

The 1956–57 Allsvenskan was the 23rd season of the top division of Swedish handball. 10 teams competed in the league. Örebro SK won the league and claimed their second Swedish title. Majornas IK and Ystads IF were relegated.

== League table ==
Pos	Team	Pld	W	D	L	GF	GA	GD	Pts
1	Örebro SK	18	13	0	5	335	282	53	26
2	IFK Malmö	18	12	1	5	398	332	66	25
3	IK Heim	18	10	1	7	367	327	40	21
4	IFK Kristianstad	18	10	1	7	375	374	1	21
5	IFK Karlskrona	18	9	2	7	352	354	−2	20
6	AIK	18	8	1	9	316	313	3	17
7	IFK Borås	18	8	0	10	313	377	−64	16
8	H 43 Lund	18	7	1	10	333	347	−14	15
9	Majornas IK	18	6	0	12	308	322	−14	12
10	Ystads IF	18	3	1	14	336	405	−69	7
