= 1987–88 Allsvenskan (men's handball) =

Swedish handball season

Allsvenskan
- 1987–88

Tournament information
- Sport: Handball
- Teams: 12

Final positions
- Champions: HK Drott (5th title)
- Runner-up: Redbergslids IK

The 1987–88 Allsvenskan was the 54th season of the top division of Swedish handball. 12 teams competed in the league. Redbergslids IK won the regular season but HK Drott won the playoffs and claimed their fifth Swedish title. HP Warta and Västra Frölunda IF were relegated.

== League table ==
Pos	Team	Pld	W	D	L	GF	GA	GD	Pts
1	Redbergslids IK	22	17	1	4	532	449	83	35
2	HK Drott	22	13	2	7	455	415	40	28
3	Ystads IF	22	13	2	7	489	475	14	28
4	HK Cliff	22	11	5	6	484	456	28	27
5	IF Guif	22	11	2	9	466	451	15	24
6	IK Sävehof	22	11	1	10	450	477	3	23
7	LUGI	22	10	2	10	462	455	7	22
8	Katrineholms AIK	22	10	1	11	489	511	−22	21
9	GF Kroppskultur	22	8	2	12	474	473	1	18
10	Västra Frölunda IF	22	6	4	12	486	452	−36	16
11	IFK Karlskrona	22	5	1	16	452	480	−28	11
12	HP Warta	22	4	3	15	428	533	−105	11

== Playoffs ==
=== Semifinals ===
- Redbergslids IK–Ystads IF 26–20, 21–12 (Redbergslids IK won series 2–0)
- HK Drott–HK Cliff 22–21, 22–14 (HK Drott won series 2–0)

=== Finals ===
- HK Drott–Redbergslids IK 22–19, 25–24 (p), 13–12 (HK Drott won series 3–0)
