= 1970–71 Allsvenskan (men's handball) =

Swedish handball season

Allsvenskan
- 1970–71

Tournament information
- Sport: Handball
- Teams: 10

Final positions
- Champions: SoIK Hellas (5th title)
- Runner-up: Västra Frölunda IF

The 1970–71 Allsvenskan was the 37th season of the top division of Swedish handball. 10 teams competed in the league. SoIK Hellas won the regular season and also won the playoffs to claim their fifth Swedish title. IFK Malmö and IF Start were relegated.

== League table ==
Pos	Team	Pld	W	D	L	GF	GA	GD	Pts
1	SoIK Hellas	18	13	1	4	304	263	41	27
2	IF Saab	18	10	1	7	335	307	28	21
3	Västra Frölunda IF	18	9	3	6	309	291	18	21
4	Redbergslids IK	18	9	2	7	297	289	8	20
5	HK Drott	18	6	7	5	305	300	5	19
6	IFK Kristianstad	18	7	4	7	284	295	−11	18
7	Ystads IF	18	7	2	9	294	331	−37	16
8	IF Guif	18	6	3	9	213	218	−5	15
9	IFK Malmö	18	7	1	10	302	310	−8	15
10	IF Start	18	3	2	13	312	351	−39	8

== Playoffs ==
=== Semifinals ===
- SoIK Hellas–Redbergslids IK 15–10, 16–13 (SoIK Hellas advance to the finals)
- Västra Frölunda IF–IF Saab 16–17, 19–13 (Västra Frölunda IF advance to the finals)

=== Finals ===
- SoIK Hellas–Västra Frölunda IF 13–10, 15–12 (SoIK Hellas champions)
