= 1998–99 Elitserien (men's handball) =

Swedish handball season

Elitserien
- 1998–99

Tournament information
- Sport: Handball
- Teams: 12

Final positions
- Champions: HK Drott (9th title)
- Runner-up: Redbergslids IK

The 1998–99 Elitserien was the 65th season of the top division of Swedish handball. HK Drott won the regular season and also won the playoffs to claim their ninth Swedish title.

== Format ==
12 teams competed in the league. The league was split into an autumn league and a spring league. The eight highest placed teams in the autumn league qualified for the spring league, whereas the four lowest placed teams qualified for Allsvenskan along with the highest placed teams from the autumn season of Division I (the second level). The six highest placed teams in the spring season of Elitserien qualified for the quarterfinals, whereas the two lowest placed teams qualified for the preliminary round of the playoffs, along with the two highest placed teams of Allsvenskan.

== League tables ==
=== Autumn ===
Pos	Team	Pld	W	D	L	GF	GA	GD	Pts
1	HK Drott	16	13	1	2	484	380	104	27
2	Redbergslids IK	16	11	3	2	428	337	91	25
3	Alingsås HK	16	9	2	5	390	370	20	20
4	IF Guif	16	9	1	6	396	388	8	19
5	IK Sävehof	16	9	1	6	381	391	−10	19
6	IFK Skövde	16	8	2	6	402	390	12	18
7	IFK Ystad	16	6	3	7	360	404	−44	15
8	GF Kroppskultur	16	6	1	9	359	384	−25	13
9	HP Warta	16	6	0	10	389	410	−21	12
10	LUGI HF	16	4	2	10	411	421	−10	10
11	IFK Tumba	16	4	0	12	356	410	−54	8
12	Polisen/Söder	16	3	0	13	354	425	−71	6

=== Spring ===
Pos	Team	Pld	W	D	L	GF	GA	GD	Pts
1	HK Drott	30	23	1	6	839	703	136	47
2	Redbergslids IK	30	21	4	5	769	640	129	46
3	IFK Skövde	30	17	3	10	752	709	43	37
4	IF Guif	30	15	2	13	747	741	6	32
5	Alingsås HK	30	14	3	13	724	696	28	31
6	GF Kroppskultur	30	12	1	17	652	706	−54	25
7	IK Sävehof	30	12	1	17	678	744	−66	25
8	IFK Ystad	30	11	3	16	666	732	−66	25

== Playoffs ==
=== First round ===
- IFK Ystad–LUGI HF 36–22
- LUGI HF–IFK Ystad 33–29

IFK Ystad won 65–55 on aggregate

- GIK Wasaiterna–IK Sävehof 26–22
- IK Sävehof–GIK Wasaiterna 25–23

GIK Wasaiterna won 49–27 on aggregate

=== Quarterfinals ===
- HK Drott–IFK Ystad 27–24
- IFK Ystad–HK Drott 26–21
- HK Drott–IFK Ystad 28–25

HK Drott won series 2–1

- Redbergslids IK–GF Kroppskultur 34–9
- GF Kroppskultur–Redbergslids IK 14–21

Redbergslids IK won series 2–0

- IFK Skövde–GIK Wasaiterna 32–19
- GIK Wasaiterna–IFK Skövde 19–31

IFK Skövde won series 2–0

- IF Guif–Alingsås HK 30–32
- Alingsås HK–IF Guif 26–23

Alingsås HK won series 2–0

=== Semifinals ===
- HK Drott–Alingsås HK 28–21
- Alingsås HK–HK Drott 24–28

HK Drott won series 2–0

- Redbergslids IK–IFK Skövde 18–16
- IFK Skövde–Redbergslids IK 23–26

Redbergslids IK won series 2–0

=== Finals ===
- HK Drott–Redbergslids IK 30–19
- Redbergslids IK–HK Drott 32–18
- HK Drott–Redbergslids IK 27–18
- Redbergslids IK–HK Drott 21–23

HK Drott won series 3–1
