= 1952–53 Allsvenskan (men's handball) =

Swedish handball season

Allsvenskan
- 1952–53

Tournament information
- Sport: Handball
- Teams: 10

Final positions
- Champions: IFK Kristianstad (4th title)
- Runner-up: Redbergslids IK

The 1952–53 Allsvenskan was the 19th season of the top division of Swedish handball. It was the first season where the title of Swedish Champions was awarded to the winner of the league, with Svenska mästerskapet being discontinued after the previous season. 10 teams competed in the league. IFK Kristianstad won the league and claimed their fourth Swedish title. Karlstads BIK and Näsby IF were relegated.

== League table ==
Pos	Team	Pld	W	D	L	GF	GA	GD	Pts
1	IFK Kristianstad	18	13	1	4	268	213	55	27
2	Redbergslids IK	18	10	3	5	221	185	36	23
3	Örebro SK	18	9	5	4	228	193	35	23
4	IK Heim	18	7	4	7	201	214	−13	18
5	IFK Karlskrona	18	7	3	8	224	236	8	17
6	AIK	18	8	0	10	236	222	14	16
7	Majornas IK	18	8	0	10	246	239	7	16
8	IFK Borås	18	6	4	8	228	251	−23	16
9	Karlstads BIK	18	7	2	9	245	274	−29	16
10	Näsby IF	18	3	2	13	190	280	−90	8
