= 2020–21 Handbollsligan =

Handbollsligan
- 2020–21

Tournament information
- Sport: Handball
- Teams: 15

Final positions
- Champions: IK Sävehof (7th title)
- Runner-up: IFK Skövde

The 2020–21 Handbollsligan was the 87th season of the top division of Swedish handball. 15 teams competed in the league. The eight highest placed teams qualified for the playoffs, whereas teams 11–13 had to play relegation playoffs against teams from the second division, and teams 14 and 15 were relegated automatically. IK Sävehof won the regular season and also won the playoffs to claim their seventh Swedish title.

== League table ==
Pos	Team	Pld	W	D	L	GF	GA	GD	Pts
1	IK Sävehof	28	19	4	5	808	701	107	42
2	Ystads IF HF	28	19	2	7	830	767	63	40
3	HK Malmö	28	19	2	7	765	706	59	40
4	IFK Skövde HK	28	15	6	7	762	692	70	36
5	Alingsås HK	28	16	3	9	786	758	28	35
6	IFK Kristianstad	28	17	0	11	831	739	92	34
7	Lugi HF	28	14	3	11	821	784	37	31
8	Eskilstuna Guif	28	13	1	14	749	785	−36	27
9	IF Hallby	28	11	3	14	779	798	−19	25
10	IFK Ystad HK	28	10	3	15	709	760	−51	23
11	Önnereds HK	28	8	3	17	734	795	−61	19
12	Redbergslids IK	28	8	2	18	746	800	−54	18
13	HK Aranäs	28	8	2	18	699	758	−59	18
14	HK Varberg	28	8	1	19	742	867	−125	17
15	OV Helsingborg HK	28	7	1	20	777	828	−51	15

== Playoffs bracket ==
Quarterfinals
1	IK Sävehof	32	31*	28
8	Eskilstuna Guif	21	28	27
2	Ystads IF HF	31	24	23	27
7	Lugi HF	34	15	25	30
4	IFK Skövde	26	27	22	26
5	Alingsås HK	24	22	24	21
3	HK Malmö	22	28	29	28
6	IFK Kristianstad	32	31	27	34

Semifinals
1	IK Sävehof	34	34	40
7	Lugi HF	28	22	27
4	IFK Skövde	25	33	23
6	IFK Kristianstad	22	27	22

Final
1	IK Sävehof	38*	32	30
4	IFK Skövde	37	22	27

- An asterisk (*) denotes result after extra time
