= KFUM Borås =

Swedish sport club

KFUM Borås is a Swedish multi-sport club based in Borås. The club's basketball team, known as Borås Basket, play in the Swedish top division Basketligan in 2017–18. KFUM is a translation of the English language YMCA.

The club's handball team were promoted to the highest league, Allsvenskan, in 1964. The team that won promotion mainly consisted of local players. A major reason for their success was the physical shape of the players. Coach Arne Eriksson, a former Swedish military pentathlon champion, made the players regularly practise long-distance running. This gave the team an advantage over technically more skilled opponents. In their debut season in the top-flight, Borås finished second, a single point behind champions Redbergslids IK. They did this with largely the same team that had won promotion. They had an average attendance around 2400 during the season. However, the club was relegated in the following season and never returned to the top division. During this time, the team played their home matches in Boråshallen, the same arena that is currently used by the basketball team. In 1984, KFUM Borås's handball department merged with three other clubs to form Borås HK 84. In 2017, Borås HK 84 discontinued its men's first team.

The club used to have a tennis department. In 2012 it merged with two other clubs and the organisation that operates the courts to form Elfsborg Tennis.
