= Växjö HF =

Swedish handball club

- Full name: Växjö handbollsförening
- Short name: VHF
- Founded: 1972; 54 years ago
- Arena: GBJ Bygg Arena, Växjö
- Capacity: 500
- Head coach: Pär Söderqvist
- League: 2. Division
- Club colours
Home	Away

Växjö HF is a handball club in Växjö, Sweden, established 1972 out of Växjö BK. The men's team played three seasons in the Swedish top division during the early 1990s.

The men's junior team won the Swedish national championship in the year 2000, while the girls' team won the Swedish national championship of 2003. It is the mother club of Swedish player Jonas Källman.

Location of Växjö HF

== Kits ==
HOME
2014–15	2018–19

AWAY
2018–19	2020–
