= KFUM Örebro =

KFUM Örebro is an YMCA association in Örebro in Sweden, established in 1890. In 1990 the club won the Swedish women's juniors national volleyball championship, and between 1996 and 2001 the club won the Swedish national women's volleyball championship during six seasons in a row.

The men's floorball team played in the Swedish top division during the 1990s.
