= Djurgårdens IF Handboll =

Swedish handball club

Djurgårdens IF HF
- Full name: Djurgårdens IF handbollsförening
- Short name: DIF HF
- Founded: 1934
- Arena: Engelbrektshallen
- Club colours
Home	Away

Djurgårdens IF Handbollsförening (commonly known as Djurgården [ˈjʉ̂ːrˌɡoːɖɛn] or informally Djurgår'n [ˈjʉ̌ː(r)ɡɔɳ]; abbreviated DIF (IPA: [ˈdiːf]) is the handball section of Djurgårdens IF.

== History ==
Djurgårdens IF started its handball section in the 1934–35 season. In the 1938, they were in Swedish championship final against Västerås IK. The team played in top-tier Allsvenskan between 1939 and 1941.

The team folded once and restarted in 1990. In 2002, Djurgården merged with Elitserien team BK Söder and the new team competed in Elitserien as Djurgårdens IF.

In 2013, the senior team of Djurgårdens IF folded again. A new team started and plays in Division 5.

Djurgården plays in Division 1 Norra 2017–18 season.

=== Kits ===
HOME
2014–18	2018–19

AWAY

2017–18

== Honours ==
- Swedish Champions:
  - Runners-up (1): 1938
