= Upsala Studenters IF =

Swedish sport club

Upsala Studenters IF is a Swedish sport club from Uppsala founded in 1908. They club has had sections in basketball, table tennis, athletics, fencing, handball, volleyball, bandy and tennis The handball team was promoted to Allsvenskan in 1937. They won the Swedish championship, decided by a straight knockout tournament, in 1939. After that season, they withdrew from Allsvenskan and never returned. They did, however, play in the last edition of the Swedish championship tournament in 1952 (after that the Swedish champions title was awarded to the league winners). In 2012, the handball team merged with HK71 and formed Uppsala HK.
