= Stockholms-Flottans IF =

Swedish handball club

Stockholms-Flottans IF were a handball club from Stockholm. They played in the first Swedish championship final in 1932, but lost to Flottans IF Karlskrona. They reached the final again in 1933, but were beaten by Redbergslid. In 1934–35, they were founding members of Allsvenskan. In the same year they reached the Swedish championship final again, but were defeated by Majorna. They were runners-up to the Swedish championship a fourth time in 1942, again losing to Majorna. They played their last season in Allsvenskan in 1944–45.
