= IS Göta =

Swedish sport club

IS Göta are a Swedish sport club from Helsingborg founded in 1898. The club has had sections in athletics, football, bandy, ice hockey, tennis and handball. The handball team was promoted to Allsvenskan in 1965 and won the league in their debut season, earning the title of Swedish champions. They finished third in the following season, but after that their performances declined and they were relegated in 1970. The handball section was discontinued in 1981.
