= Irsta HF =

Swedish handball club

Irsta HF were a Swedish handball club based in Västerås. The club was founded in 1965. They were promoted to the top division, at the time known as Elitserien, in 1989. In their debut season in the top-flight, they finished fourth and qualified for the playoffs. They were eliminated in the semifinals by HK Drott. In the following season, they finished second in the league and defeated Ystads IF in the semifinals. They lost the final series against HK Drott. They participated in the EHF Cup Winners' Cup in 1991–92, but were eliminated by RK Crvena zvezda in the round of 16. They continued to play in Elitserien until they were relegated in 1996, but never again reached the playoffs.

In later years, the club had a cooperation with Västerås HF, with the clubs running a joint first team under the name Irsta Västerås Handboll. The team, which counted as a continuation of Irsta HF, played in the top division in 2004–05, but were relegated after one season. Irsta HF later withdrew from the cooperation and Västerås HF continued to run the first team with the name IVH Västerås. Irsta HF merged with IVH Västerås in 2011 to form the club VästeråsIrsta HF. The club played in the top division in 2012–13, but as of 2017–18 they play in Division 1, the third level.
