= Karlskrona Handboll =

Swedish handball club

- Full name: KFI Karlskrona Handboll
- Founded: 1920; 105 years ago
- Dissolved: 1 July 2022
- Arena: Karlskrona idrottshall, Karlskrona
- Capacity: 1,500
- Club colours
| Home | Away |

Karlskrona Handboll was a Swedish handball club based in Karlskrona, founded in 1920. They were the first Swedish champions in 1932. They were founding members of Allsvenskan in 1934–35. They reached the Swedish championship final again in 1936, but lost to Hellas. They were relegated from Allsvenskan in 1939 and have not returned since. Until the 1950s, almost all players of the club were members of the Swedish Navy (Flottan). In 2022 Karlskrona Handboll and HIF Karlskrona became one club, now under the name HF Karlskrona.

Location of Karlskrona Handboll

== Crest, colours, supporters ==
=== Naming history ===
| Name | Period |
|---|---|
| Flottans IF | 1920–1929 |
| Kungliga Flottans IF | 1929–2013 |
| KFI Karlskrona Handboll | 2013–2022 |

=== Kits ===
HOME
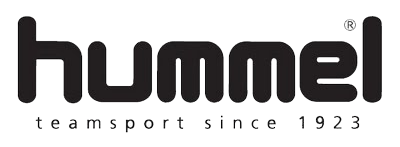
2019–

AWAY
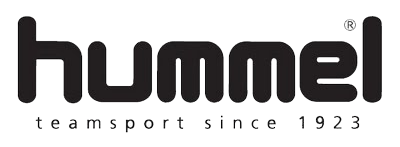
2018–

== Sports Hall information ==
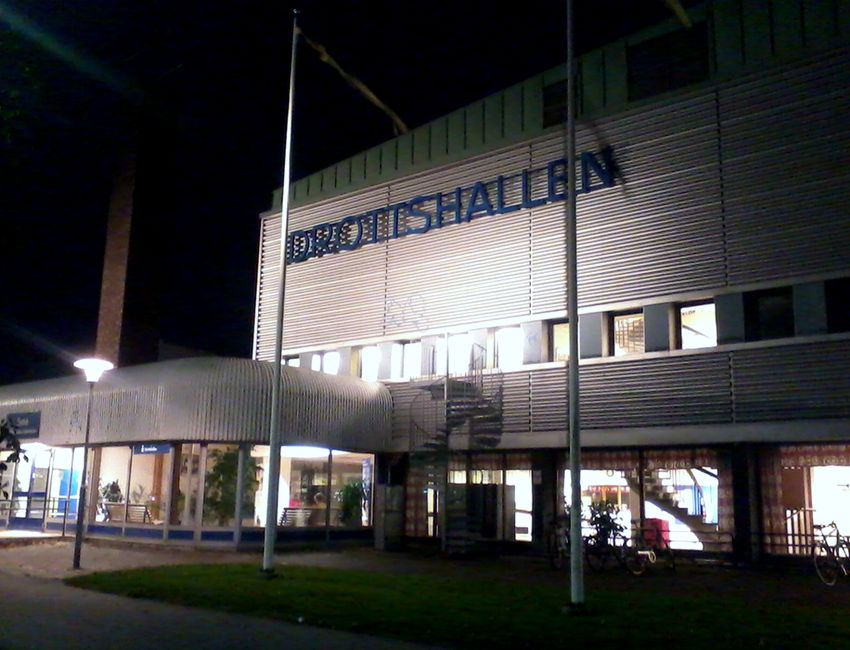
Home hall: Karlskrona idrottshall

- Name: – Karlskrona idrottshall
- City: – Karlskrona
- Capacity: – 1500
- Address: – Björkholmskajen 3, 371 36 Karlskrona, Sweden
