= 2017 Swedish Men's Handball Championship final =

- Event: 2016–17 Handbollsligan
IFK Kristianstad	Alingsås HK
31	25
- Date: 27 May 2017
- Venue: Malmö Arena, Malmö
- Attendance: 9,876

The 2017 Swedish Men's Handball Championship final (Swedish: SM-finalen i handboll för herrar 2017) was a handball match that took place at Malmö Arena in Malmö on 27 May 2017 to decide the winner of the 2016–17 Handbollsligan. The match was contested by IFK Kristianstad and Alingsås HK. Kristianstad won the match by 31–25 to win their third consecutive Swedish title.

== Background ==
Kristianstad entered the match as two-time defending champions, having won the titles in 2015 and 2016. Kristianstad had won the regular season, whereas Alingsås had finished fifth. Both regular season matches between the teams had finished with home wins, with Alingsås winning by 30–24 and Kristianstad by 25–16. The teams had previously faced each other in the quarter-finals in 2012 and 2013 and in the final in 2015 and 2016, with Kristianstad winning each time. It was the fifth time that Malmö Arena hosted the final, following 2010, 2012, 2014 and 2016.

== Road to the final ==
Kristianstad defeated Eskilstuna Guif by 3–0 in the quarter-final series and Ystads IF by 3–1 in the semi-finals. Alingsås won both the quarter-finals against HK Malmö and the semi-finals against IK Sävehof by 3–1.

== Match ==
=== Summary ===
Kristianstad started the match strongly and led by 4–0 after nine minutes. The teams followed each other to 8–4, but Kristianstad extended the lead to 16–7 and led by 18–11 at half-time. Alingsås played better at the start of the second half and reduced the deficit to 22–19. However, after that they went eight minutes without a goal and Kristianstad extended the lead to 26-20. Kristianstad held on to the lead and won by 31–25. Kristianstad's Jerry Tollbring was the top scorer of the match at 10 goals. Andreas Flodman scored the most goals for Alingsås, 9.

=== Details ===
27 May 2017	IFK Kristianstad	31–25	Alingsås HK	Malmö Arena, Malmö; Attendance: 9,876
27 May 2017	Tollbring 10	(18–11)	Flodman 9	Malmö Arena, Malmö; Attendance: 9,876

== Reactions ==
Kristianstad player Albin Lagergren praised teammate Jerry Tollbring, saying that "we just had to give the ball to Jerry and it was a goal, he did whatever he wanted to." According to Kristianstad captain Ólafur Guðmundsson his team's strong start to the match was decisive. Kristianstad goalkeeper Nebojša Simić praised his team's fans after the match saying that "they are like wings on your back". Alingsås coach Mikael Franzén said after the match: "the uphill slope is too steep from the start against such a good team as Kristianstad. I can't say anymore than that it is fair, they push us down and don't give us the chance." He highlighted his team's inability to best Simić as a reason for the loss, saying "[Simić] is good today, but not impossible. He makes some saves that are important, but naturally if we had got the better of him earlier you never know." Alingsås player Max Darj said "we did a lot of things that we certainly shouldn't do. (...) We have been here before, we should have learned our lesson".
