= 2016 Swedish Men's Handball Championship final =

- Event: 2015–16 Elitserien
IFK Kristianstad	Alingsås HK
27	18
- Date: 22 May 2016
- Venue: Malmö Arena, Malmö
- Attendance: 11,579

The 2016 Swedish Men's Handball Championship final (Swedish: SM-finalen i handboll för herrar 2016) was a handball match that took place at Malmö Arena in Malmö on 22 May 2016 to decide the winner of the 2015–16 Elitserien. The match was contested by IFK Kristianstad and Alingsås HK. Kristianstad won the match by 27–18 to win their second consecutive Swedish title.

== Background ==
The match was contested by the champions of the two previous seasons, with Kristianstad having won the title in 2015 and Alingsås in 2014. Kristianstad had won the regular season, 16 points ahead of second placed Alingsås (2 points for a win). Kristianstad won both matches between the teams in the regular season, winning 34–26 at home and 28–27 away. The teams had previously faced each other in the quarter-finals in 2012 and 2013 and in the final in 2015, with Kristianstad winning each time. It was the fourth time that Malmö Arena hosted the final, following 2010, 2012 and 2014.

== Road to the final ==
Kristianstad were undefeated in the playoffs going into the final, having swept Redbergslids IK and IK Sävehof in the quarter-finals and semi-finals, respectively. Alingsås HK defeated Eskilstuna Guif by 3–1 in the quarter-final series and swept Ystads IF in the semi-finals.

== Match ==
=== Summary ===
Kristianstad dominated the match from the start and took the lead by 7–2. The following period was relatively close and Kristianstad extended their lead by a single goal to 11–5. Kristianstad finished the first half as well as they had started it, and led by 18–6 at half-time. Alingsås were better at the start of the second half and reduced the deficit to 19–12, thanks in part to several counter-attack goals. However, they never got closer than 7 goals in the second half as Kristianstad extended their lead to 23–14. Kristianstad maintained the lead and won by 27–18. Kristianstad's Iman Jamali was the top scorer of the match at 8 goals. Andreas Flodman scored the most goals for Alingsås, 5.

=== Details ===
22 May 2016	IFK Kristianstad	27–18	Alingsås HK	Malmö Arena, Malmö; Attendance: 11,579
22 May 2016	Jamali 8	(18–6)	Flodman 5	Malmö Arena, Malmö; Attendance: 11,579

== Reactions ==
Kristianstad coach Ola Lindgren said after the match: "The first half is the best one we've played this season. (...) I couldn't have dreamt of a twelve-goal lead at half-time." Alingsås coach Mikael Franzén criticised himself after the match, saying "obviously I have a big part in us being so battered. We all have a part in it, obviously." Alingsås player Fredrik Teern said that their defence was "insecure" and "out of sync" and that they did not get close enough to Kristianstad's shooters. In particular he believed they gave Jamali too much space. Sveriges Radio pundit and former player Magnus Wislander said that "it is adult men who play against little boys. Kristianstad are outstanding in Swedish handball".
