= 2016–17 Handbollsligan =

Handbollsligan
- Season: 2016–17
- Champions: IFK Kristianstad (7th title)
- Matches: 262
- All statistics correct as of 5 June 2017.

The 2016–17 Handbollsligan is the 83rd season of the Handbollsligan, Swedish's top-tier handball league. A total of fourteen teams contest this season's league, which began on 13 September 2016 and is scheduled to conclude on 27 May 2017.

IFK Kristianstad are the defending champions, having beaten Alingsås HK 27–18 in the previous season's final.

== Format ==
The first 7 rounds consist on a round-robin tournament with 2 groups of 7 teams each. Then, the competition format for the 2016–17 season consists of a home-and-away round-robin system. The top 8 teams qualify directly to quarterfinals, while teams ranked 11th to 13th play a play-down round against teams ranked 2nd to 4th from the lower division. Last ranked team is directly relegated to Allsvenskan.

== Teams ==
2016–17 Handbollsligan

The following 14 clubs competed in Handbollsligan during the 2016–17 season. HK Drott was relegated from the previous season and IFK Ystad was promoted from 2015 to 2016 Allsvenskan.

Team	City	Arena
Alingsås HK	Alingsås	Estrad Arena
Eskilstuna Guif	Eskilstuna	Eskilstuna Sporthall
Hammarby IF	Stockholm	Eriksdalshallen
IFK Ystad	Ystad	Ystad Arena
HIF Karlskrona	Karlskrona	Karlskrona idrottshall
IFK Kristianstad	Kristianstad	Kristianstad Arena
Lugi HF	Lund	FFS Arena
HK Malmö	Malmö	Baltiska Hallen
Redbergslids IK	Gothenburg	Lisebergshallen
Ricoh HK	Stockholm	Solnahallen
IFK Skövde	Skövde	Arena Skövde
IK Sävehof	Partille	Partillebohallen
Ystads IF HF	Ystad	Ystad Arena
HK Aranäs	Kungsbacka	Aranäshallen

== Regular season ==
=== Standings ===
Pos	Team	Pld	W	D	L	GF	GA	GD	Pts	Qualification
1	IFK Kristianstad	32	25	1	6	901	769	+132	51	Play-offs
2	Lugi HF	32	23	2	7	885	777	+108	48	Play-offs
3	Redbergslids IK	32	23	1	8	859	741	+118	47	Play-offs
4	HK Malmö	32	20	3	9	859	773	+86	43	Play-offs
5	Alingsås HK	32	21	0	11	904	796	+108	42	Play-offs
6	IK Sävehof	32	20	2	10	923	855	+68	42	Play-offs
7	Eskilstuna Guif	32	14	5	13	851	858	−7	33	Play-offs
8	Ystads IF HF	32	15	1	16	891	864	+27	31	Play-offs
9	IFK Skövde	32	12	2	18	854	898	−44	26	
10	Ricoh HK	32	11	4	17	787	839	−52	26	
11	HK Aranäs	32	8	6	18	823	932	−109	22	Relegation Round
12	Hammarby IF	32	7	3	22	747	844	−97	17	Relegation Round
13	HIF Karlskrona	32	4	4	24	768	933	−165	12	Relegation Round
14	IFK Ystad	32	2	4	26	780	953	−173	8	Relegation

Updated to match(es) played on 5 June 2017. Source: Handbollsligan

=== Results ===
Round 1–7

Home \ Away	ALI	ESK	HAM	RED	RIC	SAV	SKO
Alingsås HK		26–24		36–22		30–32	
Eskilstuna Guif			25–17		28–28		26–26
Hammarby IF	21–28			21–25		26–30	
Redbergslids IK		21–26			29–25	32–26	
Ricoh HK	28–30		27–22				24–23
IK Sävehof		30–24			36–22		30–28
IFK Skövde	23–27		31–25	28–24			

Legend: Blue = home team win; Yellow = draw; Red = away team win.

Home \ Away	ARA	KAR	KRI	LUG	MAL	YIF	YST
HK Aranäs		27–28	22–26			25–33	
HIF Karlskrona			22–24		21–23	29–35	
IFK Kristianstad					32–24	30–25	33–23
Lugi HF	36–23	35–17	26–25				
HK Malmö	34–21			22–25			27–11
Ystads IF HF				20–22	27–25		27–23
IFK Ystad	22–26	23–30		29–29			

Legend: Blue = home team win; Yellow = draw; Red = away team win.

Round 8-33

Home \ Away	ALI	ARA	ESK	HAM	KAR	KRI	LUG	MAL	RED	RIC	SAV	SKO	YIF	YST
Alingsås HK		29–24	23–30	28–21	35–31	30–24	21–29	24–23	23–28	31–21	29–26	36–20	34–24	37–23
HK Aranäs	26–37		23–29	26–30	27–22	35–29	31–29	24–24	22–33	21–22	22–33	33–25	29–27	35–31
Eskilstuna Guif	31–24	28–28		25–21	32–29	25–26	22–30	25–36	0–10	27–29	31–25	28–28	33–32	33–33
Hammarby IF	26–25	26–26	30–28		32–23	21–29	23–24	27–27	22–31	22–26	23–26	24–26	23–25	26–18
HIF Karlskrona	25–40	24–24	23–24	26–32		24–32	25–25	21–29	24–38	21–27	25–27	29–27	25–33	32–27
IFK Kristianstad	25–16	33–18	27–23	33–21	33–18		31–25	23–20	25–16	28–27	22–20	34–26	28–27	39–22
Lugi HF	28–26	25–20	31–26	29–23	31–20	19–29		27–22	32–27	33–21	31–22	31–24	24–20	33–28
HK Malmö	26–21	35–27	30–24	26–16	29–20	25–25	26–25		20–25	29–25	32–29	28–24	29–28	31–29
Redbergslids IK	18–27	30–20	33–25	25–14	27–23	31–21	29–18	27–30		27–17	22–24	26–23	32–26	29–22
Ricoh HK	26–27	32–27	25–34	19–19	21–21	23–26	26–23	24–28	18–25		28–28	20–21	18–28	26–21
IK Sävehof	27–21	28–28	28–31	29–21	38–21	30–23	26–30	25–24	27–28	27–26		36–24	32–27	35–30
IFK Skövde	18–26	28–30	36–25	24–27	24–18	32–33	23–28	20–31	27–30	32–31	36–26		31–30	34–27
Ystads IF HF	31–27	33–22	25–28	27–24	28–27	28–25	30–28	27–18	31–31	28–29	25–28	29–32		33–30
IFK Ystad	15–30	31–31	25–31	27–21	24–24	25–28	20–24	24–26	18–28	17–26	33–37	26–30	23–22	

Legend: Blue = home team win; Yellow = draw; Red = away team win.

== Play-offs ==
Quarterfinals
1	IFK Kristianstad	30	27	39
7	Eskilstuna Guif	19	21	17
2	Lugi HF	20	34	26	24	22
8	Ystads IF HF	19	31	27	25	23
3	Redbergslids IK	29	29	31	18	23
6	IK Sävehof	28	23	32	26	25
4	HK Malmö	20	22	26	21
5	Alingsås HK	24	31	20	27

Semifinals
1	IFK Kristianstad	32	23	37	30
8	Ystads IF HF	26	26	25	27
6	IK Sävehof	20	28	23	27
5	Alingsås HK	27	23	24	33

Final
1	IFK Kristianstad	31
5	Alingsås HK	25

== Season statistics ==
=== Top goalscorers ===
Rank	Player	Club	Goals
1	(Sweden) Simon Jeppsson	Lugi HF	236
2	(Sweden) Fredrik Petersen	HK Malmö	181
3	(Denmark) Lars Møller Madsen	HIF Karlskrona	179
4	(Sweden) Linus Arnesson	Redbergslids IK	164
5	(Sweden) Hampus Andersson	Ystads IF HF	161
6	(Sweden) Tommy Atterhäll	HK Aranäs	156
7	(Sweden) Olle Forsell Schefvert	IK Sävehof	154
8	(Sweden) Emil Mellegård	Redbergslids IK	152
9	(Sweden) Alfred Ehn	IFK Skövde	151
10	(Sweden) Hampus Jildenbäck	Lugi HF	147

=== Player of the month ===
Month	Player of the Month	
Month	Player	Club
September	(Sweden) Kim Andersson	Ystads IF HK
October	(Sweden) Olle Forsell Schefvert	IK Sävehof
November	(Sweden) Simon Jeppsson	Lugi HF
December	(Sweden) Linuas Arnesson	Redbergslids IK
January	(Sweden) Martin Lindell	HK Aranäs
February	(Sweden) Tobias Thulin	Redbergslids IK
March	(Sweden) Simon Jeppsson	Lugi HF
April	(Norway) Stig Tore Moen Nilsen	IFK Kristianstad

=== Attendance ===
Team	Attendance
IFK Kristianstad	4764
Ystads IF HF	2217
IK Sävehof	1811
Alingsås HK	1700
Lugi HF	1628
IFK Skövde HK	1447
HK Malmö	1257
Eskilstuna Guif	1190
Hammarby IF	1126
HK Aranäs	1022
HIF Karlskrona	1010
IFK Ystad HK	871
Redbergslids IK	865
Ricoh HK	526
