= 2010–11 Elitserien (men's handball) =

Swedish handball season

Elitserien
- 2010–11

Tournament information
- Sport: Handball
- Teams: 14

Final positions
- Champions: IK Sävehof (4th title)
- Runner-up: Eskilstuna Guif

The 2010–11 Elitserien was the 77th season of the top division of Swedish handball. 14 teams competed in the league. The eight highest placed teams qualified for the playoffs, whereas teams 11–13 had to play relegation playoffs against teams from the second division, and team 14 was relegated automatically. IK Sävehof won the regular season and also won the playoffs to claim their fourth Swedish title.

== League table ==
Pos	Team	Pld	W	D	L	GF	GA	GD	Pts
1	IK Sävehof	32	23	3	6	1007	848	159	49
2	Eskilstuna Guif	32	23	3	6	967	841	126	49
3	Lugi HF	32	18	5	9	869	823	46	41
4	IFK Skövde	32	19	1	12	917	897	20	39
5	Alingsås HK	32	14	6	12	813	801	12	34
6	Redbergslids IK	32	15	3	14	922	908	14	33
7	HK Drott	32	14	3	15	838	873	−35	31
8	HK Malmö	32	13	4	15	878	877	1	30
9	HK Aranäs	32	13	3	16	884	891	−7	29
10	Ystads IF	32	13	3	16	825	892	−67	29
11	IFK Kristianstad	32	11	4	17	819	860	−41	26
12	Hammarby IF	32	11	3	18	813	869	−56	25
13	H 43 Lund	32	9	0	23	841	925	−84	18
14	LIF Lindesberg	32	5	5	22	892	980	−88	15

== Playoffs ==
=== Group stage ===
==== Group 1 ====
- Bonus points: IK Sävehof 3, IFK Skövde 2, Alingsås HK 1

Pos	Team	Pld	W	D	L	GF	GA	GD	Pts
1	IK Sävehof	6	5	0	1	182	144	38	13
2	Alingsås HK	6	4	0	2	156	146	10	9
3	HK Malmö	6	3	0	3	147	161	−14	6
4	IFK Skövde	6	0	0	6	145	179	−34	2

==== Group 2 ====
- Bonus points: Eskilstuna Guif 3, Lugi HF 2, Redbergslids IK 1

Pos	Team	Pld	W	D	L	GF	GA	GD	Pts
1	Eskilstuna Guif	6	4	1	1	190	175	15	12
2	HK Drott	6	4	0	2	171	157	14	8
3	Lugi HF	6	2	0	4	161	172	−11	6
4	Redbergslids IK	6	1	1	4	173	191	−18	4

=== Semifinals ===
- Sävehof–Drott 26–22
- Drott–Sävehof 19–30
- Sävehof–Drott 34–24

Sävehof won series 3–0

- Guif–Alingsås 34–23
- Alingsås–Guif 27–25
- Guif–Alingsås 29–24
- Alingsås–Guif 21–27

Guif won series 3–1

=== Final ===
- Sävehof–Guif 35–18

== Attendance ==
Team	Attendance
IFK Kristianstad	2769
HK Drott Halmstad	1918
Eskilstuna Guif	1891
Ystads IF HF	1734
Lugi HF	1508
IFK Skövde HK	1478
LIF Lindesberg	1466
HK Malmö	1137
H 43 Lund	1037
HK Aranäs	1034
IK Sävehof	1025
Alingsås HK	922
Hammarby IF	820
Redbergslids IK	721
