= 2017–18 Handbollsligan =

Handbollsligan
- 2017–18

Tournament information
- Sport: Handball
- Teams: 14

Final positions
- Champions: IFK Kristianstad (8th title)
- Runner-up: HK Malmö

The 2017–18 Handbollsligan was the 84th season of the top division of Swedish handball. 14 teams competed in the league. The eight highest placed teams qualified for the playoffs, whereas teams 11–13 had to play relegation playoffs against teams from the second division, and team 14 was relegated automatically. IFK Kristianstad won the regular season and also won the playoffs to claim their eighth Swedish title.

== League table ==
Pos	Team	Pld	W	D	L	GF	GA	GD	Pts
1	IFK Kristianstad	32	27	3	2	906	760	146	57
2	HK Malmö	32	24	0	8	888	758	130	48
3	Alingsås HK	32	22	0	10	877	795	82	44
4	Lugi HF	32	21	2	9	850	804	46	44
5	Redbergslids IK	32	19	5	8	926	835	91	43
6	Ystads IF HF	32	20	2	10	943	860	83	42
7	Eskilstuna Guif	32	19	1	12	870	862	8	39
8	IK Sävehof	32	17	2	13	890	845	45	36
9	Hammarby IF	32	10	3	19	847	893	−46	23
10	IFK Skövde	32	10	2	20	874	949	−75	22
11	Ricoh HK	32	8	0	24	773	854	−81	16
12	HK Aranäs	32	6	1	25	764	901	−137	13
13	HIF Karlskrona	32	5	1	26	850	984	−134	11
14	OV Helsingborg HK	32	5	0	27	782	940	−158	10

== Playoffs bracket ==
Quarterfinals
1	IFK Kristianstad	28	32	32	26
7	Eskilstuna Guif	23	33*	25	23
4	Lugi HF	29	27	23
5	Redbergslids IK	25	18	19
2	HK Malmö	22	31*	25
8	IK Sävehof	18	27	23
3	Alingsås HK	28	28	29*	26	27
6	Ystads IF HF	29*	24	28	32	25

Semifinals
1	IFK Kristianstad	25	25	31	27
4	Lugi HF	23	26	23	23
2	HK Malmö	24	28	21	24	28
3	Alingsås HK	27	23	24	22	23

Final
1	IFK Kristianstad	23*
2	HK Malmö	22

- An asterisk (*) denotes result after extra time

== Attendance ==
Team	Attendance
IFK Kristianstad	4481
Eskilstuna Guif	1980
Ystads IF HF	1699
Alingsås HK	1664
Lugi HF	1542
IK Sävehof	1398
IFK Skövde	1329
HK Malmö	1181
Hammarby IF	1071
OV Helsingborg HK	1023
HK Aranäs	981
Redbergslids IK	870
HIF Karlskrona	816
Ricoh HK	539
