= 2015 Swedish Men's Handball Championship final =

- Event: 2014–15 Elitserien
| IFK Kristianstad | Alingsås HK |
| 28 | 25 |
- Date: 24 May 2015
- Venue: Scandinavium, Gothenburg
- Attendance: 12,312

The 2015 Swedish Men's Handball Championship final (Swedish: SM-finalen i handboll för herrar 2015) was a handball match that took place at Scandinavium in Gothenburg on 24 May 2015 to decide the winner of the 2014–15 Elitserien. The match was contested by regular season winners IFK Kristianstad and defending champions Alingsås HK. Kristianstad won the match by 28–25 to win their first Swedish title since 1953.

== Background ==
Alingsås entered the match as defending champions, having won the title in 2014. Kristianstad had most recently won the title in 1953, having lost the finals in 2012 and 2013. Kristianstad had won the regular season, 10 points ahead of second placed Alingsås (2 points for a win). Kristianstad won both matches between the teams in the regular season, winning by 30–26 at home and 28–27 away. The teams had previously faced each other in the quarter-finals in 2012 and 2013, with Kristianstad winning both times. It was the fifth time that Scandinavium hosted the final, following 2006, 2008, 2011 and 2013.

== Road to the final ==
Kristianstad defeated Hammarby IF by 3–2 in the quarter-final series, and Ystads IF by 3–1 in the semi-finals. Alingsås were undefeated in the playoffs before the final, having defeated both HK Malmö and Eskilstuna Guif in straight matches.

== Match ==
=== Summary ===
The first half was close and the teams were tied at 14–14 at half-time. Alingsås started the second half best and took the lead by 18–15. Kristianstad coach Ola Lindgren used a time-out 9:11 into the half, after which his team scored six unanswered goals to take the lead by 21–18. Kristianstad led by 24–22 but Alingsås came back to 24–24. Kristianstad finished the match strongly and won by 28–25. Kristianstad's Markus Olsson was the top scorer of the match at 11 goals. Jesper Konradsson scored the most goals for Alingsås, 6.

=== Details ===
| 24 May 2015 | IFK Kristianstad | 28–25 | Alingsås HK | Scandinavium, Gothenburg; Attendance: 12,312 |
| 24 May 2015 | Olsson 11 | (14–14) | Konradsson 6 | Scandinavium, Gothenburg; Attendance: 12,312 |

== Reactions ==
Ola Lindgren said after the match: "I feel a great joy for everyone. For the guys who have put in all the work, and for the club and everyone around it who have waited an extremely long time for the gold. Many had talked about how we couldn't win a final." He said that he did not feel certain that they were going to win until Alingsås gave the ball away with 20 seconds left. Lindgren also praised the support for both teams at the match. Alingsås coach Mikael Franzén said that "it was small margins – small things that were the difference. (...) But Kristiantad deserved to win. They are a good team and were better than us today." He also praised Kristianstad goalkeeper Leo Larsson, saying that "[he] made some really good saves, in many ways it was decisive". Alingsås player Daniel Tellander said that they committed too many turnovers, but praised the morale of the team.
