= 2018–19 Handbollsligan =

Handbollsligan
- 2018–19

Tournament information
- Sport: Handball
- Teams: 14

Final positions
- Champions: IK Sävehof (6th title)
- Runner-up: Alingsås HK

The 2018–19 Handbollsligan was the 85th season of the top division of Swedish handball. 14 teams competed in the league. The eight highest placed teams qualified for the playoffs, whereas teams 11–13 had to play relegation playoffs against teams from the second division, and team 14 was relegated automatically. IFK Kristianstad won the regular season, but IK Sävehof won the playoffs and claimed their sixth Swedish title.

== League table ==
Pos	Team	Pld	W	D	L	GF	GA	GD	Pts
1	IFK Kristianstad	32	26	0	6	932	807	125	52
2	HK Malmö	32	21	2	9	876	793	83	44
3	IFK Skövde	32	21	1	10	941	855	86	43
4	Alingsås HK	32	19	3	10	893	821	72	41
5	Lugi HF	32	18	3	11	872	812	60	39
6	Ystads IF	32	17	4	11	896	853	43	38
7	IK Sävehof	32	17	3	12	917	890	27	37
8	Redbergslids IK	32	17	3	12	861	845	16	37
9	Eskilstuna Guif	32	12	3	17	806	854	−48	27
10	IFK Ystad	32	8	6	18	827	869	−42	22
11	Önnereds HK	32	7	5	20	842	948	−106	19
12	HIF Karlskrona	32	9	0	23	802	918	−116	18
13	AIK	32	8	1	23	781	865	−84	17
14	Hammarby IF	32	7	0	25	807	923	−116	14

== Playoffs bracket ==
Quarterfinals
1	IFK Kristianstad	27	27	37	25	X
8	Redbergslids IK	25	24	38*	22	X
4	Alingsås HK	25*	19	25	28	27
6	Ystads IF	23	25	27	21	26
3	IFK Skövde	27	21	26	X	X
5	Lugi HF	26	19	19	X	X
2	HK Malmö	25	26	22	28	X
7	IK Sävehof	28*	25	23	29	X

Semifinals
1	IFK Kristianstad	22	25	25	X	X
4	Alingsås HK	24	28	29	X	X
3	IFK Skövde	30	23	25	23	X
7	IK Sävehof	29	26	28	28	X

Finals
4	Alingsås HK	30	22	25	29	20
7	IK Sävehof	33	16	22	32*	27

== Attendance ==
Team	Attendance
IFK Kristianstad	4271
IFK Skövde	1910
Eskilstuna Guif	1827
Ystads IF	1675
Alingsås HK	1619
IK Sävehof	1334
Lugi HF	1325
IFK Ystad	1247
HK Malmö	1182
Hammarby IF	1014
Redbergslids IK	1000
HIF Karlskrona	947
Önnereds HK	601
AIK	432
