= 2008–09 Elitserien (men's handball) =

75th season of the top division of Swedish handball

Elitserien
- 2008–09

Tournament information
- Sport: Handball
- Teams: 14

Final positions
- Champions: Alingsås HK (1st title)
- Runner-up: IF Guif

The 2008–09 Elitserien was the 75th season of the top division of Swedish handball. 14 teams competed in the league. The eight highest placed teams qualified for the playoffs, whereas teams 11–12 had to play relegation playoffs against teams from the second division, and teams 13–14 were relegated automatically. IK Sävehof won the regular season, but Alingsås HK won the playoffs and claimed their first Swedish title.

== League table ==
Pos	Team	Pld	W	D	L	GF	GA	GD	Pts
1	IK Sävehof	26	18	4	4	791	675	116	40
2	Alingsås HK	26	16	4	6	740	680	60	36
3	IF Guif	26	17	1	8	793	708	85	35
4	Ystads IF	26	15	2	9	782	726	56	32
5	Hammarby IF	26	14	3	9	795	719	76	31
6	Redbergslids IK	26	14	3	9	767	754	13	31
7	Lugi HF	26	14	1	11	711	703	8	29
8	LIF Lindesberg	26	12	4	10	735	725	10	28
9	IFK Skövde	26	12	1	13	772	735	37	25
10	H 43 Lund	26	11	2	13	705	717	−12	24
11	HK Drott	26	9	1	16	706	741	−35	19
12	IFK Trelleborg	26	7	1	18	700	793	−93	15
13	IFK Ystad	26	5	0	21	673	844	−171	10
14	IFK Tumba	26	4	1	21	673	823	−150	9

== Playoffs bracket ==
Quarterfinals
2	Alingsås HK	25	22	29	23	38
8	LIF Lindesberg	24	26	26	25	22
4	Ystads IF	34	27	30	29
5	Hammarby IF	36*	33	23	32
1	IK Sävehof	30	29	27
6	Redbergslids IK	20	26	23
3	IF Guif	31	30	26	35
7	Lugi HF	33	25	25	22

Semifinals
2	Alingsås HK	27	19	30	22	35
5	Hammarby IF	22	30	29	27	26
1	IK Sävehof	35	26	28	22	20
3	IF Guif	25	30	26	28	22

Final
2	Alingsås HK	29
3	IF Guif	26

- An asterisk (*) denotes result after extra time

== Attendance ==
Team	Attendance
Eskilstuna Guif	1975
Lugi HF	1940
IFK Skövde HK	1832
Ystads IF HF	1714
LIF Lindesberg	1554
H 43 Lund	1313
IK Sävehof	1271
HK Drott Halmstad	1053
Alingsås HK	1039
IFK Ystad HK	1027
Hammarby IF	947
Redbergslids IK	744
IFK Trelleborg	701
IFK Tumba	539
