= 2009–10 Elitserien (men's handball) =

Swedish handball season

Elitserien
- 2009–10

Tournament information
- Sport: Handball
- Teams: 14

Final positions
- Champions: IK Sävehof (3rd title)
- Runner-up: HK Drott

The 2009–10 Elitserien was the 76th season of the top division of Swedish handball. 14 teams competed in the league. The eight highest placed teams qualified for the playoffs, whereas teams 11–13 had to play relegation playoffs against teams from the second division, and team 14 was relegated automatically. IK Sävehof won the regular season and also won the playoffs to claim their third Swedish title.

== League table ==
Pos	Team	Pld	W	D	L	GF	GA	GD	Pts
1	IK Sävehof	26	19	3	4	813	690	123	41
2	Alingsås HK	26	16	3	7	727	671	56	35
3	IF Guif	26	17	0	9	798	722	76	34
4	Ystads IF	26	16	0	10	779	749	30	32
5	HK Drott	26	14	3	9	697	660	37	31
6	Hammarby IF	26	11	3	12	744	726	18	25
7	IFK Skövde	26	11	3	12	723	734	−11	25
8	HK Malmö	26	12	1	13	702	728	−26	25
9	Redbergslids IK	26	11	2	13	790	778	12	24
10	Lugi HF	26	11	2	13	715	755	−40	24
11	IFK Kristianstad	26	10	1	15	665	720	−55	21
12	LIF Lindesberg	26	9	1	16	698	745	−47	19
13	H 43 Lund	26	6	5	15	660	718	−58	17
14	OV Helsingborg	26	5	1	20	677	792	−115	11

== Playoffs ==
=== Group stage ===
==== Group 1 ====
- Bonus points: IK Sävehof 3, Ystads IF 2, Hammarby IF 1

Pos	Team	Pld	W	D	L	GF	GA	GD	Pts
1	IK Sävehof	6	5	0	1	191	163	28	13
2	Ystads IF	6	3	1	2	172	170	2	9
3	Hammarby IF	6	2	0	4	160	180	−20	5
4	HK Malmö	6	1	1	4	160	170	−10	3

==== Group 2 ====
- Bonus points: Alingsås HK 3, IF Guif 2, HK Drott 1

Pos	Team	Pld	W	D	L	GF	GA	GD	Pts
1	HK Drott	6	5	0	1	171	147	24	11
2	IF Guif	6	4	0	2	178	169	9	10
3	Alingsås HK	6	3	0	3	172	160	12	9
4	IFK Skövde	6	0	0	6	153	198	−45	0

=== Semifinals ===
- Sävehof–Guif 33–23
- Guif–Sävehof 28–30
- Sävehof–Guif 33–27

Sävehof won series 3–0

- Ystads IF–Drott 27–30
- Drott–Ystads IF 24–29
- Ystads IF–Drott 28–27
- Drott–Ystads IF 26–25
- Ystads IF–Drott 27–34

Drott won series 3–2

=== Final ===
- Sävehof–Drott 30–28 a.e.t.

== Attendance ==
Team	Attendance
Ystads IF HF	2089
Eskilstuna Guif	1964
HK Drott Halmstad	1924
IFK Kristianstad	1864
IFK Skövde HK	1761
Lugi HF	1704
HK Malmö	1648
LIF Lindesberg	1472
IK Sävehof	1281
H 43 Lund	1224
Hammarby IF	942
Alingsås HK	937
Redbergslids IK	779
OV Helsingborg	736
