= 2015–16 Elitserien (men's handball) =

Elitserien
- Season: 2015–16
- Champions: IFK Kristianstad (6th title)
- All statistics correct as of 5 July 2017.

During the 2015–16 season, Elitserien, the top league of Swedish men's handball, contained 14 teams. The championship was won by IFK Kristianstad.

== Teams ==
Location of teams in 2015 Allsvenskan

The following 14 teams compete in Elitserien in the 2015–16 season. HIF Karlskrona and HK Aranäs were promoted from 2014–15 Allsvenskan. Önnereds HK were relegated from the previous season whereas H 43 Lund left Elitserien during the 2014–15 season due to bankruptcy.

Team	Location	Arena	Capacity
Alingsås HK	Alingsås	Estrad Alingsås	2,800
HK Drott	Halmstad	Halmstad Arena	4,000
Eskilstuna Guif	Eskilstuna	Eskilstuna Sporthall	2,601
Hammarby IF	Stockholm	Eriksdalshallen	2,600
HIF Karlskrona	Karlskrona	Karlskrona idrottshall	1,500
HK Aranäs	Kungsbacka	Aranäshallen	
HK Malmö	Malmö	Baltiska hallen	4,000
IFK Kristianstad	Kristianstad	Kristianstad Arena	4,700
IFK Skövde	Skövde	Arena Skövde	2,516
IK Sävehof	Partille	Partillebohallen	2,000
Lugi HF	Lund	Sparbanken Skåne Arena	3,500
Redbergslids IK	Gothenburg	Lisebergshallen	2,000
Ricoh HK	Stockholm	Solnahallen	1,700
Ystads IF	Ystad	Österporthallen	2,400

== Standings ==
Pos	Team	Pld	W	D	L	GF	GA	GD	Pts	Qualification or relegation
1	IFK Kristianstad	32	30	0	2	959	764	+195	60	Play-offs
2	Alingsås HK	32	21	2	9	862	762	+100	44	Play-offs
3	LUGI HF	32	20	2	10	857	796	+61	42	Play-offs
4	Ystads IF HF	32	18	5	9	912	829	+83	41	Play-offs
5	HK Malmö	32	19	3	10	827	765	+62	41	Play-offs
6	IK Sävehof	32	18	3	11	865	819	+46	39	Play-offs
7	Redbergslids IK	32	18	3	11	843	802	+41	39	Play-offs
8	Eskilstuna Guif	32	16	4	12	850	806	+44	36	Play-offs
9	Hammarby IF HF	32	14	5	13	839	833	+6	33	
10	Ricoh HK	32	9	3	20	751	794	−43	21	
11	IFK Skövde HK	32	8	1	23	740	849	−109	17	Relegation Round
12	HIF Karlskrona	32	7	2	23	788	884	−96	16	Relegation Round
13	HK Aranäs	32	6	1	25	789	956	−167	13	Relegation Round
14	HK Drott Halmstad	32	2	2	28	779	1002	−223	6	Relegation

Updated to match(es) played on 1 November 2015. Source: svenskhandboll.se
Rules for classification: 1) points; 2) Goal difference; 3) Goals scored.

== Play-offs ==
Quarterfinals
1	IFK Kristianstad	29	27	24
7	Redbergslids IK	25	25	19
3	Lugi HF	28	29	25	24	23
6	IK Sävehof	29	26	24	27	25
2	Alingsås HK	23	24	33	31
8	Eskilstuna Guif	18	26	26	20
4	Ystads IF HF	29	33	33
5	HK Malmö	26	31	31

Semifinals
1	IFK Kristianstad	29	35	31
6	IK Sävehof	28	29	27
2	Alingsås HK	28	34	28
4	Ystads IF HF	23	22	26

Final
1	IFK Kristianstad	27
2	Alingsås HK	18

== Attendance ==
Team	Attendance
IFK Kristianstad	4843
Ystads IF HF	1830
Lugi HF	1779
Alingsås HK	1673
IFK Skövde HK	1542
Eskilstuna Guif	1434
Hammarby IF	1358
HIF Karlskrona	1196
HK Malmö	1110
IK Sävehof	1093
Redbergslids IK	957
HK Aranäs	920
HK Drott Halmstad	769
Ricoh HK	666
