= 2011–12 Elitserien (men's handball) =

Swedish handball season

Elitserien
- 2011–12

Tournament information
- Sport: Handball
- Teams: 14

Final positions
- Champions: IK Sävehof (5th title)
- Runner-up: IFK Kristianstad

The 2011–12 Elitserien was the 78th season of the top division of Swedish handball. 14 teams competed in the league. The eight highest placed teams qualified for the playoffs, whereas teams 11–13 had to play relegation playoffs against teams from the second division, and team 14 was relegated automatically. Eskilstuna Guif won the regular season, but IK Sävehof won the playoffs and claimed their fifth Swedish title.

== League table ==
| Pos | Team | Pld | W | D | L | GF | GA | GD | Pts |
|---|---|---|---|---|---|---|---|---|---|
| 1 | Eskilstuna Guif | 32 | 23 | 4 | 5 | 984 | 872 | 112 | 50 |
| 2 | Ystads IF | 32 | 22 | 3 | 7 | 918 | 859 | 59 | 47 |
| 3 | IK Sävehof | 32 | 22 | 2 | 8 | 952 | 823 | 129 | 46 |
| 4 | Alingsås HK | 32 | 19 | 2 | 11 | 819 | 770 | 49 | 40 |
| 5 | IFK Skövde | 32 | 15 | 6 | 11 | 929 | 892 | 37 | 36 |
| 6 | IFK Kristianstad | 32 | 16 | 4 | 12 | 873 | 847 | 26 | 36 |
| 7 | HK Malmö | 32 | 16 | 1 | 15 | 892 | 869 | 23 | 33 |
| 8 | Lugi HF | 32 | 15 | 2 | 15 | 850 | 826 | 24 | 32 |
| 9 | HK Drott Halmstad | 32 | 15 | 1 | 16 | 900 | 892 | 8 | 31 |
| 10 | Redbergslids IK | 32 | 14 | 1 | 17 | 896 | 891 | 5 | 29 |
| 11 | HK Aranäs | 32 | 10 | 2 | 20 | 839 | 945 | −106 | 22 |
| 12 | H 43 Lund | 32 | 9 | 1 | 22 | 860 | 986 | −126 | 19 |
| 13 | Hammarby IF | 32 | 6 | 2 | 24 | 802 | 905 | −103 | 14 |
| 14 | Caperiotumba | 32 | 4 | 5 | 23 | 816 | 953 | −137 | 13 |

== Playoffs bracket ==
Quarterfinals
2 | Ystads IF | 19 | 24 | 33 | 18 | 28
8 | Lugi HF | 22 | 20 | 25 | 27 | 25
3 | IK Sävehof | 23 | 32 | 31 | 26 | 31
5 | IFK Skövde | 26 | 28 | 26 | 30 | 20
1 | Eskilstuna Guif | 32* | 31 | 31
7 | HK Malmö | 30 | 29 | 23
4 | Alingsås HK | 23 | 17 | 22
6 | IFK Kristianstad | 26 | 22 | 23

Semifinals
2 | Ystads IF | 32 | 25 | 22 | 25
3 | IK Sävehof | 26 | 34 | 31 | 27
1 | Eskilstuna Guif | 30 | 31 | 25 | 27 | 33
6 | IFK Kristianstad | 28 | 32* | 23 | 34 | 34

Final
3 | IK Sävehof | 29
6 | IFK Kristianstad | 21

- An asterisk (*) denotes result after extra time

== Attendance ==
| Team | Attendance |
|---|---|
| IFK Kristianstad | 3245 |
| Eskilstuna Guif | 1828 |
| IFK Skövde HK | 1807 |
| Ystads IF HF | 1651 |
| HK Drott Halmstad | 1582 |
| Lugi HF | 1411 |
| HK Malmö | 1173 |
| H 43 Lund | 1153 |
| IK Sävehof | 1106 |
| Alingsås HK | 925 |
| Hammarby IF | 891 |
| HK Aranäs | 729 |
| Redbergslids IK | 699 |
| Caperiotumba | 546 |
