= 2001–02 Elitserien (men's handball) =

Swedish handball season

Elitserien
- 2001–02

Tournament information
- Sport: Handball
- Teams: 12

Final positions
- Champions: HK Drott (10th title)
- Runner-up: Redbergslids IK

The 2001–02 Elitserien was the 68th season of the top division of Swedish handball. 12 teams competed in the league. The league was split into an autumn league and a spring league. The eight highest placed teams in the autumn league qualified for the spring league, whereas the four lowest placed teams qualified for Allsvenskan along with the highest placed teams from the autumn season of Division I (the second level). The six highest placed teams in the spring season of Elitserien qualified for the quarterfinals, whereas the two lowest placed teams qualified for the preliminary round of the playoffs, along with the two highest placed teams of Allsvenskan. Redbergslids IK won the regular season, but HK Drott won the playoffs and claimed their 10th Swedish title.

== League tables ==
=== Autumn ===
Pos	Team	Pld	W	D	L	GF	GA	GD	Pts
1	Redbergslids IK	22	18	1	3	619	519	100	37
2	IFK Ystad	22	18	0	4	561	417	144	36
3	HK Drott	22	15	1	6	616	531	85	31
4	IK Sävehof	22	11	2	9	525	496	29	24
5	IFK Skövde	22	11	1	10	582	573	9	23
6	Lugi HF	22	10	3	9	529	548	−19	23
7	IFK Tumba	22	10	2	10	503	507	−4	22
8	H 43 Lund	22	7	3	12	468	498	−30	17
9	GIK Wasaiterna	22	7	2	13	487	551	−64	16
10	IF Guif	22	6	0	16	441	506	−65	12
11	Alingsås HK	22	5	2	15	469	537	−68	12
12	HP Warta	22	4	3	15	473	530	−57	11

=== Spring ===
Pos	Team	Pld	W	D	L	GF	GA	GD	Pts
1	Redbergslids IK	36	29	1	6	1049	862	187	59
2	IFK Ystad	36	26	4	6	943	806	137	56
3	HK Drott	36	21	4	11	1010	900	110	46
4	IFK Skövde	36	18	4	14	976	956	20	40
5	IK Sävehof	36	18	2	16	865	833	32	38
6	Lugi HF	36	15	4	17	863	933	−70	34
7	IFK Tumba	36	12	2	22	825	905	−80	26
8	H 43 Lund	36	11	4	21	792	874	−82	26

== Playoffs ==
=== First round ===
- GIK Wasaiterna–IFK Tumba 18–21
- IFK Tumba–GIK Wasaiterna 29–21

IFK Tumba won 50–39 on aggregate

- IF Guif–H 43 22–21
- H 43–IF Guif 23–23

IF Guif won 45–44 on aggregate

=== Quarterfinals ===
- Redbergslids IK–IFK Tumba 34–26
- IFK Tumba–Redbergslids IK 22–29

Redbergslids IK won series 2–0

- IFK Ystad–Lugi HF 26–21
- Lugi HF–IFK Ystad 22–15
- IFK Ystad–Lugi HF 24–27

Lugi HF won series 2–1

- HK Drott–IF Guif 27–24
- IF Guif–HK Drott 18–31

HK Drott won series 2–0

- IFK Skövde–IK Sävehof 25–23
- IK Sävehof–IFK Skövde 23–20
- IFK Skövde–IK Sävehof 19–27

IK Sävehof won series 2–1

=== Semifinals ===
- Redbergslids IK–IK Sävehof 29–28
- IK Sävehof–Redbergslids IK 20–28

Redbergslids IK won series 2–0

- HK Drott–Lugi HF 24–22
- Lugi HF–HK Drott 21–32

HK Drott won series 2–0

=== Finals ===
- Redbergslids IK–HK Drott 25–30
- HK Drott–Redbergslids IK 38–34

HK Drott won series 2–0
