= Isak Persson =

Swedish handball player (born 2000)

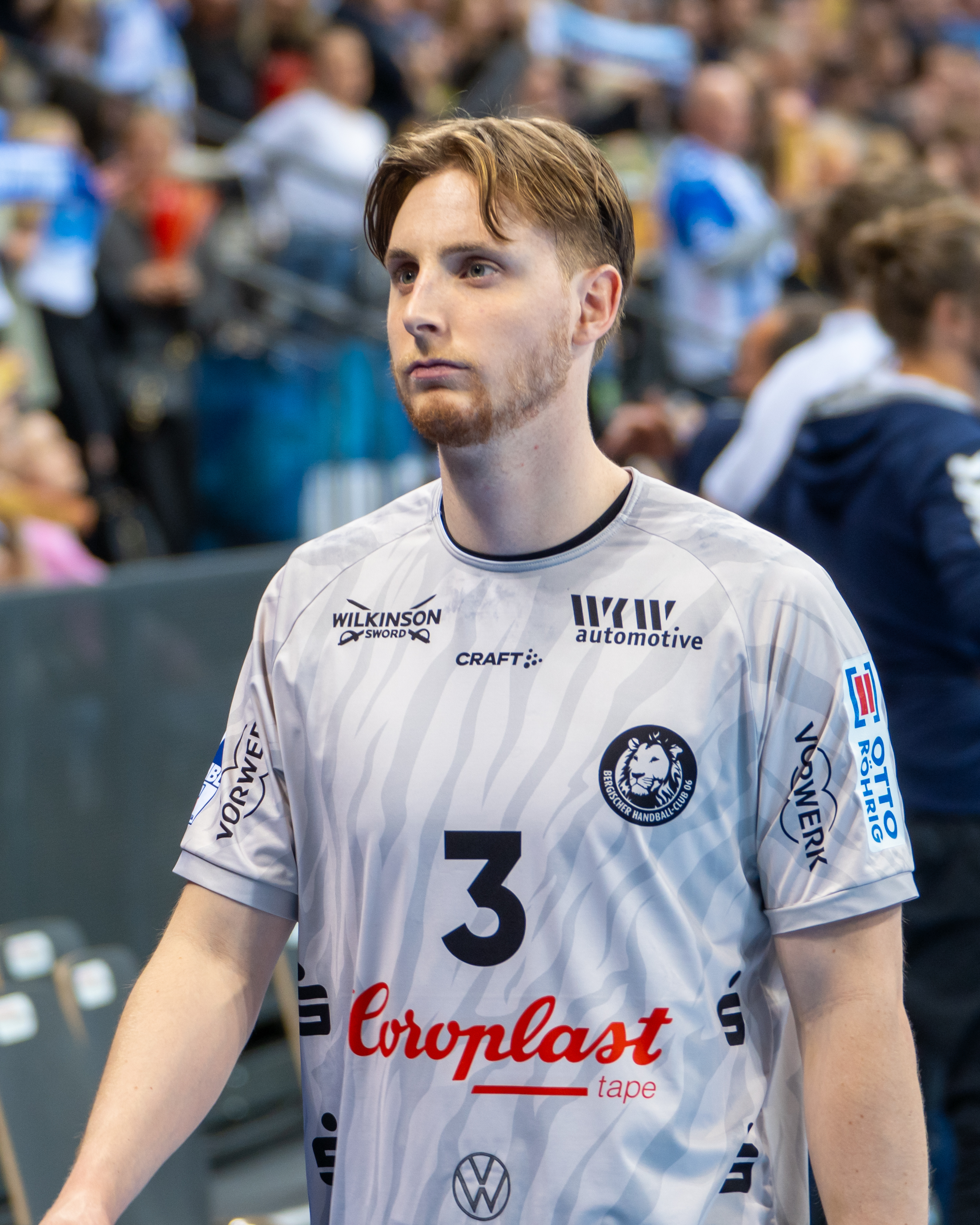

Personal information
- Nationality: Swedish
- Born: 7 November 2000 (age 26) Lund, Sweden
- Height: 1.90 m (6 ft 3 in)

Sport
- Sport: Handball
- Position: Right wing
- Current club: GOG Håndbold

Youth career
- Years: Team
- –: H43 Lund
- –: Lugi HF

Senior clubs
- Years: Team
- 2018–2022: Lugi HF
- 2022–2024: Bergischer HC
- 2024–2025: SC Magdeburg
- 2025–2026: HK Malmö
- 2026–: GOG Håndbold
National team
Years	Team	Apps	(Gls)
2021–	Sweden	9	(14)
Medal record
European Championship
Gold medal – first place	2022 Hungary/Slovakia

Isak Persson (born 7 November 2000) is a Swedish handball player for GOG Håndbold and the Swedish national team.

== Career ==
Isak Persson started playing handball at H 43 Lund, where his father was a coach. He then joined Lugi HF, where he made his senior debut in the 2017-18 season in the EHF Cup. His league debut came in the 2018-19 season. In the 2020-21 season he was the top scorer with 177 goals, and was selected for the all star team.

For the 2022-23 season he joined German Bundesliga team Bergischer HC.

After the team was relegated to the 2. Bundesliga in 2024, he joined SC Magdeburg. Here he played a single season, where he won the 2024-25 EHF Champions League.

He then returned to Sweden and joined HK Malmö.

=== National team ===
Persson made his debut for the Swedish national team on November 6th 2021 against Poland.

He was initially not selected for the Swedish team for the 2022 European Men's Handball Championship, but was afterwards called up to replace Niclas Ekberg who had to withdraw due to illness. He played 2 games and scored 4 goals, but was then replaced by Max Darj due to injury. Sweden would go on to win the tournament.

== Private ==
He is the son of Swedish handballer and world champion Jonas Persson.

== Honours ==
- Swedish Cup
  - Runner-up: 2022
- EHF Champions League
  - Winner: 2024-25

Individual awards

- Top Goalscorer Handbollsligan 2020–21 (177 goals)
- All-Star Team Handbollsligan 2020–21
