= 2012–13 Elitserien (men's handball) =

Swedish handball season

Elitserien
- 2012–13

Tournament information
- Sport: Handball
- Teams: 14

Final positions
- Champions: HK Drott (11th title)
- Runner-up: IFK Kristianstad

The 2012–13 Elitserien was the 79th season of the top division of Swedish handball. 14 teams competed in the league. The eight highest placed teams qualified for the playoffs, whereas teams 11–13 had to play relegation playoffs against teams from the second division, and team 14 was relegated automatically. Lugi HF won the regular season, but HK Drott won the playoffs and claimed their 11th Swedish title.

== League table ==
Pos	Team	Pld	W	D	L	GF	GA	GD	Pts
1	Lugi HF	32	20	4	8	912	779	133	44
2	IK Sävehof	32	21	0	11	932	834	98	42
3	IFK Kristianstad	32	19	3	10	848	778	70	41
4	HK Drott Halmstad	32	19	3	10	927	869	58	41
5	Alingsås HK	32	18	4	10	892	814	78	40
6	Eskilstuna Guif	32	16	5	11	881	821	60	37
7	Ystads IF	32	15	6	11	872	836	36	36
8	Hammarby IF	32	16	2	14	779	847	−68	34
9	Redbergslids IK	32	14	5	13	867	829	38	33
10	IFK Skövde	32	15	0	17	905	914	−9	30
11	HK Malmö	32	10	2	20	836	903	−67	22
12	HK Aranäs	32	9	1	22	827	895	−68	19
13	Skånela IF	32	8	1	23	769	931	−162	17
14	VästeråsIrsta HF	32	5	2	25	774	971	−197	12

== Playoffs bracket ==
Quarterfinals
2	IK Sävehof	40	26	27	30
6	Eskilstuna Guif	39	27	15	27
3	IFK Kristianstad	24	32	21	22	25
5	Alingsås HK	23	35	24	21	24
1	Lugi HF	25	33	31
8	Hammarby IF	23	25	30
4	HK Drott	27	20	22	22	33
7	Ystads IF	26	26	18	28	25

Semifinals
2	IK Sävehof	25	25	27	31	27
3	IFK Kristianstad	24	26	29	25	32
1	Lugi HF	31	25	32	27	23
4	HK Drott	28	26	27	30	24

Final
3	IFK Kristianstad	27
4	HK Drott	28

== Attendance ==
Team	Attendance
IFK Kristianstad	4135
Ystads IF HF	1642
Lugi HF	1620
Eskilstuna Guif	1552
HK Drott Halmstad	1441
IFK Skövde HK	1408
Hammarby IF	1379
HK Malmö	1339
IK Sävehof	1206
Redbergslids IK	1193
Alingsås HK	1183
Skånela IF	992
HK Aranäs	965
VästeråsIrsta HF	922
