= 2014–15 Elitserien (men's handball) =

Swedish handball season

Elitserien
- 2014–15

Tournament information
- Sport: Handball
- Teams: 14

Final positions
- Champions: IFK Kristianstad (5th title)
- Runner-up: Alingsås HK

The 2014–15 Elitserien was the 81st season of the top division of Swedish handball. 14 teams competed in the league. The eight highest placed teams qualified for the playoffs, whereas teams 11–13 had to play relegation playoffs against teams from the second division. H 43 Lund withdrew during the season due to bankruptcy. IFK Kristianstad won the regular season and also won the playoffs to claim their fifth Swedish title.

== League table ==
| Pos | Team | Pld | W | D | L | GF | GA | GD | Pts |
|---|---|---|---|---|---|---|---|---|---|
| 1 | IFK Kristianstad | 30 | 24 | 1 | 5 | 851 | 700 | 151 | 49 |
| 2 | Alingsås HK | 30 | 17 | 5 | 8 | 791 | 711 | 80 | 39 |
| 3 | Lugi HF | 30 | 17 | 3 | 10 | 762 | 774 | −12 | 37 |
| 4 | Eskilstuna Guif | 30 | 17 | 1 | 12 | 825 | 767 | 58 | 35 |
| 5 | Ystads IF | 30 | 17 | 0 | 13 | 740 | 751 | −11 | 34 |
| 6 | Redbergslids IK | 30 | 14 | 4 | 12 | 788 | 760 | 28 | 32 |
| 7 | Hammarby IF | 30 | 15 | 2 | 13 | 768 | 785 | −17 | 32 |
| 8 | HK Malmö | 30 | 13 | 4 | 13 | 755 | 721 | 34 | 30 |
| 9 | IK Sävehof | 30 | 13 | 3 | 14 | 774 | 750 | 24 | 29 |
| 10 | HK Drott Halmstad | 30 | 13 | 2 | 15 | 774 | 825 | −51 | 28 |
| 11 | IFK Skövde | 30 | 12 | 2 | 16 | 793 | 833 | −40 | 26 |
| 12 | Ricoh HK | 30 | 7 | 3 | 20 | 694 | 762 | −68 | 17 |
| 13 | Önnereds HK | 30 | 4 | 0 | 26 | 689 | 825 | −136 | 8 |
| 14 | H 43 Lund | 16 | 2 | 2 | 12 | 382 | 438 | −56 | 6 |

== Playoffs bracket ==
Quarterfinals
1 | IFK Kristianstad | 24 | 26 | 35 | 21 | 30
7 | Hammarby IF | 22 | 30 | 25 | 25 | 20
3 | Lugi HF | 27* | 29 | 23 | 24
5 | Ystads IF | 25 | 30 | 24 | 28
2 | Alingsås HK | 29 | 31 | 26
8 | HK Malmö | 20 | 25 | 21
4 | Eskilstuna Guif | 22 | 21 | 26 | 23 | 31
6 | Redbergslids IK | 18 | 24 | 25 | 26 | 25

Semifinals
1 | IFK Kristianstad | 27 | 20 | 24 | 26
5 | Ystads IF | 23 | 21 | 16 | 19
2 | Alingsås HK | 30 | 26 | 23
4 | Eskilstuna Guif | 21 | 22 | 18

Final
1 | IFK Kristianstad | 28
2 | Alingsås HK | 25

- An asterisk (*) denotes result after extra time

== Attendance ==
| Team | Attendance |
|---|---|
| IFK Kristianstad | 4822 |
| Alingsås HK | 1744 |
| IFK Skövde HK | 1722 |
| Ystads IF HF | 1544 |
| Eskilstuna Guif | 1487 |
| Hammarby IF | 1360 |
| Lugi HF | 1293 |
| IK Sävehof | 1180 |
| HK Drott Halmstad | 1093 |
| HK Malmö | 1036 |
| Redbergslids IK | 827 |
| H 43 Lund | 813 |
| Ricoh HK | 745 |
| Önnereds HK | 404 |
