= 2013–14 Elitserien (men's handball) =

Swedish handball season

Elitserien
- 2013–14

Tournament information
- Sport: Handball
- Teams: 14

Final positions
- Champions: Alingsås HK (2nd title)
- Runner-up: Lugi HF

The 2013–14 Elitserien was the 80th season of the top division of Swedish handball. 14 teams competed in the league. The eight highest placed teams qualified for the playoffs, whereas teams 11–13 had to play relegation playoffs against teams from the second division, and team 14 was relegated automatically. Eskilstuna Guif won the regular season, but Alingsås HK won the playoffs and claimed their second Swedish title.

== League table ==
Pos	Team	Pld	W	D	L	GF	GA	GD	Pts
1	Eskilstuna Guif	32	24	1	7	929	807	122	49
2	IFK Kristianstad	32	24	1	7	887	790	97	49
3	Alingsås HK	32	23	2	7	946	811	135	48
4	Lugi HF	32	20	3	9	901	814	87	43
5	IK Sävehof	32	19	4	9	955	857	98	42
6	HK Malmö	32	17	4	11	875	860	15	38
7	Hammarby IF	32	15	6	11	882	856	26	36
8	Redbergslids IK	32	16	2	14	886	847	39	34
9	HK Drott	32	11	6	15	912	940	−28	28
10	IFK Skövde	32	11	5	16	864	906	−42	27
11	Ystads IF	32	12	2	18	883	915	−32	26
12	H 43 Lund	32	7	4	21	864	992	−128	18
13	Önnereds HK	32	2	2	28	775	929	−154	6
14	Rimbo HK	32	1	2	29	882	1117	−235	4

== Playoffs bracket ==
Quarterfinals
1	Eskilstuna Guif	27	26	25
8	Redbergslids IK	26	21	24
3	Alingsås HK	21	23	32	23	28
6	HK Malmö	25	22	20	29	20
2	IFK Kristianstad	27	26	21	24	29
7	Hammarby IF	18	28	15	25	18
4	Lugi HF	30	24	33
5	IK Sävehof	28	21	26

Semifinals
1	Eskilstuna Guif	18	26	20	25
3	Alingsås HK	27	23	21	28
2	IFK Kristianstad	30	26	23	23
4	Lugi HF	23	29	24	25

Final
3	Alingsås HK	24
4	Lugi HF	22

== Attendance ==
Team	Attendance
IFK Kristianstad	4941
IFK Skövde HK	1771
Alingsås HK	1768
Ystads IF HF	1751
Eskilstuna Guif	1674
Lugi HF	1634
HK Malmö	1265
Hammarby IF	1239
IK Sävehof	1081
H 43 Lund	1049
HK Drott Halmstad	1027
Redbergslids IK	947
Rimbo HK	788
Önnereds HK	693
