= Jonas Persson (handballer) =

Swedish handball player (born 1969)

Personal information
- Full name: Bo Jonas Fredrik Persson
- Nationality: Swedish
- Born: 17 March 1969 (age 57) Lund, Sweden

Sport
- Sport: Handball
- Position: Left back
- Current club: Retired

Youth career
- Years: Team
- –: Lugi HF

Senior clubs
- Years: Team
- 1988-1998: Lugi HF
- 1998-2002: H43 Lund
- 2002-2005: Stavens IF
National team
Years	Team	Apps	(Gls)
1988-1992	Sweden	40	(68)
Medal record
World Championship
Gold medal – first place	1990 Czechoslovakia

Bo Jonas Fredrik "JP" Persson (born 17 March 1969) is a Swedish former handball player. He was part of the Swedish team that won the 1990 World Men's Handball Championship.

== Career ==
Jonas Persson started playing handball at Lugi HF, where he made his senior debut in 1986. He played for the team until 1998, playing 298 matches and scoring 159 goals for the club. Towards the end of his career he joined H43 Lund, which he helped getting promoted to the Elitserien in 2000. He retired in 2002, but kept playing for Stavstens IF in the lower divisions. After his playing career he has been a youth coach at H43.

At the 1990 World Men's Handball Championship he was part of the Swedish team that won gold medals. However he played only a single match at the tournament.

== Post handball career ==
After retiring he has worked as a police officer.

== Private ==
His son Isak Persson is also a handballer.
