= 1938–39 Allsvenskan (men's handball) =

Swedish handball season

Allsvenskan
- 1938–39

Tournament information
- Sport: Handball
- Teams: 8

Final positions
- Champions: Redbergslids IK

The 1938–39 Allsvenskan was the fifth season of the top division of Swedish handball. Eight teams competed in the league. Redbergslids IK won the league, but the title of Swedish Champions was awarded to the winner of Svenska mästerskapet. SoIK Hellas and GF Frithiof were relegated.

== League table ==
Pos	Team	Pld	W	D	L	GF	GA	GD	Pts
1	Redbergslids IK	14	11	2	1	196	116	80	24
2	Majornas IK	14	12	0	2	235	140	95	24
3	Stockholms-Flottans IF	14	7	0	7	123	144	−21	14
4	Flottans IF Karlskrona	14	6	1	7	145	150	−5	13
5	Upsala Studenters IF	14	6	0	8	131	150	−19	12
6	IFK Lund	14	6	0	8	136	162	−26	12
7	SoIK Hellas	14	3	1	10	113	146	−33	7
8	GF Frithiof	14	3	0	10	127	198	−71	6

== Attendance ==
Team	Attendance
Majornas IK	896
Redbergslids IK	728
Upsala Studenters IF	688
Flottans IF Karlskrona	683
Stockholms-Flottans IF	487
IFK Lund	445
SoIK Hellas	441
GF Frithiof	440
