= Ebba Engdahl =

Swedish handball player (born 1991)

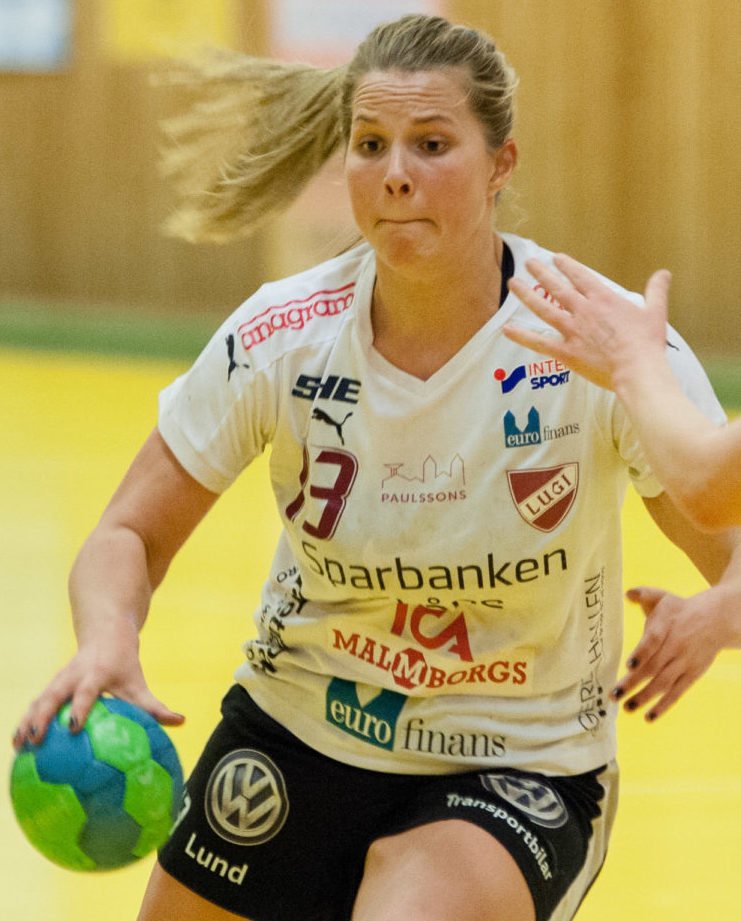

Personal information
- Full name: Ebba Engdahl
- Nationality: Swedish
- Born: 29 October 1991 (age 34) Lund, Sweden
- Height: 1.78 m (5 ft 10 in)

Sport
- Sport: Handball
- Position: Centre back
- Current club: Lugi HF
- Number: 11

Senior clubs
- Years: Team
- 2010–2013: H43/Lundagård
- 2013–: Lugi HF
National team
- Years: Team
- 2017–: Sweden

Ebba Engdahl (born 29 October 1991) is a Swedish handballer who plays for Lugi HF and the Sweden national team.

== Achievements ==
- Swedish Elitserien:
  - Bronze Medalist: 2016, 2017
