= Olof Ask =

Swedish handballer (born 1982)

Personal information
- Full name: Olof Ask
- Nationality: Swedish (Sweden)
- Born: March 18, 1982 (age 44) Lund, Sweden
- Height: 191 cm (75 in)

Sport
- Sport: Handball
- Position: Line player
- Current club: Retired

Youth career
- Years: Team
- –: KFUM Lundagård

Senior clubs
- Years: Team
- 2001-2007: H43 Lund
- 2007-2010: GOG Svendborg
- 2010: KIF Kolding
- 2010-2011: AaB Håndbold
- 2011-2014: OV Helsingborg
National team
| Years | Team | Apps | (Gls) |
| 2006-2010 | Sweden | 11 | (9) |

Olof Ask (born March 18, 1982) is a Swedish former handballer. Ask played 11 matches for the Swedish national handball team, scoring 9 goals.

== Career ==
As a junior he played for KFUM Lundagård. He played 6 seasons for H43 Lund until 2007. Here he won the MVP award in the 2005–06 season in the Swedish top division. He debuted for the Swedish national team in 2006.

In 2007 he joined GOG Svendborg in Danish Handball League. When the club went bankrupt in 2010 he joined Danish defending champions KIF Kolding. He only stayed there for a short while, and joined AaB Håndbold where he played the rest of the 2010–11 season. In 2011 he returned to Sweden and stopped being a full time professional handball player. He played for OV Helsingborg while also working as an accountant. He retired in 2014.
