= Fredrik Lindahl (handballer) =

Swedish handball player (born 1983)

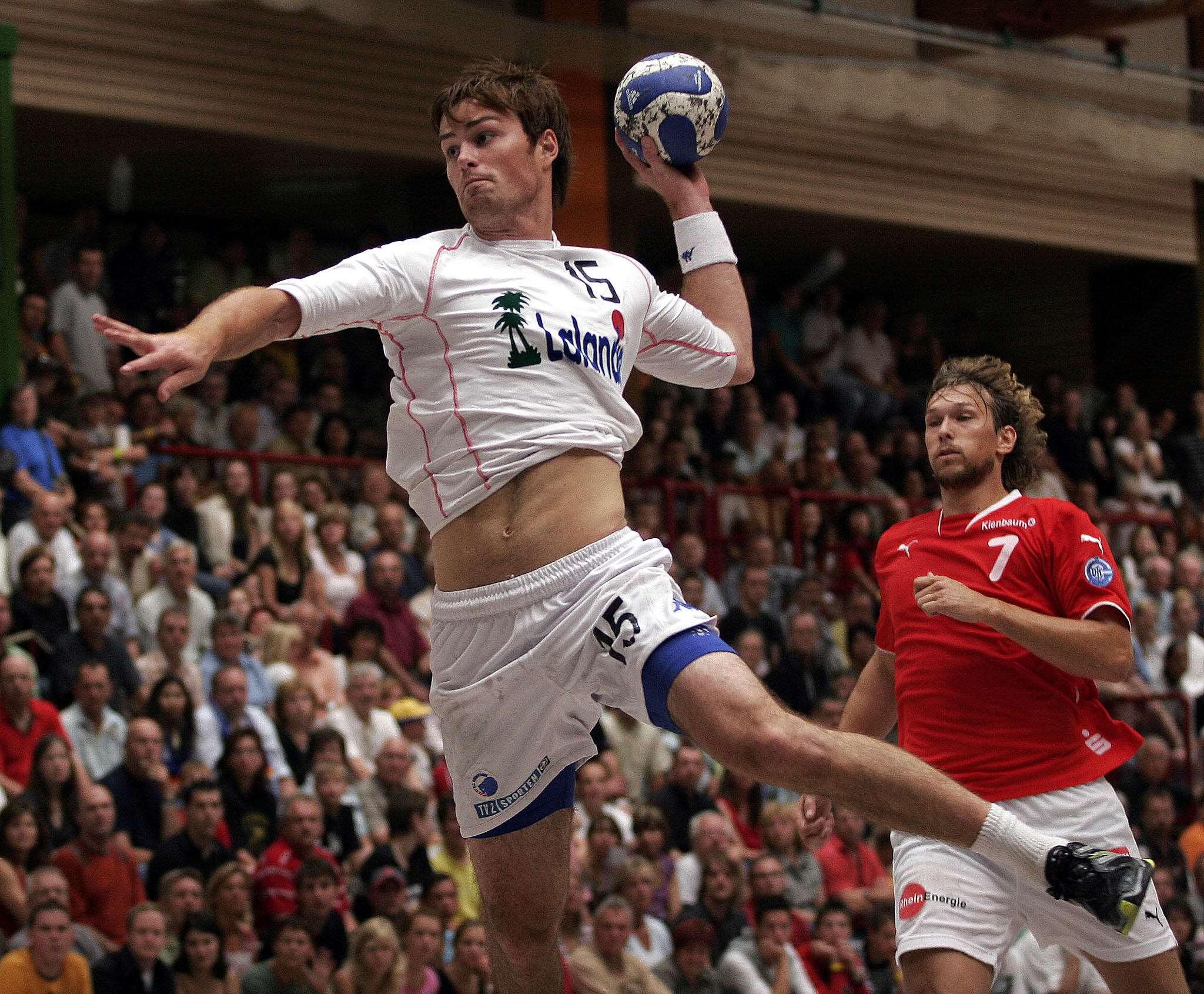
- Lindahl in 2007

Personal information
- Full name: Carl Fredrik Petter Lindahl
- Nationality: Swedish
- Born: 13 August 1983 (age 43) Hjo, Sweden
- Height: 189 cm (74 in)

Sport
- Sport: Handball
- Position: Right wing
- Current club: HK Malmö
- Number: 15

Senior clubs
- Years: Team
- 2000-2006: Redbergslids IK
- 2006-2010: FCK Håndbold
- 2010-2023: HK Malmö
National team
Years	Team	Apps	(Gls)
2003-2008	Sweden	58	(107)

Fredrik Lindahl (born 16 September 1983) is a Swedish former handball player for HK Malmö and the Swedish national men's handball team.

He won the Danish Championship in 2008, with FCK Håndbold. He has previously played for Redbergslids IK in the best league of his homeland. He retired in 2023 after 12 seasons at HK Malmö and more than 1000 appearances in the Swedish league.
