= Fredrik Lindahl =

Fredrik Lindahl may refer to:

- Fredrik Lindahl (handballer)
- Fredrik Lindahl (politician)
