= Kristján Andrésson =

Icelandic handball player (born 1981)

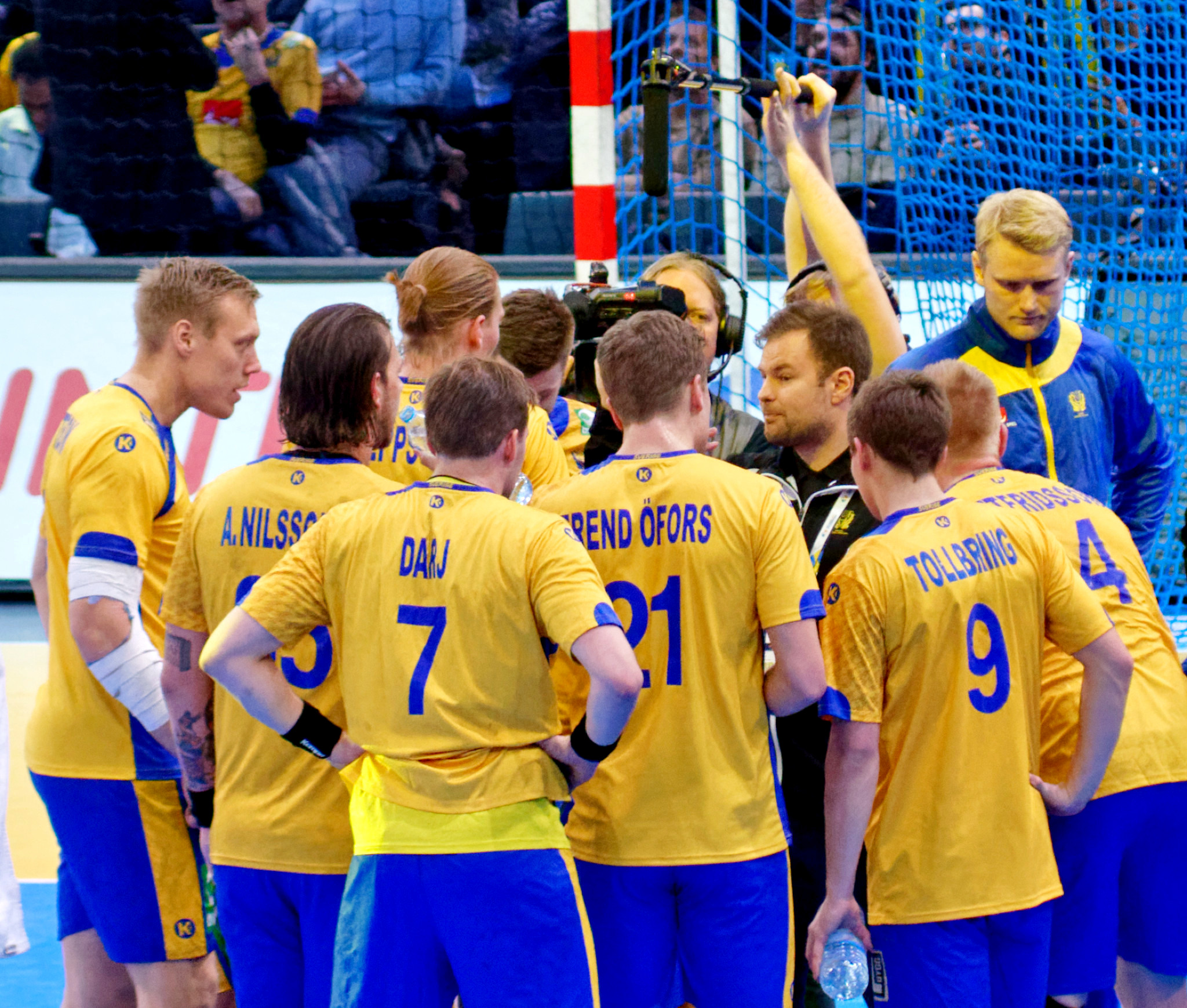

Personal information
- Nationality: Icelandic; Swedish
- Born: 27 March 1981 (age 45) Eskilstuna, Sweden
- Height: 1.82 m (6 ft 0 in)

Sport
- Sport: Handball
- Position: Centre back

Senior clubs
- Years: Team
- –1999: HK Eskil
- 1999–2005: IF Guif
National team
Years	Team	Apps	(Gls)
2004	Iceland	13	(10)

Teams managed
- 2007–2016: Eskilstuna Guif
- 2016–2020: Sweden
- 2019–2020: Rhein-Neckar Löwen

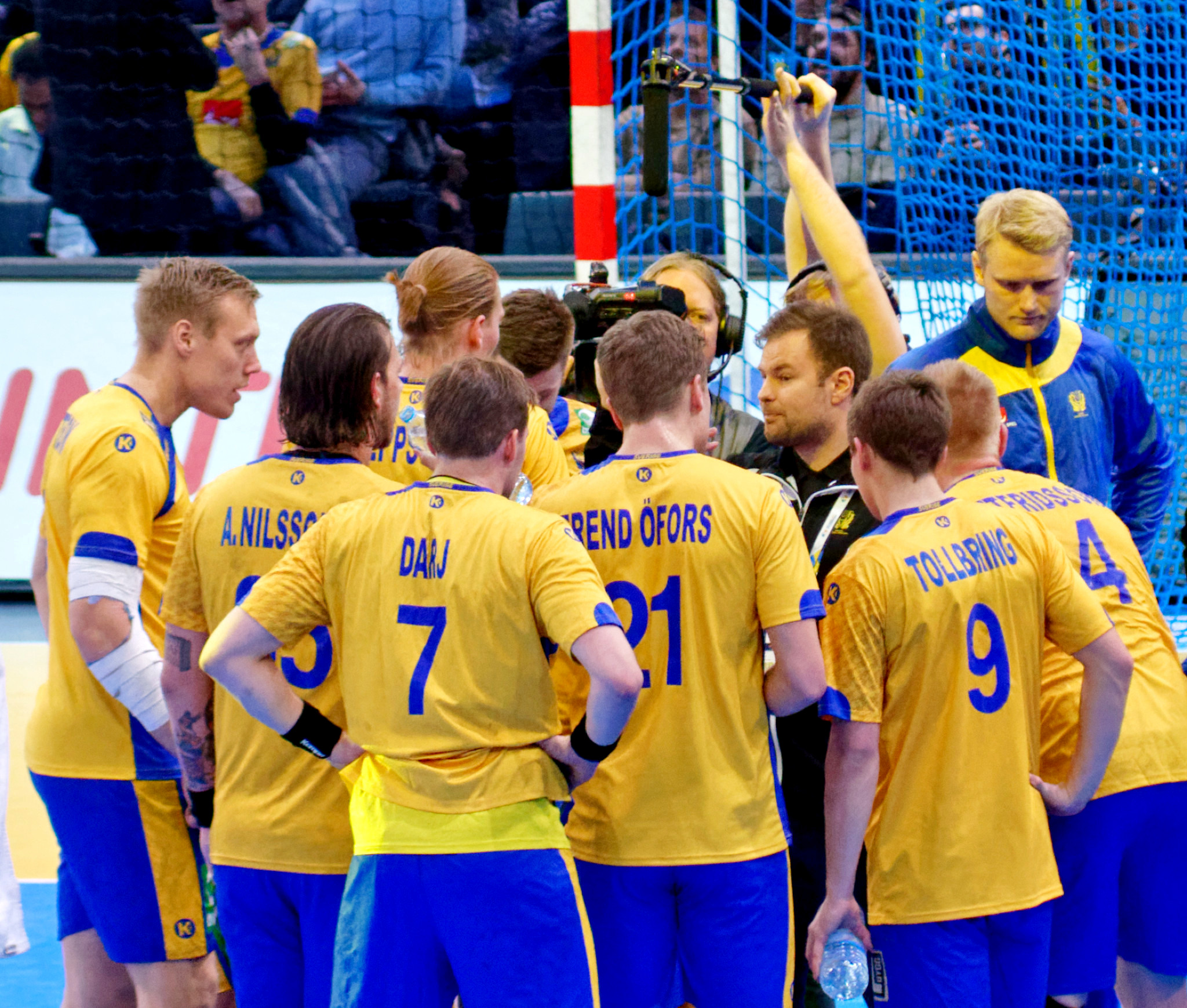
2017 World Men's Handball Championship 2017

Kristján Andrésson (born 27 March 1981) is a Swedish-born Icelandic retired handball player and ex coach of the Swedish national team.

He competed in the 2004 Summer Olympics. Until 2020 he was the head coach for the Swedish national team.

He played several games for the Icelandic national team, including at the 2004 Olympics. He retired as a player in 2005 due to injury problems. He coached Eskilstuna Guif from 2007 to 2016. When he accepted the Sweden job, he became the fifth Icelander to be the active coach of a foreign national team at the time.
