= Pelle Linders =

Swedish handball player (born 1975)

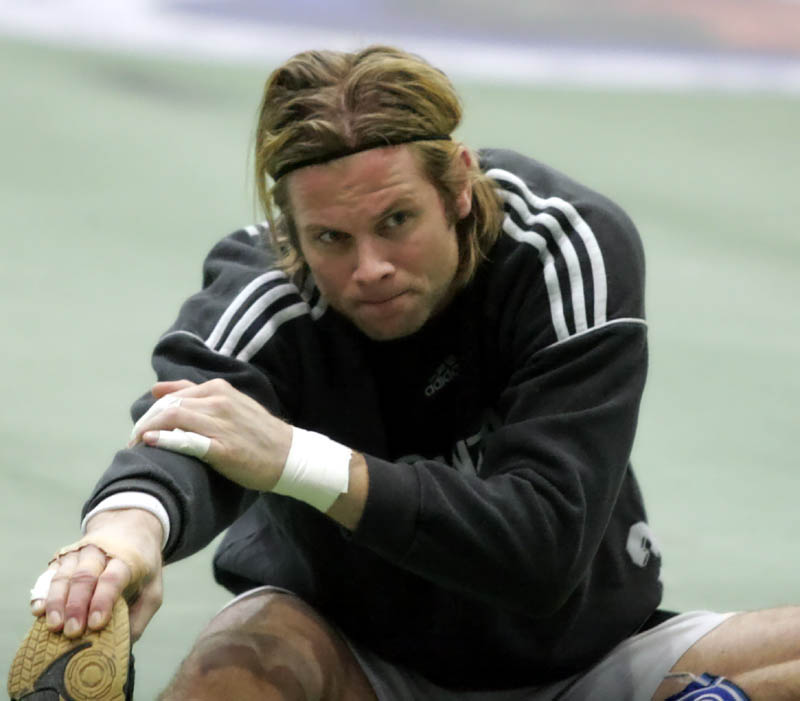

Personal information
- Full name: Pelle Linders
- Nationality: Swedish (Sweden)
- Born: September 21, 1975 (age 51) Onsala, Sweden
- Height: 194 cm (76 in)

Sport
- Sport: Handball
- Position: Line player
- Current club: Retired

Senior clubs
- Years: Team
- 1981-1995: HK Aranäs
- 1995-2000: IFK Skövde HK
- 2000-2005: KIF Kolding
- 2005-2007: THW Kiel
- 2007-2010: FCK Håndbold
- 2010-2011: HK Aranäs
- 2017: HK Aranäs B team
National team
| Years | Team | Apps | (Gls) |
| – | Sweden | 73 | (123) |
- Updated on 2022

Pelle Linders (born September 21, 1975) is a Swedish retired handball player, who retired in 2011. In 2008 when playing for Danish Handball League side FCK Håndbold he won the Danish Championship. He played for numerous clubs, including HK Aranäs, IFK Skövde in his homeland and FCK Håndbold's Danish League rivals from KIF Kolding. He also had a spell at German League side THW Kiel, who he helped to a Champions League victory.

Linders made 73 appearances for the Swedish national handball team, scoring 123.

In 2017 he made a short comeback as an amateur player in the Swedish 2nd Division.
