= LIF Lindesberg =

Swedish handball club

- Full name: Lindeskolans IF Lindesberg
- Short name: LIF
- Founded: 1966; 59 years ago
- Arena: Lindesberg Arena, Lindesberg
- Capacity: 2,500
- Club colours
Home	Away

Lindeskolans IF Lindesberg is a Swedish handball club from Lindesberg. As of 2017–18, they play in Allsvenskan, the second highest level.

== History ==
LIF Lindesberg were founded in 1966.

In 2004–05, they finished third in Allsvenskan and qualified for promotion playoffs. They lost the series against Djurgården, but were still promoted after Kroppskultur withdrew from the top division. In 2005–06, the club made their debut in the top division, at the time known as Elitserien. They finished sixth and qualified for the playoffs, where they were eliminated in the quarter-finals by Sävehof. In 2006–07, they finished seventh in Elitserien and again qualified the playoffs. They were defeated in the quarter-finals by Hammarby. In 2007–08 they improved to fifth in the league, but were once more eliminated in the quarter-finals by Sävehof. In 2008–09 the club finished eighth in the league and qualified for the playoffs for the fourth consecutive season. However, they were once again defeated in the quarter-finals, this time by Alingsås. In 2009–10, Lindesberg finished 12th in Elitserien and had to play in the qualification league to avoid relegation. They won the qualification league and remained in the top division. However, in 2010–11 they finished last in Elitserien and were relegated automatically.

In the following season, the club finished fourth in Allsvenskan and qualified for the qualification league. However, they finished last in the qualification league and remained in Allsvenskan. In 2015–16, Lindesberg finished fourth in Allsvenskan and qualified for the playoffs for promotion to Elitserien, but they lost the series against Skövde and stayed in Allsvenskan.

== Kits ==
HOME
2019–20	2020–
