= Tommy Atterhäll =

Swedish handball player (born 1978)

Personal information
- Full name: Tommy Atterhäll
- Nationality: Swedish
- Born: 9 October 1978 (age 48) Gothenburg, Sweden
- Height: 180 cm (71 in)

Sport
- Sport: Handball
- Position: Left wing

Senior clubs
- Years: Team
- –2002: HP Warta
- 2002–2007: IK Sävehof
- 2007–2010: FCK Håndbold
- 2010–2017: HK Aranäs
National team
Years	Team	Apps	(Gls)
2006–2007	Sweden	6	(11)

Teams managed
- 2013–2017: HK Aranäs (assistant)
- 2017–2022: Önnereds HK

Tommy Atterhäll (born 9 October 1978) is a Swedish handball coach and former player.
