= Max Darj =

Swedish handball player (born 1991)

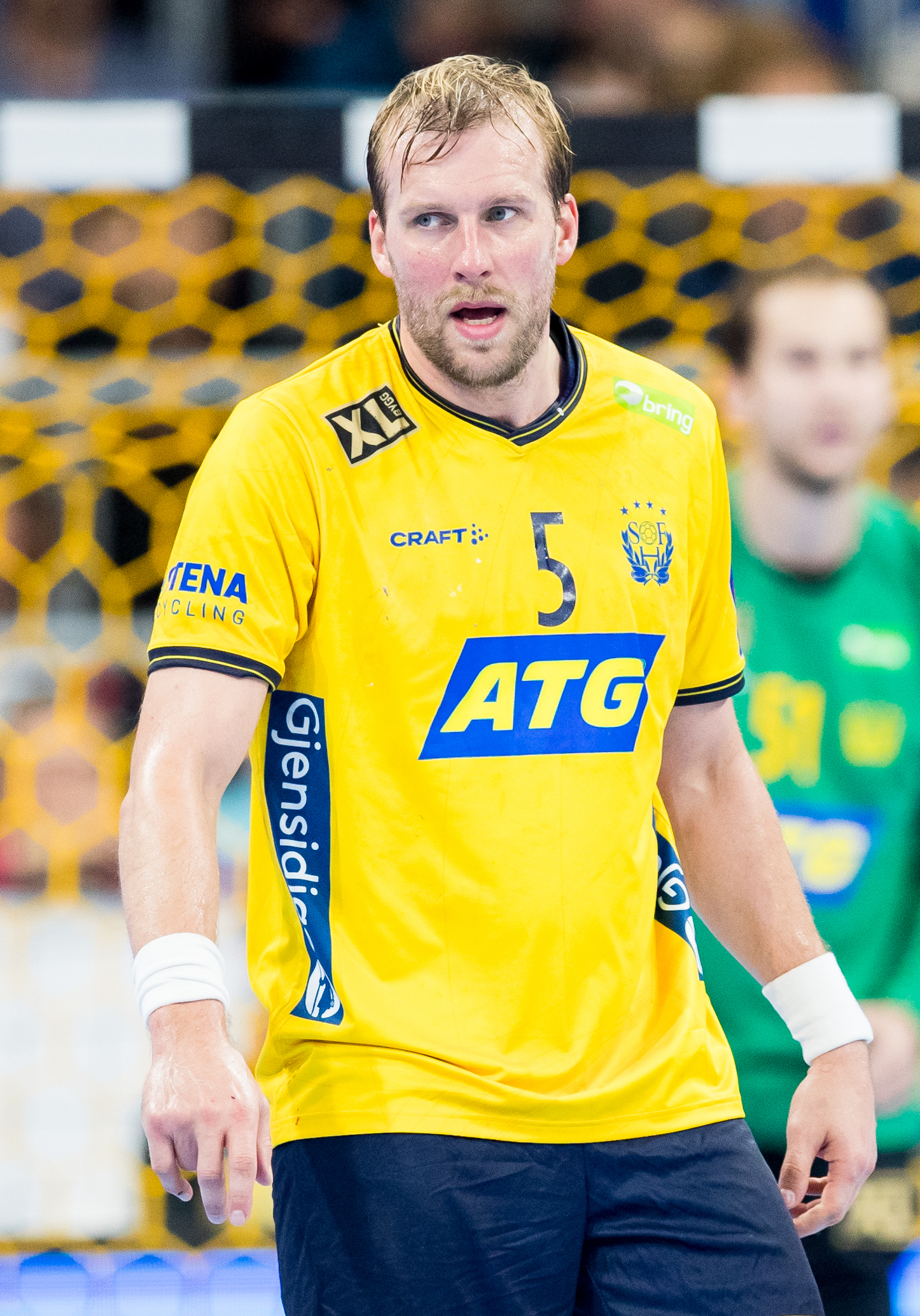
- Darj with the Swedish national team in 2022

Personal information
- Nationality: Swedish
- Born: 27 September 1991 (age 35) Gothenburg, Sweden
- Height: 1.92 m (6 ft 4 in)

Sport
- Sport: Handball
- Position: Pivot
- Current club: Füchse Berlin
- Number: 5

Youth career
- Years: Team
- –2009: Stenungsunds HK

Senior clubs
- Years: Team
- 2009–2017: Alingsås HK
- 2017–2022: Bergischer HC
- 2022–: Füchse Berlin
National team
Years	Team	Apps	(Gls)
2014–	Sweden	132	(148)
Medal record
World Championship
Silver medal – second place	2021 Egypt
European Championship
Gold medal – first place	2022 Hungary/Slovakia
Silver medal – second place	2018 Croatia
Bronze medal – third place	2024 Germany
- Updated on 14 January 2026

Max Darj (born 27 September 1991) is a Swedish handball player for Füchse Berlin and the Swedish national team.

== Club career ==
Darj began his professional handball career at Swedish club Alingsås HK in 2009. He won the Swedish Championship with the club in 2014. Darj joined German club Bergischer HC in 2017. He moved to Füchse Berlin in 2022 and won the EHF European League in his debut season with the club.

Two seasons later he won the 2024-25 Handball-Bundesliga, which was the first in club history. The same season he played in the 2024-25 EHF Champions League final, where Füchse lost to league rivals SC Magdeburg.

== International career ==
Darj made his debut for the Swedish national team in 2014. He won the 2022 European Championship, finished second at the 2018 European Championship and 2021 World Championship, and placed third at the 2024 European Championship with the national team. Darj represented Sweden at the 2020 Olympic Games.

== Honours ==
=== Club ===
Alingsås HK

- Swedish Championship: 2015

Füchse Berlin

- Handball-Bundesliga: 2025
- EHF European League: 2023

=== International ===
- EHF European Championship
  - Gold: 2022
  - Silver: 2018
  - Bronze: 2024
- IHF World Championship
  - Silver: 2021

=== Individual ===
- Swedish Handballer of the Year: 2019
