= Allsvenskan (men's handball) =

Swedish handball division

- Founded: 1990; 36 years ago
- No. of teams: 14
- Country: Sweden
- Promotion to: Handbollsligan
- Relegation to: Division 1

Allsvenskan is the Swedish second division in men's team handball. Earlier, the name was used by the top division between 1934 and 1990. The league is organized by the Swedish Handball Federation.

== Format ==
Since the 2007-08 season the league has had the same format. The league has 14 teams which meet in a double round-robin, resulting in 26 rounds. The winner of the Allsvenskan is promoted to the Handbollsligan.

The 2nd, 3rd and 4th place enter a qualification play-off mini-tournament against the 11th, 12th and 13th placed teams in the Handbollsligan. The bottom two teams are relegated to Division 1. The 12th and 13th placed team enter a relegation playoff.

== Teams for season 2023–24 ==
Location of teams in 2023/2024 Allsvenskan
- Anderstorps SK
- HK Drott
- HK Torslanda
- HK Varberg
- IFK Karlskrona
- IFK Ystad
- Kungälvs HK
- LIF Lindesberg
- OV Helsingborg
- Redbergslids IK
- Skånela IF
- Tyresö Handboll
- Vinslövs HK
- VästeråsIrsta HF

== See also ==
- Allsvenskan (women's handball)
