= Allsvenskan (women's handball) =

Women's team handball league in Sweden

- Sport: handball
- Founded: 2010; 16 years ago
- No. of teams: 12
- Country: Sweden
- Level on pyramid: 2
- Promotion to: Handbollsligan
- Relegation to: Division 1

Allsvenskan is the Swedish second division in women's team handball. Earlier, the name was used by the top division. The league is organized by the Swedish Handball Federation.

Until 2010 the second highest tier was Division 1, which was composed of two sections, Nörra (northern) and Sôdra (southern).

== Format ==
The league has 12 teams which meet in a double round-robin, resulting in 22 rounds. The winner of the Allsvenskan is promoted to the Handbollsligan.

The 2nd enters a play-off against the second-to-last (11th) placed team in the Handbollsligan, where they play best of five to decide which team will play next season in the top division.

The bottom two teams are relegated to Division 1. The 10th and 9th placed teams enter a relegation playoff.

== See also ==
- Allsvenskan (men's handball)
