= HF Karlskrona =

Swedish handball club

- Full name: HF Karlskrona
- Founded: January 23, 1938; 88 years ago
- Arena: Brinova Arena Karlskrona, Karlskrona
- Capacity: 2,500
- President: Maria Nilsson
- Head coach: Mathias Ekstrand
- League: Allsvenskan
- 2024-25: 4th
- Club colours
Home	Away

HF Karlskrona is a Swedish handball club based in Karlskrona, founded in 1938 under the name Hästö IF. In 2014 they changed their name to HIF Karlskrona. In 2022 they merged with the club Karlskrona Handboll, under the new name HF Karlskrona.

Location of HF Karlskrona

== Sports Hall information ==
- Name: – Brinova Arena Karlskrona
- City: – Karlskrona
- Capacity: – 2500
- Address: – Björkholmen, 371 33 Karlskrona, Sweden

== Team ==
=== Current squad ===
Squad for the 2026–27 season

Goalkeepers

- (Sweden) Emil Arthursson

Left Wingers

- (Faroe Islands) Leivur Mortensen

Right Wingers

- (Sweden) Emil Hansson

Line players

Left Backs

- (Iceland) Arnór Viðarsson

Central Backs

- (Faroe Islands) Tróndur Mikkelsen
- (Sweden) Alex Andersson

Right Backs

- (Sweden) Jonathan Andersson

=== Transfers ===
Transfers for the 2026–27 season

Joining

- (Faroe Islands) Leivur Mortensen (LW) from (Denmark) HC København
- (Sweden) Alex Andersson (CB) from (Sweden) Västerås HF

Leaving

- (Iceland) Thorgils Baldursson (LP) to (Spain) CB Caserío Ciudad Real
- (Sweden) Isak Larsson (CB) to (Denmark) Nordsjælland Håndbold
- (Sweden) Noah Martinsson (LW) to (Spain) BM Villa de Aranda

=== Transfer History ===
Transfers for the 2025–26 season

Joining

- (Faroe Islands) Tróndur Mikkelsen (CB) from (Norway) Kristiansand Topphåndball
- (Iceland) Arnór Viðarsson (LB) from (Denmark) Fredericia HK
- (Sweden) Emil Hansson (RW) from (Norway) Drammen HK
- (Sweden) Jonathan Andersson (RB) from (Sweden) IFK Ystad HK
- (Sweden) Emil Arthursson (GK) from (Sweden) HK Drott

Leaving

- (Iceland) Dagur Sverrir Kristjánsson (RW) to (Sweden) Vinslövs HK
