= HK Aranäs =

Swedish handball club

- Full name: Handbollsklubben Aranäs
- Founded: 20 February 1947; 79 years ago
- Arena: Kungsbacka sporthall
- Head coach: Rustan Lundbäck (women's); Magnus Siglev (men's)
- League: Handbollsligan (women's); Handbollsligan (men's)
- 2024-25: 10th (women's), 13th (men's)
- Club colours
Home	Away

Handbollsklubben Aranäs (HK Aranäs) is a handball klub from Kungsbacka, Hallands län, Sweden. It was founded on 20 February 1947. It is known for its extensive youth development program, which is the second biggest in Sweden, only trailing IK Sävehof.

In the 2010-2011 season the men's team played their first season in the top division of Sweden, the Elitserien.

== History ==
Handbollsklubben Aranäs was founded on February 20th 1947 at a meeting at Gårdskullavägen in Kungsbacka by Per-Erik Persson, Rune Bergbom, Bengt Landin, Lars Olmarker and Rolf Svensson. On August 14th at the general assembly Elon Josefsson joined the club the club. He was active in the club for 50 years as a board member and was the chairperson for 20 years.

The women's team was founded in 1957.

== Team ==
=== Current squad ===
Squad for the 2026–27 season

Goalkeepers
Left Wingers
Right Wingers
Line players

Left Backs
Central Backs
Right Backs

=== Transfers ===
Transfers for the 2026–27 season

Joining

Leaving

- (Sweden) Nils Mellert (LP) to (Sweden) OV Helsingborg HK
- (Sweden) Alvin Lindvall (RW) to (Sweden) OV Helsingborg HK
- (Sweden) Razmus Nyman (CB) to (Sweden) Önnereds HK

== Notable former players ==
- Tommy Atterhäll (2010–2017)
- Niclas Barud (–2004)
- Daniel Bergqvist (2013–2023)
- Alexander Borgstedt (2008–2012)
- Mathias Franzén (–1995)
- Mikael Franzén (–1994)
- Magnus Lindén (–1996)
- Pelle Linders (–1995, 2010–2011)
- Rickard Lönn (–2008)
- Pontus Mellegård (2014–2018)
- Fredrik Ohlander (–1996)
- Hans Olsson
- Mikael Sundlin (–1995)
- Peter Swenson (–1997)
- Hampus Wanne (2011–2013)
