= Alingsås HK =

Swedish handball club

- Full name: Alingsås Handbollklubb
- Short name: AHK
- Founded: April 9, 1973; 53 years ago
- Arena: Estrad Alingsås
- Capacity: 2,800
- Head coach: Mattias Flodman
- League: Handbollsligan
- 2024-25: 9th
Home	Away

Alingsås HK is a handball club from Alingsås, Sweden. They currently compete in Handbollsligan. They have won two Swedish championships, in 2009 and 2014.

== History ==
The club was founded on 9 April 1973, and overtook Alingsås IF's position in the league in Division 3, after they had closed their handball department.

In the 1976-77 season the team was promoted to Division 2. In the 1990-91 they were promoted for the first time to the top league. The team was however disqualified two days later, after a player had been found to be dopping with pain killers.

In 1998 the team was then promoted again, and could thus play in the top league for the first time. In the 1998-99 the team surprisingly finished 3rd in the regular season, and 5th in the Championship group. They were however knocked out in semifinal by eventual winners HK Drott. Their coach Anders Fältnäs left the club the season after and was replaced by the 29 year old coach Per Johansson.

In the 2001-02 season the team was relegated, but quickly returned to the league. In the 2003-04 season the team was back, but it only lasted for a single season.

From the 2005-06 season onwards the team became established in the top league.

In the 2008-09 season, the team won their first Swedish championsship, when they beat IF Guif in the final 29-26.

In 2012 Mikael Franzén became the head coach, and he managed to lead the team to their second Swedish championship in his second season, beating Lugi HF 24-22 in the final.

In the 2022-23 season Alingsås HK's women's team were promoted to the Allsvenkan, the second tier, for the first time ever.

Location of Alingsås HK

== Kits ==
HOME
2014–16	2016–19	2019-

AWAY
2014–15	2018–19	2019–

== Achievements ==
- Handbollsligan:
  - Winners (2): 2009, 2014
  - Runners-up (4): 2015, 2016, 2017, 2019

== Sports Hall information ==
- Name: Estrad Alingsås
- City: Alingsås
- Capacity: 2800
- Address: Bryggaregatan 2, 441 30 Alingsås

== Team ==
=== Current squad ===
Squad for the 2019-20 season

Goalkeeper

- 1 (Sweden) Niklas Kraft
- 12 (Sweden) Gustav Skagerling
- 16 (Sweden) Pontus Axelsson
- 16 (Sweden) Kenan Omerovic

Wingers
LW

- 13 (Finland) Benjamin Helander
- 25 (Sweden) Alexander Wedin
- 25 (Sweden) Andreas Berg

RW

- 4 (Sweden) Samuel Lindberg
- 18 (Sweden) Erik Andreasson
- 28 (Sweden) Isak Hane

Pivots

- 19 (Sweden) Alexander Regen
- 22 (Sweden) Axel Franzén
- 26 (Sweden) Niclas Barud

Back players
LB

- 13 (Sweden) Jacob Lundahl
- 13 (Sweden) Daniel Blomgren
- 88 (Iceland) Aron Dagur Pálsson

CB

- 7 (Sweden) Felix Claar
- 11 (Sweden) Fredrik Teern
- 31 (Sweden) William Andersson Moberg

RB

- 21 (Sweden) Johan Nilsson
- 27 (Sweden) Andreas Lang

=== Transfers ===
Transfers for the 2026–27 season

Joining

- (Sweden) Niklas Kraft (GK) from (Denmark) Ribe-Esbjerg HH

Leaving

- (Sweden) Gustav Jönne (LP) to (Norway) Runar Sandefjord
- (Sweden) Albin Hagglund (CB) to (Norway) Kristiansand Topphåndball
- (Sweden) Emil Holmberg Schatzl (GK) to (Denmark) TTH Holstebro

=== Transfer History ===
Transfers for the 2025–26 season

Joining

- (Sweden) August Wiger (CB) from (Denmark) Sønderjyske Handbold
- (Sweden) Arvid Boqvist (LB) from (Sweden) Västerås Irsta HF

Leaving

- (Sweden) Oscar Gentzel (LB) to (Germany) HSG Nordhorn-Lingen
- (Sweden) Jacob Lundahl (LP) to (Germany) TuS N-Lübbecke
- (Sweden) Albert Månsson (CB) to (Sweden) Lugi HF
- (Sweden) Jakob Markoff (CB) to (Sweden) Lugi HF

=== Technical staff ===
Staff for the 2019-20 season

- Head Coach: (Sweden) Mikael Franzén
- Assistant Coach: (Sweden) Mattias Flodman
- Goalkeeping Coach: (Sweden) Patrik Karlsson
- Team Leader: (Sweden) Lena Lindqvist

== Former club members ==
=== Notable former players ===
- (Sweden) Mikael Aggefors (2009–2016)
- (Sweden) Marcus Ahlm (1998–2000)
- (Sweden) Niclas Barud (2017–)
- (Sweden) Oscar Bergendahl (2014–2018)
- (Sweden) Felix Claar (2013–2020)
- (Sweden) Max Darj (2009–2017)
- (Sweden) Emil Frend Öfors (2014–2017)
- (Sweden) Jesper Konradsson (2011–2017)
- (Sweden) Gustav Rydergård (2006–2009)

== Former coaches ==
Seasons	Coach	Country
1994–1999	Anders Fältnäs	(Sweden)
1999–2002	Per Johansson	(Sweden)
2002–2005	Torbjörn "Lurken" Johansson	(Sweden)
2005–2006	Tore Brännberg	(Sweden)
2006–2012	Robert Wedberg	(Sweden)
2012–2024	Mikael Franzén	(Sweden)
2024-	Mattias Flodman	(Sweden)
