= HK Malmö =

Swedish handball club

- Short name: Handbollklubben Malmö Handboll
- Founded: 2007
- Arena: Baltiska Hallen, Malmö
- Capacity: 4,000
- President: Jörgen Rasmusson
- Head coach: Björn Sätherström
- League: Handbollsligan
- 2024-25: 2nd
- Club colours
Home	Away

HK Malmö is a handball club based in Malmö, Sweden. The club was formed in May 2007 as a merger of Malmö HP and IFK Malmö Handboll. The men's plays in the highest handball division in Sweden, while the women's team play in the second tier.

The club has activities at both elite and grass roots level, both adult and youth level, and men's and women's teams. It also has a Para handball and 30 youth teams. The club runs the handball academy Malmö idrottsgymnasium.

== History ==
The club has quickly established itself at the top of Swedish handball on the men's side. Their first season in the top flight was the 2007-08, where the team was relegated. They did however come back in the 2009-2010 season. In the 2017-18 season the club reached the semifinal of the Swedish championship for the first time, where they lost to IFK Kristianstad.

Location of HK Malmö

== Sports Hall information ==
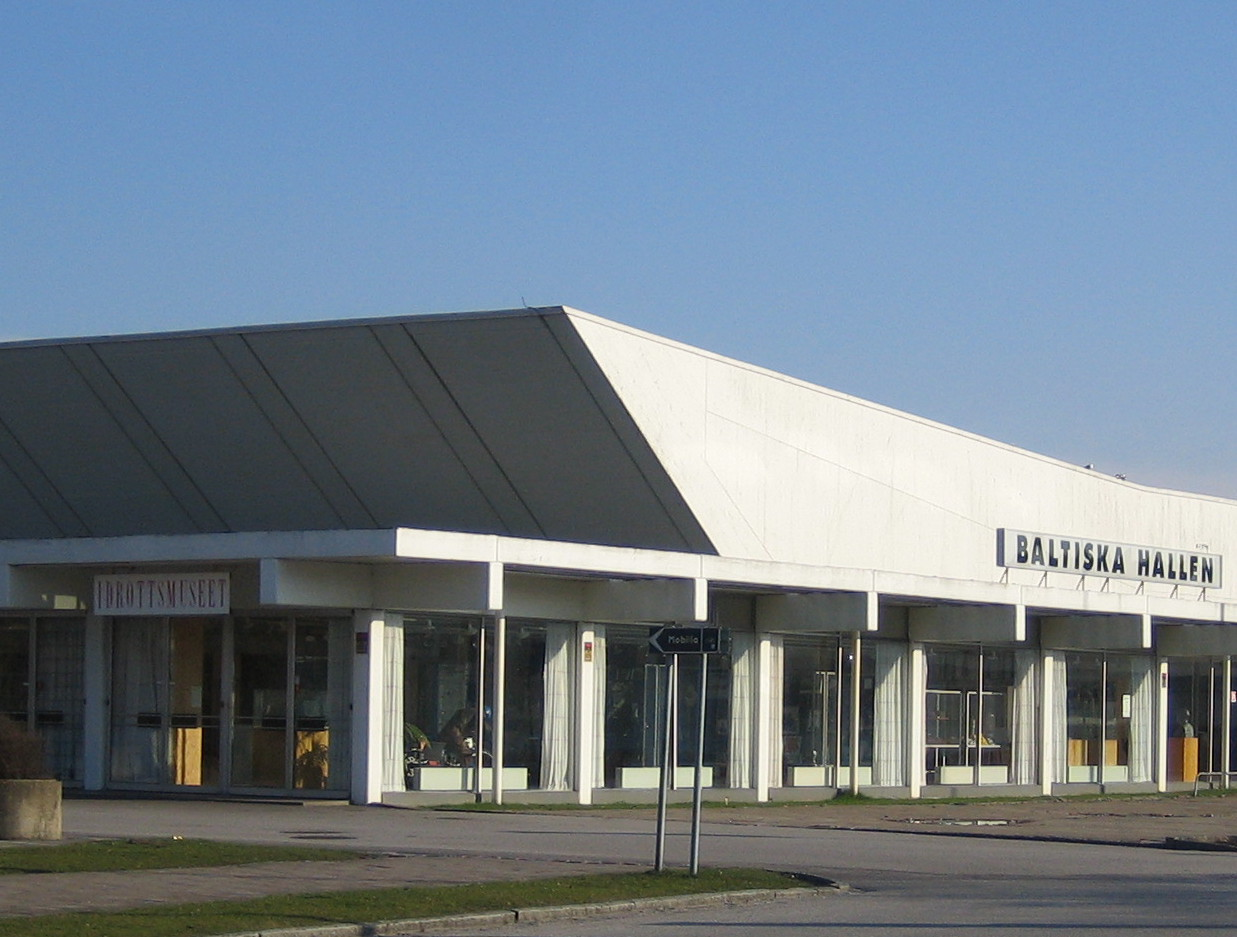
Home hall: Baltiska Hallen

- Name: – Baltiska Hallen
- City: – Malmö
- Capacity: – 4000
- Address: – Eric Perssons väg 8a, 217 62 Malmö, Sweden

== Kits ==
HOME
2010–11

== Men's team ==
=== Current squad ===
Squad for the 2021-22 season:

Goalkeepers

- 16 (Sweden) Adam Krantz
- 12 (Sweden) Erik Helgsten
- 18 (Sweden) Ebbe Hakansson
- 1 (Sweden) Dan Beutler

Wingers
LW

- 18 (Sweden) Adam Tumba
- 9 (Sweden) Nils Pettersson

RW

- 21 (Sweden) Martin Boija
- 6 (Sweden) Hampus Jildenbäck
- 17 (Sweden) Charles Hugoson

Line Players

- 11 (Sweden) Kassem Awad
- 4 (Sweden) Max Santos
- 24 (Sweden) Hampus Nygren

Back Players
LB

- 33 (Norway) Inge Aas Eriksen
- 25 (Sweden) Anton Blickhammar

CB

- 13 (Sweden) Daniel Ekman
- 7 (Sweden) Tim Hilding
- 3 (Sweden) Arvid Johansson

RB

- 10 (Sweden) Magnus Persson
- 15 (Sweden) Fredrik Lindahl

=== Transfers ===
Transfers for the 2026–27 season

Joining

- (Spain) Aldo Pagliotta (LP) from (Portugal) CF Belenenses
- (Germany) Thilo Knutzen (LB) on loan from (Germany) SG Flensburg-Handewitt

Leaving

- (Sweden) Isak Persson (RW) to (Denmark) GOG Håndbold
- (Sweden) Nikola Roganović (LB) to (Germany) VfL Gummersbach
- (Sweden) Felix Montebovi (LW) to (Germany) ThSV Eisenach
- (Sweden) Tim Hilding (CB) to (Germany) Bergischer HC
- (Sweden) Hugo Stuivers (LP) to (Denmark) Skjern Håndbold

=== Transfer History ===
Transfers for the 2025–26 season

Joining

- (Norway) Carl Tönnesen (RB) from (Sweden) Ystads IF
- (Sweden) Isak Persson (RW) from (Germany) SC Magdeburg
- (Sweden) Nikola Roganovic (LB) from (Sweden) Eskilstuna Guif

Leaving

- (Norway) Truls Grotta (CB) to (Sweden) IK Sävehof
- (Sweden) Kristian Zetterlund (GK) to (Denmark) Skjern Håndbold
- (Sweden) Martin Blomqvist (LB) to (Sweden) Vinslövs HK
