= H43 Lund =

Swedish handball club

- Full name: H43 Lunds handbollsklubb
- Short name: H43
- Founded: 1943; 83 years ago
- Dissolved: 2014; 12 years ago
- Arena: Bollhuset Lund, Lund
- Capacity: 150
- Club colours
Home	Away

H43 Lund (Lunds handbollsklubb av år 1943) is a handball team from Sweden. The club played in the Elitserien but after bankruptcy in 2014 they no longer exist. The youth club under the same name is a new club founded in 2015 under same short name, but the full name H43 Lund Handbollsförening.

The original club was founded in 1943 in a school class in Lund. Their teacher Y. Wallmer helped the boys found the club at a local café. 13 years later the club was playing in Sweden's highest division. H43 Lund played in "allsvenskan" for 14 years 1956-1970 before they were relegated to the second division. After nine years they were back in the top division but now only for seven years. In 1986 they were relegated again. In 2000 H43 Lund was back in "Elitserien" and stayed there for 12 years. During 2012/13 H43 played one year in division 2 but then came back. Economic bankruptcy in 2014 ended the history of the club. The club had to start in the bottom again, the Division 3. In 2022 the women's team was promoted to the 1. Division. In the 2023-24 season, the men's team won the 2. Division and was thus promoted to the Division 1.

Location of H43 Lund

== Sports Hall information ==
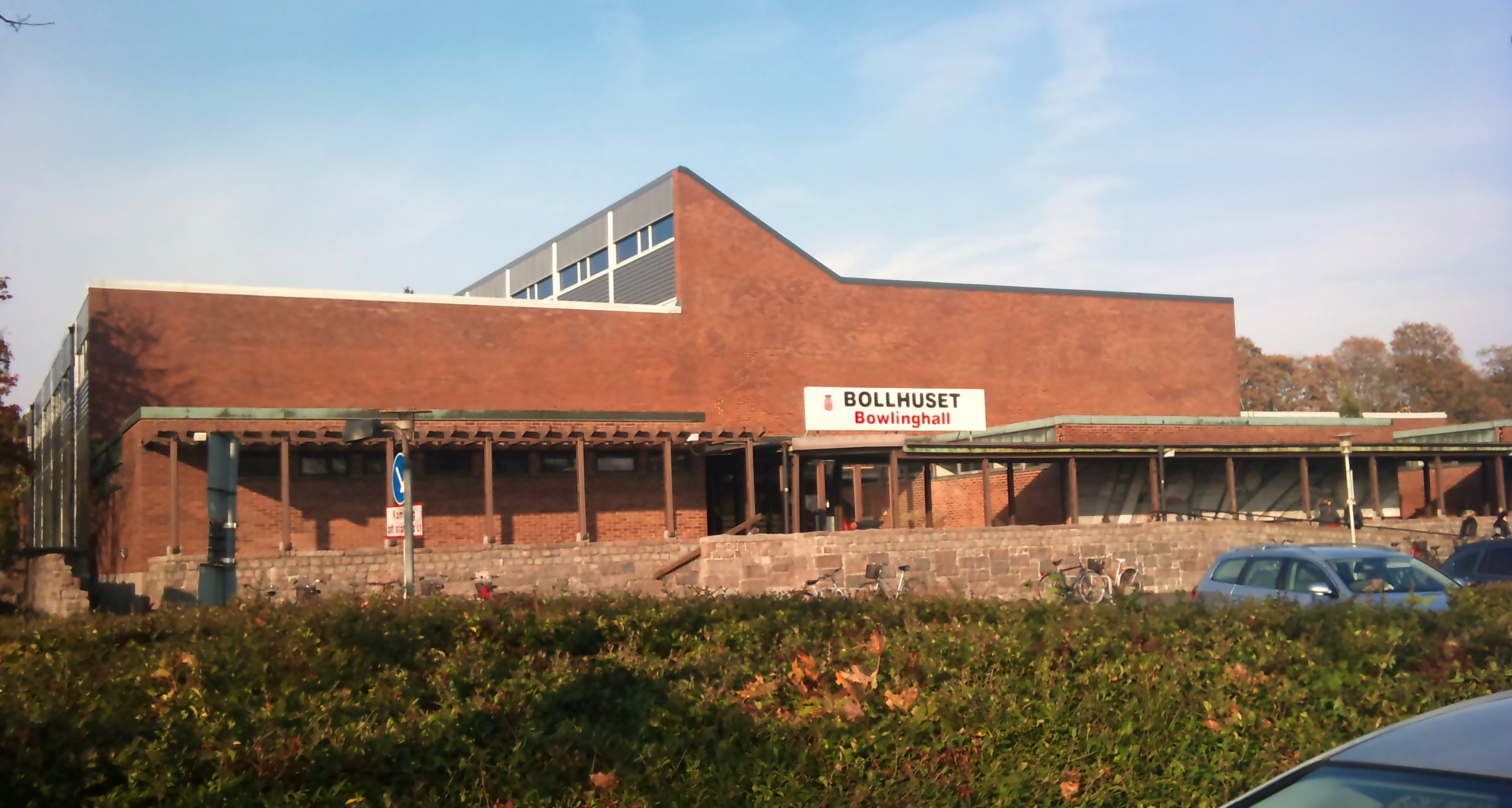
Home hall: Bollhuset Lund

- Name: – Bollhuset Lund
- City: – Lund
- Capacity: – 150
- Address: – Fasanvägen 2, 227 32 Lund, Sweden

=== Kits ===
HOME
2019–20	2020–

AWAY
2019–20	2020–

THIRD
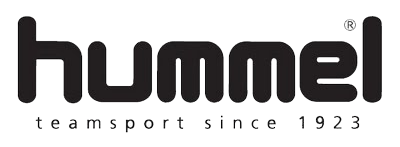
2019–20
