= Eskilstuna Guif =

Swedish handball club

- Full name: Eskilstuna Guif IF
- Founded: 1932; 94 years ago
- Arena: Stiga Sports Arena
- Capacity: 3700
- President: Rolf Brunnel
- Head coach: Zoran Roganović
- League: Allsvenskan (women's); Handbollligan (men's)
Home	Away

Eskilstuna Guif IF, commonly known as Eskilstuna Guif or Guif, is a handball club based in Eskilstuna, Sweden. It has reached the national championship finals on four occasions but never won and currently competes in Handbollsligan, the top domestic handball league.

== History ==
The club was founded on 26 May 1896 as Godtemplarnas Ungdoms- och Idrottsförening (lit. 'the Good Templars' Youth and Sports Club'). GUIF was one of the first sports clubs in Eskilstuna after Eskilstuna GAK.

Handball was introduced in 1932. They have reached the Swedish Championship final four times (1997, 2001, 2009 and 2011), but lost on each occasion. They also finished first in the regular season in 2011–12 and 2013–14, but were eliminated in the semi-finals in both these seasons. They have played 54 seasons in the top division, second only to Redbergslid, and are fourth in the all-time table of the league.

Eskilstuna Guif have also been active in athletics, bandy, cross-country skiing, football, gymnastics, ice hockey, and orienteering.

== Venue ==
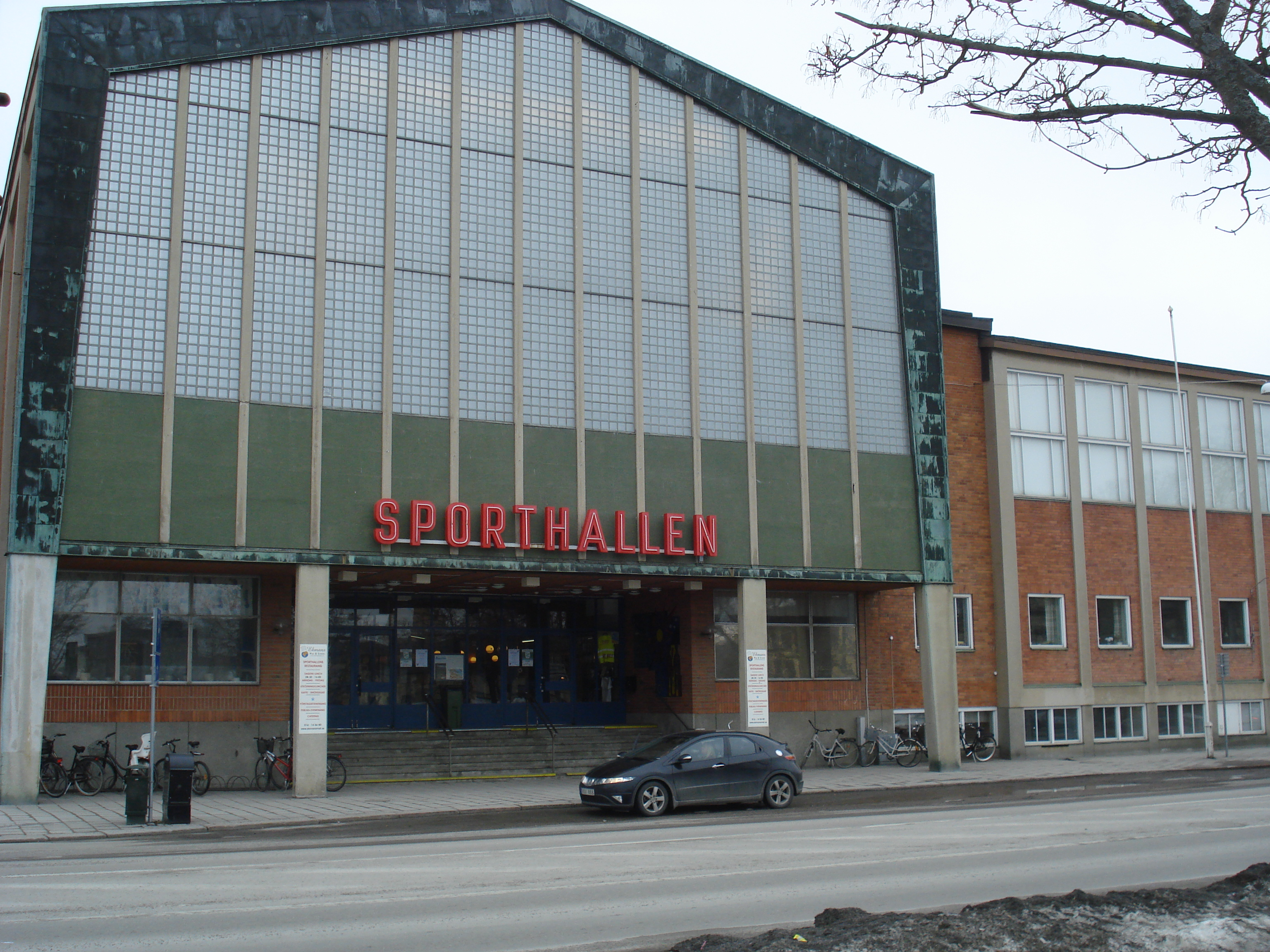
Sporthallen, home venue for Eskilstuna Guif until 2016

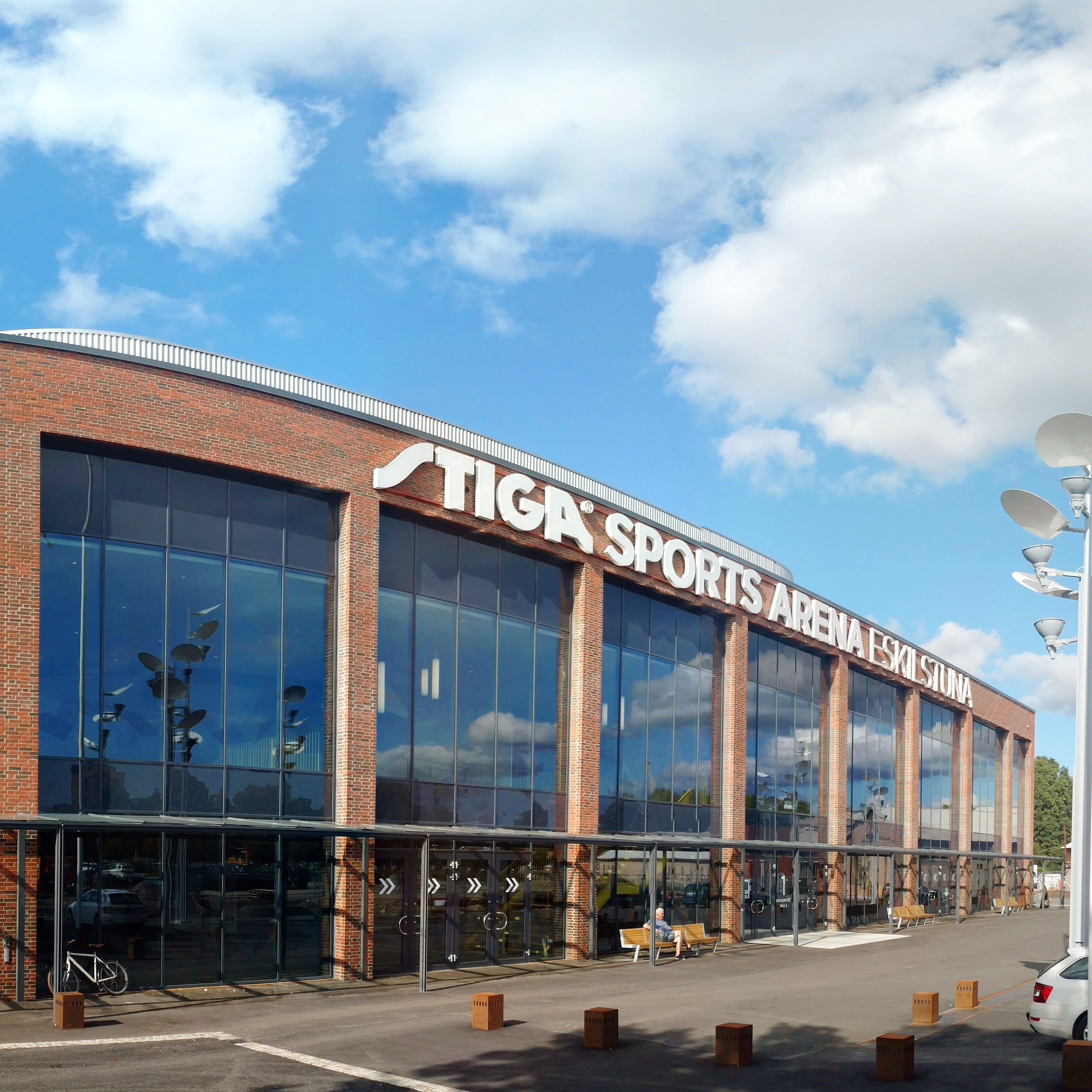
Stiga Sports Arena, home venue for Eskilstuna Guif since 2017

Eskilstuna Guif play their matches in 3700 capacity Stiga Sports Arena.

The team play edin Sporthallen in central Eskilstuna until the end of the 2015–16 season, when they left Sporthallen to play in Skjulstahallen outside Eskilstuna for one year. In September 2017, the team could move in to the new Stiga Sports Arena.

== Men's team ==
=== Kits ===
HOME
2016–17	2017–18	2018–19	2019–20	2020–

AWAY
2014–15	2016–17	2017–18	2018–19	2019–20	2020–

== Team ==
=== Current squad ===
Squad for the 2025–26 season

Goalkeepers

- (Norway) Nicolai Horntvedt Kristensen

Left Wingers
Right Wingers

- (Sweden) Andreas Flodman

Line players

Left Backs
Central Backs
Right Backs

=== Transfers ===
Transfers for the 2026–27 season

Joining

Leaving

- (Montenegro) Milorad Bakić (LB) to (Poland) Industria Kielce

=== Transfer History ===
Transfers for the 2025–26 season

Joining

- (Sweden) Andreas Flodman (RW) from (Germany) Frisch Auf Göppingen
- (Norway) Nicolai Horntvedt Kristensen (GK) from (Iceland) KA

Leaving

- (Sweden) Nikola Roganovic (LB) to (Sweden) HK Malmö
- (Sweden) Marko Roganovic (GK) to (Denmark) Bjerringbro-Silkeborg Håndbold
- (Sweden) Noel Gustafson (RW) to (Sweden) IFK Skövde

== Former club members ==
=== Notable former players ===
- (Iceland) Kristján Andrésson (1999–2004)
- (Sweden) Erik Hajas (1988–1990, 1992–2000)
- (Sweden) Claes Hellgren (1974–1978)
- (Sweden) Carl-Erik Stockenberg (1957–1967)
- (Sweden) Mattias Zachrisson (2006–2013)

== Former coaches ==
Seasons	Coach	Country
2007–2016	Kristján Andrésson	(Iceland)
2016–2019	Jan Ekman	(Finland) (Sweden)
2019–	Zoran Roganović	(Montenegro)
