= Lugi HF =

Swedish handball club

- Full name: Lugi Handbollsförening
- Founded: 1941; 85 years ago
- Arena: Sparbanken Skåne Arena
- Capacity: 3,500
- Head coach: Timo Glave (women's); Nemanja Milošević (men's)
- League: Handbollsligan (women's); Handbollsligan (men's)
- 2024-25: 12th, relegated (women's); 12th, relegated (men's)
- Club colours
Home	Away

Lugi Handbollsförening, normally called Lugi HF, is a professional handball team from Lund, Sweden. Both the men's and women's teams play in the Allsvenskan, the second tier in 2025–26, after suffering relegation.

Location of Lugi HF

== Sports Hall information ==
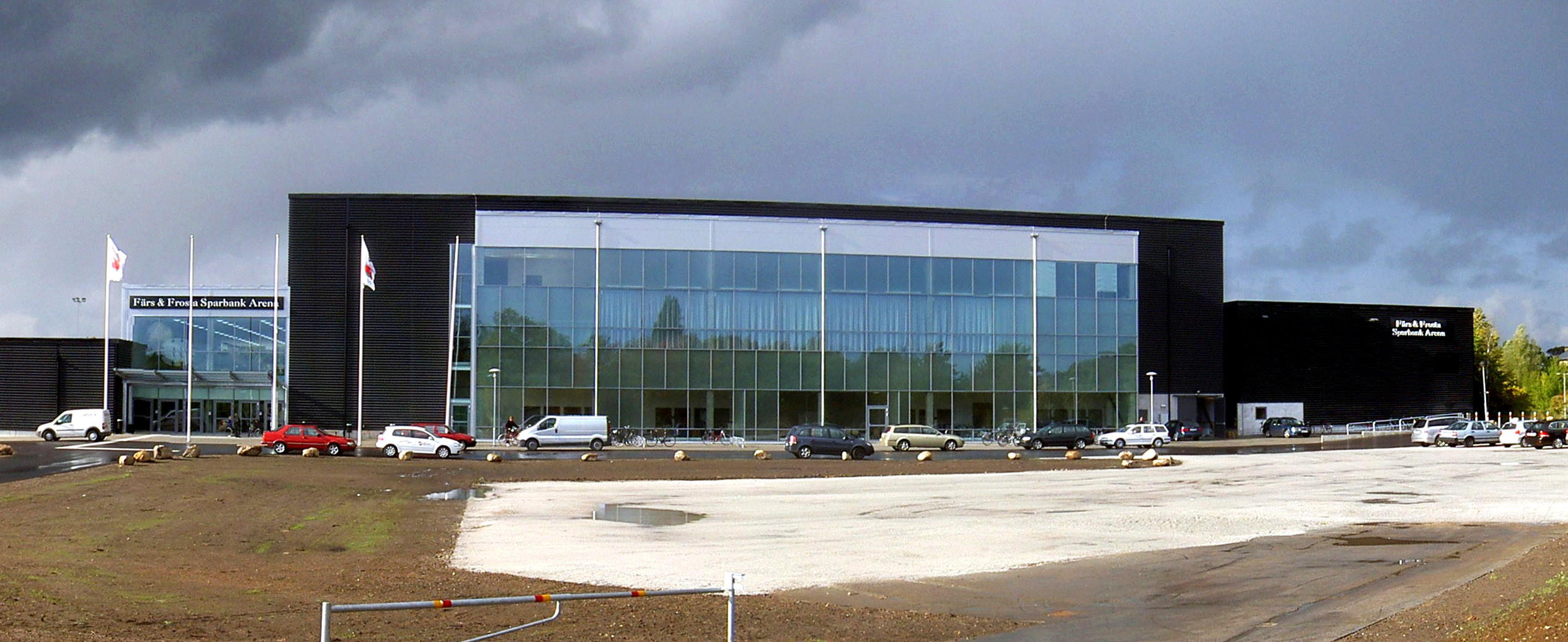
Home hall: Sparbanken Skåne Arena

- Name: – Sparbanken Skåne Arena
- City: – Lund
- Capacity: – 3000
- Address: – Arenatorget 2–6, 222 28 Lund

== Men's team ==
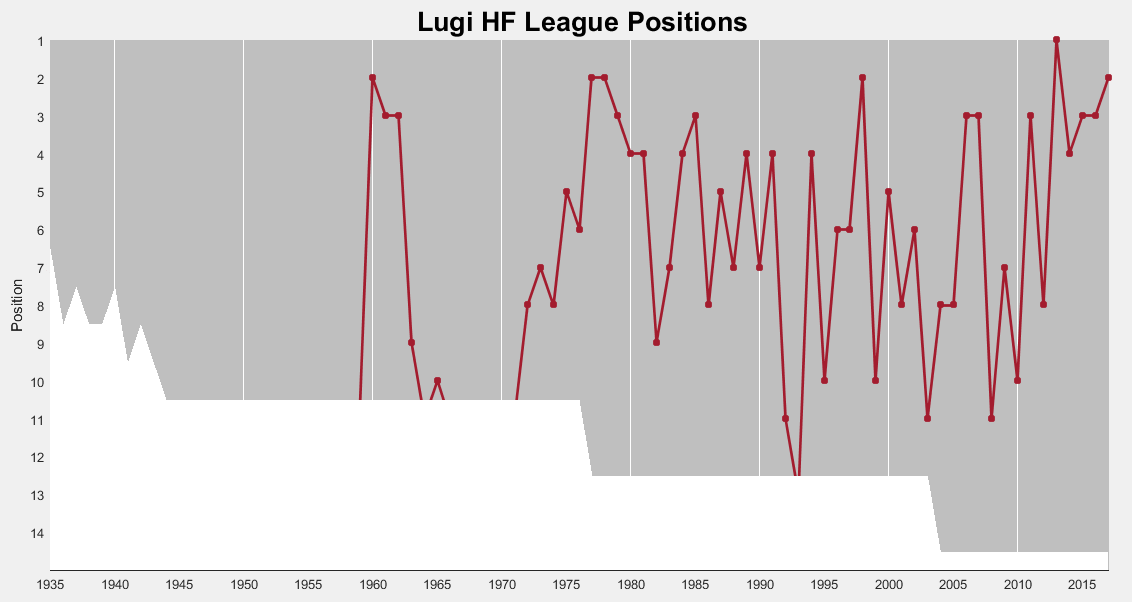
Lugi's (men) positions in the top division

Lugi's men's team were promoted to the top division, at the time known as Allsvenskan, in 1959. In their debut season in the top-flight, Lugi finished second in the league behind IK Heim, making them Swedish Championship (SM) silver medalists. They finished third in both 1960–61 and 1961–62, before being relegated in 1962–63. They were promoted back in 1964, but were relegated after one season. Lugi were promoted to Allsvenskan again in 1971 and have since played every season in the top level except 1992–93. By this time a playoffs had been introduced to determine the champions. In 1978, Lugi reached the finals but were defeated by HK Drott. Two years later, they won their only SM gold so far, winning the final series against Ystads IF. In the following season, they reached the semifinals of the European Cup, where they lost against East German club SC Magdeburg. Lugi qualified for the SM finals again in 1984, but were defeated by HK Drott. In 1984–85, they reached to the semifinals of the Cup Winners' Cup, where they were eliminated by Soviet club CSKA Moskva. A year later they reached the semifinals in the IHF Cup. They lost against Spanish club CB Tecnisa. In 1996, Lugi lost the SM finals against Redbergslids IK. In 2012–13, Lugi won the regular season, but were eliminated by HK Drott in the semifinals. A year later, they reached the final, only to lose against Alingsås HK.

In the 2024-25 season the team was relegated after finishing last in the league.

== Kits and Players ==
HOME
2011-12	2012-13	2013-14	2014-15	2015-16	2016-18	2020-

AWAY
2011-12	2017-18	2018-19

=== Current squad ===
Squad for the 2022-23 season

Goalkeepers

- 12 (Sweden) Victor Hedberg
- 16 (Sweden) Kasper Hall

Wingers
LW

- 22 (Sweden) Axel Andersson
- 33 (Sweden) Oliver Olsson

RW

- 6 (Sweden) Christopher Schnell
- 17 (Sweden) Adam Wennerholm
- 27 (Sweden) Måns Simonsson

Line Players

- 2 (Sweden) Albin Carlsson
- 4 (Sweden) Jacob Söderberg
- 8 (Denmark) Mads Kragh Thomsen

Back Players
LB

- 13 (Sweden) Adrian Hesslekrans
- 15 (Sweden) Axel Janhall
- 24 (Sweden) Fredrik Olsson
- 26 (Sweden) Rasmus Nilsson
- 28 (Norway) Jonas Elverhøy

CB

- 7 (Sweden) Axel Månsson
- 14 (Sweden) Casper Käll

RB

- 20 (Sweden) Assar Kammenhed
- 21 (Sweden) Theo Übelacker

=== Transfers ===
Transfers for the 2026–27 season

Joining

- (Sweden) Adam Lönn (LB) from (Germany) SC DHfK Leipzig
- (Sweden) Hampus Olsson (RW) from (Germany) HC Erlangen

Leaving

=== Transfer History ===
Transfers for the 2025–26 season

Joining

- (Sweden) Albert Månsson (CB) from (Sweden) Alingsås HK
- (Sweden) Jakob Markoff (CB) from (Sweden) Alingsås HK
- (Sweden) Viggo Håkansson (GK) from (Sweden) Ystads IF

Leaving

- (Faroe Islands) Aleksandar Lacok (GK) to (Switzerland) TSV St. Otmar St. Gallen
- (Sweden) Oskar Arnell (GK) to (Sweden) Ystads IF

== Women's team ==
The women's team advanced to national league in 2006 and have been playing there since. Two years 2012 and 2013 they have reached the final in championship but both times they lost to IK Sävehof in the final. 2011 Lugi played in Cupwinners Cup and reached semifinal.

In the 2024-25 season the team was relegated after finishing last in the league.

== Kits and players ==
HOME
2012-13	2013-14	2015-16	2017-18

AWAY
2015-16	2016-17	2017-19	2020-

=== European record ===
Season	Competition	Round	Club	1st leg	2nd leg	Aggregate
2016–17	EHF Cup	R1	(Denmark) Nykøbing Falster HK	23–25	20–29	43–54

=== Current squad ===
Squad for the 2022-23 season

Goalkeepers

- 1 (Norway) Victoria Solli Berg
- 12 (Sweden) Hanna Popaja
- 16 (Sweden) Tuva Dahlqvist

Wingers
LW

- 22 (Sweden) Lova Nyrell
- 23 (Sweden) Amanda Andersson
- 24 (Sweden) Alva Hopstadius
- 30 (Sweden) Clara Lerby

RW

- (Denmark) Tania Knudsen
- 4 (Sweden) Filippa Hall
- 5 (Sweden) Emma Ekenman-Fernis
- 27 (Sweden) Wilma Svensson

Line Players

- 6 (Sweden) Filippa Nyman
- 10 (Sweden) Malva Carlsson
- 11 (Sweden) Ofelia Shoai Hallberg
- 28 (Sweden) Perla Rainey-Malmberg

Back Players
LB

- 2 (Denmark) Cecilie Bjerre
- 3 (Sweden) Sabina Jacobsen
- 8 (Sweden) Cornelia Dahlström
- 18 (Sweden) Elise Lönnegren
- 25 (Sweden) Lovisa Liljenberg

CB

- (Iceland) Asdis Augustdottir
- 9 (Sweden) Agnes Lundin
- 20 (Sweden) Isabelle Gulldén
- 21 (Sweden) Nora Möller Adébo

RB

- 7 (Sweden) Kajsa Lindeberg
- 19 (Sweden) Amanda Iséni
- (Sweden) Sofia Delac

=== Transfers ===
Transfers for the 2023-24 season

Joining

Leaving
