= Redbergslids IK =

Swedish handball club

- Full name: Redbergslids Idrottsklubb
- Nickname(s): De vita eleganterna (The White Elegants)
- Short name: RIK
- Founded: 6 December 1916; 109 years ago
- Arena: Prioritet Serneke Arena, Gothenburg
- Capacity: 550
- League: Handbollsligan
Home	Away

Redbergslids IK (RIK), is a professional handball team from Gothenburg, Sweden founded in 1916. Redbergslid is the most successful club in Sweden, having won 20 Swedish Championship titles. Home games are played in Prioritet Serneke Arena.

Redbergslid is the only Scandinavian club to win the EHF Champions League (1959). They also reached the final of the EHF Cup Winner's Cup in 2003.

Noted players of the club include Peter Gentzel, Stefan Lövgren, Ljubomir Vranjes, Magnus Wislander and Andreas Palicka.

In the 2022/2023 season Redbergslid were relegated from the top Swedish league, after spending 40 years straight (82 in total) in the top league. After being relegated from the second Swedisk league in 2023/2024, they went undefeated through the third division (Division 1 södra) 2024/2025 and will be playing in the second Swedish league 2025/2026.

Redbergslids women's team won the fourth league (Dam 2 Väst) undefeated in 2023/2024 and came fourth in the third division (Division 1 södra) 2024/2025. After winning two qualification rounds they will be playing in the second Swedish league 2025/2026.

Location of Redbergslids IK

== Sports Hall information ==
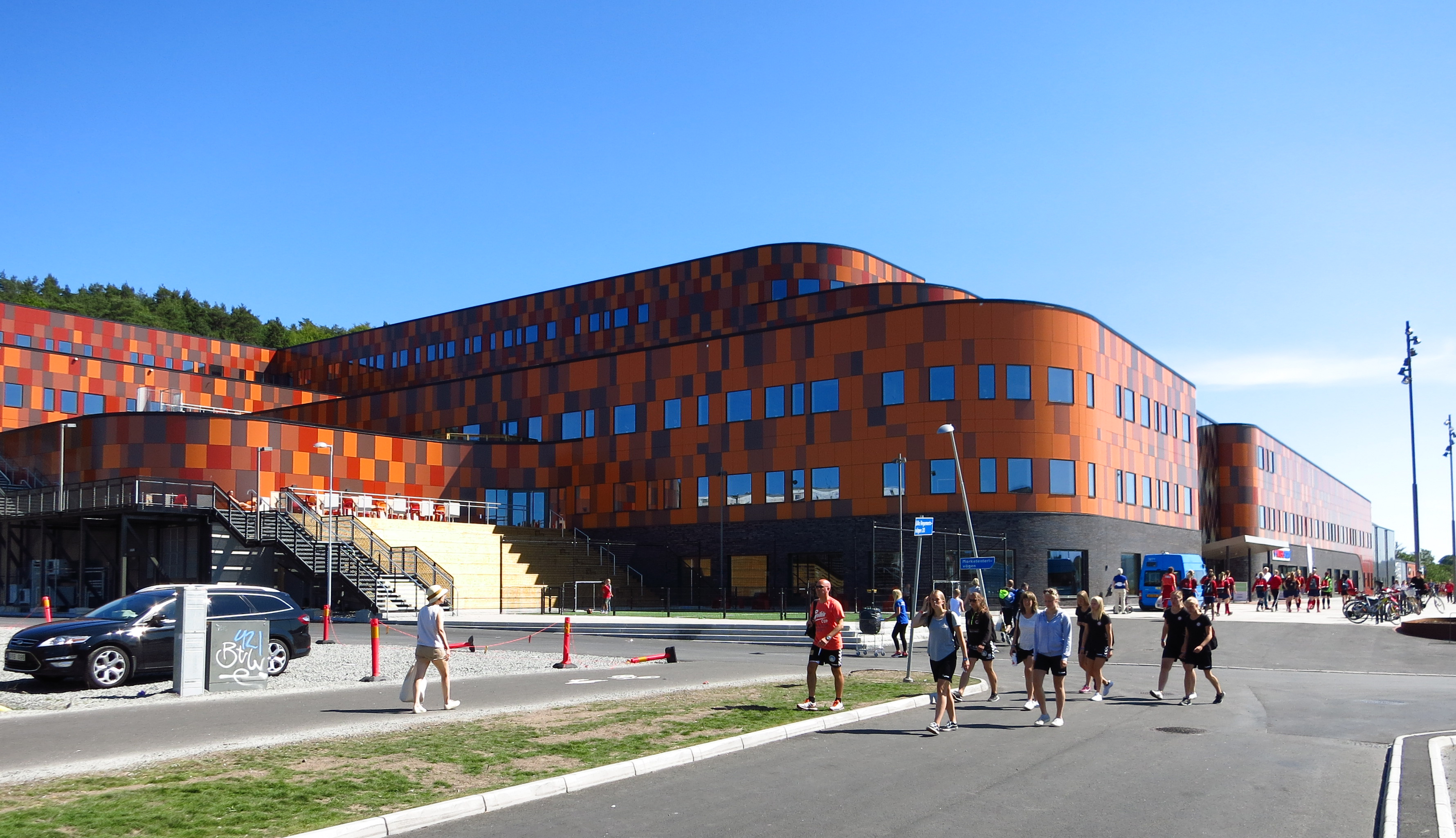
Home hall: Prioritet Serneke Arena

- Name: – Prioritet Serneke Arena
- City: – Gothenburg
- Capacity: – 550
- Address: – Krutvägen 2–4, 415 28 Gothenburg, Sweden

== Kits ==
HOME
2014–15	2015–19	2019–

AWAY
2015–19	2019–

THIRD
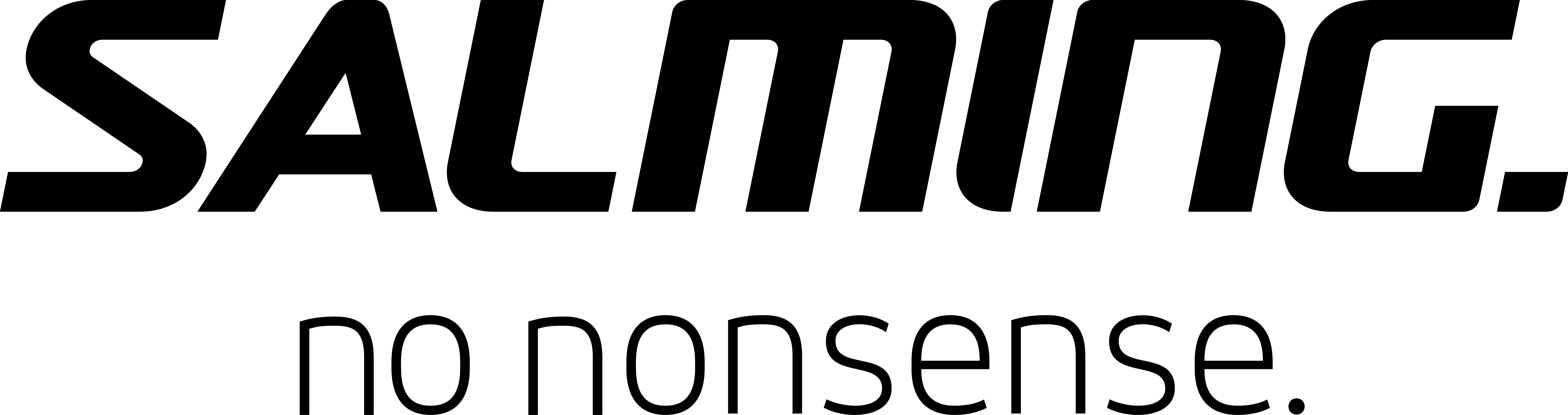
2015–19

== Accomplishments ==
- Handbollsligan: 20
  - Gold: 1933, 1934, 1947, 1954, 1958, 1963, 1964, 1965, 1985, 1986, 1987, 1989, 1993, 1995, 1996, 1997, 1998, 2000, 2001, 2003
- EHF Champions League: 1
  - Gold: 1959
- EHF Cup Winners' Cup:
  - Silver: 2003
