= Handbollsligan =

Highest league in Swedish handball

- Current season, competition or edition: 2025–26 Handbollsligan
- Sport: Handball
- Founded: 1931; 95 years ago
- No. of teams: 14
- Country: Sweden
- Confederation: EHF
- Most recent champion: IFK Kristianstad (10th title) (2025–26)
- Most titles: Redbergslids IK (20 titles)
- Relegation to: Allsvenskan
- Domestic cup: Swedish Cup
- International cups: EHF European League; EHF European Cup
- Website: handbollsligan.se

Handbollsligan (literally, "The Handball league") is the highest league in the league system of Swedish handball, and comprises the top 14 Swedish handball teams. The first season began in 1931–32. The season ends with a playoff.

== Structure ==
The season starts in September with a regular season comprising 14 teams meeting each other twice. A total of 26 rounds. The eight best teams after the regular season qualifies for the play-off. The 14th team is relegated, and the 11th, 12th and 13th team plays matches against the second, third and fourth from Allsvenskan to qualify for next season's Handbollsligan.

The season ends with the finals in the beginning of May and the winning team qualifies directly to EHF European League and the losing team qualifies for the EHF European Cup.

== Teams for season 2025–26 ==
Location of teams in 2025/2026 Handbollsligan

Team	Location	Stadium	Stadium capacity
Alingsås HK	Alingsås	Estrad Alingsås	2,800
Amo HK	Alstermo	Amokabelhallen	700
Eskilstuna Guif	Eskilstuna	STIGA Sports Arena	4,000
Hammarby IF	Stockholm	Eriksdalshallen	2,600
HF Karlskrona	Karlskrona	Brinova Arena Karlskrona	2,500
HK Malmö	Malmö	Baltiska Hallen	4,000
IF Hallby	Jönköping	Jönköpings idrottshus	1,500
IFK Kristianstad	Kristianstad	Kristianstad Arena	5,221
IFK Skövde	Skövde	Arena Skövde	2,516
IK Sävehof	Partille	Partille Arena	4,100
OV Helsingborg	Helsingborg	Helsingborg Arena	4,700
VästeråsIrsta HF	Västerås	Västerås Arena	1,800
Ystads IF HF	Ystad	Ystad Arena	2,863
Önnereds HK	Gothenburg	ÖHK-hallen	1,004

== Swedish Champions ==
- 1931–32 – Flottans IF Karlskrona
- 1932–33 – Redbergslids IK
- 1933–34 – Redbergslids IK
- 1934–35 – Majornas IK
- 1935–36 – SoIK Hellas
- 1936–37 – SoIK Hellas
- 1937–38 – Västerås IK
- 1938–39 – Uppsala Studenters IF
- 1939–40 – Majornas IK
- 1940–41 – IFK Kristianstad
- 1941–42 – Majornas IK
- 1942–43 – Majornas IK
- 1943–44 – Majornas IK
- 1944–45 – Majornas IK
- 1945–46 – Majornas IK
- 1946–47 – Redbergslids IK
- 1947–48 – IFK Kristianstad
- 1948–49 – IFK Lidingö
- 1949–50 – IK Heim
- 1950–51 – AIK Handboll
- 1951–52 – IFK Kristianstad
- 1952–53 – IFK Kristianstad
- 1953–54 – Redbergslids IK
- 1954–55 – IK Heim
- 1955–56 – Örebro SK
- 1956–57 – Örebro SK
- 1957–58 – Redbergslids IK
- 1958–59 – IK Heim
- 1989-60 – IK Heim
- 1960–61 – Vikingarnas IF
- 1961–62 – IK Heim
- 1962–63 – Redbergslids IK
- 1963–64 – Redbergslids IK
- 1964–65 – Redbergslids IK
- 1965–66 – IS Göta
- 1966–67 – Vikingarnas IF
- 1967–68 – IF Saab
- 1968–69 – SoIK Hellas
- 1969–70 – SoIK Hellas
- 1970–71 – SoIK Hellas
- 1971–72 – SoIK Hellas
- 1972–73 – IF Saab
- 1973–74 – IF Saab
- 1974–75 – HK Drott
- 1975–76 – Ystads IF
- 1976–77 – SoIK Hellas
- 1977–78 – HK Drott
- 1978–79 – HK Drott
- 1979–80 – LUGI HF
- 1980–81 – Vikingarnas IF
- 1981–82 – IK Heim
- 1982–83 – IK Heim
- 1983–84 – HK Drott
- 1984–85 – Redbergslids IK
- 1985–86 – Redbergslids IK
- 1986–87 – Redbergslids IK
- 1987–88 – HK Drott
- 1988–89 – Redbergslids IK
- 1989–90 – HK Drott
- 1990–91 – HK Drott
- 1991–92 – Ystads IF
- 1992–93 – Redbergslids IK
- 1993–94 – HK Drott
- 1994–95 – Redbergslids IK
- 1995–96 – Redbergslids IK
- 1996–97 – Redbergslids IK
- 1997–98 – Redbergslids IK
- 1998–99 – HK Drott
- 1999-00 – Redbergslids IK
- 2000–01 – Redbergslids IK
- 2001–02 – HK Drott
- 2002–03 – Redbergslids IK
- 2003–04 – IK Sävehof
- 2004–05 – IK Sävehof
- 2005–06 – Hammarby IF
- 2006–07 – Hammarby IF
- 2007–08 – Hammarby IF
- 2008–09 – Alingsås HK
- 2009–10 – IK Sävehof
- 2010–11 – IK Sävehof
- 2011–12 – IK Sävehof
- 2012–13 – HK Drott
- 2013–14 – Alingsås HK
- 2014–15 – IFK Kristianstad
- 2015–16 – IFK Kristianstad
- 2016–17 – IFK Kristianstad
- 2017–18 – IFK Kristianstad
- 2018–19 – IK Sävehof
- 2019–20 – Cancelled (COVID-19)
- 2020–21 – IK Sävehof
- 2021–22 – Ystads IF
- 2022–23 – IFK Kristianstad
- 2023–24 – IK Sävehof
- 2024–25 – Ystads IF
- 2025–26 – IFK Kristianstad

== EHF coefficient ranking ==
- For season 2015/2016, see footnote
- 7. (11) (Poland) PGNiG Superliga Mężczyzn (38.60)
- 8. (10) (North Macedonia) Macedonian Super Liga (36.40)
- 9. (14) (Sweden) Elitserien (36.33)
- 10. (12) (Belarus) Belarusian First League (33.90)
- 11. (8) (Switzerland) Swiss Handball League (33.00)

Seasonal Coefficient Ranking Graph :

Year	2010-11	2011-12	2012-13	2013-14	2014-15	2015-16	2016-17
Rank	15	▲13	13	▲12	▼14	▲9	▼10
