= Djurgårdens IF =

Sports club in Stockholm, Sweden

Djurgårdens Idrottsförening
- Founded: 12 March 1891
- Based in: Stockholm, Sweden
- Stadium: 3Arena (men's football); Stockholm Olympic Stadium (women's football); Hovet (ice hockey); Östermalms IP (bandy)
- Colours: yellow, red, blue
- Chairman: Andreas von der Heide
- Official fan club: Järnkaminerna
- Website: www.dif1891.se

Djurgårdens Idrottsförening, commonly known simply as Djurgårdens IF, Djurgården (IPA: [ˈjʉ̂ːrˌɡoːɖɛn]), and (especially locally) Djurgår'n (IPA: [ˈjʉ̌ː(r)ɡɔɳ]), Dif or DIF (Note: In the media, "Djurgårdens IF" is normally abbreviated "Dif", in accordance with Swedish writing standards that state that acronyms that are pronounced as a word, as opposed to letter by letter, should be spelled with the first letter in upper case and the remaining in lower case, thus "Dif". However, some supporters of the club, as well as the club itself, prefer to use only uppercase, "DIF", even though they also pronounce it as a word: [diːf].) – is a Swedish sports association with several sections, located in Stockholm. Djurgårdens IF is an alliance club since 1991 and, as of 2025, it consists of 22 individual sports clubs.

== History ==
=== Founding (1891–1896) ===
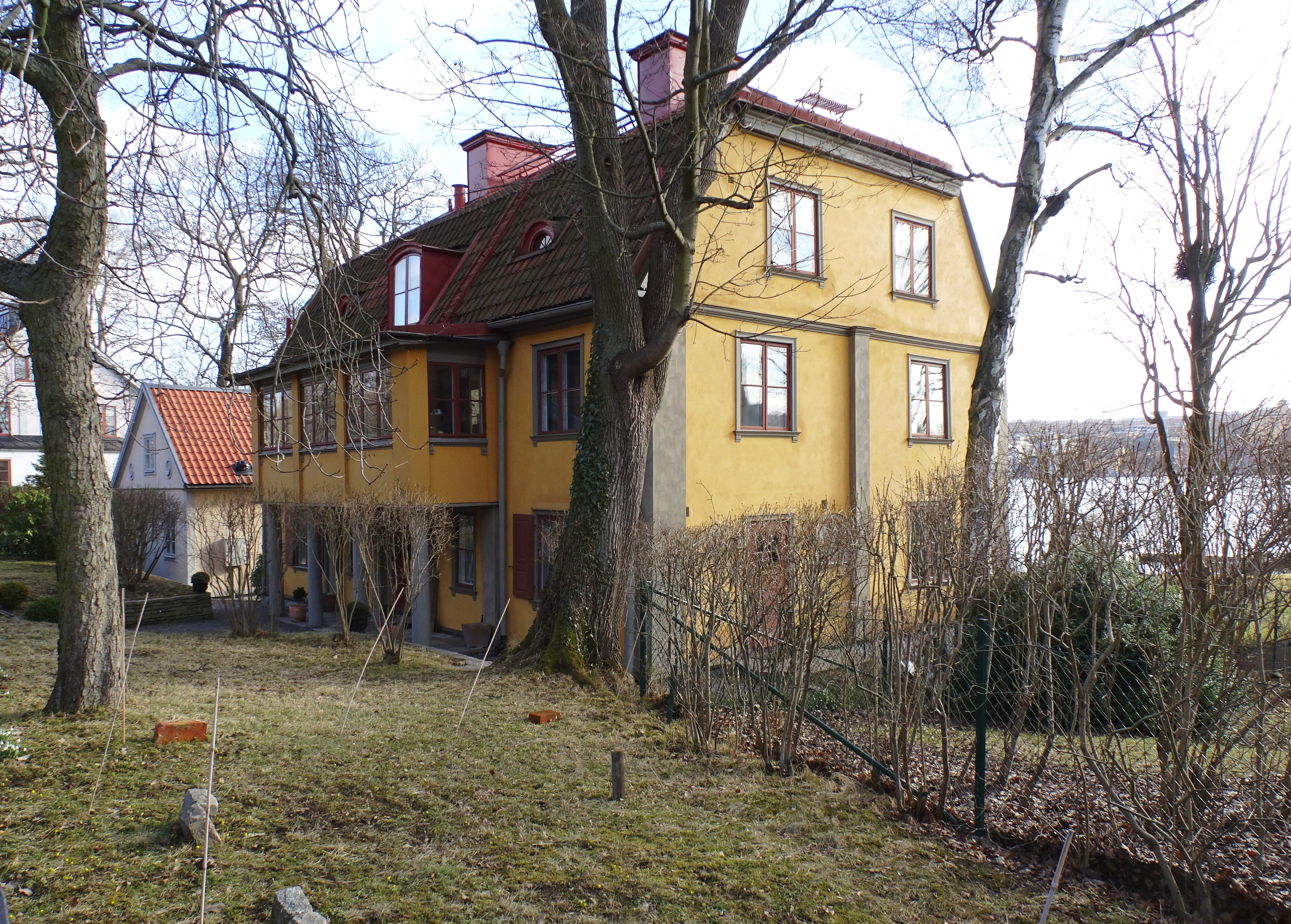
Alberget 4a, where Djurgårdens IF was founded on 12 March 1891

The club was founded in 1891 by a group of young athletes living in the borough and port district Djurgårdsstaden on Djurgården in central Stockholm. Inspired by the Norwegian His Majesty the King's Guard and their ski jumping exhibitions in Stockholm, the adolescents of the area contested diverse sports against each other both summertime and wintertime. On 12 March 1891, John G. Jansson, then 22 years old, and a dozen others founded Djurgårdens IF near Franska värdshuset. The exact address was a café on Alberget 4a. Jansson became the first chairman. Most of the founders were from the working class, and Djurgården maintained that profile for most of its early history, in sharp contrast with middle class rivals AIK. From the beginning, to be considered a member, one had to live on the island of Djurgården, but this was soon erased from the statues of the club.

With an original focus on winter sports and athletics, the club quickly branched into other sports, becoming one of Sweden's most successful sports clubs of the 20th and 21st century.

=== Initial achievements (1897–1923) ===
In 1897, Gustaf Söderström became Djurgårdens IF's first Swedish champion when he won the shot put (both hands), event at the Swedish Athletics Championships. He repeated the achievement the following year, and also won the discus throw event. Söderström also competed in the 1900 Summer Olympics and won the tug of war event. Club mate Karl Gustaf Staaf was also in the Denmark–Sweden mixed team that won.

The football department was formed in 1899 with the help of former GAIS player Theodor Andersson. The team played its first match in July 1899, a 1–2 loss against AIK. Soon started a strong and close competition with neighbouring club AIK, which both had been founded within a month in 1891. The two rivals play the Tvillingderbyt.

In 1900, Ernst Ekberg became the clubs first Swedish champion in racewalking, winning the 5000 metres event. In 1904, Djurgården won its first Swedish championship in speed skating when Birger Carlsson won the allround event. Swimming had become a sport for the programme of the club, but in 1906 the swimmers left the club and instead started SK Neptun.

In 1908, the bandy team won its first national title. The team consisted of Erik Andéhn, Gunnar Friberg, Ivar Friberg, Götrik Frykman, Gottfrid Johansson, Erik Lavass, Bror Modén, Algot Nilsson, Karl Öhman, Arvid Spångberg, and Birger Walla. Women were allowed into the club in 1908. In 1909, Tage Carlsson won the clubs first national championship title in cycling, when he won the 5 km track event.

In 1910, N. A. Hedjerson won the first Swedish championship title in cross-country skiing, the 30 km event. The same year, Einar Olsson also won the club's first Swedish championship in Nordic combined and ski jumping. Einar Olsson, who had joined Djurgårdens IF in 1905, would become national champion in ski jumping, Nordic combined, ski orienteering and football. In 1911, Hedjerson, Albin Sandström, and Alfred Sandström won the club's first Swedish championship in ski orienteering by winning the relay event.

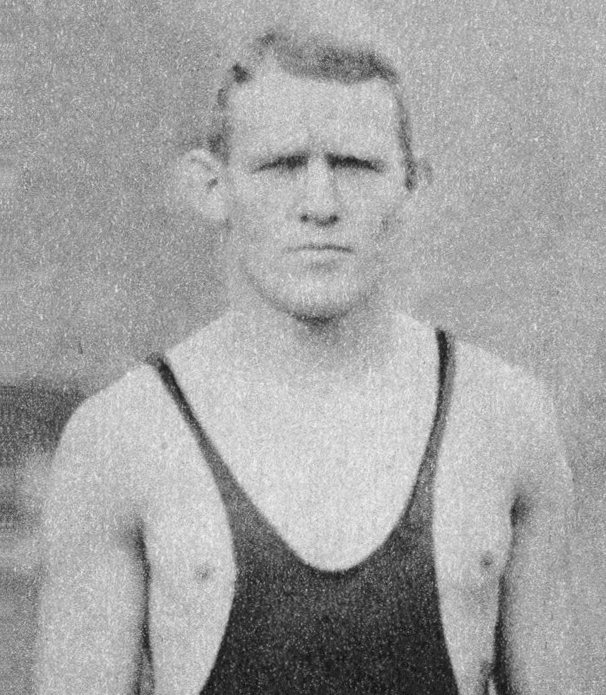
Djurgården wrestler and Olympic silver medalist Gottfrid Svensson

In 1911, Gottfrid Svensson became Djurgården's first Swedish champion in wrestling, when he won the Greco-Roman lightweight event, which he also repeated in 1912 and 1913. Also in 1911, Bertil Gustavsson became Djurgårdens IF's first champion in weightlifting when he won the one-hand snatch event.

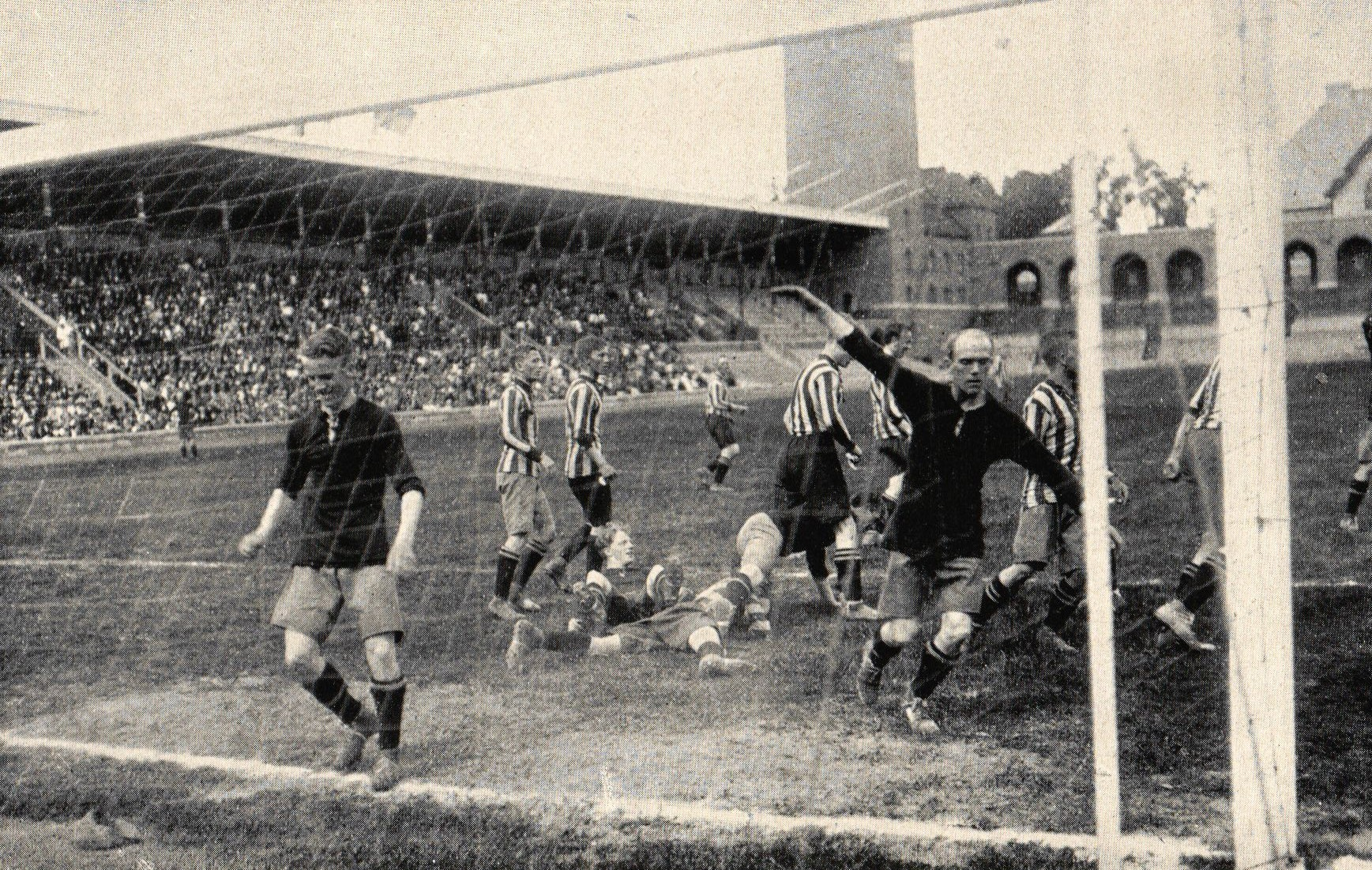
The men's football team against Örgryte IS at Stockholm Olympic Stadium in 1917

From 1911, Djurgårdens IF rented the ground Tranebergs IP. In 1912, the bandy team won its second national title. At the 1912 Summer Olympics, Djurgården athlete Erik Almlöf represented Sweden and won a bronze medal in the men's triple jump event. The same year the men's football team won its first national championship title, winning the 1912 Svenska Mästerskapet final with a team consisting of Gösta Backlund, Gösta Dahlberg, Götrik Frykman, Victor Jansson, Valdemar Johannison, Gösta Karlsson, Bertil Nordenskjöld, Nils Öhman, Einar Olsson, Jean Söderberg, and Ragnar Wicksell. The team then repeated the achievement three times the following years – in the 1915 final, 1917 final and 1920 final.

From 1913 to 1919, Djurgården ski jumpers won seven consecutive national championships in ski jumping with Nils Lindh claiming three, Einar Olsson three and Menotti Jakobsson one. In 1913, Einar Olsson won the ski jumping event at the 1913 Nordic Games. The club won its first Swedish championship title in boxing in 1920 when David Lindén won the men's light heavyweight title. At the 1920 Summer Olympics, Djurgården wrestler Gottfrid Svensson represented Sweden and won a silver medal in the men's freestyle lightweight event. At the same Olympics, Djurgården wrestler Fritiof Svensson won a bronze medal in the men's Greco-Roman featherweight event. In 1922, Svensson became wrestling world champion at the 1922 World Wrestling Championships, held at Cirkus in Stockholm. In 1922, the ice hockey team entered the 1922 Swedish Ice Hockey Championship but lost in the semi-finals against Hammarby IF, and in the following season, the team first participated in the 1923 Klass I.

=== 1924–1939 ===
In 1924, Djurgården won its first Swedish championship title in a women's event when Karin Bollner, Sigrid Sandström, and Ester Hedjerson won the women's 10 km team event at the Swedish Cross-Country Skiing Championships. At the 1924 Summer Olympics, Djurgården footballer Harry Sundberg was part of Sweden's bronze medal winning team in the football tournament.

In 1926, the ice hockey team won its first Swedish championship. In the final, they beat Västerås IK, 7–1. The title winning team consisted of Ruben Allinger, Folke Andersson, Sune Andersson, Wilhelm Arwe, Nils Johansson, Ernst Karlberg, Erik Lindgren, and Walter Söderman. The men's football team made its debut in Allsvenskan in the 1927–28 season, but the stay only lasted one season. At the 1928 Winter Olympics, two Djurgården ice hockey players – Nils Johansson and Ernst Karlberg – was part of Sweden's bronze medal winning team in the men's tournament. Also in 1928, Bertil Nordenskjöld became the chairman of Djurgården. He was a former football defender of the club and four-time Swedish champion.

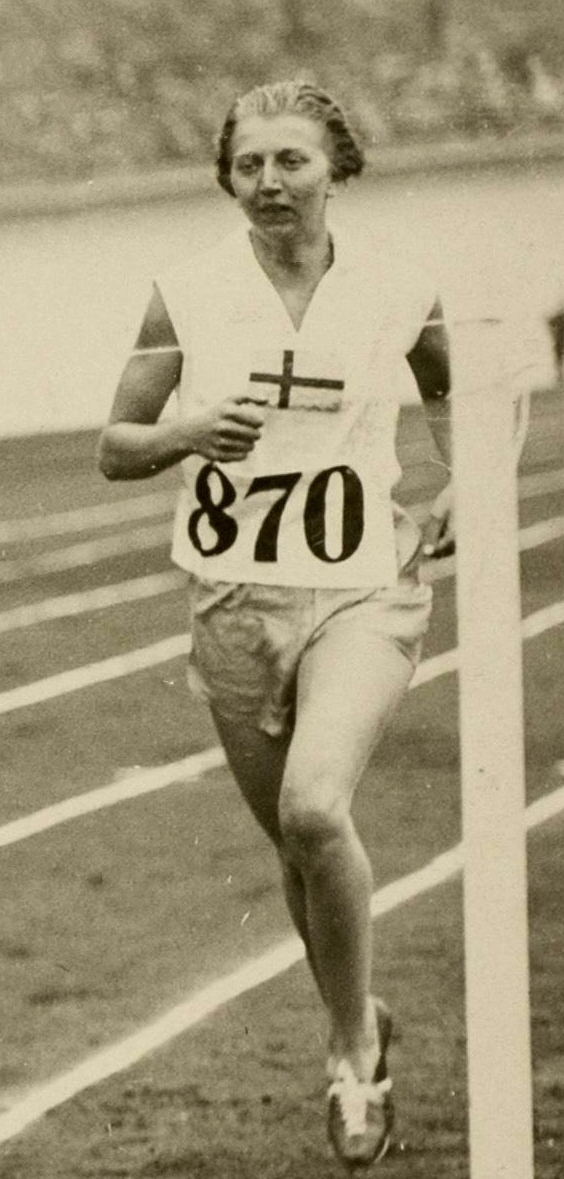
Inga Gentzel, Djurgården athlete and Olympic bronze medalist in the 800 metres event.

At the 1928 Swedish Women's Athletics Championships, Djurgårdens IF won their first four Swedish championship titles in women's athletics events – Ebba Myrberg won the 100 metres event and the long jump, Inga Gentzel the 800 metres event and a team consisting of the Margareta Hagelberg, Myrberg, Emy Pettersson, and Anna Sundblad won the 4 × 100 metres relay event. The championship, held at Strömvallen in Gävle was the first championship where women competed. Later in the year Djurgården's Gentzel represented Sweden at the 1928 Summer Olympics and won a bronze medal in the 800 metres event. Gentzel then also won the 800 metres event at the 1929, 1930, and 1931 Swedish Athletics Championships.

At the 1928 Summer Olympics, Djurgården boxer Nils Ramm represented Sweden and won a silver medal in the men's heavyweight event. In the 1931 season, the bandy team competed in the first national bandy league, the Division 1. At the 1932 Summer Olympics, Djurgården wrestler Einar Karlsson represented Sweden and won a bronze medal in the men's freestyle featherweight event. In 1933, Östen Eriksson became the club's first national champion in bowling when he won the men's individual event.

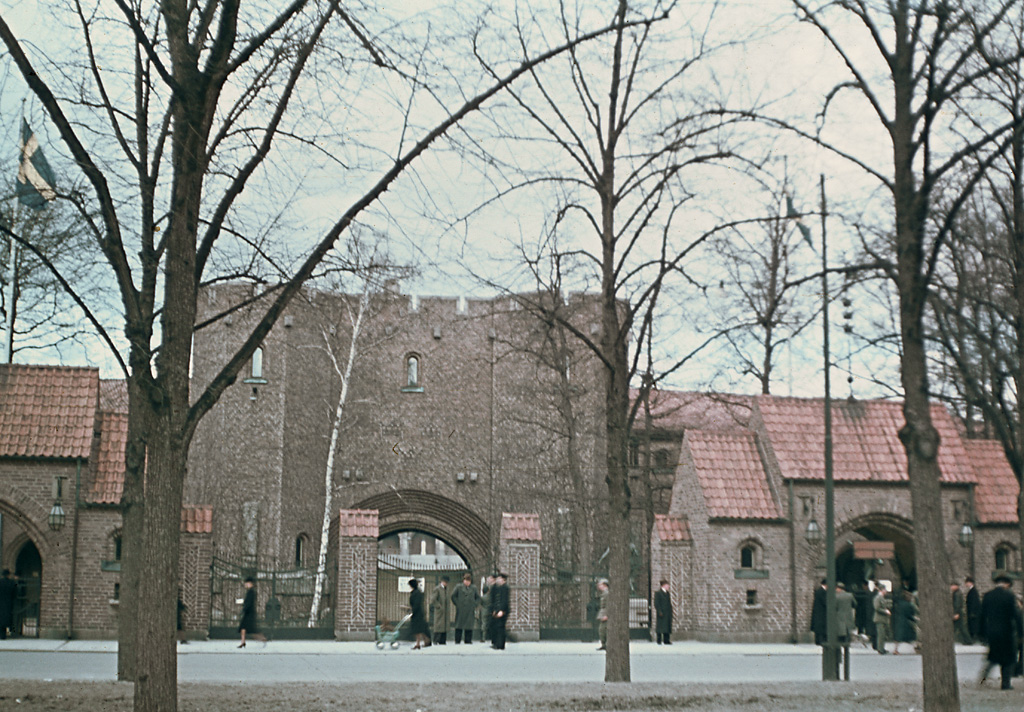
From 1936, Stockholm Olympic Stadium was the home ground of the Djurgården men's football team until 3Arena was inaugurated in 2013. It is the home ground for the Djurgården women's football team.

In ice hockey, Djurgården discontinued the department after the 1933–34 Elitserien season due to high costs. In 1935, Djurgårdens IF had to leave Tranebergs IP that was going to be used for housing projects. Starting in 1936, the club instead had the Stockholm Olympic Stadium as its home for football.

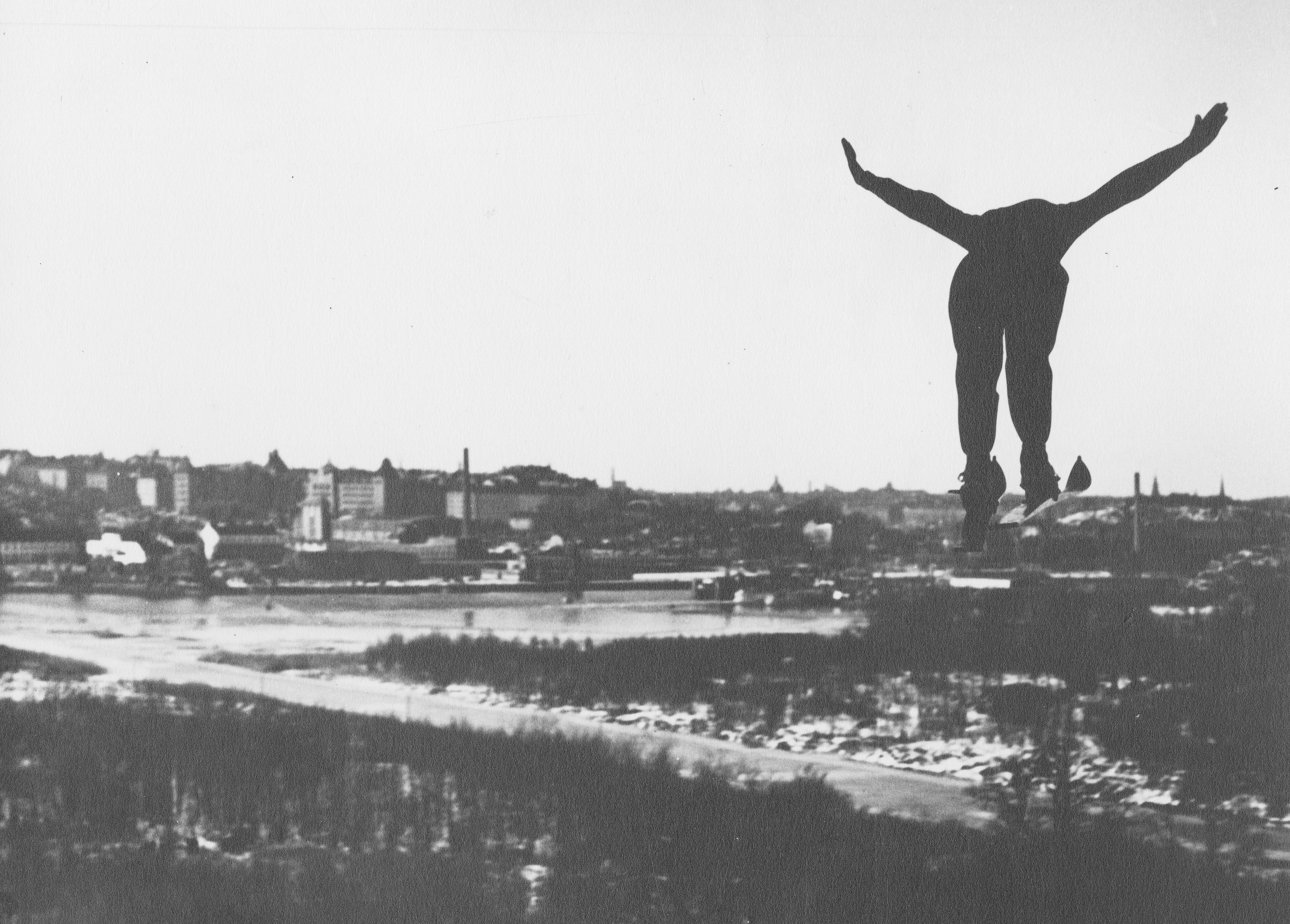
Djurgården alpine skier and ski jumper Harald Hedjerson jumping off Hammarbytoppen in 1934.

Starting in 1936, Olle Tandberg won five consecutive national boxing titles in the men's heavyweight. At the 1936 Summer Olympics, Djurgården wrestler Einar Karlsson again represented Sweden and won a bronze medal, this time in the men's Greco-Roman featherweight event. In 1937, the club won their first Swedish championship titles in alpine skiing – Harald Hedjerson won the men's slalom event and Inga Söderbaum the women's slalom event.

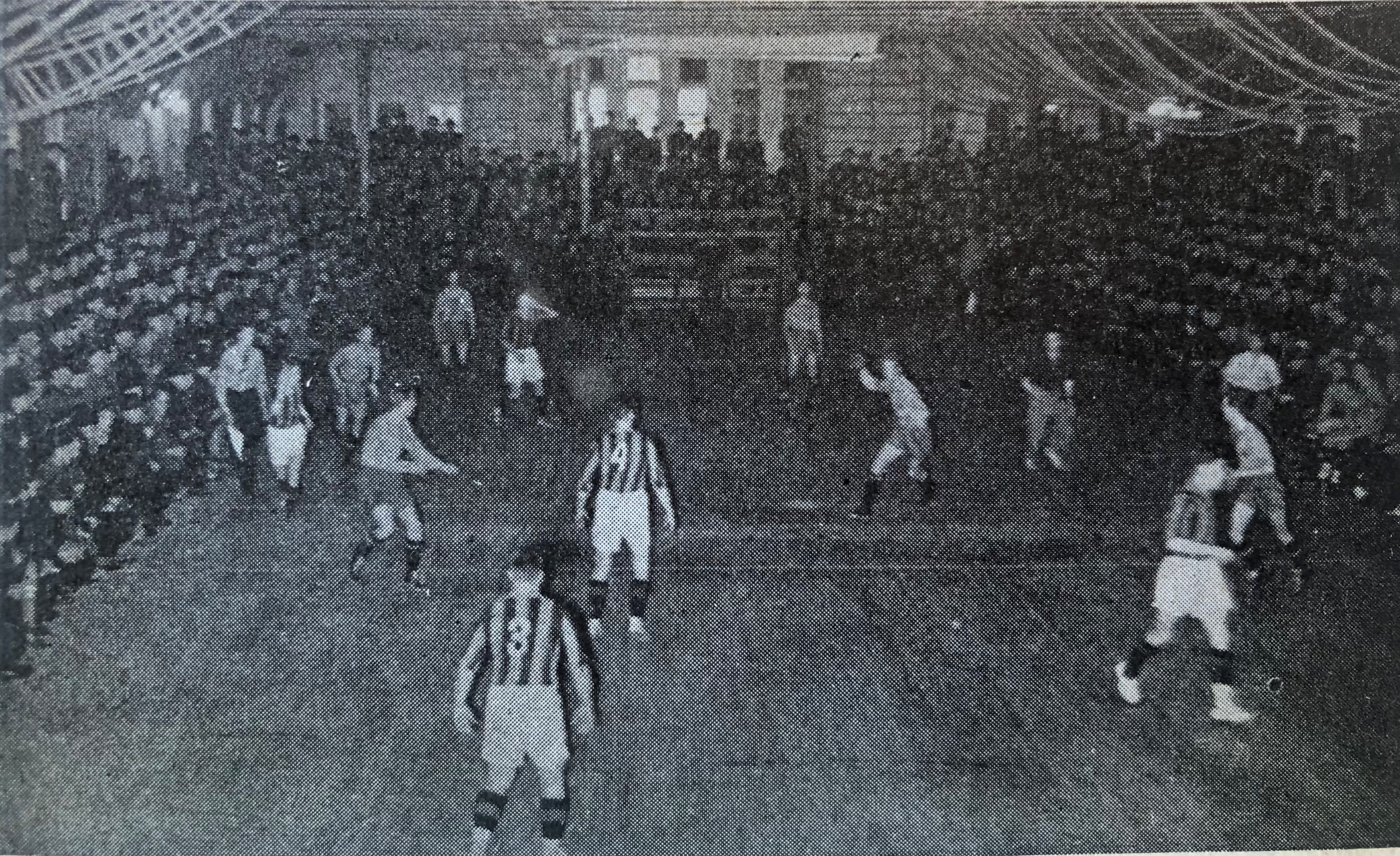
The men's handball team against IFK Kristianstad at Korridoren in the 1939–40 Allsvenskan

In 1938, the men's handball team played in the national championship final but lost. Thereafter, the team played the 1939–40 season and 1939–40 season in Allsvenskan before relegation. After a four-year hiatus, in 1938, Djurgården started its ice hockey team again and began in Klass V.

Up until 1939, Djurgårdens IF had won 167 Swedish championship titles.

=== 1940–1949 ===
In 1941, Barbro Olsson, Maud Cederholm and Dis Cederholm won the women's 10 km team event at the Swedish Cross-Country Skiing Championships, which they repeated in 1942 and again in 1943. In 1942, after 14 years, Bertil Nordenskjöld stepped down as chairman for the club. During the 1940s, the women's bandy team played in a series in Vasaparken in Stockholm together with KSK Artemis, Föreningen GCI, and IK Göta.

In 1948, the club took its first Swedish championship titles in table tennis. At the championship held in Malmö, Tage Flisberg won the men's singles, Flisberg and Arne Neidenmark won the men's doubles, Flisberg, Neidenmark and Bengt Grive won the men's team event and Flisberg, together with of Ingrid Hägglund of Örnsköldsviks BTK, won the mixed doubles.

=== Football and ice hockey heydays (1950–1969) ===
The 1950s and 1960s would see nine Swedish ice hockey championship titles and four Swedish football championship titles for Djurgårdens IF.

In 1950, the men's ice hockey team won its second national title. Between 1952 and 1964, Edvin Vesterby won ten national wrestling titles in the freestyle 57 kg event, missing only 1953, 1958, and 1962. On four occasions during the period he also won the corresponding titles in the Greco-Roman bantamweight event. At the 1952 Winter Olympics, five Djurgården ice hockey players – Hans Andersson-Tvilling, Stig Andersson-Tvilling, Lasse Björn, Gösta Johansson, and Sven Johansson – was part of Sweden's bronze medal winning team in the men's tournament. At the 1952 Summer Olympics, Djurgården footballer Gösta Sandberg was part of Sweden's bronze medal winning team in the tournament.

In 1954, the men's ice hockey team again won the national title, its third. This was repeated in 1955. In 1955, the men's football team won its fifth national title by winning the 1954–55 Allsvenskan. Starting in 1955, the Djurgården women's table tennis team won six consecutive national championship titles – Elisabeth Thorsson took part in all six, Signhild Tegner in five, Ing-Britt Molin in four, and Siv Petersson in three. At the 1956 Summer Olympics, Djurgården wrestler Edvin Vesterby represented Sweden and won a silver medal in the men's Greco-Roman bantamweight event.

In 1955, the men's football team made its debut in European competition and played Gwardia Warsaw of Poland in its first match. The home leg at the Stockholm Olympic Stadium ended 0–0. In the return leg, Djurgården won 4–1, after three goals from John Eriksson and one from Gösta Sandberg, and progressed to the next leg.

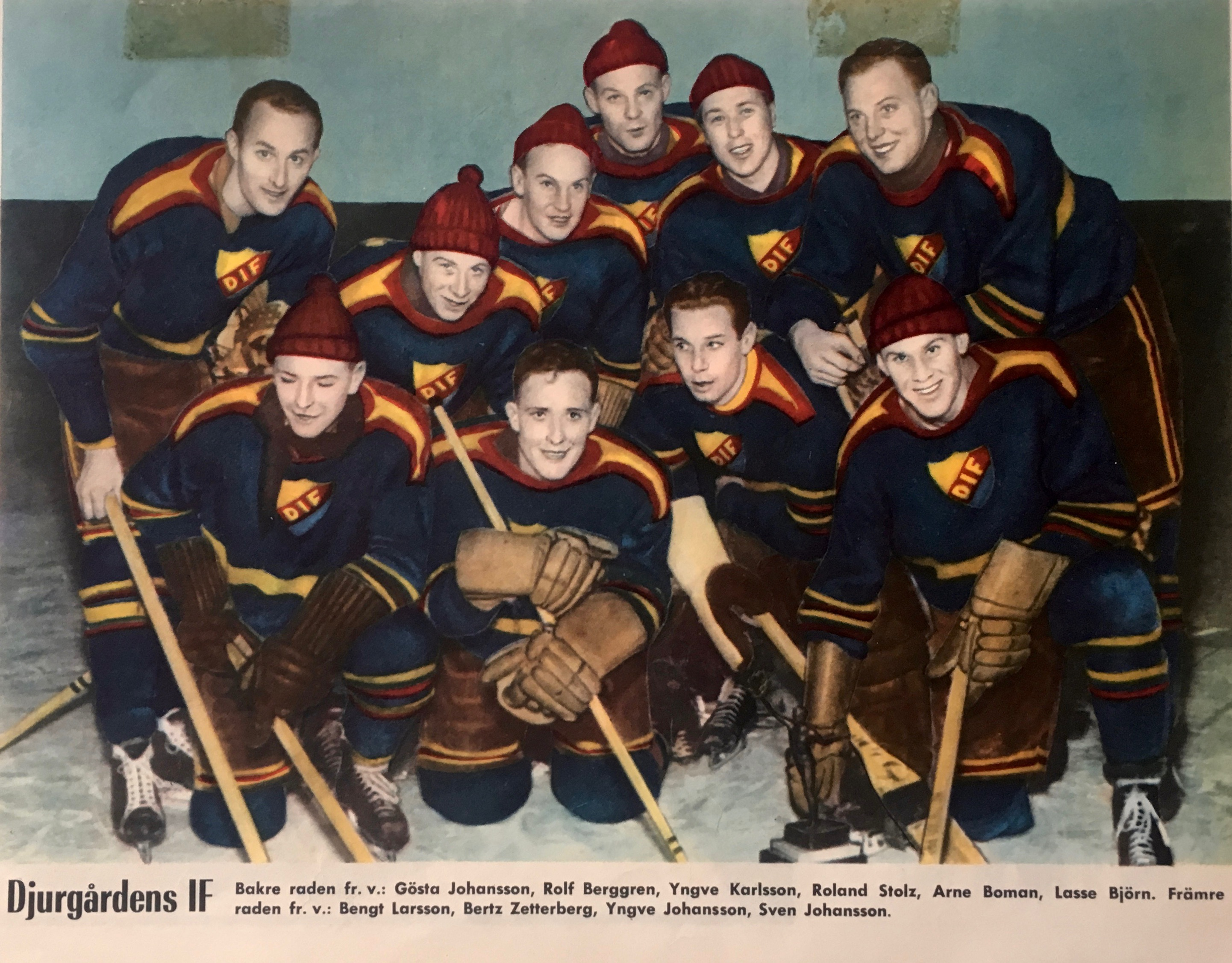
The 1957–58 ice hockey team and Swedish champions. Pictured: rear row from left: Gösta Johansson, Rolf Berggren, Yngve Karlsson, Roland Stoltz, Arne Boman, Lasse Björn; front row from left: Bengt Larsson, Bertz Zetterberg, Yngve Johansson, and Sven Johansson

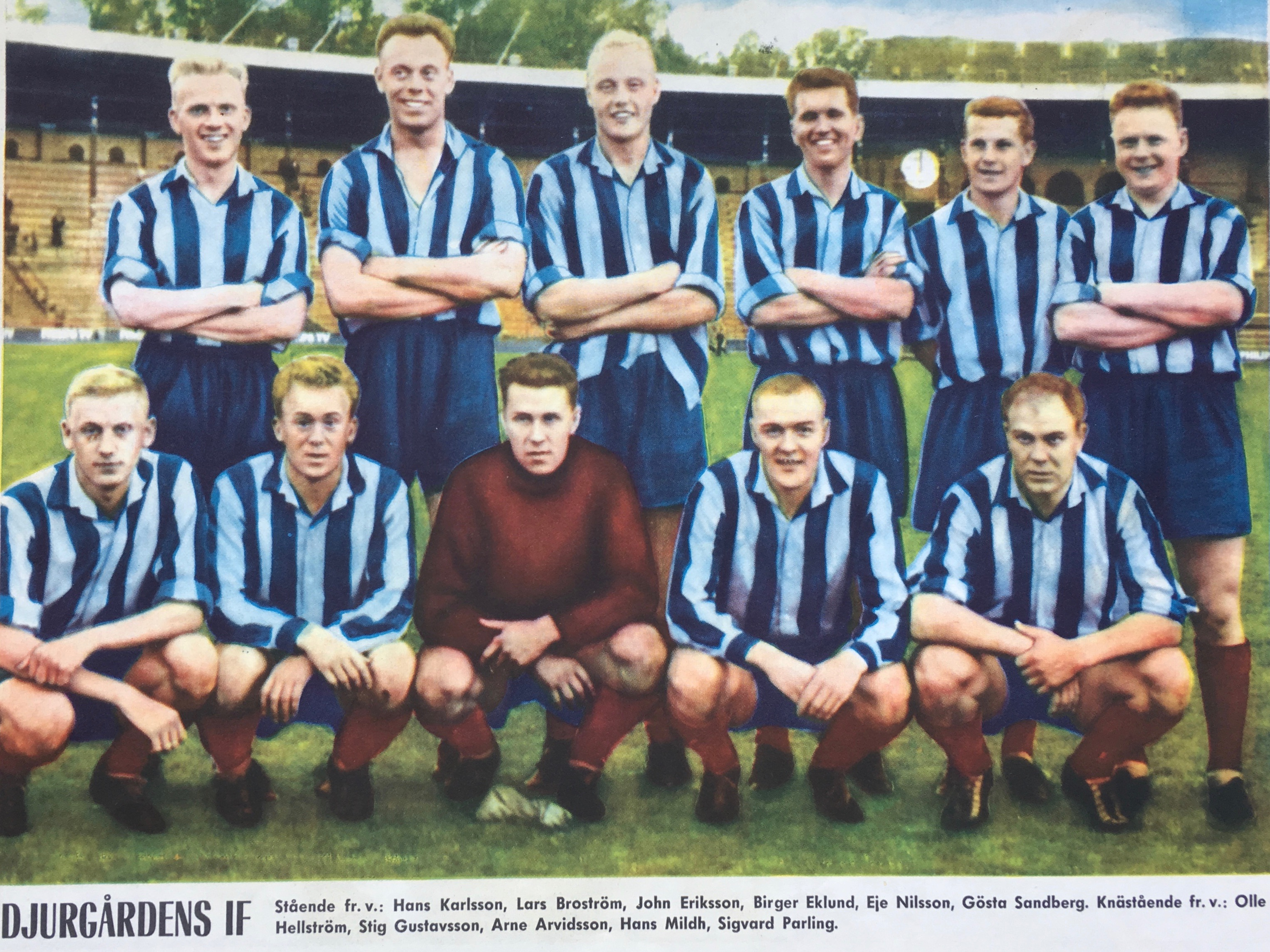
The 1959 football team and Swedish champions. Pictured: rear row from left: Hans Karlsson, Lars Broström, John Eriksson, Birger Eklund, Eje Nilsson, Gösta Sandberg; front row from left: Olle Hellström, Stig Gustafsson, Arne Arvidsson, Hans Mild, and Sigge Parling

In 1958, the men's ice hockey team won its fifth national title and started a period of six consecutive titles until 1963. In 1959, the men's football team won its sixth national title by winning the 1959 Allsvenskan. Djurgården players Hans Mild, Sven Johansson, and Gösta Sandberg were playing in both teams and winning both the 1959 ice hockey and football national titles.

Starting in 1959, Kathinka Frisk won the alpine skiing Swedish championship titles in women's downhill event four consecutive times. In 1960, the club won their first Swedish championship titles in tennis through Jan-Erik Lundqvist, who, together with Ulf Schmidt of AIK, won both the indoors men's doubles and the same event outdoors. In 1961, the men's bandy team again qualified for the top-tier and the 1962 Division 1. In 1962, Djurgården won its first nation championship title in fencing through Elin Eckerbom, Gunilla Tollbom, and Christina Wahlberg who won the women's foil event. The year after, Orvar Lindwall became the first individual fencing Swedish champion of Djurgården, when he won the men's épée event.

At the 1964 Winter Olympics, four Djurgården ice hockey players – Sven Johansson, Hans Mild, Carl-Göran Öberg, Roland Stoltz – was part of Sweden's silver medal winning team in the men's tournament. In 1964, the men's football team won its seventh national title by winning the 1964 Allsvenskan. In 1966, the men's football team won its eighth national title by winning the 1966 Allsvenskan.

From 1965 to 1969, Britt Elfving won five consecutive Swedish Figure Skating Championships in the women's singles event, with the first one marking the first Swedish championship title for the club in figure skating. In 1965, the club also won its first Swedish championship title in bobsleigh, when Carl-Erik Eriksson and Eric Wennerberg won the men's two-man sled event, which they also repeated in 1966.

In 1969, the women's football team entered league play, participating in Stockholms Fotbollförbund's first women's league, the Försöksserien, which they won.

=== 1970–1988 ===
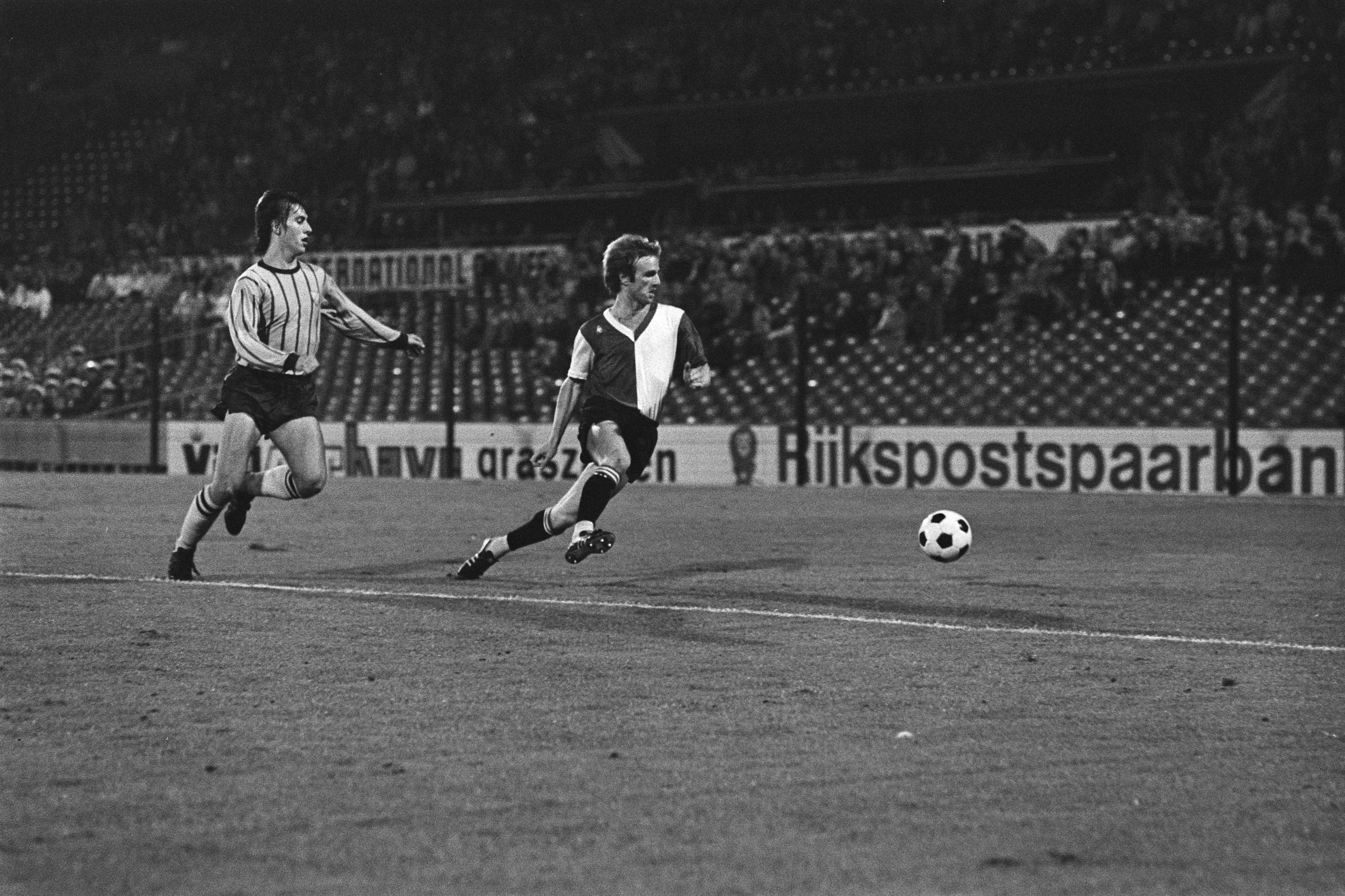
The men's football team against Feyenoord at Feijenoord Stadion, Rotterdam, during the 1976–77 UEFA Cup

Starting in 1972, the Djurgården men's fencing team won four consecutive titles in the men's epée event, with Leif Högström and Hans Jacobson contributing to all four; Göran Andersson and Carl von Essen to three, Jaan Veanes to two and Göran Flodström, Björn Jacobson, Takashi Masuyama and Stefan Pahlefors to one.

In 1974, Sören Johansson became the first Djurgården player to be selected in the NHL entry draft, in the 11th round by Kansas City Scouts. At the 1976 Summer Olympics, Djurgården fencer quartet Carl von Essen, Göran Flodström, Leif Högström, and Hans Jacobson together with LUGI fencer Rolf Edling made the team that won a gold medal in the men's team épée event.

At the 1980 Winter Olympics, four Djurgården ice hockey players – Bo Berglund, Håkan Eriksson, Thomas Eriksson, and Mats Waltin – was part of Sweden's bronze medal winning team in the men's tournament. In 1983, the men's ice hockey team won its eleventh national title. At the 1984 Winter Olympics, seven Djurgården ice hockey players – Håkan Eriksson, Tommy Mörth, Jens Öhling, Rolf Ridderwall, Håkan Södergren, Michael Thelvén, and Mats Waltin – was part of Sweden's bronze medal winning team in the men's tournament.

Starting in 1987, the men's épée fencing team won three consecutive national championship titles, this time with Otto Drakenberg, Ulf Sandegren, and Péter Vánky contributing to three of them, while Arne Johansson took part in two and Henrik Pontén in one.

At the 1988 Winter Olympics, four Djurgården ice hockey players – Thomas Eriksson, Mikael Johansson, Jens Öhling, and Håkan Södergren – was part of Sweden's bronze medal winning team in the men's tournament.

At the 1988 Summer Olympics, Djurgården boxer Lars Myrberg represented Sweden and won a bronze medal in the men's light welterweight event.

=== Centennial club and organisational changes (1989–1999) ===
In 1989, the men's ice hockey team moved to Globen. In 1989, the men's ice hockey team won the national title by beating Leksands IF with 3–1 in matches. It was their twelfth national title and was then repeated in 1990 and 1991. The men's handball team withdrew in the 1989–90 season. In the 1989–90 IIHF European Cup, the men's ice hockey team finished second in after Dynamo Moscow – the tournament after, the 1990 IIHF European Cup, they faced Dynamo Moscow in the finals and won, an achievement they also repeated in 1991 edition.

At the turn of the decade into the 1990s, Djurgården saw financial troubles with the risk of bankruptcy. As a solution to the economic difficulties, a split of the departments into separate entities was proposed in 1990, with the football department taking 3 million SEK of the deficit and the ice hockey department taking 6 million SEK. In 1991, Djurgården was reorganised to an alliance club. The one club then became 16 clubs. The same year, Djurgården celebrated their 100 years of existence with a dinner at the Stockholm City Hall. By the centennial jubilee, Gösta Sandberg was chosen Djurgården person of the century by the club's members. In 1991–92 season, the men's floorball team began play in Division 5.

At the 1994 Winter Olympics, Djurgården ice hockey players Charles Berglund and Christian Due-Boje was part of Sweden's gold medal winning team in the men's tournament. In 1996, Djurgården became Swedish champions in pétanque for the first time through a team of Charlotta Brohult, Bengt Håkansson] and Kenneth Öttenius who competed in the open event. In the autumn of 1997, the ice hockey club tried to corporise and register on the Stockholm Stock Exchange, however the Swedish Sports Confederation denied their request. In 1999, the women's football team became Swedish champions in indoor five-a-side with a team consisting of Carolina Crevatin, Elin Flyborg, Tina Karlsson, Tina Kindvall, Aleksandra Maksimovic, Salina Olsson, Karin Sandbrink, Kickan Sigridsson, Jacinta Sjöblom, Malin Söderlind, Jessika Sundh, and Sara Thunebro.

In 1999, the bandy team was discontinued but restarted again after a one-year hiatus in 2000.

=== Into the new millennium (2000–2006) ===
In 2000, the men's ice hockey team won the national title, its 15th. This was repeated in 2001.

In 2002, for the first time in 36 years, the men's football team won the 2002 Allsvenskan and its ninth Swedish champion title. The title was secured in a 2–0 win against IF Elfsborg with goals from Johan Elmander and Andreas Johansson. The following year, the team repeated its achievement and won the 2003 Allsvenskan and its tenth national title.

For the 2002–03 Elitserien season, the then lower-tier men's handball club joined forces with BK Söder in the league competing as Djurgården.

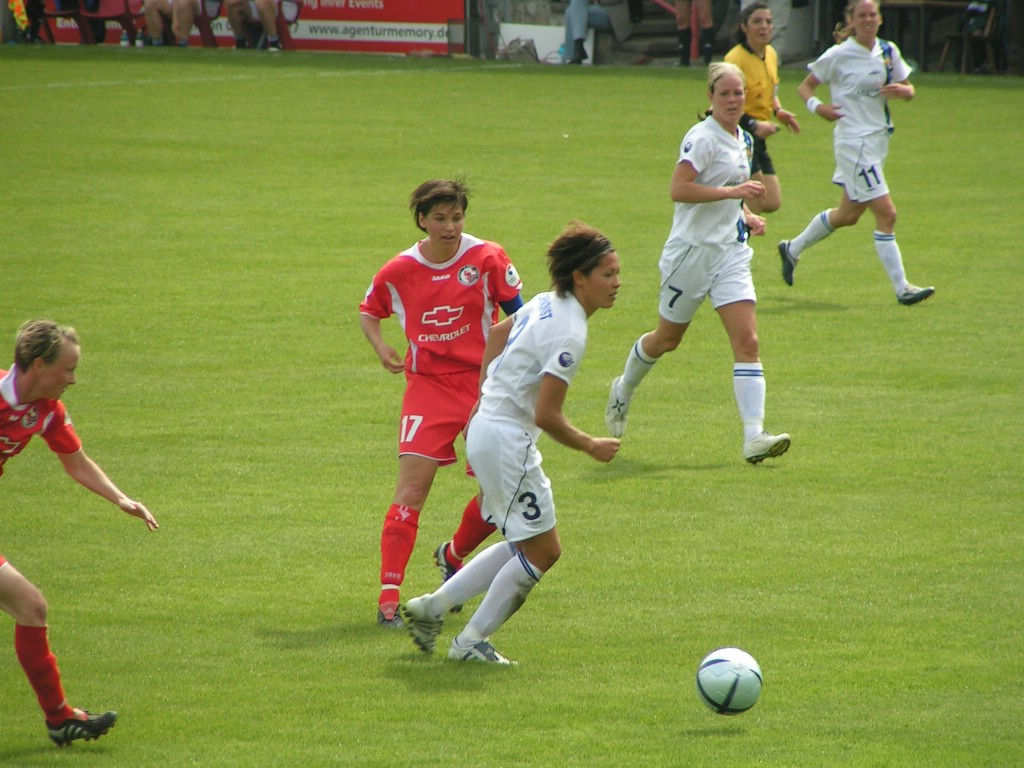
Djurgården/Älvsjö against 1. FFC Turbine Potsdam during the 2005 UEFA Women's Cup final in Potsdam, Germany

For the 2003 season, the women's football club merged with Älvsjö AIK to create Djurgården/Älvsjö. The new team won Damallsvenskan on its first try and repeated the achievement the following season. In 2005, Djurgården/Älvsjö reached the UEFA Women's Cup final which they lost to 1. FFC Turbine Potsdam with 1–5 in a two-legged final. In 2005, the men's football team won its eleventh national title by winning the 2005 Allsvenskan.

=== 2006–2018 ===
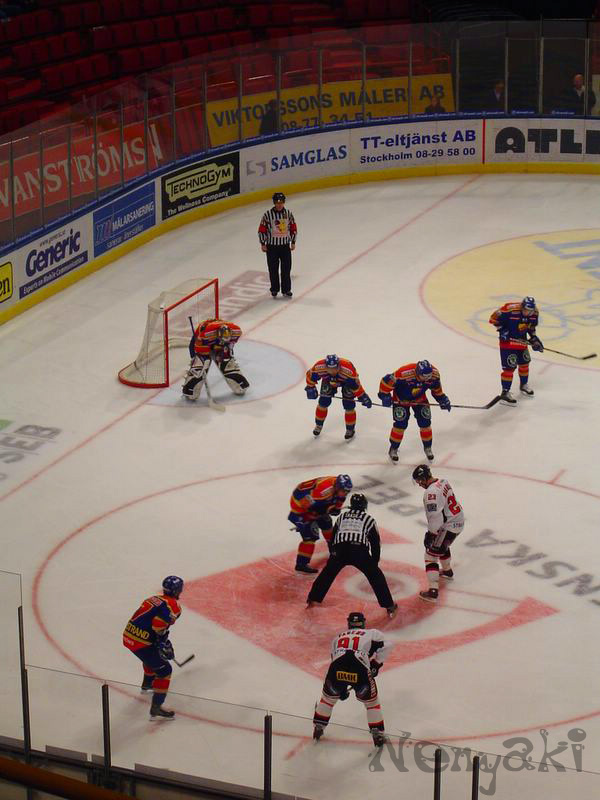
The men's ice hockey team against Malmö Redhawks in Globen in the 2006–07 Elitserien season

It had become possible for Swedish clubs to create aktiebolag inside sports clubs that were members to the Swedish Sports Confederation in 1999. In 2006, the men's football club was corporised to Djurgården Elitfotboll AB, and the ice hockey club and its two junior teams followed in 2008, with shares sold to Anschutz Entertainment Group.

Starting in 2006, Bashir Hassan won five consecutive national boxing titles in the men's featherweight. In 2007, the men's ice hockey team moved back to Hovet.

For the 2010–11 season of Swedish floorball, the women's team of Balrog Botkyrka IK merged into the Djurgårdens IF floorball club. In April 2011, during the following season, the team won the Djurgårdens IF's first Swedish championship title in floorball. In March 2012, the men's ice hockey team was relegated from the top-tier from their result in the 2012 Kvalserien. In 2013, the men's handball first team withdrew.

In late 2013, Djurgårdens IF men's and women's football clubs merged to one club. In March 2014, the men's floorball team joined forces with second-tier team Capeirotäby FC for the coming 2014–15 season. In April 2014, it was reported the women's floorball team had financial difficulties and risked becoming bankrupt. In 2014, Djurgården took over Segeltorps IF license in the women's ice hockey second tier, creating a women's ice hockey team of Djurgården. For the 2014–15 season, the men's bandy team merged with Spånga/Bromstens BK. In 2016, the martial arts club won its first two Swedish championship titles – Mehmet Kaya in men's kickboxing and Sandra Godvik in women's Muay Thai. At the 2016 Summer Olympics, Djurgården footballer Emilia Appelqvist was part of Sweden's silver medal winning team in the women's tournament. In March 2017, it was reported the men's floorball team was close to bankruptcy. In March 2017, the women's ice hockey team won its first national title, beating HV71 in the final.

=== 2019–present ===
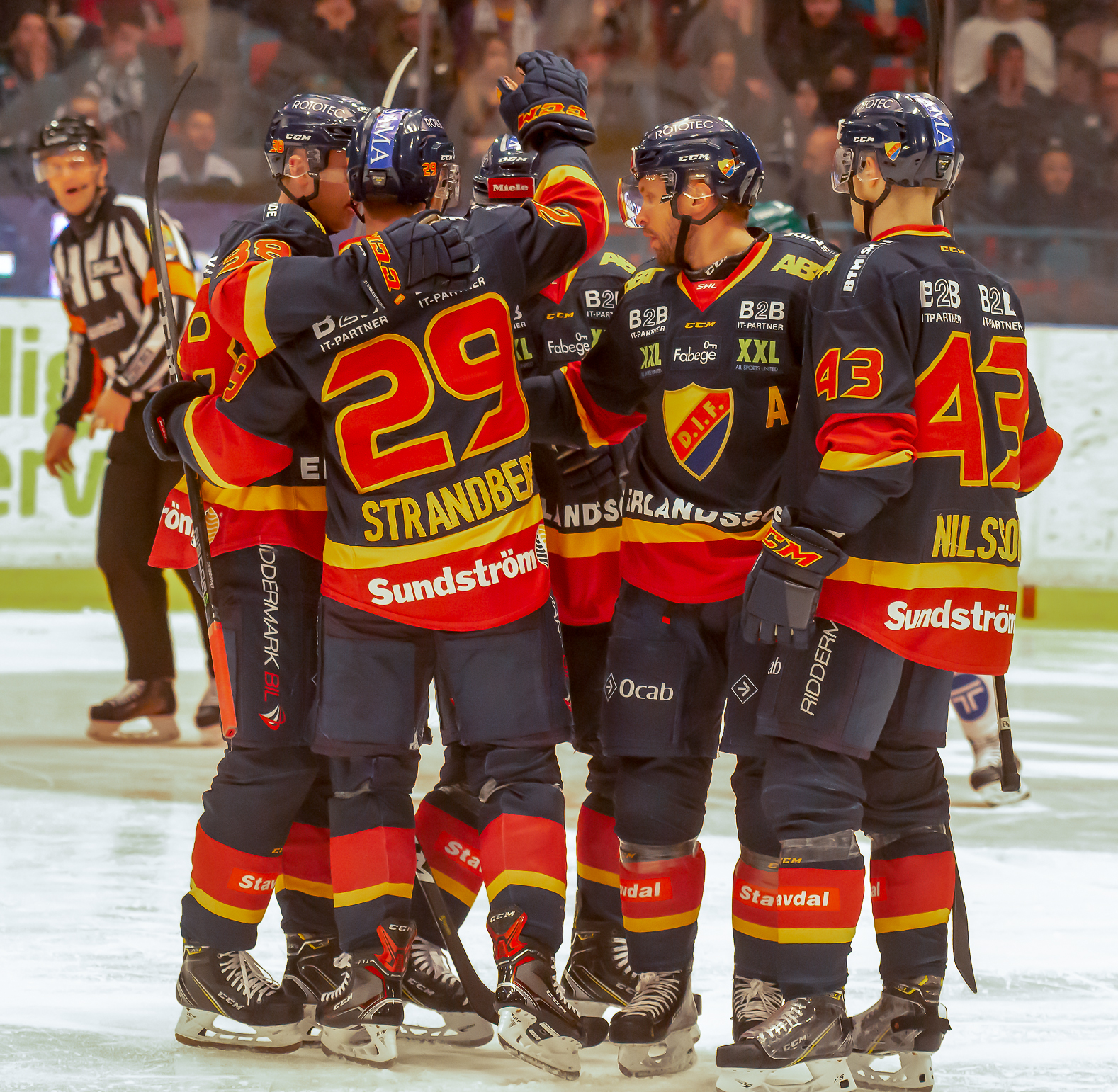
The men's ice hockey team players celebrating a goal by Sebastian Strandberg against Färjestad BK during the 2018–19 Swedish Hockey League season

In 2019,the men's football team won its twelfth national title by winning the 2019 Allsvenskan. In the 2019–20 Basketligan season, the men's basketball team was participating for the first time in the series. In 2020, the football club and the ice hockey club engaged to cooperate with schools in the Stockholm area to improve physical activity. The 2020s saw the introduction cricket in 2020, padel in 2020, and chess in 2023 in the Djurgården organisation. In 2021, the men's floorball team entered the national top flight Swedish Super League, however the team was relegated after only one season. In 2022, the cricket club became Swedish champions in cricket for the first time, this time in the women's event. In 2022, a women's beach soccer Swedish championship title was added to the list, the first of the sport in Djurgården. At the end of the 2021–22 SHL season, the men's ice hockey team was relegated after eight years in Swedish Hockey League (SHL) by losing to Timrå IK in the relegation play-offs.

On 1 January 2023, the two football first teams became the same entity financially when the women's team was moved to Djurgårdens Elitfotboll AB. In 2023, the ice hockey club loaned 10 million SEK from the football club to cover deficits. In April 2025, the men's ice hockey team returned to the top tier SHL by beating AIK in the SHL qualifiers final, while the men's football team had advanced to the semi-finals of the 2024–25 UEFA Conference League, which they lost to Chelsea.

== Emblem and colours ==
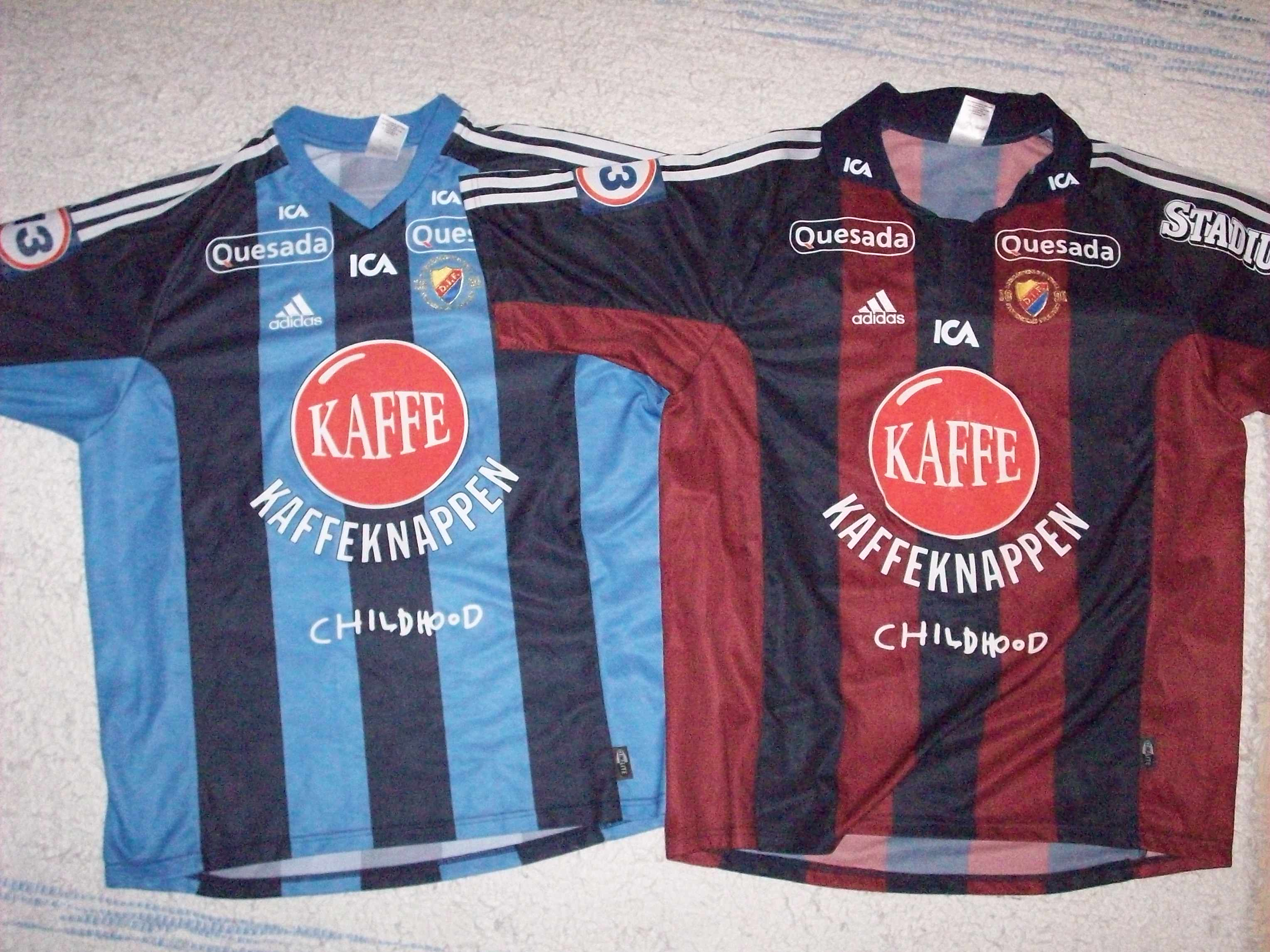
Djurgårdens IF home and away jerseys in football in 2002.

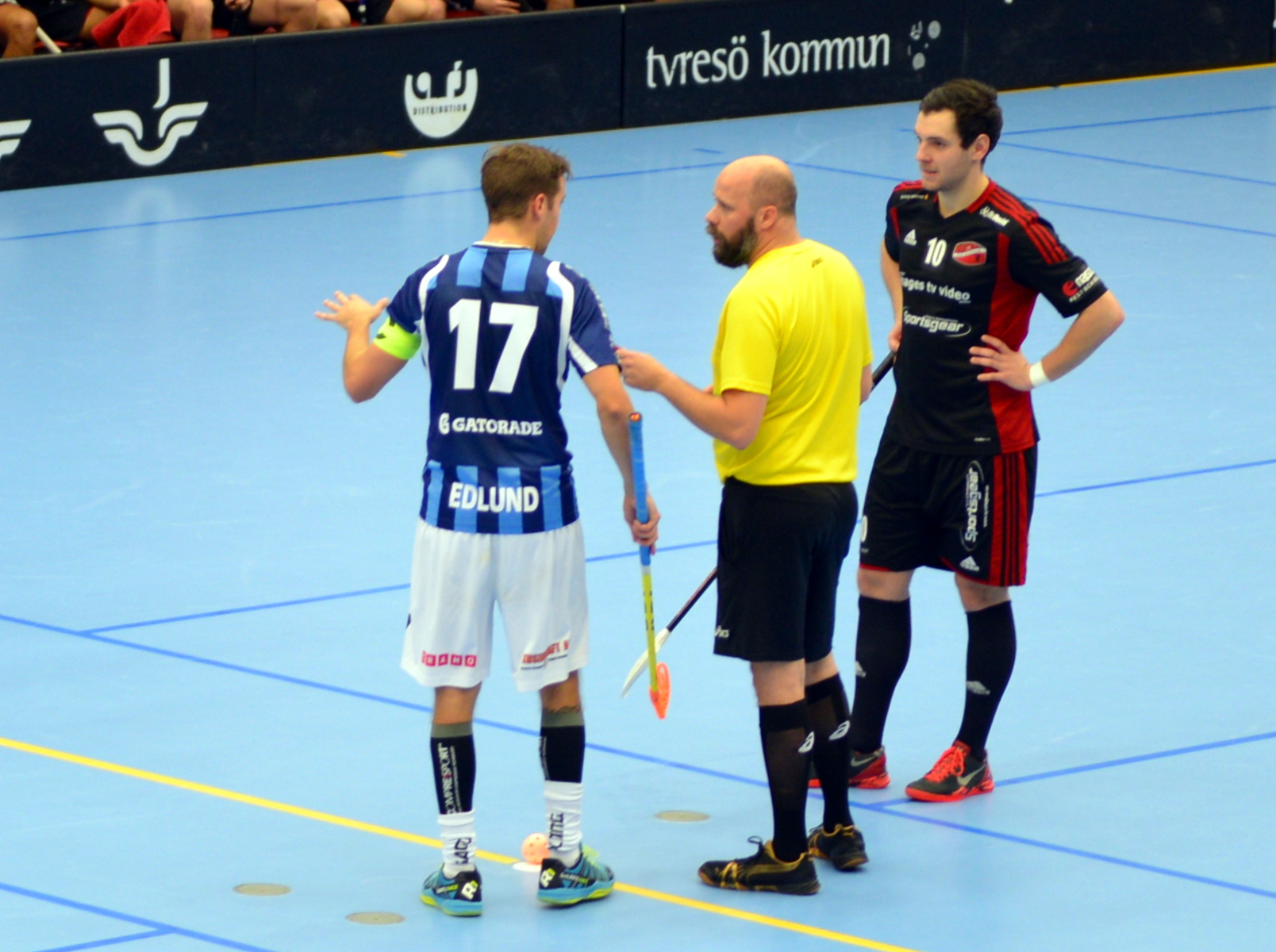
Djurgården player (left) during floorball match against Tyresö Trollbäcken IBK in 2014

The first emblem of the club was a four-pointed silver star in saltire, which had a shield on it with the letters DIF. This star pre-dates the similar star which Idrottsföreningen Kamraterna adopted and is using to this day. The present emblem, in the form of a shield in yellow, red and blue with the text D.I.F. was adopted in 1896. According to an often-quoted poem by Johan af Klercker from 1908, blue and yellow stand for Sweden and red stands for love. Blue and yellow are also the colours of Stockholm.

Yellow, red and blue are the club colours. The logo is registered as a trademark and the colours are set to Pantone, CMYK and web colour values. In many sports – among them football, bandy and handball – the home jersey of the team is vertically striped in light and dark blue. Because of this, blue is usually seen as the most important of the three colours. Shorts have been either dark or white. The ice hockey team uses jerseys in one blue shade with yellow and red details.

In other sports, Djurgården also have used black tricots with blue lampasses (athletics and boxing) and blue tricots with a club badge (wrestling).

In Sport & affärer and Demoskop's research about the strongest brand among Swedish clubs 2025, Djurgårdens IF was positioned second after AIK and ahead of Malmö FF.

== Sports ==
Djurgårdens IF has several member sections, all of which legally are their own associations with their own financial and sporting responsibilities but share the common name, logo and values and support each other.

As of 2025, the club has won 478 Swedish championships in 25 different sports.

=== List of sports ===
Sport		Started	Ended	Home venue	Organisational notes	Ref.
alpine skiing		1930s		Hammarbybacken		
American football Djurgårdens IF Amerikansk fotboll		2004	2022			
athletics		1892		Stockholm Olympic Stadium	restarted 2024	
bandy Djurgårdens IF Bandy				Östermalms IP, Gubbängens bandyhall	on hiatus 1999–2000; merged with Spånga/Bromstens BK for the 2014–15 season	
basketball Djurgårdens IF Basket		2015				
bobsleigh						
bowling		1919				
boxing Djurgårdens IF Boxningsförening		unknown				
chess		2023				
contract bridge						
cricket		2020		Skarpnäcks cricketplan	Stockholms Akademiska Cricketsällskap (founded 1996) joined Djurgårdens IF in 2020	
curling		1951	1975			
cycling		unknown			restarted 1960	
fencing Djurgårdens IF Fäktförening		1958		Djurgårdens fäktsal, Hjorthagshallen		
figure skating						
floorball		1990		Hjorthagshallen	women's team created from Balrog Botkyrka IK in 2010; men's team merged with Capeirotäby FC in 2014	
football (including beach soccer and futsal)	(men's football); Djurgårdens IF Fotboll	1899		3Arena	women's club merged with Älvsjö AIK for the 2003 season; women's club joined the men's club in 2013; men's and women's first team is the same AB since 2022	
football (including beach soccer and futsal)	(women's football); Djurgårdens IF Fotboll (women)	1899		Stockholm Olympic Stadium	women's club merged with Älvsjö AIK for the 2003 season; women's club joined the men's club in 2013; men's and women's first team is the same AB since 2022	
football (including beach soccer and futsal)	futsal	1899		Hjorthagshallen	women's club merged with Älvsjö AIK for the 2003 season; women's club joined the men's club in 2013; men's and women's first team is the same AB since 2022	
football (including beach soccer and futsal)	beach soccer	1899			women's club merged with Älvsjö AIK for the 2003 season; women's club joined the men's club in 2013; men's and women's first team is the same AB since 2022	
football (para)		1997		Hjorthagens IP		
golf		1996				
gymnastics						
handball Djurgårdens IF Handboll		1934		Hjorthagshallen	on hiatus 1990–2000; men's team merged with BK Söder in 2002; on hiatus from 2013 until unknown	
ice hockey	(men's); Djurgårdens IF (men's hockey)	1922		Hovet	on hiatus 1934–1938; women's team created from Segeltorps IF in 2014	
ice hockey	(women's); Djurgårdens IF (women's hockey)	1922			on hiatus 1934–1938; women's team created from Segeltorps IF in 2014	
kicksled						
martial arts		2013		Stockholm Olympic Stadium		
Nordic skiing						
orienteering						
padel		2020				
pétanque		1995		Liljeholmshallen		
racewalking						
rowing						
shooting sports		1905	1931			
speed skating						
squash		1975	1988		Squashklubben Oden joined Djurgårdens IF in 1975	
swimming and water polo			1906		became SK Neptun	
table tennis		1947				
tennis		1959	1963		became Malmens TK	
tug of war						
weightlifting						
women's sports		1928				
wrestling		1911		Vällingbyhallen		

== Venues ==
Some home venues of Djurgårdens IF

=== Norra innerstaden ===
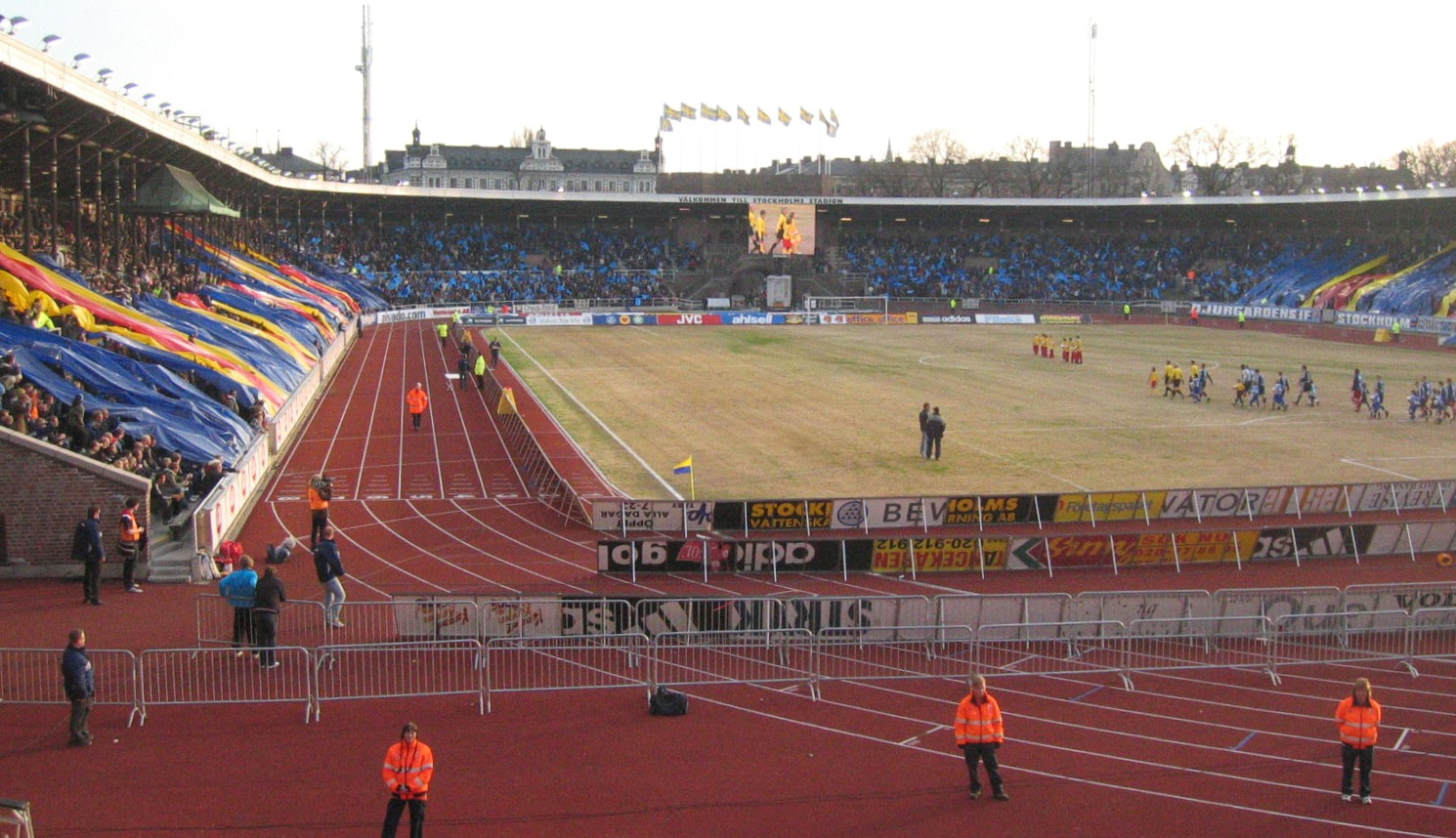
The Stockholm Olympic Stadium in 2006 during a match between the men's football team and IFK Göteborg in the 2006 Allsvenskan

The Stockholm Olympic Stadium has been the home for many sports of Djurgårdens IF. It was the home for the men's football team until 2013. It had then been their home since 1936. Despite this, during those 77 years, the men’s football team played some, sometimes all, matches of the season at Råsunda Stadium. The Olympic Stadium is the home for the women’s football team. The athletics clubs also uses the stadium. The men's ice hockey team used the Olympic Stadium from 1922 until it moved to Hovet in 1962. It was also the home for figure skating 1957–1964. It was used by the men’s bandy team until 1970. The mixed martial arts club has its premises in Klocktornet of the stadium. Djurgårdens IF has a trophy room in Sofiatornet of the Stockholm Olympic Stadium. The boxing department used Sofiatornet at the Olympic Stadium from 1917 to 1922.

Östermalms IP is used for bandy since 2017. Östermalms IP has been used by the women’s football team. The boxing department used Östermalms IP from 1932 to 1934.

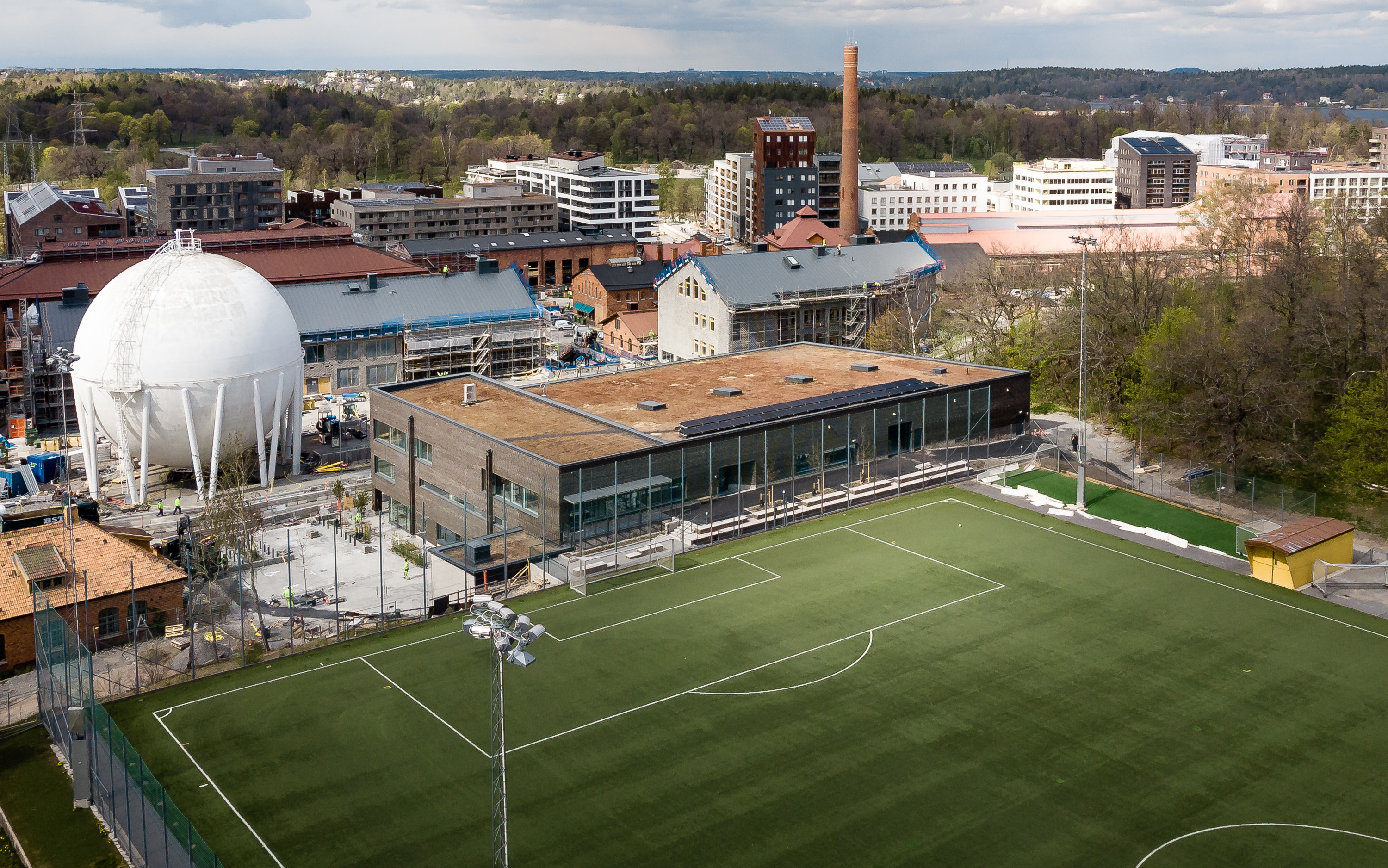
Hjorthagens IP and Hjorthagshallen in 2019

Hjorthagens IP has been the home for the women’s football team. It is the home of the para football club. Close-by, Hjorthagshallen was built in 2019. It is the home for the floorball club, the handball club, the fencing club and the futsal team. Djurgårdens fäktsal, also in Hjorthagen, is used by the fencing club.

Östermalmshallen was used for bowling during the 1930s and 1940s. Gärdeshallen was used for handball during the 1960s. Kampementshallen was used for squash 1975–1988. Svea artilleriregemente was used by the wrestling department 1911–1923.

Kungliga tennishallen was used for the men's basketball team's first home match in the 2019–20 Basketligan season, which was their first match in the top-tier. It had also been used by the men's handball team for one match in 2010.

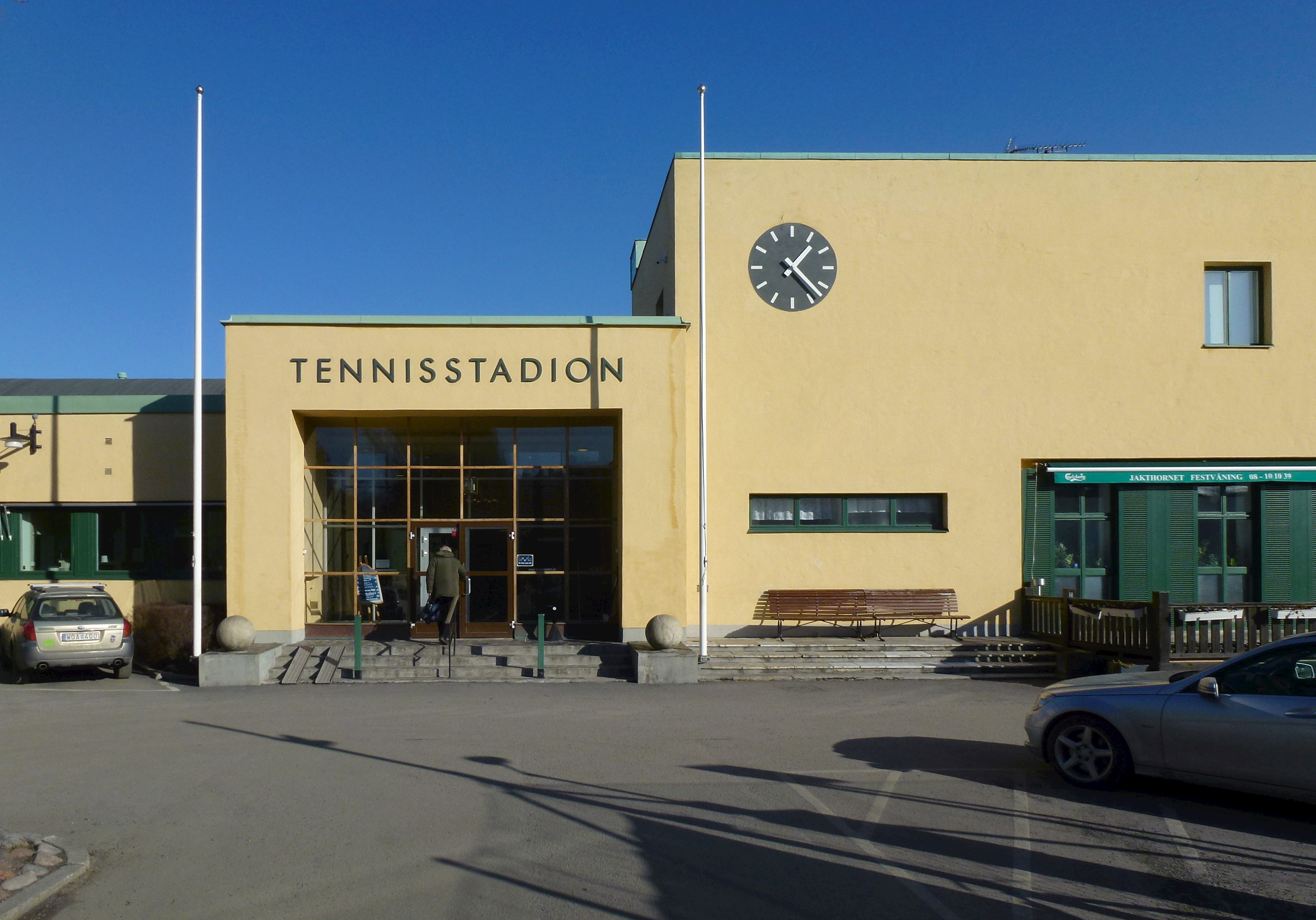
Tennisstadion in 2015

Tennisstadion was used for tennis during the 1960s and for curling during the 1950s and 1960s. Stockholms badmintonhall was used for table tennis during the 1950s and 1960s. Fiskartorpsbacken was used for ski jumping.

Östermalms läroverk was used by the boxing department from 1922 to 1924. Nationalpalatset was used by the boxing department from 1929 to 1932 and from 1934 to 1935. Centralbadet was used by the boxing department from 1976 to 1986. Exercishuset was used for handball during the 1930s.

The wrestling department had their premises at the street Döbelnsgatan from 1923 until the 1960s. The boxing department also resided on the same Döbelnsgatan address 1924–1929. From 1935 to 1936, The boxing department resided on the street Birger Jarlsgatan, and from 1936 to 1944, it resided by Sankt Eriksplan. Since 2014, the boxing club is residing at the street Tomtebogatan.

Kaknäs IP is the training ground for the men’s football team .

=== Kungsholmen ===
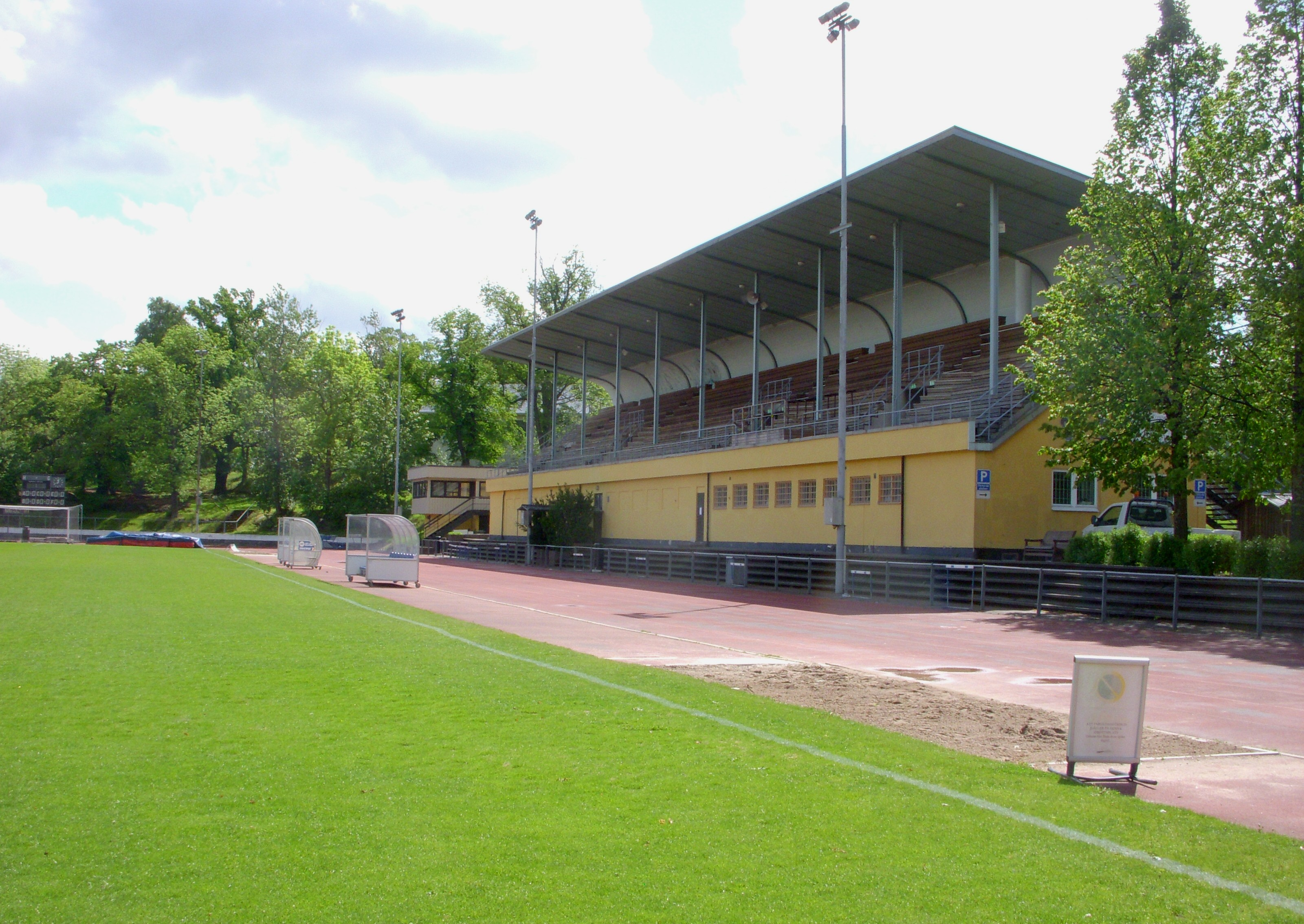
Kristinebergs IP in 2011

Kristinebergs IP has been used by the women’s football team. It is the training ground for the women’s football team. Kristinebergs IP was used by the men's ice hockey team for some matches during the 1940s.

Polishusets gymnastiksal was used by the boxing club from 1927 to 1928. The boxing department resided at the street Pontonjärsgatan from 1944 to 1975, then later at the street Kronobergsgatan from 1986 to 1992, and at the street Norra Agnegatan from 1992 to 2014.

=== Södermalm ===
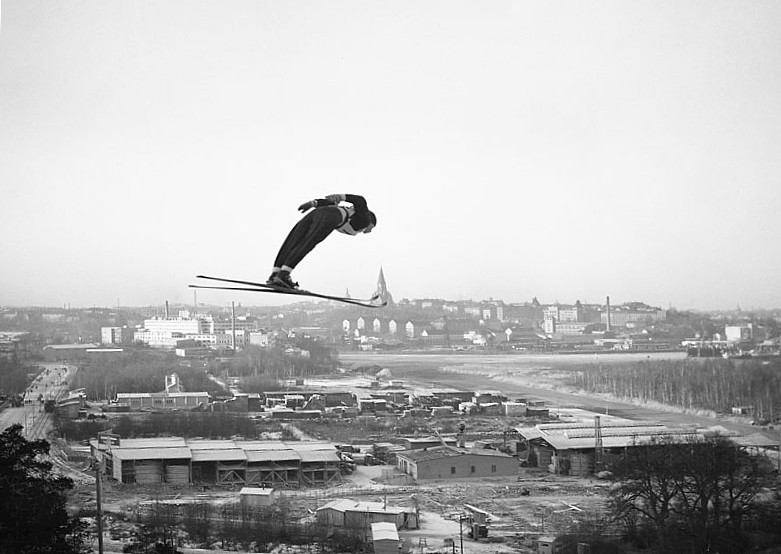
Ski jumping from Hammarbytoppen in 1953, view towards Södermalm

Eriksdalshallen has been used for boxing galas by the boxing club. It has been the home for the men's handball team. It was used for men's handball from the 1940s and for women's handball during the 1940s and 1950s. Zinkensdamms IP has been used by the bandy team.

Hammarbytoppen was used for ski jumping during the 1940s and 1950s, and for alpine skiing from 1964 to 1971 and from 1978 to 1984. Hammarbybacken at Hammarbytoppen is again the home for alpine skiing.

=== Southern Stockholm – Enskede–Årsta–Vantör, Hägersten–Älvsjö, Skärholmen, Farsta and Skarpnäck ===
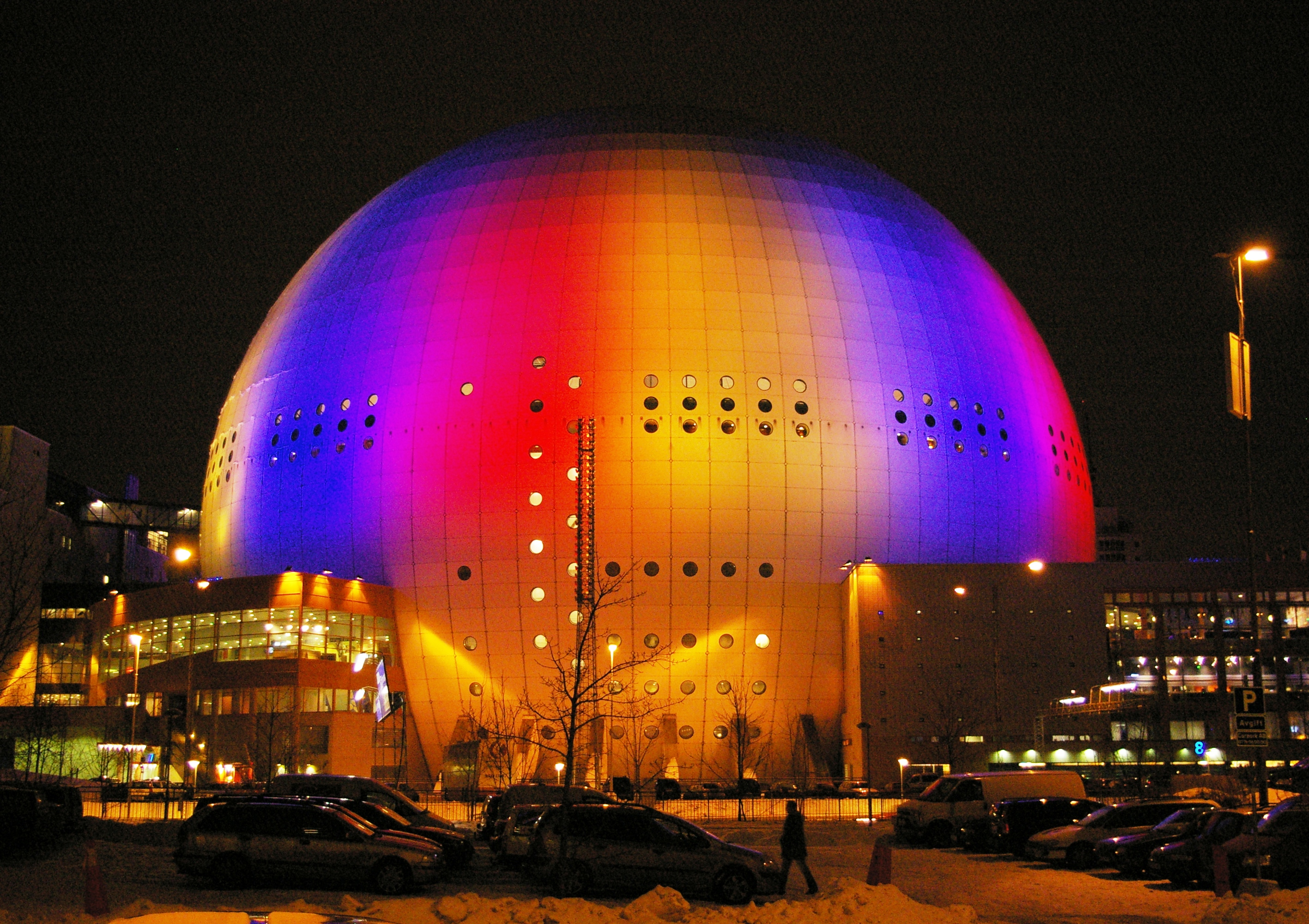
Avicii Arena lit in Djurgården colours

Hovet was used by the men's ice hockey team from 1955 until it quit for Globen in 1989. In 1963, it became covered. It has been the home for the men's ice hockey team again since 2007.

Avicii Arena was the home arena for the men's ice hockey team between 1989 and 2007. 3Arena is used by the men’s football team since 2013. Söderstadion was used for the men’s bandy team from 1970 to 1982.

Enskedehallen was used for table tennis and the women's handball team from the 1960s. It was also used for wrestling and boxing competitions. Gubbängens bandyhall is used for bandy when weather don't permit outdoor play.

Brännkyrkahallen has been used by the basketball club. Liljeholmshallen is used by the pétanque club. Vårby bowlinghall has been used for bowling.

Skarpnäcks cricketplan on Skarpnäcks sportfält is the home of the cricket club. Nybohovsbacken was the home for alpine skiing during the 1970s. Högdalstoppen was used for alpine skiing from 1989.

=== Western Stockholm – Bromma, Hässelby–Vällingby and Järva ===
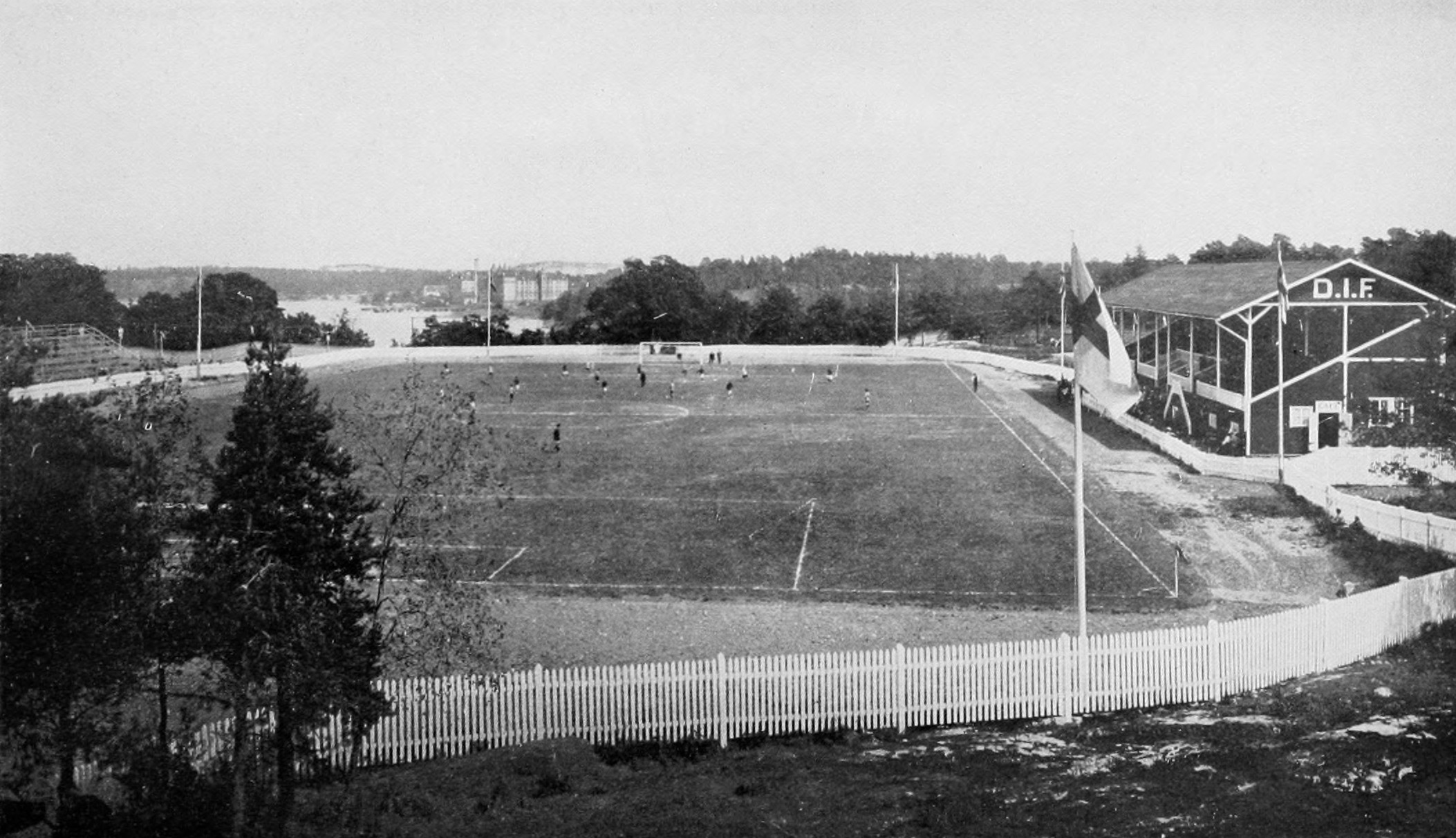
Tranebergs IP c. 1912

Tranebergs IP was the home of the men’s football team from 1911 to 1935. Stora mossens IP has been used by the women's ice hockey team. It has also been also used for figure skating.

Vällingbyhallen is the home of the wrestling club since 1988. Åkeshovshallen was the home of the wrestling club from the 1960s to 1988. Spånga IP has been used by the bandy team. It was also used 1978 to 1982 by the bandy team.

=== Outside Stockholm Municipality ===
Råsunda Stadium was used for the men’s football team in 2004. Also during the 1950s, 1960s, the 1989 and 1990 seasons, the men’s football team played most or all their matches at Råsunda Stadium. In 1989 and 1990 it was due to renovation of the Olympic Stadium. Other high-risk matches have been played there.

From the 1890s to 1936, the club had a ski jumping hill at Saltsjöbadens vinterstadion in Saltsjöbaden. In 1936, it became a skiing slope instead for the clubs's alpine skiers. The men's ice hockey team played at the Saltsjöbadens vinterstadion from 1922 to 1934.

== Supporters and supporter culture ==
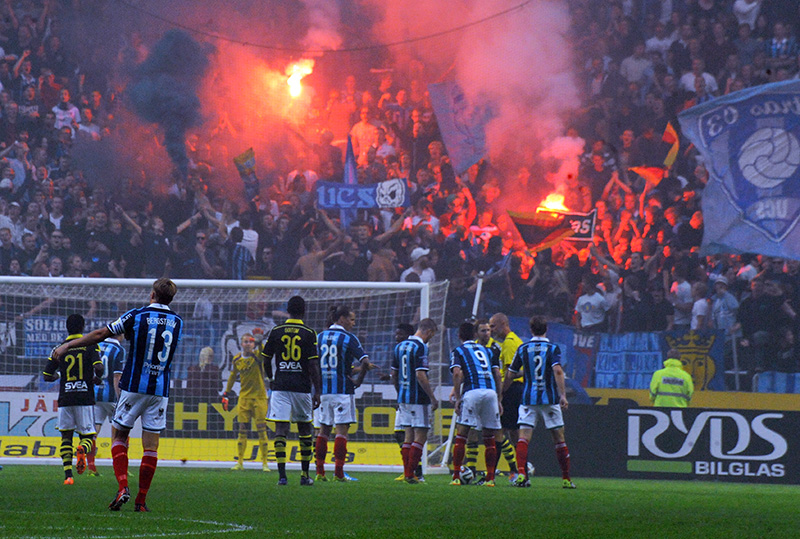
Djurgården supporters during Tvillingderbyt against AIK during the 2014 Allsvenskan season.

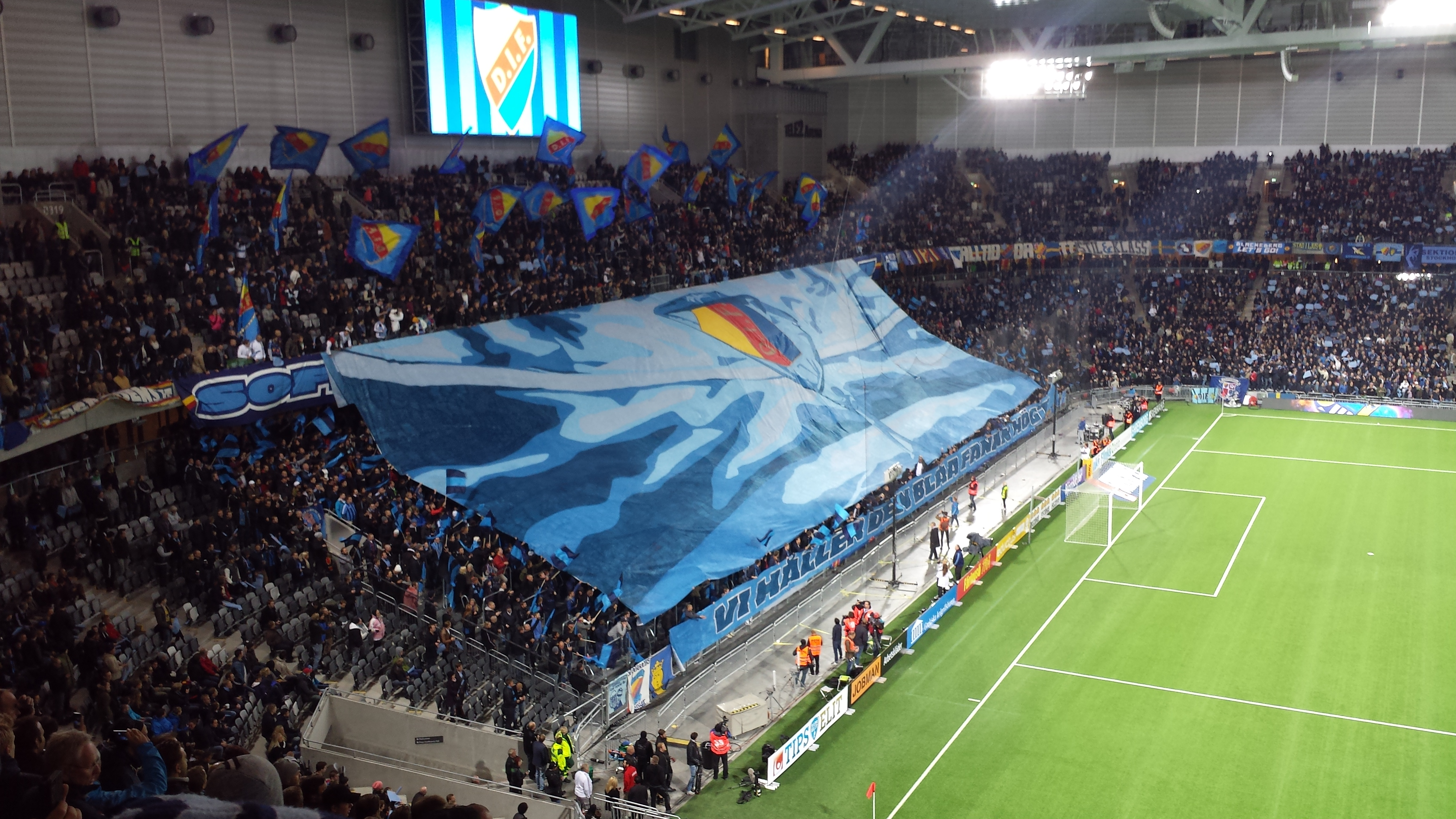
Djurgården tifo duringTvillingderbyt against AIK during the 2013 Allsvenskan season.

Djurgården is one of the most supported clubs in Sweden, with most of its supporters living in Stockholm and the neighbouring suburbs. While other Stockholm clubs have profiled themselves as belonging to a certain borough of Stockholm, Djurgården is seen as more of a pan-Stockholm club. No reliable research exists about the spread of Djurgården supporters, but a 2015 T-shirt campaign suggests that supporters are spread fairly evenly throughout the Stockholm area.

In 1981, the main supporter club "Blue Saints" was formed, but due to its notorious supporters and their bad reputation, the supporter club changed its name to Järnkaminerna (lit. 'the Iron Furnaces'; an old nickname for Djurgården athletes from the 1950s). Sofia Tifo is Djurgården's tifo group. A 2024 all-Allsvenskan communiqué from ultras against throwing of pyrotechnics mentioned two groups connected to Djurgårdens IF: Ultra Caos Stockholm and Långa gatan Stockholm.

Djurgården is probably one of a few clubs in the world who is represented both in space (by Christer Fuglesang) and in the Himalayas (by Raul Helander).

Through the years, many types of souvenirs and memorabilia has been made for the club. Stuffed toys in the form of a rabbit called Järnkaninen (lit. 'Iron Rabbit') are sold, the name a pun on the word Järnkamin.

=== Club beers ===
A couple of beers have been created over the years. At present, Alberget 4A is sold for Djurgårdens IF. It is named for the address of the café where the club was founded. The beer was launched in 2013 and is sold through Djurgårdshjälpen, a supporter initiative to raise money for the sports club. Originally, the beer was called Alltid oavsett ("always, no matter what"), which is a slogan often used by supporters of Djurgårdens IF. The beer is a pale lager of 5.0% abv made by Grebbestad Bryggeri on behalf of Djurgårdshjälpen and is not part of Grebbestad Bryggeri's own range of beers.

=== Famous Djurgården supporters ===
- His Majesty Carl XVI Gustaf, King of Sweden
- Fredrik Reinfeldt, former Prime Minister of Sweden
- Olof Palme, former Prime Minister of Sweden
- Lars Ohly, former party leader of Vänsterpartiet
- Joakim Thåström, musician
- Stefan Persson, former CEO of H&M
- Christer Fuglesang, astronaut, first Scandinavian in space
- Magnus Uggla, musician

== People ==
=== Hall of fame ===
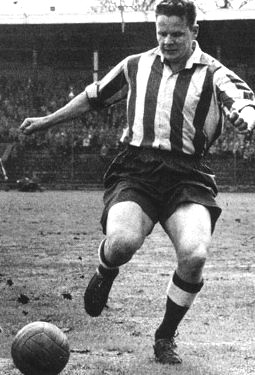
Gösta Sandberg in 1964

Starting in 2021, Djurgårdens IF are inducting sportspeople and personnel into a hall of fame. 52 people have been included:

- Karl-Erik Andersson
- Hans Andersson-Tvilling
- Stig Andersson-Tvilling
- Wilhelm Arwe
- Sigvard Bergh
- Pelle Bergström
- Oscar Bernadotte
- Lasse Björn
- Oscar Bomgren
- Anna Dettner
- Britt Elfving
- Carl-Erik Eriksson
- Carl von Essen
- Göran Flodström
- Kathinka Frisk
- Inga Gentzel
- Arne Grunander
- Karl Gustafsson
- Olle Hellström
- Leif Högström
- Hans Jacobson
- John G. Jansson
- Hasse Jeppson
- Gösta Johansson
- Markus Karlsson
- Sven Lindman
- Bo Lundquist
- Gunnar Lundqvist
- Hans Mild
- Ebba Myrberg
- Bertil Nordenskjöld
- Axel Norling
- Gustaf Nyman
- Axel Öfverstén
- Einar Olsson
- Nils Ramm
- Stefan Rehn
- Béla Rerrich
- Birger Sandberg
- Gösta Sandberg
- Inga Söderbaum
- Håkan Södergren
- Gustaf Söderström
- Karl Gustaf Staaf
- Roland Stoltz
- Gottfrid Svensson
- Olle Tandberg
- Elisabeth Thorsson
- Sven Tumba
- Edvin Vesterby

=== Chairpeople ===
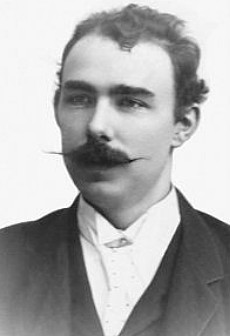
John G. Jansson, Djurgårdens IF's first chairman

- John G. Jansson (1891–92)
- O. Rylander (1893)
- John G. Jansson (1894–95)
- Johan Arkadius Dahlin (1896)
- John G. Jansson (1897)
- Herman Johansson (1898)
- K. Moberg (1899)
- Gustaf Herman Andersson (1900–06)
- Carl Hellberg (1906–25)
- N. A. Hedjerson (1925–28)
- Bertil Nordenskjöld (1928–1942)
- Sven Larson (1942–53)
- Åke Dunér (1953–61)
- Hugo Caneman (1962–66)
- Carl-Hjalmar Bodman (1967–74)
- Rudolf Walldén (1975–78)
- Gustaf Douglas (1979)
- Rudolf Walldén (1980–81)
- Bengt Broberg (1982–83)
- Berth Sundin (1984–86)
- Jan-Peder Norstedt (1987–90)

- Arne Gustafsson (1991)
- Per Darnell (2001–09)
- Lars Erbom (2012–18)
- Andreas von der Heide (2019–present)

== Organisations in close cooperation ==
The following non-profit organisations are independent but has a close official cooperation with Djurgårdens IF:

- DIF Supporters Club (stipends for young and promising athletes etc.)
- Sällskapet Gamla Djurgårdare
- Djurgårdsandan (club values)
- DIF-arkivet (maintaining club history)
