= Jönköpings idrottshus =

Sports hall in Jönköping, Sweden

Coordinates: 57.7814°N 14.1536°E

- Kåken
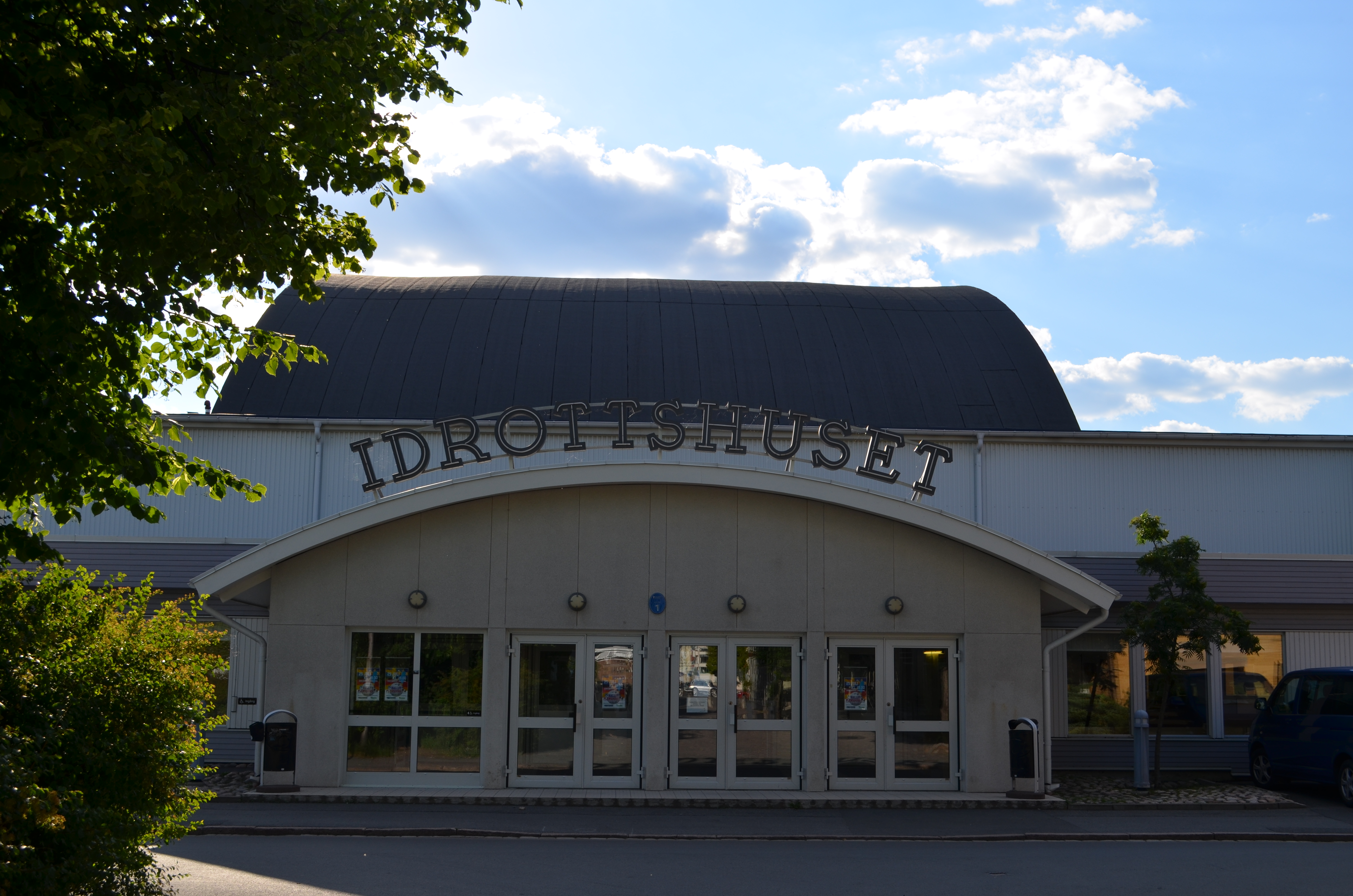
- Jönköpings idrottshus in June 2011
- Interactive map of Jönköpings idrottshus
- Location: Jönköping, Sweden
- Owner: Jönköping Municipality
- Type: sports hall

Construction
- Opened: 19 November 1939

Tenants
- Jönköping City IBK; IK Cyrus T/S; IF Hallby; Jönköpings IK; KFUM Jönköping

Jönköpings idrottshus, nicknamed Kåken, is a sports hall in Väster in Jönköping, Sweden. It was opened on 19 November 1939 with a handball game between GoIF Fram and IFK Kristianstad and acts as home ground for club teams like Jönköping City IBK (floorball), IK Cyrus T/S, IF Hallby (handball), Jönköpings IK (floorball) and KFUM Jönköping.

Following criticism for being "too old" by the early 2000s, it was renovated and reopened on 8 September 2012.
