= KFUM =

KFUM is the Scandinavian translation of YMCA. It may also refer to:

== Sports ==
- Fuglebakken KFUM Århus, football club from Aarhus, Denmark
- KFUM Borås, multi-sport club from Borås, Sweden
- KFUM Jönköping, sports club from Jönköping, Sweden
- KFUM Nässjö, basketball club from Nässjö, Sweden
- KFUM Örebro, sports club from Örebro, Sweden
- KFUM Roskilde, football club from Roskilde, Denmark
- KFUMs Boldklub København, sports club from Copenhagen, Denmark
- KFUM-Kameratene Oslo, sports club from Oslo, Norway
- Silkeborg KFUM, football club from Silkeborg, Denmark
- Silkeborg-Voel KFUM, handball club from Silkeborg, Denmark

=== Stadiums ===
- KFUM Arena, football stadium in Oslo, Norway

== See also ==
- (the Scandinavian translation of YWCA)
