= Djurgårdens IF Amerikansk Fotboll =

American football club in Sweden

- Location: Stockholm
- Arena: Östermalms IP

Djurgårdens IF Amerikansk Fotboll is the section for American football within the sports club Djurgårdens IF in Stockholm. The American football club was founded in 2005.

In 2009 and 2010, Djurgården played in Superserien, the top-tier for American football in Sweden, but the club had to withdraw after that. The team was restarted for the 2013 season, in a lower division in the series system.
