= Jönköpings IK =

Floorball club in Jönköping, Sweden

- Full name: Jönköpings innebandyklubb
- Short name: JIK
- Founded: 9 March 1985
- Arena: Jönköpings idrottshus
- Capacity: 1,500
- Coach: Emil Stille
- Captain: Joel Nyström
- League: (Sweden) SSL
Home colors	Away colors

Jönköpings IK is a floorball club in Jönköping, Sweden, established on 9 March 1985 following a merger of the SMU Immanuel Church and the Munksjö School teams. The men's team has played several seasons in the Swedish top division and lost the Swedish national finals in 1986, 1988, and 1990 while earning the national championship bronze medals in 1987, 1989, and 1991.

== Roster ==
As of December 11, 2024

#	Nat.	Player	Pos.	Grip	Age	Acquired	Birthplace
1	(Sweden)	Emil Ödman	G		23
33	(Switzerland)	Alessio Mura	G		21
5	(Sweden)	Filip Åkerblom	D	L	28
6	(Sweden)	Joel Nyström	D		25
7	(Sweden)	Elliot Johansson	D		18
17	(Sweden)	Anton Svanberg	D	R	22
26	(Sweden)	Emrick Wiggur	D	L	25
32	(Czech Republic)	Martin Čermák	D	R	23
66	(Sweden)	Hannes Nyström	D	L	22
89	(Sweden)	Albin Jakobsson	D	L	26
8	(Sweden)	Anton Gröön	F		24
9	(Sweden)	Walter Dahlström	F		20
10	(Sweden)	Eddie Swärdh	F		20
11	(Sweden)	Isac Holmer	F		20
13	(Sweden)	Oscar Rohlin	F		28
15	(Sweden)	Oliver Staiger	F		20
16	(Sweden)	Ludvig Dahlin	F		21
19	(Sweden)	Filip Lindrud	F		20
23	(Sweden)	Alexander Lind	F		24
27	(Czech Republic)	Filip Smutný	F	R	20
59	(Sweden)	Simon Hult	F	L	22
65	(Sweden)	Jacob Jensen	F		20
81	(Sweden)	Emil Jacobsson	F	L	23
99	(Sweden)	Noah Johansson	F	L	23
