= GoIF Fram =

Swedish sports club

- Full name: Gymnastik- och idrottsföreningen Fram
- Sport: bowling handball (earlier)
- Founded: 1921
- Based in: Jönköping, Sweden
- Arena: Bowling City (bowling); Jönköpings idrottshus (handball)

GoIF Fram is a sports club in Jönköping, Sweden, established in 1921. It played in the Swedish men's handball top division during the 1939-1940 season, but later became more focused on bowling, establishing a section on 1 April 1960.
