= Grebbestad Bryggeri =

Brewery in Sweden

- Type: Brewery
- Location: Grebbestad, Sweden

Active beers
Koster and Granit
Name	Type

Seasonal beers
Christmas beer
Name	Type

Grebbestad Bryggeri is a brewery in the town Grebbestad on the Swedish west coast. It is a relatively small and local brewery producing their products mainly for the use of the local county Bohuslän. Their main products are two lager beers called Koster and Granit, but other brews occur as well.

== Products ==
Koster is a lager beer with 3.5% alcohol and is available for purchase mostly in local supermarkets. The name comes from the local islands of Koster.

Granit (Swedish for Granite) is a lager beer . It is sold in local supermarkets at 3.5% alcohol and at 4.8% at Systembolaget. The name is inspired by the cliffs of Bohuslän, where Grebbestad lies, which are made of granite. For Christmas a special Christmas beer is made, following Swedish brewer traditions. The beer is like most other Swedish Christmas brews, a porter-like dark lager.

== Beers produced for others ==
Grebbestad produces some beers on behalf of the Gothenburg brewery Göteborgs Nya Bryggeri.

Grebbestad also produces the beer Alberget 4A on behalf of Djurgårdshjälpen. This beer is not part of the Grebbestad brand but is sold to support the sports club Djurgårdens IF.
