= IF Hallby =

Sports club in Jönköping, Sweden

- Full name: Idrottsföreningen Hallby
- Sport: cycle sport, handball, cross-country skiing, orienteering, ski orienteering, soccer, track and field athletics bandy, figure skating, speed skating (earlier)
- Founded: 7 April 1929
- Based in: Jönköping, Sweden
- Arena: Jönköpings idrottshus
- Ballpark: Bymarksvallen

IF Hallby is a sports club in Jönköping, Sweden, established on 7 April 1929. It originally ran cross-country skiing, soccer, track and field athletics and ice skating, and the club won the 1932 speed skating district team championship. Handball was adopted in 1933 and orienteering in 1934. On 1 June 2001, the club became an alliance club.

The men's handball team has played four seasons in the Swedish top division and the women's handball team has played in the Swedish top division for two seasons.

The men's soccer team played 19 seasons in Division III, back then the Swedish third division, between 1943 and 1983.

An important gathering-place for the club is Hallbystugan, which is located in a popular outdoor recreation area, near Axamo.

== Handball ==
IF Hallby
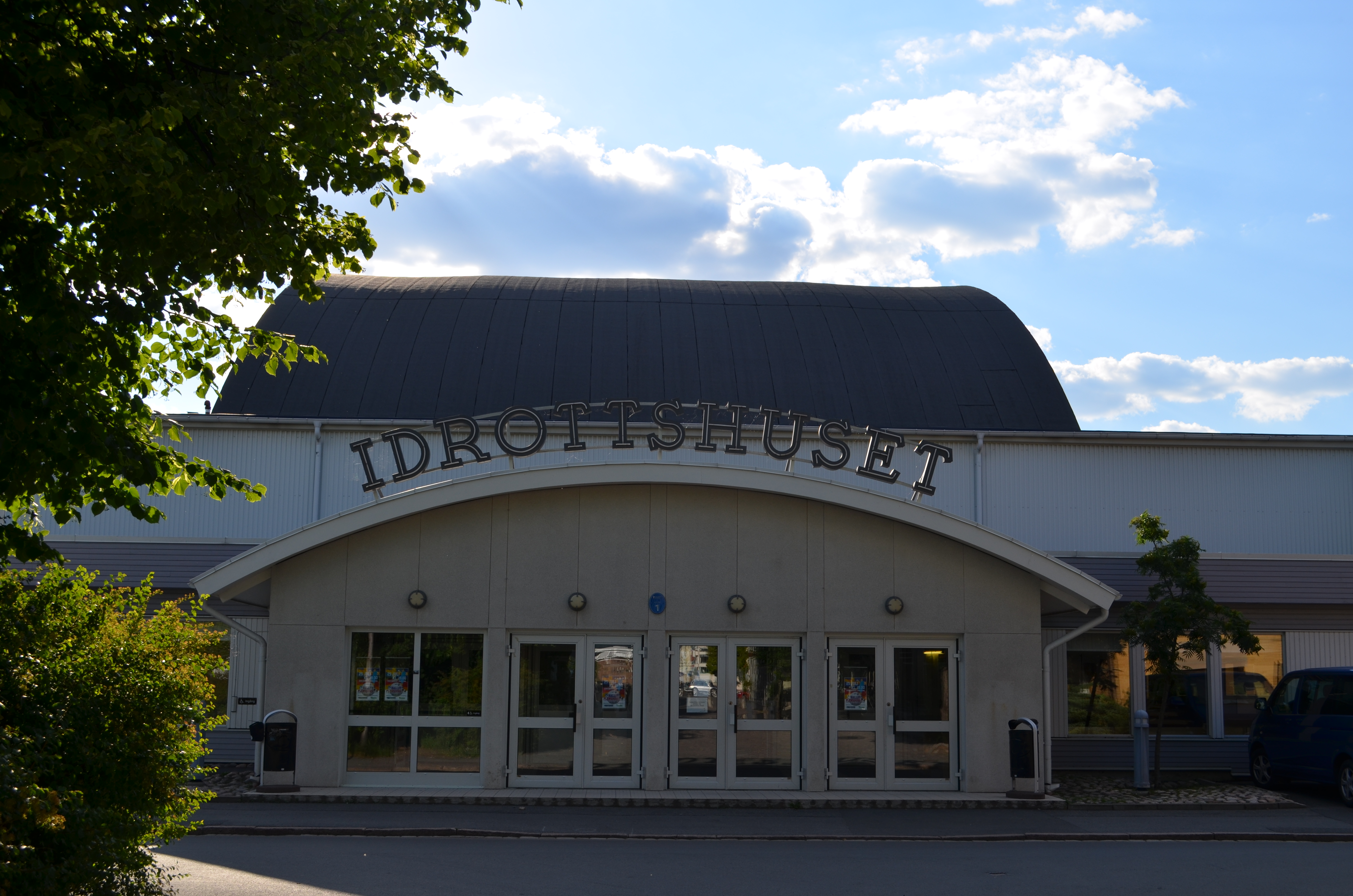
- Jönköpings idrottshus
- Full name: Idrottsföreningen Hallby Handboll
- Founded: 1933
- League: Handbollsligan
- Home ground: Jönköpings idrottshus, Jönköping
- Manager: Anders Hallberg
- 2021-22: 10th
- Website: http://www.hallbyhandboll.se

The club currently competes in Handbollsligan, the top domestic handball league.

=== Sports Hall information ===
- Name: – Jönköpings idrottshus
- City: – Jönköping
- Capacity: – 1500
- Address: – Lagermansgatan 4, 553 18 Jönköping, Sweden

=== Kits ===
HOME

AWAY

== Team ==
=== Current squad ===
Squad for the 2025–26 season

Goalkeepers
Left Wingers
Right Wingers
Line players

- (Sweden) Rasmus Thomsen

Left Backs
Central Backs
Right Backs

- (Chile) (Sweden) Joshua Mesias Västerlund

=== Transfers ===
Transfers for the 2026–27 season

Joining

Leaving

- (Sweden) Albin Broman (RB) to (Norway) ØIF Arendal
- (Sweden) Robert Ladan (LW) to (Sweden) Anderstorps SK

=== Transfer History ===
Transfers for the 2025–26 season

Joining

- (Chile) (Sweden) Joshua Mesias Västerlund (RB) from (Sweden) IFK Karlskrona
- (Sweden) Rasmus Thomsen (LP) from (Sweden) Önnereds HK

Leaving

- (Sweden) Oscar Ader (LW) to (Sweden) Amo Handboll
