= Järnkaminerna =

Supporter group of Swedish sports club Djurgårdens IF

Logo of the supporter club

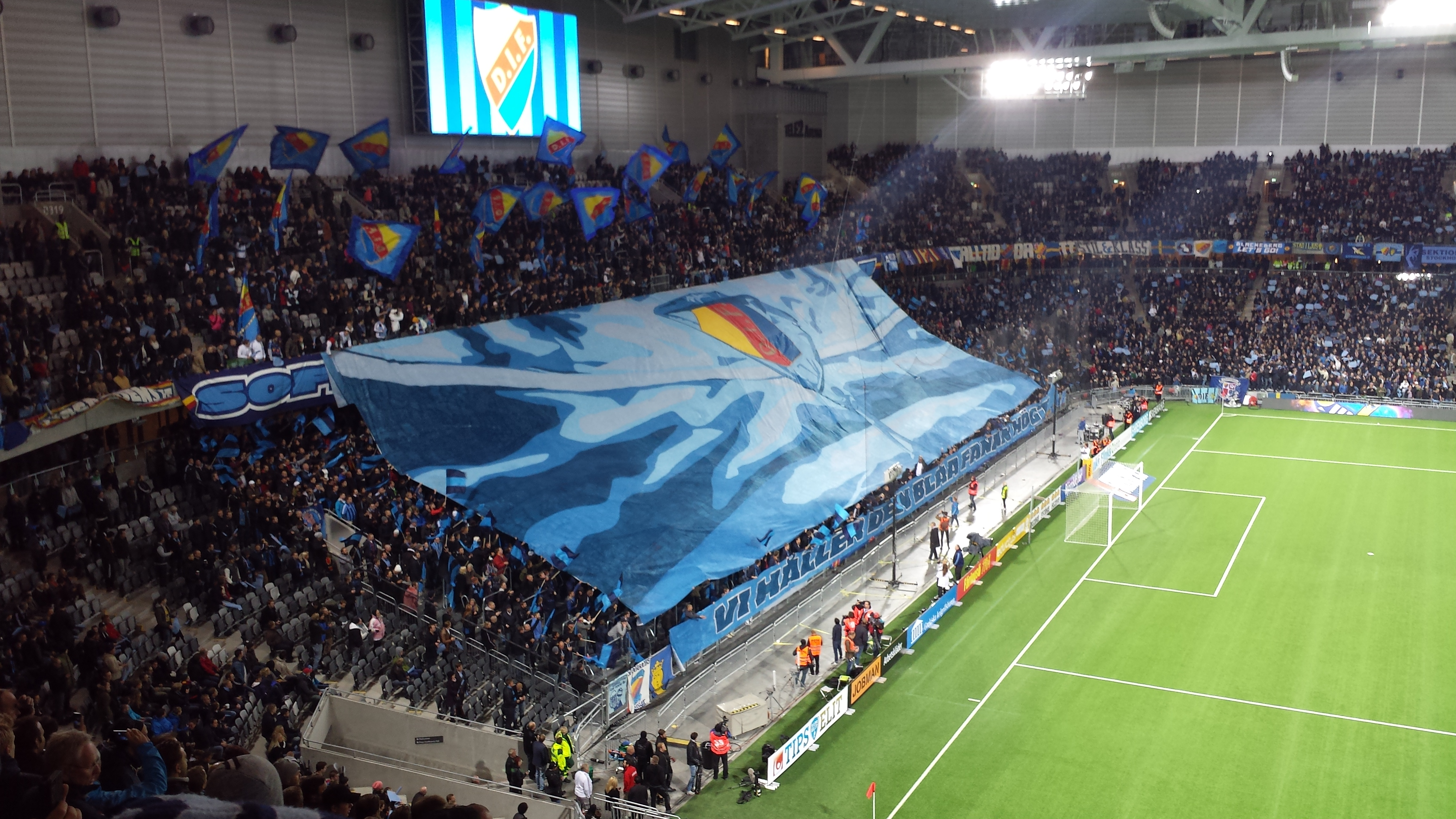
Supporter stand at Tele2 Arena

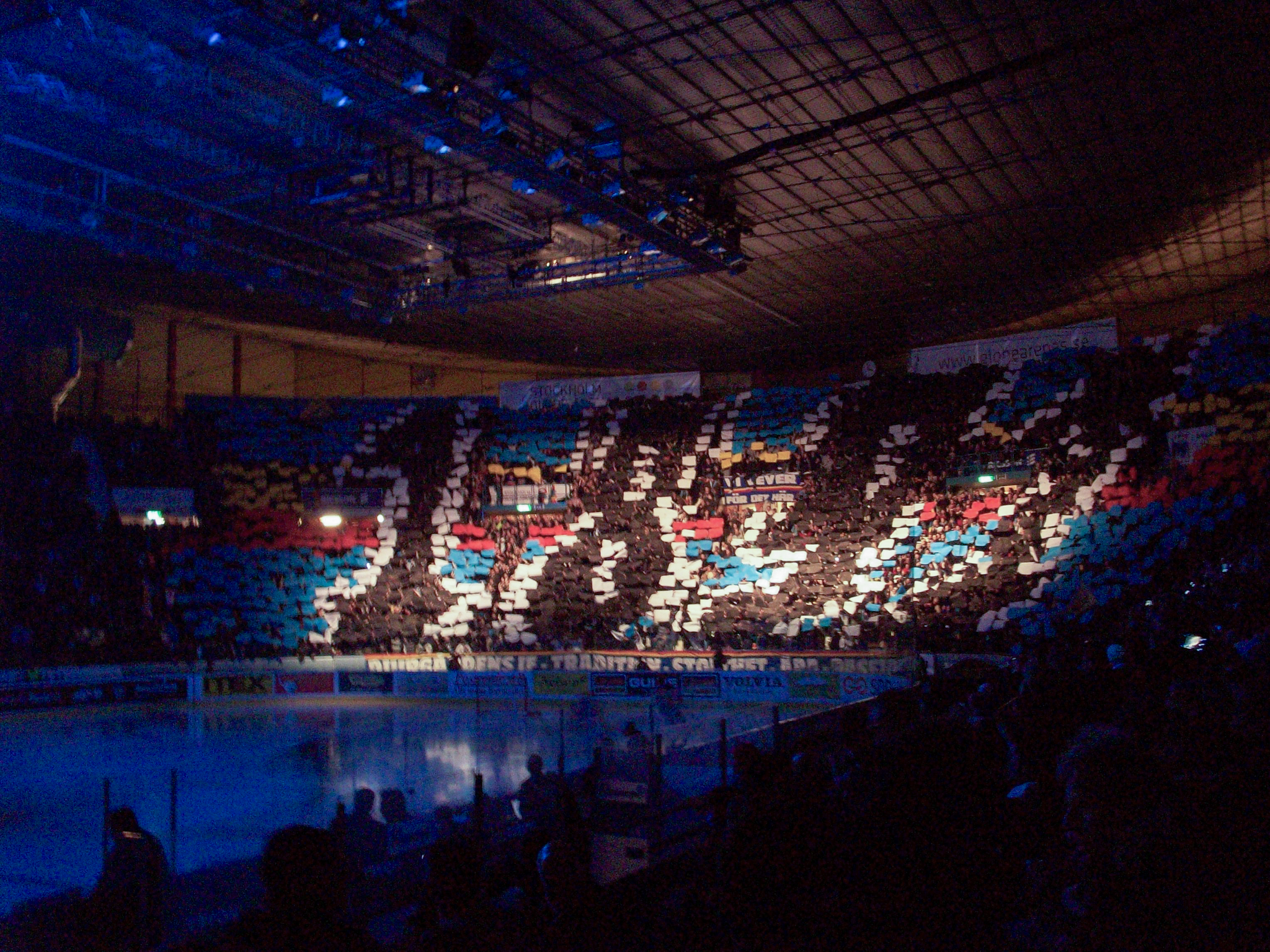
Supporter stand at Hovet

Järnkaminerna (lit. The Iron Stoves) is the largest official supporter club of the sports club Djurgårdens IF. Järnkaminerna is also a nickname for the sports club itself.

A common shortened form of the supporters club Järnkaminerna is JK.

== History ==
The nickname derives from the 1950s when Djurgårdens IF's football division was renowned for their physique and physical training as well as their rough style of play on the pitch. The stripes of the Djurgården jersey, particularly the away colors of blue and dark red, looked somewhat similar to an old-style iron stove, the blue being the iron slats and the red the glow of the fire. After this period the team became commonly known as "Järnkaminerna" (The Iron Stoves). The nickname has remained arguably the most popular nickname for Djurgårdens IF, its players and supporters, together with "the blue stripes", until today.

During the 1970s younger supporters organized themselves and in 1981 they formed "Blue Saints", although the first supporters club of Djurgården was DIF Supporters Club, established in 1947. Due to bad publicity, after numerous violent clashes, "Blue Saints" reformed, and in 1997 adopted the name "Järnkaminerna" and undertook an effort to whitewash the supporters club's name. Today "Järnkaminerna" are one of Sweden's largest supporters clubs in numbers, and smaller sections are today established outside of Stockholm.
