= 1939–40 Allsvenskan (men's handball) =

Swedish handball season

Allsvenskan
- 1939–40

Tournament information
- Sport: Handball
- Teams: 7

Final positions
- Champions: Majornas IK

The 1939–40 Allsvenskan was the sixth season of the top division of Swedish handball. Seven teams competed in the league. Majornas IK won the league, but the title of Swedish Champions was awarded to the winner of Svenska mästerskapet. GoIF Fram were relegated.

== League table ==
Pos	Team	Pld	W	D	L	GF	GA	GD	Pts
1	Majornas IK	12	8	0	4	126	87	39	16
2	IFK Kristianstad	12	8	0	4	106	88	18	16
3	IFK Karlskrona	12	7	1	4	84	71	13	15
4	Redbergslids IK	12	6	0	6	103	82	21	12
5	Djurgårdens IF	12	6	0	6	107	92	15	12
6	Upsala IF	12	7	1	6	84	84	0	11
7	GoIF Fram	12	1	0	11	46	152	−106	2

== Attendance ==
All teams did not play the same number of home matches since Upsala Studenters IF withdrew during the season.

Team	Home matches	Attendance
Majornas IK	6	3135
Redbergslids IK	7	2279
Djurgårdens IF	6	1543
IFK Kristianstad	6	1233
IFK Karlskrona	6	1162
Upsala Studenters IF	3	643
GoIF Fram	7	622
Upsala IF	7	435
