= Sigvard Bergh =

Swedish footballer (1912–1994)

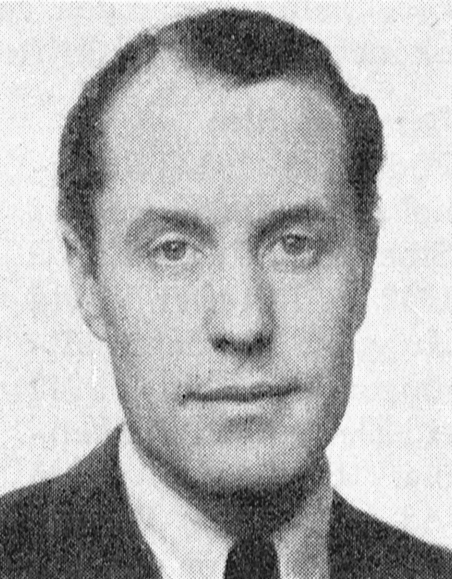

Personal information
- Date of birth: 17 August 1912
- Date of death: 1994
- Position: Forward

Senior career*
Years	Team	Apps	(Gls)
- Långshyttans AIK
1932–	Djurgården		
- * Club domestic league appearances and goals

Sigvard Bergh (17 August 1912 – 1994) was a Swedish footballer who played as a forward. He made 16 Allsvenskan appearances for Djurgården and scored 1 goal.
