= Hjorthagens IP =

Sports ground in Hjorthagen, Stockholm, Sweden

- Hjortis
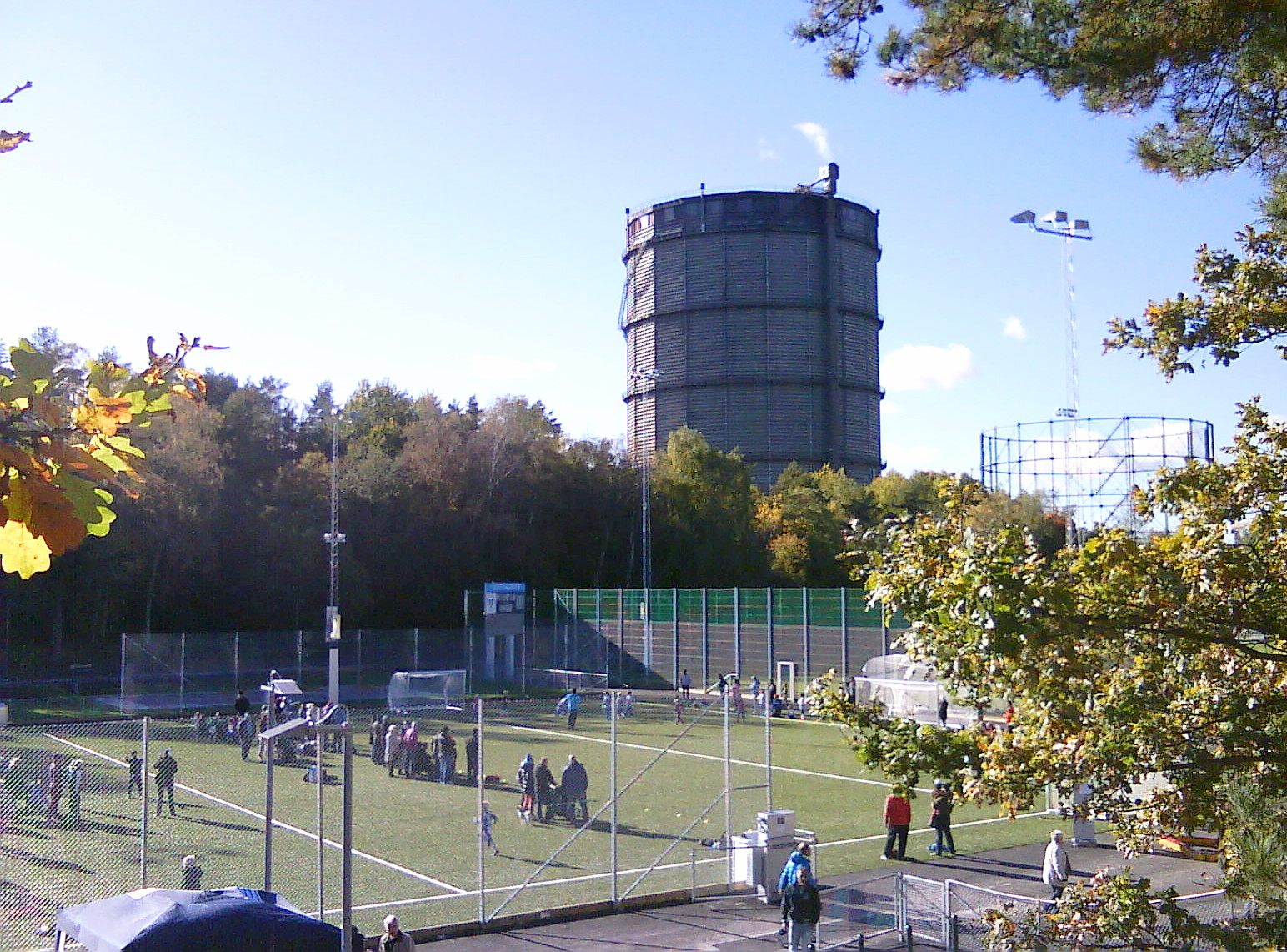
- Hjorthagens IP in October 2012
- Interactive map of Hjorthagens IP
- Full name: Hjorthagens idrottsplats
- Location: Stockholm, Sweden
- Coordinates: 59°21′22″N 18°05′40″E
- Owner: Stockholm Municipality
- Type: sports ground

Tenants
- Djurgårdens IF FF, Djurgårdens IF Handikappfotbollförening, Värtans IK

Hjorthagens IP is a sports ground in Stockholm, Sweden. It has been used by Djurgårdens IF FF as practice ground; by the Djurgårdens IF handicap football association; and by Värtans IK. In winter it serves as an ice skating rink.

On 6 October 2012 three soccer fields using artificial turf were opened.
