= Gösta Dahlberg =

Swedish footballer

Senior career*
Years	Team	Apps	(Gls)
- Djurgården
- * Club domestic league appearances and goals

Gösta Dahlberg is a Swedish retired footballer. Dahlberg was part of the Djurgården Swedish champions' team of 1912.

== Honours ==
=== Club ===
Djurgårdens IF

- Svenska Mästerskapet: 1912
