= KFUM Jönköping =

KFUM Jönköping is an YMCA association in Jönköping in Sweden, established in 1855. By the late 1980s and early 1990s the volleyboll team experienced a successful period, playing in Elitserien at both the men's and women's sides.
