= MT Melsungen =

German handball club

- Full name: Melsunger Turngemeinde 1861 e. V.
- Nickname: Bartenwetzer
- Short name: MTM
- Founded: 1861; 165 years ago
- Arena: Rothenbach-Halle
- Capacity: 4,500
- Head coach: Roberto García Parrondo
- League: Handball-Bundesliga
- 2025–26: 7th of 18
- Club colours
Home	Away

Location of MT Melsungen

MT Melsungen is a German professional handball club based in Melsungen, Hesse. The club's men's first team competes in the Handball-Bundesliga, the highest level of men's handball in Germany. The team plays its home matches at the Rothenbach-Halle in Kassel, although from the 2027–28 season it is scheduled to move to the Probonio Arena.

The club was founded in 1861 as Melsunger Turngemeinde. Its handball department was established in 1921. The first men's team reached the 2. Handball-Bundesliga in 1992 and the Bundesliga in 2005, where it has remained continuously since the 2005–06 season.

In 2026, MT Melsungen won the EHF European League for the first time, defeating THW Kiel 24–23 in the final in Hamburg. It was the first major title in the club's history, either domestically or internationally. The victory qualified Melsungen for the EHF Champions League for the first time in 2026–27.

== History ==
=== Foundation and early years ===
MT Melsungen was founded in 1861 as Melsunger Turngemeinde by 38 citizens of Melsungen. The club's handball department was established in 1921.

The handball team initially competed at local level. In the mid-1970s, the first men's team was still playing in the Kreisliga. Under the leadership of Herbert Rausch, the club began a sustained sporting development, bringing talented players from the region as well as more experienced players and coaches to Melsungen. In the mid-1980s, Melsungen won the Bezirksmeisterschaft and was promoted to the Oberliga.

In 1987, Melsungen won the Hessenmeisterschaft and was promoted to the Regionalliga Südwest. The team remained in the Regionalliga for five seasons from 1987 to 1992, competing in the northern division of the Regionalliga Südwest. Melsungen finished first in its division in both 1990–91 and 1991–92, establishing itself as one of the leading teams in the region.

=== Promotion to the second division ===
After finishing first in their Regionalliga Südwest division, Melsungen entered the promotion play-offs for the 2. Handball-Bundesliga in 1991. In the first leg against TuS 04 Kaiserslautern-Dansenberg, Melsungen lost 18–24 away, before winning the return leg 18–17 at home. As the aggregate score was still insufficient to decide the tie in Melsungen's favour, a third and decisive match was played at a neutral venue in Hüttenberg. Melsungen narrowly lost the deciding match 26–27, with a late turnover allowing Dansenberg to score the decisive counter-attack.

The defeat meant that Melsungen remained in the Regionalliga for another season. In 1992, the club secured promotion to the 2. Handball-Bundesliga by defeating TV Nieder-Olm 24–22 in the decisive promotion match in Nieder-Olm.

The promotion established Melsungen at national level and marked the beginning of a 13-year period in the second division. During its first years in the 2. Handball-Bundesliga, Melsungen initially had to establish itself in the reorganised league structure. The team finished 11th in its first season and subsequently improved its position, reaching fifth place in 1995–96. Melsungen's sporting development became particularly evident in the second half of the 1990s. The team finished third in the southern division in 1997–98, its best league position at that point. In 1999, the handball department entered into a playing partnership with TSV Eintracht Böddiger, competing as MSG Melsungen/Böddiger. The partnership continued until the club's promotion to the Bundesliga in 2005.

==== 1996 DHB-Pokal run ====
Melsungen reached the DHB-Pokal Final Four for the first time in the 1995–96 season. As a second-division club, the team eliminated three Bundesliga opponents in succession, defeating TuS Nettelstedt 28–23, GWD Minden 34–33 after extra time, and OSC Rheinhausen 24–23 to qualify for the Final Four in Hamburg In the semi-final on 30 April 1996, Melsungen lost 17–22 to TUSEM Essen. Around 1,000 supporters travelled from North Hesse to Hamburg for the tournament, marking one of the largest away followings in the club's history at the time.

=== Promotion to the Bundesliga ===
The MSG Melsungen/Böddiger established itself among the leading teams in the southern second division during the early 2000s. After finishing third in 2003–04, the team won the 2004–05 2. Bundesliga Süd title and secured promotion to the Handball-Bundesliga for the first time. The promotion was closely associated with coach Rastislav Trtík, who had taken charge of Melsungen in 2004. Trtík introduced an unusually offensive style of play and a 4:2 defensive formation with two advanced defenders. The system required considerable running and discipline from the Melsungen players and created problems for opposing teams, as the unusual defensive structure was difficult to adapt to. According to former Melsungen player Daniel Holl, Trtík's tactical concept was based on producing 70 to 80 attacks per match. His approach helped transform the team into one of the most successful sides in the second division during the 2004–05 season.

Under Trtík, Melsungen won 29 of 34 league matches in the 2004–05 season and finished first in the southern division, securing promotion to the Bundesliga. The team had already clinched promotion before the final matchday with the 34–24 victory over HBW Balingen-Weilstetten on 7 May 2005. The promotion marked the end of Melsungen's 13-year spell in the second division. From the 2005–06 season onwards, the club competed continuously in the Bundesliga under the name MT Melsungen.

Melsunger TG	→	MSG Melsungen/Böddiger	→	MT Melsungen
Until 1999		1999–2005		Since 2005

=== Move to Kassel ===
Following promotion to the Bundesliga in 2005, Melsungen initially played its home matches at the Meirotels-Halle in Rotenburg an der Fulda. The Stadtsporthalle in Melsungen was too small for Bundesliga requirements, while the Meirotels-Halle, with a capacity of around 2,400 spectators, provided a larger venue and the infrastructure required for top-level handball. Melsungen played its first two Bundesliga seasons in Rotenburg, where the club also used shuttle buses to transport supporters from Melsungen to home matches.

The club subsequently sought a larger and more centrally located venue in the North Hesse region. The idea of moving to Kassel was promoted by head coach Robert Hedin, who saw the city's newly built Rothenbach-Halle on the Messe Kassel grounds as a suitable long-term home for Bundesliga handball.

Melsungen moved to the Rothenbach-Halle in December 2007. The final Bundesliga home match in Rotenburg was played on 22 December 2007, before the club made its debut in the new venue on 26 December against THW Kiel. The inaugural match was played in front of a sold-out crowd of around 4,300 spectators, although Melsungen lost 31–36.

The move established Kassel as the club's principal home venue while Melsungen retained its historic name and identity. The Rothenbach-Halle subsequently remained the MT's home venue for two decades. The club also continued to use venues in Melsungen for selected cup matches, including matches during its runs to the DHB-Pokal Final Four in 2013 and 2014.

In May 2025, Melsungen temporarily moved two Bundesliga home matches to the Probonio Arena in Kassel because the Rothenbach-Halle was unavailable due to a trade fair. Both matches were won by Melsungen. The successful games provided the club with an additional experience of the arena before its planned permanent move.

The agreement between Melsungen and Messe Kassel for the Rothenbach-Halle expires in June 2027. From the 2027–28 season, Melsungen is scheduled to play its home matches at the Probonio Arena in Kassel. The new agreement initially runs for five years. The arena is planned to have a capacity of around 6,200 spectators for MT home matches following redevelopment, providing a larger venue and expanded commercial and hospitality facilities.

=== Establishment in the Bundesliga ===
Following promotion in 2005, Melsungen's primary objective was to establish itself in the Bundesliga. The club initially achieved this in terms of maintaining its place in the top division, but made little progress in the standings. Melsungen finished 12th in both the 2005–06 and 2006–07 seasons and improved to 10th in 2007–08. The following season saw the team finish 11th, before dropping back to 12th in 2009–10. Thus, while Melsungen had established itself as a permanent member of the Bundesliga, its sporting development largely stagnated in the middle and lower half of the table during its first years in the top division.

The period was also characterised by several changes on the coaching bench. Swedish coach Robert Hedin took over in January 2007 and remained in charge until the end of the 2008–09 season. During his tenure, Melsungen recorded its highest finish to that point with tenth place in 2007–08, followed by eleventh place in 2008–09. Hedin was succeeded by Danish coach Ryan Zinglersen for the 2009–10 season, but the team was unable to build on its improved league position from the previous year and finished 12th.

For the 2010–11 season, Slovenian coach Matjaž Tominec replaced Zinglersen. The season began poorly, with Melsungen failing to earn a point from its opening four matches. After further defeats, Tominec was relieved of his duties in October 2010. Assistant coach Sándor Balogh initially took over on an interim basis, before Michael Roth was appointed as the new head coach. Roth's arrival brought an end to Melsungen's first phase of consolidation in the Bundesliga and marked the beginning of a new period in the club's sporting development.

=== The Michael Roth era ===
In October 2010, Michael Roth took over as head coach of Melsungen, replacing Matjaž Tominec. Roth joined the club after Melsungen had lost its first seven Bundesliga matches of the 2010–11 season and stood at 0:14 points. He remained in charge until April 2018, becoming the longest-serving head coach at Melsungen since the club's promotion to the 2. Bundesliga in 1992.

Roth initially stabilised the team in the Bundesliga. Melsungen finished 13th in 2010–11, followed by 10th-place finishes in both 2011–12 and 2012–13. The club's sporting development accelerated during the following seasons, with Melsungen finishing sixth in both 2013–14 and 2014–15 before reaching fourth place in 2015–16, its best Bundesliga finish at the time.

The 2012–13 season also saw Melsungen return to the Final Four of the DHB-Pokal for the first time since 1996. In the semi-final on 13 April 2013, Melsungen faced defending champions THW Kiel. The North Hessian side initially led 10–8, but Kiel turned the match around and eventually won 35–23 (16–14).

Melsungen returned to the Final Four in 2014, again reaching the semi-final. On 12 April, the team faced Füchse Berlin in Hamburg. Berlin led 15–13 at half-time and ultimately prevailed 30–28.

The 2014–15 season marked another milestone, as Melsungen qualified for European competition for the first time in the club's history. The team entered the EHF Cup and progressed through two qualification rounds before reaching the group phase. Melsungen subsequently reached the quarter-finals, establishing itself as a regular participant in European competition.

In the quarter-finals, Melsungen faced Danish club Skjern Håndbold. Skjern won the first leg 25–20 in Denmark, but Melsungen won the return leg 28–23 at home. The aggregate score was 48–48, with Skjern advancing on the away-goals rule. The tie represented Melsungen's first appearance in the quarter-finals of a European club competition.

The 2015–16 season became the sporting peak of the Roth era in the Bundesliga. Melsungen finished fourth with 47 points, the best league position in the club's history at the time, and qualified for another season of European competition.

Melsungen returned to the EHF Cup in 2016–17. After defeating Croatian club RK Zamet in the qualification round, the team advanced from the group phase to the quarter-finals. There, Melsungen faced French club Saint-Raphaël Var Handball. Saint-Raphaël won the first leg 30–26 and the return leg 31–23, eliminating Melsungen 61–49 on aggregate.

Melsungen finished seventh in the Bundesliga in 2016–17 and seventh again in 2017–18. Despite the club's progress during Roth's tenure, the 2017–18 season was marked by inconsistent performances. The team had been reinforced with several prominent players, but the club's management concluded that the squad was no longer developing sufficiently despite the investments made.

On 6 April 2018, Melsungen parted ways with Roth with immediate effect, bringing his almost eight-year tenure to an early end. Roth still had a contract with the club until June 2020. The club's management stated that, in its assessment, Roth had been unable to further develop the team sufficiently despite several high-profile reinforcements. The decision was also made against the background of the club's increased expectations and the team's inconsistent performances during the season.

When Heiko Grimm joined Melsungen as an assistant coach in January 2018, the club had initially planned a transition in which Roth would remain head coach. Grimm had previously coached HC Kriens-Luzern in Switzerland and was appointed to strengthen the coaching staff and contribute to the further development of the team.

Following Roth's dismissal, Grimm was promoted from assistant coach to head coach with immediate effect. His appointment marked the beginning of a transition period for Melsungen. Roth's tenure had lasted almost eight years, during which the club reached the DHB-Pokal Final Four twice, reached the EHF Cup quarter-finals twice and achieved its highest Bundesliga finish to that point with fourth place in 2015–16.

==== Post-Roth development ====
Grimm remained in charge at the beginning of the 2019–20 season. Although Melsungen had qualified for European competition and reached the group phase of the EHF Cup, the team's performances in the Bundesliga became increasingly inconsistent. In February 2020, the club's management placed Grimm and the players under a three-match ultimatum after a series of disappointing performances. Manager Axel Geerken stated that the team had failed to produce a consistent level of performance and had repeatedly suffered unexplained setbacks after strong periods. The club considered this inconsistent form to be below the level expected from a squad with Melsungen's potential.

The first match of the ultimatum, away against Eulen Ludwigshafen, ended in a 25–25 draw. Melsungen therefore remained without a victory, and on 25 February 2020 the club dismissed Grimm before the three-match ultimatum had expired. The club stated that the team's performances had not improved sufficiently and that the sporting development did not meet expectations.

Grimm's dismissal came less than two years after he had succeeded Roth and ended his tenure after around 22 months. One day after his dismissal, Melsungen appointed Icelandic coach Gudmundur Guðmundsson as his successor, initially on a contract until the end of the season.

Guðmundsson took over during the 2019–20 season, which was subsequently heavily affected by the COVID-19 pandemic. The Bundesliga season was suspended and eventually ended after 27 matchdays, with Melsungen finishing seventh. The club retained Guðmundsson for the following season.

The 2020–21 season ended with Melsungen finishing eighth in the Bundesliga. The club entered the following season with the expectation of further sporting development, but the partnership with Guðmundsson was also short-lived. After the first three Bundesliga matches of the 2021–22 season, Melsungen had collected one draw and two defeats and stood at 1:5 points.

On 20 September 2021, Melsungen relieved Guðmundsson of his duties. The club stated that the hoped-for development of the team had failed to materialise and that the coach and team had not developed the desired connection. Assistant coach Arjan Haenen temporarily took charge of the team while the club searched for a successor.

Guðmundsson's tenure therefore ended after around 19 months. Just over a week after his departure, Melsungen appointed Spanish coach Roberto García Parrondo as his successor, marking the beginning of a new phase in the club's sporting development.

=== The Roberto García Parrondo era ===
Roberto García Parrondo arrived at a club that had established itself as a permanent Bundesliga side but had struggled to compete consistently for the top positions. His first two seasons were marked by a gradual rebuilding of the team, with Melsungen finishing eighth in 2021–22 and ninth in 2022–23.

The 2023–24 season marked the first major improvement under Parrondo. Melsungen finished fifth in the Bundesliga and reached the DHB-Pokal final, where it lost 19–30 to SC Magdeburg. The result secured Melsungen's return to European competition for the following season.

The improvement continued into the following season, when Melsungen established itself among the leading teams in German handball. The club's return to European competition and its performances in the Bundesliga marked the beginning of a sustained period of success under Parrondo.

==== 2024–25: Bundesliga breakthrough ====
The 2024–25 season represented a major breakthrough for Melsungen. The club made an outstanding start to the Bundesliga campaign and finished the first half of the season at the top of the table, securing the unofficial title of Herbstmeister. Melsungen entered the winter break as league leaders after 17 matches and had established itself as a serious contender for the Bundesliga title.

Melsungen ultimately finished third in the Bundesliga, its best league position in its history at the time. The club also reached the Final Four of the DHB-Pokal for the third consecutive time. In the semi-final, Melsungen defeated HBW Balingen-Weilstetten 31–27 before losing the final 23–28 to THW Kiel.

In the EHF European League, Melsungen reached the Finals in Hamburg. After defeating Bidasoa Irun in the quarter-finals, Melsungen lost 34–35 after extra time to SG Flensburg-Handewitt in the semi-final and subsequently lost 31–37 to THW Kiel in the third-place match, finishing fourth overall.

The 2024–25 season therefore established Melsungen as a genuine contender at both domestic and European level. The third-place Bundesliga finish, another DHB-Pokal final and the appearance in the EHF European League Final Four represented the strongest overall season in the club's history to that point. However, Melsungen remained without a major title.

==== 2025–26: First major title ====
The 2025–26 season became the most successful in MT Melsungen's history. Melsungen entered the EHF European League directly in the group phase, where they were drawn in Group E alongside Benfica, HF Karlskrona and FTC-Green Collect. Melsungen won all six of their group matches and finished first in the group with 12 points.

In the main round, Melsungen were placed in Group III alongside Benfica, IFK Kristianstad and HC Vardar 1961. Melsungen did not play Benfica again in the main round, as the results from their two matches in the previous group phase were carried over to the main-round standings. Melsungen then played four further matches, facing Kristianstad and Vardar each twice. Melsungen lost the first match against Kristianstad but won the return leg, while losing both matches against Vardar. Including the two carried-over results against Benfica, Melsungen finished the main round with three wins and three defeats and advanced to the play-offs.

In the play-offs, Melsungen faced Fredericia Håndboldklub. They lost the first leg 29–35 in Denmark, but overturned the six-goal deficit in the second leg in Kassel, winning 35–26. Melsungen therefore progressed to the quarter-finals with a 64–61 aggregate victory.

In the quarter-finals, Melsungen faced FC Porto. They won the first leg 28–23 in Kassel, but lost the return leg 19–23 in Porto. Melsungen nevertheless advanced by a single goal, winning the tie 47–46 on aggregate and reaching the EHF Finals in Hamburg for the second consecutive season.

In the semi-final on 30 May 2026, Melsungen defeated SG Flensburg-Handewitt 37–30 after leading 15–14 at half-time. On 31 May 2026, Melsungen faced THW Kiel in the final at the Barclays Arena in Hamburg. Melsungen won 24–23 after leading 13–12 at half-time.

The victory was the first major title in MT Melsungen's history, either domestically or internationally. Goalkeeper Nebojša Simić was named Most Valuable Player of the EHF Finals after making 27 saves across the semi-final and final.

Melsungen became the fourth German club to win the EHF European League, following SC Magdeburg, Füchse Berlin and SG Flensburg-Handewitt. The title also secured Melsungen's qualification for the EHF Champions League for the 2026–27 season.

==== 2026–27: First Champions League appearance ====
Winning the EHF European League secured Melsungen a place in the EHF Champions League for the first time in club history. For the 2026–27 season, the men's Champions League was expanded to 24 teams, divided into six groups of four. Melsungen was drawn into Group B together with HBC Nantes, Orlen Wisła Płock and HC Vardar 1961.

Melsungen made its Champions League debut on 10 September 2026 at home against HC Vardar 1961. In front of 2,437 spectators at the Rothenbach-Halle, Melsungen won 33–31 (16–15), securing its first points and its first victory in the competition. The match also produced a notable milestone in the club's history: Dimitri Ignatow, who had come through Melsungen's youth system, scored the first goal in the club's Champions League history when he made it 1–1 in the second minute. Ignatow's goal made him the first Melsungen player to score in the European premier club competition. With three home victories and qualification for the main round, Melsungen made a successful debut in the EHF Champions League, despite losing two of its three away matches and drawing the third. In the main round, Melsungen will face One Veszprém KC, Füchse Berlin, Aalborg Håndbold and Paris Saint-Germain. The points earned against Orlen Wisła Płock in the group phase will be carried over to the main round.

By qualifying for the main round, Melsungen extended its historic debut season in the Champions League and secured the opportunity to face several of Europe's leading clubs.

== Club information ==
=== Crest ===
MT Melsungen's club colours are red and white, which are also the primary colours used in the club's crest, team kits and supporter materials. The club's visual identity has remained closely associated with the colours since the establishment of MT Melsungen under its current name.

=== Supporters ===
The club's organised supporter base includes several fan clubs, most notably Die Bartenwetzer, MT Supporters Kassel and the MT-Trommler. The Bartenwetzer have traditionally been associated with the club's home town of Melsungen, while the MT Supporters Kassel represent supporters from the nearby city of Kassel. The MT-Trommler are known for providing organised drumming support during matches.

The fan clubs regularly coordinate their activities at home matches and travel to support the team at away games. The MT-Trommler in particular form a visible part of the matchday atmosphere through their coordinated drumming.

The club also maintains an official fan representative (Fanbeauftragter) as a point of contact between MT Melsungen, its fan clubs and supporters. The role is intended to facilitate communication between the club and its organised supporter groups.

=== Rivalries ===
==== HSG Wetzlar ====
The rivalry between MT Melsungen and HSG Wetzlar is one of the most prominent rivalries in Hessian men's handball. The two clubs have regularly met in the Bundesliga since Melsungen's promotion to the top flight in 2005, with their encounters commonly referred to as the Hessenderby (Hesse derby). The fixture is considered more than an ordinary league match, with regional prestige and the ambition to be regarded as the strongest men's handball club in Hesse contributing to its significance.

The rivalry was further fuelled by the subsequent movement of personnel between the clubs. Several players and officials who had been closely associated with Wetzlar subsequently joined Melsungen. Among them were Michael Allendorf, who moved from Wetzlar to Melsungen in 2009. Michael Roth also later became head coach of Melsungen, while Axel Geerken subsequently became involved with the Melsungen organisation. The repeated movement of players, coaches and officials between the two clubs contributed to the increasingly heated atmosphere surrounding the Hessian derby and made matches between Wetzlar and Melsungen particularly emotional for supporters of both sides.

The intensity of the rivalry subsequently declined, although the fixture has retained its special status among supporters. HSG Wetzlar has continued to describe matches against Melsungen as a particularly emotional Hessian derby, while noting that the relationship between the two clubs has become more normalised compared with the earlier period.

==== HSG Gensungen/Felsberg ====
A historically significant local rivalry developed between Melsungen and neighbouring HSG Gensungen/Felsberg. The two clubs represent towns only a few kilometres apart in North Hesse, making the fixture a local derby in the truest sense. Their close geographical proximity, combined with the clubs' regular meetings in the lower divisions of German handball, contributed to a strong rivalry between the two neighbouring communities.

The rivalry can be traced back to the early 1990s, when Melsunger TG and TSV Jahn Gensungen met in the Regionalliga Südwest. Following the formation of HSG Gensungen/Felsberg, the clubs subsequently faced each other in the 2. Handball-Bundesliga. From the late 1990s until Melsungen's promotion to the Bundesliga in 2005, the two teams regularly competed against each other.

During this period, Melsungen competed first as Melsunger TG and later, from 1999, as MSG Melsungen/Böddiger. The matches were frequently closely contested. In the 1997–98 2. Handball-Bundesliga season, HSG Gensungen/Felsberg and Melsunger TG drew 18–18 in Gensungen, while Melsungen won the return fixture 25–24. The following season saw Gensungen/Felsberg win both matches, 19–16 and 23–21. Subsequent seasons produced a series of similarly close encounters, including several victories by one or two goals.

The final season in which the two clubs met in the second division was 2004-2005 2. Handball-Bundesliga season. Melsungen, then playing as MSG Melsungen/Böddiger, won both matches against Gensungen/Felsberg, 29–28 at home and 32–27 away. Melsungen's promotion to the Bundesliga in 2005 subsequently ended the regular first-team league rivalry between the neighbouring clubs.

The local rivalry continued at reserve-team level, with Melsungen's reserve team and ESG Gensungen/Felsberg meeting in the Oberliga Hessen in the 2015–16 and 2016–17 seasons. The matches continued the tradition of the North Hessian derby between the neighbouring towns.

=== Social responsibility ===
MT Melsungen has undertaken various social and community initiatives alongside its sporting activities. The club describes its commitment to social responsibility as part of its broader sustainability strategy, which also includes environmental and economic sustainability. Its social activities focus particularly on youth development, inclusion, diversity and equal opportunities.

One of the club's most prominent inclusion projects is the Glücksliga, a handball programme based on the Danish LykkeLiga concept. In April 2023, MT Melsungen became the first German men's Bundesliga club to establish a Glücksliga team. The MT Glückskinder provides children and young people with developmental delays and/or physical or intellectual disabilities with the opportunity to play handball without competitive pressure. Training takes place regularly in Guxhagen, and the team also participates in Glücksliga tournaments. The initiative is intended to provide an inclusive environment in which children can participate in sport, develop socially and experience handball regardless of their individual abilities.

=== Kit manufacturers ===
Period	Kit manufacturer	Icon
1991-2001	(Germany) ERIMA	
2001-2007	?	
2007-2013	(Germany) PUMA	
2013–2019	(Sweden) SALMING	
2019–	(Germany) ERIMA	

HOME
2008–09	2013–14	2014–17	2017–18	2019–20	2021–

AWAY
2013–14	2014–17	2017–18	2019–20	2020–21

== Sports Hall information ==
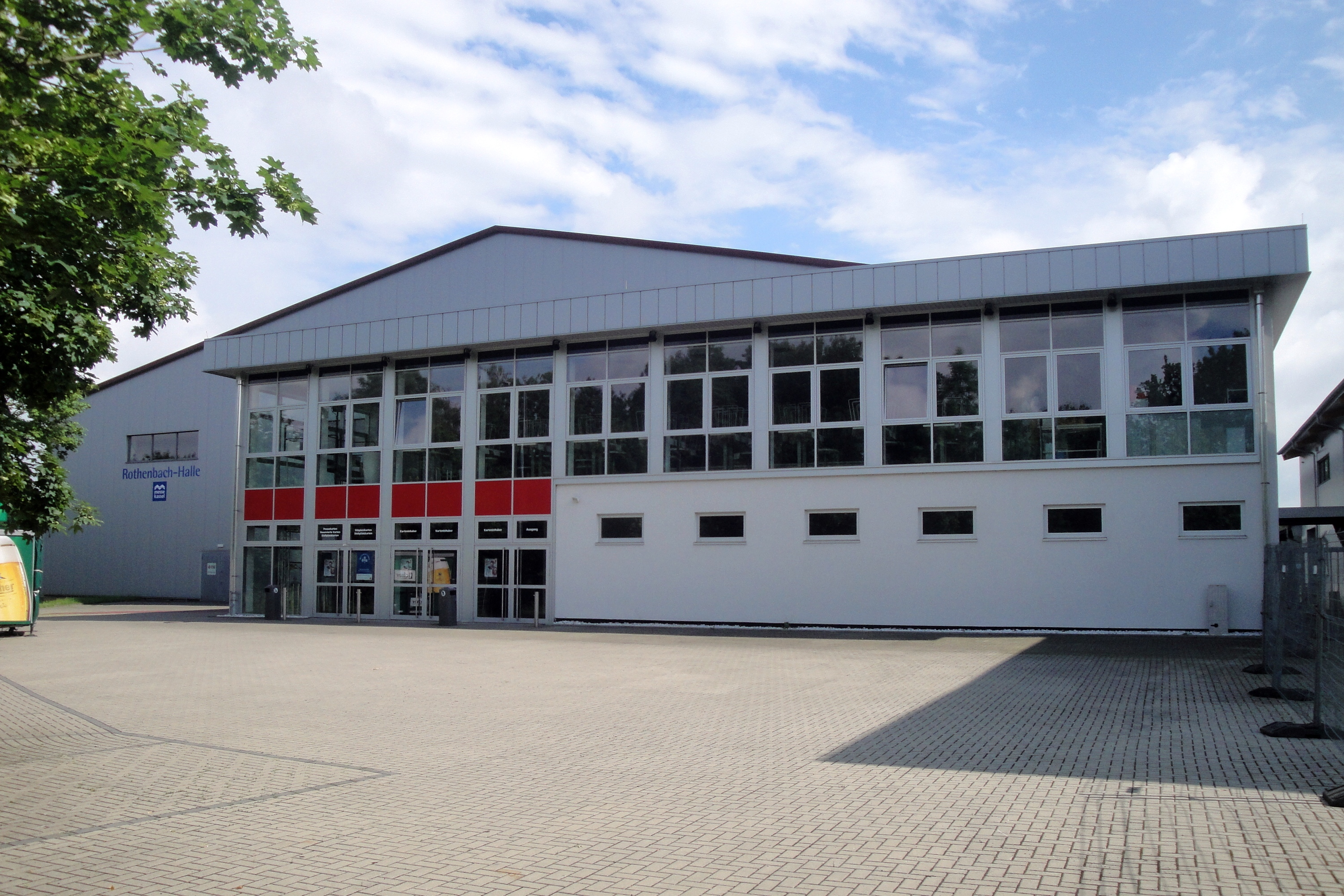
Home hall: Rothenbach-Halle

- Name: – Rothenbach-Halle
- City: – Kassel
- Capacity: – 4500
- Address: – Damaschkestraße 55, 34121 Kassel, Germany
- Period: 12/2007 until 06/2027

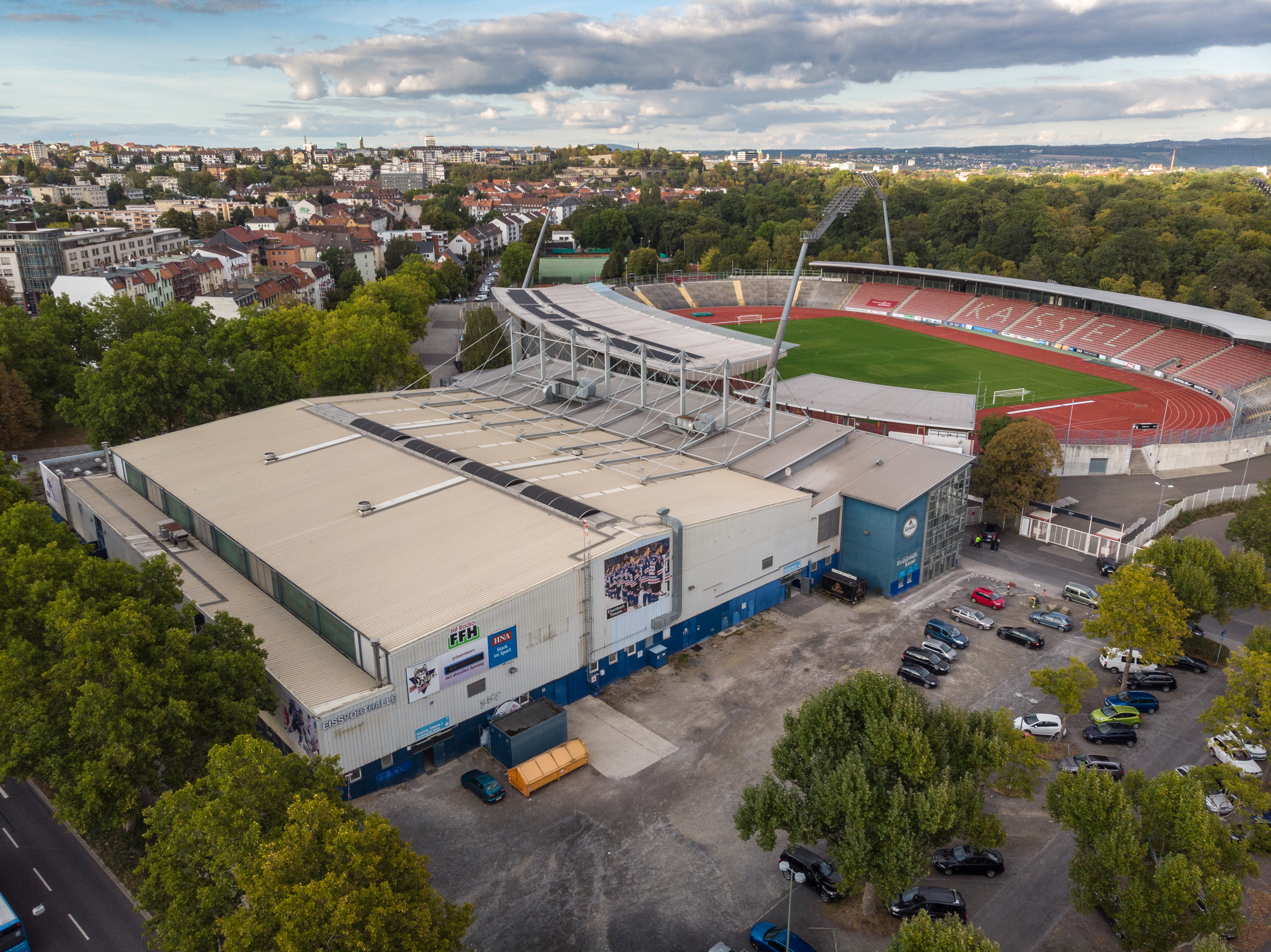
Home hall: Probonio Arena

- Name: – Probonio Arena
- City: – Kassel
- Capacity: – 6200
- Address: – Am Auestadion 1, 34121 Kassel, Germany
- Period: from 07/2027

== Team ==
=== Current squad ===
Squad for the 2026–27 season

Goalkeepers

- 12 (Germany) Kim Hüter
- 16 (Montenegro) Nebojša Simić
- 32 (Hungary) Kristóf Palasics

Left Wingers

- 7 (Croatia) David Mandić
- 18 (Germany) Florian Drosten
- 31 (Cuba) Dariel García Rivera
- 34 (Croatia) Lino Duketis

Right Wingers

- 11 (Germany) Dimitri Ignatow
- 73 (Germany) Timo Kastening

Line players

- 2 (Spain) Rubén Marchán
- 8 (Hungary) Adrián Sipos
- 14 (Germany) Johannes Golla
- 64 (Germany) Jason Wilfer

Left Backs

- 19 (Iceland) Reynir Þór Stefánsson
- 24 (Spain) Daniel Dujshebaev
- 33 (Denmark) Aaron Mensing

Centre Backs

- 6 (Spain) Erik Balenciaga
- 25 (Sweden) Olle Forsell Schefvert
- 28 (Switzerland) Luca Sigrist

Right Backs

- 4 (Denmark) Nikolaj Enderleit
- 5 (Germany) Leander Altena
- 10 (Latvia) Dainis Krištopāns

explanation of symbols

- - team captain | - injured | - development squad

=== Transfers ===
Transfers for the 2027–28 season

Joining

- (Germany) Leon Stehl (RW) back from loan (Germany) TV Hüttenberg
- (Sweden) Erik Persson (RB) from (Germany) Frisch Auf Göppingen

Leaving

- (Latvia) Dainis Krištopāns (RB) to ?

=== Staff ===
- Director of Sport: (Sweden) Jesper Larsson
- Head coach: (Spain) Roberto García Parrondo
- Assistant coach: (Spain) Isaías Guardiola
- Goalkeeper Trainer: (Germany) Carsten Lichtlein
- Athletic Trainer: (Germany) Johannes Reuter
- Teammanager: (Germany) Matthias Horn
- Physiotherapist: (Germany) Jule Schröder-Junghans
- Physiotherapist: (Germany) Niklas Kern
- Club doctor: (Germany) Dr. med. Marco Spielmann
- Club doctor: (Germany) Dr. med. Mark Jungermann
- Club doctor: (Germany) Lotta Jacob
- Club doctor: (Germany) Dr. Karl-Friedrich Appel

=== Transfer History ===
Transfers for the 2026–27 season

Joining

- (Spain) Daniel Dujshebaev (LB) from (Poland) KS Iskra Kielce
- (Switzerland) Luca Sigrist (CB) from (Switzerland) HC Kriens-Luzern
- (Cuba) Dariel García (LW) from (Spain) CD Bidasoa
- (Germany) Johannes Golla (LP) from (Germany) SG Flensburg-Handewitt

Leaving

- (Iceland) Arnar Freyr Arnarsson (LP) to (Germany) SG Flensburg-Handewitt
- (Tunisia) Mohamed Darmoul (CB) to (Germany) TVB Stuttgart
- (Belarus) Uladzislau Kulesh (LB) to (Serbia) RK Partizan
- (Hungary) László Bartucz (GK) to (Germany) HSG Wetzlar
- (Spain) Martí Soler (LW) to (Germany) HSG Wetzlar
- (Poland) Paweł Krawczyk (GK) to (Germany) Eulen Ludwigshafen
- (Germany) Bruno Eickhoff (LP) on loan at (Germany) Eulen Ludwigshafen
- (Germany) Jonas Riecke (RB) to (Austria) Handball Tirol
- (Portugal) Alexandre Cavalcanti (LB) to ?

Transfers for the 2025–26 season

Joining

- (Belarus) Uladzislau Kulesh (LB) from (Germany) TSV Hannover-Burgdorf
- (Hungary) Kristóf Palasics (GK) from (Hungary) ONE Veszprém
- (Hungary) László Bartucz (GK) from (Hungary) MOL Tatabánya KC
- (Sweden) Olle Forsell Schefvert (LB) from (Germany) Rhein Neckar-Löwen
- (Spain) Isaías Guardiola (RB) from (Spain) BM Nava
- (Spain) Rubén Marchán (LP) from (France) Paris Saint-Germain
- (Iceland) Reynir Þór Stefánsson (CB) from (Iceland) Fram
- (France) Sadou Ntanzi (CB) on loan till 12/2025 from (Qatar) Al Arabi SC
- (Germany) Friedrich Schmitt (LB) on loan till 10/2025 from (Germany) TSG Friesenheim

Leaving

- (Iceland) Elvar Örn Jónsson (LB) to (Germany) SC Magdeburg
- (Poland) Adam Morawski (GK) to (Poland) Vive Kielce
- (Sweden) Jonathan Svensson (LB) to (Denmark) HØJ Elite
- (Brazil) Rogério Moraes Ferreira (P) (to (France) Montpellier Handball)
- (Spain) Ian Barrufet (LW) loan back to (Spain) FC Barcelona
- (Germany) Tom Wolf (LB) to (Germany) TUSEM Essen
- (Germany) Leon Stehl (RW) on loan at (Germany) TV Hüttenberg

== Previous squads ==
2025–2026 Team
Shirt No	Nationality	Player	Birth Date	Position
2	Spain	Rubén Marchán	20 September 1994 (age 32)	Line Player
4	Denmark	Nikolaj Enderleit	21 June 1997 (age 29)	Right Back
6	Spain	Erik Balenciaga	10 May 1993 (age 33)	Central Back
7	Croatia	David Mandić	14 September 1997 (age 29)	Left Winger
8	Hungary	Adrián Sipos	8 March 1990 (age 36)	Line Player
10	Latvia	Dainis Kristopans	27 September 1990 (age 36)	Right Back
11	Germany	Dimitri Ignatow	30 November 1998 (age 27)	Right Winger
16	Montenegro	Nebojša Simić	19 January 1993 (age 33)	Goalkeeper
18	Germany	Florian Drosten	17 June 2004 (age 22)	Left Winger
19	Iceland	Reynir Þór Stefánsson	5 August 2005 (age 21)	Left Back
20	Belarus	Uladzislau Kulesh	28 May 1996 (age 30)	Left Back
21	Iceland	Arnar Freyr Arnarsson	14 March 1996 (age 30)	Line Player
23	Spain	Martí Soler	28 April 2003 (age 23)	Left Winger
24	Portugal	Alexandre Cavalcanti	27 December 1996 (age 29)	Left Back
25	Sweden	Olle Forsell Schefvert	13 August 1993 (age 33)	Central Back
29	Germany	Friedrich Schmitt	3 October 2004 (age 22)	Left Back
32	Hungary	Kristóf Palasics	19 April 2002 (age 24)	Goalkeeper
33	Denmark	Aaron Mensing	11 November 1997 (age 28)	Left Back
36	Poland	Pawel Krawczyk	7 July 2005 (age 21)	Goalkeeper
40	Spain	Isaías Guardiola	1 October 1984 (age 42)	Right Back
44	Germany	Jonas Riecke	11 January 2005 (age 21)	Right Back
53	Germany	Bruno Eickhoff	29 December 2003 (age 22)	Line Player
61	Hungary	László Bartucz	5 November 1991 (age 34)	Goalkeeper
71	Tunisia	Mohamed Darmoul	4 February 1998 (age 28)	Central Back
73	Germany	Timo Kastening	25 June 1995 (age 31)	Right Winger
91	France	Sadou Ntanzi	7 January 2000 (age 26)	Central Back

2024–2025 Team
Shirt No	Nationality	Player	Birth Date	Position
1	Poland	Adam Morawski	17 October 1994 (age 32)	Goalkeeper
4	Denmark	Nikolaj Enderleit	21 June 1997 (age 29)	Right Back
6	Spain	Erik Balenciaga	10 May 1993 (age 33)	Central Back
7	Croatia	David Mandić	14 September 1997 (age 29)	Left Winger
8	Hungary	Adrián Sipos	8 March 1990 (age 36)	Line Player
10	Latvia	Dainis Kristopans	27 September 1990 (age 36)	Right Back
11	Germany	Dimitri Ignatow	30 November 1998 (age 27)	Right Winger
13	Brazil	Rogério Moraes Ferreira	11 January 1994 (age 32)	Line Player
16	Montenegro	Nebojša Simić	19 January 1993 (age 33)	Goalkeeper
17	Germany	Felix Danner	24 July 1985 (age 41)	Line Player
18	Germany	Florian Drosten	17 June 2004 (age 22)	Left Winger
19	Iceland	Elvar Örn Jónsson	31 August 1997 (age 29)	Central Back
21	Iceland	Arnar Freyr Arnarsson	14 March 1996 (age 30)	Line Player
23	Spain	Martí Soler	28 April 2003 (age 23)	Left Winger
24	Portugal	Alexandre Cavalcanti	27 December 1996 (age 29)	Left Back
28	Sweden	Jonathan Svensson	27 January 1998 (age 28)	Left Back
33	Denmark	Aaron Mensing	11 November 1997 (age 28)	Left Back
36	Poland	Pawel Krawczyk	7 July 2005 (age 21)	Goalkeeper
44	Germany	Jonas Riecke	11 January 2005 (age 21)	Right Back
53	Germany	Bruno Eickhoff	29 December 2003 (age 22)	Line Player
71	Germany	Mohamed Darmoul	4 February 1998 (age 28)	Central Back
73	Germany	Timo Kastening	25 June 1995 (age 31)	Right Winger
80	Germany	Carsten Lichtlein	4 November 1980 (age 45)	Goalkeeper
83	Spain	Ian Barrufet	19 May 2004 (age 22)	Left Winger

2023–2024 Team
Shirt No	Nationality	Player	Birth Date	Position
1	Poland	Adam Morawski	17 October 1994 (age 32)	Goalkeeper
5	Germany	Julius Kühn	1 April 1993 (age 33)	Left Back
6	Spain	Erik Balenciaga	10 May 1993 (age 33)	Central Back
7	Croatia	David Mandic	14 September 1997 (age 29)	Left Winger
8	Hungary	Adrian Sipos	8 March 1990 (age 36)	Line Player
10	Latvia	Dainis Kristopans	27 September 1990 (age 36)	Right Back
11	Germany	Dimitri Ignatow	30 November 1998 (age 27)	Right Winger
13	Brazil	Rogerio Moraes	11 January 1994 (age 32)	Line Player
14	Germany	Ben Beekmann	10 December 2002 (age 23)	Left Winger
15	Germany	Lasse Ohl	25 February 2005 (age 21)	Line Player
16	Montenegro	Nebojša Simić	19 January 1993 (age 33)	Goalkeeper
18	Germany	Florian Drosten	17 June 2004 (age 22)	Left Winger
19	Iceland	Elvar Örn Jónsson	31 August 1997 (age 29)	Central Back
21	Iceland	Arnar Freyr Arnarsson	14 March 1996 (age 30)	Line Player
25	Germany	Jan Waldgenbach	25 April 2001 (age 25)	Right Back
26	Germany	Tom Wolf	2 March 2006 (age 20)	Left Back
27	Norway	Sindre Aho	20 July 1997 (age 29)	Central Back
32	Germany	Leon Stehl	2 August 2006 (age 20)	Right Winger
36	Germany	Manuel Hörr	3 November 2004 (age 21)	Left Back
55	Croatia	Ivan Martinovic	6 January 1998 (age 28)	Right Back
73	Germany	Timo Kastening	25 June 1995 (age 31)	Right Winger
94	Croatia	Domagoj Pavlović	21 March 1993 (age 33)	Central Back

2022–2023 Team
Shirt No	Nationality	Player	Birth Date	Position
1	Poland	Adam Morawski	17 October 1994 (age 32)	Goalkeeper
5	Germany	Julius Kühn	1 April 1993 (age 33)	Left Back
6	Germany	Finn Lemke	30 April 1992 (age 34)	Left Back
7	Lithuania	Aidenas Malasinskas	29 April 1986 (age 40)	Central Back
8	Spain	Agustin Casado	21 May 1996 (age 30)	Central Back
11	Germany	Dimitri Ignatow	30 November 1998 (age 27)	Right Winger
13	Brazil	Rogerio Moraes	11 January 1994 (age 32)	Line Player
14	Germany	Ben Beekmann	10 December 2002 (age 23)	Left Winger
15	Germany	Lasse Ohl	25 February 2005 (age 21)	Line Player
16	Montenegro	Nebojša Simić	19 January 1993 (age 33)	Goalkeeper
18	Germany	Florian Drosten	17 June 2004 (age 22)	Left Winger
19	Iceland	Elvar Örn Jónsson	31 August 1997 (age 29)	Central Back
21	Iceland	Arnar Freyr Arnarsson	14 March 1996 (age 30)	Line Player
25	Germany	Jan Waldgenbach	25 April 2001 (age 25)	Right Back
26	Germany	Tom Wolf	2 March 2006 (age 20)	Left Back
27	Portugal	André Gomes	27 July 1998 (age 28)	Left Back
29	Germany	Florian Potzkai	6 February 2004 (age 22)	Right Winger
30	Russia	Gleb Kalarash	29 November 1990 (age 35)	Line Player
34	Germany	Kai Häfner	10 July 1989 (age 37)	Right Back
36	Germany	Manuel Hörr	3 November 2004 (age 21)	Left Back
46	Germany	Julian Fuchs	2 March 2001 (age 25)	Right Winger
55	Germany	Ivan Martinovic	6 January 1998 (age 28)	Right Back
71	Germany	Erik Ulrich	8 January 2001 (age 25)	Goalkeeper
73	Germany	Timo Kastening	25 June 1995 (age 31)	Right Winger
77	Croatia	David Mandic	14 September 1997 (age 29)	Left Winger
94	Croatia	Domagoj Pavlović	21 March 1993 (age 33)	Central Back

2021–2022 Team
Shirt No	Nationality	Player	Birth Date	Position
1	Germany	Erik Ulrich	8 January 2001 (age 25)	Goalkeeper
3	Croatia	Marino Marić	1 June 1990 (age 36)	Line Player
5	Germany	Julius Kühn	1 April 1993 (age 33)	Left Back
6	Germany	Finn Lemke	30 April 1992 (age 34)	Left Back
8	Germany	Paul Kompenhans	8 October 2002 (age 24)	Central Back
9	Germany	Tobias Reichmann	27 May 1988 (age 38)	Right Winger
12	Germany	Silvio Heinevetter	21 October 1984 (age 42)	Goalkeeper
14	Germany	Ben Beekmann	10 December 2002 (age 23)	Left Winger
15	Germany	Yves Kunkel	13 May 1994 (age 32)	Left Winger
16	Montenegro	Nebojša Simić	19 January 1993 (age 33)	Goalkeeper
17	Germany	Felix Danner	24 July 1985 (age 41)	Line Player
18	Germany	Florian Drosten	17 June 2004 (age 22)	Left Winger
19	Iceland	Elvar Örn Jónsson	31 August 1997 (age 29)	Central Back
21	Iceland	Arnar Freyr Arnarsson	14 March 1996 (age 30)	Line Player
22	Germany	Michael Allendorf	16 September 1986 (age 40)	Left Winger
27	Portugal	André Gomes	27 July 1998 (age 28)	Left Back
29	Germany	Florian Potzkai	6 February 2004 (age 22)	Right Winger
30	Russia	Gleb Kalarash	29 November 1990 (age 35)	Line Player
34	Germany	Kai Häfner	10 July 1989 (age 37)	Right Back
35	Turkey	Rohat Sahin	1 April 2002 (age 24)	Line Player
36	Germany	Manuel Hörr	3 November 2004 (age 21)	Left Back
41	Iceland	Alexander Petersson	2 July 1980 (age 46)	Right Back
46	Germany	Julian Fuchs	2 March 2001 (age 25)	Right Winger
72	Germany	Jan-Lasse Herbst	10 December 2001 (age 24)	Goalkeeper
73	Germany	Timo Kastening	25 June 1995 (age 31)	Right Winger
94	Croatia	Domagoj Pavlović	21 March 1993 (age 33)	Central Back
97	Germany	David Kuntscher	15 February 2002 (age 24)	Right Back

2020–2021 Team
Shirt No	Nationality	Player	Birth Date	Position
1	Germany	Erik Ullrich	8 January 2001 (age 25)	Goalkeeper
3	Croatia	Marino Marić	1 June 1990 (age 36)	Line Player
5	Germany	Julius Kühn	1 April 1993 (age 33)	Left Back
6	Germany	Finn Lemke	30 April 1992 (age 34)	Left Back
9	Germany	Tobias Reichmann	27 May 1988 (age 38)	Right Winger
12	Germany	Silvio Heinevetter	21 October 1984 (age 42)	Goalkeeper
13	Germany	Yves Kunkel	13 May 1994 (age 32)	Left Winger
14	Germany	Ben Beekmann	10 December 2002 (age 23)	Left Winger
15	Denmark	Lasse Mikkelsen	19 May 1988 (age 38)	Central Back
16	Montenegro	Nebojša Simić	19 January 1993 (age 33)	Goalkeeper
17	Germany	Felix Danner	24 July 1985 (age 41)	Line Player
21	Iceland	Arnar Freyr Arnarsson	14 March 1996 (age 30)	Line Player
22	Germany	Michael Allendorf	16 September 1986 (age 40)	Left Winger
23	Germany	Ole Pregler	26 May 2002 (age 24)	Left Back
34	Germany	Kai Häfner	10 July 1989 (age 37)	Right Back
55	Germany	Stefan Salger	15 August 1996 (age 30)	Right Back
73	Germany	Timo Kastening	25 June 1995 (age 31)	Right Winger
94	Croatia	Domagoj Pavlović	21 March 1993 (age 33)	Central Back
93	Germany	David Kuntscher	15 February 2002 (age 24)	Right Back Back
95	Germany	Paul Kompenhans	8 October 2002 (age 24)	Central Back
96	Germany	Glenn-Louis Eggert	5 April 2000 (age 26)	Goalkeeper

2019–2020 Team
Shirt No	Nationality	Player	Birth Date	Position
1	Sweden	Johan Sjöstrand	26 February 1987 (age 39)	Goalkeeper
3	Croatia	Marino Marić	1 June 1990 (age 36)	Line Player
5	Germany	Julius Kühn	1 April 1993 (age 33)	Left Back
6	Germany	Finn Lemke	30 April 1992 (age 34)	Left Back
9	Germany	Tobias Reichmann	27 May 1988 (age 38)	Right Winger
11	Germany	Dimitri Ignatow	30 November 1998 (age 27)	Right Winger
13	Germany	Yves Kunkel	13 May 1994 (age 32)	Left Winger
15	Denmark	Lasse Mikkelsen	19 May 1988 (age 38)	Central Back
16	Montenegro	Nebojša Simić	19 January 1993 (age 33)	Goalkeeper
17	Germany	Felix Danner	24 July 1985 (age 41)	Line Player
19	Germany	Timm Schneider	15 June 1988 (age 38)	Central Back
22	Germany	Michael Allendorf	16 September 1986 (age 40)	Left Winger
27	Switzerland	Roman Sidorowicz	8 August 1991 (age 35)	Central Back
34	Germany	Kai Häfner	10 July 1989 (age 37)	Right Back
55	Germany	Stefan Salger	15 August 1996 (age 30)	Right Back
94	Croatia	Domagoj Pavlović	21 March 1993 (age 33)	Central Back
96	Germany	Glenn-Louis Eggert	5 April 2000 (age 26)	Goalkeeper
98	Germany	Jona Gruber	19 May 2000 (age 26)	Left Back
99	Germany	Ole Pregler	26 May 2002 (age 24)	Left Back

2018–2019 Team
Shirt No	Nationality	Player	Birth Date	Position
1	Sweden	Johan Sjöstrand	26 February 1987 (age 39)	Goalkeeper
3	Croatia	Marino Marić	1 June 1990 (age 36)	Line Player
5	Germany	Julius Kühn	1 April 1993 (age 33)	Left Back
6	Germany	Finn Lemke	30 April 1992 (age 34)	Left Back
9	Germany	Tobias Reichmann	27 May 1988 (age 38)	Right Winger
11	Germany	Dimitri Ignatow	30 November 1998 (age 27)	Right Winger
13	Germany	Yves Kunkel	13 May 1994 (age 32)	Left Winger
15	Denmark	Lasse Mikkelsen	19 May 1988 (age 38)	Central Back
16	Montenegro	Nebojša Simić	19 January 1993 (age 33)	Goalkeeper
17	Germany	Felix Danner	24 July 1985 (age 41)	Line Player
18	Germany	Philipp Müller	19 September 1984 (age 42)	Left Back
19	Germany	Timm Schneider	15 June 1988 (age 38)	Central Back
22	Germany	Michael Allendorf	16 September 1986 (age 40)	Left Winger
23	Denmark	Simon Birkefeldt	22 January 1991 (age 35)	Right Back
25	Germany	Michael Müller	19 September 1984 (age 42)	Right Back
27	Switzerland	Roman Sidorowicz	8 August 1991 (age 35)	Central Back
94	Croatia	Domagoj Pavlović	21 March 1993 (age 33)	Central Back
99	Germany	Julian Damm	30 May 2000 (age 26)	Line Player

2017–2018 Team
Shirt No	Nationality	Player	Birth Date	Position
1	Sweden	Johan Sjöstrand	26 February 1987 (age 39)	Goalkeeper
3	Croatia	Marino Marić	1 June 1990 (age 36)	Line Player
5	Germany	Julius Kühn	1 April 1993 (age 33)	Left Back
6	Germany	Finn Lemke	30 April 1992 (age 34)	Left Back
8	Germany	Johannes Golla	5 November 1997 (age 28)	Line Player
9	Germany	Tobias Reichmann	27 May 1988 (age 38)	Right Winger
11	Germany	Dimitri Ignatow	30 November 1998 (age 27)	Right Winger
12	Germany	Mathias Lenz	24 January 1985 (age 41)	Goalkeeper
15	Denmark	Lasse Mikkelsen	19 May 1988 (age 38)	Central Back
16	Montenegro	Nebojša Simić	19 January 1993 (age 33)	Goalkeeper
17	Germany	Felix Danner	24 July 1985 (age 41)	Line Player
18	Germany	Philipp Müller	19 September 1984 (age 42)	Left Back
19	Netherlands	Jeffrey Boomhouwer	15 June 1988 (age 38)	Left Winger
21	Germany	Timm Schneider	15 June 1988 (age 38)	Central Back
22	Germany	Michael Allendorf	16 September 1986 (age 40)	Left Winger
24	Estonia	Dener Jaanimaa	9 August 1989 (age 37)	Right Back
25	Germany	Michael Müller	19 September 1984 (age 42)	Right Back
36	Netherlands	Arjan Haenen	12 July 1987 (age 39)	Right Winger
39	Germany	Gabor Langhans	10 April 1989 (age 37)	Right Back

2016–2017 Team
Shirt No	Nationality	Player	Birth Date	Position
1	Sweden	Johan Sjöstrand	26 February 1987 (age 39)	Goalkeeper
3	Croatia	Marino Marić	1 June 1990 (age 36)	Line Player
5	Germany	Johannes Sellin	31 December 1990 (age 35)	Right Winger
8	Germany	Johannes Golla	5 November 1997 (age 28)	Line Player
9	Sweden	Patrik Fahlgren	27 June 1985 (age 41)	Central Back
12	Serbia	Svetislav Verkić	11 June 1981 (age 45)	Goalkeeper
16	Germany	Maurice Paske	21 February 1996 (age 30)	Goalkeeper
17	Germany	Felix Danner	24 July 1985 (age 41)	Line Player
18	Germany	Philipp Müller	19 September 1984 (age 42)	Left Back
19	Netherlands	Jeffrey Boomhouwer	15 June 1988 (age 38)	Left Winger
20	Serbia	Momir Rnić	1 November 1987 (age 38)	Left Back
21	Germany	Timm Schneider	15 June 1988 (age 38)	Central Back
22	Germany	Michael Allendorf	16 September 1986 (age 40)	Left Winger
23	Serbia	Nenad Vučković	23 August 1980 (age 46)	Central Back
24	Estonia	Dener Jaanimaa	9 August 1989 (age 37)	Right Back
25	Germany	Michael Müller	19 September 1984 (age 42)	Right Back
30	Denmark	René Villadsen	18 April 1986 (age 40)	Goalkeeper
36	Netherlands	Arjan Haenen	12 July 1987 (age 39)	Right Winger
39	Germany	Gabor Langhans	10 April 1989 (age 37)	Right Back
41	Germany	Fin Backs	22 April 1998 (age 28)	Left Winger
97	Germany	Jan Grolla	9 December 1997 (age 28)	Right Back

2015–2016 Team
Shirt No	Nationality	Player	Birth Date	Position
1	Sweden	Johan Sjöstrand	26 February 1987 (age 39)	Goalkeeper
3	Croatia	Marino Marić	1 June 1990 (age 36)	Line Player
5	Germany	Johannes Sellin	31 December 1990 (age 35)	Right Winger
8	Germany	Johannes Golla	5 November 1997 (age 28)	Line Player
9	Sweden	Patrik Fahlgren	27 June 1985 (age 41)	Central Back
10	Germany	Malte Schröder	16 February 1987 (age 39)	Right Back
13	Germany	Jan Forstbauer	17 April 1992 (age 34)	Right Back
14	Germany	Christian Hildebrand	23 December 1985 (age 40)	Right Winger
17	Germany	Felix Danner	24 July 1985 (age 41)	Line Player
18	Germany	Philipp Müller	19 September 1984 (age 42)	Left Back
19	Netherlands	Jeffrey Boomhouwer	15 June 1988 (age 38)	Left Winger
20	Serbia	Momir Rnić	1 November 1987 (age 38)	Left Back
21	Germany	Timm Schneider	15 June 1988 (age 38)	Central Back
22	Germany	Michael Allendorf	16 September 1986 (age 40)	Left Winger
23	Serbia	Nenad Vučković	23 August 1980 (age 46)	Central Back
25	Germany	Michael Müller	19 September 1984 (age 42)	Right Back
30	Denmark	René Villadsen	18 April 1986 (age 40)	Goalkeeper

2014–2015 Team
Shirt No	Nationality	Player	Birth Date	Position
1	Sweden	Mikael Appelgren	6 September 1989 (age 37)	Goalkeeper
3	Croatia	Marino Marić	1 June 1990 (age 36)	Line Player
5	Germany	Johannes Sellin	31 December 1990 (age 35)	Right Winger
9	Sweden	Patrik Fahlgren	27 June 1985 (age 41)	Central Back
10	Germany	Malte Schröder	16 February 1987 (age 39)	Right Back
12	Sweden	Per Sandström	11 January 1981 (age 45)	Goalkeeper
13	Germany	Jan Forstbauer	17 April 1992 (age 34)	Right Back
14	Germany	Christian Hildebrand	23 December 1985 (age 40)	Right Winger
15	Germany	Merlin Kothe	24 September 1995 (age 31)	Left Back
16	Germany	Sebastian Ullrich	23 April 1992 (age 34)	Goalkeeper
17	Germany	Felix Danner	24 July 1985 (age 41)	Line Player
18	Germany	Philipp Müller	19 September 1984 (age 42)	Left Back
19	Netherlands	Jeffrey Boomhouwer	15 June 1988 (age 38)	Left Winger
20	Serbia	Momir Rnić	1 November 1987 (age 38)	Left Back
22	Germany	Michael Allendorf	16 September 1986 (age 40)	Left Winger
23	Serbia	Nenad Vučković	23 August 1980 (age 46)	Central Back
25	Germany	Michael Müller	19 September 1984 (age 42)	Right Back
27	Germany	Heiko Grimm	18 November 1977 (age 48)	Central Back

2013–2014 Team
Shirt No	Nationality	Player	Birth Date	Position
1	Sweden	Mikael Appelgren	6 September 1989 (age 37)	Goalkeeper
3	Sweden	Jonathan Stenbäcken	7 January 1988 (age 38)	Left Back
4	Sweden	Anton Månsson	9 January 1989 (age 37)	Line Player
5	Germany	Johannes Sellin	31 December 1990 (age 35)	Right Winger
7	Czech Republic	Daniel Kubeš	7 February 1978 (age 48)	Line Player
9	Sweden	Patrik Fahlgren	27 June 1985 (age 41)	Central Back
10	Germany	Malte Schröder	16 February 1987 (age 39)	Right Back
12	Sweden	Per Sandström	11 January 1981 (age 45)	Goalkeeper
13	Germany	Jan Forstbauer	17 April 1992 (age 34)	Right Back
14	Germany	Christian Hildebrand	23 December 1985 (age 40)	Right Winger
16	Germany	Colin Räbiger	10 August 1995 (age 31)	Goalkeeper
17	Germany	Felix Danner	24 July 1985 (age 41)	Line Player
18	Germany	Philipp Müller	19 September 1984 (age 42)	Left Back
21	Germany	Christian Zufelde	10 January 1988 (age 38)	Left Winger
22	Germany	Michael Allendorf	16 September 1986 (age 40)	Left Winger
23	Serbia	Nenad Vučković	23 August 1980 (age 46)	Central Back
25	Germany	Michael Müller	19 September 1984 (age 42)	Right Back

2012–2013 Team
Shirt No	Nationality	Player	Birth Date	Position
1	Sweden	Mikael Appelgren	6 September 1989 (age 37)	Goalkeeper
3	Sweden	Jonathan Stenbäcken	7 January 1988 (age 38)	Left Back
4	Sweden	Anton Månsson	9 January 1989 (age 37)	Line Player
7	Czech Republic	Daniel Kubeš	7 February 1978 (age 48)	Line Player
9	Sweden	Patrik Fahlgren	27 June 1985 (age 41)	Central Back
10	Germany	Malte Schröder	16 February 1987 (age 39)	Right Back
12	Sweden	Per Sandström	11 January 1981 (age 45)	Goalkeeper
13	Greece	Alexandros Vasilakis	8 August 1979 (age 47)	Right Back
14	Germany	Christian Hildebrand	23 December 1985 (age 40)	Right Winger
16	Germany	Marc Lauterbach	9 December 1990 (age 35)	Goalkeeper
17	Germany	Felix Danner	24 July 1985 (age 41)	Line Player
18	Greece	Grigorios Sanikis	29 January 1980 (age 46)	Left Back
19	Germany	Max Pregler	11 March 1994 (age 32)	Central Back
20	Greece	Savas Karipidis	23 May 1979 (age 47)	Right Winger
21	Germany	Christian Zufelde	10 January 1988 (age 38)	Left Winger
22	Germany	Michael Allendorf	16 September 1986 (age 40)	Left Winger
23	Serbia	Nenad Vučković	23 August 1980 (age 46)	Central Back
24	Germany	Phil Räbiger	26 April 1990 (age 36)	Left Back

2011–2012 Team
Shirt No	Nationality	Player	Birth Date	Position
1	Croatia	Mario Kelentrić	31 January 1973 (age 53)	Goalkeeper
3	Germany	Jens Schöngarth	7 December 1988 (age 37)	Right Back
4	Sweden	Anton Månsson	9 January 1989 (age 37)	Line Player
8	Germany	Michael Schweikardt	7 March 1983 (age 43)	Central Back
9	Sweden	Patrik Fahlgren	27 June 1985 (age 41)	Central Back
12	Sweden	Per Sandström	11 January 1981 (age 45)	Goalkeeper
13	Greece	Alexandros Vasilakis	8 August 1979 (age 47)	Right Back
14	Germany	Christian Hildebrand	23 December 1985 (age 40)	Right Winger
16	Germany	Marc Lauterbach	9 December 1990 (age 35)	Goalkeeper
17	Germany	Felix Danner	24 July 1985 (age 41)	Line Player
18	Greece	Grigorios Sanikis	29 January 1980 (age 46)	Left Back
20	Greece	Savas Karipidis	23 May 1979 (age 47)	Right Winger
21	Germany	Christian Zufelde	10 January 1988 (age 38)	Left Winger
22	Germany	Michael Allendorf	16 September 1986 (age 40)	Left Winger
23	Serbia	Nenad Vučković	23 August 1980 (age 46)	Central Back
25	Serbia	Predrag Dacevic	21 July 1986 (age 40)	Left Back
83	Romania	Alin Florin Sania	11 February 1983 (age 43)	Left Back

2010–2011 Team
Shirt No	Nationality	Player	Birth Date	Position
1	Croatia	Mario Kelentrić	31 January 1973 (age 53)	Goalkeeper
2	Belarus	Ivan Brouka	20 April 1980 (age 46)	Left Winger
3	Germany	Jens Schöngarth	7 December 1988 (age 37)	Right Back
4	Sweden	Anton Månsson	9 January 1989 (age 37)	Line Player
7	Germany	Andrej Klimovets	18 August 1974 (age 52)	Line Player
8	Germany	Michael Schweikardt	7 March 1983 (age 43)	Central Back
10	Serbia	Milan Torbica	10 April 1981 (age 45)	Right Winger
11	Greece	Dimitrios Tzimourtos	10 February 1981 (age 45)	Right Winger
12	Sweden	Robert Lechte	3 August 1978 (age 48)	Goalkeeper
15	Germany	Chris-Florian Treutler	1 January 1988 (age 38)	Central Back
16	Belarus	Vitali Feshchanka	5 January 1974 (age 52)	Goalkeeper
17	Germany	Felix Danner	24 July 1985 (age 41)	Line Player
18	Greece	Grigorios Sanikis	29 January 1980 (age 46)	Left Back
20	Greece	Savas Karipidis	23 May 1979 (age 47)	Right Winger
21	Germany	Christian Zufelde	10 January 1988 (age 38)	Left Winger
22	Germany	Michael Allendorf	16 September 1986 (age 40)	Left Winger
23	Serbia	Nenad Vučković	23 August 1980 (age 46)	Central Back
83	Romania	Alin Florin Sania	11 February 1983 (age 43)	Left Back

2009–2010 Team
Shirt No	Nationality	Player	Birth Date	Position
1	Croatia	Mario Kelentrić	31 January 1973 (age 53)	Goalkeeper
2	Belarus	Ivan Brouka	20 April 1980 (age 46)	Left Winger
3	Germany	Jens Schöngarth	7 December 1988 (age 37)	Right Back
5	France	Franck Junillon	28 November 1978 (age 47)	Left Back
7	Denmark	Thomas Klitgaard	10 December 1977 (age 48)	Line Player
8	Croatia	Dalibor Anušić	7 April 1976 (age 50)	Line Player
10	Sweden	Daniel Tellander	6 July 1983 (age 43)	Left Winger
11	Greece	Dimitrios Tzimourtos	10 February 1981 (age 45)	Right Winger
12	Germany	Simon Herold	2 February 1987 (age 39)	Goalkeeper
14	Serbia	Vladica Stojanović	14 June 1981 (age 45)	Central Back
15	Germany	Chris-Florian Treutler	1 January 1988 (age 38)	Central Back
16	Sweden	Robert Lechte	3 August 1978 (age 48)	Goalkeeper
17	Germany	Felix Danner	24 July 1985 (age 41)	Line Player
18	Greece	Grigorios Sanikis	29 January 1980 (age 46)	Left Back
20	Greece	Savas Karipidis	23 May 1979 (age 47)	Right Winger
23	Serbia	Nenad Vučković	23 August 1980 (age 46)	Central Back

2008–2009 Team
Shirt No	Nationality	Player	Birth Date	Position
1	Croatia	Mario Kelentrić	31 January 1973 (age 53)	Goalkeeper
2	Belarus	Ivan Brouka	20 April 1980 (age 46)	Left Winger
3	Germany	Torben Ehlers	27 August 1984 (age 42)	Right Back
5	France	Franck Junillon	28 November 1978 (age 47)	Left Back
6	Poland	Paweł Orzłowski	2 June 1972 (age 54)	Line Player
7	Denmark	Thomas Klitgaard	10 December 1977 (age 48)	Line Player
9	Slovakia	Daniel Valo	7 May 1979 (age 47)	Right Back
10	Sweden	Daniel Tellander	6 July 1983 (age 43)	Left Winger
11	Greece	Dimitrios Tzimourtos	10 February 1981 (age 45)	Right Winger
12	Germany	Simon Herold	2 February 1987 (age 39)	Goalkeeper
14	Serbia	Vladica Stojanović	14 June 1981 (age 45)	Central Back
15	Germany	Chris-Florian Treutler	1 January 1988 (age 38)	Central Back
18	Greece	Grigorios Sanikis	29 January 1980 (age 46)	Left Back
20	Greece	Savas Karipidis	23 May 1979 (age 47)	Right Winger
23	Serbia	Nenad Vučković	23 August 1980 (age 46)	Central Back
24	Sweden	Fabian Schomburg	12 March 1991 (age 35)	Goalkeeper

2007–2008 Team
Shirt No	Nationality	Player	Birth Date	Position
1	Croatia	Mario Kelentrić	31 January 1973 (age 53)	Goalkeeper
2	Belarus	Ivan Brouka	20 April 1980 (age 46)	Left Winger
3	Sweden	Anders Jacobson	8 May 1984 (age 42)	Left Back
5	Belarus	Andrej Kurtschew	23 April 1980 (age 46)	Right Back
6	Czech Republic	Michal Kraus	24 January 1979 (age 47)	Right Winger
7	Denmark	Thomas Klitgaard	10 December 1977 (age 48)	Line Player
8	Czech Republic	Petr Házl	29 August 1971 (age 55)	Central Back
9	Slovakia	Daniel Valo	7 May 1979 (age 47)	Right Back
10	Sweden	Daniel Tellander	6 July 1983 (age 43)	Left Winger
11	Czech Republic	Petr Hrubý	16 July 1980 (age 46)	Line Player
12	Germany	Dennis Klockmann	2 September 1982 (age 44)	Goalkeeper
14	Serbia	Vladica Stojanović	14 June 1981 (age 45)	Central Back
18	Greece	Grigorios Sanikis	29 January 1980 (age 46)	Left Back
20	Greece	Savas Karipidis	23 May 1979 (age 47)	Right Winger
22	Germany	Andreas Blank	27 May 1980 (age 46)	Left Winger
23	Serbia	Nenad Vučković	23 August 1980 (age 46)	Central Back
24	Czech Republic	Radek Musil	5 November 1973 (age 52)	Goalkeeper
26	Greece	Spyros Balomenos	28 February 1979 (age 47)	Left Back

2006–2007 Team
Shirt No	Nationality	Player	Birth Date	Position
2	Belarus	Ivan Brouka	20 April 1980 (age 46)	Left Winger
4	Germany	Karsten Wöhler	14 November 1974 (age 51)	Left Winger
5	Belarus	Andrej Kurtschew	23 April 1980 (age 46)	Right Back
6	Czech Republic	Michal Kraus	24 January 1979 (age 47)	Right Winger
7	Serbia and Montenegro	Predrag Kontic	28 September 1970 (age 56)	Right Back
8	Czech Republic	Petr Házl	29 August 1971 (age 55)	Central Back
9	Slovakia	Daniel Valo	7 May 1979 (age 47)	Right Back
10	Germany	Daniel Holl	30 September 1981 (age 45)	Left Winger
11	Czech Republic	Petr Hrubý	16 July 1980 (age 46)	Line Player
12	Serbia	Zoran Đorđić	15 October 1966 (age 60)	Goalkeeper
14	Serbia	Vladica Stojanović	14 June 1981 (age 45)	Central Back
15	Germany	Benedikt Hütt	17 July 1987 (age 39)	Left Winger
17	Croatia	Goran Šprem	6 July 1979 (age 47)	Left Winger
18	Greece	Grigorios Sanikis	29 January 1980 (age 46)	Left Back
20	Greece	Giorgos Chalkidis	12 May 1973 (age 53)	Line Player
21	Germany	Sead Kurtagic	28 October 1977 (age 49)	Right Winger
24	Czech Republic	Radek Musil	5 November 1973 (age 52)	Goalkeeper
26	Greece	Spyros Balomenos	28 February 1979 (age 47)	Left Back

2005–2006 Team
Shirt No	Nationality	Player	Birth Date	Position
2	Belarus	Ivan Brouka	20 April 1980 (age 46)	Left Winger
3	Germany	Markus Pregler	6 November 1971 (age 54)	Line Player
4	Germany	Karsten Wöhler	14 November 1974 (age 51)	Left Winger
6	Czech Republic	Michal Kraus	24 January 1979 (age 47)	Right Winger
7	Serbia and Montenegro	Predrag Kontic	28 September 1970 (age 56)	Right Back
8	Czech Republic	Petr Házl	29 August 1971 (age 55)	Central Back
9	Slovakia	Daniel Valo	7 May 1979 (age 47)	Right Back
10	Germany	Daniel Holl	30 September 1981 (age 45)	Left Winger
11	Czech Republic	Petr Hrubý	16 July 1980 (age 46)	Line Player
12	Serbia	Zoran Đorđić	15 October 1966 (age 60)	Goalkeeper
15	Germany	Benedikt Hütt	17 July 1987 (age 39)	Left Winger
17	Germany	Marcus Hock	26 March 1982 (age 44)	Left Back
18	Greece	Grigorios Sanikis	29 January 1980 (age 46)	Left Back
19	Czech Republic	Alexander Radčenko	5 July 1973 (age 53)	Central Back
21	Germany	Sead Kurtagic	28 October 1977 (age 49)	Right Winger
22	Czech Republic	Jiří Hynek	7 June 1981 (age 45)	Left Back
24	Czech Republic	Radek Musil	5 November 1973 (age 52)	Goalkeeper

== Domestic competition ==
source of information

Season	Tier	Division	Pos.	Win	Draw	Lose	Points	DHB-Pokal
2025-26	1	Handball-Bundesliga	7th	17	5	12	39	quarter-final
2024-25	1	Handball-Bundesliga	3rd	27	1	6	55	Final Four - 2nd place
2023-24	1	Handball-Bundesliga	5th	20	4	10	44	Final Four - 2nd place
2022-23	1	Handball-Bundesliga	9th	14	6	14	34	round of sixteen
2021-22	1	Handball-Bundesliga	8th	15	3	16	33	quarter-final
2020-21	1	Handball-Bundesliga	8th	19	3	16	41	Final Four - 2nd place
2019-20	1	Handball-Bundesliga	7th	15	2	9	1.230^{a}	postponed to 2020-21
2018-19	1	Handball-Bundesliga	5th	21	0	13	42	quarter-final
2017-18	1	Handball-Bundesliga	7th	19	3	12	41	round of sixteen
2016-17	1	Handball-Bundesliga	7th	18	2	14	38	quarter-final
2015-16	1	Handball-Bundesliga	4th	22	3	7	47	quarter-final
2014-15	1	Handball-Bundesliga	6th	18	4	14	40	2nd round
2013-14	1	Handball-Bundesliga	6th	18	4	12	40	Final Four - 4th place
2012-13	1	Handball-Bundesliga	10th	14	5	15	33	Final Four - 4th place
2011-12	1	Handball-Bundesliga	10th	12	6	16	30	3rd round
2010-11	1	Handball-Bundesliga	13th	9	4	21	22	quarter-final
2009-10	1	Handball-Bundesliga	12th	11	1	22	23	round of sixteen
2008-09	1	Handball-Bundesliga	11th	14	2	18	30	round of sixteen
2007-08	1	Handball-Bundesliga	10th	13	3	18	29	2nd round
2006-07	1	Handball-Bundesliga	12th	10	0	24	20	2nd round
2005-06	1	Handball-Bundesliga	12th	11	2	21	24	quarter-final
2004-05	2	2. Handball-Bundesliga Staffel Süd	1st	29	2	3	60	2nd round
2003-04	2	2. Handball-Bundesliga Staffel Süd	3rd	22	4	8	48	round of sixteen
2002-03	2	2. Handball-Bundesliga Staffel Süd	5th	21	3	10	45	2nd round
2001-02	2	2. Handball-Bundesliga Staffel Süd	5th	21	1	12	43	2nd round
2000-01	2	2. Handball-Bundesliga Staffel Süd	6th	19	5	10	43	quarter-final
1999-00	2	2. Handball-Bundesliga Staffel Süd	11th	16	2	16	34	3rd round
1998-99	2	2. Handball-Bundesliga Staffel Süd	9th	16	3	15	35	round of sixteen
1997-98	2	2. Handball-Bundesliga Staffel Süd	3rd	21	5	8	47	1st round
1996-97	2	2. Handball-Bundesliga Staffel Süd	5th	21	1	12	43	quarter-final
1995-96	2	2. Handball-Bundesliga Staffel Nord	5th	16	5	13	37	Final Four - 4th place
1994-95	2	2. Handball-Bundesliga Staffel Süd	7th	15	3	16	33	1st round
1993-94	2	2. Handball-Bundesliga Staffel Süd	6th	17	5	12	39	1st round
1992-93	2	2. Handball-Bundesliga Staffel Mitte	11th	10	1	15	21	-
1991-92	3	Regionalliga Südwest Staffel Nord	1st	21	0	1	42	-
1990-91	3	Regionalliga Südwest Staffel Nord	1st	12	7	1	31	-
1989-90	3	Regionalliga Südwest Staffel Nord	4th	13	3	6	29	-
1988-89	3	Regionalliga Südwest Staffel Nord	3rd	13	2	7	28	-
1987-88	3	Regionalliga Südwest Staffel Nord	5th	10	1	11	21	-
1986-87	4	Oberliga Hessen Staffel Nord	1st	17	3	6	37	-
1985-86	4	Oberliga Hessen Staffel Nord	4th	16	3	7	35	-

^{a}Due to the COVID-19 pandemic, the season was abandoned after the 27th matchday. The final standings were determined based on points per game.

== Accomplishments ==
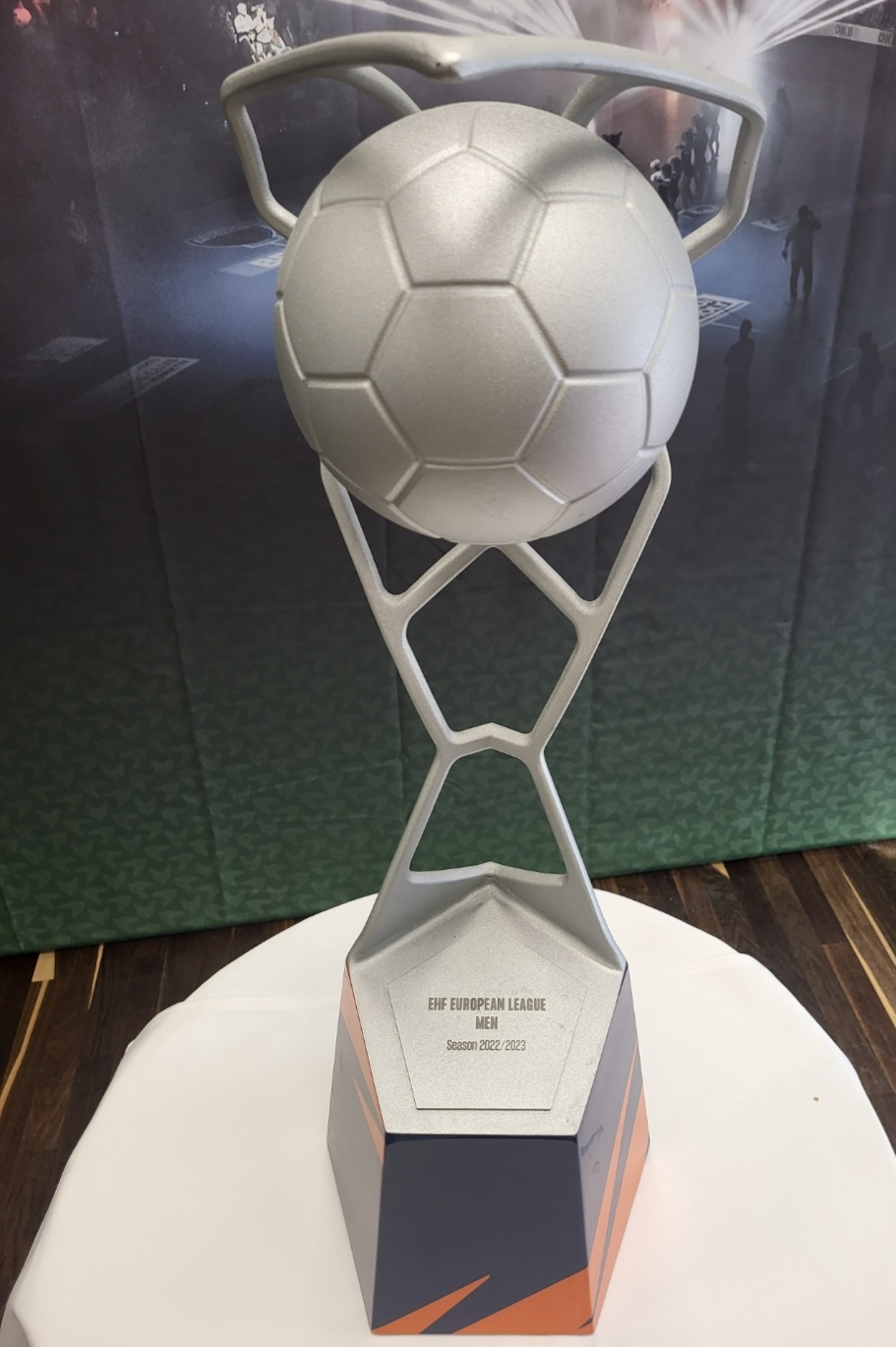
EHF European League Trophy

=== Domestic ===
- Handball-Bundesliga:
  - Bronze: 2025
- DHB-Pokal:
  - Silver: 2020, 2024, 2025
  - Final Four appearances: 1996, 2013, 2014, 2020, 2024, 2025
- 2. Handball-Bundesliga:
  - Gold: 2005

=== International ===
- EHF European League:
  - Gold: 2026
  - Final Four appearances: 2025, 2026

=== Awards ===
Awards received by players while playing for the club

Handball-Bundesliga top scorer

- (Greece) Savas Karipidis: 2009, 282 goals

HBL All-Star Team

- (Serbia) Vladica Stojanović: 2008
- (Croatia) Mario Kelentrić: 2009 2010
- (Greece) Savas Karipidis: 2009
- (Greece) Alexandros Vasilakis: 2012
- (Sweden) Mikael Appelgren: 2014 2015
- (Germany) Johannes Sellin: 2014 2015 2016
- (Germany) Michael Müller: 2015
- (Croatia) Marino Marić: 2016 2020
- (Germany) Tobias Reichmann: 2020

HBL Player of the Month

- (Germany) Julius Kühn: February 2018

EHF European League top scorer

- (Spain) Ian Barrufet: 2025, 90 goals

EHF Excellence Award – Best Young Player (Men)

- (Spain) Ian Barrufet: 2025

EHF European League Finals MVP

- (Montenegro) Nebojša Simić: 2026

== EHF Ranking ==
The European Handball Federation has introduced a club ranking in the men's and women's EHF club competitions. Clubs are ranked according to their achievements, respectively the collected points in the previous three European cup seasons (currently 2025/26, 2024/25, 2023/24).

As of 24 June 2026

Rank	Team	Points
10	Sporting Clube de Portugal	294
11	(Hungary) OTP Bank - PICK Szeged	292
12	(France) PSG Handball	275
13	(Poland) Industria Kielce	272
14	(Germany) MT Melsungen	236
15	(Poland) Orlen Wisla Plock	236
16	(Denmark) GOG	219
17	(Romania) Dinamo Bucuresti	196
18	(Portugal) FC Porto	167
19	(Croatia) HC Zagreb	140

== Former club members ==
=== Notable former players ===
- (Germany) Michael Allendorf (2010-2022)
- (Germany) Felix Danner (2009-2021 + 03/2025-04/2025)
- (Germany) Johannes Golla (2015-2018 + 2026-)
- (Germany) Heiko Grimm (2015)
- (Germany) Kai Häfner (2019-2023)
- (Germany) Silvio Heinevetter (2020-2022)
- (Germany) Timo Kastening (2020-)
- (Germany) (Belarus) Andrej Klimovets (2010-2011)
- (Germany) Yves Kunkel (2018-2022)
- (Germany) Julius Kühn (2017-2024)
- (Germany) Finn Lemke (2017-2023)
- (Germany) Michael Müller (2013-2019)
- (Germany) Philipp Müller (2013-2019)
- (Germany) Tobias Reichmann (2017-2022)
- (Germany) Timm Schneider (2015-2020)
- (Germany) Jens Schöngarth (2009-2012)
- (Germany) Johannes Sellin (2013-2017)
- (Austria) Harald Beilschmied (2001-2004)
- (Bosnia and Herzegovina) (Croatia) Dalibor Anušić (2009-2010)
- (Belarus) Ivan Brouka (2005-2011)
- (Belarus) Vitali Feshchanka (2011)
- (Belarus) Andrej Kurchev (2006-2008)
- (Croatia) Mario Kelentrić (2007-2012)
- (Croatia) David Mandić (2022-)
- (Croatia) Marino Marić (2014-2022)
- (Croatia) Ivan Martinović (2022-2024)
- (Croatia) Domagoj Pavlović (2018-2024)
- (Croatia) Goran Šprem (2006)
- (Czech Republic) Petr Házl (2004-2008)
- (Czech Republic) Petr Hrubý (2004-2008)
- (Czech Republic) Jiří Hynek (2005-2006)
- (Czech Republic) Daniel Kubeš (2012-2014)
- (Czech Republic) Michal Kraus (2004-2008)
- (Czech Republic) Radek Musil (2004-2008)
- (Denmark) Thomas Klitgaard (2007-2010)
- (Denmark) Lasse Mikkelsen (2017-2021)
- (Denmark) René Villadsen (2015-2017)
- (Estonia) Dener Jaanimaa (2016-2018)
- (France) Franck Junillon (2008-2010)
- (Greece) Spyros Balomenos (2006–2008)
- (Greece) Giorgos Chalkidis (2006–2007)
- (Greece) Savas Karipidis (2007–2013)
- (Greece) Grigorios Sanikis (2005–2013)
- (Greece) Dimitrios Tzimourtos (2008–2010)
- (Greece) Alexandros Vasilakis (2009-2013)
- (Iceland) Arnar Freyr Arnarsson (2020-2026)
- (Iceland) Elvar Örn Jónsson (2021-2025)
- (Latvia) (Iceland) Alexander Petersson (2021-2022)
- (Montenegro) Nebojša Simić (2017-)
- (Netherlands) Jeffrey Boomhouwer (2014-2018)
- (Netherlands) Arjan Haenen (2016–2018)
- (Poland) Adam Morawski (2022-2025)
- (Poland) Paweł Orzłowski (2008–2009)
- (Portugal) André Gomes (2021-2023)
- (Russia) Gleb Kalarash (2021-2023)
- (Russia) Andrej Lavrov (2004-2005)
- (Serbia) Zoran Đorđić (2005-2007)
- (Serbia) Momir Rnić (2014-2017)
- (Serbia) Vladica Stojanović (2006-2010)
- (Serbia) Milan Torbica (2010-2011)
- (Serbia) Svetislav Verkić (2016-2017)
- (Serbia) Nenad Vučković (2008-2017)
- (Switzerland) Roman Sidorowicz (2018-2020)
- (Slovakia) Daniel Valo (2005–2009)
- (Spain) Ian Barrufet (2024-2025)
- (Sweden) Mikael Appelgren (2012-2015)
- (Sweden) Patrik Fahlgren (2011-2017)
- (Sweden) Anton Månsson (2010–2014)
- (Sweden) Per Sandström (2011-2015)
- (Sweden) Johan Sjöstrand (2015-2020)
- (Sweden) Jonathan Stenbäcken (2012-2014)
- (Sweden) Daniel Tellander (2007-2010)

=== Former coaches ===
Seasons	Coach	Country
2000–2004	Hrvoje Horvat	(Croatia) (Germany)
2004–2006	Rastislav Trtík †	(Czech Republic)
2006-2009	Robert Hedin	(Sweden)
2009-2010	Ryan Zinglersen	(Denmark)
2010	Matjaz Tominiec	(Slovenia)
2010-2018	Michael Roth	(Germany)
2018-2020	Heiko Grimm	(Germany)
2020–2021	Guðmundur Guðmundsson	(Iceland)
2021–2027	Roberto García Parrondo	(Spain)
2027	Jaron Siewert	(Germany)

== Junior Team ==
MT Melsungen's youth development programme operates under the name MT Talents. From the U15 age group upwards, the teams compete as mJSG Melsungen/Körle/Guxhagen, a joint youth organisation involving MT Melsungen, TSV Körle and TuSpo Guxhagen.

The youth programme covers several age groups and is designed to develop players progressively towards senior handball. In 2022, the club announced a restructuring of its youth development programme, extending its structured development work to younger age groups from the E-youth level upwards and aiming to establish a continuous pathway between the different age groups.

The programme has produced several successful youth teams at national level. The B-youth team won the German championship in 2019. In 2021, the B-youth again reached the national championship Final Four, finishing third after a 29–30 semi-final defeat against the Rhein-Neckar Löwen and a 22–29 loss to TSV Bayer Dormagen in the third-place match.

The A-youth team has also regularly competed at the highest levels of German youth handball. In the 2022–23 season, the team finished second in the preliminary round of the A-Jugend-Bundesliga and qualified for the championship round.

For the 2026–27 season, the mJSG Melsungen/Körle/Guxhagen A-youth team competes in the second division of the A-Jugend-Bundesliga, South group, while the B-youth team competes in the national A-Jugend-Bundesliga's B-youth competition.

The youth programme also serves as a pathway into the professional squad. Players from the MT Talents have progressed into the Bundesliga team, with the club regularly integrating promising young players into training and development squads.

The MT Talents programme has also produced several players who went on to establish themselves in the Bundesliga. Johannes Golla, who joined the MT youth system in 2015, progressed from the A-youth team directly into the professional squad and later became captain of the German national team. He returned to Melsungen in 2026 after eight seasons with SG Flensburg-Handewitt.

Other Bundesliga players developed through the Melsungen youth system include Florian Drosten, who joined the club in 2019, progressed through the C-, B- and A-youth teams and signed his first professional contract in 2022, and Dimitri Ignatow, who came through the MT youth teams before making his Bundesliga debut for the club.

Ole Pregler is another prominent graduate of the programme. He progressed through all MT youth age groups, won the German B-youth championship in 2019 and made his professional debut for Melsungen before moving to VfL Gummersbach. After establishing himself in the Bundesliga with Gummersbach, he joined Frisch Auf Göppingen in 2026.

- Head of Junior Staff and Development Team: (Germany) Finn Lemke
- A-Jugend (U19)
  - 2. Jugend-Bundesliga Süd
- B-Jugend (U17)
  - Jugend-Bundesliga Handball männliche B-Jugend (JBLH mB)
- C-Jugend (U15)
  - Regionalliga Hessen

== Mascot ==
The mascot of MT Melsungen's Bundesliga team is a dragon named Henner. His official "birthday" is 11 November 2009, when the club introduced the character as its new mascot. The name was chosen from suggestions submitted by fans and selected by a random draw. "Henner" is a North Hessian diminutive of Heinrich. The choice of a dragon was connected to the team's slogan at the time, "Feuer und Flamme für die MT" ("On Fire for MT").

Since his introduction, Henner has become a regular presence at MT Melsungen's home matches and club events. He supports the team during home games and represents the club at promotional appearances, social and community events, as well as other public activities. Henner also appears at sporting events outside the club, including the Kassel Marathon, and takes part in activities aimed at bringing the team closer to its supporters and the wider community.

The identity of the person portraying Henner has traditionally been kept confidential.
