= Olle Forsell Schefvert =

Swedish handball player (born 1993)

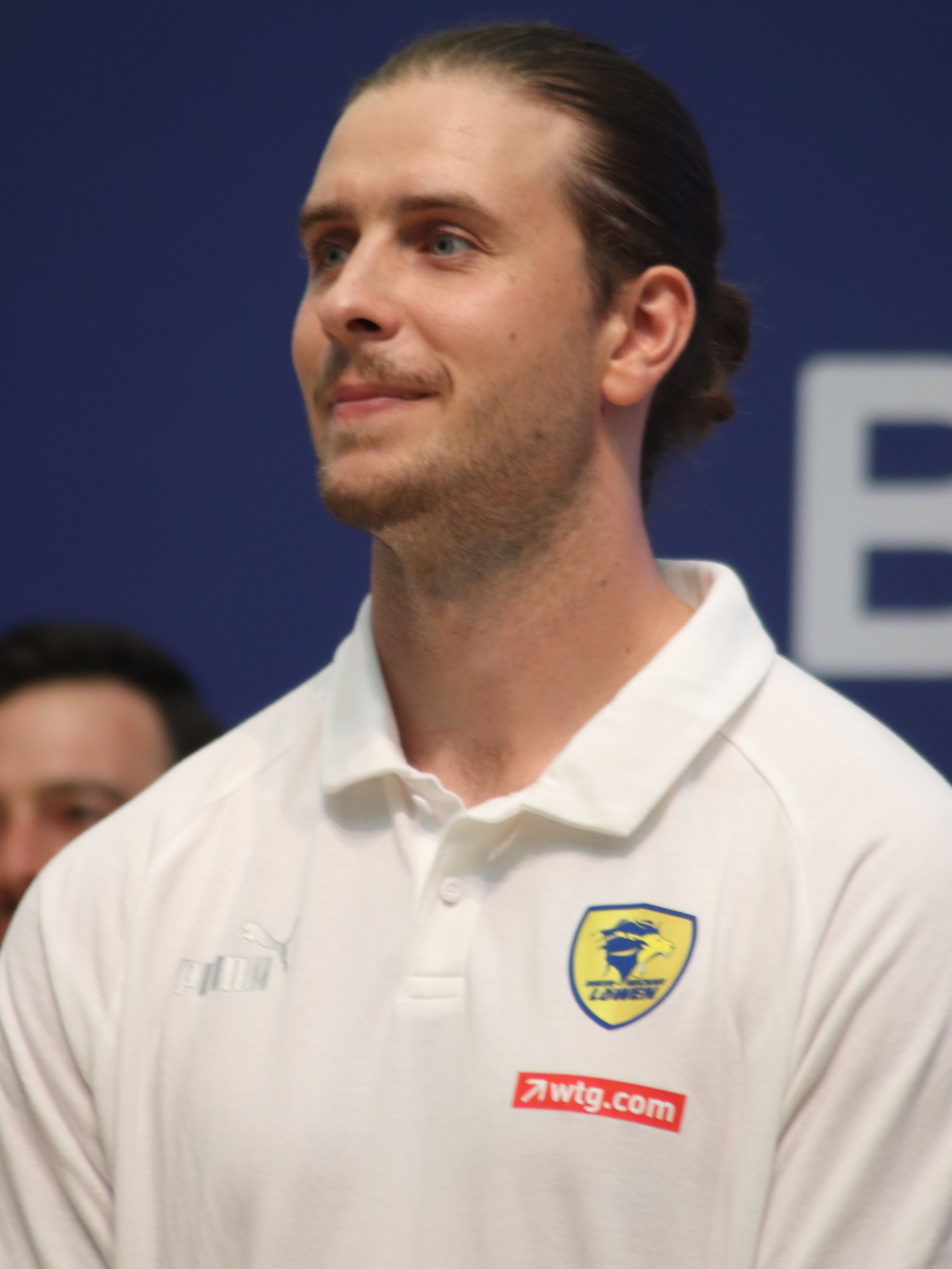

Personal information
- Full name: Olle Håkan Forsell Schefvert
- Nationality: Swedish
- Born: 13 August 1993 (age 33) Halmstad, Sweden
- Height: 1.96 m (6 ft 5 in)

Sport
- Sport: Handball
- Position: Left back
- Current club: Rhein-Neckar Löwen
- Number: 25

Senior clubs
- Years: Team
- 2012–2017: IK Sävehof
- 2017–2022: HSG Wetzlar
- 2022–2025: Rhein-Neckar Löwen
- 2025–: MT Melsungen
National team
Years	Team	Apps	(Gls)
2023–	Sweden	13	(7)
Medal record
Junior World Championship
Gold medal – first place	2013 Bosnia and Herzegovina
- Updated on 5 February 2025

Olle Forsell Schefvert (born 13 August 1993) is a Swedish handball player for MT Melsungen and the Swedish national team.

He was part of the Swedish squad that won gold medal at the 2013 Junior World Championship. He represented Sweden at the 2023 World Championship. He was not initially part of the team, but was called in to replace the injured Karl Wallinius. With Sweden he finished 4th in the tournament, losing the semifinal to France and the third place playoff to Spain.
