= Lasse Mikkelsen (handballer) =

Danish handball player (born 1988)

Personal information
- Nationality: Danish
- Born: 19 May 1988 (age 38) Dronninglund, Denmark
- Height: 1.97 m (6 ft 5 1/2 in)

Sport
- Sport: Handball
- Position: Centre back
- Current club: Skjern Håndbold
- Number: 15

Senior clubs
- Years: Team
- 2009–2011: KIF Kolding
- 2011–2017: Skjern Håndbold
- 2017–2021: MT Melsungen
- 2021–: Skjern Håndbold
National team
Years	Team	Apps	(Gls)
2015–	Denmark	4	(23)
- Updated on 19 April 2025

Lasse Mikkelsen (born 19 May 1988) is a Danish handball player for Skjern Håndbold and the Danish national team.

In the 2013/2014 and 2015/2016 seasons he won the Danish Cup with Skjern Håndbold. In the first of them he was named MVP for the tournament. In the 2021–2022 season he scored the second most goals in the Danish league with 211 goals, only surpassed by Jerry Tollbring.
