= Michael Allendorf =

German handball player (born 1986)

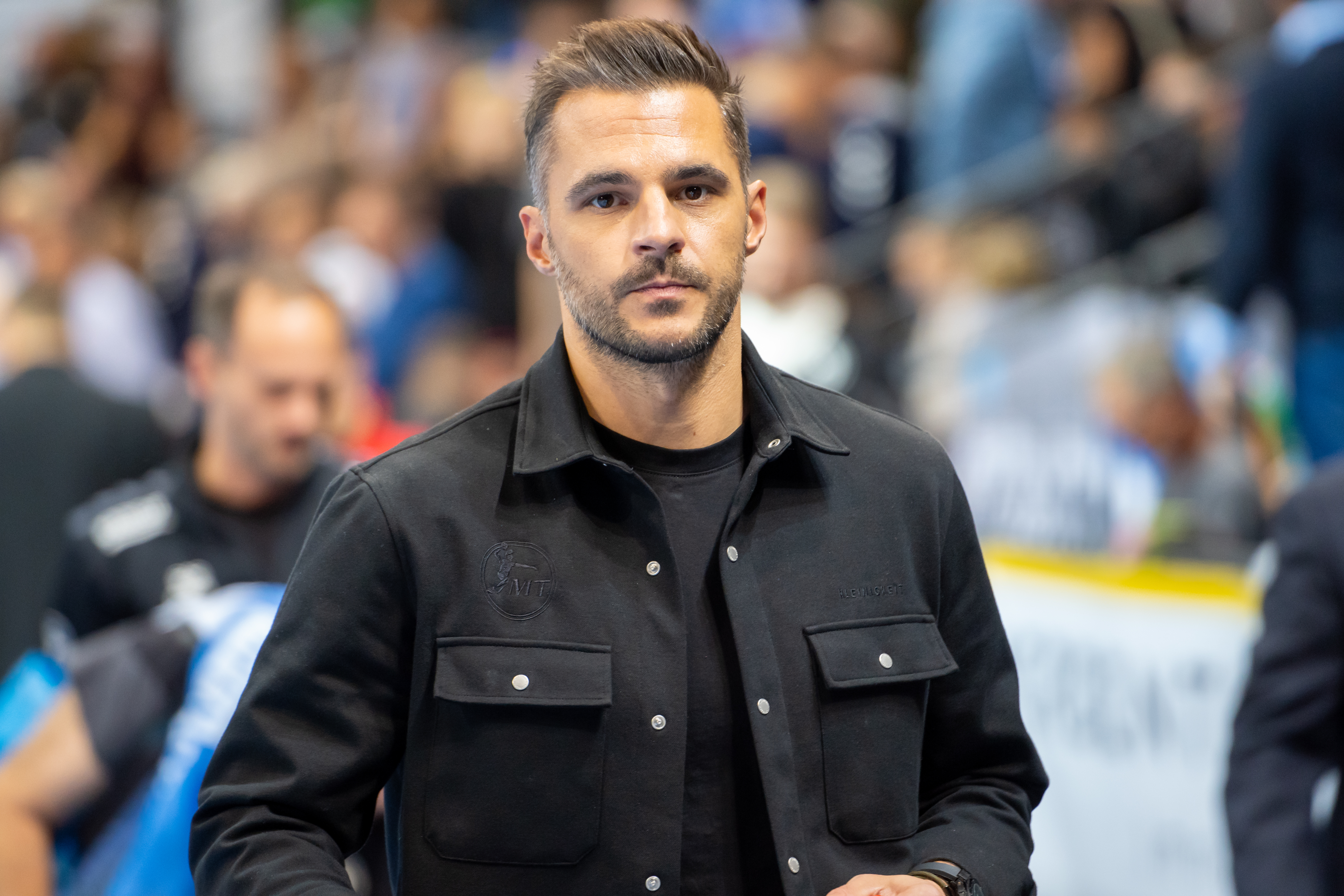
- 2024

Personal information
- Nationality: German
- Born: 16 September 1986 (age 40) Heppenheim, Germany
- Height: 1.90 m (6 ft 3 in)

Sport
- Sport: Handball
- Position: Left wing
- Current club: MT Melsungen
- Number: 22

Senior clubs
- Years: Team
- 2004–2006: SG Wallau-Massenheim
- 2006–2010: HSG Wetzlar
- 2010–2022: MT Melsungen
National team
Years	Team	Apps	(Gls)
2007–2015	Germany	17	(26)

Michael Allendorf (born 16 September 1986) is a German former handball player for MT Melsungen and the German national team.
