= Ivan Brouka =

Belarusian handball player

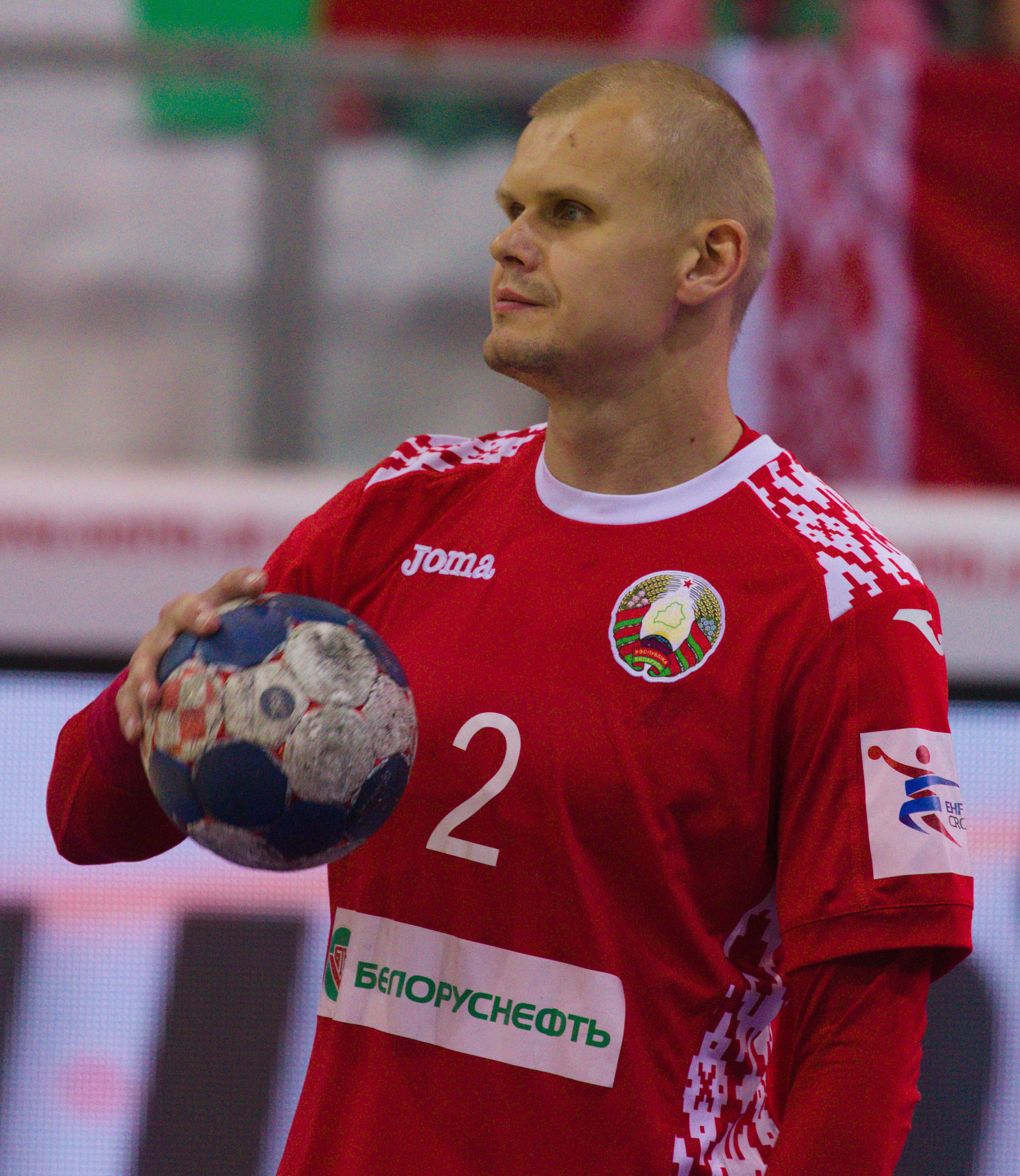

Personal information
- Nationality: Belarusian
- Born: 20 April 1980 (age 46) Minsk, Belarus
- Height: 1.85 m (6 ft 1 in)

Sport
- Sport: Handball
- Position: Left wing
- Current club: Retiring
- Number: 80
National team
Years	Team	Apps	(Gls)
–	Belarus	207	(607)
- Updated on 17 May 2020

Ivan Brouka (born 20 April 1980) is a Belarusian former handball player who for the Belarusian national team.

During his career he played for SKA Minsk and Dynamo Minsk in his home country, STR Saporischschja in Ukraine and MT Melsungen in Germany.
