= Giorgos Chalkidis =

Greek handball player (born 1977)

Georgios Chalkidis
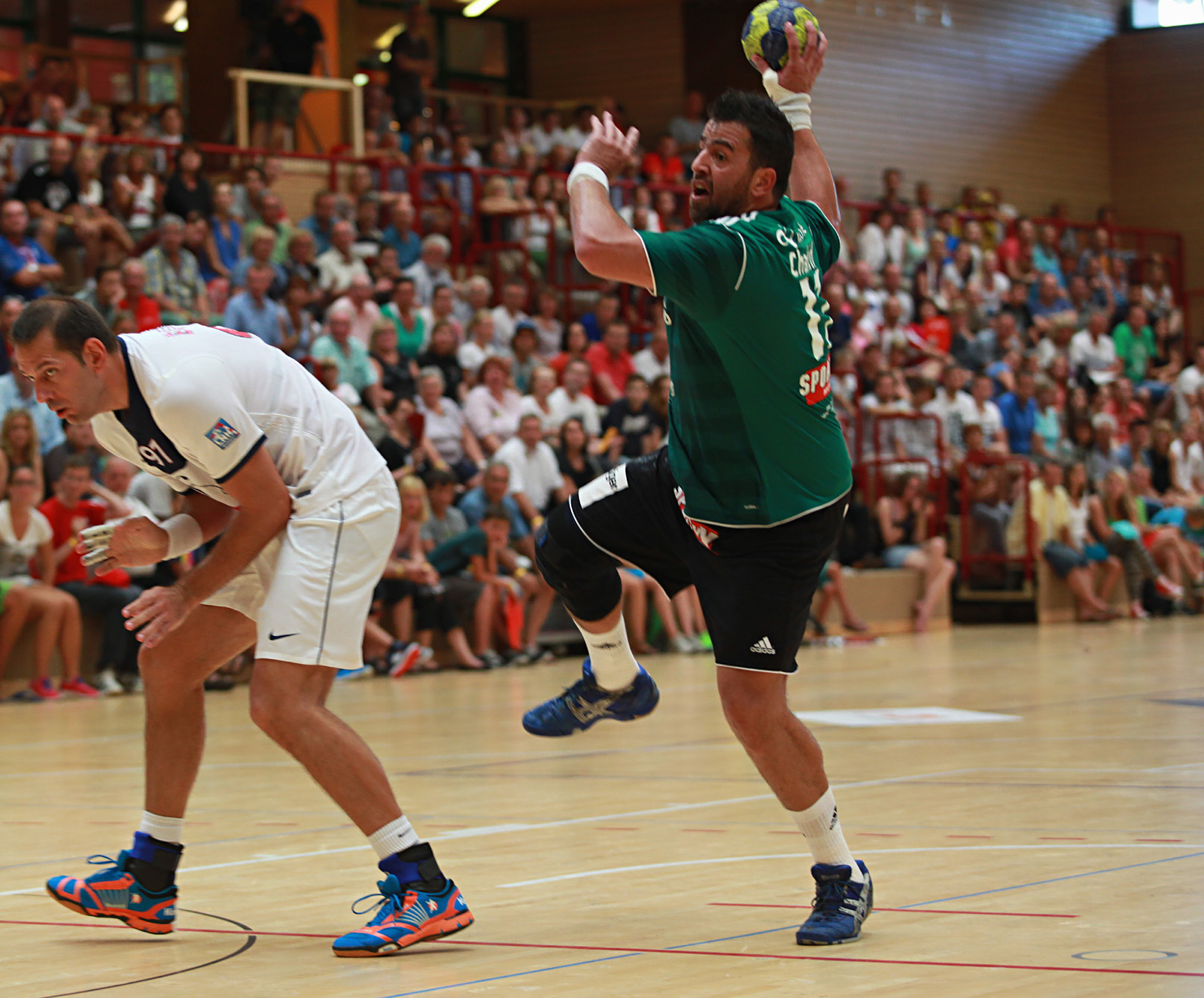
- Chalkidis in 2013

Personal information
- Nationality: Greece
- Born: 13 May 1977 (age 49) Ptolemaida, Greece
- Height: 1.96 m (6 ft 5 in)

Sport
- Sport: Handball
- Position: pivot

Senior clubs
- Years: Team
- 1993–1994: Arionas Ptolemaidas
- 1994–1995: Olympiakos Keratsiniou
- 1995–2004: Panellinios
- 2004–2006: Teka Cantabria Santander
- 2006–2007: MT Melsungen
- 2007–2012: HSG Wetzlar
- 2012–2016: Wacker Thun
National team
Years	Team	Apps
1997–2014	Greece	240

Georgios Chalkidis (Greek: Γιώργος Χαλκίδης, also transliterated Giorgos Khalkidis, born 13 May 1977) is a retired Greek male handball player. He was a member of the Greece men's national handball team, playing as a pivot. He was a part of the team at the 2004 Summer Olympics and at the 2005 World Championship.
