= Alexandros Vasilakis =

Greek handball player (born 1979)

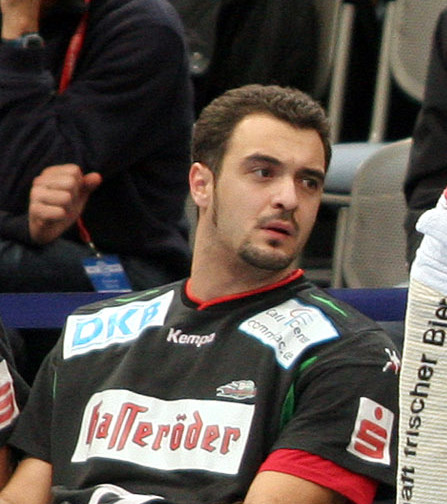
- Alexandros Vasilakis

Personal information
- Nationality: Greece
- Born: 8 August 1979 (age 47) Corfu, Greece
- Height: 1.98 m (6 ft 6 in)

Sport
- Sport: Handball
- Position: right back

Senior clubs
- Years: Team
- –2003: ASE Douka
- 2003–2005: Wilhelmshavener HV
- 2005–2007: HSG Düsseldorf
- 2007–2009: SC Magdeburg
- 2009–2013: MT Melsungen
- 2013: Fenix Toulouse Handball
- 2013–2014: Pays d'Aix Université Club
- 2014: Al-Quiyada
- 2014–2016: HBW Balingen-Weilstetten
- 2016–2019: Handball Esch
National team
Years	Team	Apps
–	Greece	139

Alexandros Vasilakis (Greek: Αλέξανδρος Βασιλάκης; born 8 August 1979) is a retired Greek handball player. He was a member of the Greece men's national handball team, playing as a right back. He was a part of the team at the 2004 Summer Olympics.
