= Adam Morawski =

Polish handball player (born 1994)

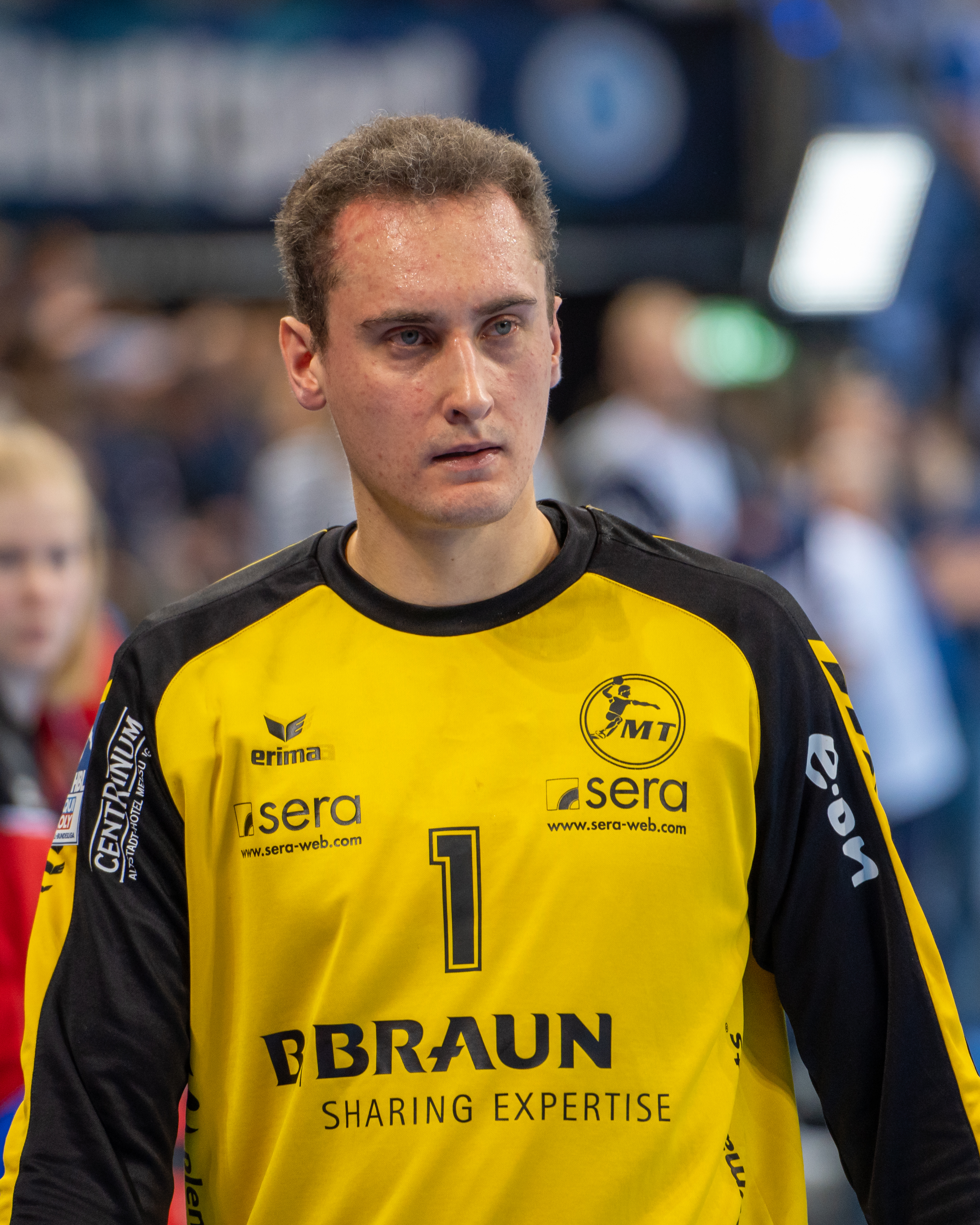

Personal information
- Nationality: Polish
- Born: 17 October 1994 (age 32) Ciechanów, Poland
- Height: 1.90 m (6 ft 3 in)

Sport
- Sport: Handball
- Position: Goalkeeper
- Current club: Industria Kielce
- Number: 1

Youth career
- Years: Team
- –2010: Czarni Regimin

Senior clubs
- Years: Team
- 2010–2013: SMS Gdańsk
- 2013–2022: Wisła Płock
- 2015–2016: → Pogoń Szczecin (loan)
- 2022–2025: MT Melsungen
- 2025–: Industria Kielce
National team
Years	Team	Apps	(Gls)
2013–	Poland	89	(6)
- Updated on 12 July 2025

Adam Morawski (born 17 October 1994) is a Polish handball goalkeeper for Industria Kielce and the Polish national handball team.

He made his debut for the Polish national team on 4 June 2013 against Sweden. He participated at the 2017 and 2025 World Championships as well as the 2020 European Men's Handball Championship.
