= Roman Sidorowicz =

Swiss handball player

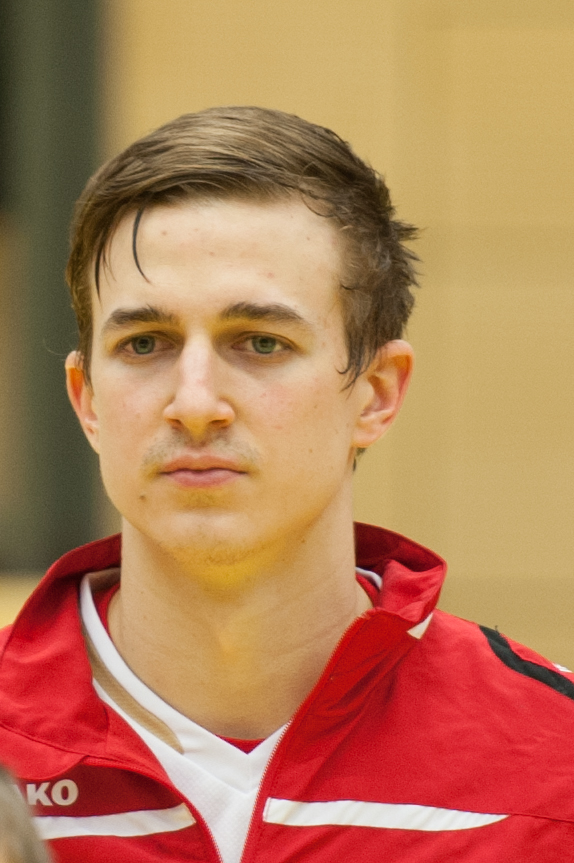

Personal information
- Nationality: Swiss
- Born: 8 August 1991 (age 35) Horgen, Switzerland
- Height: 1.87 m (6 ft 2 in)

Sport
- Sport: Handball
- Position: Left back
- Current club: SG Wädenswil/Horgen
- Number: 27

Senior clubs
- Years: Team
- –2006: HC Horgen
- 2006–2010: ZMC Amicitia Zürich
- 2010–2014: GC Amicitia Zürich
- 2014–2018: Pfadi Winterthur
- 2018–2020: MT Melsungen
- 2020–2022: Pfadi Winterthur
National team
Years	Team	Apps	(Gls)
2014–2022	Switzerland	76	(171)

Roman Sidorowicz (born 8 August 1991) is a Swiss former handball player for SG Wädenswil/Horgen and the Swiss national team.

He represented Switzerland at the 2020 European Men's Handball Championship.

His father is Polish, his mother Dutch.
