= Robert Lechte =

Swedish handball player (born 1978)

Personal information
- Full name: Robert Lechte
- Nationality: Swedish (Sweden)
- Born: August 3, 1978 (age 48) Tibro, Sweden
- Height: 195 cm (77 in)

Sport
- Sport: Handball
- Position: Goalkeeper
- Current club: Aarhus GF
- Number: 12

Youth career
- Years: Team
- –: HP Tibro

Senior clubs
- Years: Team
- 1996–2003: IFK Skövde
- 2003–2005: CD Bidasoa
- 2005–2006: IF Guif
- 2006–2009: AGF
- 2009–2011: MT Melsungen
- 2011–2012: Viking HK
- 2012–2016: IFK Skövde
National team
Years	Team	Apps	(Gls)
2001–2002	Sweden	7	(0)

Robert Lechte (born August 3, 1978) is a Swedish former handballer.

He played for Danish Handball League side Aarhus GF from 2006 to 2009, having previously played for IFK Skövde and IF Guif in the top division of Sweden. He then joined German MT Melsungen until 2011 and Norwegian Viking HK in the 2011-12 season. Lastly, he returned to IFK Skövde, where he played for four years before retiring.

Lechte has made 7 appearances for the Swedish national handball team.

After retering he became the coach of his childhood club, HP Tibro.
