= Dimitrios Tzimourtos =

Greek handball player (born 1981)

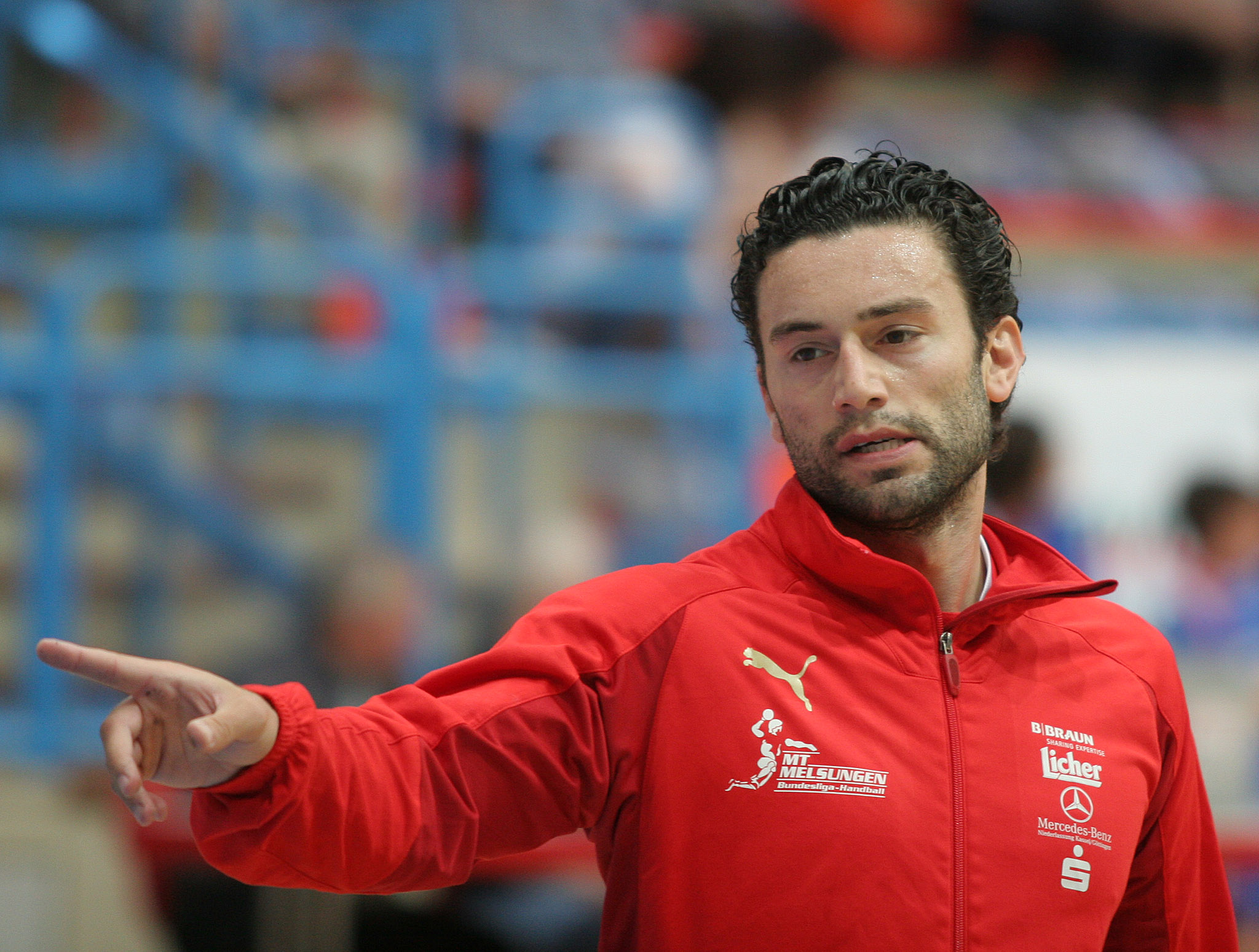

Personal information
- Nationality: Greek
- Born: 10 February 1981 (age 45) Veroia, Greece
- Height: 172 cm (68 in)

Sport
- Sport: Handball
- Position: Right wing

Senior clubs
- Years: Team
- -2007: Filippos Veria H.C.
- 2007-2008: Eintracht Hildesheim
- 2008-2010: MT Melsungen
- 2010-2015: Eintracht Hildesheim
National team
Years	Team	Apps
–	Greece	132

Dimitrios Tzimourtos (Greek: Δημήτριος Τζιμούρτος, born 10 February 1981) is a Greek handball player as a right wing. He competed in the men's handball tournament at the 2004 Summer Olympics.
