= Philipp Müller (handballer) =

German handball player (born 1984)

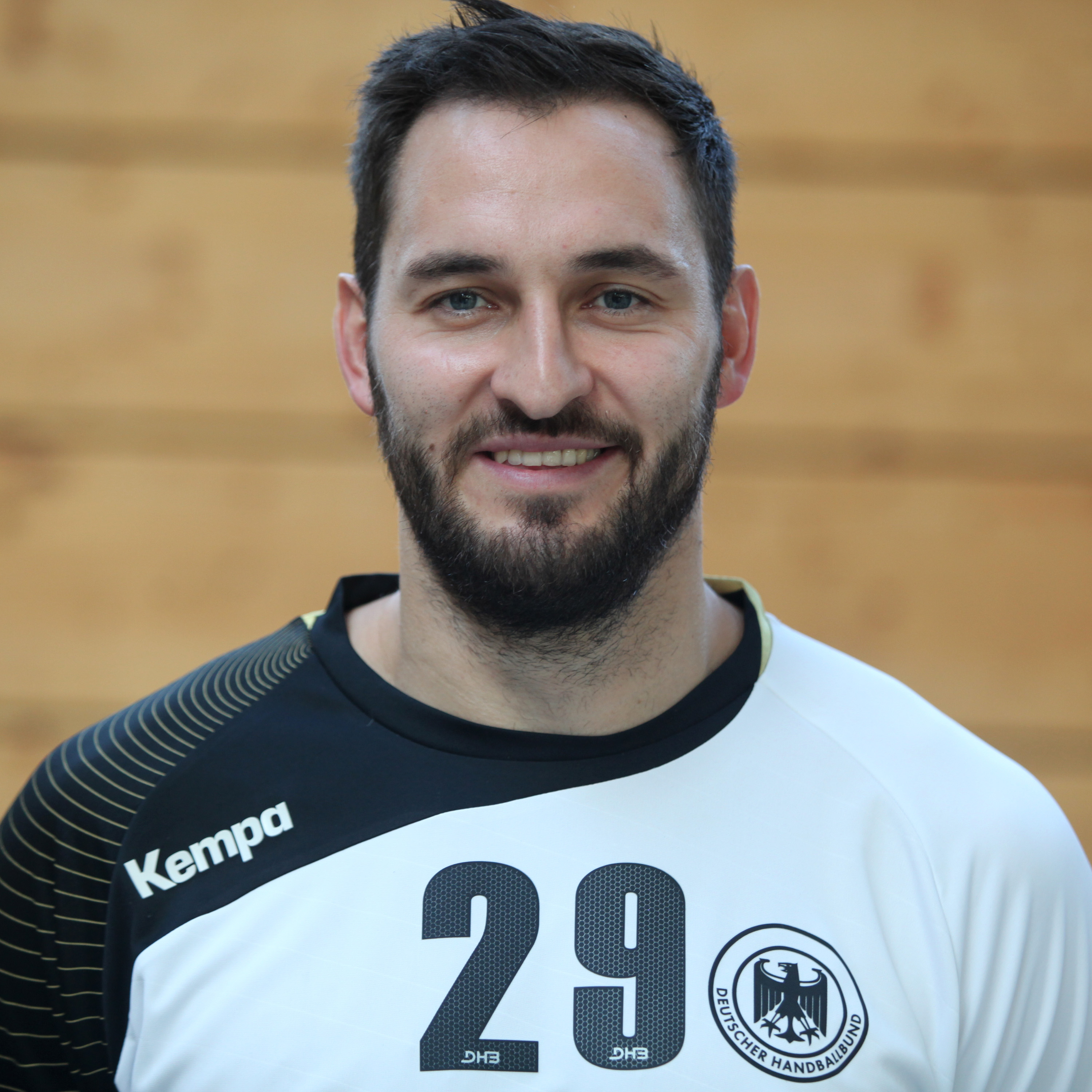

Personal information
- Nationality: German
- Born: 14 September 1984 (age 42) Bayreuth, Germany
- Height: 1.97 m (6 ft 6 in)

Sport
- Sport: Handball
- Position: Left back
- Current club: Retiring
- Number: 18

Senior clubs
- Years: Team
- –2006: HaSpo Bayreuth
- 2006–2007: TUSPO Obernburg
- 2006–2008: TV Großwallstadt
- 2008–2010: HBW Balingen-Weilstetten
- 2010–2013: HSG Wetzlar
- 2013–?: MT Melsungen
- ?-2020: SC DHfK Leipzig Handball
National team
Years	Team	Apps	(Gls)
2014–2020	Germany	2	(0)

Philipp Müller (born 14 September 1984) is a German handball player for MT Melsungen and the German national team.
