= Nikolaj Enderleit =

Danish handball player (born 1997)

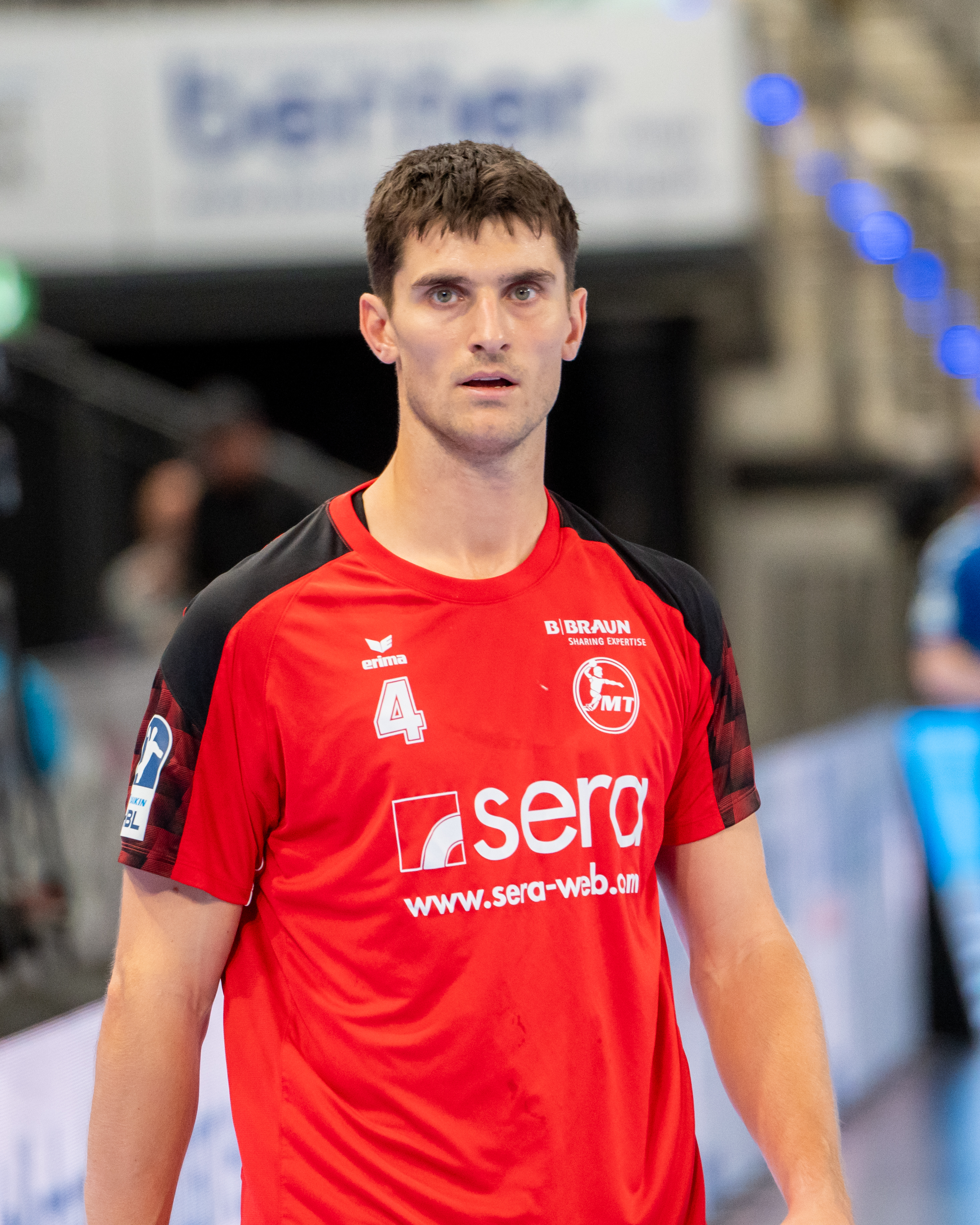

Personal information
- Full name: Nikolaj Enderleit
- Born: 21 June 1997 (age 29) Kolding, Denmark
- Height: 1.97 m (6 ft 6 in)

Sport
- Sport: Handball
- Position: Right back
- Current club: MT Melsungen
- Number: 4

Youth career
- Years: Team
- –: KIF Kolding

Senior clubs
- Years: Team
- 2014–2017: KIF Kolding
- 2017–2019: Ribe-Esbjerg HH
- 2019–2024: TTH Holstebro
- 2024–: MT Melsungen

Nikolaj Enderleit (born 21 June 1997) is a Danish handball player for MT Melsungen.

== Career ==
Enderleit started his career at KIF Kolding. After a single season at TM Tønder he joined Ribe-Esbjerg HH in 2017. In 2019 he joined TTH Holstebro.

Enderleit was signed by MT Melsungen in 2024 to replace Ivan Martinović, who was leaving to join Rhein-Neckar Löwen, on a contract until 2025. As he has never represented Denmark internationally, he said the move would help him achieve that goal.
