= Rastislav Trtík =

Czech handball coach (1961-2024)

Personal information
- Born: 6 March 1961; Košice, Czechoslovakia
- Died: 1 October 2024 (aged 63)
- Nationality: Czech

Rastislav Trtík (6 March 1961 – 1 October 2024) was a Czech handball player and coach. As a player, he won the Czechoslovak championship. As a coach he won Czech and Slovak championships and coached the Czech national handball team.

== Biography ==
=== Early life ===
Rastislav Trtík was born on 6 March 1961 in Košice.

=== Playing career ===
As a handball player, Trtík developed in the team VSŽ Košice, for which he played in all junior categories as well as the senior team, with which he won the Czechoslovak championship. At the age of 19, he moved to Ostrava, where he studied at the university and played for Baník Ostrava and Baník Karviná. He also represented Czechoslovakia at international competitions. After the Dissolution of Czechoslovakia, he opted for the Czech citizenship.

=== Coaching career ===
Trtík's first coaching job was at Baník Karviná, which he coached from 1994 to 1997. Under his leadership, the team placed second twice in the Czech league. Between 1997 and 2003 he coached SKP Frýdek-Místek team. In his final year, he led the club to the first victory in the Czech league in its history. From 2004 to 2006, he coached the German team MT Melsungen, which he led to promotion to the first German league. In addition, he parallelly coached the Czech national team. In 2008, he again coached Karviná, leading it to the league title. From 2008 to 2011, he coached HT Tatran Prešov, leading it to three league championships in a row. Following stints with Karviná (2011-2012) and HC Empor Rostock (2012-2014), he returned to Prešov, which he led to two more league victories in 2016 and 2017. From 2017 to 2019 he led the Polish team Górnik Zabrze.

His final professional coaching job was with the Czech national team from 2021 to 2022. In the final years, Trtík suffered from health problems, which limited him to coaching junior teams.

== Death ==
Rastislav Trtík died on 1 October 2024 at the age of 63 after a long illness.
