= Savvas Karypidis =

Greek handball player (born 1979)

Savvas Karipidis
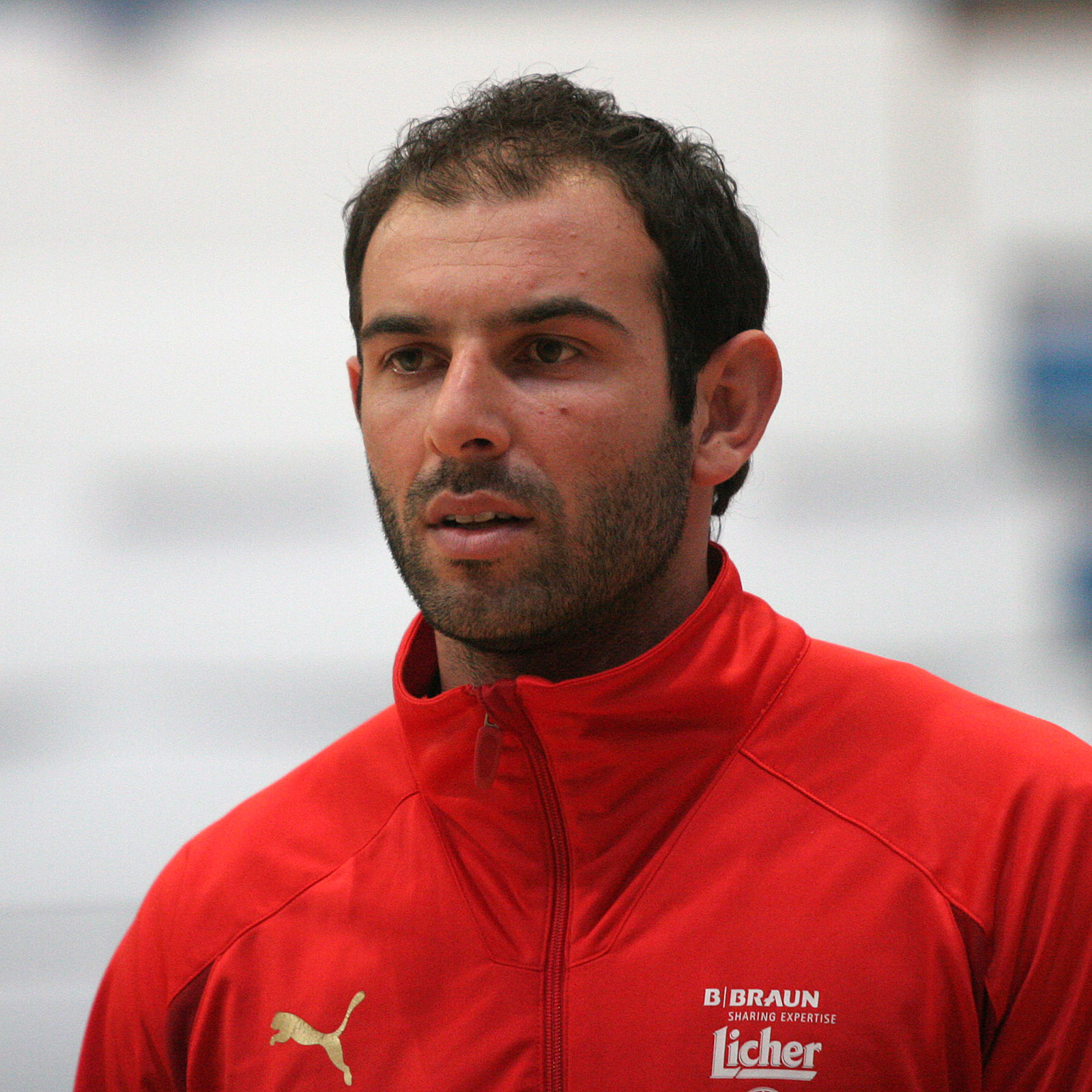

Personal information
- Nationality: Greece
- Born: 23 May 1979 (age 47) Katerini, Greece
- Height: 1.83 m (6 ft 0 in)

Sport
- Sport: Handball
- Position: right wing

Senior clubs
- Years: Team
- 1997–2001: Archelaos Katerinis
- 2001–2003: Panellinios
- 2003–2005: Filippos Verias
- 2005: Kadetten Schaffhausen
- 2005–2007: HSG Wetzlar
- 2007–2013: MT Melsungen
- 2013–2014: AEK Athens
- 2014–2015: Archelaos Katerinis
- 2015–2017: Filippos Verias
National team
Years	Team	Apps	(Gls)
1999–2014	Greece	202	(930)

Savvas Karipidis (Greek: Σάββας Καρυπίδης; born 23 May 1979) is a retired Greek male handball player. He was a member of the Greece men's national handball team, playing as a right wing. He was a part of the team at the 2004 Summer Olympics and at the 2005 World Men's Handball Championship.
