= Felix Danner =

German handball player (born 1985)

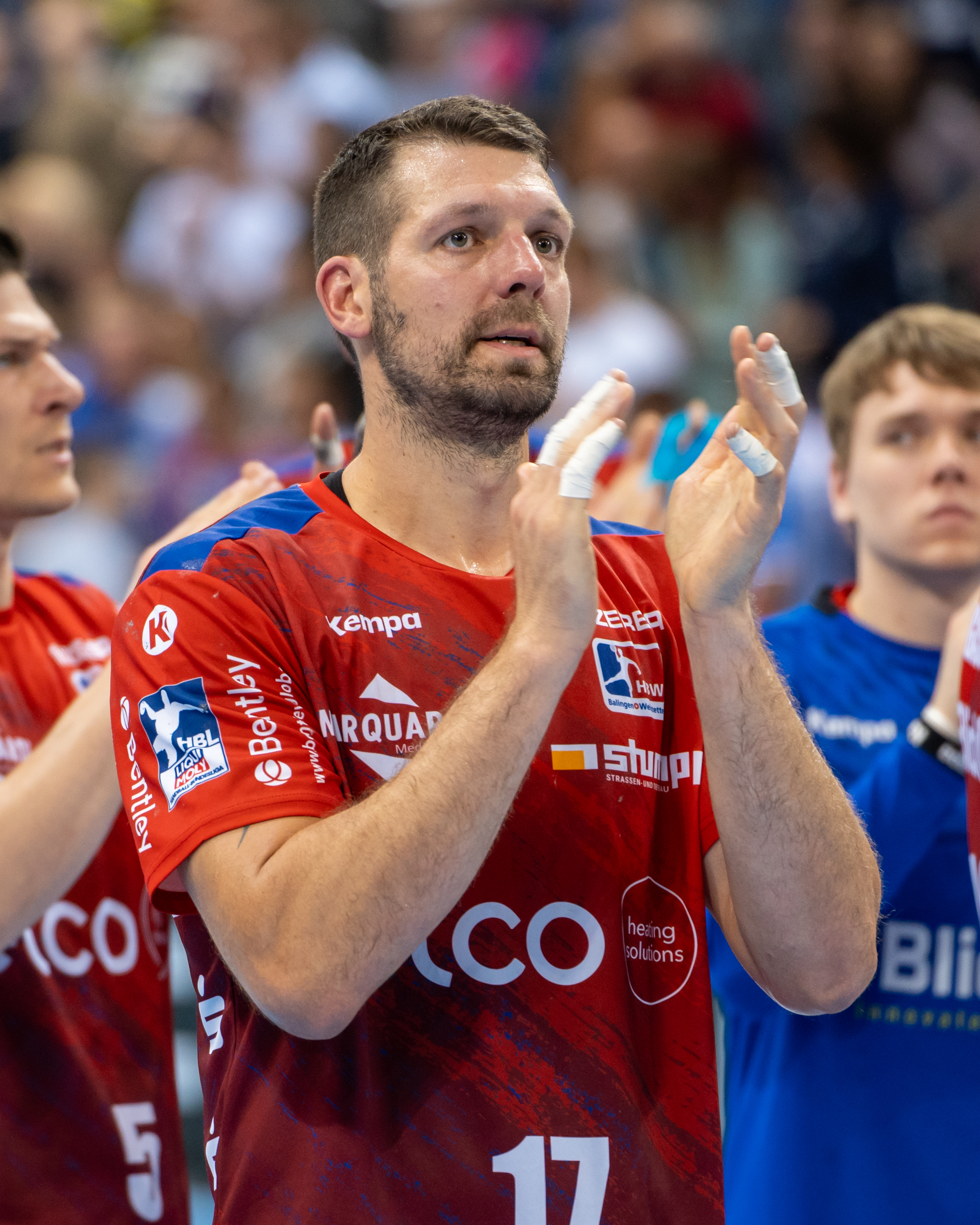

Personal information
- Nationality: German
- Born: 24 July 1985 (age 41) Freiburg im Breisgau, Germany
- Height: 1.98 m (6 ft 6 in)

Sport
- Sport: Handball
- Position: Pivot
- Current club: HBW Balingen-Weilstetten

Senior clubs
- Years: Team
- 1999–2007: SG Köndringen/Teningen
- 2007–2009: TV Willstätt/HR Ortenau
- 2009–2021: MT Melsungen
- 2021–2022: HSG Wetzlar
- 2022–2024: HBW Balingen-Weilstetten
- 3/2025–04/2025: MT Melsungen
National team
Years	Team	Apps	(Gls)
2012–2014	Germany	18	(16)

Felix Danner (born 24 July 1985) is a German handball player for MT Melsungen.
