= Michael Müller (handballer) =

German handball player (born 1984)

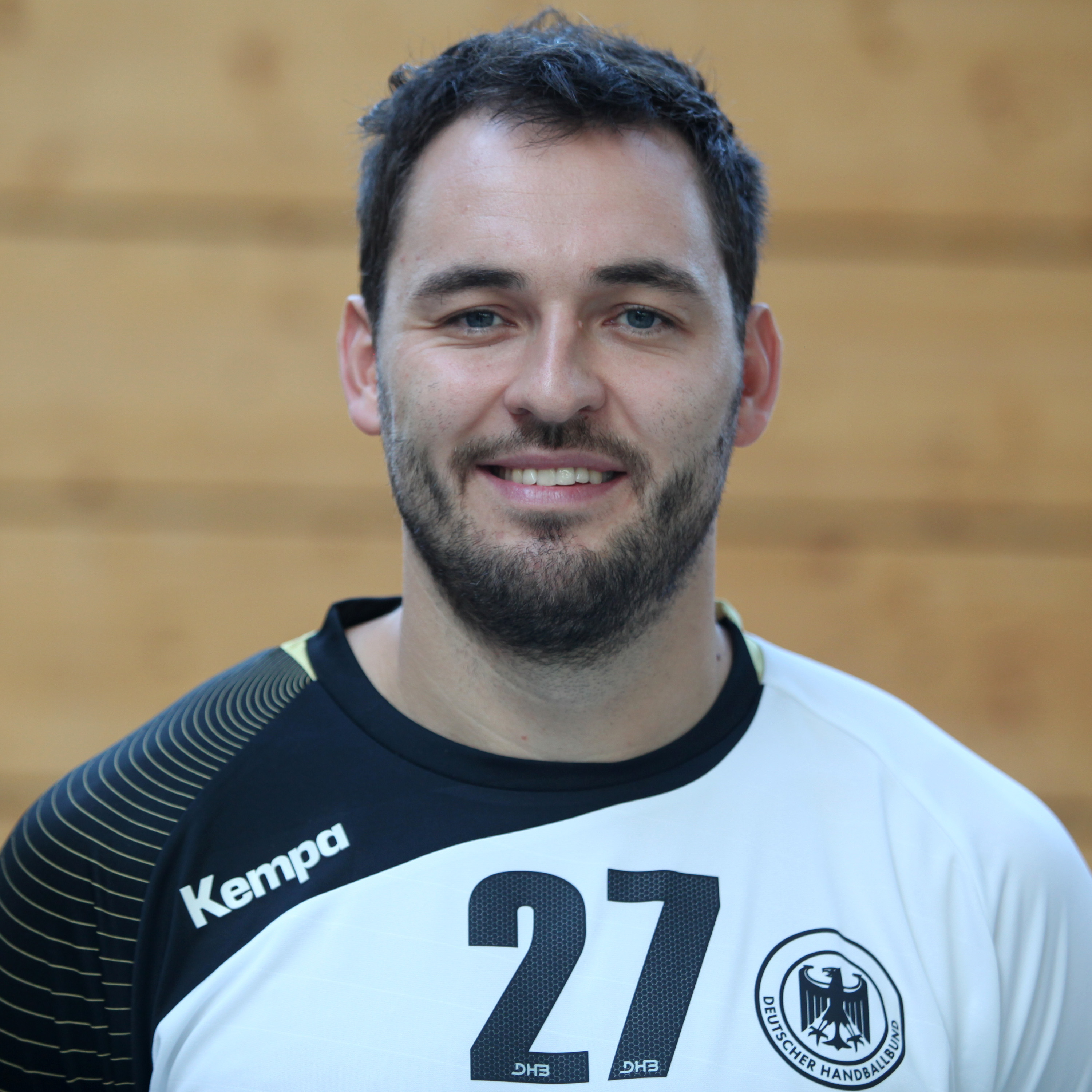
- Müller in 2014

Personal information
- Born: 19 September 1984 (age 42) Würzburg, Germany
- Height: 1.97 m (6 ft 6 in)

Sport
- Sport: Handball
- Position: Right back
- Current club: SG Flensburg-Handewitt
- Number: 25

Senior clubs
- Years: Team
- 2001–2006: HaSpo Bayreuth
- 2006–2009: TV Großwallstadt
- 2009–2012: Rhein-Neckar Löwen
- 2012–2013: HSG Wetzlar
- 2013–2019: MT Melsungen
- 2019-2020: Füchse Berlin
- 2021: SG Flensburg-Handewitt
National team
Years	Team	Apps	(Gls)
2008–	Germany	72	(132)

Michael Müller (born 19 September 1984) is a German handballer who plays for Bundesliga club SG Flensburg-Handewitt and the German national team.
