= Supporter liaison officer =

A supporter liaison officer (SLO, sometimes also supporters liaison officer or supporters' liaison officer) is a person within an association football club (or another sports club) functioning as a bridge between the club itself and supporters of the club. The SLO builds relations with the club management and the fans through two-way communication, informing supporters about decisions made by the club and informing the club about the fan's point of view. The SLO also works with security and police as well as the SLOs of other clubs to ensure that relevant knowledge is spread to all organisations participating in matches and other events of the club.

== History ==
The role has its roots in Germany, where the first SLO appeared at Borussia Mönchengladbach in 1989 in a part-time and volunteer capacity. In 1992, the German "National Concept Sport and Security" (Nationales Konzept Sport und Sicherheit, NKSS) introduced the SLO as part of its concept on how to tackle the hooliganism and violence that surrounded German football in the 1970s and 1980s. The first full-time SLO was employed in 1996, and from the 2018–19 season all Bundesliga clubs are required to have three full-time SLOs.

In a survey initiated by UEFA in 2007, a majority of the consulted national associations wanted to improve relations between clubs and fans, to enable fans to become "more serious and responsible partners". To achieve this, UEFA started backing several European supporter organisations, such as Supporters Direct Europe (SD Europe) and Football Supporters Europe (FSE). UEFA also acknowledged that football supporters had been largely ignored in the dialogue surrounding football, but should be considered valued members of the football family. One outcome of this commitment was the creation of the UEFA Supporter Liaison Officer Handbook published in 2011.

Article 35 of the UEFA Club Licensing and Financial Fair Play Regulations also requires clubs participating in UEFA club competitions (UEFA Champions League and UEFA Europa League) to have an appointed SLO since the start of the 2012–13 season. This was a result of several years of talks between UEFA and Supporters Direct which resulted in a UEFA approval of the SLO concept in 2009–10.

A majority of the national member associations of UEFA have also adopted Article 35 as part of the requirements for national club licenses in the top tier or top tiers of their respective league systems. For example, all clubs in the Premier League are required to, and all clubs in the English Football League have agreed to, have an SLO. As a result, more than a thousand clubs across European football are required to have an appointed SLO.

The SLO Coordinator at UEFA and SD Europe, Stuart Dykes, highlights Germany—the birthplace of the SLO role—as the leading country in terms of SLO work, with Poland and Sweden as two other good examples. UEFA has called the Swedish SLO organisation and work "best practice", and among the countries that initiated SLO projects in 2012 when UEFA introduced the SLO requirement, Sweden has come the furthest.

== Responsibilities ==
The type of employment for SLOs across Europe vary from volunteering to full-time or part-time employment, as a role in its own or as an additional function of someone already employed by a club in another role. UEFA prefers that the SLO is a full-time employment role, but also acknowledges both the possibility of having multiple SLOs at larger clubs, or SLOs working part-time or volunteering at smaller clubs.

The SLO standard definition in the UEFA Supporter Liaison Officer Handbook consists of five areas of responsibility:

- To be a bridge and improve communication between the fans and the club.
- To rely on information and credibility from both sides.
- To inform supporters of club decisions and communicate the fan point of view to the club.
- To build relations with fan groups and initiatives as well as with police and security.
- To stay in touch with SLOs of club opponents.

SD Europe summarises the main areas of work as dialogue, service and prevention. The role is proactive, rather than reactive, and that while preventing violence is one of the goals of an SLO, as soon as violence occurs, the SLO should not intervene but leave matters to police and stewards. The appearance of SLOs in Swedish football has been cited by the Swedish Football League and Swedish police as a major contributor to a 20 percent reduction of crowd disorder.

== Outside association football ==
In 2015, Doncaster R.L.F.C. was the first Rugby Football League club to appoint an SLO.

Luleå HF became the first Swedish ice hockey club to employ an SLO in June 2017.
