= Petr Házl =

Czech handball player

Petr Házl (born 29 August 1971 in Litoměřice) is a Czech former handball player who competed in the 1992 Summer Olympics.
