= List of Serbian football transfers summer 2018 =

- This is a list of transfers in Serbian football for the 2018–19 summer transfer window.
- Moves featuring Serbian SuperLiga and Serbian First League sides are listed.
- The order by which the clubs are listed is equal to the classifications at the end of the 2017–18 season.

== Serbian SuperLiga ==
=== Red Star Belgrade ===
In: Note: Flags indicate national team as defined under FIFA eligibility rules; some limited exceptions apply. Players may hold more than one non-FIFA nationality.

No.	Pos.	Nation	Player
9	FW	Serbia	Milan Pavkov (loan return from Radnički Niš)
—	DF	Serbia	Bogdan Račić (loan return from Sremac Vojka)
93	DF	Serbia	Aleksa Terzić (loan return from Grafičar Beograd)
—	FW	Serbia	Stefan Vudragović (loan return from Grafičar Beograd)
29	MF	Serbia	Dušan Jovančić (from Vojvodina)
8	MF	Serbia	Dejan Meleg (from (Turkey) Kayserispor)
19	FW	Serbia	Nikola Stojiljković (on loan from (Portugal) Braga)
33	FW	Serbia	Milan Jevtović (from (Turkey) Antalyaspor)
1	GK	Serbia	Zoran Popović (from (Norway) Bodø/Glimt)
37	DF	Ghana	Rashid Sumaila (on loan from (Kuwait) Qadsia)
11	MF	Netherlands	Lorenzo Ebecilio (from (Cyprus) APOEL)
5	DF	Australia	Milos Degenek (from (Japan) Yokohama Marinos)
21	MF	Serbia	Veljko Simić (from Zemun)
22	FW	Brazil	Jonathan Cafu (on loan from (France) Bordeaux)
—	MF	Serbia	Ilija Stojančić (from Grafičar Beograd, to youth team)
—	FW	Serbia	Mihajlo Đorđević (from Partizan, to youth team)
—	GK	Serbia	Luka Savić (from Sloboda Užice, to youth team)
—	MF	Serbia	Andrej Ivanović (from Jagodina, to youth team)
20	MF	Serbia	Goran Čaušić (from (Russia) Arsenal Tula)
17	MF	Germany	Marko Marin (from (Greece) Olympiacos)
99	FW	Ghana	Richmond Boakye (from (China) Jiangsu Suning)

Out: Note: Flags indicate national team as defined under FIFA eligibility rules; some limited exceptions apply. Players may hold more than one non-FIFA nationality.

No.	Pos.	Nation	Player
33	DF	Serbia	Dušan Anđelković (retired)
11	MF	Serbia	Luka Adžić (to (Belgium) Anderlecht)
40	MF	Serbia	Luka Ilić (loan return to (England) Manchester City)
4	MF	France	Damien Le Tallec (to (France) Montpellier)
20	MF	Netherlands	Mitchell Donald (to (Turkey) Yeni Malatyaspor)
1	GK	Serbia	Damir Kahriman (released)
6	MF	Serbia	Uroš Račić (to (Spain) Valencia)
5	DF	Ghana	Abraham Frimpong (to (Hungary) Ferencváros)
98	FW	Serbia	Vanja Vučićević (to (Russia) Krylia Sovetov, was on loan at Spartak Subotica)
41	GK	Serbia	Jovan Vićić (to Mačva Šabac, was on loan at (Bosnia and Herzegovina) Drina Zvornik)
24	DF	Serbia	Slađan Rakić (to Spartak Subotica, was on loan at Grafičar Beograd)
45	FW	Serbia	Aleksandar Pešić (to (Saudi Arabia) Al-Ittihad)
—	GK	Serbia	Vojkan Damnjanović (to Partizan)
—	MF	Serbia	Damjan Gojkov (to Vojvodina, was on loan at Bežanija)
—	MF	Serbia	Andrija Luković (was on loan, now signed with Voždovac)
—	DF	Serbia	Aleksandar Kostić (to Bačka BP)
—	FW	Serbia	Milan Senić (to (Germany) SC Düsseldorf-West, was on loan at Grafičar Beograd)
21	MF	Serbia	Filip Bainović (was on loan, now signed with Rad)
—	FW	Bosnia and Herzegovina	Milan Savić (to (Belgium) Mechelen)
—	DF	Serbia	Nemanja Stojić (loan extension to Grafičar Beograd)
32	GK	Serbia	Aleksandar Stanković (loan extension to Grafičar Beograd)
17	MF	Serbia	Veljko Nikolić (loan extension to Grafičar Beograd)
73	FW	Serbia	Jug Stanojev (loan extension to Grafičar Beograd)
—	MF	Serbia	Viktor Živojinović (to Jedinstvo Ub, was on loan at Grafičar Beograd)
—	MF	Bosnia and Herzegovina	Jovan Ilić (to Brodarac, was on loan at Grafičar Beograd)
—		Serbia	Mihailo Aćimović (to Brodarac)
—		Serbia	Vukan Đorđević (on loan to Grafičar Beograd)
—	DF	Serbia	Marko Janković (on loan to Grafičar Beograd)
—	MF	Bosnia and Herzegovina	Stefan Santrač (on loan to Grafičar Beograd)
—		Serbia	Damjan Drinčić (on loan to Grafičar Beograd)
—	GK	Serbia	Strahinja Savić (on loan to Grafičar Beograd, was on loan at Sopot)
—	MF	Serbia	Željko Gavrić (on loan to Grafičar Beograd)
—	DF	Serbia	Marko Kojić (on loan to Grafičar Beograd)
—	DF	Serbia	Marko Konatar (loan extension to Grafičar Beograd)
—	DF	Serbia	Ranko Jokić (on loan to Grafičar Beograd)
—	MF	Serbia	Miloš Z. Nikolić (loan extension to Grafičar Beograd)
—	MF	Bosnia and Herzegovina	Stefan Kovač (loan extension to IMT)
—	MF	Serbia	Blagota Marković (to Zemun, was on loan at Grafičar Beograd)
—	MF	Serbia	Andrija Crnadak (to Zvezdara, was on loan at Grafičar Beograd)
—	DF	Serbia	Draško Đorđević (to (Saudi Arabia) Al-Mujazzal, was on loan at Bežanija)
—	MF	Serbia	Miodrag Maljković (to Trayal)
—		Serbia	Stefan Trimanović (to Mačva Šabac)
—	MF	Serbia	Nikola Puzić (to Mačva Bogatić, was on loan at Grafičar Beograd)
—	GK	Serbia	Miloš Čupić (on loan to Zlatibor Čajetina, previously brought from OFK Beograd)
40	MF	Serbia	Stefan Cvetković (on loan to Bačka BP, was on loan at Grafičar Beograd)
—	FW	Serbia	Radivoj Bosić (on loan to Grafičar Beograd)
—	MF	Russia	Maksim Lada (on loan to Grafičar Beograd)
—	FW	Serbia	Aleksandar Bogdanović (released)
—	FW	Serbia	Lazar Romanić (to (Greece) Lamia, was on loan at Borac Čačak)
49	FW	Serbia	Nemanja Radonjić (to (France) Marseille, previously brought from (Italy) Roma)
—	FW	Serbia	Nikola Veselinović (on loan to Jedinstvo Putevi)
—	MF	Slovakia	Erik Jirka (on loan to (Slovakia) Spartak Trnava, previously brought from the same club)
44	DF	Brazil	Zé Marcos (loan extension to Rad)
—	FW	Ghana	Ibrahim Tanko (on loan to Bežanija)
—		Serbia	Marko Đurić (to Žarkovo)
—		Serbia	Nikola Simonović (to OFK Beograd)
—	MF	Serbia	Milan Tomić (on loan to Grafičar Beograd)
—	GK	Serbia	Ilija Ćatić (on loan to IMT, was on loan at Grafičar Beograd)
—	GK	Serbia	Mateja Radosavljević (on loan to IMT)

=== Partizan ===
In: Note: Flags indicate national team as defined under FIFA eligibility rules; some limited exceptions apply. Players may hold more than one non-FIFA nationality.

No.	Pos.	Nation	Player
—	DF	Bosnia and Herzegovina	Aleksandar Subić (loan return from Radnički Niš)
—	DF	Montenegro	Peđa Savić (loan return from Teleoptik)
12	GK	Serbia	Filip Kljajić (loan return from (Greece) Platanias)
—	MF	Serbia	Ljubodrag Tomović (loan return from Spartak Subotica)
—	MF	Serbia	Dragan Čubra (loan return from Teleoptik)
17	DF	Serbia	Zlatan Šehović (loan return from Teleoptik)
—	DF	Serbia	Nikola Mirić (loan return from Teleoptik)
9	FW	Serbia	Nemanja Nikolić (from Spartak Subotica)
11	FW	Cape Verde	Ricardo Gomes (from (Portugal) Nacional)
44	DF	Romania	Gabriel Enache (from (Russia) Rubin Kazan)
6	DF	Spain	Marc Valiente (from (Belgium) Eupen)
—	GK	Serbia	Vojkan Damnjanović (from Red Star Belgrade, to youth team)
99	MF	Serbia	Milan Smiljanić (from (Israel) Hapoel Ashkelon)
77	MF	Bosnia and Herzegovina	Goran Zakarić (from (Bosnia and Herzegovina) Željezničar Sarajevo)
19	MF	Montenegro	Aleksandar Šćekić (from (Turkey) Gençlerbirliği)
—	DF	Serbia	Mihailo Ilić (from Polet Ljubić)

Out: Note: Flags indicate national team as defined under FIFA eligibility rules; some limited exceptions apply. Players may hold more than one non-FIFA nationality.

No.	Pos.	Nation	Player
45	MF	Serbia	Jovan Nišić (to Voždovac, was on loan at Teleoptik)
—	MF	Serbia	Veljko Birmančević (on loan to Čukarički, was on loan at Rad)
—	MF	Serbia	Filip Jović (to Napredak Kruševac, was on loan at Teleoptik)
33	DF	Serbia	Nemanja Antonov (loan return to (Switzerland) Grasshopper)
3	FW	Cameroon	Léandre Tawamba (to (Saudi Arabia) Al-Taawoun)
—	FW	Serbia	Stefan Đurić (was on loan, now signed with Teleoptik)
—	DF	Serbia	Marko Simunović (to Teleoptik)
30	DF	Serbia	Milan Mitrović (to (Turkey) Adana Demirspor)
21	MF	Serbia	Marko Jevtović (to (Turkey) Konyaspor)
85	GK	Serbia	Nemanja Stevanović (on loan to Čukarički, was on loan at Rad)
—	FW	Serbia	Nikola Lakčević (loan extension to Teleoptik)
—	MF	Serbia	Bojan Bojić (to Radnik Surdulica)
90	FW	Serbia	Strahinja Jovanović (on loan to Proleter Novi Sad)
5	DF	Serbia	Strahinja Bošnjak (on loan to Zemun)
99	FW	Serbia	Đorđe Jovanović (to (Belgium) Lokeren)
—	MF	Serbia	Lazar Nikolić (to (Italy) S.P.A.L)
—		Serbia	Uroš Arsović (on loan to Jedinstvo Ub, was on loan at Radnički Obrenovac)
—	DF	Serbia	Jovan Vlalukin (loan extension to Teleoptik)
34	MF	Burkina Faso	Dramane Salou (on loan to Teleoptik)
37	FW	Serbia	Miloš Kukolj (loan extension to Budućnost Dobanovci)
—	DF	Serbia	Filip Antonijević (to Teleoptik)
—	GK	Serbia	Marko Lazarević (on loan to Radnički Beograd, previously brought from the same club)
—	FW	Serbia	Vukašin Jovković (to Grafičar Beograd)
—	GK	Serbia	Stevan Jovanović (was on loan, now signed with Jedinstvo Surčin)
—	MF	Serbia	Strahinja Karišić (on loan to Teleoptik, previously brought from Rad)
—		Serbia	Mihajlo Đorđević (to Red Star Belgrade)
—	DF	Serbia	Andrej Đorđev (to Zemun)
—	GK	Serbia	Branislav Đokić (to Provo)
41	GK	Serbia	Aleksandar Popović (on loan to Teleoptik)
—	FW	Serbia	Andrej Ilić (to Napredak Kruševac)
14	MF	Ukraine	Yuri Vakulko (on loan to (Ukraine) Arsenal Kyiv)
51	FW	Serbia	Ognjen Ožegović (on loan to (Russia) Arsenal Tula)
—	DF	Montenegro	Ognjen Peličić (on loan to Teleoptik, previously brought from (Montenegro) Mornar Bar)
—	DF	Bosnia and Herzegovina	Nemanja Vještica (on loan to Teleoptik)
—	DF	Serbia	Adnan Islamović (on loan to Žarkovo, was on loan at Teleoptik)
20	MF	Guinea	Seydouba Soumah (on loan to (Israel) Maccabi Haifa)
8	FW	Serbia	Vladimir Đilas (to Jedinstvo Surčin)

=== Radnički Niš ===
In: Note: Flags indicate national team as defined under FIFA eligibility rules; some limited exceptions apply. Players may hold more than one non-FIFA nationality.

No.	Pos.	Nation	Player
15	DF	Serbia	Đorđe Crnomarković (from Javor Ivanjica)
17	FW	Bosnia and Herzegovina	Nermin Haskić (from (Slovakia) Ružomberok)
8	DF	North Macedonia	Aleksandar Todorovski (from (Poland) Zagłębie Lubin)
12	GK	Serbia	Ivan Bulajić (from Radnički Pirot)
90	FW	Serbia	Slađan Nikodijević (from Inđija)
14	DF	Ukraine	Taras Bondarenko (from Metalac G. M.)
6	DF	Serbia	Radovan Pankov (from (Russia) Ural)
18	FW	Montenegro	Petar Grbić (from (Montenegro) Budućnost Podgorica)
20	MF	Montenegro	Nikola Drinčić (from Čukarički)
19	GK	Serbia	Borivoje Ristić (from (Greece) Panserraikos)
98	MF	Serbia	Uroš Damnjanović (from (Slovakia) Slovan Bratislava)
99	FW	Sweden	Marko Mitrović (from (Denmark) SønderjyskE)
—	MF	Serbia	Veljko Badicović (from Timok, to youth team)
77	MF	Serbia	Lazar Ranđelović (on loan from, previously sold to (Greece) Olympiacos)
3	DF	Serbia	Stefan Đorđević (from (Italy) Catania)

Out: Note: Flags indicate national team as defined under FIFA eligibility rules; some limited exceptions apply. Players may hold more than one non-FIFA nationality.

No.	Pos.	Nation	Player
19	DF	Bosnia and Herzegovina	Aleksandar Subić (loan return to Partizan)
25	FW	Serbia	Milan Pavkov (loan return to Red Star Belgrade)
8	FW	Serbia	Slaviša Stojanović (to (India) Kerala Blasters)
41	GK	Serbia	Đorđe Lazović (to Kolubara)
45	DF	Serbia	Ivan Miladinović (to (Russia) Sochi)
22	GK	Serbia	Mladen Stojiljković (to Brodarac)
77	MF	Bosnia and Herzegovina	Anid Travančić (released)
—	DF	Serbia	Lazar Anđelković (to Moravac Mrštane, was on loan at Radnički Pirot)
14	DF	Serbia	Miloš Petrović (to (Bulgaria) Lokomotiv Plovdiv)
50	GK	Serbia	Bojan Šaranov (to (Greece) Lamia)
31	MF	Serbia	Dušan Lalatović (on loan to Dinamo Vranje)
2	DF	Serbia	Filip Stanković (on loan to Car Konstantin, was on loan at Dinamo Vranje)
—	FW	Serbia	Amir Zeka (to Moravica Subotinac, was on loan at Rudar Alpos)
—	FW	Serbia	Lazar Nikolić (to Zaplanjac, was on loan at Jedinstvo Bošnjace)
—	DF	Serbia	Dragomir Nikolić (to Zaplanjac)
—		Serbia	Vuk Bulatović (to Zaplanjac)
5	DF	Serbia	Nikola Stevanović (on loan to Dinamo Vranje)
44	DF	Serbia	Radoš Bulatović (released)
—	DF	Serbia	Mihajlo Topalović (to Budućnost Popovac)
—	MF	Serbia	Mario Stojanović (to Sopot, was on loan at Car Konstantin)
—	DF	Serbia	Srđan Marinković (to Sinđelić Niš)
—	FW	Serbia	Mladen Radenković (to Sinđelić Niš)
—	DF	Serbia	Petar Bogdanović (on loan to Dunav Prahovo, was on loan at Timok)
69	MF	Serbia	Marko Listeš (was on loan, now signed with Car Konstantin)
27	DF	Serbia	Petar Ćirković (on loan to Radnički Pirot)
26	DF	Serbia	Vladimir Simunović (to Spartak Subotica)
32	GK	Serbia	Milorad Kojić (on loan to Jedinstvo Bošnjace)
23	MF	Serbia	Dušan Mićić (to Proleter Novi Sad)
—	DF	Serbia	Mladen Mitrović (released)
—		Serbia	Branislav Mladenović (to Pukovac)

=== Spartak Subotica ===
In: Note: Flags indicate national team as defined under FIFA eligibility rules; some limited exceptions apply. Players may hold more than one non-FIFA nationality.

No.	Pos.	Nation	Player
—	FW	Serbia	Marko Varga (loan return from Indeks Novi Sad, to youth team)
—	FW	Serbia	Aleksa Stjepanović (loan return from SFS Borac Paraćin)
—	MF	Serbia	Strahinja Lukić (loan return from Bačka 1901)
—	FW	Serbia	Mihailo Mihailović (loan return from Bačka 1901)
24	MF	North Macedonia	Benjamin Demir (from (North Macedonia) Skopje)
1	GK	Serbia	Nikola Perić (from Vojvodina)
27	DF	Serbia	Slađan Rakić (from Red Star Belgrade)
9	FW	Serbia	Dejan Đenić (from Zemun)
31	MF	Serbia	Milan Marčić (from Javor Ivanjica)
26	MF	Serbia	Andrija Milić (from Jagodina)
77	FW	Ghana	Samuel Afum (free, last with (Egypt) Wadi Degla)
39	MF	Chinese Taipei	Tim Chow (from (Scotland) Ross County)
55	DF	Ukraine	Serhiy Kulynych (from (Ukraine) Olimpik Donetsk)
23	FW	Serbia	Nemanja Obradović (from (Finland) Honka)
30	DF	Serbia	Vladimir Simunović (from Radnički Niš)
17	FW	Montenegro	Stefan Denković (from (Montenegro) Sutjeska Nikšić)
28	MF	Nigeria	Bassey Inyang Howells (from (Oman) Al-Suwaiq)

Out: Note: Flags indicate national team as defined under FIFA eligibility rules; some limited exceptions apply. Players may hold more than one non-FIFA nationality.

No.	Pos.	Nation	Player
—		Serbia	Marko Stojak (loan return to Vojvodina)
24	FW	Serbia	Vanja Vučićević (loan return to Red Star Belgrade)
35	MF	Senegal	Cheikhou Dieng (loan return to (Turkey) İstanbul Başakşehir)
—	MF	Serbia	Ljubodrag Tomović (loan return to Partizan)
9	FW	Serbia	Nemanja Nikolić (to Partizan)
33	MF	Ecuador	Jainer Medina (released)
30	DF	Serbia	Aranđel Stojković (to Vojvodina)
70	FW	Serbia	Sava Petrov (to (Belgium) Westerlo)
16	MF	Serbia	Marko Pantić (to Bačka BP, was on loan at ČSK Čelarevo)
—	DF	Serbia	Boško Gajić (to Omladinac Novi Banovci, was on loan at Inđija)
—	DF	Serbia	Ivan Tomac (to Radnički Sremska Mitrovica)
23	MF	Serbia	Mile Savković (to (Poland) Jagiellonia Białystok)
—	MF	Serbia	Aleksa Matić (to Smederevo, previously brought from Budućnost Dobanovci)
—	DF	Serbia	Nemanja Lazić (on loan to Tisa Adorjan)
20	FW	Serbia	Bogdan Stamenković (was on loan, now signed with Bratstvo Prigrevica)
13	FW	Serbia	Igor Antunić (to Radnički 1912, was on loan at Bačka 1901)
26	FW	Montenegro	Filip Vorotović (to (Montenegro) Iskra Danilovgrad)
66	DF	Montenegro	Nikola Popović (on loan to (Montenegro) Mornar Bar)
27	DF	Serbia	Dimitrije Tomović (to Hajduk Kula, was on loan at Proleter Novi Sad)
—	DF	Serbia	Vojislav Stanaćev (to Bačka Pačir)
17	MF	Serbia	Milivoj Krmar (loan return from Bačka 1901)
22	MF	Serbia	Predrag Medić (loan extension to Bačka 1901)
14	MF	Serbia	Nemanja Matijević (on loan to Bačka 1901)
—	GK	Serbia	Dino Žužo (on loan to Vinogradar, was on loan at Bačka 1901)
—	DF	Serbia	Sergej Budimir (on loan to Vinogradar)
—	DF	Serbia	Lazar Kaurin (on loan to Vinogradar)
—	MF	Serbia	Aleksandar Mirkonj (on loan to Vinogradar)
—	MF	Serbia	Pavle Stojanović (on loan to Vinogradar)
—		Serbia	Slaviša Todorović (to Preporod)
—		Serbia	Nenad Sredojević (to Cement)
—	DF	Serbia	Ensar Brunčević (on loan to Jošanica)
—		Serbia	Uroš Dakić (on loan to Tekstilac Odžaci)
—	FW	Serbia	Davor Vuković (to Bačka 1901)
—	MF	Serbia	Kristijan Poturica (to Bačka 1901, was on loan at Bačka Pačir)
16	MF	Serbia	Jovan Lazić (on loan to Bačka 1901)
—	DF	Serbia	Luka Đurović (to Bačka Pačir, was on loan at OFK Odžaci)
—		Serbia	Risto Ristić (to Bačka 1901)
1	GK	Serbia	Bojan Jović (to Bačka 1901)
28	FW	Serbia	Ognjen Đuričin (to Vojvodina)
—	GK	Serbia	Vojin Stajković (on loan to Hajduk Kula)
—		Serbia	Nemanja Tomić (was on loan, now signed with Sloga Temerin)
—	MF	Serbia	Slavko Milutinov (to Tekstilac Odžaci)
19	FW	Serbia	Stefan Šormaz (on loan to Bačka 1901)
—	GK	Serbia	Mario Janković (on loan to Vinogradar)
—	FW	Serbia	Luka Belić (to (Greece) Nestos Chrysoupoli)

=== Voždovac ===
In: Note: Flags indicate national team as defined under FIFA eligibility rules; some limited exceptions apply. Players may hold more than one non-FIFA nationality.

No.	Pos.	Nation	Player
—	DF	Serbia	Filip Damjanović (loan return from IMT)
24	MF	Serbia	Stefan Purtić (loan return from Radnički Obrenovac)
28	MF	Serbia	Jovica Blagojević (loan return from Radnički Obrenovac)
5	DF	Serbia	Božidar Veličković (from Dinamo Pančevo)
10	MF	Serbia	Jovan Nišić (from Partizan)
17	DF	Serbia	Bojan Kovačević (from Inđija)
19	DF	Serbia	Nikola Mikić (from (Turkey) Manisaspor)
11	MF	Serbia	Marko Zoćević (from Borac Čačak)
55	DF	Bosnia and Herzegovina	Branko Ostojić (from (Greece) Doxa Drama)
32	FW	Serbia	Aleksandar Jevtić (free, last with (Thailand) Pattaya United)
20	MF	Serbia	Andrija Luković (was on loan, now signed from Red Star Belgrade)
31	GK	Serbia	Marko Ilić (from Vojvodina)
27	DF	Serbia	Marko Jovanović (from (Greece) AEL)
88	MF	Serbia	Lazar Zličić (from Vojvodina)
16	FW	Serbia	Luka Milunović (from (Greece) Aris)
—	MF	Serbia	Jezdimir Nedeljković (from (North Macedonia) Rabotnički)

Out: Note: Flags indicate national team as defined under FIFA eligibility rules; some limited exceptions apply. Players may hold more than one non-FIFA nationality.

No.	Pos.	Nation	Player
—	MF	Serbia	Luka Gojković (loan return to BSK Borča)
33	FW	Sweden	Andrej Simeunović (to (Sweden) IFK Malmö)
16	MF	Serbia	Marko Pavlovski (to (Portugal) Varzim)
17	DF	Serbia	Miloš Stojanović (to Bežanija)
7	FW	Serbia	Miloš Stanković (to Radnik Surdulica)
—	MF	Serbia	Luka Maksimović (to Metalac G. M.)
41	DF	Serbia	Mihailo Jovanović (to (Belarus) Neman Grodno)
11	FW	Montenegro	Mihailo Perović (to (Montenegro) Budućnost Podgorica)
—	MF	Serbia	Mihailo Oreščanin (to Budućnost Dobanovci, was on loan at Radnički Obrenovac)
5	DF	Serbia	Marko Gajić (to (Slovenia) Olimpija Ljubljana)
19	DF	Montenegro	Darko Bulatović (to (Montenegro) Sutjeska Nikšić)
27	MF	Serbia	Nebojša Gavrić (to Bačka BP)
—		Bosnia and Herzegovina	Aleksa Mrđa (to Lokomotiva Železnik)
9	FW	Serbia	Marko Pavićević (to (Montenegro) OFK Titograd)
—		Serbia	Marko Ćirić (to Sinđelić Beograd)
—		Serbia	Andrija Zakoč (to Zlatibor Čajetina)
16	MF	Serbia	Vasilije Janjić (on loan to Sinđelić Beograd, previously bought from OFK Beograd)
1	GK	Serbia	Stefan Čupić (released)
12	GK	Montenegro	Maksim Milović (to (Spain) San Fernando)
15	MF	Serbia	Vladan Vidaković (on loan to Radnički Obrenovac)
—	MF	Serbia	Radovan Avram (loan extension to GSP Polet Dorćol)
—	MF	Serbia	Predrag Budimir (to Lokomotiva Železnik)
—	DF	Serbia	Vladimir Arsović (to Radnički Beograd)
—	FW	Serbia	Almir Eminović (to Omladinac Novi Banovci)
—	GK	Serbia	Stefan Milinković (to Železničar Lajkovac)
—		Serbia	Uroš Vuković (to (Slovakia) Sereď, was on loan at GSP Polet Dorćol)
4	DF	Serbia	Marko Mirkailo (to Temnić)
26	MF	Serbia	Nikola Srećković (to Vojvodina)
—		Serbia	Jovan Velev (to Zemun)
—		Serbia	Kosta Igić (to Dunav Stari Banovci)
—		Serbia	Aleksa Stegnjaić (to Heroj Polet, was on loan at BSK Borča)
—		Serbia	Mihailo Rafailović (to BASK)

=== Čukarički ===
In: Note: Flags indicate national team as defined under FIFA eligibility rules; some limited exceptions apply. Players may hold more than one non-FIFA nationality.

No.	Pos.	Nation	Player
11	FW	Serbia	Marko Šarić (loan return from IMT)
33	MF	Serbia	Aleksandar Đorđević (loan return from IMT)
32	FW	Serbia	Kosta Aleksić (from Bečej)
14	MF	Serbia	Veljko Birmančević (on loan from Partizan)
28	MF	Bosnia and Herzegovina	Nenad Kiso (from Zemun)
42	GK	Serbia	Nemanja Stevanović (on loan from Partizan)
—	GK	Serbia	Aleksandar Knežević (loan extension from Apolon Kovači)
—	DF	Serbia	Aleksa Denić (on loan from Kiker, to youth team)

Out: Note: Flags indicate national team as defined under FIFA eligibility rules; some limited exceptions apply. Players may hold more than one non-FIFA nationality.

No.	Pos.	Nation	Player
20	MF	Greece	Nemanja Milojević (to Vojvodina)
9	FW	Ivory Coast	Ismaël Béko Fofana (to Vojvodina)
—	FW	Montenegro	Staniša Mandić (was on loan, now signed with (Norway) Sogndal)
12	GK	Serbia	Aleksandar Kirovski (to (North Macedonia) Vardar)
—	MF	Serbia	Luka Zorić (to IMT, was on loan at Grafičar Beograd)
11	MF	Serbia	Petar Milić (to OFK Beograd)
44	MF	Montenegro	Dušan Lagator (to (Russia) Sochi, was on loan at (Russia) Dynamo Saint Petersburg)
2	DF	Serbia	Sava Radić (on loan to Bečej)
42	FW	Serbia	Ivan Jovanović (to Radnički Beograd)
31	DF	Serbia	Đorđe Bašanović (to Zemun)
8	MF	Montenegro	Nikola Drinčić (to Radnički Niš)
—	MF	Serbia	Živorad Arnautović (to Rad, was on loan at Internacional)
—	MF	Serbia	Luka Dimitrijević (to Rad)
—	GK	Serbia	Nikola Sremčević (to Radnički Kragujevac)
—	DF	Serbia	Đorđe Šošević (loan extension to IMT)
—	FW	Serbia	Luka Ristivojević (on loan to IMT, was on loan at Zlatibor Čajetina)
—	DF	Serbia	Marko Ilić (on loan to IMT)
12	GK	Serbia	Đorđe Petrović (on loan to IMT)
—	MF	Ghana	Obeng Regan (to (Croatia) Istra 1961, was on loan at (Croatia) Inter Zaprešić)
—	DF	Serbia	Mihajlo Kovačević (on loan to Internacional)

=== Napredak Kruševac ===
In: Note: Flags indicate national team as defined under FIFA eligibility rules; some limited exceptions apply. Players may hold more than one non-FIFA nationality.

No.	Pos.	Nation	Player
8	MF	Serbia	Enver Alivodić (from (Greece) Apollon Smyrnis)
5	DF	Serbia	Marko Marinković (from Borac Čačak)
21	MF	Serbia	Filip Jović (from Partizan)
67	FW	Cameroon	Regis Samuel Baha (free, last with (Tunisia) Marsa)
—	GK	Serbia	Denis Krasić (from Tutin)
19	FW	Serbia	Andrej Ilić (from Partizan)
3	DF	Serbia	Josip Projić (from (Bosnia and Herzegovina) Željezničar Sarajevo)

Out: Note: Flags indicate national team as defined under FIFA eligibility rules; some limited exceptions apply. Players may hold more than one non-FIFA nationality.

No.	Pos.	Nation	Player
8	MF	Serbia	Nenad Šljivić (to (Malta) Balzan)
9	MF	Serbia	Nemanja Milisavljević (to Trayal)
5	DF	Serbia	Miloš Simonović (to (Uzbekistan) Sogdiana)
90	FW	Montenegro	Stefan Nikolić (to (Albania) Partizani)
—	DF	Serbia	Nikola Radmanovac (was on loan, now signed with Trayal)
66	MF	Serbia	Marko Stanojević (to Dinamo Vranje, was on loan at Temnić)
—		Serbia	Đorđe Bojanić (to Sloga Kraljevo)
—		Serbia	Zoran Zrnzević (to Real Podunavci)
19	FW	Serbia	Mitar Radivojević (to Moravac Mrštane)
45	FW	Serbia	Veljko Jovković (to Smederevo)
—		Serbia	Gradimir Trnavac (on loan to Trayal)
—		Serbia	Jovan Kršanin (on loan to Trayal)
—	DF	Serbia	Marko Anđelković (on loan to Trayal)
—	GK	Serbia	Veljko Obradović (on loan to Trayal)
—		Serbia	Aleksa Petrović (on loan to Trayal)
—		Serbia	Stefan Tomić (on loan to Trayal)
—		Serbia	David Ivković (on loan to Trayal)
—		Serbia	Petar Grmuša (on loan to Trayal)
—		Serbia	Andrija Jevtić (on loan to Trayal)
—	FW	Serbia	Matija Nikolić (on loan to Trayal)
—		Serbia	Vojislav Marić (on loan to Trayal)
—		Serbia	Strahinja Živić (on loan to Trayal)
—	MF	Ghana	Musah Alhassan Baba (on loan to Trayal)
7	MF	Serbia	Jovan Markoski (to Mladost Lučani)
57	DF	Serbia	Milan Obradović (on loan to GSP Polet Dorćol)
—		Serbia	Dušan Marković (to Temnić)
99	FW	Switzerland	Milan Basrak (to (Malta) Birkirkara)
31	MF	Serbia	Luka Marković (to Trstenik PPT, was on loan at Jedinstvo Paraćin)

=== Vojvodina ===
In: Note: Flags indicate national team as defined under FIFA eligibility rules; some limited exceptions apply. Players may hold more than one non-FIFA nationality.

No.	Pos.	Nation	Player
—	MF	Serbia	Luka Sinđić (loan return from ČSK Čelarevo)
—	FW	Serbia	Marko Stojak (loan return from Spartak Subotica, to youth team)
30	DF	Serbia	Aranđel Stojković (from Spartak Subotica)
7	MF	Serbia	Milan Đurić (from (Azerbaijan) Zira)
28	MF	Serbia	Aleksandar Mirkov (from Bečej)
22	MF	Greece	Nemanja Milojević (from Čukarički)
11	FW	Ivory Coast	Ismaël Béko Fofana (from Čukarički)
14	DF	Serbia	Lazar Đorđević (from (Slovakia) Podbrezová)
21	MF	Bosnia and Herzegovina	Damir Zlomislić (from (Bosnia and Herzegovina) Široki Brijeg)
19	DF	Greece	Diamantis Chouchoumis (from (Slovakia) Slovan Bratislava)
15	DF	Bosnia and Herzegovina	Daniel Graovac (from (Belgium) Mechelen)
12	GK	Slovenia	Filip Starič (from (Croatia) Cibalia)
13	MF	Serbia	Damjan Gojkov (from Red Star Belgrade)
25	GK	Serbia	Nikola Simić (from Sinđelić Beograd)
23	FW	Serbia	Ognjen Đuričin (from Spartak Subotica)
31	FW	Serbia	Darko Bjedov (from (Belgium) Gent)
6	MF	Serbia	Nemanja Ahčin (from (Slovenia) Krško)
26	MF	Serbia	Nikola Srećković (from Voždovac)
—	MF	Brazil	Patrick (free, last with (Brazil) Fluminense, to youth team)

Out: Note: Flags indicate national team as defined under FIFA eligibility rules; some limited exceptions apply. Players may hold more than one non-FIFA nationality.

No.	Pos.	Nation	Player
29	MF	Serbia	Dušan Jovančić (to Red Star Belgrade)
—	DF	Serbia	Jevrem Kosnić (to (Romania) Universitatea Cluj)
80	MF	North Macedonia	Daniel Avramovski (loan return to (Slovenia) Olimpija Ljubljana)
12	GK	Serbia	Nikola Perić (to Spartak Subotica)
14	DF	Serbia	Ivan Lakićević (to (Italy) Genoa)
28	MF	Montenegro	Luka Vujanović (released)
70	MF	Montenegro	Vasko Kalezić (to (Montenegro) OFK Titograd)
66	DF	Serbia	Aleksandar Radovanović (to (France) Lens)
77	DF	Serbia	Marko Putinčanin (to (Slovenia) Olimpija Ljubljana)
23	MF	Montenegro	Marko Vukasović (to (Hungary) Győr)
40	GK	Serbia	Vukašin Pilipović (on loan to Kabel, was on loan at ČSK Čelarevo)
16	MF	Bosnia and Herzegovina	Predrag Vladić (on loan to Kabel)
18	FW	Bosnia and Herzegovina	Đorđe Pantelić (on loan to Kabel)
—	MF	Bosnia and Herzegovina	Darko Jović (was on loan, now signed for ČSK Čelarevo)
4	DF	Serbia	Marko Mandić (on loan to Bečej)
23	MF	Serbia	Nemanja Subotić (to (Slovakia) Sereď)
99	FW	Serbia	Stefan Mihajlović (to Rad)
32	GK	Serbia	Marko Ilić (to Voždovac)
34	FW	Serbia	Miloš Zličić (on loan to Cement, was on loan at ČSK Čelarevo)
—	DF	Serbia	Đorđe Knežević (on loan to Kabel, was loan at Radnički Zrenjanin)
—		Serbia	Tadija Dimić (to Radnički Svilajnac)
—	FW	Serbia	Milutin Miletić (to Srbobran, was on loan at Cement Beočin)
8	MF	Serbia	Lazar Zličić (to Voždovac)
—	MF	Serbia	Kristijan Živković (on loan to Jagodina Tabane, was on loan at ČSK Čelarevo)
3	DF	Serbia	Mladen Devetak (on loan to Kabel, was loan at ČSK Čelarevo)
7	MF	Canada	Stefan Cebara (released)

=== Radnik Surdulica ===
In: Note: Flags indicate national team as defined under FIFA eligibility rules; some limited exceptions apply. Players may hold more than one non-FIFA nationality.

No.	Pos.	Nation	Player
20	DF	Albania	Faton Xhemaili (loan return from Budućnost Popovac)
8	MF	Serbia	Filip Stojanović (from (Bosnia and Herzegovina) Radnik Bijeljina)
26	FW	Serbia	Miloš Stanković (from Voždovac)
25	MF	North Macedonia	Zoran Danoski (from (North Macedonia) Pobeda)
15	DF	Serbia	Predrag Đorđević (from Novi Pazar)
5	DF	Serbia	Dušan Stevanović (from Dinamo Vranje)
16	MF	Serbia	Bojan Bojić (from Partizan)
9	FW	Montenegro	Stefan Nikolić (from (Albania) Partizani)
28	MF	Serbia	Nikola Kovačević (from (Latvia) Spartaks Jūrmala)
24	MF	Greece	Andreas Dermitzakis (from (Greece) AEL)
23	MF	Serbia	Filip Stanisavljević (from (Greece) Platanias)
19	MF	Serbia	Milan Stojanović (from (Kazakhstan) Shakhter Karagandy)

Out: Note: Flags indicate national team as defined under FIFA eligibility rules; some limited exceptions apply. Players may hold more than one non-FIFA nationality.

No.	Pos.	Nation	Player
26	DF	Serbia	Aleksandar Tanasin (to Proleter Novi Sad)
24	MF	Serbia	Vuk Mitošević (to (Hungary) Kisvárda)
8	FW	Serbia	Milan Stojanović (to Budućnost Popovac)
5	DF	Serbia	Filip Ivanović (to (Azerbaijan) Sabah)
23	MF	Serbia	Pavle Propadalo (to Dinamo Vranje)
15	MF	Serbia	Dragomir Vukobratović (to Proleter Novi Sad)
19	FW	Serbia	Vladimir Stefanović (to Moravac Mrštane)
25	FW	Serbia	Krsta Đorđević (to Žarkovo)
18	FW	Serbia	Iljasa Zulfiu (to Flamurtari Pristina, was on loan at Ozren)
—	FW	Serbia	Nasuf Ibrahimi (to Tërnoci)
—	MF	Serbia	Marko Stojiljković (on loan to Pukovac)
28	MF	Serbia	Dušan Trajković (on loan to Pukovac)
16	FW	Serbia	Jovan Jovanović (to Kolubara)
21	MF	Serbia	Nikola Žakula (to Mačva Šabac)

=== Mladost Lučani ===
In: Note: Flags indicate national team as defined under FIFA eligibility rules; some limited exceptions apply. Players may hold more than one non-FIFA nationality.

No.	Pos.	Nation	Player
3	DF	Serbia	Marko Jevremović (loan return from Sloga Požega)
55	DF	Serbia	Miloš Ristić (loan return from Sloga Požega)
21		Serbia	Despot Obrenović (from LFK Mladost Lučani)
33		Serbia	Lazar Selenić (from LFK Mladost Lučani)
5	MF	Serbia	Jovan Markoski (from Napredak Kruševac)
—	MF	Serbia	Marko Stanić (from Zlatibor Čajetina, to youth team)
35	DF	Serbia	Nikola Leković (from (Greece) Kerkyra)

Out: Note: Flags indicate national team as defined under FIFA eligibility rules; some limited exceptions apply. Players may hold more than one non-FIFA nationality.

No.	Pos.	Nation	Player
44	DF	Serbia	Bogdan Milošević (to (France) Stade Laval)
88	MF	Serbia	Stefan Milosavljević (to (North Macedonia) Sileks)
—	FW	Serbia	Kristijan Đurđević (to Lokomotiva Železnik, was on loan at Radnički Obrenovac)
14	FW	Serbia	Miloš Trifunović (to (Uzbekistan) AGMK)
21	DF	Serbia	Stefan Jovanović (to Bačka BP)
—	MF	Serbia	Srđan Todorović (to Crvena Zvezda MML, was on loan at BASK)
9	MF	Serbia	Igor Savić (to Metalac G. M.)
26	DF	Serbia	Slavko Marić (to Mačva Šabac)
32	MF	Serbia	Danko Kiković (on loan to Inđija)
98	FW	Serbia	Marko Kilibarda (on loan to Radnički Beograd, was on loan at Sloga Požega)
—	FW	Serbia	Ivan Plazinić (was on loan, now signed with LFK Mladost Lučani)
16	DF	Serbia	Strahinja Vasić (to LFK Mladost Lučani)
6	DF	Serbia	Đorđe Milekić (to LFK Mladost Lučani)
—	FW	Serbia	Nikola Pantović (to FAP, was on loan at LFK Mladost Lučani)
—	MF	Serbia	Filip Bugarčić (to BSK Borča, was on loan at LFK Mladost Lučani)
—	DF	Serbia	Milutin Bugarčić (to BSK Borča, was on loan at LFK Mladost Lučani)
16	DF	Serbia	Nemanja Mićević (on loan to LFK Mladost Lučani, previously brought from the same club)
99	MF	Serbia	Veljko Kijevčanin (on loan to LFK Mladost Lučani, previously brought from the same club)
12	FW	Serbia	Đorđe Babić (on loan to LFK Mladost Lučani, was on loan at Sloboda Užice)
45	FW	Serbia	Stefan Tešić (on loan to LFK Mladost Lučani, previously brought from the same club)
19	FW	Serbia	Filip Protić (to Polet Ljubić)
24	FW	Senegal	Badara Badji (to Inđija)
58	FW	Cameroon	Michel Vaillant (on loan to Trayal)
—	DF	Serbia	Bojan Mlađović (to Metalac G. M, previously brought from Inđija)
29	DF	Serbia	Marko Basarić (to LFK Mladost Lučani)

=== Zemun ===
In: Note: Flags indicate national team as defined under FIFA eligibility rules; some limited exceptions apply. Players may hold more than one non-FIFA nationality.

No.	Pos.	Nation	Player
23	GK	Montenegro	Nemanja Šćekić (from Javor Ivanjica)
6	MF	North Macedonia	Miloš Tošeski (from Brodarac)
21	DF	Serbia	Strahinja Bošnjak (on loan from Partizan)
27	MF	Serbia	Nikola Stojković (from Metalac G. M.)
12	DF	Serbia	Đorđe Bašanović (from Čukarički)
10	MF	Lithuania	Daniel Romanovskij (from (Lithuania) Žalgiris)
15	DF	Montenegro	Emir Azemović (from (Slovenia) Domžale)
9	MF	Montenegro	Filip Kukuličić (from (Montenegro) Iskra Danilovgrad)
—	MF	Serbia	Blagota Marković (from Red Star Belgrade, to youth team)
—	DF	Serbia	Andrej Đorđev (from Partizan, to youth team)
14	FW	Namibia	Hendrik Somaeb (from (Namibia) Blue Waters)
—	FW	Montenegro	Ljubomir Kovačević (from (Montenegro) Igalo)
19	FW	Bosnia and Herzegovina	Momčilo Mrkaić (on loan from Javor Ivanjica)
—		Serbia	Jovan Velev (from Voždovac, to youth team)
11	DF	Serbia	Stefan Živković (from (Kazakhstan) Atyrau)
95	MF	Bosnia and Herzegovina	Dejan Maksimović (from (Croatia) Istra 1961)
55	DF	Serbia	Slavko Lukić (from (Uzbekistan) Nasaf)
26	MF	Serbia	Nemanja Tomić (from (Greece) Trikala)

Out: Note: Flags indicate national team as defined under FIFA eligibility rules; some limited exceptions apply. Players may hold more than one non-FIFA nationality.

No.	Pos.	Nation	Player
55	DF	Serbia	Nikola Petković (to (Thailand) Police Tero)
14	MF	Lithuania	Justas Lasickas (loan return to (Lithuania) Žalgiris)
7	MF	Serbia	Elmir Asani (to (Austria) Mauerwerk)
9	FW	Serbia	Dejan Đenić (to Spartak Subotica)
23	GK	Serbia	Srđan Ostojić (to (Indonesia) Arema)
28	MF	Bosnia and Herzegovina	Nenad Kiso (to Čukarički)
27	MF	Serbia	Nikša Stojanović (to Dinamo Pančevo)
10	MF	Serbia	Veljko Simić (to Red Star Belgrade)
—	MF	Serbia	Bogdan Mirić (to Internacional, was on loan at Lokomotiva Beograd)
11	MF	Serbia	Nikola Cuckić (to Javor Ivanjica)
—	MF	Serbia	Andreja Stojanović (to OFK Beograd)
—		Serbia	Nemanja Stevanović (on loan to GSP Polet Dorćol)
—		Serbia	Nikola Rajković (on loan to GSP Polet Dorćol)
—	GK	Serbia	Predrag Kovačević (on loan to BSK Batajnica, was on loan at Bežanija)
—		Serbia	Stefan Pavić (loan extension to Milutinac)
—	GK	Serbia	Marko Blagojević (on loan to Stepojevac Vaga, was on loan at Sloga PM)
4	DF	Serbia	Lazar Kalajanović (to Sloga Požega)
—		Serbia	Aleksa Antić (on loan to Dunav Stari Banovci)
26	MF	Serbia	Ivan Rogač (to Inđija, previously brought from the same club)
—	FW	Serbia	Nikola Savić (on loan to Vranjska Banja)
6	MF	Serbia	Strahinja Bosanac (to Brodarac, was on loan at Sloboda Užice)
4	MF	North Korea	So Hyon-uk (to (Albania) Partizani Tirana, previously brought from (Bosnia and Herzegovina) Zrinjski)
13	MF	Japan	Takuya Murayama (released, previously brought from (Thailand) Ratchaburi)

=== Mačva Šabac ===
In: Note: Flags indicate national team as defined under FIFA eligibility rules; some limited exceptions apply. Players may hold more than one non-FIFA nationality.

No.	Pos.	Nation	Player
41	GK	Serbia	Jovan Vićić (from Red Star Belgrade)
30	MF	Serbia	Aleksandar Stevanović (from (Montenegro) Zeta)
10	MF	Serbia	Dejan Babić (from (Bosnia and Herzegovina) Vitez)
14	FW	Serbia	Đorđe Šušnjar (from (Belarus) Torpedo Minsk)
7	DF	Serbia	Slavko Marić (from Mladost Lučani)
88	GK	Serbia	Miloš Savić (from Dunav Prahovo)
—		Serbia	Stefan Trimanović (from Red Star Belgrade, to youth team)
95	MF	Serbia	Mladen Lukić (from Proleter Novi Sad)
23	MF	Serbia	Nikola Ilić (from Proleter Novi Sad)
21	MF	Serbia	Nikola Žakula (from Radnik Surdulica)
70	FW	Serbia	Aleksandar Đoković (from (Armenia) Banants)
77	MF	Serbia	Stefan Milosavljević (from (North Macedonia) Sileks)
16	MF	Australia	Andrew Marveggio (from (Germany) TSG Neustrelitz)
17	MF	Bosnia and Herzegovina	Nikola Kosanić (from (Germany) Eintracht Braunschweig)

Out: Note: Flags indicate national team as defined under FIFA eligibility rules; some limited exceptions apply. Players may hold more than one non-FIFA nationality.

No.	Pos.	Nation	Player
1	GK	Serbia	Nenad Filipović (to TSC)
7	MF	Serbia	Filip Arsenijević (to TSC)
10	MF	Serbia	Nikola Milinković (to (Uzbekistan) Sogdiana Jizzakh)
—	MF	Serbia	Igor Vasić (to Mačva Bogatić)
9	FW	Serbia	Bojan Matić (to (South Korea) FC Seoul)
23	DF	Serbia	David Hrubik (to (Slovenia) Rudar Velenje)
—	DF	Serbia	Nikola Vasić (released, was on loan at Provo)
—	DF	Serbia	Darko Isailović (was on loan, now signed with Provo)
—		Serbia	Marko Ćosić (to Trešnjevka Trbušac)
—	DF	Serbia	Nemanja Živković (to OFK Beograd, was on loan at Jedinstvo Putevi)
—	FW	Serbia	Luka Nestorović (to Loznica)
29	MF	Serbia	Marko Đurišić (to Dinamo Vranje)
—	MF	Serbia	Dušan Nikolić (loan extension to Provo)
—	DF	Serbia	Vladimir Tomić (on loan to Jedinstvo Ub, was on loan at Železničar Lajkovac)
15	MF	Serbia	Matija Miketić (on loan to Sloboda Užice)
—	DF	Serbia	Miloš Polić (to Radnički Šabački)
38	GK	Serbia	Lazar Šarenac (on loan to Bežanija)
—	DF	Serbia	Nikola Popović (loan extension to Cement)
—	MF	Serbia	Milan Popović (on loan to Drina Ljubovija)
63	FW	Serbia	Lazar Vladisavljević (on loan to Budućnost Dobanovci)
28	MF	Serbia	Đorđe Belić (on loan to Drina Ljubovija)
45	MF	Bosnia and Herzegovina	Filip Božić (on loan to Sloga Požega)
—		Serbia	Marko Marković (to Radnički Šabački)
—		Serbia	Dragan Prodanović (on loan to Radnički Šabački)
—	FW	Serbia	Miloš Marinković (to OFK Šabac)
—	FW	Serbia	Dušan Brus (to Podrinje Mačvanska Mitrovica)
—	DF	Serbia	Filip Milivojević (to Provo)

=== Rad ===
In: Note: Flags indicate national team as defined under FIFA eligibility rules; some limited exceptions apply. Players may hold more than one non-FIFA nationality.

No.	Pos.	Nation	Player
29	FW	Serbia	Veljko Trifunović (loan return from Žarkovo)
22	MF	Serbia	Aleksandar Busnić (loan return from Bežanija)
—	FW	Montenegro	Božidar Damjanović (loan return from (Croatia) Segesta)
44	MF	Serbia	Filip Bainović (was on loan, now signed from Red Star Belgrade)
47	FW	Serbia	Stefan Mihajlović (from Vojvodina)
27	MF	Serbia	Dušan Živković (free, last with Radnički Niš)
86	DF	Serbia	Miloš Marković (from Borac Čačak)
9	FW	Montenegro	Filip Kasalica (from (Greece) Platanias)
—		Serbia	Nemanja Kozić (from Internacional)
—	MF	Serbia	Luka Dimitrijević (from Čukarički)
1	GK	Serbia	Rastko Šuljagić (from Bačka BP)
5	DF	Serbia	Miloš Tanović (from Budućnost Dobanovci)
19	FW	Serbia	Borko Veselinović (from Zlatibor Čajetina)
31	GK	Serbia	Mijat Trifunović (from (Slovakia) Detva)
—	FW	Switzerland	Dejan Subotić (from (Romania) Oțelul Galați)
4	DF	Brazil	Zé Marcos (loan extension from Red Star Belgrade)

Out: Note: Flags indicate national team as defined under FIFA eligibility rules; some limited exceptions apply. Players may hold more than one non-FIFA nationality.

No.	Pos.	Nation	Player
—	MF	Canada	Luka Gluščević (to (Canada) West Virginia Chaos)
12	GK	Serbia	Nemanja Stevanović (loan return to Partizan)
14	MF	Serbia	Veljko Birmančević (loan return to Partizan)
31	FW	Serbia	Darko Bjedov (loan return to (Belgium) Gent)
1	GK	Bosnia and Herzegovina	Darko Dejanović (to (Bosnia and Herzegovina) Zvijezda 09)
9	FW	Serbia	Lazar Veselinović (to Proleter Novi Sad)
27	FW	Serbia	Lazar Milošev (to Budućnost Dobanovci)
3	DF	Montenegro	Vladimir Volkov (to (Cyprus) Ermis Aradippou)
19	DF	Serbia	Strahinja Tanasijević (was on loan, now signed with (Italy) Chievo)
5	MF	Serbia	Strahinja Karišić (to Partizan)
22	DF	Serbia	Marko Mijailović (to Bežanija)
88	DF	Montenegro	Žarko Grbović (to (Montenegro) Sutjeska Nikšić)
—	FW	Serbia	Luka Mihajlović (to Budućnost Dobanovci, was on loan at Omladinac Novi Banovci)
—	FW	Montenegro	Boško Guzina (to Teleoptik, was on loan at Bežanija)
10	MF	Serbia	Đorđe Denić (to (Norway) Rosenborg)
—		Serbia	Nikola Radisavljević (on loan to Železničar Pančevo)
—	MF	Serbia	Živorad Arnautović (on loan to Dinamo Pančevo, previously brought from Čukarički)
—	MF	Serbia	Marko Džodan (on loan to Prva Iskra)
—	MF	Russia	Semen Sheptitskiy (to (Bulgaria) Montana)
—		Serbia	Aleksa Bajović (to GSP Polet Dorćol)
—	DF	Serbia	Filip Milićević (to Zvezdara)
—	MF	Serbia	Stefan Levićanin (on loan to Vršac)
20	MF	Serbia	Nedeljko Piščević (on loan to Sinđelić Beograd)
88	GK	Serbia	Danijel Mićanović (on loan to Zvezdara)
—	DF	Serbia	Cvijetin Stevanović (to Rakovica)
—	FW	South Korea	Hwang Jong-won (on loan to Radnički Kragujevac)
21	MF	Serbia	Veljko Roganović (loan extension to Omladinac Novi Banovci)
99	FW	Serbia	Dejan Parađina (on loan to Bežanija)

=== Bačka BP ===
In: Note: Flags indicate national team as defined under FIFA eligibility rules; some limited exceptions apply. Players may hold more than one non-FIFA nationality.

No.	Pos.	Nation	Player
9	MF	Serbia	Milan Makarić (from (Bosnia and Herzegovina) Zvijezda 09)
15	FW	Serbia	Aleksandar Katanić (from Dunav Stari Banovci)
23	FW	Serbia	Milan Spremo (from (Uzbekistan) Kokand 1912)
11	MF	Serbia	Nemanja Mladenović (from (Greece) AEL)
19	MF	Serbia	Srđan Grabež (from Srbobran)
16	MF	Serbia	Marko Pantić (from Spartak Subotica)
27	MF	Serbia	Nebojša Gavrić (from Voždovac)
1	GK	Montenegro	Bojan Zogović (from Metalac Gornji Milanovac)
26	DF	Serbia	Aleksandar Kostić (from Red Star Belgrade)
5	DF	Serbia	Ivan Šubert (from Novi Pazar)
17	FW	Serbia	Željko Arsić (from IMT)
—		Serbia	Miloš Dražić (from BSK Bački Brestovac)
13	DF	Serbia	Stefan Jovanović (from Mladost Lučani)
12	GK	Serbia	Aleksa Milojević (from Jagodina)
21	MF	Serbia	Lazar Kojić (on loan from (Netherlands) Fortuna Sittard)
22	MF	Serbia	Stefan Cvetković (on loan from Red Star Belgrade)
—		Serbia	Pero Tešić (from (Bosnia and Herzegovina) Lokomotiva Brčko, to youth team)

Out: Note: Flags indicate national team as defined under FIFA eligibility rules; some limited exceptions apply. Players may hold more than one non-FIFA nationality.

No.	Pos.	Nation	Player
7	FW	Montenegro	Nikola Zvrko (to (Montenegro) Iskra Danilovgrad)
15	DF	Serbia	Aleksandar Tasić (to Dinamo Vranje)
27	MF	Serbia	Nikola Dimitrijević (to (Slovakia) ViOn Zlaté Moravce)
11	MF	Serbia	Luka Luković (to (Belgium) Mouscron)
30	DF	Serbia	Boris Varga (to TSC)
29	MF	Slovenia	Timotej Dodlek (released)
19	FW	Serbia	Luka Jovanić (to Inđija)
20	MF	Serbia	Dino Šarac (to Metalac G. M.)
18	FW	Croatia	Radovan Ivković (to Hajduk Kula)
—	DF	Montenegro	Jovan Kaluđerović (released)
—	FW	Montenegro	Đorđije Spahić (to (Montenegro) Drezga)
22	FW	Bosnia and Herzegovina	Miloš Bajić (to IMT)
—	MF	Serbia	Dejan Nedinić (to Sloga Erdevik)
33	GK	Serbia	Rastko Šuljagić (to Rad)
99	GK	Serbia	Kristijan Župić (on loan to Cement)
—	MF	Serbia	Dušan Rađenović (to OFK Stari Grad)
—	GK	Serbia	Nenad Mitrović (to ČSK Čelarevo, was on loan at Radnički Šid)
—		Serbia	Ognjen Mršić (to ČSK Čelarevo)
—	DF	Serbia	Nikola Jovanović (to Dinamo Vranje)
21	MF	Serbia	Zoran Švonja (to (Bulgaria) Lokomotiv Sofia)
—		Serbia	Dino Gajdobranski (to Krila Krajine)
—		Serbia	Ognjen Međedović (to Krila Krajine)
—		Serbia	Marko Mažar (to Krila Krajine)
—	MF	United States	Simon Mršić (to (United States) Oakland Stompers)
18	MF	Montenegro	Lazar Đokić (to Dinamo Vranje, previously brought from Metalac G. M.)

=== Proleter Novi Sad ===
In: Note: Flags indicate national team as defined under FIFA eligibility rules; some limited exceptions apply. Players may hold more than one non-FIFA nationality.

No.	Pos.	Nation	Player
—	DF	Serbia	Miloš Rajačić (loan return from Sirig)
1	GK	Serbia	Vladan Elesin (from ČSK Čelarevo)
26	DF	Serbia	Aleksandar Tanasin (from Radnik Surdulica)
31	FW	Serbia	Uroš Stamenić (from Borac Čačak)
55	DF	Serbia	Miljan Jablan (free, last with (Armenia) Alashkert)
18	MF	Serbia	Dragomir Vukobratović (from Radnik Surdulica)
3	MF	Serbia	Ognjen Mitrović (from Brodarac)
90	FW	Serbia	Strahinja Jovanović (on loan from Partizan)
25	MF	Serbia	Stefan Bukorac (from (Montenegro) OFK Titograd)
24	MF	Serbia	Ognjen Krasić (from (Armenia) Banants)
84	MF	Serbia	Dušan Mićić (from Radnički Niš)
69	FW	Serbia	Srđan Vujaklija (from (South Korea) Gwangju)

Out: Note: Flags indicate national team as defined under FIFA eligibility rules; some limited exceptions apply. Players may hold more than one non-FIFA nationality.

No.	Pos.	Nation	Player
3	DF	Serbia	Dimitrije Tomović (loan return to Spartak Subotica)
17	FW	Russia	Maksim Artemchuk (loan return to (Russia) Dynamo Saint Petersburg)
16	DF	Serbia	Nikola Đurić (to Dinamo Vranje)
6	MF	Serbia	Žarko Jeličić (to Budućnost Dobanovci)
24	FW	Serbia	Zoran Mihailović (on loan to Sloboda Užice)
—	GK	Serbia	Stefan Šurlan (to RFK Novi Sad)
77	FW	Serbia	Vladimir Peralović (to Budućnost Dobanovci)
—	FW	Serbia	Lazar Veselinović (on loan to Borac Šajkaš, previously brought from Rad)
—	FW	Serbia	Bojan Ružin (to Borac Šajkaš)
—	DF	Serbia	Dejan Zeljković (on loan to ČSK Čelarevo, was on loan at Mladost Bački Petrovac)
—		Serbia	Dejan Karać (to Crvena Zvezda NS)
15	DF	Serbia	Mihajlo Ivančević (to Brodarac, previously brought from the same club)
—	DF	Serbia	Dejan Đurić (to Brodarac)
99	GK	North Macedonia	Nikola Tošeski (to Smederevo)
—	MF	Serbia	Vladimir Ilić (on loan to Kabel, was on loan at Cement Beočin)
—	DF	Serbia	Goran Švonja (to Futog, was on loan at (Canada) Serbian White Eagles)
—	DF	Serbia	Dejan Peković (was on loan, now signed with Cement Beočin)
—	FW	Serbia	Miloš Manojlović (was on loan, now signed with Bačka 1901)
—	FW	Serbia	Luka Bošković (loan extension to Šećeranac Ada)
95	MF	Serbia	Mladen Lukić (to Mačva Šabac)
20	MF	Serbia	Nikola Ilić (to Mačva Šabac)
22	FW	North Macedonia	Strahinja Krstevski (to (Bulgaria) Lokomotiv Sofia)

=== Dinamo Vranje ===
In: Note: Flags indicate national team as defined under FIFA eligibility rules; some limited exceptions apply. Players may hold more than one non-FIFA nationality.

No.	Pos.	Nation	Player
—	MF	Serbia	Aleksandar Jović (loan return from Moravac Mrštane)
30	DF	Serbia	Filip Pavišić (from Sinđelić Beograd)
14	DF	Serbia	Nikola Đurić (from Proleter Novi Sad)
13	DF	Serbia	Nikola Jovanović (from Bačka BP)
9	FW	Serbia	Željko Dimitrov (from Radnički Pirot)
26	MF	Serbia	Milosav Sićović (from Internacional)
2	DF	Serbia	Vladimir Ilić (from Internacional)
22	FW	Serbia	Marko Radivojević (from Trstenik PPT)
45	MF	Serbia	Dušan Lalatović (on loan from Radnički Niš)
29	FW	Cameroon	Ferdinand Fru Fon (from Temnić)
21	GK	Serbia	Nikola Lakić (from (Bosnia and Herzegovina) Zvijezda 09)
19	FW	Serbia	Luka Ratković (from (Montenegro) OFK Titograd)
8	MF	Serbia	Marko Đurišić (from Mačva Šabac)
5	DF	Serbia	Nikola Stevanović (on loan from Radnički Niš)
24	DF	Brazil	Taigo (from (Brazil) Paraná)
25	MF	Serbia	Marko Stanojević (from Napredak Kruševac)
33	MF	Serbia	Pavle Propadalo (from Radnik Surdulica)
6	MF	Serbia	Božidar Veškovac (from OFK Beograd)
—	GK	Serbia	Ognjen Ristić (from Vranjska Banja)
15	DF	Serbia	Danijel Gašić (from (Germany) TSV Kottern, previously sold to the same club)
12	MF	Montenegro	Lazar Đokić (from Bačka BP)
28	MF	Serbia	Miloš Jokić (from (Greece) Doxa Drama)

Out: Note: Flags indicate national team as defined under FIFA eligibility rules; some limited exceptions apply. Players may hold more than one non-FIFA nationality.

No.	Pos.	Nation	Player
13	FW	Serbia	Lazar Ranđelović (loan return to Radnički Niš)
8	FW	Serbia	Luka Stojanović (to Kolubara)
5	DF	Serbia	Dušan Stevanović (to Radnik Surdulica)
—		Serbia	Dejan Stojiljković (released)
12	MF	Serbia	Nemanja Milovanović (to Javor Ivanjica)
1	GK	Serbia	Dragan Cakić (on loan to Moravac Mrštane)
—	DF	Serbia	Stefan Đorđević (to Pčinja Trgovište)
—	DF	Serbia	Predrag Petošević (to Jedinstvo Surčin)
—	FW	Serbia	Milan Petošević (to Jedinstvo Surčin)
26	MF	Serbia	Zoran Šćepanović (to Borac Sakule)
30	FW	Serbia	Nikola Milanović (to Borac Sakule)
50	GK	Montenegro	Boris Božović (to Bežanija)
5	DF	Serbia	Aleksandar Tasić (to Zlatibor Čajetina, previously brought from Bačka BP)
—	MF	Serbia	Nemanja Stanisavljević (to (Austria) Haitzendorf)
—	MF	Serbia	Luka Arsenović (to Car Konstantin, was on loan at Vranjska Banja)
—	DF	Serbia	Nemanja Gorčić (on loan to Dubočica, was on loan at Moravac Mrštane)
14	FW	Serbia	Marko Hristić (on loan to Vranjska Banja)
18	DF	Serbia	Ljubo Baranin (to Kolubara)
—	FW	Serbia	Nikola Stošić (on loan to Radnički Svilajnac, was on loan at Jedinstvo Bošnjace)
—	GK	Serbia	Goran Ristić (to Vranjska Banja)
—	MF	Serbia	Veljko Antonijević (to Sloboda Užice)
17	DF	North Macedonia	Nikola Stojanović (to Levosoje)
18	FW	Serbia	Vasilije Spasić (on loan to Jedinstvo Bošnjace)
—	DF	Serbia	Marko Bulat (to BSK Batajnica)
24	DF	Serbia	Filip Stanković (loan return to Radnički Niš)
—	DF	Serbia	Aljoša Lončar (released, previously brought from Cement)
21		Serbia	Miroslav Kostić (released)

== Serbian First League ==
=== Javor Ivanjica ===
In: Note: Flags indicate national team as defined under FIFA eligibility rules; some limited exceptions apply. Players may hold more than one non-FIFA nationality.

No.	Pos.	Nation	Player
15	DF	Serbia	Nemanja Marković (from (Switzerland) Pajde Möhlin)
7	MF	Serbia	Nemanja Milovanović (from Dinamo Vranje)
26	DF	Serbia	Jovan Marinković (from Sinđelić Niš)
6	DF	Serbia	Njegoš Bajović (from BASK)
33	MF	Serbia	Nikola Cuckić (from Zemun)
23	GK	Serbia	Nemanja Jeveričić (from Loznica)
5	MF	Serbia	Nikola Kuveljić (from Jedinstvo Surčin)

Out: Note: Flags indicate national team as defined under FIFA eligibility rules; some limited exceptions apply. Players may hold more than one non-FIFA nationality.

No.	Pos.	Nation	Player
15	DF	Serbia	Đorđe Crnomarković (to Radnički Niš)
7	MF	Brazil	Eliomar (to (Bosnia and Herzegovina) Široki Brijeg)
26	MF	Serbia	Stefan Panić (to (Latvia) Riga)
4	MF	Serbia	Milan Marčić (to Spartak Subotica)
—	FW	Serbia	Nikola Dišić (to (Germany) JSG Aarbergen, was on loan at Proleter Mihajlovac)
2	DF	North Macedonia	Filip Ristovski (to (North Macedonia) Sileks)
5	MF	Serbia	Stevan Kovačević (to Radnički Kragujevac)
3	DF	Serbia	Miloš Karišik (to (Bosnia and Herzegovina) Krupa)
18	MF	Congo	Romeni Scott Bitsindou (on loan to (Belgium) Lommel)
23	GK	Montenegro	Nemanja Šćekić (to Zemun)
31	DF	Serbia	Miljan Ilić (to Inđija)
—	MF	Serbia	Nikola Kolarević (to Budućnost Arilje)
—		Serbia	Ognjen Luković (loan extension to Brodarac)
22	FW	Bosnia and Herzegovina	Momčilo Mrkaić (on loan to Zemun)
30	DF	Serbia	Milan Milanović (released)
—	GK	Serbia	Aleksa Dodić (released, previously brought from Temnić)

=== Borac Čačak ===
In: Note: Flags indicate national team as defined under FIFA eligibility rules; some limited exceptions apply. Players may hold more than one non-FIFA nationality.

No.	Pos.	Nation	Player
12	DF	Serbia	Njegoš Janjušević (loan return from Polet Ljubić)
21	MF	Serbia	Uroš Sekulić (loan return from Polet Ljubić)
20	MF	Serbia	Stefan Fićović (loan return from Polet Ljubić)
9	MF	Serbia	Nikola Tripković (loan return from Polet Ljubić)
10	MF	Serbia	Stefan Kovačević (loan return from Polet Ljubić)

Out: Note: Flags indicate national team as defined under FIFA eligibility rules; some limited exceptions apply. Players may hold more than one non-FIFA nationality.

No.	Pos.	Nation	Player
12	FW	Serbia	Lazar Romanić (loan return to Red Star Belgrade)
33	FW	Serbia	Uroš Stamenić (to Proleter Novi Sad)
3	MF	Montenegro	Jovan Čađenović (to (Lithuania) Sūduva)
15	DF	Serbia	Miloš Perišić (to (Portugal) Farense)
14	DF	Bosnia and Herzegovina	Amer Dupovac (to (Bosnia and Herzegovina) Sarajevo)
6	DF	Serbia	Marko Marinković (to Napredak Kruševac)
19	MF	Serbia	Marko Zoćević (to Voždovac)
23	GK	Serbia	Vladimir Bajić (to (Greece) Levadiakos)
21	FW	Brazil	Mateus Lima (on loan to (Croatia) Slaven Belupo)
—	GK	Serbia	Nikola Z. Tasić (to Tutin, was on loan at Polet Ljubić)
5	DF	Serbia	Stefan Drašković (to (Montenegro) Rudar Pljevlja)
11	FW	Serbia	Miloš Džugurdić (to (Montenegro) Grbalj)
20	DF	Serbia	Miloš Marković (to Rad)
10	MF	Serbia	Nenad Lukić (to Inđija)
4	DF	Serbia	Lazar Obradović (to (Bosnia and Herzegovina) Tuzla City)
34	MF	Serbia	Saša Filipović (to (Bosnia and Herzegovina) Zvijezda 09)
1	MF	Serbia	Filip Knežević (to (Israel) Ashdod)
—	DF	Serbia	Milan Matović (to Mladost Atenica, was on loan at Polet Ljubić)

=== Metalac G. M. ===
In: Note: Flags indicate national team as defined under FIFA eligibility rules; some limited exceptions apply. Players may hold more than one non-FIFA nationality.

No.	Pos.	Nation	Player
11	FW	Serbia	Nikola Grbović (loan return from Polet Ljubić)
18	MF	Serbia	Luka Maksimović (from Voždovac)
6	DF	Serbia	Miloš Vranjanin (from Teleoptik)
14	FW	Serbia	Admir Kecap (from Novi Pazar)
23	DF	Serbia	Igor Filipović (from (North Macedonia) Sileks)
77	MF	Serbia	Dino Šarac (from Bačka BP)
25	MF	Serbia	Igor Savić (from Mladost Lučani)
33	GK	Serbia	Janko Langura (from Železničar Lajkovac)
—	GK	Serbia	Ilija Petrović (from OFK Beograd, to youth team)
30	DF	Serbia	Bojan Mlađović (from Mladost Lučani)
21	MF	Serbia	Nemanja Krstić (free, last with Borac Čačak)

Out: Note: Flags indicate national team as defined under FIFA eligibility rules; some limited exceptions apply. Players may hold more than one non-FIFA nationality.

No.	Pos.	Nation	Player
3	MF	Serbia	Milan Svojić (to (Myanmar) Shan United)
—	GK	Serbia	Marko Minić (to Sloboda Užice, was on loan at BASK)
9	FW	Serbia	Marko Rajković (to Trayal)
14	DF	Ukraine	Taras Bondarenko (to Radnički Niš)
18	DF	Serbia	Branko Jovanović (to Teleoptik)
42	GK	Montenegro	Bojan Zogović (to Bačka BP)
11	FW	Serbia	Miroslav Lečić (to (Kazakhstan) Kyzylzhar)
19	MF	Serbia	Nikola Stojković (to Zemun)
77	MF	Montenegro	Lazar Đokić (to Bačka BP)
13	FW	Serbia	Vladimir Petrović (to Zlatibor Čajetina)
—	FW	Serbia	Andrija Ratković (to Radnički Kragujevac, was on loan at Šumadija Aranđelovac)
4	DF	Serbia	Bojan Gočanin (on loan to Takovo)
—	GK	Serbia	Miloš Jokić (on loan to Prijevor)
—		Serbia	Aleksa Milićević (on loan to Lunjevica)
—	FW	Serbia	Andrija Đunisijević (was on loan, now signed with Takovo)

=== TSC ===
In: Note: Flags indicate national team as defined under FIFA eligibility rules; some limited exceptions apply. Players may hold more than one non-FIFA nationality.

No.	Pos.	Nation	Player
20	MF	Serbia	Miloš Plavšić (from Inđija)
3	DF	Serbia	Boris Varga (from Bačka BP)
17	FW	Serbia	Nebojša Bastajić (from Budućnost Dobanovci)
7	MF	Serbia	Miloš Milisavljević (from Inđija)
1	GK	Serbia	Nenad Filipović (from Mačva Šabac)
16	MF	Hungary	Norbert Pintér (from (Hungary) Szolnok)
25	MF	Serbia	Filip Arsenijević (from Mačva Šabac)

Out: Note: Flags indicate national team as defined under FIFA eligibility rules; some limited exceptions apply. Players may hold more than one non-FIFA nationality.

No.	Pos.	Nation	Player
7	FW	Serbia	Nemanja Grujić (to Bečej)
—	FW	Serbia	Peter Žemberi (to Bajša)
—	FW	Serbia	Sebastijan Sakač (to Bajša)
20	DF	Serbia	Dušan Mijić (to Hajduk Kula)
—		Serbia	Nemanja Šćepanović (to Radnički 1912)
—	FW	Serbia	Ranko Janković (to Polet Sivac)
10	MF	Serbia	Aleksandar Davidov (to Hajduk Kula)
18	FW	Serbia	Marko Stančetić (to Cement)
—	DF	Serbia	Đorđija Milić (to Njegoš Lovćenac)
—	MF	Serbia	Mihajlo Pedić (to Bajša)
22	MF	Serbia	Aleksandar Erak (on loan to Bečej)

=== Inđija ===
In: Note: Flags indicate national team as defined under FIFA eligibility rules; some limited exceptions apply. Players may hold more than one non-FIFA nationality.

No.	Pos.	Nation	Player
22	MF	Serbia	Milan Janjić (from Budućnost Dobanovci)
19	MF	Serbia	Nemanja Stojanović (from Smederevo)
9	MF	Serbia	Nenad Lukić (from Borac Čačak)
15	MF	Serbia	Dimitrije Zajić (from Dunav Prahovo)
2	MF	Serbia	Goran Smiljanić (from Bežanija)
3	DF	Serbia	Lazar Vuković (from Borac Sakule)
8	MF	Serbia	Nemanja Bosančić (from (Montenegro) Berane)
10	FW	Serbia	Nikola Mitić (free, last with Javor Ivanjica)
11	DF	Serbia	Milijan Ilić (from Javor Ivanjica)
16	MF	Serbia	Danko Kiković (on loan from Mladost Lučani)
—		Serbia	Dušan Igrač (from Jedinstavo Stara Pazova)
—		Serbia	Damir Avramović (from Jagodina)
23	MF	Serbia	Ivan Rogač (from Zemun, previously sold to the same club)
20	MF	Serbia	Nemanja Mirosavljević (from (Bosnia and Herzegovina) Krupa)
24	FW	Senegal	Badara Badji (from Mladost Lučani)
14	MF	Malta	Jamie Zerafa (on loan from (Malta) Balzan)

Out: Note: Flags indicate national team as defined under FIFA eligibility rules; some limited exceptions apply. Players may hold more than one non-FIFA nationality.

No.	Pos.	Nation	Player
4	DF	Serbia	Boško Gajić (loan return to Spartak Subotica)
20	MF	Serbia	Miloš Plavšić (to TSC)
9	FW	Serbia	Slađan Nikodijević (to Radnički Niš)
17	DF	Serbia	Bojan Kovačević (to Voždovac)
8	MF	Serbia	Miloš Milisavljević (to TSC)
11	MF	Serbia	Nemanja Lazić (to Bečej)
1	GK	Serbia	Bojan Knežević (to Budućnost Dobanovci)
10	MF	Croatia	Mile Vujasin (to Radnički Kragujevac)
14	DF	Serbia	Bojan Mlađović (to Mladost Lučani)
—	DF	Serbia	Milan Srbijanac (to Bratstvo Prigrevica, was on loan at Zlatibor Čajetina)
7	FW	Serbia	Nikola Mojsilović (to Omladinac Novi Banovci)
—		Serbia	Srđan Vučković (to Jedinstvo Stara Pazova)
—	GK	Serbia	Dušan Vojvodić (to Borac Šajkaš)
—		Serbia	Nemanja Adamović (to Sloven Ruma)
—	FW	Serbia	Nemanja Mrđa (to Železničar Inđija)
—	FW	Serbia	Stefan Ilić (to Indeks Novi Sad)
—	MF	Serbia	Nikola Unković (to Stepojevac Vaga)
—	FW	Serbia	Luka Jovanić (to Hajduk Kula, previously brought from Bačka BP)

=== Sinđelić Beograd ===
In: Note: Flags indicate national team as defined under FIFA eligibility rules; some limited exceptions apply. Players may hold more than one non-FIFA nationality.

No.	Pos.	Nation	Player
14	DF	Switzerland	Vladislav Yves (from Teleoptik)
3	DF	Serbia	Aleksa Bajičić (from Grafičar Beograd)
23		Serbia	Marko Ćirić (from Voždovac)
17	MF	Serbia	Miloš Z. Krstić (from OFK Beograd)
11	MF	Serbia	Vasilije Đurić (from OFK Beograd)
1	GK	Serbia	Marko Trkulja (free, last with (Philippines) Davao Aguilas)
25	MF	Serbia	Vasilije Janjić (on loan from Voždovac)
6	MF	Serbia	Nedeljko Piščević (on loan from Rad)
16	DF	Serbia	Nikola Valentić (free, last with (Uzbekistan) Kokand 1912)
18	FW	India	Swapnil Raj Dhaka (from (India) Jaipur FC)
15	DF	China	Tan Jiajie (from (China) Guangzhou Evergrande)
—	GK	Serbia	Danijel Dejanović (from IMT)
13		China	Lai Qirui (from (China) Sichuan Jiuniu)

Out: Note: Flags indicate national team as defined under FIFA eligibility rules; some limited exceptions apply. Players may hold more than one non-FIFA nationality.

No.	Pos.	Nation	Player
6	DF	Serbia	Filip Pavišić (to Dinamo Vranje)
19	GK	Serbia	Nikola Simić (to Vojvodina)
17	MF	Bosnia and Herzegovina	Nemanja Lekanić (to (Bosnia and Herzegovina) OFK Sloga Gornje Crnjelovo)
—	MF	Serbia	Strahinja Pavišić (to Radnički Sremska Mitrovica)
13	DF	Serbia	Miloš M. Krstić (to (Saudi Arabia) Al-Mujazzal)
16	DF	Croatia	Predrag Počuča (to (Faroe Islands) KÍ Klaksvík)
24	DF	Australia	Salvatore Russo (to (Germany) Inter Leipzig)
15	DF	Serbia	Radomir Nešić (to Sloboda Užice)
22	FW	Serbia	Bogdan Mandić (to (North Macedonia) Pobeda Prilep)
21	FW	Serbia	Dušan Vukčević (to Trstenik PPT)
20	MF	Serbia	Nemanja Obrenović (to Sloboda Užice)
—	FW	Serbia	Nikola Aleksić (to BASK)
—	DF	China	Zhang Yue (on loan to Bežanija)
24	DF	Serbia	Nikola Petrović (to Crvena Zvezda MML, previously brought from IMT)
14	FW	Serbia	Nikola Rakić (to Brodarac)
—	MF	Bosnia and Herzegovina	Esmir Ahmetović (released)

=== Bežanija ===
In: Note: Flags indicate national team as defined under FIFA eligibility rules; some limited exceptions apply. Players may hold more than one non-FIFA nationality.

No.	Pos.	Nation	Player
33	FW	North Macedonia	Nikola Bogdanovski (from Radnički Beograd)
17	MF	Montenegro	Marko Despotović (from Dunav Stari Banovci)
2	DF	Serbia	Marko Mijailović (from Rad)
15	FW	Serbia	Stefan Dacić (from BSK Batajnica)
5	MF	Serbia	Nikola Nedeljković (from Budućnost Dobanovci)
14	DF	Serbia	Nenad Milovanović (from Loznica)
12	GK	Serbia	Lazar Šarenac (on loan from Mačva Šabac)
18	FW	Serbia	Marko Simić (from (Latvia) Spartaks Jūrmala)
1	GK	Montenegro	Boris Božović (from Dinamo Vranje)
26	MF	Serbia	Veljko Selaković (from Grafičar Beograd)
—	DF	Serbia	Miloš Stojanović (from Voždovac)
—	MF	Serbia	Nikola Jovanović (from (Montenegro) Zeta)
16	FW	Serbia	Dejan Parađina (on loan from Rad)
29	FW	Ghana	Ibrahim Tanko (on loan from Red Star Belgrade)
13	DF	China	Zhang Yue (on loan from Sinđelić Beograd)

Out: Note: Flags indicate national team as defined under FIFA eligibility rules; some limited exceptions apply. Players may hold more than one non-FIFA nationality.

No.	Pos.	Nation	Player
3	MF	Serbia	Aleksandar Busnić (loan return to Rad)
7	FW	Montenegro	Boško Guzina (loan return to Rad)
13	DF	Serbia	Draško Đorđević (loan return to Red Star Belgrade)
14	MF	Serbia	Damjan Gojkov (loan return to Red Star Belgrade)
—	GK	Serbia	Miško Imro (to (Slovakia) Rača Bratislava)
8	MF	Serbia	Andrej Mrkela (to (Romania) Poli Timișoara)
2	DF	Bosnia and Herzegovina	Saša Kolunija (to (Kazakhstan) Caspiy)
20	FW	Serbia	Nenad Perović (to Radnički Sremska Mitrovica)
18	MF	Serbia	Goran Smiljanić (to Inđija)
—		Serbia	Aleksa Nedeljković (to Sremac Vojka)
—		Serbia	Nikodin Ralević (to GSP Polet Dorćol)
—	MF	Serbia	Luka Sekulić (on loan to Sremčica, was on loan at Jedinstvo Surčin)
16	DF	Serbia	Stefan Javorac (to Dunav Stari Banovci)
12	GK	Serbia	Predrag Kovačević (loan return to Zemun)
—	MF	Serbia	Andrija Mihajlović (to Dunav Stari Banovci)
1	GK	Armenia	Artem Karapetyan (to (Armenia) Junior Sevan)
10	MF	Serbia	Stefan Matijević (to Kolubara)
—	DF	Serbia	Đorđe Vidić (to Jedinstvo Surčin)

=== Teleoptik ===
In: Note: Flags indicate national team as defined under FIFA eligibility rules; some limited exceptions apply. Players may hold more than one non-FIFA nationality.

No.	Pos.	Nation	Player
11	FW	Serbia	Stefan Đurić (was on loan, now signed from Partizan)
23	DF	Serbia	Marko Simunović (from Partizan)
22	FW	Serbia	Nikola Lakčević (loan extension from Partizan)
19		Serbia	Milan Ilić (from GSP Polet Dorćol)
20	MF	Serbia	Marko Jerotijević (from Jedinstvo Surčin)
15	DF	Serbia	Branko Jovanović (from Metalac G. M.)
28	DF	Serbia	Lazar Petrović (from GSP Polet Dorćol)
14	MF	Burkina Faso	Dramane Salou (on loan from Partizan)
2	DF	Serbia	Jovan Vlalukin (loan extension from Partizan)
3	DF	Serbia	Filip Antonijević (from Partizan)
41	GK	Serbia	Aleksandar Popović (on loan from Partizan)
21	FW	Montenegro	Boško Guzina (from Rad)
5	DF	Serbia	Filip Matović (from GSP Polet Dorćol)
29	MF	Serbia	Strahinja Karišić (on loan from Partizan)
32	DF	Montenegro	Ognjen Peličić (on loan from Partizan)
25	DF	Bosnia and Herzegovina	Nemanja Vještica (on loan from Partizan)

Out: Note: Flags indicate national team as defined under FIFA eligibility rules; some limited exceptions apply. Players may hold more than one non-FIFA nationality.

No.	Pos.	Nation	Player
—	MF	Serbia	Jovan Nišić (loan return to Partizan)
—	MF	Serbia	Filip Jović (loan return to Partizan)
—	DF	Montenegro	Peđa Savić (loan return to Partizan)
—	DF	Serbia	Adnan Islamović (loan return to Partizan)
—		Serbia	Dragan Čubra (loan return to Partizan)
—	DF	Serbia	Zlatan Šehović (loan return to Partizan)
—	DF	Serbia	Nikola Mirić (loan return to Partizan)
—	DF	Serbia	Miloš Vranjanin (to Metalac G. M.)
—	MF	Montenegro	Petar Sekulović (to (Montenegro) Mladost Lješkopolje)
—	DF	Serbia	Strahinja Kojić (to (Slovakia) ŠK Tomášov)
—	DF	Switzerland	Vladislav Yves (to Sinđelić Beograd)
—	FW	Serbia	Sreten Popović (to Srbobran)
—	DF	Serbia	Suzan Ilijazi (to Budućnost Zvečka)
—	FW	Serbia	Đorđe Ivković (to Stepojevac Vaga)

=== Novi Pazar ===
In: Note: Flags indicate national team as defined under FIFA eligibility rules; some limited exceptions apply. Players may hold more than one non-FIFA nationality.

No.	Pos.	Nation	Player
3	DF	Serbia	Ermin Ibrahimović (loan return from Tutin)

Out: Note: Flags indicate national team as defined under FIFA eligibility rules; some limited exceptions apply. Players may hold more than one non-FIFA nationality.

No.	Pos.	Nation	Player
11	MF	Serbia	Mehmed Avdić (to (Spain) Coruxo)
14	FW	Serbia	Admir Kecap (to Metalac G. M.)
20	MF	Serbia	Denis Ristov (to Radnički Pirot)
15	DF	Serbia	Stefan Marković (to Radnički Pirot)
5	DF	Serbia	Ivan Šubert (to Bačka BP)
33	DF	Serbia	Denis Biševac (to (Bosnia and Herzegovina) Velež Mostar)
2	DF	Serbia	Predrag Đorđević (to Radnik Surdulica)
3	DF	Serbia	Luka Šarac (to Sloboda Užice)
27	GK	Serbia	Jasmin Koč (to Sloboda Užice)
—	FW	Serbia	Sead Hadžibulić (was on loan, now signed with Jošanica)
17	DF	Serbia	Vahid Zimonjić (to Jošanica)
10	MF	Serbia	Marko Vučetić (to Sloboda Užice)
7	MF	Serbia	Irfan Vusljanin (to (North Macedonia) Belasica)
18	MF	Serbia	Uroš Stepanović (to Trayal)

=== Budućnost Dobanovci ===
In: Note: Flags indicate national team as defined under FIFA eligibility rules; some limited exceptions apply. Players may hold more than one non-FIFA nationality.

No.	Pos.	Nation	Player
10	MF	Serbia	Žarko Jeličić (from Proleter Novi Sad)
12	GK	Serbia	Bojan Knežević (from Inđija)
6	DF	Serbia	Vladimir Maksimović (from Omladinac Novi Banovci)
14	MF	Serbia	Mihajlo Oreščanin (from Voždovac)
8	FW	Serbia	Vladimir Peralović (from Proleter Novi Sad)
20	FW	Serbia	Lazar Milošev (from Rad)
2	FW	Serbia	Luka Mihajlović (from Rad)
11	FW	Serbia	Milorad Dabić (from (Czech Republic) Vyškov)
15	FW	Serbia	Miloš Kukolj (loan extension from Partizan)
3	DF	Bosnia and Herzegovina	Milenko Malović (from (Sweden) Varbergs)
19	MF	Serbia	Nemanja Vidić (free, last with (Malaysia) Negeri Sembilan)
22	FW	Serbia	Lazar Vladisavljević (on loan from Mačva Šabac)
18	FW	Nigeria	Emeka Emerun (free, last with Radnički Pirot)

Out: Note: Flags indicate national team as defined under FIFA eligibility rules; some limited exceptions apply. Players may hold more than one non-FIFA nationality.

No.	Pos.	Nation	Player
11	FW	Serbia	Nebojša Bastajić (to TSC)
18	MF	Serbia	Aleksa Matić (to Spartak Subotica)
—	GK	Serbia	Goran Čokorilo (to (Bosnia and Herzegovina) Sloboda Tuzla)
8	MF	Serbia	Milan Janjić (to Inđija)
20	MF	Serbia	David Dujić (to Bečej)
6	DF	Serbia	Miodrag Đušić (to Jedinstvo Surčin)
—	DF	Serbia	Nemanja Jeftić (to Crvena Zvezda MML)
14	MF	Serbia	Ninoslav Nikolić (to Smederevo)
—	MF	Serbia	Nikola Nedeljković (to Bežanija)
—	GK	Serbia	Nikola Jadranin (to Radnički Obrenovac)
10	MF	Serbia	Nikola Kokir (to BSK Batajnica)
—	MF	Serbia	Stefan Lazarević (to Dunav Stari Banovci)
—		Serbia	Nazif Sali (to Šumadinac Bečmen)
—		Serbia	Senad Sojeva (to Šumadinac Bečmen)
3	DF	Serbia	Miloš Tanović (to Rad)
—		Serbia	Nikola Eraković (on loan to Radnički Sutjeska)
18	MF	Serbia	Nemanja Kruševac (to Trayal)
—	MF	Serbia	Milan Zorica (to (Italy) Ponsacco)

=== Radnički Kragujevac ===
In: Note: Flags indicate national team as defined under FIFA eligibility rules; some limited exceptions apply. Players may hold more than one non-FIFA nationality.

No.	Pos.	Nation	Player
—	DF	Serbia	Bojan Andrić (loan return from Šumadija 1903)
25	DF	Serbia	Goran Milojević (loan return from Sušica)
—	DF	Serbia	Miloš Lazarević (loan return from Sušica)
—		Serbia	Luka Marković (loan return from Šumadija 1903)
—		Serbia	Matija Stojanović (loan return from Šumadija 1903)
13	DF	Serbia	Aleksa Todorović (from Šumadija 1903)
11	MF	Croatia	Mile Vujasin (from Inđija)
19	FW	Serbia	Andrija Ratković (from Metalac G. M.)
1	GK	Serbia	Borivoje Rumenić (from Karađorđe Topola)
6	DF	Bosnia and Herzegovina	Milan Lalić (from Radnički Nova Pazova)
26	DF	Serbia	Uroš Zlatović (from Radnički Nova Pazova)
21	DF	Serbia	Nemanja Zdravković (from Radnički Nova Pazova)
7	FW	Serbia	Tomislav Todorović (from Radnički Nova Pazova)
4	MF	Serbia	Filip Markišić (from Radnički Nova Pazova)
8	FW	Serbia	Aleksandar Dimitrić (from Radnički Nova Pazova)
27	FW	Serbia	Stefan Arsenijević (from Smederevo)
25	FW	Serbia	Slavko Cvijetinović (from Radnički Nova Pazova)
—	GK	Serbia	Nikola Sremčević (from Čukarički, to youth team)
28	FW	South Korea	Hwang Jong-won (on loan from Rad)
24	MF	Serbia	Stevan Kovačević (from Javor Ivanjica)

Out: Note: Flags indicate national team as defined under FIFA eligibility rules; some limited exceptions apply. Players may hold more than one non-FIFA nationality.

No.	Pos.	Nation	Player
8	FW	Serbia	Nenad Đurđević (to Žarkovo)
21	DF	Serbia	Aleksandar Dragačević (to Zlatibor Čajetina)
7	MF	Serbia	Igor Vićentijević (to Budućnost Krušik)
13	MF	Serbia	Petar Gavrović (to Budućnost Krušik)
—		Serbia	Vuk Jašović (was on loan, now signed with Šumadija Toponica)
—		Serbia	Lazar Božović (to Šumadija Toponica, was on loan at Šumadija 1903)
—		Serbia	Dušan Vučićević (to Šumadija Toponica, was on loan at Šumadija 1903)
—	MF	Serbia	Filip Aleksić (was on loan, now signed with Šumadija 1903)
—	DF	Serbia	Ljubo Nenadić (to Šumadija 1903)
—	DF	Serbia	Ivan Živanović (to Šumadija 1903)
4	DF	Serbia	Saša Marković (to Smederevo)
—	DF	Serbia	Nikola Ilić (to Mladi Radnik, was on loan at Šumadija Aranđelovac)
2	DF	Serbia	Ilija Matejević (to Radnički Beograd)
—	MF	Serbia	Vasilije Veljko Milovanović (to Sloga Petrovac na Mlavi, was on loan at FAP)
—		Serbia	Miloš Mijailović (to Šumadija 1903)
—	DF	Serbia	Dušan Stanković (to Vlasina)
—		Serbia	Stefan Milošević (on loan to Gruža, was on loan at Borac Pajsijević)
—		Serbia	Miloš Desivojević (was on loan, now signed with Marjan Knić)
28	MF	Serbia	Marko Milovanović (loan extension to Borac Pajsijević)
—	GK	Serbia	Marko Živak (on loan to Vodojaža, was on loan at Gruža)
—	MF	Serbia	Nemanja Danilović (on loan to Vodojaža)
16	MF	Serbia	Uroš Vidović (to (Canada) Brantford Galaxy)
—	DF	Serbia	Lazar Vasojević (was on loan, now signed with Sušica)
—	MF	Serbia	Miloš Erić (was on loan, now signed with Sušica)
—	MF	Serbia	Vuk Obradović (was on loan, now signed with Sušica)
—		Serbia	Nemanja Jotović (to Donja Trnava, was on loan at Šumadija 1903)
24	MF	Ghana	Stephen Appiah (to Trayal, previously brought from (Philippines) Manila Nomads)
—		Serbia	Jovan Grković (to Trstenik PPT)
—	FW	Serbia	Darko Spalević (to Zvezdara)

=== Sloboda Užice ===
In: Note: Flags indicate national team as defined under FIFA eligibility rules; some limited exceptions apply. Players may hold more than one non-FIFA nationality.

No.	Pos.	Nation	Player
30	MF	Serbia	Aleksandar Mitrović (loan return from Zlatibor Čajetina)
23	GK	Serbia	Marko Ristanović (from Budućnost Arilje)
1	GK	Serbia	Jasmin Koč (from Novi Pazar)
3	DF	Serbia	Luka Šarac (from Novi Pazar)
8	FW	Montenegro	Milovan Ilić (from (Montenegro) Igalo)
12	GK	Serbia	Marko Minić (from Metalac G. M.)
16	MF	Serbia	Nikola Lazović (from Zlatibor Čajetina)
10	MF	Serbia	Zoran Marušić (from Temnić)
11	FW	Serbia	Zoran Mihailović (on loan from Proleter Novi Sad)
19	MF	Serbia	Matija Miketić (on loan from Mačva Šabac)
20	MF	Serbia	Uroš Filipović (from Radnički Pirot)
9	FW	Cameroon	Simon Tjeck Migne (from (Cameroon) Astres)
25	FW	Nigeria	Livinus Okorie (free)
2	DF	Nigeria	Gideon Kadiri (free)
17	DF	Croatia	Nikola Gavrić (from (Malta) Sliema Wanderers)
21	FW	Serbia	Marko Rajković (from Trayal)
24	MF	Serbia	Marko Vučetić (from Novi Pazar)
13	FW	Serbia	Dean Tišma (from Žarkovo)
31	MF	Serbia	Nemanja Obrenović (from Sinđelić Beograd)
6	MF	Nigeria	Nnaemeka Ajuru (from Jagodina)
—		Serbia	Luka Vulević (from Polimlje)
27	FW	Serbia	Stefan Torbica (from (Slovenia) Maribor)
26	MF	Serbia	Nikola Trifković (from ČSK Čelarevo)
22	DF	Portugal	Miguel Barbosa (from (Portugal) Marítimo)
15	DF	Serbia	Marko Ristić (from Temnić)
5	MF	Ghana	Joseph Bempah (from (Mexico) Murciélagos)
25	MF	China	Yuhao Wang (from (China) Shanghai Jiading Boji)

Out: Note: Flags indicate national team as defined under FIFA eligibility rules; some limited exceptions apply. Players may hold more than one non-FIFA nationality.

No.	Pos.	Nation	Player
17	FW	Serbia	Đorđe Babić (loan return to Mladost Lučani)
22	FW	Russia	Bogdan Zhbanov (loan return to (Russia) Dynamo Saint Petersburg)
—	MF	Serbia	Stefan Jaraković (to LFK Mladost Lučani)
1	GK	Serbia	Dušan Čubraković (to (North Macedonia) Akademija Pandev)
15	MF	Serbia	Rade Glišović (to Zlatibor Čajetina)
—		Serbia	Branko Nikolić (to Sloga BB)
3	DF	Serbia	Nikola Vučković (to Timočanin)
20	FW	Serbia	Dejan Đorđević (to Sloga Požega)
44	MF	Serbia	Savo Jovanović (to Sloga Požega)
—		Serbia	Nemanja Erčević (to Crnokosa Kosjerić)
—	MF	Serbia	Marko Radojević (to Timočanin)
7	MF	Serbia	Nemanja Stošković (to Budućnost Popovac)
10	FW	Serbia	Miloš Živanović (released)
12	GK	Spain	Marko Cicović (to (Spain) Ibarra)
—	GK	Serbia	Luka Savić (to Red Star Belgrade)
16	MF	Serbia	Velibor Perućica (to OFK Beograd)
8	MF	Serbia	Filip Karadarević (to Sevojno)
7	MF	Serbia	Nemanja Knežević (to Jedinstvo Putevi, previously brought from the same club)
11	FW	England	Benjamin Agyeman-Badu (to (Slovenia) Ankaran)
26	DF	Serbia	Radomir Nešić (to GSP Polet Dorćol, previously brought from Sinđelić Beograd)
—	MF	Serbia	Veljko Antonijević (to Smederevo, previously brought from Dinamo Vranje)
27	FW	Serbia	Vladimir Stanimirović (to Jedinstvo Putevi)
5	MF	Serbia	Strahinja Bosanac (loan return to Zemun)
—		Serbia	Stefan Mitrašinović (to Jedinstvo Putevi)

=== Trayal ===
In: Note: Flags indicate national team as defined under FIFA eligibility rules; some limited exceptions apply. Players may hold more than one non-FIFA nationality.

No.	Pos.	Nation	Player
5	DF	Serbia	Nikola Radmanovac (was on loan, now signed from Napredak Kruševac)
8	MF	Serbia	Nemanja Milisavljević (from Napredak Kruševac)
31	DF	Serbia	Dušan Punoševac (from Trstenik PPT)
1	GK	Serbia	Stefan Stojanović (from Jagodina)
—		Serbia	Gradimir Trnavac (on loan from Napredak Kruševac, to youth team)
17	FW	Serbia	Ivica Jovanović (from (Montenegro) OFK Titograd)
13	MF	Serbia	Zlatko Liščević (from Radnički Pirot)
20		Serbia	Stefan Miljković (from (North Macedonia) Akademija Pandev)
—		Serbia	Jovan Kršanin (on loan from Napredak Kruševac, to youth team)
—	DF	Serbia	Marko Anđelković (on loan from Napredak Kruševac, to youth team)
—	GK	Serbia	Veljko Obradović (on loan from Napredak Kruševac, to youth team)
—		Serbia	Aleksa Petrović (on loan from Napredak Kruševac, to youth team)
—		Serbia	Stefan Tomić (on loan from Napredak Kruševac, to youth team)
—		Serbia	David Ivković (on loan from Napredak Kruševac, to youth team)
—		Serbia	Petar Grmuša (on loan from Napredak Kruševac, to youth team)
—		Serbia	Andrija Jevtić (on loan from Napredak Kruševac, to youth team)
—	FW	Serbia	Matija Nikolić (on loan from Napredak Kruševac, to youth team)
—		Serbia	Vojislav Marić (on loan from Napredak Kruševac, to youth team)
—		Serbia	Strahinja Živić (on loan from Napredak Kruševac, to youth team)
10	MF	Ghana	Baba Musah (on loan from Napredak Kruševac)
—	MF	Serbia	Miodrag Maljković (from Red Star Belgrade, to youth team)
77	MF	Serbia	Sreten Atanasković (from IMT)
9	FW	Cameroon	Michel Vaillant (on loan from Mladost Lučani)
45	FW	China	Zhang Wu (from Temnić)
—		Serbia	Krsto Damnjanović (on loan from Kiker, to youth team)
6	MF	Serbia	Nemanja Kruševac (from Budućnost Dobanovci)
14	MF	Ghana	Stephen Appiah (from Radnički Kragujevac)
7	MF	Serbia	Uroš Stepanović (from Novi Pazar)

Out: Note: Flags indicate national team as defined under FIFA eligibility rules; some limited exceptions apply. Players may hold more than one non-FIFA nationality.

No.	Pos.	Nation	Player
—	MF	Serbia	Nenad Šljivić (to Jedinstvo Mudrakovac, was on loan at Trstenik PPT)
—	DF	Serbia	Nikola Gašić (to Jedinstvo Mudrakovac)
—	MF	Serbia	Christian Vujčić (on loan to SFS Borac Paraćin)
—	MF	Serbia	Nemanja Radmanović (on loan to SFS Borac Paraćin)
—	GK	Serbia	Nemanja Ratajac (to Bukovik Ražanj)
—	MF	Serbia	Đorđe Bićanin (to Omladinac Novi Banovci)
45	FW	Serbia	Marko Rajković (to Sloboda Užice, previously brought from Metalac G. M.)
—		Serbia	Dušan Jovanović (to Bukovik Ražanj)
—	FW	Serbia	Dejan Mašić (to Rtanj Boljevac)
—		Serbia	Jovan Milošević (on loan to Trstenik PPT)
—		Serbia	Ilija Egerić (to Poljoprivrednik)
—		Serbia	Andrija Ržaničanin (to Bukovik Ražanj)
—		Serbia	Dimitrije Tomić (to Bukovik Ražanj)
—		Serbia	Nikola Dubroja (to Bukovik Ražanj)
10	MF	Serbia	Stefan Milojević (to Žarkovo)
7	MF	Serbia	Milan Nikolić (retired)
—		Serbia	Marko Dobrodolac (to Bukovik Ražanj)
9	FW	Serbia	Dragan Milovanović (to Temnić)
—	MF	Serbia	Predrag Veličković (to IMT)
14	MF	Serbia	Marko Ristić (on loan to Jedinstvo Mudrakovac)
22	GK	Serbia	Nenad Jovanović (to Trepča)

=== Žarkovo ===
In: Note: Flags indicate national team as defined under FIFA eligibility rules; some limited exceptions apply. Players may hold more than one non-FIFA nationality.

No.	Pos.	Nation	Player
11	MF	Ukraine	Yevhen Kovalenko (from (Ukraine) Kremin Kremenchuk)
4	MF	Serbia	Marko Nikolić (free, last with (Montenegro) Grbalj)
18	FW	Serbia	Nikola Vujović (from Lokomotiva Železnik)
24	FW	Serbia	Stefan Trivković (from Šumadija Aranđelovac)
50	FW	Serbia	Nenad Đurđević (from Radnički Kragujevac)
12	GK	Bosnia and Herzegovina	Slaviša Bogdanović (from Smederevo)
6	DF	Serbia	Dušan Todorović (from Kolubara)
15	DF	Serbia	Aleksandar Milanović (from BASK)
19	FW	Serbia	Krsta Đorđević (from Radnik Surdulica)
—		Serbia	Marko Đurić (from Red Star Belgrade, to youth team)
32	DF	Serbia	Adnan Islamović (on loan from Partizan)
77	MF	Serbia	Stefan Milojević (from Trayal)
14	DF	Liberia	Omega Roberts (free, last with (Azerbaijan) AZAL)

Out: Note: Flags indicate national team as defined under FIFA eligibility rules; some limited exceptions apply. Players may hold more than one non-FIFA nationality.

No.	Pos.	Nation	Player
—	FW	Serbia	Veljko Trifunović (loan return to Rad)
—	DF	Serbia	Vuk Kovačević (to Dunav Stari Banovci)
—	FW	Serbia	Momčilo Krstić (to Zvezdara)
—	MF	Serbia	Srđan Ivanović (to Jedinstvo Surčin)
—	DF	Bosnia and Herzegovina	Igor Ateljević (to Prva Iskra)
—	FW	Serbia	Nikola Čapljić (to Sopot)
—	DF	Serbia	Dimitrije Pavić (to Mladi Borac V. O.)
—	FW	Serbia	Dean Tišma (to Sloboda Užice)
—	DF	Serbia	Saša Domić (to (Slovenia) Brežice)

=== Bečej ===
In: Note: Flags indicate national team as defined under FIFA eligibility rules; some limited exceptions apply. Players may hold more than one non-FIFA nationality.

No.	Pos.	Nation	Player
8	MF	Serbia	Slavoljub Dabižljević (from Mladost Bački Jarak)
3	DF	Serbia	Vukašin Jelić (from ČSK Čelarevo)
12	GK	Serbia	Nemanja Radović (from Radnički Zrenjanin)
14	MF	Serbia	Stefan Cvijić (from Sloga Erdevik)
10	FW	Serbia	Nemanja Grujić (from TSC)
2	DF	Serbia	Sava Radić (on loan from Čukarički)
18	FW	Serbia	David Knežević (from Crvena Zvezda NS)
17	DF	Serbia	Marko Mandić (on loan from Vojvodina)
11	MF	Serbia	Nemanja Lazić (from Inđija)
16	DF	Serbia	Stefan Sekulić (from Cement)
15	DF	Serbia	Igor Tatić (from Borac Sakule)
25	FW	Serbia	Ilija Erdeljan (from GSP Polet Dorćol)
23	MF	Serbia	Aleksandar Erak (on loan from TSC)

Out: Note: Flags indicate national team as defined under FIFA eligibility rules; some limited exceptions apply. Players may hold more than one non-FIFA nationality.

No.	Pos.	Nation	Player
—	FW	Serbia	Kosta Aleksić (to Čukarički)
—	MF	Serbia	Aleksandar Mirkov (to Vojvodina)
—	FW	Serbia	Goran Potkozarac (to Zlatibor Čajetina)
—	DF	Serbia	Alen Janković (to Bratstvo Prigrevica)
—	GK	Serbia	Isidor Milovanov (on loan to Vojvodina Bačko Gradište)
—		Serbia	Bojan Cifrić (to Bačka Mol)
—	FW	Bosnia and Herzegovina	Aleksandar Babić (to Jedinstvo Novi Bečej)
—		Serbia	Lazar Vranješ (on loan to Jedinstvo Novi Bečej)
—	MF	Serbia	Davor Jelić (on loan to Borac Novi Sad)
—	MF	Serbia	Jovan Ćuk (to Borac Novi Sad)
—		Serbia	Dragan Latinović (to Mladost Turija)
—	FW	Serbia	Bratislav Jelić (on loan to Mladost Turija)
—		Serbia	Nikola Savin (on loan to Mladost Turija)
—		Serbia	Aleksandar Ćuk (to Napredak Nadalj)
—		Serbia	Đorđe Kozarski (to Napredak Nadalj)
—	DF	Serbia	Filip Ungar (to Hajduk Kula)
—	FW	Serbia	Stefan Dražić (to Napredak Nadalj, was on loan at Vojvodina Bačko Gradište)
21	MF	Serbia	David Dujić (on loan to Radnički Nova Pazova, previously brought from Budućnost Dobanovci)

=== Zlatibor Čajetina ===
In: Note: Flags indicate national team as defined under FIFA eligibility rules; some limited exceptions apply. Players may hold more than one non-FIFA nationality.

No.	Pos.	Nation	Player
29	DF	Serbia	Đorđe Mihailović (from Šumadija Aranđelovac)
21	DF	Serbia	Stefan Todorović (from Tutin)
19	FW	Serbia	Goran Potkozarac (from Bečej)
30	DF	Serbia	Aleksandar Dragačević (from Radnički Kragujevac)
4	MF	Serbia	Marko Živanović (from Smederevo)
15	MF	Serbia	Rade Glišović (from Sloboda Užice)
28		Serbia	Andrija Zakoč (from Voždovac)
20	FW	Serbia	Vladimir Petrović (from Metalac G. M.)
14	MF	Serbia	Stefan Grbović (from (Slovenia) Brda)
27	FW	Montenegro	Nikola Vućić (from Cement)
1	GK	Serbia	Miloš Čupić (on loan from Red Star Belgrade)
33	DF	Serbia	Aleksandar Tasić (from Dinamo Vranje)

Out: Note: Flags indicate national team as defined under FIFA eligibility rules; some limited exceptions apply. Players may hold more than one non-FIFA nationality.

No.	Pos.	Nation	Player
—	MF	Serbia	Aleksandar Mitrović (loan return to Sloboda Užice)
—	DF	Serbia	Milan Srbijanac (loan return to Inđija)
—	FW	Serbia	Luka Ristivojević (loan return to Čukarički)
—	DF	Serbia	Branko Milosavljević (to Sloga BB)
—	MF	Serbia	Nikola Lazović (to Sloboda Užice)
—	FW	Serbia	Ranko Ječmenica (to Timočanin)
—	FW	Serbia	Stefan Đurić (to Jagodina Tabane)
—	MF	Serbia	Nikola Mladenović (to Kolubara)
—	MF	Serbia	Marko Stanić (to Mladost Lučani)
—	FW	Serbia	Slobodan Nikačević (to FAP)
—	MF	Serbia	Petar Veličković (to Radnički 1912)
—		Serbia	Nikola Stanić (to Sloga BB, was on loan at Jedinstvo Putevi)
—	GK	Serbia	Darko Vukašinović (to Loznica)
—	FW	Serbia	Jovan Kastratović (to Sloga Kraljevo)
—	FW	Serbia	Borko Veselinović (to Rad)
18	MF	Serbia	Dušan Đuričić (to Podunavac Belegiš, previously brought from IMT)

== See also ==
- Serbian SuperLiga
- 2018–19 Serbian SuperLiga
- Serbian First League
- 2018–19 Serbian First League
