= 2024–25 FK Napredak Kruševac season =

FK Napredak Kruševac
2024–25 season
- Stadium: Mladost Stadium
- Serbian SuperLiga: Pre-season
- Serbian Cup: Pre-season

The 2024–25 season is the 78th year in the history of FK Napredak Kruševac, and the club's ninth consecutive season in Serbian SuperLiga. In addition to the domestic league, the team is scheduled to participate in the Serbian Cup.

== Squad ==
As of 20 June 2024

Note: Flags indicate national team as defined under FIFA eligibility rules; some limited exceptions apply. Players may hold more than one non-FIFA nationality.

No.	Pos.	Nation	Player
1	GK	SRB	Vladimir Savić
4	MF	SRB	Filip Krstić
5	DF	SRB	Nikola Stevanović
7	DF	SRB	Nikola Vukajlović
8	MF	SRB	Filip Jović
10	MF	SRB	Branislav Tomić
11	MF	SRB	Luka Laban
12	FW	SRB	Nebojša Bastajić
16	MF	SRB	Andrej Blagojević
17	DF	SRB	Lazar Miladinović
18	MF	SRB	Mateja Gajić
19	GK	SRB	Vladimir Bajić
20	DF	SRB	Nikola Marinković
22	MF	SRB	Veljko Milenković
23	MF	SRB	Lazar Zličić

No.	Pos.	Nation	Player
24	FW	SRB	Đorđe Skočajić
25	DF	SRB	Nemanja Đeković
31	MF	SRB	Saša Marjanović
33	FW	SRB	Dušan Stoiljković
44	MF	BIH	Damir Sadiković
45	DF	SRB	Jovan Marinković
70	MF	SRB	Marko Putinčanin
77	FW	SRB	Uroš Nenadović
82	GK	SRB	Veljko Pajović
84	GK	SRB	Lazar Balević
88	FW	SRB	Đorđe Jovanović
95	MF	SRB	Nikola Stanković
99	DF	SRB	Pavle Mihajlović

== Friendlies ==
=== Pre-season ===
3 July 2024 Friendly	Nyíregyháza (Hungary)	1–3	(Serbia) Napredak Kruševac
17:00 UTC+2

7 July 2024 Friendly	Napredak Kruševac (Serbia)	1–1	(Czech Republic) Bohemians 1905	Ptuj, Slovenia
17:30 UTC+2	Obradović 3'		Dostál 8'	Stadium: Mestni Štadion

14 July 2024 Friendly	Napredak Kruševac (Serbia)	0–0	(Serbia) Radnik Surdulica
19:00 UTC+2

== Competitions ==
=== Overall record ===
Competition	First match	Last match	Starting round	Record							
Competition	First match	Last match	Starting round	Pld	W	D	L	GF	GA	GD	Win %
Serbian SuperLiga	19 July 2024		Matchday 1	1	0	0	1	0	1	−1	0.00
Serbian Cup				0	0	0	0	0	0	+0	—
Total				1	0	0	1	0	1	−1	0.00

Last updated: 19 July 2024
Source: Soccerway

=== Serbian SuperLiga ===
==== Results summary ====
Overall								Home						Away					
Pld	W	D	L	GF	GA	GD	Pts	W	D	L	GF	GA	GD	W	D	L	GF	GA	GD
1	0	0	1	0	1	−1	0	0	0	1	0	1	−1	0	0	0	0	0	0

Last updated: 19 July 2024.

==== Results by round ====
Round	1
Ground	H
Result	L
Position	

Updated to match(es) played on 19 July 2024. Source:
A = Away; H = Home; W = Win; D = Draw; L = Loss

==== Matches ====
The match schedule was released on 10 June 2024.

19 July 2024 1	Napredak Kruševac	0–1	Partizan	Kruševac
21:00 UTC+2	Tošeski (red card) 67'		Saldanha 90+3'	Stadium: Mladost Stadium; Referee: Novak Simović
