= Igor Savić =

Igor Savić may refer to:

- Igor Savić (footballer, born 1997), Serbian football forward for Borac Čačak
- Igor Savić (footballer, born 2000), Bosnian football midfielder for Zrinjski Mostar
- Igor Savić (football manager) (fl. 2017–2022), Serbian football manager
