= Stefan Milojević =

Stefan Milojević may refer to:

- Stefan Milojević (footballer, born January 1989), Serbian football attacking midfielder for Teleoptik, Voždovac, Banat Zrenjanin, Borac Čačak, Bežanija, Novi Pazar, Kokkolan, Kolubara, and Trayal Kruševac
- Stefan Milojević (footballer, born February 1989), Serbian football midfielder for Chênois, Menton, Corte, Geyland International and Woodlands Wellington
- Stefan Milojević (footballer, born 1991), Serbian-French football defender for Teleoptik, Košice, Borča, Bežanija, Airdrieonians, Greenock Morton, and ViOn Zlaté Moravce
