= Ivan Živanović =

Ivan Živanović may refer to:

- Ivan Živanović (footballer, born 1981), Serbian association football player
- Ivan Živanović (footballer, born 1995), Serbian association football player who plays for FK Radnički 1923
