= Filip Jović =

Filip Jović may refer to:

- Filip Jović (footballer, born 1997), Serbian football player
- Filip Jović (footballer, born 2000), Serbian football player
- Filip Jović (basketball) (born 2005), Serbian basketball player
