= Strahinja Karišić =

Serbian footballer

Personal information
- Date of birth: 3 July 1997 (age 29)
- Place of birth: Pristina, Kosovo, FR Yugoslavia
- Height: 1.80 m (5 ft 11 in)
- Position: Midfielder

Youth career
- Rad
- 2015–2016: Granada
- 2017–2018: Watford U23
- 2017–2018: → Fluminense (loan)

Senior career*
Years	Team	Apps	(Gls)
2016–2017	Recreativo Granada	1	(0)
2018	Rad	3	(0)
2018–2019	Partizan	0	(0)
2018–2019	→ Teleoptik (loan)	20	(1)
2019	Voždovac	1	(0)
2020	Sinđelić	7	(1)
2020	Primorje	7	(0)
2021	Žarkovo	17	(3)
2021–2022	Bačka Palanka	30	(4)
2022	RFK Novi Sad	16	(1)
2023	Rad	2	(0)
2024–	Radnički Zrenjanin	0	(0)
- * Club domestic league appearances and goals as of 6 October 2021

Strahinja Karišić (Serbian: Страхиња Каришић; born 3 July 1997) is a Serbian professional footballer who plays as a midfielder for Serbian League Vojvodina side Radnički Zrenjanin.

== Career ==
In 2015, Karišić joined the youth academy of Spanish La Liga side Granada.

He was included on the extended roster of Watford for the 2017–18 Premier League as an under-21 player, but did not make any appearances or call-ups to the senior squad.

In 2017, he joined the youth academy of Fluminense in Brazil on loan, but left that December.

In mid-2018, his rights were acquired by Partizan. For the 2018–19 season, Karišić was loaned to Serbian second division club Teleoptik, where he made 20 league appearances and scored 1 goal.

In 2019, he signed for Voždovac in the Serbian top flight.

In 2020, Karišić signed for Slovenian second division team Primorje.
