= Jamie Zerafa =

Maltese footballer (born 1998)

Personal information
- Full name: Jamie Zerafa
- Date of birth: 2 March 1998 (age 28)
- Place of birth: Malta
- Position: Midfielder

Team information
- Current team: St. Lucia
- Number: 22

Senior career*
Years	Team	Apps	(Gls)
2015–2020	Balzan	11	(0)
2018	→ Inđija (loan)	4	(0)
2019–2020	→ St. Lucia (loan)	18	(1)
2020-2023	→ St. Lucia	55	(2)

International career^{‡}
2016	Malta U19	2	(0)
2017–2020	Malta U21	7	(0)
- * Club domestic league appearances and goals as of 25 June 2023 ‡ National team caps and goals as of 28 March 2021

Jamie Zerafa (born 2 March 1998) is a Maltese footballer.

== Club career ==
Zerafa played in the Maltese Premier League with Balzan F.C. between 2015 and 2018. With Balzans, Zerafa was twice Premier League runner-up, in 2016–17 and 2017–18, 2015–16 Maltese FA Trophy finalist, and 2015 winner of Summer Cup.

In May 2018, Zerafa along his Balzan teammate Antonio Mitrev, went on trials to Serbian club FK Inđija. Zerafa passed the trials and signed with Inđija. Zerafa debuted with Inđija in the 2018–19 Serbian First League on September 9, 2018, in a home victory by 4–0 against TSC Bačka Topola. At the end of the season Inđija finished second and achieved promotion to the Serbian SuperLiga, however, in a tough competition to earn playing time, Zerafa managed to make 4 appearances, all as a substitute. At the end of the season he returned to Malta and moved on loan to Maltese newly promoted top-league side St. Lucia F.C.

== International career ==
From 2016, Zerafa was a member of Maltese under-19 national team.

== Honours ==
Balzan

- Maltese Summer Cup: 2015
