= Nenad Đurđević =

Serbian footballer

Personal information
- Date of birth: 14 July 1987 (age 39)
- Place of birth: Kragujevac, SFR Yugoslavia
- Height: 1.80 m (5 ft 11 in)
- Position: Forward

Team information
- Current team: Napredak Markovac

Senior career*
Years	Team	Apps	(Gls)
2005–2006	Šumadija 1903	14	(0)
2006–2007	Pobeda Beloševac		
2008	VGSK Veliko Gradište		
2009	INON Požarevac	13	(1)
2009–2010	Sloga Batočina		
2010–2012	Partizan Bumbarevo Brdo	35	(12)
2011	→ Radnički Kragujevac (loan)	4	(0)
2012–2013	BSK Borča	4	(0)
2013	→ Radnik Surdulica (loan)	12	(8)
2013–2014	Radnik Surdulica	28	(5)
2014	Kolubara	6	(0)
2015	Dinamo Vranje	12	(15)
2015	Loznica	13	(1)
2016–2017	Šumadija 1903	38	(31)
2017–2018	Radnički Kragujevac	26	(8)
2018–2019	Žarkovo	7	(0)
2019	Smederevo		
2019–2022	Sušica		
2022–2023	Morava Ćuprija		
2023-	OFK Napredak Markovac		
- * Club domestic league appearances and goals as of 13 October 2018

Nenad Đurđević (Serbian Cyrillic: Ненад Ђурђевић; also transliterated Djurdjević; born 14 July 1987) is a Serbian footballer who plays as a forward for Napredak Markovac. Through the career, he changed many clubs in Serbia.
