= Miloš Milisavljević =

Serbian footballer

Personal information
- Date of birth: 26 October 1992 (age 34)
- Place of birth: Valjevo, FR Yugoslavia
- Height: 1.83 m (6 ft 0 in)
- Position: Midfielder

Team information
- Current team: Smederevo
- Number: 10

Senior career*
Years	Team	Apps	(Gls)
2008–2011	Budućnost Valjevo	33	(1)
2012–2013	Mačva Šabac	31	(2)
2013	Železničar Lajkovac	13	(2)
2014	Kolubara	9	(0)
2014–2015	Rad	30	(1)
2016	Mladost Doboj Kakanj	6	(0)
2016	Javor Ivanjica	15	(1)
2017	Železničar Lajkovac		
2018	Inđija	15	(2)
2018–2019	TSC Bačka Topola	30	(3)
2019–2020	Kolubara	20	(6)
2020–2021	Metalac Gornji Milanovac	9	(1)
2021	→ Kolubara (loan)	7	(1)
2021	Kolubara	6	(0)
2022	Radnički Kragujevac	18	(0)
2022–2023	Makedonikos	17	(1)
2023-2024	Kolubara	14	(1)
2024-	Smederevo	28	(1)
- * Club domestic league appearances and goals as of 1 July 2025

Miloš Milisavljević (Serbian Cyrillic: Милош Милисављевић; born 26 October 1992) is a Serbian professional footballer who plays as a midfielder for Smederevo.
