= Đorđe Bašanović =

Serbian footballer

Personal information
- Date of birth: 31 July 1996 (age 30)
- Place of birth: Belgrade, FR Yugoslavia
- Height: 1.84 m (6 ft 0 in)
- Position: Left-back

Team information
- Current team: Sloven Ruma

Youth career
- Rad

Senior career*
Years	Team	Apps	(Gls)
2014	Brodarac		
2015–2018	Čukarički	6	(0)
2018–2019	Zemun	6	(0)
2019–2020	Rad	15	(0)
2021	Proleter Novi Sad	31	(1)
2023	Ušće		
2023-2024	Brodarac		
2024-2025	Radnički Sremska Mitrovica	35	(0)
2025-	Sloven Ruma		

International career
2014	Serbia U19	5	(0)
- * Club domestic league appearances and goals as of 2 October 2022

Đorđe Bašanović (Serbian Cyrillic: Ђорђе Башановић; born 31 July 1996) is a Serbian professional footballer who plays as a defender for Sloven Ruma.

== Honours ==
Čukarički

- Serbian Cup: 2014–15
