= Damjan Gojkov =

Serbian footballer

Personal information
- Date of birth: 2 January 1998 (age 28)
- Place of birth: Vrbas, FR Yugoslavia
- Height: 1.67 m (5 ft 6 in)
- Position: Winger

Team information
- Current team: Bor

Youth career
- OFK Beograd

Senior career*
| Years | Team | Apps | (Gls) |
| 2015–2017 | OFK Beograd | 37 | (1) |
| 2017–2018 | Red Star Belgrade | 0 | (0) |
| 2017–2018 | → Bežanija (loan) | 25 | (4) |
| 2018–2019 | Vojvodina | 29 | (1) |
| 2019–2020 | Spartak Subotica | 15 | (1) |
| 2020 | → Kolubara (loan) | 7 | (0) |
| 2021 | Žarkovo | 28 | (6) |
| 2022 | Spartak Subotica | 13 | (0) |
| 2022-2023 | Linense | 4 | (0) |
| 2023 | → Torremolinos (loan) | 5 | (1) |
| 2024 | Radnik Bijeljina | 2 | (0) |
| 2024 | San Pedro | | |
| 2024-2025 | OFK Vrbas | 13 | (3) |
| 2025 | Železničar Inđija | 13 | (0) |
| 2026- | Bor | 0 | (0) |

International career
| 2013–2014 | Serbia U16 | 3 | (1) |
| 2015–2016 | Serbia U18 | 8 | (0) |
| 2016–2017 | Serbia U19 | 11 | (1) |
- * Club domestic league appearances and goals as of 11:33, 22 January 2026 (UTC)

Damjan Gojkov (Serbian Cyrillic: Дамјан Гојков; born 2 January 1998) is a Serbian footballer, who plays as a midfielder for Bor.

After spells in the Spanish lower leagues with Linense and Torremolinos, Gojkov joined Bosnian side Radnik Bijeljina in January 2024. In June 2024 however, he returned to Spain and signed for UD San Pedro.

== Career statistics ==
As of 27 July 2019

| Club | Season | League | | | Cup | | Continental | | Other | | Total | |
| Club | Season | Division | Apps | Goals | Apps | Goals | Apps | Goals | Apps | Goals | Apps | Goals |
|---|---|---|---|---|---|---|---|---|---|---|---|---|
| OFK Beograd | 2014–15 | Serbian SuperLiga | 1 | 0 | — | | — | | — | | 1 | 0 |
| OFK Beograd | 2015–16 | Serbian SuperLiga | 15 | 0 | 2 | 0 | — | | — | | 17 | 0 |
| OFK Beograd | 2016–17 | Serbian First League | 21 | 1 | 1 | 0 | — | | — | | 22 | 1 |
| OFK Beograd | Total | | 37 | 1 | 3 | 0 | — | | — | | 40 | 1 |
| Bežanija (loan) | 2017–18 | Serbian First League | 25 | 4 | — | | — | | — | | 25 | 4 |
| Vojvodina | 2018–19 | Serbian SuperLiga | 29 | 1 | 3 | 1 | — | | — | | 32 | 2 |
| Spartak Subotica | 2019–20 | Serbian SuperLiga | 0 | 0 | 0 | 0 | — | | — | | 0 | 0 |
| Career total | | | 91 | 6 | 6 | 1 | 0 | 0 | — | | 97 | 7 |
