= Lazar Đokić =

Montenegrin footballer

Personal information
- Full name: Lazar Đokić
- Date of birth: 16 May 1996 (age 30)
- Place of birth: Podgorica, FR Yugoslavia
- Height: 1.75 m (5 ft 9 in)
- Positions: Midfielder; winger

Team information
- Current team: NK Pajde Möhlin
- Number: 14

Senior career*
Years	Team	Apps	(Gls)
2014	Mladost Podgorica	3	(0)
2015	Donji Srem	0	(0)
2015	Zemun	1	(0)
2016	Radnički Beograd	6	(0)
2016	Spartak Subotica	3	(0)
2017	Dinamo Vranje	14	(4)
2017	Čukarički	1	(0)
2018	Metalac GM	11	(1)
2018	Dinamo Vranje	6	(1)
2019–	NK Pajde Möhlin	12	(4)
- * Club domestic league appearances and goals as of 5 February 2019

Lazar Đokić (Cyrillic: Лазар Ђокић, born 16 May 1996) is a Montenegrin football attacker who plays for Swiss club NK Pajde Möhlin.

== Club career ==
Born in Podgorica, he started playing with FK Mladost Podgorica in the 2014–15 Montenegrin First League. Then he moved to Serbia, where he played in several leveçs with several clubs. He played with FK Donji Srem, FK Zemun, FK Radnički Beograd, FK Spartak Subotica, FK Dinamo Vranje and FK Čukarički.

Ahead of the 2019–20 season, Đokić joined Swiss club NK Pajde Möhlin.
