= Taigo =

Brazilian footballer

Personal information
- Full name: Taigo Vital Amorim de Araujo
- Date of birth: 28 May 1997 (age 29)
- Place of birth: Telêmaco Borba, Brazil
- Height: 1.75 m (5 ft 9 in)
- Position: Right-back

Team information
- Current team: Operário

Youth career
- 2010–2015: Coritiba

Senior career*
Years	Team	Apps	(Gls)
2015–2018	Coritiba	0	(0)
2015–2018	→ Coritiba B		
2018	Dinamo Vranje	4	(0)
2019	São Paulo–RS	6	(0)
2019	Guarany de Sobral	3	(0)
2020–	Operário Lagoa	0	(0)
- * Club domestic league appearances and goals as of 1 January 2020

Taigo Vital Amorim de Araujo, commonly known as Taigo (born 28 May 1997) is a Brazilian footballer who plays as a right-back for Portuguese side CD Operário in the Liga Meo Azores.

== Career ==
Taigo was born in Telêmaco Borba, in state of Paraná, Brazil. As a youngster, Taigo participated in motocross championships in state of Parana in Brazil.

Taigo started his football career at Coritiba U-13. Afterwards, he went through Silvio Pereira school, Colégio Positivo with Anderson Valério, and CER Aquárius with Edilson Pukanski. By 2015 he had seven Paraná youth state championships, two titles of Gradisca Tournament in Italy, and a Brazilian championship in under-15 level.

He begin playing for Coritiba B team since 2013 and regularly since 2015

In summer 2018 he moved to Europe and signed with Serbian newly-promoted top-league side FK Dinamo Vranje. He made his debut in the 2018–19 Serbian SuperLiga on 26 August 2018, in a home game against FK Zemun, a 1–0 victory.

During the winter season-break, he returned to Brazil and played in 2019 first with Sport Club São Paulo and then with Guarany Sporting Club, better known as Guarany from Sobral.

In the 2020–21 season he made a new attempt in Europe, this time by signing with Portuguese side CD Operário, located in the Azores Islands.
