= Milan Srbijanac =

Serbian footballer

Personal information
- Date of birth: 14 October 1998 (age 28)
- Place of birth: Novi Sad, FR Yugoslavia
- Height: 1.72 m (5 ft 8 in)
- Position: Wing-back

Team information
- Current team: Bor
- Number: 22

Youth career
- Inđija

Senior career*
Years	Team	Apps	(Gls)
2015–2018	Inđija	35	(1)
2018	→ Zlatibor Čajetina (loan)	0	(0)
2018–2019	Bratstvo	0	(0)
2019–2021	Kabel	32	(2)
2021–2023	Inđija	54	(4)
2023	Radnički Sremska Mitrovica	14	(0)
2024	Sloboda Užice	16	(3)
2024-2025	Grafičar	23	(1)
2025	Železničar Inđija	9	(3)
2026	Pelister	18	(2)
2026-	Bor	8	(0)

International career
2015	Serbia U18		
- * Club domestic league appearances and goals as of 23 September 2026

Milan Srbijanac (Serbian Cyrillic: Милан Србијанац; born 14 October 1998) is a Serbian professional footballer who plays for Bor.

== Club career ==
=== Inđija ===
Born in Novi Sad, Milan is a product of FK Inđija youth sistem. He joined the first team in 2015 and made his first official appearance for the club in 4–0 victory against ČSK Čelarevo on 24 October 2015, in 11 fixture of the 2015–16 Serbian First League season. For the first season he performed as a senior, Srbijanac collected 16 league matches, 10 in the first squad and 6 as a back-up player. He also played in a cup matches against Rad and Vojvodina. In summer 2016, Srbijanac signed a two-year scholarship contract with club. Srbijanac also started the 2016–17 Serbian First League season with the first team, but due to eligibility for playing with youth, he was mostly used as a back-up player. He scored his first senior goal on 11 March 2017, in 2–1 away victory against Sloboda Užice.

== International career ==
In September 2016, as a coach of Serbia U18 national level, Ivan Tomić invited Srbijanac into the squad for friendly matches against Hungary. He also played in a 0-4 defeat against the Netherlands on 8 October 2015.

== Career statistics ==
=== Club ===
As of 17 June 2017

Club	Season	League			Cup		Continental		Other		Total	
Club	Season	Division	Apps	Goals	Apps	Goals	Apps	Goals	Apps	Goals	Apps	Goals
Inđija	2015–16	First League	16	0	2	0	—		—		18	0
Inđija	2016–17	First League	10	1	0	0	—		—		10	1
Inđija	Total		26	1	2	0	—		—		28	1
