= Pavle Propadalo =

Serbian footballer

Personal information
- Full name: Pavle Propadalo
- Date of birth: 24 November 1994 (age 31)
- Place of birth: Čačak, FR Yugoslavia
- Height: 1.87 m (6 ft 2 in)
- Position: Central midfielder

Youth career
- Borac Čačak

Senior career*
Years	Team	Apps	(Gls)
2013–2014	Košice	0	(0)
2014	Bežanija	0	(0)
2014–2015	OFK Beograd	0	(0)
2015	Metalac Gornji Milanovac	5	(0)
2016–2018	Borac Čačak	15	(0)
2018	Radnik Surdulica	0	(0)
2018–2019	Dinamo Vranje	2	(0)
- * Club domestic league appearances and goals as of 11 April 2019

Pavle Propadalo (Serbian Cyrillic: Павле Пропадало; born 24 November 1994) is a Serbian football midfielder who is currently a free agent.

== Career ==
Born in Čačak, Propadalo passed Borac Čačak youth school. He had signed with a three-year contract with Košice in summer 2013, but he moved in Bežanija next year. Later, same year, he spent some period with OFK Beograd. Pavle joined Metalac Gornji Milanovac beginning of 2015, where he stayed until the end of 2014–15 season. He returned in Borac Čačak in summer 2015.
