= Tan Jiajie =

Chinese footballer

Personal information
- Date of birth: 12 January 1997 (age 29)
- Place of birth: Zhaoqing, Guangdong, China
- Position: Midfielder

Team information
- Current team: Sinđelić Beograd
- Number: 15

Senior career*
Years	Team	Apps	(Gls)
2018–2019	Sinđelić Beograd	8	(0)
- * Club domestic league appearances and goals as of 18:54, 31 December 2019 (UTC)

Tan Jiajie (simplified Chinese: 谭家杰; traditional Chinese: 譚家傑; pinyin: Tán Jiājié; born 12 January 1997) is a Chinese footballer.

== Career statistics ==
=== Club ===
As of 31 December 2019.

Club	Season	League			Cup		Continental		Other		Total	
Club	Season	Division	Apps	Goals	Apps	Goals	Apps	Goals	Apps	Goals	Apps	Goals
Sinđelić Beograd	2018–19	Serbian First League	8	0	1 (Note: Appearances in the Serbian Cup)	0	–		0	0	9	0
Career total			8	0	1	0	0	0	0	0	9	0
