= Nikola Jovanović (footballer, born 1992) =

Serbian footballer

Personal information
- Date of birth: 12 June 1992 (age 34)
- Place of birth: Priština, FR Yugoslavia
- Height: 1.82 m (6 ft 0 in)
- Position: Left-back

Team information
- Current team: Sloga Kraljevo

Senior career*
Years	Team	Apps	(Gls)
2011–2015	Javor Ivanjica	0	(0)
2011–2014	→ Rudar Kostolac (loan)	63	(9)
2015	→ Železničar Lajkovac (loan)	13	(0)
2015	Inđija	10	(0)
2016	Loznica	10	(0)
2016–2017	Dinamo Vranje	27	(0)
2017–2018	OFK Bačka	0	(0)
2018–2021	Dinamo Vranje	44	(1)
2021	Mladost Novi Sad		
2021	Radnički Sombor		
2022	Sloga Kraljevo		
2022	OFK Beograd		
2023-	Sloga Kraljevo		
- * Club domestic league appearances and goals as of 22 November 2020

Nikola Jovanović (Serbian Cyrillic: Никола Јовановић; born 12 June 1992) is a Serbian football defender.

== Club career ==
Born in Priština, Jovanović started his career with Javor Ivanjica in the 2010–11 season. Later, he spent mostly time with Rudar Kostolac and Železničar Lajkovac in the Serbian League West, where he appeared as a loaned player until the end of 2014–15 season. In summer 2015, Jovanović joined the Serbian First League side Inđija, but after a half-season he moved to Loznica. Next the club relegated from the competition, Jovanović signed with Dinamo Vranje in summer as a single player. After a season with Dinamo, Jovanović made a deal with the Serbian SuperLiga club OFK Bačka in 2017.

== Career statistics ==
As of 20 June 2017

Club	Season	League			Cup		Continental		Other		Total	
Club	Season	Division	Apps	Goals	Apps	Goals	Apps	Goals	Apps	Goals	Apps	Goals
Rudar Kostolac (loan)	2011–12	Serbian League West	23	5	—		—		—		23	5
Rudar Kostolac (loan)	2013–14	Serbian League West	25	2	—		—		—		25	2
Rudar Kostolac (loan)	2014–15	Serbian League West	15	2	—		—		—		15	2
Rudar Kostolac (loan)	Total		63	9	—		—		—		63	9
Železničar Lajkovac (loan)	2014–15	Serbian League West	13	0	—		—		—		13	0
Inđija	2015–16	Serbian First League	10	0	—		—		—		10	0
Loznica	2015–16	Serbian First League	10	0	—		—		—		10	0
Dinamo Vranje	2016–17	Serbian First League	27	0	1	0	—		—		28	0
OFK Bačka	2017–18	Serbian SuperLiga	0	0	0	0	—		—		0	0
Career total			123	9	1	0	—		—		124	9
