= Bogdan Zhbanov =

Russian footballer

Personal information
- Full name: Bogdan Dmitriyevich Zhbanov
- Date of birth: 28 April 1998 (age 28)
- Place of birth: Saint Petersburg, Russia
- Height: 1.79 m (5 ft 10 in)
- Positions: Midfielder; forward

Senior career*
Years	Team	Apps	(Gls)
2016–2018	FC Dynamo Saint Petersburg	5	(1)
2017	→ FC Dynamo-2 Saint Petersburg	9	(0)
2018	→ FK Sloboda Užice (loan)	1	(0)
2018–2019	FC Zvezda Saint Petersburg (amateur)		
2019–2020	FC Yadro Saint Petersburg (amateur)		
2021	FC Dynamo Saint Petersburg	1	(0)
- * Club domestic league appearances and goals

Bogdan Dmitriyevich Zhbanov (Russian: Богдан Дмитриевич Жбанов; born 28 April 1998) is a Russian former football forward.

== Club career ==
Born in Saint Petersburg, he made his debut in the Russian Professional Football League for FC Dynamo Saint Petersburg on 10 April 2016 in a game against FC Dnepr Smolensk.

In the winter-break of 2017–18 season, he joined on loan Serbian club FK Sloboda Užice.
