= Savo Jovanović =

Serbian footballer

Personal information
- Date of birth: 11 November 1999 (age 27)
- Place of birth: Užice, FR Yugoslavia
- Height: 1.80 m (5 ft 11 in)
- Position: Defensive midfielder

Team information
- Current team: Lazarica Prilipac

Youth career
- Sloboda Užice

Senior career*
Years	Team	Apps	(Gls)
2017–2018	Sloboda Užice	12	(0)
2019	Drina Ljubovija		
2019–2023	Sevojno		
2023–	Lazarica Prilipac		
- * Club domestic league appearances and goals as of 18 December 2017

Savo Jovanović (Serbian Cyrillic: Саво Јовановић; born 11 November 1999) is a Serbian footballer, who plays for Lazarica Prilipac. He played in the Serbian second tier with Sloboda Užice.

== Club career ==
=== Sloboda Užice ===
As a product of Sloboda Užice youth academy, Jovanović has joined the first team in 2017. After he spent the 18 fixture match against Zemun as an unused substitution, Jovanović made his senior debut for the team in the last round of the 2016–17 Serbian First League season, replacing Aleksandar Mitrović in 76 minute of the match against Bežanija, played on 27 May 2017.

== Career statistics ==
=== Club ===
As of 18 December 2017

Appearances and goals by club, season and competition
Club	Season	League			Cup		Continental		Other		Total	
Club	Season	Division	Apps	Goals	Apps	Goals	Apps	Goals	Apps	Goals	Apps	Goals
Sloboda Užice	2016–17	First League	1 (Note: Including final fixture match of the season against Bežanija)	0	0	0	—		—		1	0
Sloboda Užice	2017–18	First League	4	0	0	0	—		—		4	0
Sloboda Užice	Total		5	0	0	0	—		—		5	0
