= Nikola Lazović =

Serbian footballer

Personal information
- Date of birth: 13 November 1994 (age 31)
- Place of birth: Užice, FR Yugoslavia
- Position: Midfielder

Team information
- Current team: Jedinstvo Putevi

Senior career*
Years	Team	Apps	(Gls)
2012–2018	Zlatibor Čajetina		
2018–2019	Sloboda Užice	29	(2)
2019–2020	FK Tutin	17	(6)
2020–2021	Sloboda Užice	11	(0)
2021–2021	Jedinstvo Putevi	14	(3)
2021–2022	FK Trepča	14	(0)
2022–2022	Radnički Sombor	13	(0)
2022–	Jedinstvo Putevi	31	(9)
- * Club domestic league appearances and goals as of 2023-10-26

Nikola Lazović (November 13, 1994) is a Serbian footballer who plays with Jedinstvo Putevi and it's their capitain.

== Career ==
Lazović played at the youth level with FK Sloboda Užice. In 2013, he played in the Zlatibor District League with FK Zlatibor Čajetina and assisted in securing promotion to the Drina Zone League in his debut season. In 2016, he assisted Zlatibor in securing promotion to the Serbian League West. He returned to his former club Sloboda Užice in 2018 to play in the Serbian First League. Throughout his tenure with Sloboda he played in 29 matches, and recorded two goals in the First League. After a season in the First League he played with FK Tutin.

In 2020, he returned to play with Sloboda Užice for another season. In the summer of 2021, he played abroad in the Canadian Soccer League with Scarborough SC.
