= Lazar Milošev =

Serbian footballer

Personal information
- Date of birth: 20 June 1996 (age 30)
- Place of birth: Pančevo, FR Yugoslavia
- Height: 1.80 m (5 ft 11 in)
- Position: Striker

Team information
- Current team: Zemun
- Number: 22

Youth career
- Dinamo Pančevo
- OFK Beograd

Senior career*
Years	Team	Apps	(Gls)
2014–2015	OFK Beograd	0	(0)
2014–2015	→ Dinamo Pančevo (loan)	27	(6)
2015	Dinamo Pančevo	14	(11)
2016	Borac Sakule	27	(12)
2017–2018	Rad	29	(5)
2018–2019	Budućnost Dobanovci	35	(15)
2019–2020	Tabor Sežana	17	(0)
2020–2021	Napredak Kruševac	29	(1)
2021–2022	Železničar Pančevo	29	(11)
2022–2023	Metalac GM	34	(5)
2023–2024	Inđija	18	(4)
2024	Mladost Novi Sad	16	(0)
2025	Sloven	14	(5)
2025–	Zemun	30	(7)
- * Club domestic league appearances and goals as of 14 May 2026

Lazar Milošev (Serbian Cyrillic: Лазар Милошев; born 20 June 1996) is a Serbian footballer who plays as a forward for Zemun.

== Club career ==
=== Early years ===
Born in Pančevo, Milošev started playing football with local club Dinamo. Later, he was also with OFK Beograd youth academy. He made his first senior appearances with Dinamo Pančevo in the 2014–15 season of the Serbian League Vojvodina, where he appeared as a loaned player. In summer 2014, Dinamo also formed a satellite club Dinamo 1945, which became the successor from the 2015–16 season. Milošev continued playing with the club in the fifth level league PFL Pančevo, promoting himself as a second team scorer with 11 goals on 14 matches in the first half-season. Later he moved to Borac Sakule, where he spent the whole 2016, and was a scorer 12 times on 27 matches in the Serbian League Vojvodina. Milošev also received a call into the amateur squad under Football Association of Vojvodina for the UEFA Regions' Cup in 2016, after he played in final of the Vojvodina regional cup.

=== Rad ===
At the beginning of 2017, Milošev joined Serbian SuperLiga side Rad, signing a three-and-a-half-year professional contract with new club. He made his professional debut for Rad in 22 fixture match of the 2016–17 Serbian SuperLiga season against Partizan, played on 19 February 2017. He also scored his first goal for the club in 3–2 defeat against Vojvodina in the next fixture match. Playing with Rad, Milošev collected 12 matches and scored 3 goals at total until the end of season. He also started new season under Gordan Petrić, and continued playing under manager Slađan Nikolić, making 16 caps with 2 goals in the first half of the 2017–18 Serbian SuperLiga campaign. Through the spring half-season, Milošev made a single appearances under coach Zoran Milinković, replacing Bogdan Mladenović in 2–0 victory over OFK Bačka on 29 April 2018. Following the end of season, Milošev mutually terminated a contract with the club and left Rad as a free agent in May 2018.

=== Budućnost Dobanovci ===
In August 2018, Milošev joined the Serbian First League side Budućnost Dobanovci as a free player. He made his debut in the opening match of the 2018–19 Serbian First League campaign, against Bečej on 12 August 2018. In the second fixture match, played on 20 August same year, Milošev scored both goals in 2–0 away victory over Trayal. Milošev also scored in the next fixture, for 1–1 draw with Teleoptik.

=== Tabor Sežana ===
In June 2019, Milošev signed for newly promoted Slovenian PrvaLiga side Tabor Sežana.

== Career statistics ==
As of 16 January 2019

Appearances and goals by club, season and competition
Club	Season	League			Cup		Continental		Other		Total	
Club	Season	Division	Apps	Goals	Apps	Goals	Apps	Goals	Apps	Goals	Apps	Goals
Dinamo Pančevo	2014–15 (loan)	Serbian League Vojvodina	27	6	—		—		—		27	6
Dinamo Pančevo	2015–16	PFL Pančevo	14	11	—		—		—		14	11
Dinamo Pančevo	Total		41	17	—		—		—		41	17
Borac Sakule	2015–16	Serbian League Vojvodina	14	5	—		—		3 (Note: Including appearances in Vojvodina regional cup)	2	17	7
Borac Sakule	2016–17	Serbian League Vojvodina	13 (Note: Missed 11 fixture match of the season against Vršac)	7	—		—		—		13	7
Borac Sakule	Total		27	12	—		—		3	2	30	14
Rad	2016–17	Serbian SuperLiga	12	3	—		—		—		12	3
Rad	2017–18	Serbian SuperLiga	17	2	0	0	—		—		17	2
Rad	Total		29	5	0	0	—		—		29	5
Budućnost Dobanovci	2018–19	Serbian First League	21	8	0	0	—		—		21	8
Career total			118	42	0	0	—		3	2	121	44
