= Nebojša Bastajić =

Serbian footballer

Personal information
- Full name: Nebojša Bastajić
- Date of birth: 20 August 1990 (age 36)
- Place of birth: Belgrade, SFR Yugoslavia
- Height: 1.84 m (6 ft 0 in)
- Position: Forward

Team information
- Current team: Napredak Kruševac
- Number: 12

Youth career
- 2006–2009: Mladost Kupinovo

Senior career*
Years	Team	Apps	(Gls)
2008–2011	Mladost Kupinovo		
2011–2013	Voždovac	39	(8)
2013	Srem Jakovo	13	(2)
2014	Vataniakos	3	(0)
2014	Budućnost Dobanovci	13	(3)
2015	Bežanija	12	(0)
2015–2017	Smederevo 1924	35	(8)
2016	→ Bangkok (loan)		
2017–2018	Budućnost Dobanovci	28	(5)
2018	TSC	17	(1)
2019–2021	Inđija	77	(16)
2021–2022	Vojvodina	33	(2)
2022–2023	Napredak Kruševac	31	(5)
2023	Al-Bukiryah	4	(0)
2023–	Napredak Kruševac	79	(14)
- * Club domestic league appearances and goals as of 13 June 2026

Nebojša Bastajić (Serbian Cyrillic: Небојша Бастајић; born 20 August 1990) is a Serbian professional footballer who plays as a forward for Serbian SuperLiga club Napredak Kruševac.

On 1 July 2023, Bastajić joined Saudi Arabian club Al-Bukiryah.

== Honours ==
Voždovac

- Serbian League Belgrade: 2011–12

TSC

- Serbian First League: 2018–19
