= Milosh Tosheski =

Macedonian footballer (b. 1998)

Miloš Tošeski
Personal information
- Date of birth: 24 February 1998 (age 28)
- Place of birth: Belgrade, FR Yugoslavia
- Height: 1.78 m (5 ft 10 in)
- Position: Midfielder

Team information
- Current team: Kattaqo'rg'on FK
- Number: 19

Youth career
- Brodarac

Senior career*
Years	Team	Apps	(Gls)
2016–2018	Brodarac		
2018–2019	Zemun	37	(1)
2020	Rabotnički	21	(1)
2021	Brodarac		
2022	Atyrau	0	(0)
2022–2024	Spartak Subotica	51	(4)
2024–	Napredak Kruševac	55	(1)

International career^{‡}
2014	Macedonia U17	3	(0)
2019	Macedonia U21	2	(0)
- * Club domestic league appearances and goals as of 13 June 2026 ‡ National team caps and goals as of 26 October 2019

Miloš Tošeski (Macedonian: Милош Тошески; born 24 February 1998) is a Macedonian professional footballer who plays as a midfielder for Serbian club Napredak Kruševac.

== Club career ==
Born in Belgrade, FR Yugoslavia (now Serbia), Tošeski started his senior football career at local club FK Brodarac. Next, he joined Serbian SuperLiga club FK Zemun in summer 2018.

== Honours ==
Individual

- Serbian SuperLiga Player of the Week: 2022–23 (Round 33)
