= Ivan Živanović (footballer, born 1995) =

Serbian footballer

Personal information
- Date of birth: 21 August 1995 (age 31)
- Place of birth: Kragujevac, FR Yugoslavia
- Height: 1.83 m (6 ft 0 in)
- Position: Defender

Youth career
- Radnički Kragujevac

Senior career*
Years	Team	Apps	(Gls)
2013–2018	Radnički Kragujevac	47	(0)
2014	→ Pobeda Beloševac (loan)	12	(0)
2015	→ Šumadija 1903 (loan)	12	(0)
2018–2023	Šumadija 1903		
- * Club domestic league appearances and goals as of 26 May 2018

Ivan Živanović (Serbian Cyrillic: Иван Живановић; born 21 August 1995) is a Serbian retired football defender who last played for Šumadija 1903.

== Honours ==
Radnički Kragujevac

- Serbian League West: 2016–17
