= Igor Savić (footballer, born 1997) =

Serbian footballer

Personal information
- Full name: Igor Savić
- Date of birth: 31 January 1997 (age 29)
- Place of birth: Čačak, FR Yugoslavia
- Height: 1.80 m (5 ft 11 in)
- Position: Forward

Team information
- Current team: Omladinac Zablaće

Youth career
- 2003–2016: Borac Čačak

Senior career*
Years	Team	Apps	(Gls)
2015–2017	Borac Čačak	17	(1)
2018	Mladost Lučani	3	(0)
2018–2019	Metalac Gornji Milanovac	47	(11)
2020	Borac Čačak	17	(3)
2021–2023	Trayal Kruševac	49	(9)
2023	Borac Čačak		
2024-	Omladinac Zablaće		

International career
2013–2014	Serbia U17		
- * Club domestic league appearances and goals as of 29 May 2023

Igor Savić (Serbian Cyrillic: Игор Савић; born 31 January 1997) is a Serbian footballer who plays for Omladinac Zablaće.

== Club career ==
Born in Čačak, he made his first football steps, when he was 6 years old. As a member of youth school, Savić signed a scholarship contract with Borac Čačak on 9 November 2012. He made his SuperLiga debut in 9th fixture of the 2015–16 season, against Novi Pazar.

== International career ==
Savić was a member of Serbia U-16, Serbia U-17 and Serbia U-18 national teams.

== Career statistics ==
As of 10 December 2016

Club	Season	League			Cup		Continental		Other		Total	
Club	Season	Division	Apps	Goals	Apps	Goals	Apps	Goals	Apps	Goals	Apps	Goals
Borac Čačak	2015–16	Serbian SuperLiga	2	0	1	0	–	–	–	–	3	0
Borac Čačak	2016–17	Serbian SuperLiga	9	0	2	0	–	–	–	–	11	0
Borac Čačak	Total		11	0	3	0	–	–	–	–	14	0
