= Stefan Milojević (footballer, born January 1989) =

Serbian footballer

Personal information
- Full name: Stefan Milojević
- Date of birth: 29 January 1989 (age 37)
- Place of birth: Belgrade, SFR Yugoslavia
- Height: 1.76 m (5 ft 9 in)
- Position: Attacking midfielder

Team information
- Current team: Hajduk Beška

Youth career
- Partizan

Senior career*
Years	Team	Apps	(Gls)
2007–2009	→ Teleoptik (loan)	43	(8)
2009–2010	Teleoptik	14	(2)
2010	→ Voždovac (loan)	15	(3)
2010–2012	Banat Zrenjanin	75	(3)
2013–2016	Borac Čačak	68	(2)
2016	Bežanija	11	(0)
2017	Novi Pazar	11	(0)
2017	KPV	4	(0)
2017	Kolubara	6	(0)
2018	Trayal Kruševac	3	(2)
2019	Žarkovo	22	(0)
2019-2020	Dinamo 1945		
2020-2021	1. Maj Ruma		
2022	Omladinac Novi Banovci		
2022	Železničar Inđija		
2023-2024	Sloboda Donji Tovarnik		
2024-	Hajduk Beška		
- * Club domestic league appearances and goals as of 4 April 2018

Stefan Milojević (Serbian Cyrillic: Стефан Милојевић; born 29 January 1989) is a Serbian footballer who plays as a midfielder for Hajduk Beška.
