= Filip Jović (footballer, born 1997) =

Serbian footballer

Personal information
- Full name: Filip Jović
- Date of birth: 6 August 1997 (age 29)
- Place of birth: Kruševac, FR Yugoslavia
- Height: 1.80 m (5 ft 11 in)
- Position: Defensive midfielder

Youth career
- Napredak Kruševac

Senior career*
Years	Team	Apps	(Gls)
2016–2017	Partizan	0	(0)
2016–2017	→ Teleoptik (loan)		
2017–2018	Teleoptik	25	(0)
2018–2019	Napredak Kruševac	15	(0)
2019	Novi Pazar	14	(0)
2020–2021	Radnik Surdulica	29	(1)
2021	Rukh Brest	23	(1)
2022–2023	Proodeftiki	5	(0)
2023–2025	Napredak Kruševac	31	(0)
2025	Dynamo Brest	5	(0)

International career
2016	Serbia U19	3	(0)
- * Club domestic league appearances and goals as of 3 April 2026

Filip Jović (Serbian Cyrillic: Филип Јовић; born 6 August 1997) is a Serbian professional footballer who plays as a midfielder.
