= Simović =

Simović (Serbian: Симовић, Ukrainian: Сімович) is a Serbo-Croatian and Ukrainian surname, a patronymic derived from given name Simo. It is historically anglicized into Simovich. It may refer to:

- Aleksandar Simović, co-conspirator in the assassination of Zoran Đinđić
- Aleksandar Simović (born 1992), Serbian footballer
- Dušan Simović (1882–1962), Serbian military leader, Prime Minister of Yugoslavia
- Edgardo Simovic (born 1975), Uruguayan soccer player
- Ljubomir Simović (1935–2025), Serbian writer, playwright, scriptwriter, and academic
- Marko Simović (born 1987), Montenegrin handball player
- Miodrag Simović (born 1952), current Judge of the Constitutional Court of Bosnia and Herzegovina
- Slobodan Simović (born 1989), Serbian footballer
- Zoran Simović (born 1954), Montenegrin footballer

== See also ==
- Simić
- Simonović
- Simeonović
- Simeunović
- Šimić
- Šimunić
- Šimunović
