= 2025–26 EHF European League =

European club handball tournament

EHF European League
- 2025–26
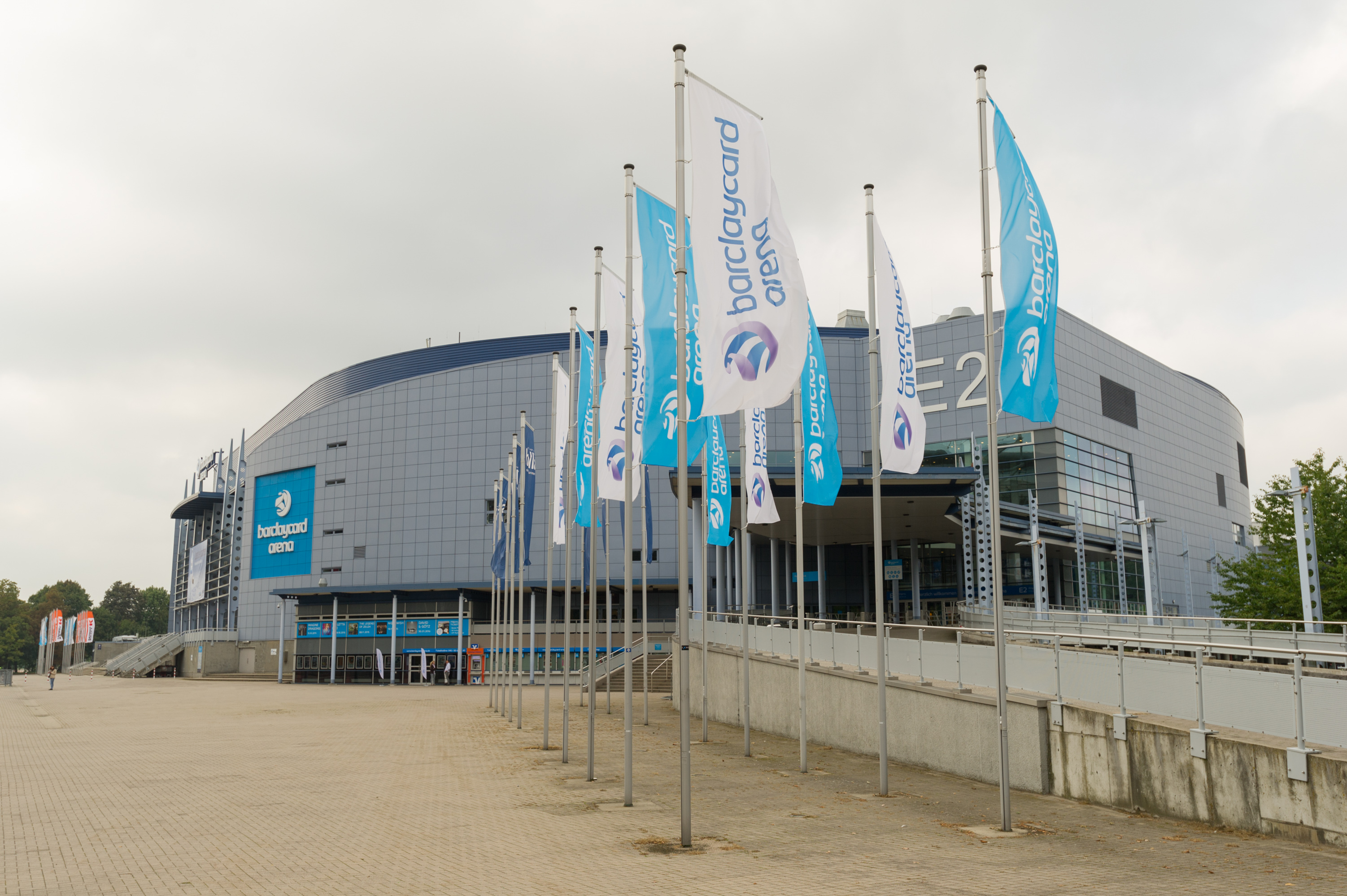
- The EHF Finals will be played at the Barclays Arena in Hamburg, Germany.

Tournament information
- Sport: Handball
- Date: Qualification round: 30 August – 7 September 2025; Group stage: 14 October – 2 December 2025; Main round: 17 February – 10 March 2026; Knockout stage: 31 March – 5 May 2026; Final Four: 30–31 May 2026
- Tournament format(s): Round Robin and Knockout stage
- Teams: Qualification round: 24 (Note: From 17 countries.); Group stage: 32 (Note: From 17 or 18 nations); Knockout stage: 12; Total: 44 (from 18 countries)
- Website: EHF European League

Final positions
- Champions: (Germany) MT Melsungen
- Runner-up: (Germany) THW Kiel

Tournament statistics
- MVP: (Montenegro) Nebojša Simić
- Top scorer: (Sweden) Axel Månsson (98 goals)

The 2025–26 EHF European League was the 45th season of Europe's secondary club handball tournament organised by European Handball Federation (EHF), and the 6th season since it was renamed from the EHF Cup to the EHF European League.

The defending champions are SG Flensburg-Handewitt, who were unable to repeat their success from the previous year. MT Melsungen won the EHF European League 2026, thus achieving their first major title in the club's history.

== Format ==
- Qualification Round: 24 teams will be drawn into 12 different home and away ties. The 12 winners will advance to the group stage.
- Group Stage: The 20 teams already qualified along with the 12 winners of the qualification round will be drawn into 8 groups of 4 teams each, where they will play in a double round-robin format. The top 2 teams in each group will progress to the main round. Teams from the same country can't be drawn into the same group.
- Main Round: The 16 group winners and runners-up will be placed in 4 groups of 4 teams each where they will play a single round-robin. The winners will advance directly to the quarterfinals, while 2nd and 3rd placed teams will qualify for the play-offs.
- Play-offs: The 2nd and 3rd placed teams from each group in the main round will play in 4 different home and away ties. The winners will progress to the quarterfinals.
- Quarter-finals: The main round group winners will face a play-off winner to determine who makes it to the European League finals.
- EL finals: They will be played in a Final 4 format similar to the Champions League.

== Rankings ==
The rankings are based on the performances of each club from a respective country from a three-year period.

- Associations 1–2 can have four clubs qualify.
- Associations 3–9 can have three clubs qualify.
- Associations 10–18 can have two clubs qualify.
- Associations below the top 18 are allowed to enter apply one club for a potential wildcard.

Rank	Association	Average points	Teams
1	Germany	145.67	4
2	Portugal	96.67	4
3	France	79.33	3
4	Croatia	68.33	4
5	Denmark	63.00	3
6	Switzerland	59.67	3
7	Spain	58.33	4
8	Sweden	55.00	4
9	Poland	46.33	2
10	Romania	38.00	2
11	Slovenia	30.67	2
12	North Macedonia	30,00	2
13	Hungary	29.33	1
14	Iceland	28.50	2

Rank	Association	Average points	Teams
15	Russia	25.00	0
16	Ukraine	22.50	0
17	Slovakia	22.00	1
18	Finland	14.50	0
19	Greece	14.33	0
20	Norway	12.3	1
21	Serbia	10.67	1
22	Bosnia and Herzegovina	10.00	0
22	Montenegro	10.00	0
24	Austria	9.33	0
25	Israel	0.50	0
25	Turkey	0.50	0
N/A	Czech Republic	0.00	1
N/A	(N/A) Everyone else	0.00	0

=== Ranking facts ===
Biggest rise
Pos	Team	Old	New	Move
1	Romania	17	10	▲ +7
2	Croatia	6	4	▲ +2
2	Denmark	7	5	▲ +2
2	Slovenia	13	11	▲ +2
2	Iceland	16	14	▲ +2
2	Ukraine	18	16	▲ +2
2	Norway	22	20	▲ +2

Biggest fall
Pos	Team	Old	New	Move
1	Austria	15	24	▼ –9
2	Russia	10	15	▼ –5
3	Poland	5	9	▼ –4
3	Turkey	21	25	▼ –4

New entries
Bosnia and Herzegovina
Montenegro

Entries leaving
Belarus
Luxembourg

== Qualified teams ==
The full list of teams qualified for each stage of the 2024–25 EHF European League was announced on 8 July 2025.

The labels in the parentheses show how each team qualified for the place of its starting round:

- CW: Cup winners
- CR: Cup runners-up
- 1st, ..., 5th: League position of the previous season

Group stage
(Germany) MT Melsungen (3rd)	(Germany) THW Kiel (4th)	(Germany) SG Flensburg-Handewitt ^{EL} (5th)	(Portugal) FC Porto (2nd)
(Portugal) SL Benfica (3rd)	(France) Montpellier Handball (3rd)	(France) Fenix Toulouse (4th)	(Croatia) RK Nexe (2nd)
(Denmark) Fredericia HK (3rd) (Note: To decide Denmark's representatives, the regular season standings are used.)	(Switzerland) Kadetten Schaffhausen (1st)	(Spain) Fraikin BM Granollers (2nd)	(Spain) Abanca Ademar León (CR)
(Sweden) IFK Kristianstad (2nd) (Note: To decide Sweden's representatives, the regular season standings are used.)	(Poland) REBUD KPR Ostrovia Ostrów Wielkopolski (3rd)	(Romania) AHC Potaissa Turda (2nd)	(Slovenia) RD LL Grosist Slovan (1st)
(North Macedonia) HC Vardar 1961 (2nd)	(Hungary) FTC-Green Collect (3rd)	(Iceland) Knattspyrnufélagið Fram (1st)	(Slovakia) Tatran Prešov (1st)
Qualification round
(Germany) TSV Hannover-Burgdorf (6th)	(Portugal) Maritimo da Madeira Andebol SAD (4th)	(Portugal) ABC de Braga Lusíadas Saúde (5th)	(France) Saint-Raphael Var Handball (5th)
(Croatia) MRK Sesvete (3rd)	(Croatia) MRK Čakovec (4th)	(Croatia) MRK Dugo Selo (CR)	(Denmark) Mors-Thy Håndbold (4th)
(Denmark) SAH - Skanderborg (5th, CR)	(Switzerland) BSV Bern (2nd)	(Switzerland) HC Kriens-Luzern (3rd, CW)	(Spain) Bathco BM Torrelavega (3rd)
(Spain) Irudek Bidasoa Irún (4th)	(Sweden) HK Malmö (3rd)	(Sweden) HF Karlskrona (4th)	(Sweden) IK Sävehof (5th)
(Poland) KGHM Chrobry Głogów (5th)	(Romania) CS Minaur Baia Mare (4th)	(Slovenia) RK Gorenje Velenje (2nd)	(North Macedonia) HC Alkaloid ^{EC} (3rd)
(Iceland) Stjarnan (CR)	(Norway) Elverum Håndball (1st)	(Serbia) RK Partizan ^{WC} ^{SPL} (1st)	(Czech Republic) HCB Karviná ^{WC} ^{SPL} (1st)

- ^{EL}: European League title holders
- ^{EC}: European Cup title holders
- ^{WC}: Accepted Wildcard
- ^{SPL}: Special Play Off teams

== Round and draw dates ==
=== Schedule ===
Phase	Round	Draw date	Round date
Qualification round	First leg	15 July 2025	30–31 August 2025
Qualification round	Second leg	15 July 2025	6–7 September 2025
Group stage	Matchday 1	18 July 2025	14 October 2025
Group stage	Matchday 2	18 July 2025	21 October 2025
Group stage	Matchday 3	18 July 2025	11 November 2025
Group stage	Matchday 4	18 July 2025	18 November 2025
Group stage	Matchday 5	18 July 2025	25 November 2025
Group stage	Matchday 6	18 July 2025	2 December 2025
Main Round	Matchday 7	18 July 2025	17 February 2026
Main Round	Matchday 8	18 July 2025	24 February 2026
Main Round	Matchday 9	18 July 2025	3 March 2026
Main Round	Matchday 10	18 July 2025	10 March 2026
Play offs	First leg	no draw	31 March 2026
Play offs	Second leg	no draw	7 April 2026
Quarterfinals	First leg	no draw	28 April 2026
Quarterfinals	Second leg	no draw	5 May 2026
Final four	Semi-finals	TBD	30 May 2026
Final four	Final and Third place game	TBD	31 May 2026

== Qualification round ==
The draw for the qualification round was conducted on 15 July 2025 in Vienna, Austria. The eleven winners on aggregate advanced to the group stage. The first legs were held on 30 to 31 August 2025 while the second legs were held on 6–7 September 2025.

Team 1	Agg.	Team 2	1st leg	2nd leg
TSV Hannover-Burgdorf (Germany)	66–55	(North Macedonia) HC Alkaloid	37–27	29–28
Mors-Thy Håndbold (Denmark)	64–80	(France) Saint-Raphael Var Handball	32–45	32–35
RK Gorenje Velenje (Slovenia)	50–59	(Switzerland) HC Kriens-Luzern	25–27	25–32
Irudek Bidasoa Irún (Spain)	65–50	(Portugal) ABC de Braga Lusíadas Saúde	35–26	30–24
KGHM Chrobry Głogów (Poland)	65–70	(Sweden) HF Karlskrona	30–33	35–37
CS Minaur Baia Mare (Romania)	53–52	(Iceland) Stjarnan	26–26	27–26
HK Malmö (Sweden)	60–71	(Sweden) IK Sävehof	24–33	36–38
MRK Dugo Selo (Croatia)	56–64	(Croatia) MRK Sesvete	32–29	24–35
Elverum Håndball (Norway)	67–56	(Spain) Bathco BM Torrelavega	38–28	29–28
MRK Čakovec (Croatia)	55–73	(Switzerland) BSV Bern	28–31	27–42
SAH - Skanderborg (Denmark)	74–56	(Portugal) Maritimo da Madeira Andebol SAD	38–25	36–31

=== Special Qualification Play off ===
Unlike the other Play offs, the losers of this tie will drop down to the European Cup.

Team 1	Agg.	Team 2	1st leg	2nd leg
RK Partizan (Serbia)	61–53	(Czech Republic) HCB Karviná	31–27	30–26

== Group stage ==
Location of teams of the 2025–26 EHF European League group stage
Brown: Group A; Red: Group B; Orange: Group C; Yellow: Group D;
Green: Group E; Blue: Group F; Purple: Group G; Pink: Group H

The draw for the group stage was conducted on 18 July 2025 at the EHF office in Vienna.

In the group stage, teams were ranked according to points (2 points for a win, 1 point for a draw, 0 points for a loss). After completion of the group stage, if two or more teams have scored the same number of points, the ranking will be determined as follows:

Tiebreakers
1. Highest number of points in matches between the teams directly involved;
2. Superior goal difference in matches between the teams directly involved;
3. Highest number of goals scored in matches between the teams directly involved;
4. Superior goal difference in all matches of the group;
5. Highest number of plus goals in all matches of the group;
6. Drawing of Lots

=== Group A ===
Pos	Team	Pld	W	D	L	GF	GA	GD	Pts	Qualification	FLE	BID	SRA	POT
1	(Germany) SG Flensburg-Handewitt	6	6	0	0	218	180	+38	12	Main Round	—	38–35	32–30	46–28
2	(Spain) Irudek Bidasoa Irún	6	3	0	3	201	194	+7	6 (Note: Irudek Bidasoa Irún 65–60 Saint-Raphaël Var Handball)	Main Round	32–33	—	33–25	35–30
3	(France) Saint-Raphaël Var Handball	6	3	0	3	195	182	+13	6		29–36	35–32	—	42–24
4	(Romania) AHC Potaissa Turda	6	0	0	6	166	224	−58	0		26–33	33–34	25–34	—

Source: EHF

=== Group B ===
Pos	Team	Pld	W	D	L	GF	GA	GD	Pts	Qualification	KIE	MON	OST	BRN
1	(Germany) THW Kiel	6	6	0	0	196	146	+50	12	Main Round	—	27–18	34–21	37–27
2	(France) Montpellier Handball	6	4	0	2	195	168	+27	8	Main Round	28–30	—	37–26	37–29
3	(Poland) KPR Ostrovia	6	1	1	4	157	198	−41	3		25–33	25–38	—	32–28
4	(Switzerland) BSV Bern	6	0	1	5	170	206	−36	1		27–35	31–37	28–28	—

Source: EHF

=== Group C ===
Pos	Team	Pld	W	D	L	GF	GA	GD	Pts	Qualification	SAH	GRA	SLO	MIN
1	(Denmark) SAH - Skanderborg	6	5	0	1	214	168	+46	10	Main Round	—	28–29	34–30	39–26
2	(Spain) Fraikin BM Granollers	6	3	1	2	169	175	−6	7	Main Round	26–31	—	27–35	29–28
3	(Slovenia) RD LL Grosist Slovan	6	2	0	4	181	189	−8	4		30–37	29–34	—	35–29
4	(Romania) CS Minaur Baia Mare	6	1	1	4	162	194	−32	3		27–45	24–24	28–22	—

Source: EHF

=== Group D ===
Pos	Team	Pld	W	D	L	GF	GA	GD	Pts	Qualification	POR	ELV	LUZ	FRA
1	(Portugal) FC Porto	6	5	0	1	228	169	+59	10	Main Round	—	29–31	44–31	44–30
2	(Norway) Elverum Håndball	6	4	0	2	198	179	+19	8	Main Round	25–29	—	31–34	38–24
3	(Switzerland) HC Kriens-Luzern	6	3	0	3	200	213	−13	6		26–44	34–38	—	40–25
4	(Iceland) Knattspyrnufélagið Fram	6	0	0	6	165	230	−65	0		26–38	29–35	31–35	—

Source: EHF

=== Group E ===
Pos	Team	Pld	W	D	L	GF	GA	GD	Pts	Qualification	MEL	BEN	FTC	KAR
1	(Germany) MT Melsungen	6	6	0	0	180	163	+17	12	Main Round	—	28–26	33–27	35–34
2	(Portugal) SL Benfica	6	3	0	3	191	181	+10	6 (Note: SL Benfica 69–58 FTC-Green Collect)	Main Round	26–30	—	38–25	36–33
3	(Hungary) FTC-Green Collect	6	3	0	3	173	190	−17	6		25–28	33–31	—	31–29
4	(Sweden) HF Karlskrona	6	0	0	6	184	194	−10	0		25–26	32–34	31–32	—

Source: EHF

=== Group F ===
Pos	Team	Pld	W	D	L	GF	GA	GD	Pts	Qualification	VAR	KRI	SEV	FEN
1	(North Macedonia) HC Vardar 1961	6	5	0	1	203	176	+27	10	Main Round	—	35–30	34–29	37–35
2	(Sweden) IFK Kristianstad	6	4	1	1	186	179	+7	9	Main Round	32–31	—	28–27	34–26
3	(Croatia) MRK Sesvete	6	2	1	3	181	195	−14	5		24–38	32–32	—	32–31
4	(France) Fenix Toulouse	6	0	0	6	178	198	−20	0		26–28	28–30	32–37	—

Source: EHF

=== Group G ===
Pos	Team	Pld	W	D	L	GF	GA	GD	Pts	Qualification	HAN	FRE	SAV	TAT
1	(Germany) TSV Hannover-Burgdorf	6	5	0	1	196	173	+23	10	Main Round	—	31–34	27–25	40–28
2	(Denmark) Fredericia HK	6	3	1	2	193	181	+12	7	Main Round	29–31	—	29–33	38–30
3	(Sweden) IK Sävehof	6	2	2	2	178	173	+5	6		28–30	29–29	—	33–28
4	(Slovakia) Tatran Prešov	6	0	1	5	172	212	−40	1		29–37	27–34	30–30	—

Source: EHF

=== Group H ===
Pos	Team	Pld	W	D	L	GF	GA	GD	Pts	Qualification	NEX	KAD	PAR	ADE
1	(Croatia) RK Nexe	6	3	1	2	175	169	+6	7	Main Round	—	29–30	30–22	29–28
2	(Switzerland) Kadetten Schaffhausen	6	3	0	3	176	161	+15	6 (Note: Kadetten Schaffhausen 58–48 RK Partizan)	Main Round	31–32	—	32–19	30–22
3	(Serbia) RK Partizan	6	3	0	3	147	162	−15	6		30–27	29–26	—	25–18
4	(Spain) Abanca Ademar León	6	2	1	3	155	161	−6	5		28–28	30–27	29–22	—

Source: EHF

== Main round ==
In the Main Round, the remaining sixteen teams played in four groups of four. Teams were matched with two opponents they had not previously played against in the Group Stage, while points against the teams that advanced from the same group were carried over. At the end of the Main Round, the four group winners advanced to the Quarterfinals, while 2nd- and 3rd-placed teams from each group qualified for the Play-offs.

=== Group I ===
Pos	Team	Pld	W	D	L	GF	GA	GD	Pts	Qualification	KIE	FLE	MON	BID
1	(Germany) THW Kiel	6	6	0	0	189	157	+32	12	Quarterfinals	—	36–29	27–18	27–20
2	(Germany) SG Flensburg-Handewitt	6	3	0	3	202	205	−3	6 (Note: SG Flensburg-Handewitt 72–70 Montpellier Handball)	Play Offs	30–32	—	40–35	38–35
3	(France) Montpellier Handball	6	3	0	3	190	196	−6	6	Play Offs	28–30	35–32	—	38–33
4	(Spain) Irudek Bidasoa Irún	6	0	0	6	186	209	−23	0		32–37	32–33	34–36	—

Source: EHF

=== Group II ===
Pos	Team	Pld	W	D	L	GF	GA	GD	Pts	Qualification	POR	ELV	SAH	GRA
1	(Portugal) FC Porto	6	4	0	2	179	178	+1	8 (Note: FC Porto 58–56 Elverum Håndball)	Quarterfinals	—	29–31	28−33	34−33
2	(Norway) Elverum Håndball	6	4	0	2	178	169	+9	8	Play Offs	25–29	—	31−24	37−28
3	(Denmark) SAH - Skanderborg	6	3	0	3	177	169	+8	6	Play Offs	29−30	32−25	—	28–29
4	(Spain) Fraikin BM Granollers	6	1	0	5	170	188	−18	2		27−29	27−29	26–31	—

Source: EHF

=== Group III ===
Pos	Team	Pld	W	D	L	GF	GA	GD	Pts	Qualification	VAR	MEL	KRI	BEN
1	(North Macedonia) HC Vardar 1961	6	4	0	2	205	187	+18	8	Quarterfinals	—	37−33	35–30	33−27
2	(Germany) MT Melsungen	6	3	0	3	179	183	−4	6 (Note: MT Melsungen 63–60 IFK Kristianstad)	Play Offs	25−34	—	33−29	28–26
3	(Sweden) IFK Kristianstad	6	3	0	3	186	189	−3	6	Play Offs	32–31	31–30	—	34−38
4	(Portugal) SL Benfica	6	2	0	4	179	190	−11	4		40−35	26–30	22−30	—

Source: EHF

=== Group IV ===
Pos	Team	Pld	W	D	L	GF	GA	GD	Pts	Qualification	HAN	NEX	FRE	KAD
1	(Germany) TSV Hannover-Burgdorf	6	4	0	2	186	168	+18	8	Quarterfinals	—	34−28	31–34	31−27
2	(Croatia) RK Nexe	6	3	0	3	181	178	+3	6 (Note: RK Nexe 66–60 Fredericia HK)	Play Offs	26−23	—	33−34	29–30
3	(Denmark) Fredericia HK	6	3	0	3	183	189	−6	6	Play Offs	29–31	26−33	—	30−32
4	(Switzerland) Kadetten Schaffhausen	6	2	0	4	173	188	−15	4		24−36	31–32	29−30	—

Source: EHF

== Knockout stage ==
In the play-offs, eight teams ranked 2nd and 3rd in Main Round Groups I through IV played against each other in home-and-away matches.

The four winning teams advanced to the Quarterfinals, where they were joined by winners of Main Round Groups I through IV for another round of home-and-away matches.

The four Quarterfinal winners qualified for the Final Four tournament.

=== Play-offs ===
==== Overview ====
Team 1	Agg.	Team 2	1st leg	2nd leg
SAH - Skanderborg (Denmark)	65–71	(Germany) SG Flensburg-Handewitt	32–38	33–33
Montpellier Handball (France)	67–59	(Norway) Elverum Håndball	36–24	31–35
Fredericia HK (Denmark)	61–64	(Germany) MT Melsungen	35–29	26–35
IFK Kristianstad (Sweden)	61–68	(Croatia) RK Nexe	34–36	27–32

===== Matches =====
31 March 2026; 18:45	SAH - Skanderborg (Denmark)	32–38	(Germany) SG Flensburg-Handewitt	Djurslands Bank Arena, Aarhus; Attendance: 3,522; Referees: Horváth, Marton (HUN)
31 March 2026; 18:45	Lærke 8	(15–18)	Golla 9	Djurslands Bank Arena, Aarhus; Attendance: 3,522; Referees: Horváth, Marton (HUN)
31 March 2026; 18:45	3× (suspension)	Report	1× (yellow card) 3× (suspension)	Djurslands Bank Arena, Aarhus; Attendance: 3,522; Referees: Horváth, Marton (HUN)

7 April 2026; 18:45	SG Flensburg-Handewitt (Germany)	33–33	(Denmark) SAH - Skanderborg	GP Joule Arena, Flensburg; Attendance: 4,100; Referees: Sirbu, Serdiuc (MDA)
7 April 2026; 18:45	Jakobsen 7	(16–13)	Kristján 11	GP Joule Arena, Flensburg; Attendance: 4,100; Referees: Sirbu, Serdiuc (MDA)
7 April 2026; 18:45	3× (suspension)	Report	3× (suspension)	GP Joule Arena, Flensburg; Attendance: 4,100; Referees: Sirbu, Serdiuc (MDA)

31 March 2026; 20:45	Montpellier Handball (France)	36–24	(Norway) Elverum Håndball	Sud de France Arena, Montpellier; Attendance: 2,800; Referees: Vitaku, Vitaku (KOS)
31 March 2026; 20:45	Thurin 8	(17–9)	Gjerdalen 7	Sud de France Arena, Montpellier; Attendance: 2,800; Referees: Vitaku, Vitaku (KOS)
31 March 2026; 20:45	1× (yellow card) 6× (suspension)	Report	3× (suspension)	Sud de France Arena, Montpellier; Attendance: 2,800; Referees: Vitaku, Vitaku (KOS)

7 April 2026; 20:45	Elverum Håndball (Norway)	35–31	(France) Montpellier Handball	Terningen Arena, Elverum; Attendance: 1,446; Referees: Uhlir, Benus (CZE)
7 April 2026; 20:45	Máthé, Lukács 6	(18–19)	Monte, Balaguer 5	Terningen Arena, Elverum; Attendance: 1,446; Referees: Uhlir, Benus (CZE)
7 April 2026; 20:45	1× (yellow card) 5× (suspension)	Report	5× (suspension)	Terningen Arena, Elverum; Attendance: 1,446; Referees: Uhlir, Benus (CZE)

31 March 2026; 20:45	Fredericia HK (Denmark)	35–29	(Germany) MT Melsungen	Middelfart Sparekasse Arena, Fredericia; Attendance: 1,188; Referees: Cindric, Gonzurek (CRO)
31 March 2026; 20:45	Pevnov 8	(19–13)	Kastening 7	Middelfart Sparekasse Arena, Fredericia; Attendance: 1,188; Referees: Cindric, Gonzurek (CRO)
31 March 2026; 20:45	5× (suspension)	Report	2× (suspension)	Middelfart Sparekasse Arena, Fredericia; Attendance: 1,188; Referees: Cindric, Gonzurek (CRO)

7 April 2026; 18:45	MT Melsungen (Germany)	35–26	(Denmark) Fredericia HK	Rothenbach-Halle, Kassel; Attendance: 1,617; Referees: Bozhinovski, Nachevski (MKD)
7 April 2026; 18:45	Darmoul 9	(17–12)	Kjeldgaard 7	Rothenbach-Halle, Kassel; Attendance: 1,617; Referees: Bozhinovski, Nachevski (MKD)
7 April 2026; 18:45	3× (suspension)	Report	1× (suspension)	Rothenbach-Halle, Kassel; Attendance: 1,617; Referees: Bozhinovski, Nachevski (MKD)

31 March 2026; 18:45	IFK Kristianstad (Sweden)	34–36	(Croatia) RK Nexe	Kristianstad Arena, Kristianstad; Attendance: 2,272; Referees: Thiyagarajah, Thiyagarajah (GER)
31 March 2026; 18:45	Månsson 7	(21–18)	Lučin 8	Kristianstad Arena, Kristianstad; Attendance: 2,272; Referees: Thiyagarajah, Thiyagarajah (GER)
31 March 2026; 18:45	3× (suspension)	Report	8× (suspension) 1× (red card)	Kristianstad Arena, Kristianstad; Attendance: 2,272; Referees: Thiyagarajah, Thiyagarajah (GER)

7 April 2026; 20:45	RK Nexe (Croatia)	32–27	(Sweden) IFK Kristianstad	OS Kralja Tomislava, Našice; Attendance: 2,000; Referees: Cernavskis, Bogdanovs (LAT)
7 April 2026; 20:45	Lučin 6	(14–15)	Månsson, Aðalsteinsson 5	OS Kralja Tomislava, Našice; Attendance: 2,000; Referees: Cernavskis, Bogdanovs (LAT)
7 April 2026; 20:45	1× (yellow card) 3× (suspension)	Report	2× (yellow card) 3× (suspension)	OS Kralja Tomislava, Našice; Attendance: 2,000; Referees: Cernavskis, Bogdanovs (LAT)

=== Quarterfinals ===
==== Overview ====
Team 1	Agg.	Team 2	1st leg	2nd leg
RK Nexe (Croatia)	60–60; 2–4 (p)	(Germany) THW Kiel	33–30	27–30
MT Melsungen (Germany)	47–46	(Portugal) FC Porto	28–23	19–23
Montpellier Handball (France)	57–50	(North Macedonia) HC Vardar 1961	33–23	24–27
SG Flensburg-Handewitt (Germany)	82–74	(Germany) TSV Hannover-Burgdorf	39–39	43–35

===== Matches =====
28 April 2026; 18:45	RK Nexe (Croatia)	33–30	(Germany) THW Kiel	OS Kralja Tomislava, Našice; Attendance: 2,000; Referees: Pirvu, Potirniche (ROU)
28 April 2026; 18:45	Lučin 9	(16–13)	Reinkind, Ankermann 5	OS Kralja Tomislava, Našice; Attendance: 2,000; Referees: Pirvu, Potirniche (ROU)
28 April 2026; 18:45	2× (yellow card) 1× (suspension)	Report	1× (yellow card) 6× (suspension) 1× (red card)	OS Kralja Tomislava, Našice; Attendance: 2,000; Referees: Pirvu, Potirniche (ROU)

5 May 2026
20:45
THW Kiel (Germany)
34–29
(Croatia) RK Nexe
Wunderino Arena, Kiel
Attendance: 6,005
Referees: Brkic, Jusufhodzic (AUT)
Johansson, Zerbe 10
(17–15)
Lučin 10
4× (suspension)
Report
1× (yellow card) 4× (suspension)

FT: 30–27 Pen: 4–2

28 April 2026; 20:45	MT Melsungen (Germany)	28–23	(Portugal) FC Porto	Rothenbach-Halle, Kassel; Attendance: 2,561; Referees: Pagh, Thygesen (DEN)
28 April 2026; 20:45	Mandić 8	(12–8)	Silva 6	Rothenbach-Halle, Kassel; Attendance: 2,561; Referees: Pagh, Thygesen (DEN)
28 April 2026; 20:45	2× (suspension)	Report	1× (yellow card) 2× (suspension)	Rothenbach-Halle, Kassel; Attendance: 2,561; Referees: Pagh, Thygesen (DEN)

5 May 2026; 20:45	FC Porto (Portugal)	23–19	(Germany) MT Melsungen	Dragão Arena, Porto; Attendance: 1,085; Referees: Budzak, Zahradnik (SVK)
5 May 2026; 20:45	Silva, Martínez 4	(12–9)	Drosten 7	Dragão Arena, Porto; Attendance: 1,085; Referees: Budzak, Zahradnik (SVK)
5 May 2026; 20:45	1× (yellow card) 5× (suspension)	Report	1× (yellow card) 2× (suspension)	Dragão Arena, Porto; Attendance: 1,085; Referees: Budzak, Zahradnik (SVK)

28 April 2026; 20:45	Montpellier Handball (France)	33–23	(North Macedonia) HC Vardar 1961	Sud de France Arena, Montpellier; Attendance: 2,950; Referees: Kull, Tint (EST)
28 April 2026; 20:45	Villeminot, Monte 6	(12–10)	Mitrović, Silva 6	Sud de France Arena, Montpellier; Attendance: 2,950; Referees: Kull, Tint (EST)
28 April 2026; 20:45	2× (suspension)	Report	1× (yellow card) 3× (suspension) 1× (red card)	Sud de France Arena, Montpellier; Attendance: 2,950; Referees: Kull, Tint (EST)

5 May 2026; 20:45	HC Vardar 1961 (North Macedonia)	27–24	(France) Montpellier Handball	Jane Sandanski Arena, Skopje; Attendance: 4,500; Referees: Biro, Kiss (HUN)
5 May 2026; 20:45	Malus 6	(17–12)	three players 5	Jane Sandanski Arena, Skopje; Attendance: 4,500; Referees: Biro, Kiss (HUN)
5 May 2026; 20:45	1× (yellow card) 3× (suspension) 1× (red card)	Report	1× (yellow card) 2× (suspension)	Jane Sandanski Arena, Skopje; Attendance: 4,500; Referees: Biro, Kiss (HUN)

29 April 2026; 20:45	SG Flensburg-Handewitt (Germany)	39–39	(Germany) TSV Hannover-Burgdorf	GP Joule Arena, Flensburg; Attendance: 3,543; Referees: Pétursson, Þrastarson (ISL)
29 April 2026; 20:45	Pytlick, Jakobsen 8	(20–19)	Pedersen 11	GP Joule Arena, Flensburg; Attendance: 3,543; Referees: Pétursson, Þrastarson (ISL)
29 April 2026; 20:45	4× (suspension) 1× (red card)	Report	1× (yellow card) 4× (suspension)	GP Joule Arena, Flensburg; Attendance: 3,543; Referees: Pétursson, Þrastarson (ISL)

5 May 2026; 18:45	TSV Hannover-Burgdorf (Germany)	35–43	(Germany) SG Flensburg-Handewitt	Swiss Life Hall, Hannover; Attendance: 4,100; Referees: Metalari, Nikolovski (MKD)
5 May 2026; 18:45	Tissier 10	(20–22)	Jakobsen 10	Swiss Life Hall, Hannover; Attendance: 4,100; Referees: Metalari, Nikolovski (MKD)
5 May 2026; 18:45	3× (suspension)	Report	1× (yellow card) 4× (suspension) 1× (red card)	Swiss Life Hall, Hannover; Attendance: 4,100; Referees: Metalari, Nikolovski (MKD)

== Final Four ==
The Final Four tournament was held at the Barclays Arena in Hamburg, Germany.

=== Bracket ===
Semi-finals
30 May
(France) Montpellier Handball	28
(Germany) THW Kiel	29
30 May
(Germany) MT Melsungen	37
(Germany) SG Flensburg-Handewitt	30

Final
31 May
(Germany) THW Kiel	23
(Germany) MT Melsungen	24
Third place
31 May
(France) Montpellier Handball	30
(Germany) SG Flensburg-Handewitt	32

=== Semifinals ===
30 May 2026; 12:30	Montpellier Handball (France)	28–29	(Germany) THW Kiel	Barclays Arena, Hamburg; Attendance: 11,023; Referees: Cindric, Gonzurek (CRO)
30 May 2026; 12:30	Balaguer 8	(12−15)	Johansson 6	Barclays Arena, Hamburg; Attendance: 11,023; Referees: Cindric, Gonzurek (CRO)
30 May 2026; 12:30	1× (yellow card)	Report	5× (suspension)	Barclays Arena, Hamburg; Attendance: 11,023; Referees: Cindric, Gonzurek (CRO)

30 May 2026; 15:30	MT Melsungen (Germany)	37–30	(Germany) SG Flensburg-Handewitt	Barclays Arena, Hamburg; Attendance: 11,023; Referees: Bolic, Hurich (AUT)
30 May 2026; 15:30	Krištopāns 9	(15−14)	Pytlick	Barclays Arena, Hamburg; Attendance: 11,023; Referees: Bolic, Hurich (AUT)
30 May 2026; 15:30	1× (suspension) 1× (red card)	Report	3× (suspension)	Barclays Arena, Hamburg; Attendance: 11,023; Referees: Bolic, Hurich (AUT)

=== Third place game ===
31 May 2026; 15:00	Montpellier Handball (France)	30–32	(Germany) SG Flensburg-Handewitt	Barclays Arena, Hamburg; Attendance: 12,200; Referees: Pirvu, Potirniche (ROU)
31 May 2026; 15:00	Srna 6	(16−16)	Pytlick, Jakobsen 7	Barclays Arena, Hamburg; Attendance: 12,200; Referees: Pirvu, Potirniche (ROU)
31 May 2026; 15:00	3× (suspension)	Report	2× (suspension) 1× (red card)	Barclays Arena, Hamburg; Attendance: 12,200; Referees: Pirvu, Potirniche (ROU)

=== Final ===
31 May 2026; 18:00	THW Kiel (Germany)	23–24	(Germany) MT Melsungen	Barclays Arena, Hamburg; Attendance: 12,200; Referees: Marín, García (ESP)
31 May 2026; 18:00	Zerbe 5	(12−13)	Krištopāns 4	Barclays Arena, Hamburg; Attendance: 12,200; Referees: Marín, García (ESP)
31 May 2026; 18:00	2× (yellow card) 4× (suspension)	Report	1× (yellow card) 4× (suspension)	Barclays Arena, Hamburg; Attendance: 12,200; Referees: Marín, García (ESP)

== Top goalscorers ==
Rank	Player	Club	Goals
1	(Sweden) Axel Månsson	(Sweden) IFK Kristianstad	98
2	(Germany) Marko Grgić	(Germany) SG Flensburg-Handewitt	84
3	(Germany) Johannes Golla	(Germany) SG Flensburg-Handewitt	80
4	(Iceland) Óðinn Þór Ríkharðsson	(Switzerland) Kadetten Schaffhausen	74
5	(Denmark) Emil Jakobsen	(Germany) SG Flensburg-Handewitt	72
6	(Norway) Kevin Gulliksen	(Norway) Elverum Håndball	69
7	(Denmark) Simon Pytlick	(Germany) SG Flensburg-Handewitt	67
8	(Croatia) Tin Lučin	(Croatia) RK Nexe	66
9	(Hungary) Péter Lukács	(Norway) Elverum Håndball	65
9	(Slovenia) Jaka Malus	(North Macedonia) HC Vardar 1961	65

== See also ==
- 2025–26 EHF Champions League
- 2025–26 EHF European Cup
- 2025–26 Women's EHF Champions League
- 2025–26 Women's EHF European League
- 2025–26 Women's EHF European Cup
