= Simić =

Simić (Serbian Cyrillic: Симић; pronounced [sǐːmitɕ]) is a Serbo-Croatian surname derived from the male given name Simo, found mainly among ethnic Serbs, but also Croats. It may refer to:

- Aleksa Simić (1800–1872), three-time prime minister
- Blagoje Simić (born 1960), Bosnian Serb war criminal
- Bojan Simić (born 1976), Serbian footballer
- Božin Simić (1881-1966)
- Danijela Simić (born 1969), Serbian rhythmic gymnast
- Đorđe Simić (1843-1921), Serbian politician and diplomat
- Dragoljub Simić (born 1951), former Yugoslav and Bosnian footballer
- Dušan Simić (1938–2023), Serbian-American poet best known as Charles Simic
- Goran Simić (poet), Bosnian poet
- Goran Simić (singer) (1953–2008), Serbian bass
- Igor Simić (born 1986), Kosovar politician
- Jan-Carlo Simić (born 2005), Serbian footballer
- Jelena Simić (born 1992), Bosnian tennis player
- Jovan Simić Bobovac (1775–1831), Serbian prince
- Ljubiša Simić (born 1963), Serbian boxer
- Marko Simić (footballer, born 1987), Montenegrin football defender
- Marko Simić (footballer, born 1993), Serbian football forward
- Milorad Simić (born 1946), Bosnian-born Serbian linguist
- Mima Simić (born 1976), Croatian writer, critic, and activist
- Nikola Simić (actor) (1934–2014), Serbian actor
- Nikola Simić (footballer, born 1897) (1897–1969), Serbian football player, manager and coach of the Yugoslav national
- Nikola Simić (footballer, born 1976), Croatian footballer
- Nikola Simić (footballer, born 1981), Serbian footballer
- Nikola Simić (footballer, born 1996), Serbian football goalkeeper
- Nikola Simić (footballer, born 2007), Serbian footballer
- Nebojša Simić (born 1993), Montenegrin handball player
- Nenad Simić (born 1984), Serbian footballer
- Novica Simić (1948-2012), Bosnian Serb military general
- Radoje Simić (born 1956), Serbian politician
- Saša Simić (born 1969), Serbian footballer and sports agent
- Stanoje Simić (1893-1970), Yugoslav diplomat
- Stefan Simić (born 1995), Czech footballer
- Stefan Simić (basketball) (born 1996), Serbian basketball player
- Tatjana Simić (born 1964), Serbian biologist
- Toni Simić (born 1976), Macedonian basketball player
- Valentina Simić (born 1994), Serbian dancer, hula-hooper, poet and writer - creator of Panda Time
- Vasilije Simić (1866–1931), Serbian lawyer, judge and attorney
- Veljko Simić (born 1995), Serbian footballer
- Vojislav Simić (1924–2025), Serbian musician, conductor, and composer

== See also ==
- Simović
- Šimić
