= 2025–26 EHF European League main round =

The 2025–26 EHF European League main round will be played between 17 February and 10 March 2025 to determine the twelve teams advancing to the knockout stage of the 2025–26 EHF European League.

== Qualified teams ==
Group	Winners	Runners-up
A	(Germany) SG Flensburg-Handewitt	(Spain) Irudek Bidasoa Irún
B	(Germany) THW Kiel	(France) Montpellier Handball
C	(Denmark) SAH - Skanderborg	(Spain) Fraikin BM Granollers
D	(Portugal) FC Porto	(Norway) Elverum Håndball
E	(Germany) MT Melsungen	(Portugal) SL Benfica
F	(North Macedonia) HC Vardar 1961	(Sweden) IFK Kristianstad
G	(Germany) TSV Hannover-Burgdorf	(Denmark) Fredericia HK
H	(Croatia) RK Nexe	(Switzerland) Kadetten Schaffhausen

== Format ==
In each group, teams played against the teams they didn't play in the group stage. Games involving teams who advanced from the same group in the previous round are carried over to the main round.

== Tiebreakers ==
In the group stage, teams were ranked according to points (2 points for a win, 1 point for a draw, 0 points for a loss), and if tied on points, the following tiebreaking criteria were applied, in the order given, to determine the rankings:

1. Points in matches among tied teams;
2. Goal difference in matches among tied teams;
3. Goal difference in all group matches;
4. Goals scored in all group matches;
5. If more than two teams were tied, and after applying all head-to-head criteria above, a subset of teams were still tied, all head-to-head criteria above were reapplied exclusively to this subset of teams;
6. Drawing lots.

== Groups ==
All times are local

=== Group I ===
Pos	Team	Pld	W	D	L	GF	GA	GD	Pts	Qualification	KIE	FLE	MON	BID
1	(Germany) THW Kiel	6	6	0	0	189	157	+32	12	Quarterfinals	—	36–29	27–18	27–20
2	(Germany) SG Flensburg-Handewitt	6	3	0	3	202	205	−3	6 (Note: SG Flensburg-Handewitt 72–70 Montpellier Handball)	Play Offs	30–32	—	40–35	38–35
3	(France) Montpellier Handball	6	3	0	3	190	196	−6	6	Play Offs	28–30	35–32	—	38–33
4	(Spain) Irudek Bidasoa Irún	6	0	0	6	186	209	−23	0		32–37	32–33	34–36	—

Source: EHF
Notes:

17 February 2026; 18:45	SG Flensburg-Handewitt (Germany)	30–32	(Germany) THW Kiel	GP Joule Arena, Flensburg; Attendance: 6,300; Referees: Vesovic, Mitrovic (MNE)
17 February 2026; 18:45	Jakobsen 10	(15–13)	Bilyk, Imre 7	GP Joule Arena, Flensburg; Attendance: 6,300; Referees: Vesovic, Mitrovic (MNE)
17 February 2026; 18:45	3× (suspension)	Report	2× (yellow card) 3× (suspension)	GP Joule Arena, Flensburg; Attendance: 6,300; Referees: Vesovic, Mitrovic (MNE)

17 February 2026; 20:45	Montpellier Handball (France)	38–33	(Spain) Irudek Bidasoa Irún	Sud de France Arena, Montpellier; Attendance: 2,700; Referees: Kinnari, Skogberg (FIN)
17 February 2026; 20:45	Balaguer 10	(17–17)	Mielczarski 7	Sud de France Arena, Montpellier; Attendance: 2,700; Referees: Kinnari, Skogberg (FIN)
17 February 2026; 20:45	1× (suspension)	Report	1× (yellow card) 2× (suspension)	Sud de France Arena, Montpellier; Attendance: 2,700; Referees: Kinnari, Skogberg (FIN)

24 February 2026; 18:45	SG Flensburg-Handewitt (Germany)	40–35	(France) Montpellier Handball	GP Joule Arena, Flensburg; Attendance: 5,600; Referees: Brkic, Jusufhodzic (AUT)
24 February 2026; 18:45	Volz 9	(21–20)	Porte, Plantin 5	GP Joule Arena, Flensburg; Attendance: 5,600; Referees: Brkic, Jusufhodzic (AUT)
24 February 2026; 18:45	2× (suspension)	Report	2× (suspension)	GP Joule Arena, Flensburg; Attendance: 5,600; Referees: Brkic, Jusufhodzic (AUT)

24 February 2026; 20:45	Irudek Bidasoa Irún (Spain)	32–37	(Germany) THW Kiel	Pabellón Polideportivo Artaleku, Irun; Attendance: 1,902; Referees: Altmár, Horváth (HUN)
24 February 2026; 20:45	Mielczarski 7	(15–18)	Imre 7	Pabellón Polideportivo Artaleku, Irun; Attendance: 1,902; Referees: Altmár, Horváth (HUN)
24 February 2026; 20:45	1× (yellow card) 3× (suspension)	Report	2× (suspension)	Pabellón Polideportivo Artaleku, Irun; Attendance: 1,902; Referees: Altmár, Horváth (HUN)

3 March 2026; 18:45	THW Kiel (Germany)	27–20	(Spain) Irudek Bidasoa Irún	Wunderino Arena, Kiel; Attendance: 5,133; Referees: Uhlir, Benus (CZE)
3 March 2026; 18:45	Ankermann, Imre 5	(11–8)	Cavero Echepare, Mielczarski 4	Wunderino Arena, Kiel; Attendance: 5,133; Referees: Uhlir, Benus (CZE)
3 March 2026; 18:45	5× (suspension)	Report	2× (yellow card) 2× (suspension)	Wunderino Arena, Kiel; Attendance: 5,133; Referees: Uhlir, Benus (CZE)

3 March 2026; 20:45	Montpellier Handball (France)	35–32	(Germany) SG Flensburg-Handewitt	Sud de France Arena, Montpellier; Attendance: 7,000; Referees: Cindrić, Gonzurek (CRO)
3 March 2026; 20:45	Thurin, Casado 6	(21–19)	Grgić 9	Sud de France Arena, Montpellier; Attendance: 7,000; Referees: Cindrić, Gonzurek (CRO)
3 March 2026; 20:45	2× (suspension)	Report	4× (suspension)	Sud de France Arena, Montpellier; Attendance: 7,000; Referees: Cindrić, Gonzurek (CRO)

10 March 2026; 20:45	THW Kiel (Germany)	36–29	(Germany) SG Flensburg-Handewitt	Wunderino Arena, Kiel; Attendance: 8,220; Referees: Leszczynski, Piechota (POL)
10 March 2026; 20:45	Imre 8	(18–15)	Grgić, Jakobsen 5	Wunderino Arena, Kiel; Attendance: 8,220; Referees: Leszczynski, Piechota (POL)
10 March 2026; 20:45	1× (yellow card) 1× (suspension)	Report	2× (yellow card) 2× (suspension)	Wunderino Arena, Kiel; Attendance: 8,220; Referees: Leszczynski, Piechota (POL)

10 March 2026; 20:45	Irudek Bidasoa Irún (Spain)	34–36	(France) Montpellier Handball	Pabellón Polideportivo Artaleku, Irun; Attendance: 1,577; Referees: Fremstad, Jørstad (NOR)
10 March 2026; 20:45	Cavero Echepare 8	(18–18)	Simonet 6	Pabellón Polideportivo Artaleku, Irun; Attendance: 1,577; Referees: Fremstad, Jørstad (NOR)
10 March 2026; 20:45	1× (yellow card) 2× (suspension)	Report	4× (suspension)	Pabellón Polideportivo Artaleku, Irun; Attendance: 1,577; Referees: Fremstad, Jørstad (NOR)

=== Group II ===
Pos	Team	Pld	W	D	L	GF	GA	GD	Pts	Qualification	POR	ELV	SAH	GRA
1	(Portugal) FC Porto	6	4	0	2	179	178	+1	8 (Note: FC Porto 58–56 Elverum Håndball)	Quarterfinals	—	29–31	28−33	34−33
2	(Norway) Elverum Håndball	6	4	0	2	178	169	+9	8	Play Offs	25–29	—	31−24	37−28
3	(Denmark) SAH - Skanderborg	6	3	0	3	177	169	+8	6	Play Offs	29−30	32−25	—	28–29
4	(Spain) Fraikin BM Granollers	6	1	0	5	170	188	−18	2		27−29	27−29	26–31	—

Source: EHF
Notes:

17 February 2026; 18:45	Elverum Håndball (Norway)	37–28	(Spain) Fraikin BM Granollers	Terningen Arena, Elverum; Attendance: 1,643; Referees: Leszczynski, Piechota (POL)
17 February 2026; 18:45	Gulliksen 11	(20–10)	three players 5	Terningen Arena, Elverum; Attendance: 1,643; Referees: Leszczynski, Piechota (POL)
17 February 2026; 18:45	2× (suspension)	Report	5× (suspension)	Terningen Arena, Elverum; Attendance: 1,643; Referees: Leszczynski, Piechota (POL)

17 February 2026; 19:45	FC Porto (Portugal)	28–33	(Denmark) SAH - Skanderborg	Pavilhao Dragão Arena, Porto; Attendance: 856; Referees: Cindrić, Gonzurek (CRO)
17 February 2026; 19:45	Costa 9	(17–15)	Lærke, Hansen 8	Pavilhao Dragão Arena, Porto; Attendance: 856; Referees: Cindrić, Gonzurek (CRO)
17 February 2026; 19:45		Report	2× (suspension)	Pavilhao Dragão Arena, Porto; Attendance: 856; Referees: Cindrić, Gonzurek (CRO)

24 February 2026; 18:45	SAH - Skanderborg (Denmark)	32–25	(Norway) Elverum Håndball	Djurslands Bank Arena, Aarhus; Attendance: 1,275; Referees: Antić, Jakovljević (SRB)
24 February 2026; 18:45	Lærke 10	(14–12)	Gulliksen 6	Djurslands Bank Arena, Aarhus; Attendance: 1,275; Referees: Antić, Jakovljević (SRB)
24 February 2026; 18:45	5× (suspension) 1× (red card)	Report	1× (yellow card) 5× (suspension) 1× (red card)	Djurslands Bank Arena, Aarhus; Attendance: 1,275; Referees: Antić, Jakovljević (SRB)

24 February 2026; 20:45	Fraikin BM Granollers (Spain)	27–29	(Portugal) FC Porto	Palau d'Esports de Granollers, Granollers; Attendance: 1,272; Referees: Sniurevicius, Grigalionis (LTU)
24 February 2026; 20:45	Fis 8	(8–12)	Gunnarsson 6	Palau d'Esports de Granollers, Granollers; Attendance: 1,272; Referees: Sniurevicius, Grigalionis (LTU)
24 February 2026; 20:45	1× (yellow card) 2× (suspension)	Report	2× (yellow card) 3× (suspension) 1× (red card)	Palau d'Esports de Granollers, Granollers; Attendance: 1,272; Referees: Sniurevicius, Grigalionis (LTU)

3 March 2026; 18:45	Elverum Håndball (Norway)	31–24	(Denmark) SAH - Skanderborg	Terningen Arena, Elverum; Attendance: 1,539; Referees: Backović, Palačković (SLO)
3 March 2026; 18:45	Lukács, Gulliksen 6	(16–14)	Hansen 9	Terningen Arena, Elverum; Attendance: 1,539; Referees: Backović, Palačković (SLO)
3 March 2026; 18:45	1× (yellow card) 5× (suspension) 1× (red card)	Report	2× (suspension)	Terningen Arena, Elverum; Attendance: 1,539; Referees: Backović, Palačković (SLO)

3 March 2026; 19:45	FC Porto (Portugal)	34–33	(Spain) Fraikin BM Granollers	Pavilhao Dragão Arena, Porto; Attendance: 645; Referees: Stark, Ştefan (ROM)
3 March 2026; 19:45	Gunnarsson 6	(18–16)	Fis 9	Pavilhao Dragão Arena, Porto; Attendance: 645; Referees: Stark, Ştefan (ROM)
3 March 2026; 19:45	5× (suspension) 2× (red card)	Report	1× (suspension)	Pavilhao Dragão Arena, Porto; Attendance: 645; Referees: Stark, Ştefan (ROM)

10 March 2026; 18:45	SAH - Skanderborg (Denmark)	29–30	(Portugal) FC Porto	Terningen Arena, Elverum; Attendance: 1,643; Referees: Schulze, Tönnies (GER)
10 March 2026; 18:45	Olsson 7	(13–13)	Valera 8	Terningen Arena, Elverum; Attendance: 1,643; Referees: Schulze, Tönnies (GER)
10 March 2026; 18:45	1× (yellow card) 1× (suspension)	Report	2× (suspension)	Terningen Arena, Elverum; Attendance: 1,643; Referees: Schulze, Tönnies (GER)

10 March 2026; 18:45	Fraikin BM Granollers (Spain)	27–29	(Norway) Elverum Håndball	Palau d'Esports de Granollers, Granollers; Attendance: 938; Referees: Vesovic, Mitrovic (MNE)
10 March 2026; 18:45	Fis 9	(13–17)	Lukács 7	Palau d'Esports de Granollers, Granollers; Attendance: 938; Referees: Vesovic, Mitrovic (MNE)
10 March 2026; 18:45	1× (yellow card) 4× (suspension) 1× (red card)	Report	5× (suspension)	Palau d'Esports de Granollers, Granollers; Attendance: 938; Referees: Vesovic, Mitrovic (MNE)

=== Group III ===
Pos	Team	Pld	W	D	L	GF	GA	GD	Pts	Qualification	VAR	MEL	KRI	BEN
1	(North Macedonia) HC Vardar 1961	6	4	0	2	205	187	+18	8	Quarterfinals	—	37−33	35–30	33−27
2	(Germany) MT Melsungen	6	3	0	3	179	183	−4	6 (Note: MT Melsungen 63–60 IFK Kristianstad)	Play Offs	25−34	—	33−29	28–26
3	(Sweden) IFK Kristianstad	6	3	0	3	186	189	−3	6	Play Offs	32–31	31–30	—	34−38
4	(Portugal) SL Benfica	6	2	0	4	179	190	−11	4		40−35	26–30	22−30	—

Source: EHF
Notes:

17 February 2026; 19:45	SL Benfica (Portugal)	40–35	(North Macedonia) HC Vardar 1961	Pavilhão da Luz Nᵒ 2, Lisbon; Attendance: 813; Referees: Horváth, Marton (HUN)
17 February 2026; 19:45	Vailupau 7	(24–16)	Horiha 9	Pavilhão da Luz Nᵒ 2, Lisbon; Attendance: 813; Referees: Horváth, Marton (HUN)
17 February 2026; 19:45	2× (suspension)	Report	2× (yellow card) 6× (suspension) 1× (red card)	Pavilhão da Luz Nᵒ 2, Lisbon; Attendance: 813; Referees: Horváth, Marton (HUN)

17 February 2026; 20:45	MT Melsungen (Germany)	33–29	(Sweden) IFK Kristianstad	Rothenbach-Halle, Kassel; Attendance: 1,650; Referees: Mandák, Rudinský (SVK)
17 February 2026; 20:45	Stefánsson 7	(17–18)	Månsson 6	Rothenbach-Halle, Kassel; Attendance: 1,650; Referees: Mandák, Rudinský (SVK)
17 February 2026; 20:45	2× (suspension)	Report	2× (suspension)	Rothenbach-Halle, Kassel; Attendance: 1,650; Referees: Mandák, Rudinský (SVK)

24 February 2026; 18:45	IFK Kristianstad (Sweden)	34–38	(Portugal) SL Benfica	Kristianstad Arena, Kristianstad; Attendance: 2,203; Referees: Lončar, Lončar (CRO)
24 February 2026; 18:45	Höghielm 10	(18–19)	Soriano, Silva 7	Kristianstad Arena, Kristianstad; Attendance: 2,203; Referees: Lončar, Lončar (CRO)
24 February 2026; 18:45	4× (suspension)	Report	1× (suspension)	Kristianstad Arena, Kristianstad; Attendance: 2,203; Referees: Lončar, Lončar (CRO)

24 February 2026; 20:45	HC Vardar 1961 (North Macedonia)	37–33	(Germany) MT Melsungen	Jane Sandanski Arena, Skopje; Attendance: 4,000; Referees: Pirvu, Potirniche (ROU)
24 February 2026; 20:45	Malus 10	(18–19)	Stefánsson 12	Jane Sandanski Arena, Skopje; Attendance: 4,000; Referees: Pirvu, Potirniche (ROU)
24 February 2026; 20:45	2× (suspension)	Report	4× (suspension)	Jane Sandanski Arena, Skopje; Attendance: 4,000; Referees: Pirvu, Potirniche (ROU)

3 March 2026; 18:45	IFK Kristianstad (Sweden)	31–30	(Germany) MT Melsungen	Kristianstad Arena, Kristianstad; Attendance: 2,205; Referees: Borge, Nygren (NOR)
3 March 2026; 18:45	Månsson 15	(16–16)	Drosten 6	Kristianstad Arena, Kristianstad; Attendance: 2,205; Referees: Borge, Nygren (NOR)
3 March 2026; 18:45	1× (yellow card) 3× (suspension)	Report	4× (suspension)	Kristianstad Arena, Kristianstad; Attendance: 2,205; Referees: Borge, Nygren (NOR)

3 March 2026; 20:45	HC Vardar 1961 (North Macedonia)	33–27	(Portugal) SL Benfica	Jane Sandanski Arena, Skopje; Attendance: 4,400; Referees: Pagh, Thygesen (DEN)
3 March 2026; 20:45	Malus 9	(15–14)	Moreira, Silva 5	Jane Sandanski Arena, Skopje; Attendance: 4,400; Referees: Pagh, Thygesen (DEN)
3 March 2026; 20:45	3× (suspension)	Report	2× (suspension)	Jane Sandanski Arena, Skopje; Attendance: 4,400; Referees: Pagh, Thygesen (DEN)

10 March 2026; 19:45	SL Benfica (Portugal)	22–30	(Sweden) IFK Kristianstad	Pavilhão da Luz Nᵒ 2, Lisbon; Attendance: 407; Referees: Prastalo, Balvan (BIH)
10 March 2026; 19:45	Soriano 6	(15–14)	Månsson 7	Pavilhão da Luz Nᵒ 2, Lisbon; Attendance: 407; Referees: Prastalo, Balvan (BIH)
10 March 2026; 19:45	5× (suspension)	Report	1× (yellow card) 4× (suspension) 2× (red card)	Pavilhão da Luz Nᵒ 2, Lisbon; Attendance: 407; Referees: Prastalo, Balvan (BIH)

10 March 2026; 20:45	MT Melsungen (Germany)	25–34	(North Macedonia) HC Vardar 1961	Rothenbach-Halle, Kassel; Attendance: 2,129; Referees: Oyarzun, Zaragueta (ESP)
10 March 2026; 20:45	Drosten 6	(12–17)	Pedro Silva 6	Rothenbach-Halle, Kassel; Attendance: 2,129; Referees: Oyarzun, Zaragueta (ESP)
10 March 2026; 20:45	1× (suspension)	Report	4× (suspension)	Rothenbach-Halle, Kassel; Attendance: 2,129; Referees: Oyarzun, Zaragueta (ESP)

=== Group IV ===
Pos	Team	Pld	W	D	L	GF	GA	GD	Pts	Qualification	HAN	NEX	FRE	KAD
1	(Germany) TSV Hannover-Burgdorf	6	4	0	2	186	168	+18	8	Quarterfinals	—	34−28	31–34	31−27
2	(Croatia) RK Nexe	6	3	0	3	181	178	+3	6 (Note: RK Nexe 66–60 Fredericia HK)	Play Offs	26−23	—	33−34	29–30
3	(Denmark) Fredericia HK	6	3	0	3	183	189	−6	6	Play Offs	29–31	26−33	—	30−32
4	(Switzerland) Kadetten Schaffhausen	6	2	0	4	173	188	−15	4		24−36	31–32	29−30	—

Source: EHF
Notes:

17 February 2026; 18:45	Fredericia HK (Denmark)	30–32	(Switzerland) Kadetten Schaffhausen	Middelfart Sparekasse Arena, Fredericia; Attendance: 1,115; Referees: Jovic, Arnautovic (BIH)
17 February 2026; 18:45	Martinusen 6	(12–15)	Ríkharðsson, Maros 9	Middelfart Sparekasse Arena, Fredericia; Attendance: 1,115; Referees: Jovic, Arnautovic (BIH)
17 February 2026; 18:45	2× (yellow card) 2× (suspension)	Report	3× (suspension)	Middelfart Sparekasse Arena, Fredericia; Attendance: 1,115; Referees: Jovic, Arnautovic (BIH)

17 February 2026; 20:45	TSV Hannover-Burgdorf (Germany)	34–28	(Croatia) RK Nexe	Swiss Life Hall, Hannover; Attendance: 2,302; Referees: Fremstad, Jørstad (NOR)
17 February 2026; 20:45	Fischer 9	(18–11)	Krupić 5	Swiss Life Hall, Hannover; Attendance: 2,302; Referees: Fremstad, Jørstad (NOR)
17 February 2026; 20:45	2× (suspension)	Report	4× (suspension)	Swiss Life Hall, Hannover; Attendance: 2,302; Referees: Fremstad, Jørstad (NOR)

24 February 2026; 18:45	Kadetten Schaffhausen (Switzerland)	24–36	(Germany) TSV Hannover-Burgdorf	BBC-Arena, Schaffhausen; Attendance: 2,458; Referees: Cernavskis, Bogdanovs (LAT)
24 February 2026; 18:45	Ríkharðsson 8	(13–15)	Pedersen 7	BBC-Arena, Schaffhausen; Attendance: 2,458; Referees: Cernavskis, Bogdanovs (LAT)
24 February 2026; 18:45	1× (yellow card) 3× (suspension)	Report	3× (suspension)	BBC-Arena, Schaffhausen; Attendance: 2,458; Referees: Cernavskis, Bogdanovs (LAT)

24 February 2026; 20:45	RK Nexe (Croatia)	33–34	(Denmark) Fredericia HK	OS Kralja Tomislava, Našice; Attendance: 2,000; Referees: Novykov (UKR), Gatelis (LTU)
24 February 2026; 20:45	Lučin 10	(15–19)	Andersen, Bisgaard 5	OS Kralja Tomislava, Našice; Attendance: 2,000; Referees: Novykov (UKR), Gatelis (LTU)
24 February 2026; 20:45	3× (suspension)	Report	1× (yellow card) 4× (suspension)	OS Kralja Tomislava, Našice; Attendance: 2,000; Referees: Novykov (UKR), Gatelis (LTU)

3 March 2026; 20:45	TSV Hannover-Burgdorf (Germany)	31–27	(Switzerland) Kadetten Schaffhausen	Swiss Life Hall, Hannover; Attendance: 2,503; Referees: Mandak, Rudinsky (SVK)
3 March 2026; 20:45	Pedersen 9	(15–15)	Ríkharðsson 9	Swiss Life Hall, Hannover; Attendance: 2,503; Referees: Mandak, Rudinsky (SVK)
3 March 2026; 20:45	3× (suspension)	Report	1× (yellow card) 5× (suspension)	Swiss Life Hall, Hannover; Attendance: 2,503; Referees: Mandak, Rudinsky (SVK)

3 March 2026; 20:45	Fredericia HK (Denmark)	26–33	(Croatia) RK Nexe	Middelfart Sparekasse Arena, Fredericia; Attendance: 1,285; Referees: Horváth, Marton (HUN)
3 March 2026; 20:45	Mossestad 6	(26–33)	Moslavac, Barbić 8	Middelfart Sparekasse Arena, Fredericia; Attendance: 1,285; Referees: Horváth, Marton (HUN)
3 March 2026; 20:45	3× (suspension)	Report	3× (suspension)	Middelfart Sparekasse Arena, Fredericia; Attendance: 1,285; Referees: Horváth, Marton (HUN)

10 March 2026; 18:45	RK Nexe (Croatia)	26–23	(Germany) TSV Hannover-Burgdorf	OS Kralja Tomislava, Našice; Attendance: 2,000; Referees: Puksic, Satler (SLO)
10 March 2026; 18:45	Barbić 9	(14–9)	Poulsen 5	OS Kralja Tomislava, Našice; Attendance: 2,000; Referees: Puksic, Satler (SLO)
10 March 2026; 18:45	1× (yellow card) 1× (suspension)	Report	2× (suspension)	OS Kralja Tomislava, Našice; Attendance: 2,000; Referees: Puksic, Satler (SLO)

10 March 2026; 18:45	Kadetten Schaffhausen (Switzerland)	29–30	(Denmark) Fredericia HK	BBC-Arena, Schaffhausen; Attendance: 1,256; Referees: Antic, Jakovljevic (SRB)
10 March 2026; 18:45	Ríkharðsson 8	(13–14)	Martinusen 10	BBC-Arena, Schaffhausen; Attendance: 1,256; Referees: Antic, Jakovljevic (SRB)
10 March 2026; 18:45	5× (suspension)	Report	5× (suspension) 1× (red card)	BBC-Arena, Schaffhausen; Attendance: 1,256; Referees: Antic, Jakovljevic (SRB)
