= Simor =

Simor is a surname. Notable people with the surname include:

- Ágnes Simor (born 1979), Hungarian actress and dancer
- András Simor (born 1954), Hungarian economist
- Erzsi Simor (1913–1977), Hungarian actress
- János Simor (1813–1891), Hungarian Catholic cardinal

== See also ==
- Simo (surname)
