= Simonovic =

Simonovic may refer to:

- Simonović (pronounced [simoːnoʋitɕ]), a Serbian surname
- Šimonović (pronounced [ʃimoːnoʋitɕ]), a Croatian surname
