= Simo =

Simo or SIMO may refer to:

== People ==
- Simo (given name), a given name
- Simo (surname), a surname
- Simone "Simo" Teti, of Paris & Simo
- Simo (footballer) (Wassim Keddari Boulif), Spanish footballer nicknamed Simo

== Other uses ==
- SIMO (band), an American rock band formed in 2010
- Simo (society), a secret society in West Africa
- Simo (weevil), a beetle genus in the tribe Peritelini
- Simo, Finland, a municipality of Finland
- SIMO TCI (Salón Internacional de Mobiliario de Oficina / Tecnologías de la Comunicación e Información), an annual computer trade fair held in Spain from 1961 to 2013.
- Simo (Single input, multiple outputs), a characterization of control systems in system analysis
- Silicon Motion, a semiconductor and solid-state drive manufacturer traded as SIMO

== See also ==
- Simon (given name)
- Samo (disambiguation)
