= Simunovic =

Simunovic may refer to:

- Simunović (pronounced [simǔːnoʋitɕ]), a Serbian surname
- Šimunović (pronounced [ʃimǔːnoʋitɕ]), a Croatian surname
