= Simic =

Simic may refer to:

- Simić, a Serbian and Croatian surname
- Šimić, a Croatian and Serbian surname
- Šimic, a Slovene surname
- Simic Combine, a Magic: The Gathering faction from Ravnica
- Simics, a software simulator
- Simics (surname), a Hungarian surname
