= Šimun =

Šimun is a Croatian male given name, equivalent to Simon. It is also a family name in Croatia and Slovakia. Notable people with the name include:

== Given name ==
- Šimun Kožičić Benja (c. 1460 – 1536), Croatian nobleman
- Šimun Katalinić (1889–1977), Croatian rower
- Šimun Milinović (1835–1910), Croatian Roman Catholic priest
- Šimun Debelić (1902–1945), Croatian veterinarian
- Šimun de Michieli-Vitturi, Dalmatian politician

== Surname ==
- Eduard Šimun, Slovak ice hockey player
- Nenad Šimun, known as Target (rapper), Croatian rapper

== See also ==
- Simun (disambiguation)
- Šime
- Šimunić
- Šimunović
