= Simunic =

Simunic may refer to:

- Šimunić, a Croatian surname
- Simunić, a Croatian surname
