= Mfayela =

Mfayela is a surname, occurring in South Africa. Notable people with the surname include:

- Senzo Mfayela (1961–2025), South African politician and businessman
- Simo Mfayela (died 2020), South African politician from KwaZulu-Natal
