= Simo (given name) =

Simo (Serbian Cyrillic: Симо) is a masculine given name cognate to Simon. It is found primarily in Finnish and Serbian. It is also a diminutive for Mohamed in Morocco. Notable people named Simo include:

- Simo Aalto (born 1960), Finnish stage magician
- Simo Boltić (born 1994), Serbian sprint canoer
- Simo Elaković (1940–2016), Serbian philosopher and professor
- Simo Frangén (born 1963), Finnish TV presenter
- Simó de Guardiola y Hortoneda, Bishop of Urgel and ex officio Co-Prince of Andorra from 1827 to 1851
- Simo Halonen, Finnish biathlete in the 1970s
- Simo Häyhä (1905–2002), Finnish sniper in the Winter War, credited with the most confirmed kills in a major war
- Simo Krunić (born 1967), Serbian football manager and former player
- Simo Kuzmanović (born 1986), Bosnian Serb footballer
- Simo Lampinen (born 1943), Finnish former rally driver
- Simo Mälkiä (born 1983), Finnish retired ice hockey defenceman
- Simo Matavulj (1852–1908), Serbian novelist
- Simo Mfayela (died 2020), South African politician from KwaZulu-Natal
- Simo Nikolić (footballer) (born 1954), Yugoslav former footballer
- Simo Nikolić (sailor) (1941–2012), Croatian sailor
- Simo Nurminen (born 1949), Finnish orienteering competitor
- Simo Paavilainen (born 1944), Finnish architect and former dean and professor
- Simo Parpola (born 1943), Finnish archaeologist and professor
- Simo Puupponen (1915-1967), Finnish writer and novelist better known by the pen name Aapeli
- Simo Rundgren (born 1953), Finnish politician
- Simo Salminen (1932–2015), Finnish comic and actor
- Simo Saarinen (born 1963), Finnish retired ice hockey defenceman
- Simo Syrjävaara (born 1943), Finish retired footballer and manager
- Simo Valakari (born 1973), Finnish football manager and retired player
- Simo Vuorilehto (born 1930), Finnish businessman, former chairman and CEO of Nokia Corporation

== See also ==
- Simo (disambiguation)
- Simović
