= Goran Simić =

Goran Simić may refer to:

- Goran Simić (poet) (1952-2024), Bosnian poet
- Goran Simić (singer) (1953–2008), Serbian bass
