= Simeunović =

Simeunović (Serbian Cyrillic: Симеуновић) is a Serbian surname, a patronymic derived from Simeun (English: Simon). It may refer to:

- Đorđe Simeunović (born 1995), Serbian basketball player
- Dragan Simeunović (1954–2025), Yugoslav football goalkeeper
- Marko Simeunović (born 1967), Slovenian-Serbian former football goalkeeper
- Milan Simeunović (born 1967), Serbian former football goalkeeper
- Nemanja Simeunović (born 1984), Serbian footballer
- Vojislav Simeunović (born 1942), Serbian football coach and former player

== See also ==
- Simeonović
- Simonović
