= Šimić =

Šimić (pronounced [ʃǐːmitɕ]) is a surname found mainly among the Croats, but sometimes also among the Serbs.

Notable people with the name include:

- Ana Šimić (born 1990), Croatian athlete
- Andrijica Šimić (1833–1905), Croatian folk hero
- Antun Branko Šimić (1898–1925), Bosnian Croat poet
- Charles Simic (1938-2023), Serbian-born American poet
- Dario Šimić (born 1975), Croatian footballer
- Dušan Šimić (born 1980), Serbian-Slovenian footballer
- Franjo Šimić (1900–1944), Croatian general
- Josip Šimić (born 1977), Croatian footballer, brother of Dario
- Lorenco Šimić (born 1996), Croatian footballer
- Mario Šimić (born 1989), Croatian footballer
- Marko Šimić (skier), Slovenian Nordic combined skier born 1982
- Marko Šimić (footballer, born 1985), Croatian football goalkeeper
- Marko Šimić (footballer, born 1988), Croatian football striker
- Matej Šimić (born 1995), Croatian footballer
- Nikola Šimić (1766–1848), Serbian logician
- Noa-Gabriel Šimić (born 2004), Croatian footballer
- Petar Šimić (1932–1990), Croatian Yugoslav admiral
- Predrag Šimić (born 1979), Bosnian-Herzegovinian footballer
- Roko Šimić (born 2003), Croatian footballer
- Tatjana Šimić (born 1963), Dutch-Croatian model and actress
- Zdravko Šimić (born 1977), Croatian footballer

== See also ==
- Šime
- Simić
