= Samo (disambiguation) =

Samo (died 658) was a Slavic king.

Samo may also refer to:

== Music ==
- Samo (singer) (born 1975), Mexican singer
- Samo (Stoja album), 2000
- Samo (Nina Kraljić album), 2016

== Places ==
- Samo, Calabria, Italy, a small town and commune
- Santa Monica, California, a nickname for the city
- 20969 Samo, an asteroid - see List of minor planets: 20001–21000

== People ==
- Samo (given name), a list of people
- Ravuama Samo (born 1979), Fijian rugby union player
- Radike Samo (born 1976), Fijian-Australian rugby union player
- Samo (singer) (born 1975), Mexican singer

== Other uses ==
- Samo seed (Echinochloa frumentacea)
- SAMO, an abbreviation for superatomic molecular orbital
- SAMO, a graffiti tag created by the artist Jean-Michel Basquiat and Al Diaz
- Samo people, a sub-ethnic group of the Mandinka people from West Africa
- Samo language (Burkina)
- Samo language (New Guinea)

== See also ==
- Sam'O, reggae singer
- Sammo Hung (born 1952), Hong Kong actor, martial artist, film producer and director
- Samos (disambiguation)
