= Simun =

Simun and variants may refer to:

== Places ==
- Simun, Burma
- Simun, Iran

== People ==
- Šimun, a given name in Croatia and a surname in Croatia and Slovakia
- Símun (fl. 1350), head of state of the Faroe Islands
- Símun Mikkjal Zachariasen (1853–1931), Faroese teacher and social activist
- Símun Petur Zachariasen (1887-1977), Faroese teacher, editor, and politician
- Símun av Skarði (1872-1942), Faroese poet, politician and teacher
- Jóan Símun Edmundsson (born 1991), Faroese professional footballer
