= Šime =

Šime (pronounced [ʃǐːme]) is a masculine Croatian given name commonly found in Dalmatia. Notable people with the name include:

- Šime Budinić (1535–1600), a 16th-century Catholic priest and writer from Zadar, Venetian Dalmatia (today Croatia)
- Šime Ljubić (1822–1896), Croatian historian
- Šime Đodan (1927–2007), Croatian politician and economist
- Šime Luketin (born 1953), Croatian footballer
- Šime Vrsaljko (born 1992), Croatian footballer

== See also ==
- Šimun, of which Šime can be a diminutive form
- Šimić
