= Šimunović =

Šimunović (pronounced [ʃimǔːnoʋitɕ]) is a South Slavic surname, a patronymic of Šimun. Notable people with the surname include:

- Dinko Šimunović (1873–1933), Croatian writer
- Jozo Šimunović (born 1994), Bosnian-Croatian footballer
- Luka Šimunović (born 1997), Croatian footballer
- Mario Simunovic (born 1989), Swedish footballer of Croatian descent
- Mato Šimunović (born 1985), Austrian footballer of Bosnian origin
- Petar Šimunović (1933–2014), Croatian linguist
- Pjer Šimunović, (born 1962), Croatian diplomat
- Renato Šimunović (born 1994), German rapper of Bosnian Croat descent

== See also ==
- Simunović
- Šimonović
