= 2025–26 EHF European League qualification round =

Handball tournament qualifier

EHF European League qualification round
- 2025–26

Tournament information
- Sport: Handball
- Date: 30 August – 7 September 2025
- Teams: 24 (from 17 countries)

Tournament statistics
- Matches played: 24

The 2025–26 EHF European League qualification round decided the last twelve qualifiers for the European League group stage.

== Format ==
Twenty four teams were split into twelve play offs. While twenty teams took part in the normal play offs, two clubs were pre-seeded to play against each other in a special play off. The winners of the special play off would reach the group stage but unlike the other teams who are immediately eliminated, the special play off loser drop downs to the 2025–26 EHF European Cup. The play offs were held in a home and away format. Whoever has the highest score on aggregate won the tie and secured a place in the group stage.

== Teams ==
Location of teams of the 2025–26 EHF European League qualification round.

Teams
(Croatia) MRK Sesvete	(Croatia) MRK Čakovec
(Croatia) MRK Dugo Selo	(Czech Republic) HCB Karviná
(Denmark) Mors-Thy Håndbold	(Denmark) SAH - Skanderborg
(France) Saint-Raphael Var Handball	(Germany) TSV Hannover-Burgdorf
(Iceland) Stjarnan	(Norway) Elverum Håndball
(North Macedonia) HC Alkaloid	(Poland) KGHM Chrobry Głogów
(Portugal) Maritimo da Madeira Andebol SAD	(Portugal) ABC de Braga Lusíadas Saúde
(Romania) CS Minaur Baia Mare	(Serbia) RK Partizan
(Slovenia) RK Gorenje Velenje	(Spain) Bathco BM Torrelavega
(Spain) Irudek Bidasoa Irún	(Sweden) HK Malmö
(Sweden) HF Karlskrona	(Sweden) IK Sävehof
(Switzerland) BSV Bern	(Switzerland) HC Kriens-Luzern

Location of teams in 2025–26 EHF European League qualification round (Madeira)

== Draw ==
External videos
- Draw

The draw for the qualification round was conducted on 15 July 2025 in Vienna, Austria. The bold text means which teams advanced.

Seeding
Seeded	Unseeded
(Germany) **TSV Hannover-Burgdorf** (Portugal) Maritimo da Madeira Andebol SAD (Spain) Bathco BM Torrelavega (Denmark) Mors-Thy Håndbold (Switzerland) **BSV Bern** (Sweden) HK Malmö (Croatia) **MRK Sesvete** (Iceland) Stjarnan (Poland) KGHM Chrobry Głogów (Slovenia) RK Gorenje Velenje (Portugal) ABC de Braga Lusíadas Saúde	(Switzerland) **HC Kriens-Luzern** (Sweden) **HF Karlskrona** (Croatia) MRK Dugo Selo (France) **Saint-Raphael Var Handball** (Denmark) **SAH - Skanderborg** (Spain) **Irudek Bidasoa Irún** (Croatia) MRK Čakovec (Sweden) **IK Sävehof** (Romania) **CS Minaur Baia Mare** (North Macedonia) HC Alkaloid (Norway) **Elverum Håndball**

== Summary ==
The eleven winners on aggregate advanced to the group stage. The first legs will be held on 30 to 31 August 2025 while the second legs will be held on 6–7 September 2025.

Team 1	Agg.	Team 2	1st leg	2nd leg
**TSV Hannover-Burgdorf** (Germany)	66–55	(North Macedonia) HC Alkaloid	37–27	29–28
Mors-Thy Håndbold (Denmark)	64–80	(France) **Saint-Raphael Var Handball**	32–45	32–35
RK Gorenje Velenje (Slovenia)	50–59	(Switzerland) **HC Kriens-Luzern**	25–27	25–32
**Irudek Bidasoa Irún** (Spain)	65–50	(Portugal) ABC de Braga Lusíadas Saúde	35–26	30–24
KGHM Chrobry Głogów (Poland)	65–70	(Sweden) **HF Karlskrona**	30–33	35–37
**CS Minaur Baia Mare** (Romania)	53–52	(Iceland) Stjarnan	26–26	27–26
HK Malmö (Sweden)	60–71	(Sweden) **IK Sävehof**	24–33	36–38
MRK Dugo Selo (Croatia)	56–64	(Croatia) **MRK Sesvete**	32–29	24–35
**Elverum Håndball** (Norway)	67–56	(Spain) Bathco BM Torrelavega	38–28	29–28
MRK Čakovec (Croatia)	55–73	(Switzerland) **BSV Bern**	28–31	27–42
**SAH - Skanderborg** (Denmark)	74–56	(Portugal) Maritimo da Madeira Andebol SAD	38–25	36–31

=== Matches ===
31 August 2025; 17:00	**TSV Hannover-Burgdorf (Germany)**	**37–27**	**(North Macedonia) HC Alkaloid**	Swiss Life Hall, Hannover; Attendance: 2,907; Referees: Ruben Maia, André Nunes (POR)
31 August 2025; 17:00	Steinhauser 11	(19–15)	Þordarsson 10	Swiss Life Hall, Hannover; Attendance: 2,907; Referees: Ruben Maia, André Nunes (POR)
31 August 2025; 17:00	1× (yellow card) 6× (suspension)	Report	1× (yellow card) 5× (suspension) 1× (red card)	Swiss Life Hall, Hannover; Attendance: 2,907; Referees: Ruben Maia, André Nunes (POR)

6 September 2025; 17:00	**HC Alkaloid (North Macedonia)**	**28–29**	**(Germany) TSV Hannover-Burgdorf**	Sportska Sala Avtokomanda, Skopje; Attendance: 950; Referees: Mihai Pîrvu, Radu Potîrniche (ROU)
6 September 2025; 17:00	Þordarsson 8	(14–14)	Fischer 8	Sportska Sala Avtokomanda, Skopje; Attendance: 950; Referees: Mihai Pîrvu, Radu Potîrniche (ROU)
6 September 2025; 17:00	2× (suspension)	Report	6× (suspension)	Sportska Sala Avtokomanda, Skopje; Attendance: 950; Referees: Mihai Pîrvu, Radu Potîrniche (ROU)

TSV Hannover-Burgdorf won 66–55 on aggregate

30 August 2025; 16:00	**Mors-Thy Håndbold (Denmark)**	**32–45**	**(France) Saint-Raphaël Var Handball**	Thy Hallerne, Thisted; Attendance: 935; Referees: Sami Kinnari, Johan Skogberg (FIN)
30 August 2025; 16:00	Norlyk, Sunesen 6	(15–23)	Marescot 7	Thy Hallerne, Thisted; Attendance: 935; Referees: Sami Kinnari, Johan Skogberg (FIN)
30 August 2025; 16:00	1× (yellow card) 4× (suspension) 1× (red card)	Report	3× (suspension)	Thy Hallerne, Thisted; Attendance: 935; Referees: Sami Kinnari, Johan Skogberg (FIN)

6 September 2025; 20:30	**Saint-Raphaël Var Handball (France)**	**35–32**	**(Denmark) Mors-Thy Håndbold**	Palais des Sports JF Krakowski , Saint-Raphaël; Attendance: 1,350; Referees: Miljan Vešović, Novica Mitrović (MNE)
6 September 2025; 20:30	Leyvigne 6	(19–13)	Hald 6	Palais des Sports JF Krakowski , Saint-Raphaël; Attendance: 1,350; Referees: Miljan Vešović, Novica Mitrović (MNE)
6 September 2025; 20:30	1× (yellow card) 5× (suspension) 1× (red card)	Report	1× (yellow card) 5× (suspension)	Palais des Sports JF Krakowski , Saint-Raphaël; Attendance: 1,350; Referees: Miljan Vešović, Novica Mitrović (MNE)

Saint-Raphaël Var Handball won 80–64 on aggregate

30 August 2025; 18:00	**RK Gorenje Velenje (Slovenia)**	**25–27**	**(Switzerland) HC Kriens-Luzern**	Red Hall, Velenje; Attendance: 700; Referees: Ioannis Fotakidis, Charalampos Kinatzidis (GRE)
30 August 2025; 18:00	Velić 10	(8–12)	Sigrist 7	Red Hall, Velenje; Attendance: 700; Referees: Ioannis Fotakidis, Charalampos Kinatzidis (GRE)
30 August 2025; 18:00	1× (yellow card) 2× (suspension)	Report	3× (suspension)	Red Hall, Velenje; Attendance: 700; Referees: Ioannis Fotakidis, Charalampos Kinatzidis (GRE)

6 September 2025; 18:00	**HC Kriens-Luzern (Switzerland)**	**32–25**	**(Slovenia) RK Gorenje Velenje**	Sursee Stadthalle, Sursee; Attendance: 1,050; Referees: Ron Peretz, Niv Schwartz (ISR)
6 September 2025; 18:00	Sigrist, Čepić 7	(18–12)	Velić 8	Sursee Stadthalle, Sursee; Attendance: 1,050; Referees: Ron Peretz, Niv Schwartz (ISR)
6 September 2025; 18:00	3× (suspension)	Report	1× (suspension)	Sursee Stadthalle, Sursee; Attendance: 1,050; Referees: Ron Peretz, Niv Schwartz (ISR)

HC Kriens-Luzern won 59–50 on aggregate

30 August 2025; 18:30	**Irudek Bidasoa Irún (Spain)**	**35–26**	**(Portugal) ABC de Braga Lusíadas Saúde**	Pabellón Polideportivo Artaleku, Irun; Attendance: 1,328; Referees: Danielo Bozhinovski, Viktor Nachevski (MKD)
30 August 2025; 18:30	Múgica 6	(16–11)	Meireles 9	Pabellón Polideportivo Artaleku, Irun; Attendance: 1,328; Referees: Danielo Bozhinovski, Viktor Nachevski (MKD)
30 August 2025; 18:30	6× (suspension)	Report	6× (suspension)	Pabellón Polideportivo Artaleku, Irun; Attendance: 1,328; Referees: Danielo Bozhinovski, Viktor Nachevski (MKD)

6 September 2025; 17:00	**ABC de Braga Lusíadas Saúde (Portugal)**	**24–30**	**(Spain) Irudek Bidasoa Irún**	Pavilhão Flávio Sá Leite, Braga; Attendance: 250; Referees: Marion Kull, Alvar Tint (EST)
6 September 2025; 17:00	Pando 6	(10–14)	Salinas 5	Pavilhão Flávio Sá Leite, Braga; Attendance: 250; Referees: Marion Kull, Alvar Tint (EST)
6 September 2025; 17:00	1× (yellow card) 2× (suspension) 1× (red card)	Report	1× (yellow card) 2× (suspension)	Pavilhão Flávio Sá Leite, Braga; Attendance: 250; Referees: Marion Kull, Alvar Tint (EST)

Bidasoa Irún won 65–50 on aggregate

30 August 2025; 18:00	**KGHM Chrobry Głogów (Poland)**	**30–33**	**(Sweden) HF Karlskrona**	Sportowi Hala Ryszarda Matuszaka, Głogów; Attendance: 802; Referees: Aleksandar Jović, Nedim Arnautović (BIH)
30 August 2025; 18:00	Żyszkiewicz 6	(12–16)	Larsson 8	Sportowi Hala Ryszarda Matuszaka, Głogów; Attendance: 802; Referees: Aleksandar Jović, Nedim Arnautović (BIH)
30 August 2025; 18:00	1× (yellow card) 3× (suspension)	Report	5× (suspension)	Sportowi Hala Ryszarda Matuszaka, Głogów; Attendance: 802; Referees: Aleksandar Jović, Nedim Arnautović (BIH)

6 September 2025; 18:00	**HF Karlskrona (Sweden)**	**37–35**	**(Poland) KGHM Chrobry Głogów**	Brinova Arena Karlskrona, Karlskrona; Attendance: 1,625; Referees: Bogdan Nicolae Stark, Romeo Mihai Ştefan (ROU)
6 September 2025; 18:00	Mikkelsen 11	(18–14)	Adamski 6	Brinova Arena Karlskrona, Karlskrona; Attendance: 1,625; Referees: Bogdan Nicolae Stark, Romeo Mihai Ştefan (ROU)
6 September 2025; 18:00	5× (suspension)	Report	5× (suspension)	Brinova Arena Karlskrona, Karlskrona; Attendance: 1,625; Referees: Bogdan Nicolae Stark, Romeo Mihai Ştefan (ROU)

HF Karlskrona won 70–65 on aggregate

30 August 2025; 18:00	**CS Minaur Baia Mare (Romania)**	**26–26**	**(Iceland) Stjarnan**	Sala Sporturilor Lascăr Pană, Baia Mare; Attendance: 1,450; Referees: Tatjana Praštalo, Vesna Balvan (BIH)
30 August 2025; 18:00	Botea, Pop 5	(15–14)	Gunnarsson 5	Sala Sporturilor Lascăr Pană, Baia Mare; Attendance: 1,450; Referees: Tatjana Praštalo, Vesna Balvan (BIH)
30 August 2025; 18:00	1× (yellow card) 1× (suspension) 1× (red card)	Report	2× (yellow card) 7× (suspension)	Sala Sporturilor Lascăr Pană, Baia Mare; Attendance: 1,450; Referees: Tatjana Praštalo, Vesna Balvan (BIH)

6 September 2025
15:00
Stjarnan (Iceland)
**26–27**
(Romania) CS Minaur Baia Mare
Heklu Höllin, Garðabær
Attendance: 750
Referees: Titouan Picard, Pierre Vauchez (FRA)
Gunnarsson 7
(13–14)
three players 5
2× (suspension)
Report
1× (yellow card) 4× (suspension) 1× (red card)

FT: 23–23 Pen: 3–4

CS Minaur Baia Mare won 53–52 on aggregate after penalty shootout

31 August 2025; 16:15	**HK Malmö (Sweden)**	**24–33**	**(Sweden) IK Sävehof**	Baltiska Hallen, Malmö; Attendance: 788; Referees: Svavar Pétursson, Sigurður Þrastarson (ISL)
31 August 2025; 16:15	Roganovic 7	(14–18)	Durlanu 8	Baltiska Hallen, Malmö; Attendance: 788; Referees: Svavar Pétursson, Sigurður Þrastarson (ISL)
31 August 2025; 16:15	1× (suspension)	Report	5× (suspension)	Baltiska Hallen, Malmö; Attendance: 788; Referees: Svavar Pétursson, Sigurður Þrastarson (ISL)

6 September 2025; 16:15	**IK Sävehof (Sweden)**	**38–36**	**(Sweden) HK Malmö**	Partille Arena, Partille; Attendance: 350; Referees: Andreas Daviknes Borge, Magnus Muri Nygren (NOR)
6 September 2025; 16:15	Jónsson, Grøtta 8	(20–20)	Tönnesen 8	Partille Arena, Partille; Attendance: 350; Referees: Andreas Daviknes Borge, Magnus Muri Nygren (NOR)
6 September 2025; 16:15	6× (suspension)	Report	2× (suspension)	Partille Arena, Partille; Attendance: 350; Referees: Andreas Daviknes Borge, Magnus Muri Nygren (NOR)

IK Sävehof won 71–60 on aggregate

31 August 2025; 19:00	**MRK Dugo Selo (Croatia)**	**32–29**	**(Croatia) MRK Sesvete**	Sportska Dvorana Dugo Selo, Dugo Selo; Attendance: 1,000; Referees: Svetoslav Yovchev, Zvezdelin Yonchev (BUL)
31 August 2025; 19:00	Markušic 7	(18–15)	Raužan 6	Sportska Dvorana Dugo Selo, Dugo Selo; Attendance: 1,000; Referees: Svetoslav Yovchev, Zvezdelin Yonchev (BUL)
31 August 2025; 19:00	1× (yellow card) 4× (suspension)	Report	1× (yellow card) 5× (suspension)	Sportska Dvorana Dugo Selo, Dugo Selo; Attendance: 1,000; Referees: Svetoslav Yovchev, Zvezdelin Yonchev (BUL)

6 September 2025; 19:00	**MRK Sesvete (Croatia)**	**35–24**	**(Croatia) MRK Dugo Selo**	Srednja škola Jelkovec, Sesvete; Attendance: 1,450; Referees: Boris Mandak, Mario Rudinsky (SVK)
6 September 2025; 19:00	Hršak 7	(16–8)	Buvinic, Celegin 5	Srednja škola Jelkovec, Sesvete; Attendance: 1,450; Referees: Boris Mandak, Mario Rudinsky (SVK)
6 September 2025; 19:00	1× (yellow card) 6× (suspension)	Report	1× (yellow card) 7× (suspension) 2× (red card)	Srednja škola Jelkovec, Sesvete; Attendance: 1,450; Referees: Boris Mandak, Mario Rudinsky (SVK)

MRK Sesvete won 64–56 on aggregate

31 August 2025; 16:00	**Elverum Håndball (Norway)**	**38–28**	**(Spain) Bathco BM Torrelavega**	Terningen Arena, Elverum; Attendance: 1,518; Referees: Zan Puksic, Miha Satler (SLO)
31 August 2025; 16:00	Toft 8	(23–16)	Prokop, Martínez 6	Terningen Arena, Elverum; Attendance: 1,518; Referees: Zan Puksic, Miha Satler (SLO)
31 August 2025; 16:00	4× (suspension)	Report	4× (suspension)	Terningen Arena, Elverum; Attendance: 1,518; Referees: Zan Puksic, Miha Satler (SLO)

6 September 2025; 19:30	**Bathco BM Torrelavega (Spain)**	**28–29**	**(Norway) Elverum Håndball**	Pabellón Municipal Vicente Trueba, Torrelavega; Attendance: 2,000; Referees: Jakub Uhlíř, Vojtěch Beňuš (CZE)
6 September 2025; 19:30	Moyano, Prokop 5	(13–12)	Máthé, Heldal 6	Pabellón Municipal Vicente Trueba, Torrelavega; Attendance: 2,000; Referees: Jakub Uhlíř, Vojtěch Beňuš (CZE)
6 September 2025; 19:30	5× (suspension)	Report	8× (suspension) 2× (red card)	Pabellón Municipal Vicente Trueba, Torrelavega; Attendance: 2,000; Referees: Jakub Uhlíř, Vojtěch Beňuš (CZE)

Elverum Håndball won 67–56 on aggregate

30 August 2025; 20:00	**MRK Čakovec (Croatia)**	**28–31**	**(Switzerland) BSV Bern**	Graditeljska škola Čakovec, Čakovec; Attendance: 1,970; Referees: Ivars Čerņavskis, Edmunds Bogdanovs (LAT)
30 August 2025; 20:00	Levak 5	(15–13)	Wanner 11	Graditeljska škola Čakovec, Čakovec; Attendance: 1,970; Referees: Ivars Čerņavskis, Edmunds Bogdanovs (LAT)
30 August 2025; 20:00	1× (yellow card) 3× (suspension)	Report	6× (suspension)	Graditeljska škola Čakovec, Čakovec; Attendance: 1,970; Referees: Ivars Čerņavskis, Edmunds Bogdanovs (LAT)

7 September 2025; 18:00	**BSV Bern (Switzerland)**	**42–27**	**(Croatia) MRK Čakovec**	Mobiliar Arena, Gümligen; Attendance: 612; Referees: Péter Horváth, Balázs Márton (HUN)
7 September 2025; 18:00	Wanner 7	(21–13)	Levak 6	Mobiliar Arena, Gümligen; Attendance: 612; Referees: Péter Horváth, Balázs Márton (HUN)
7 September 2025; 18:00	1× (yellow card) 5× (suspension)	Report	1× (yellow card) 5× (suspension)	Mobiliar Arena, Gümligen; Attendance: 612; Referees: Péter Horváth, Balázs Márton (HUN)

BSV Bern won 73–55 on aggregate

30 August 2025; 15:00	**SAH - Skanderborg (Denmark)**	**38–25**	**(Portugal) Maritimo da Madeira Andebol SAD**	Djurslands Bank Arena, Aarhus; Attendance: 675; Referees: Anatoly Novikov, Mindaugas Gatelis
30 August 2025; 15:00	three players 6	(22–12)	Pina 7	Djurslands Bank Arena, Aarhus; Attendance: 675; Referees: Anatoly Novikov, Mindaugas Gatelis
30 August 2025; 15:00	1× (yellow card) 1× (suspension)	Report	2× (suspension)	Djurslands Bank Arena, Aarhus; Attendance: 675; Referees: Anatoly Novikov, Mindaugas Gatelis

7 September 2025; 20:00	**Maritimo da Madeira Andebol SAD (Portugal)**	**31–36**	**(Denmark) SAH - Skanderborg**	Pavilhão do Marítimo, Madeira; Attendance: 600; Referees: Yann Carmaux, Julien Mursch (FRA)
7 September 2025; 20:00	Pina 13	(16–19)	Hansen 8	Pavilhão do Marítimo, Madeira; Attendance: 600; Referees: Yann Carmaux, Julien Mursch (FRA)
7 September 2025; 20:00	1× (yellow card) 2× (suspension)	Report	2× (suspension)	Pavilhão do Marítimo, Madeira; Attendance: 600; Referees: Yann Carmaux, Julien Mursch (FRA)

SAH - Skanderborg won 74–56 on aggregate

=== Special Qualification Play off ===
Unlike the other Play offs, the losers of this tie will drop down to the European Cup.

Team 1	Agg.	Team 2	1st leg	2nd leg
**RK Partizan** (Serbia)	61–53	(Czech Republic) HCB Karviná	31–27	30–26

30 August 2025; 19:00	**RK Partizan (Serbia)**	**31–27**	**(Czech Republic) HCB Karviná**	SC Voždovac, Beograd; Referees: Dorian Sîrbu, Victor Serdiuc (MDA)
30 August 2025; 19:00	Crnoglavac 6	(16–15)	Patzel 7	SC Voždovac, Beograd; Referees: Dorian Sîrbu, Victor Serdiuc (MDA)
30 August 2025; 19:00	4× (suspension)	Report	5× (suspension)	SC Voždovac, Beograd; Referees: Dorian Sîrbu, Victor Serdiuc (MDA)

6 September 2025; 19:00	**HCB Karviná (Czech Republic)**	**26–30**	**(Serbia) RK Partizan**	Házenkářská hala STARS, Karviná; Attendance: 1200; Referees: Kristof Altmar, Marton Horvath (HUN)
6 September 2025; 19:00	Patzel 9	(14–17)	Ivanov 9	Házenkářská hala STARS, Karviná; Attendance: 1200; Referees: Kristof Altmar, Marton Horvath (HUN)
6 September 2025; 19:00	8× (suspension)	Report	7× (suspension) 1× (red card)	Házenkářská hala STARS, Karviná; Attendance: 1200; Referees: Kristof Altmar, Marton Horvath (HUN)

RK Partizan won 61–53 on aggregate

== See also ==
- 2025–26 EHF Champions League
- 2025–26 EHF European League
- 2025–26 EHF European Cup
- 2025–26 Women's EHF Champions League
- 2025–26 Women's EHF European League
- 2025–26 Women's EHF European Cup
