= Šimonović =

Šimonović (pronounced [ʃimǒːnoʋitɕ]) is a Croatian surname. Notable people with the surname include:

- Dubravka Šimonović (born 1958), Croatian lawyer and UN special rapporteur
- Ivan Šimonović (born 1959), Croatian diplomat, politician and law scholar

== See also ==
- Šimunović
- Simonović
