= Simo Kuzmanović =

Bosnian-Herzegovinian-Swiss footballer

Personal information
- Full name: Simo Kuzmanović
- Date of birth: 1 June 1986 (age 40)
- Place of birth: Derventa, SFR Yugoslavia
- Height: 1.82 m (6 ft 0 in)
- Position: Striker

Senior career*
Years	Team	Apps	(Gls)
2004–2005	Widnau		
2005–2006	Chur 97		
2005–2006	Gossau		
2006–2007	Altstetten		
2007–2008	Höchst	47	(6)
2009	Modriča	7	(0)
2009–2010	Sloga Doboj		
- * Club domestic league appearances and goals

Simo Kuzmanović (Serbian Cyrillic: Симо Кузмановић; born 1 June 1986 in Derventa) is a retired Bosnian-Herzegovinian football striker.

He also hold Swiss nationality.

== Club career ==
He had played with Swiss clubs FC Widnau, FC Chur 97, FC Gossau and FC Altstetten, Austrian FC Höchst and Premier League of Bosnia and Herzegovina club FK Modriča.
