= Radoje Simić =

Serbian politician

Radoje Simić (Serbian Cyrillic: Радоје Симић; born 30 May 1956) is a Serbian politician. He was a member of the National Assembly of Serbia from 2001 to 2004, serving as a member of the Democratic Party (Demokratska stranka, DS), and has held high municipal office in Vrnjačka Banja.

== Private career ==
Simić is a private entrepreneur.

== Politician ==
=== People's Party ===
Simić entered political life as a member of Milan Paroški's People's Party (Narodna stranka, NS). He was given the second position on a coalition electoral list including the NS in the Kragujevac division for the 1992 Serbian parliamentary election. He later appeared in the same position (after Paroški) on the NS's list for Kragujevac in the 1993 parliamentary election. In both cases, the list failed to cross the electoral threshold for assembly representation. In 1995, the People's Party merged into the Democratic Party.

During this period, Serbian and Yugoslavian politics were dominated by the Socialist Party of Serbia (Socijalistička partija Srbije, SPS) under the authoritarian leadership of Slobodan Milošević.

=== Democratic Party ===
In 2000, the Democratic Party participated in the Democratic Opposition of Serbia (Demokratska opozicija Srbije, DOS), a broad and ideologically diverse coalition of parties opposed to Milošević's administration. DOS candidate Vojislav Koštunica defeated Milošević in the 2000 Yugoslavian presidential election, a watershed moment in Serbian politics. The DOS also won several landmark victories in the concurrent 2000 Serbian local elections; in Vrnjačka Banja, the coalition defeated the SPS's alliance, twenty seats to thirteen. The DOS formed government in the municipality, and Simić was appointed as president of its executive committee.

Serbia's government fell after Milošević's defeat, and a new parliamentary election was held in December 2000. Prior to the election, Serbia's electoral laws were reformed such that the entire country was counted as a single division and all mandates were awarded to candidates on successful lists at the discretion of the sponsoring parties or coalitions, irrespective of numerical order. Simić appeared in the 102nd position on the DOS's list and was given a mandate after the coalition won a landslide victory with 176 out of 250 seats. His term began when the assembly convened in January 2001. He served on the committee for relations with Serbs outside Serbia, the committee for trade and tourism, and the committee for Kosovo and Metohija.

The DOS became divided into multiple factions after the 2000 elections. In October 2003, a dissident DOS faction in Vrnjačka Banja joined with the Socialist Party to remove the municipality's leadership, including Simić, amid accusations of corruption.

The DS fielded its own list in the 2003 Serbian parliamentary election, and Simić was included in the 210th position. The list won thirty-seven seats, and he was not given a second mandate. His term in the assembly ended in early 2004.

=== Liberal Democratic Party ===
The Democratic Party split after the 2003 election, and Simić joined the breakaway Liberal Democratic Party (Liberalno demokratska partija, LDP) on its formation in 2005. He was included on the LDP's lists in the 2007 and 2008 parliamentary elections, although he did not receive a mandate on either occasion.

Simić also led the LDP's list for Vrnjačka Banja in the 2008 Serbian local elections, which were held concurrently with the parliamentary vote, and took a mandate after the list won a single seat.

=== Banja Is the Law ===
Simić left the LDP after the 2008 elections and formed a local political party called Banja Is the Law. The local election in Vrnjačka Banja did not produce a clear winner, and a repeat election was held in late 2008. Simić led his party's list and once again took a mandate when the list won two seats. In 2011, he sided with the DS-led governing coalition on a crucial vote, providing it with a functioning majority.

Serbia's election laws were reformed again in 2011, such that mandates were awarded in numerical order to candidates on successful lists. Simić led his own list in the 2012 local elections and was re-elected when the list won three mandates. For the 2016 local elections, he brought his party into an alliance with the Democratic Party, received the second position on their combined list, and was again re-elected when the list won two mandates. He did not seek re-election in 2020.
