= Simonović =

Simonović (Serbian Cyrillic: Симоновић, pronounced [simǒːnoʋitɕ]) is a Serbo-Croatian surname, a patronymic derived from the given name Simon. Notable people with the surname include:

- Ana Simonović (born 1969), Serbian politician and biologist
- Boško Simonović (1898–1965), Yugoslavian football coach, player, referee, and administrator
- Čolak-Anta Simonović (1777–1853), Serbian commander
- Dragoljub Simonović (footballer) (born 1972), Bulgarian - Serbian former footballer
- Ifigenija Zagoričnik Simonović (born 1953), Slovene poet, essayist, writer, editor and potter
- Ljubodrag Simonović (born 1949), Serbian philosopher, author and former basketball player
- Marko Simonović (basketball, born 1982), Serbian assistant coach for Serbia men's national under-19 basketball team
- Marko Simonović (basketball, born 1986), Serbian basketball player (Hemofarm, Budućnost, Crvena zvezda, Zenit Saint Petersburg) and coach
- Marko Simonović (basketball, born 1999), Montenegrin basketball player (Olimpija Ljubljana, Mega Basket, Chicago Bulls)
- Saša Simonović (born 1975), former Serbian footballer
- Stojan Simonović (1872–1937), Serbian Chetnik, nicknamed Koruba

== See also ==
- Simović
- Šimonović
- Simunović
