= Anđelka Bego-Šimunić =

Bosnian-Herzegovinian composer (1941–2022)

Andjelka Bego-Šimunić
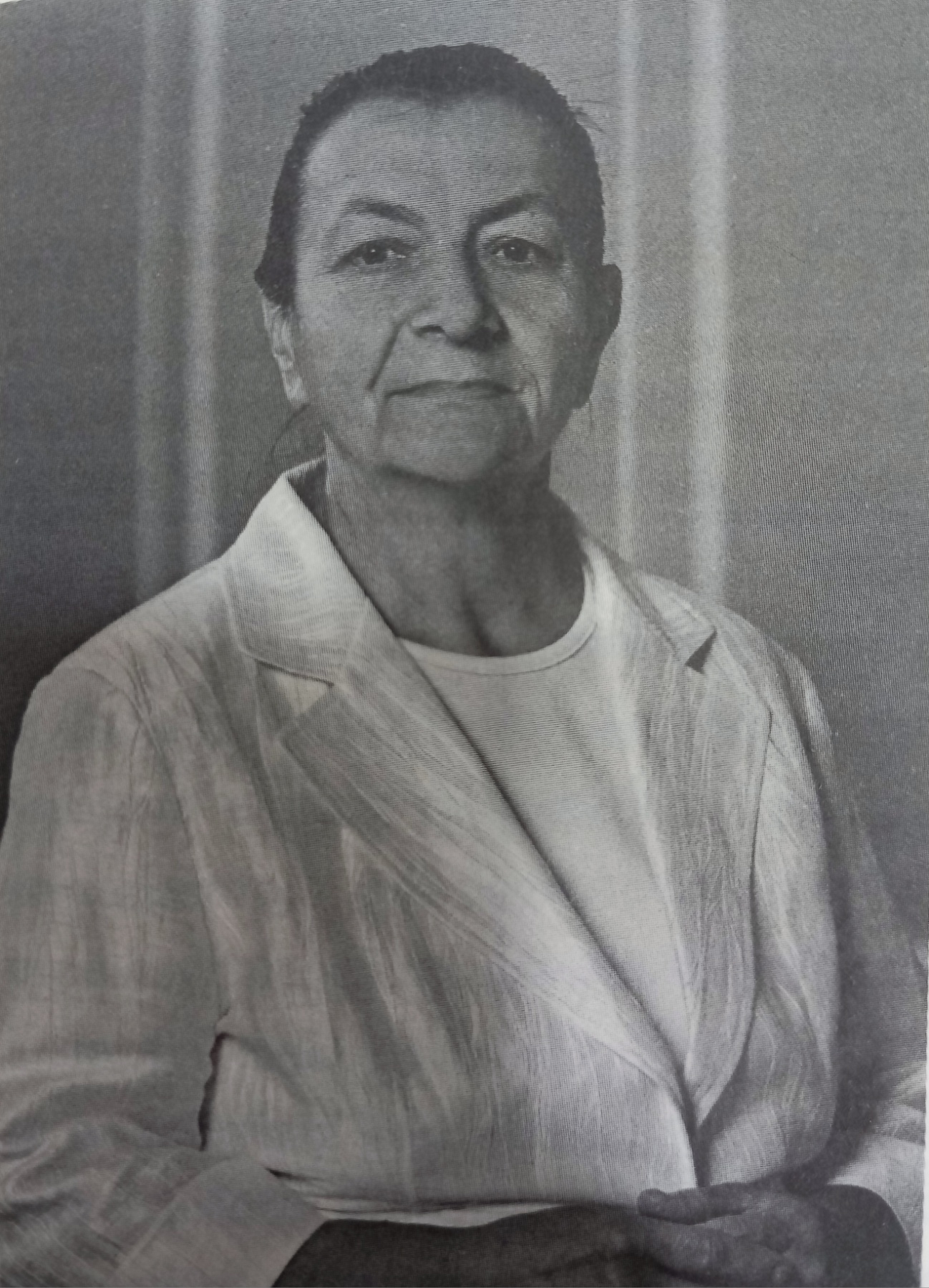
- Born: October 10, 1941; Sarajevo, Bosnia and Herzegovina
- Died: February 9, 2022 (aged 80); Sarajevo, Bosnia and Herzegovina

Anđelka Bego-Šimunić (23 October 1941 – 9 February 2022) was a Bosnian-Herzegovinian composer of Croatian descent. She taught at the Sarajevo Music Academy in Sarajevo, Bosnia and Herzegovina.

== Biography ==
She studied composition at the academy under Ivan Brkanović and Miroslav Špiler, earning a master's degree in 1973. Afterwards, she taught theory at the secondary music school in Sarajevo. She joined the staff of the academy in 1975, and later became assistant (1985) and full professor at the academy, where her students include Igor Karaca. From 1986 to 1992 she was president of the Bosnian composers’ association (1986–1992) and one of the principal organizers of the Days of Musical Creation festival.

Her music is mostly neo-classical in style, influenced by Sergei Prokofiev's extended tonality and treatment of form, with elements of neo-romanticism, particularly in the style of Franz Liszt, and early Expressionism. Her works occasionally refer to Bosnian folklore.

== Works ==
(selective list)

=== Instrumental ===
- Sonatina in E♭, pf, 1963
- Allegretto scherzoso, sym. orch, 1963
- Gudački kvartet br.1, str qt, 1964
- Simfonija br.1, sym. orch, 1966
- Pf Conc., 1970
- Koncertni stavak, sym. orch, 1971
- Ad perpetuam memoriam, cycle of preludes, pf, 1976
- Capriccio, vc, 1976
- Dvije premeditacije br.1–2, str orch, 1977
- Premeditacija br.3, va, vc, pf, 1978
- Sonatni stavak, bn, pf, 1979
- Premeditacija br.4, sym. orch, 1979
- Intermezzo, vn, pf, 1981
- Premeditacija br.5, va, pf, 1982
- Trio, fl, vn, pf, 1983
- Moviment, fl, cl, cembalo, str qt, 1984
- Sonanse, pf, 1985
- Intermezzo, str orch, 1985
- Improvizacij, pf, 1987
- Sonatni stavak, pf, 1988
- Premeditacija br.7, str orch, 1988
- Cornus, pf, 1989
- Largo con Allegro, tpt, 1990
- Duo, 2 cl, 1991
- Concerto cantico, vn, orch, 1994

=== Vocal ===
Adapted from Historija muzike u Bosni i Hercegovini (219–20), by permission of Institut za muzikologiju Muzičke akademije u Sarajevu.

- Čarobna frula (cycle, J. Kaštelan), Bar, pf, 1964
- Minijature, female chorus, 1987
- Ponoćne pjesme (cycle, T. Ujević), S, orch, 1989
- Vjetar noću (cycle, M. Krleža), S, pf, 1994
- Balada o pjesniku, S, pf, 1997
