= Dušan Šimić =

Serbian-Slovenian footballer

Personal information
- Date of birth: July 22, 1980 (age 46)
- Place of birth: Kragujevac, Yugoslavia
- Height: 1.85 m (6 ft 1 in)
- Position: Midfielder

Senior career*
Years	Team	Apps	(Gls)
1997–1998	Šumadija		
1999–2001	OFK Beograd	0	(0)
2001–2004	Karpaty Lviv	14	(1)
2002	→ Karpaty-2 Lviv	17	(1)
2002	→ Karpaty-3 Lviv	1	(0)
2003	→ Pusan i.cons (loan)	28	(0)
2004–2005	Békéscsaba	10	(1)
2006	Ceahlăul	19	(0)
2007	Braşov	12	(1)
2007–2010	Vlasina	24	(1)
- * Club domestic league appearances and goals

Dušan Šimić (born July 22, 1980) is a Serbian retired footballer. He also holds Slovenian nationality.

== Career ==
Šimić started playing at Šumadija 1903 in Serbia and Montenegro, followed by a period of playing for OFK Beograd before joining Ukraine's Premier League team Karpaty Lviv, in the winter of 2001/2002. He made his debut for Karpaty on 21 April 2002 in a match won 1–0 against Vorskla Poltava. He scored his first goal for Karpaty on 12 July 2002 in the 2nd round match against Metalurh Zaporizhya won 1–0. For the 2003 season he was loaned out by Karpaty to South Korea's K-League team Pusan i.cons, where he made 35 appearances. He returned from the loan in February 2004, but he transferred to Hungarian First Division team Békéscsaba Előre. In the first half of the 2006/2007 season Šimić played for Ceahlăul Piatra Neamţ in the Romanian First Division, and after the winter break, in the second half of the season for FC Brașov in Second Division. In 2007, he was registered at the Serbian Second Division team Vlasina, that was to end the season 16th and be relegated to Serbian League East.
