= Ágnes Simor =

Ágnes Simor (Hungarian name order Simor Ágnes) (born 23 December 1979 in Budapest) is a Hungarian actress, dancer, who, from 2006 to 2011, was Cultural Head of Tűzraktér Independent Cultural Center, initially "Tűzraktér - Independent Cultural Center", created by Etienne Samin and directed between 2004 and 2005 by Gyevi-Biro Eszter and Etienne Samin.

== Life ==
Her father is András Simor (poet), her mother is Éva Dobos (literary translator). She began her dance and theater studies at Margit Földessy Drama Studio and in the Creative Movement Studio. She has been featured in television productions with her own script. At the high school she was stage manager of English and German theatrical performances and continued her advancement in theater studies. She graduated from the faculty of literature, aesthetics and drama pedagogy of Eötvös Loránd University of Budapest. At the Budapest Dance and Arts School she obtained her degree in intensive training in contemporary dance. She improved her knowledge in special dances and movement theater styles including Latin American dances and Japanese Butoh dance. Between 2005 and 2011 she was the cultural director of the Independent Cultural Center Tűzraktér; Since her academic years, she has appeared in important artistic groups and independent productions.

== Works ==
Theatrical works:

=== With KASZT company ===
- 2001- Samuel Beckett: Plays - Corvinus University of Budapest
- 2001- Tárgyak és Képek (Objects and Pictures) - Corvinus University of Budapest
- 2002- Don't Talk! - based on Samuel Beckett - Corvinus University of Budapest
- 2003- Hétköznapi Hisztéria (Weekday History) - café scenes - Pszinapszis festival, Budapest
- 2003-2008 Hétköznapi Hisztéria (Weekday History) - based on György Petri's poems - Kaleidoszkóp Award Miskolc-Budapest, Corvinus University of Budapest

Puppet show:

2005 - Puppet Opera - Millenáris Padlásszínház (Millenáris Attic Theatre), Budapest

=== Dance Performances (choreography, dance) ===
- 2003 - The sun and the moon story - Mu Theatre
- 2004 - Jump over my shadow, then jump over myself - Mu Theatre, Budapest Dance School
- 2004 - Simpla impro - Szimplakert, Budapest
- 2005 - Calavera - Mu Theatre
- 2006 - The sun and the moon story - (2-face mask solo) Merlin Theatre, Budapest
- 2007- Under Clouds - Roma Self-government
- 2008- The sun and the moon story - Tűzraktér, Budapest
- 2011- Wo-man - Andaxínház, Budapest
- 2011- Performances in Japan:
  - Nomades contemporary dance company (Tokyo)
  - Kazuo Ohno Festival
  - Being connected - solo dance, Yokohama Triennale
- 2012- Being connected - solo - Közép Európa Táncszínház (Central Europe Dance Theater), Budapest

=== Performances ===
- Neighborhood - arts performances at the Opera House, Budspest
- Hungarian Painting Day - Exhibition opening (Atlas Gabor's choreography)
- Bottle Dance - exhibition opening Zsuzsa Cserje (dramaturge, director) collection
- Murányi Zsófia's performance - Gödör Klub, Budapest
- Dancing Fashion Shows for Stiaszny Terézia's outfits

== Awards ==
- 2004: Dont't Talk! - Pécs Délibáb Festival Special Award
- 2005: Weekday History - Kaleidoszkóp Festivel, Movement Theatre Grand Prix
- 2006: Award of Ministry of Culture
- 2010: Pro Urbe Budapest
- 2011: Carnival of Cultures, Berlin - Second Award and invitation to closing ceremonies of the EU Delegation

== Sources ==
- http://revolutionartua.blogspot.hu/2011/03/our-speakers.html
- http://www.dunapart.net/en/program/schedule.html?cikk_id=5831
- http://issuu.com/art.co/docs/art.co_2011_10
