= Nebojša Simić =

Montenegrin handball player (born 1993)

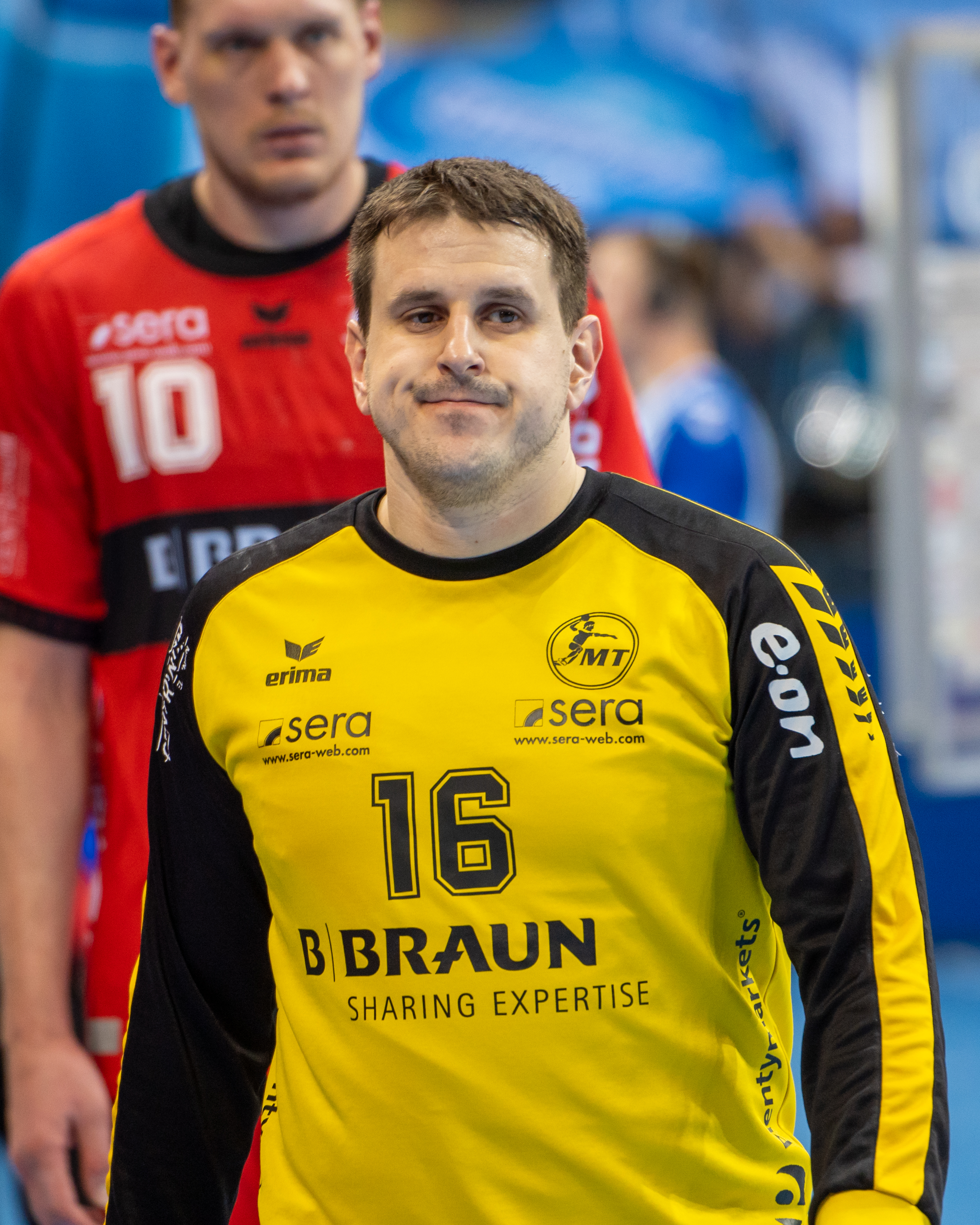

Personal information
- Nationality: Montenegrin
- Born: 19 January 1993 (age 33) Bar, FR Yugoslavia
- Height: 1.94 m (6 ft 4 in)

Sport
- Sport: Handball
- Position: Goalkeeper
- Current club: MT Melsungen
- Number: 16

Senior clubs
- Years: Team
- 2004–2008: RK Sedmerac
- 2008–2010: RK Mornar Bar
- 2010–2012: RK Lovćen
- 2012–2013: H 43 Lund
- 2013–2015: HK Malmö
- 2015–2017: IFK Kristianstad
- 2017–: MT Melsungen
National team
Years	Team	Apps	(Gls)
–	Montenegro	64	(3)

Nebojša Simić (born 19 January 1993) is a Montenegrin handball player for MT Melsungen and the Montenegrin national team.

Due to his performance in the 2022 European Men's Handball Championship, he was nicknamed "Minister of Defence" and "Superman Simić" by the Montenegrin fans and famous sports commentator Nebojša Šofranac.

His brother Božidar Simić is also a handball player.

== Honours ==
MT Melsungen

EHF European League: Gold: 2026

EHF European League Finals MVP 2026
