= Mario Simunovic =

Swedish footballer

Personal information
- Full name: Mario Simunovic
- Date of birth: 20 October 1989 (age 37)
- Place of birth: Degerfors, Sweden
- Height: 6 ft 1 in (1.85 m)
- Position: Attacking midfielder

Team information
- Current team: Villastadens IF
- Number: 6

Youth career
- 2006–2008: Degerfors IF

Senior career*
Years	Team	Apps	(Gls)
2009	Degerfors IF	5	(0)
2010–2013	Carlstad United BK	16	(1)
2013–	Villastadens IF	1	(1)

International career
2009–2011	Sweden U21	6	(0)
- * Club domestic league appearances and goals

Mario Simunovic (born 20 October 1989 in Degerfors) is a Swedish footballer of Croatian descent, who currently plays for Villastadens IF.

== Club career ==
Simunovic started in the youth ranks in his home town team Degerfors IF and rose through the ranks to the senior team. With the signature of new striker Peter Samuelsson, Simunovic had a hard time to keep his place as first-choice striking option and started games from the bench or played in the midfield. He told the local media that he wants more playing time.

In November Simunovic traveled to England for a trial at Doncaster Rovers and impressed in a trial match with the club against Mansfield Town. He also trained with Notts County. Simunovic agent Bryan Yeubrey claims Birmingham City and Sheffield United have all made enquiries too. Swedish club Ängelholms FF were interested as well.

On November 19, local newspaper Karlskoga Kurriren announced that Degerfors IF had agreed with Doncaster Rovers for Simunovic signature. Simunovic was in January 2010 on trial with Swansea City football club with a view to a permanent move to South Wales. On January 19 he played from start with the Swansea City Reserves against Llanelli A.F.C.

== Style of play ==
Doncaster manager Sean O'Driscoll describes Simunovic as "a wide attacking player".

== Personal life ==
In Sweden, Simunovic worked part-time as a teacher.
