= Eduard Šimun =

Slovak ice hockey player

- Born: 27 December 1994 (age 31) Topoľčany, Slovakia
- Height: 6 ft 4 in (193 cm)
- Weight: 220 lb (100 kg; 15 st 10 lb)
- Position: Centre
- Shoots: Left
- Slovak team Former teams: HC Košice; HC Topoľčany; HC '05 Banská Bystrica; HK Orange 20; Varberg HK; HC Dynamo Pardubice; Draci Šumperk; HK Dukla Trenčín; HC Nové Zámky; HC Slovan Bratislava; HK Nitra; HK Dukla Michalovce; HC 21 Prešov
- NHL draft: Undrafted
- Playing career: 2012–present

Eduard Šimun (born 27 December 1994) is a Slovak professional ice hockey player currently playing for HC Košice of the Slovak Extraliga.

Šimun made his Slovak Extraliga debut playing with HC ’05 Banská Bystrica during the 2012–13 Slovak Extraliga season. He has also played for HK Dukla Trenčín and HC Nové Zámky as well for HC Dynamo Pardubice of the Czech Extraliga and HC Slovan Bratislava of the Kontinental Hockey League.

== Career statistics ==
=== Regular season and playoffs ===
| | | | Regular season | | | | | Playoffs |
| Season | Team | League | GP | G | A | Pts | PIM | GP | G | A | Pts | PIM |
| KHL totals | | | 11 | 0 | 1 | 1 | 2 | — | — | — | — | — |
| Czech totals | | | 6 | 1 | 1 | 2 | 0 | — | — | — | — | — |
| Slovak totals | | | 220 | 42 | 41 | 83 | 75 | 8 | 3 | 1 | 4 | 0 |

=== International ===
| Year | Team | Event | Result | GP | G | A | Pts | PIM |
|---|---|---|---|---|---|---|---|---|
| 2012 | Slovakia | WJC18-D1 | 11th | 5 | 0 | 3 | 3 | 0 |
| 2014 | Slovakia | WJC | 8th | 5 | 0 | 0 | 0 | 0 |
| Junior totals | | | | 10 | 0 | 3 | 3 | 0 |
