= Samo (given name) =

Samo is a given name which may refer to:

- Samo (7th Century CE), First ruler of Slavic tribes in Greater Moravia
- Samo Chalupka (1812–1883), Slovak romantic poet
- Samo Kuščer (born 1952), Slovenian physicist and writer
- Samo Tomášik (1813–1887), Slovak romantic poet and writer
- Samo Udrih (born 1979), Slovenian basketball player
- Samo Vidovič (born 1968), Slovenian retired footballer
- Samo (born 1975), Mexican singer
