= Šimunić =

Šimunić is a Croatian surname. Notable people with the surname include:

- Anđelka Bego-Šimunić (born 1941), Bosnian-Herzegovinian composer
- Boštjan Šimunič (born 1974), Slovenian triple jumper
- Josip Šimunić (born 1978), Croatian footballer
- Tajana Šimunić Rosing, American computer scientist and computer engineer
- Vladimir Šimunić (1919–1993), Croatian footballer

== See also ==
- Šimun
- Simunić
