= Noa-Gabriel Šimić =

Croatian footballer (born 2004)

Personal information
- Date of birth: 21 July 2004 (age 22)
- Place of birth: Germany
- Height: 1.77 m (5 ft 10 in)
- Position: Winger

Team information
- Current team: Wacker Burghausen
- Number: 16

Youth career
- FC Augsburg
- Borussia Dortmund

Senior career*
Years	Team	Apps	(Gls)
2022	FC Augsburg II	3	(0)
2022–2024	Borussia Dortmund II	0	(0)
2023–2024	→ FC Rot-Weiß Erfurt (loan)	12	(1)
2024–2025	SpVgg Unterhaching	11	(1)
2025–	Wacker Burghausen	30	(5)

International career
2021	Croatia U18	3	(0)
2022	Croatia U19	2	(0)
- * Club domestic league appearances and goals as of 27 September 2026

Noa-Gabriel Šimić (born 21 July 2004) is a footballer who plays as a midfielder for winger for Regionalliga Bayern club Wacker Burghausen. Born in Germany, he is a Croatia youth international.

== Early life ==
Noa-Gabriel Šimić came through the youth academy of FC Augsburg, where he spent the majority of his formative years, before joining the youth setup of Borussia Dortmund in 2022. That season, he made eighteen appearances and scored eleven goals.

== Club career ==
In 2022, he signed for German side Borussia Dortmund II. In 2023, he was sent on loan to German side FC Rot-Weiß Erfurt, where he suffered an injury.

On 5 July 2024, Šimić moved to SpVgg Unterhaching.

On 9 July 2025, Šimić signed a one-year contract with German Regionalliga Bayern club SV Wacker Burghausen, with an option to extend his stay.

== International career ==
He has represented Croatia internationally at youth level. He is eligible to represent Croatia internationally through his parents and is eligible to represent Germany internationally, having been born in the country.

== Style of play ==
He mainly operates as a winger and is known for his speed. He has also operated as a central midfielder.

== Personal life ==
He is the son of Blaženko Šimić. He has two brothers and a sister.
