= Goran Simić (singer) =

Goran Simić (Belgrade, 1953 – Vienna, 2008) was a Serbian bass. He was a member of the Sarajevo Opera (1978-1984) and the Vienna State Opera (1984–2008), where he sang 55 different roles in 1,095 performances. He was in "Un ballo in maschera" with Plácido Domingo in the role of Samuel. He died the 28 November 2008 in Vienna following a long illness.
