= Simo (surname) =

Simo is a surname which may refer to:

- Alfredo Fernández Simó (1915–1991), Dominican novelist, poet and diplomat
- Ana María Simo (born 1943), New York playwright, essayist and novelist
- Anna Simó (born 1968), Catalan politician
- Augustine Simo (born 1978), Cameroonian footballer
- Fidji Simo (born 1985), French businesswoman
- Isabel-Clara Simó (1943–2020), Valencian (Spanish) journalist and writer
- JD Simo (born 1985), American blues and rock musician
- Lajos Simó (1943–2019), Hungarian former handball player
- Manuel Simó Marín (1868-1936), Spanish right-wing politician
- Mariví Simó (born 1983), Spanish football defender
- Sándor Simó (1934–2001), Hungarian film producer, director and screenwriter
