= Jaka Malus =

Slovenian handball player

Personal information
- Nationality: Slovenian
- Born: 15 June 1996 (age 30) Celje, Slovenia
- Height: 1.91 m (6 ft 3 in)

Sport
- Sport: Handball
- Position: Centre back
- Current club: RK Vardar 1961
- Number: 66

Senior clubs
- Years: Team
- 2013–2019: RK Celje
- 2019–2022: HC Meshkov Brest
- 2022: Unicaja Banco Sinfín
- 2022–2024: Frisch Auf Göppingen
- 2024–2025: RD LL Grosist Slovan
- 2025–: RK Vardar 1961
National team
Years	Team	Apps	(Gls)
2018–	Slovenia	13	(17)

Jaka Malus (born 15 June 1996) is a Slovenian handball player who plays for RK Vardar 1961.

== Honours ==
- Macedonian Handball Super League (North Macedonia)

Winner Gold :2026

- Macedonian Cup (North Macedonia)

Winner Gold : 2026
