= Emil Jakobsen =

Danish handball player (born 1998)

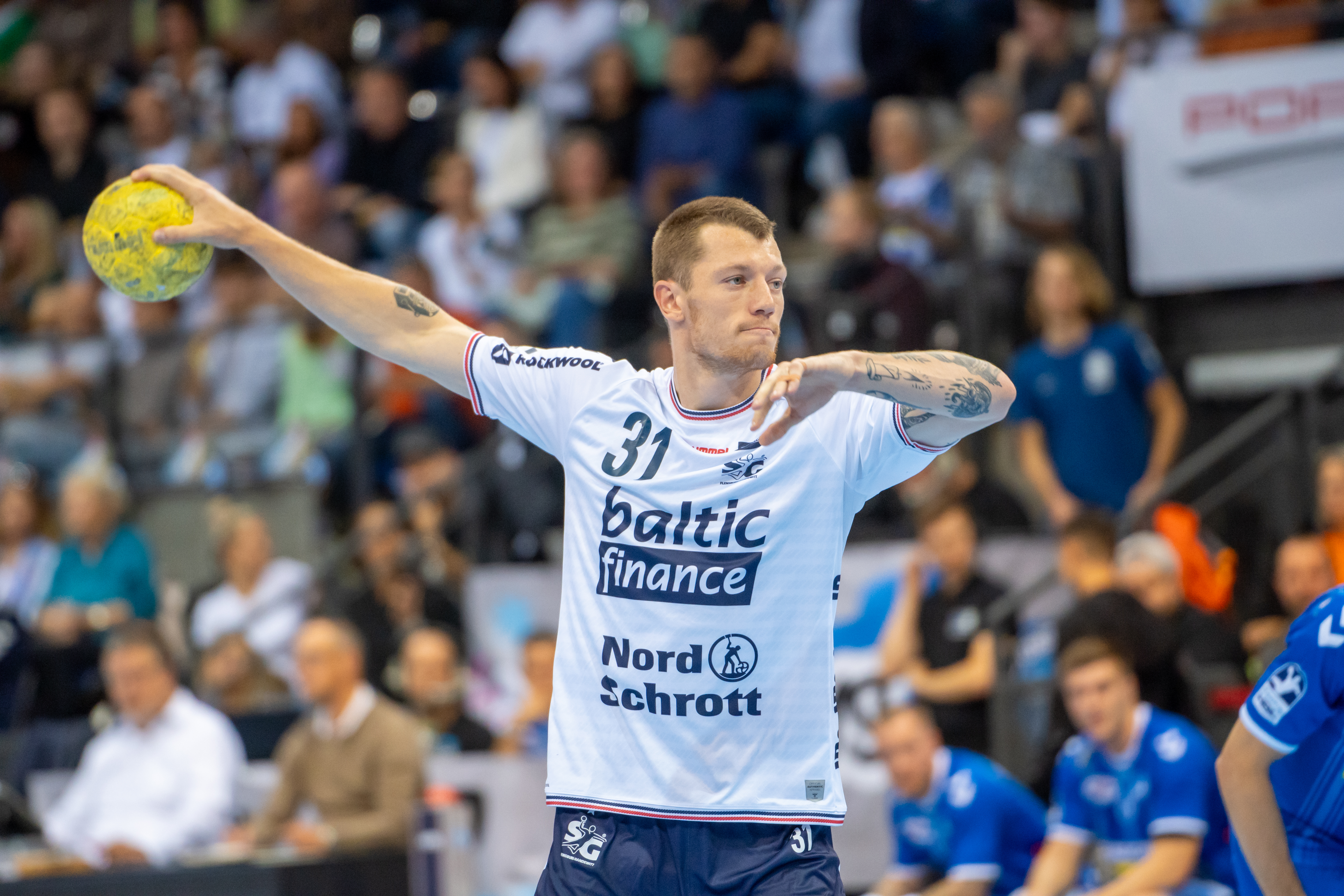
- Jakobsen in 2024

Personal information
- Full name: Emil Manfeldt Jakobsen
- Nationality: Danish
- Born: 24 January 1998 (age 28) Kerteminde, Denmark
- Height: 1.90 m (6 ft 3 in)

Sport
- Sport: Handball
- Position: Left wing
- Current club: SG Flensburg-Handewitt
- Number: 31

Youth career
- Years: Team
- 2001–2011: Kerteminde HK
- 2011–2016: GOG Håndbold

Senior clubs
- Years: Team
- 2016–2021: GOG Håndbold
- 2021–: SG Flensburg-Handewitt
National team
Years	Team	Apps	(Gls)
2019–	Denmark	111	(406)
Medal record
Olympic Games
Gold medal – first place	2024 Paris	Team
Silver medal – second place	2020 Tokyo	Team
World Championship
Gold medal – first place	2021 Egypt
Gold medal – first place	2023 Poland/Sweden
Gold medal – first place	2025 Croatia/Denmark/Norway
European Championship
Gold medal – first place	2026 Denmark/Norway/Sweden
Silver medal – second place	2024 Germany
Bronze medal – third place	2022 Hungary/Slovakia
Youth World Championship
Bronze medal – third place	2017 Georgia
- Updated on 1 February 2026

Emil Jakobsen (born 24 January 1998) is a Danish handball player for the German club SG Flensburg-Handewitt and the Danish national team.

He joined his current club, Flensburg-Handewitt in 2021 on a three-year contract. In 2022 he announced that he had prolonged the contract until 2026.

He represented Denmark at the 2021, 2023, and the 2025 World Championships, where he won gold medals on all three occasions. Furthermore, he also won gold modals at the 2024 Olympics.

== Career ==
Jakobsen started playing handball in his hometown at Kerteminde HK. He switched to the GOG Håndbold youth team in 2011. In the 2016/2017, he debuted for the league senior team. In the 2017/18 season, he came third in the league, and in 2018/2019, he came second with GOG. In both season he was named as the 'talent of the season' in Danish handball. In 2019, he won the Danish Men's Handball Cup. In the 2020–2021 season with GOG Håndbold, he was the top scorer in the EHF European League. In the 2020–21 season, he was the topscorer in the ordinary season in the Danish league with 244 goals.

In 2021, he joined the German club SG Flensburg-Handewitt. Here he won the EHF European League in 2024.

At the EHF Excellence Awards in both 2024 and 2025, he was named best left wing in the previous season.

At the 2026 European Men's Handball Championship he won gold medals, meaning that Denmark held both the World, European and Olympic titles at the same time, as only the second team ever after France's 'Les Experts'.

== Personal life ==
He was in a relationship with Danish women's handball player Helena Elver until 2025.

== Achievements ==
- EHF Excellence Awards: Left Wing of the Season 2023/24, 2024/25
- Top Scorer at the 2020–21 EHF European League (96 goals)
- All-Star Team as Best Left wing Danish League: 2019–20, 2020–21
- All-Star Team as Best Left Wing at the 2017 Youth World Championship
- Årets Talent (talent of the year): 2018, 2019
- Danish league topscorer 2021-2022
