= Marko Grgić (handballer) =

German handball player (born 2003)

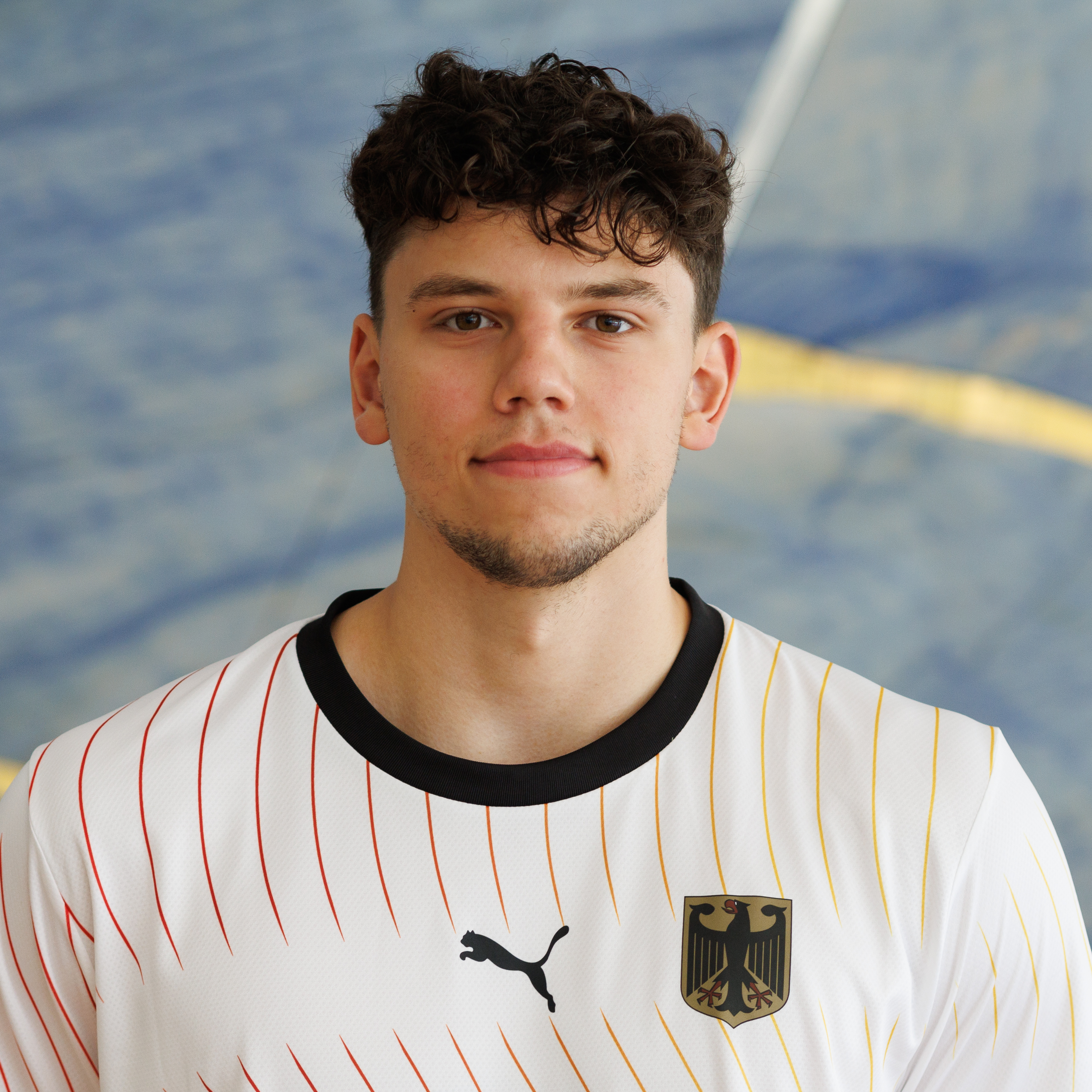
- Grgić in 2024

Personal information
- Nationality: German
- Born: 11 September 2003 (age 23) Eisenach, Germany
- Height: 1.98 m (6 ft 6 in)

Sport
- Sport: Handball
- Position: Left back
- Current club: SG Flensburg-Handewitt
- Number: 17

Senior clubs
- Years: Team
- –2022: HG Saarlouis
- 2022–2025: ThSV Eisenach
- 2025–: SG Flensburg-Handewitt
National team
Years	Team	Apps	(Gls)
2024–	Germany	43	(124)
Medal record
Olympic Games
Silver medal – second place	2024 Paris	Team
European Championship
Silver medal – second place	2026 Denmark/Norway/Sweden
- Updated on 8 November 2026

Marko Grgić (born 11 September 2003) is a German handball player who plays for SG Flensburg-Handewitt and the German national team.

== Club career ==
Grgić played for HG Saarlouis in the 3rd league until 2022. In 2022 he moved to the second division club ThSV Eisenach. With Eisenach he was promoted to the Bundesliga in 2023. In the 2024–25 Handball-Bundesliga he was the top scorer with 301 goals and was named young player of the season. He changed to SG Flensburg-Handewitt in 2025.

== International career ==
Grgić was called up to the extended squad of the German national team for a training course in May 2024 and made his first appearance in a friendly against Sweden on 12 May 2024. He scored his first goal for the national team in his second game a month later in a friendly against France in preparation for the 2024 Summer Olympics. At the Olympics he won a silver medal, losing to Denmark in the final. He scored 16 goals in 8 matches.

At the 2026 European Men's Handball Championship he won silver medals, losing to Denmark in the final once again.

== Personal life ==
His father Danijel Grgić is a former Croatian national handball player who played for ThSV Eisenach from 2003 to 2005. His German mother Ina played in the top league for TSG Ruhla during this time.
