= Simo Mfayela =

South African politician (died 2020)

Simo Mfayela MP

Permanent delegate to the National Council of Provinces from KwaZulu-Natal
- In office 23 May 2019 – 29 December 2020

Personal details
- Born: Simo Ezra Mfayela
- Died: 28 December 2020
- Party: Inkatha Freedom Party
- Relations: Dingizwe Phineas Mfayela (father)
- Occupation: Member of Parliament
- Profession: Politician

Simo Ezra Mfayela (died 28 December 2020) was a South African politician from KwaZulu-Natal who served as a permanent delegate to the National Council of Provinces from May 2019 until his death. He was the sole permanent representative of the Inkatha Freedom Party and the deputy provincial chairperson of the party. Mfayela was the son of the former senator Dingizwe Phineas Mfayela.

== Life and career ==
Mfayela's father, Dingizwe, was a senator and a senior member of the Inkatha Freedom Party. He is deceased. Mfayela was elected deputy provincial chairperson of the IFP in June 2019, deputising for Thamsanqa Ntuli.

== Parliamentary career ==
Mfayela was sworn in as a permanent delegate to the National Council of Provinces on 23 May 2019, following the 2019 general election held on 8 May. He was a member of the KwaZulu-Natal delegation and the sole permanent IFP representative. Mfayela received his committee assignments on 24 June.

=== Committee memberships ===
- Joint Committee on Ethics and Members Interests
- Joint Standing Committee on Defence
- Select Committee on Cooperative Governance and Traditional Affairs, Water and Sanitation and Human Settlements
- Select Committee on Petitions and Executive Undertakings
- Select Committee on Security and Justice

== Death ==
Mfayela died on 28 December 2020.
