= Vladimir Simunović =

Serbian footballer

Personal information
- Date of birth: 30 September 1993 (age 33)
- Place of birth: Zemun, FR Yugoslavia
- Height: 1.88 m (6 ft 2 in)
- Position: Centre-back

Team information
- Current team: Feniks 1995

Youth career
- 1998–2000: Palilulac Beograd
- 2000–2010: Zemun

Senior career*
Years	Team	Apps	(Gls)
2010–2011	Zemun	28	(2)
2011–2013	Kolubara	15	(0)
2014	Zemun	4	(0)
2014–2015	Turbina Vreoci	21	(0)
2015	BSK Borča	10	(0)
2016–2017	Inđija	35	(2)
2017–2018	Radnički Niš	28	(0)
2018–2020	Spartak Subotica	0	(0)
2020–2022	Feniks 1995		
2023	Hajduk Beška		
2023-	Sremac Deč		

International career^{‡}
2009–2010	Serbia U17	14	(2)
- * Club domestic league appearances and goals as of 2 September 2018 ‡ National team caps and goals as of 28 June 2017

Vladimir Simunović (Serbian Cyrillic: Владимир Симуновић; born 30 September 1993) is a Serbian footballer who plays as a defender for FK Feniks 1995.

== Club career ==
Simunović started training football with Palilulac Beograd at the age of 5. Later he moved to Zemun, where he spent a full decade playing in youth categories. He made his first senior appearances with the club in the 2010–11 Serbian First League season. He noted his first senior goals in a match against Radnički Kragujevac on 21 August 2010, when he scored a twice. Next he was a member of football club Kolubara for a period between 2011 and 2013, before he returned to Zemun for the second spell with club in 2014. He also spent the 2014–15 season playing with Turbina Vreoci in the Serbian League Belgrade. Later, he joined BSK Borča for the rest of 2015. At the beginning of next year, he moved to Inđija. Playing for the club, Simunović was the most standard player in squad, making 30 appearances in all competitions with 2 goals at total for the 2016–17 season. In summer 2017, Simunović signed a three-year contract with Radnički Niš. In summer 2018, Simunović sued the club over unpaid wages after which he terminated the contract at the expense of the club and left as a free agent. On the last day of the summer transfer window, Simunović signed with Spartak Subotica.

== International career ==
Simunović was a member of Serbian U17 national team between 2009 and 2010, making 14 appearances with 2 goals. He had also been called into the under-18 level under coach Aleksandar Stanojević for the tournament at Tel Aviv.

== Career statistics ==
=== Club ===
As of 31 August 2018

Club performance			League		Cup		Continental		Total	
Season	Club	League	Apps	Goals	Apps	Goals	Apps	Goals	Apps	Goals
2010–11	Zemun	Serbian First League	28	3 (Note: Including 2 goals against Radnički Kragujevac & 1 against Dinamo Vranje)	—		—		28	3
2011–12	Kolubara	Serbian First League	9	0	—		—		9	0
2012–13	Kolubara	Serbian First League	6	0	1	0	—		7	0
2013–14	Zemun	Serbian League Belgrade	4	0	—		—		4	0
2014–15	Turbina Vreoci	Serbian League Belgrade	21	0	—		—		21	0
2015–16	BSK Borča	Serbian First League	10	0	1	0	—		11	0
2015–16	Inđija	Serbian First League	6 (Note: During the season, Andrija Simunović also played with the club. According to srbijafudbal.com, Vladimir noted 6 caps)	0	—		—		6	0
2016–17	Inđija	Serbian First League	29	2	1	0	—		30	2
2017–18	Radnički Niš	Serbian SuperLiga	28	0	1	0	—		29	0
2018–19	Spartak Subotica	Serbian SuperLiga	0	0	0	0	—		0	0
Career total			141	5	4	0	—		145	5
