= Soumaré =

Soumaré is a surname. Notable people with the surname include:

- Ababacar Sadikh Soumaré (born 1994), Senegalese taekwondo practitioner
- Abdoulaye Soumaré (born 1980), French footballer
- Adama Soumaré (born 1982), French footballer
- Bakary Soumaré (born 1985), Malian footballer
- Boubakary Soumaré (born 1999), French footballer
- Bryan Soumaré (born 1999), French footballer
- Cheikh Hadjibou Soumaré (born 1951), Senegalese politician and Prime Minister of Senegal
- Issa Soumaré (born 2000), Senegalese footballer
- Mamadou Soumaré (born 1992), Malian swimmer
- Mamadou Diocou Soumare (born 2000), Senegalese handball player
- Mohamed Soumaré (born 1996), Guinean footballer
- Moussa Soumaré (born 1997), French footballer
- Moustapha Soumaré, Malian diplomat and UN Special Representative
- Myriam Soumaré (born 1986), French sprinter
- Yaya Soumaré (born 2000), French footballer

== See also ==
- Soumaoro
