= 2025–26 EHF European League group stage =

The 2025–26 EHF European League group stage was played between 14 October and 2 December 2025 to determine the sixteen teams advancing to the main round of the 2025–26 EHF European League.

== Format ==
In each group, teams played against each other in a double round-robin format, with home and away matches. The top two qualify for the main round.

== Draw ==
External videos
- Draw

The draw took place on the at 11:00 CET in Vienna on 18 July 2025. The only restriction was that no clubs from the same country cannot be in the same group.

Key to colours
Teams advancing to the Main round

Pot 1
Team
(Germany) SG Flensburg-Handewitt
(Germany) MT Melsungen
(France) Montpellier Handball
(Portugal) FC Porto
(Spain) Fraikin BM Granollers
(Denmark) Fredericia HK
(Switzerland) Kadetten Schaffhausen
(Sweden) IFK Kristianstad

Pot 2
Team
(Croatia) RK Nexe
(Romania) AHC Potaissa Turda
(Iceland) Knattspyrnufélagið Fram
(Hungary) FTC-Green Collect
(North Macedonia) HC Vardar 1961
(Poland) REBUD KPR Ostrovia Ostrów Wielkopolski
(Slovakia) Tatran Prešov
(Slovenia) RD LL Grosist Slovan

Pot 3
Team
(Germany) THW Kiel
(France) Fenix Toulouse
(Portugal) SL Benfica
(Spain) Abanca Ademar León
(Germany) TSV Hannover-Burgdorf (Note: Team not known at the time of the draw. Was the Play Off 1 Winner in qualification.)
(Denmark) SAH - Skanderborg (Note: Team not known at the time of the draw. Was the Play Off 11 Winner in qualification.)
(Norway) Elverum Håndball (Note: Team not known at the time of the draw. Was the Play Off 9 Winner in qualification.)
(France) Saint-Raphaël Var Handball (Note: Team not known at the time of the draw. Was the Play Off 2 Winner in qualification.)

Pot 4
Team
(Switzerland) BSV Bern (Note: Team not known at the time of the draw. Was the Play Off 10 Winner in qualification.)
(Sweden) IK Sävehof (Note: Team not known at the time of the draw. Was the Play Off 7 Winner in qualification.)
(Croatia) MRK Sesvete (Note: Team not known at the time of the draw. Was the Play Off 8 Winner in qualification.)
(Romania) CS Minaur Baia Mare (Note: Team not known at the time of the draw. Was the Play Off 6 Winner in qualification.)
(Sweden) HF Karlskrona (Note: Team not known at the time of the draw. Was the Play Off 5 Winner in qualification.)
(Switzerland) HC Kriens-Luzern (Note: Team not known at the time of the draw. Was the Play Off 3 Winner in qualification.)
(Spain) Irudek Bidasoa Irún (Note: Team not known at the time of the draw. Was the Play Off 4 Winner in qualification.)
(Serbia) RK Partizan (Note: Team not known at the time of the draw. Was the Special Play Off Winner in qualification.)

== Tiebreakers ==
In the group stage, teams were ranked according to points (2 points for a win, 1 point for a draw, 0 points for a loss), and if tied on points, the following tiebreaking criteria were applied, in the order given, to determine the rankings:

1. Points in matches among tied teams;
2. Goal difference in matches among tied teams;
3. Goal difference in all group matches;
4. Goals scored in all group matches;
5. If more than two teams were tied, and after applying all head-to-head criteria above, a subset of teams were still tied, all head-to-head criteria above were reapplied exclusively to this subset of teams;
6. Drawing lots.

== Groups ==
All times are local.

=== Group A ===
| Pos | Team | Pld | W | D | L | GF | GA | GD | Pts | Qualification | FLE | BID | SRA | POT |
|---|---|---|---|---|---|---|---|---|---|---|---|---|---|---|
| 1 | (Germany) SG Flensburg-Handewitt | 6 | 6 | 0 | 0 | 218 | 180 | +38 | 12 | Main Round | — | 38–35 | 32–30 | 46–28 |
| 2 | (Spain) Irudek Bidasoa Irún | 6 | 3 | 0 | 3 | 201 | 194 | +7 | 6 (Note: Irudek Bidasoa Irún 65–60 Saint-Raphaël Var Handball) | Main Round | 32–33 | — | 33–25 | 35–30 |
| 3 | (France) Saint-Raphaël Var Handball | 6 | 3 | 0 | 3 | 195 | 182 | +13 | 6 | | 29–36 | 35–32 | — | 42–24 |
| 4 | (Romania) AHC Potaissa Turda | 6 | 0 | 0 | 6 | 166 | 224 | −58 | 0 | | 26–33 | 33–34 | 25–34 | — |

Source: EHF
Notes:

| 14 October 2025; 18:45 | AHC Potaissa Turda (Romania) | 33–34 | (Spain) Irudek Bidasoa Irún | Turda Arena, Turda; Attendance: 2,050; Referees: Cernavskis, Bogdanovs (LAT) |
| 14 October 2025; 18:45 | Pinţoiu, Ghiță 7 | (16–16) | R. Salinas 11 | Turda Arena, Turda; Attendance: 2,050; Referees: Cernavskis, Bogdanovs (LAT) |
| 14 October 2025; 18:45 | 1× (yellow card) 5× (suspension) | Report | 1× (yellow card) 4× (suspension) | Turda Arena, Turda; Attendance: 2,050; Referees: Cernavskis, Bogdanovs (LAT) |

| 14 October 2025; 20:45 | SG Flensburg-Handewitt (Germany) | 32–30 | (France) Saint-Raphaël Var Handball | GP Joule Arena, Flensburg; Attendance: 2,794; Referees: Leszczynski, Piechota (POL) |
| 14 October 2025; 20:45 | Jakobsen, Møller 6 | (16–15) | Brasseleur 7 | GP Joule Arena, Flensburg; Attendance: 2,794; Referees: Leszczynski, Piechota (POL) |
| 14 October 2025; 20:45 | 1× (yellow card) 2× (suspension) | Report | 1× (yellow card) 3× (suspension) | GP Joule Arena, Flensburg; Attendance: 2,794; Referees: Leszczynski, Piechota (POL) |

| 21 October 2025; 20:45 | Saint-Raphaël Var Handball (France) | 42–24 | (Romania) AHC Potaissa Turda | Palais des Sports JF Krakowski, Saint-Raphaël; Attendance: 1,600; Referees: Yovchev, Yonchev (BUL) |
| 21 October 2025; 20:45 | Paschal 7 | (21–11) | Dumitriu 5 | Palais des Sports JF Krakowski, Saint-Raphaël; Attendance: 1,600; Referees: Yovchev, Yonchev (BUL) |
| 21 October 2025; 20:45 | 3× (suspension) | Report | 1× (yellow card) 7× (suspension) | Palais des Sports JF Krakowski, Saint-Raphaël; Attendance: 1,600; Referees: Yovchev, Yonchev (BUL) |

| 21 October 2025; 20:45 | Irudek Bidasoa Irún (Spain) | 32–33 | (Germany) SG Flensburg-Handewitt | Pabellón Polideportivo Artaleku, Irun; Attendance: 1,823; Referees: Backović, Palačković (SLO) |
| 21 October 2025; 20:45 | Nevado, García je 5 | (17–17) | Jakobsen 10 | Pabellón Polideportivo Artaleku, Irun; Attendance: 1,823; Referees: Backović, Palačković (SLO) |
| 21 October 2025; 20:45 | 4× (suspension) | Report | 1× (yellow card) 3× (suspension) | Pabellón Polideportivo Artaleku, Irun; Attendance: 1,823; Referees: Backović, Palačković (SLO) |

| 11 November 2025; 18:45 | AHC Potaissa Turda (Romania) | 26–33 | (Germany) SG Flensburg-Handewitt | Turda Arena, Turda; Attendance: 2,500; Referees: Maia, Nunes (POR) |
| 11 November 2025; 18:45 | Mošić, Dumitriu 5 | (13–18) | Jørgensen 5 | Turda Arena, Turda; Attendance: 2,500; Referees: Maia, Nunes (POR) |
| 11 November 2025; 18:45 | 1× (yellow card) 4× (suspension) | Report | 3× (suspension) | Turda Arena, Turda; Attendance: 2,500; Referees: Maia, Nunes (POR) |

| 11 November 2025; 20:45 | Saint-Raphaël Var Handball (France) | 35–32 | (Spain) Irudek Bidasoa Irún | Palais des Sports JF Krakowski, Saint-Raphaël; Attendance: 1,000; Referees: Jović, Arnautović (BIH) |
| 11 November 2025; 20:45 | Paschal 6 | (20–18) | Múgica 5 | Palais des Sports JF Krakowski, Saint-Raphaël; Attendance: 1,000; Referees: Jović, Arnautović (BIH) |
| 11 November 2025; 20:45 | 5× (suspension) | Report | 2× (yellow card) 8× (suspension) 1× (red card) | Palais des Sports JF Krakowski, Saint-Raphaël; Attendance: 1,000; Referees: Jović, Arnautović (BIH) |

| 18 November 2025; 20:45 | SG Flensburg-Handewitt (Germany) | 46–28 | (Romania) AHC Potaissa Turda | GP Joule Arena, Flensburg; Attendance: 2,718; Referees: Cipov, Klus (SVK) |
| 18 November 2025; 20:45 | Volz 10 | (22–15) | Veres 9 | GP Joule Arena, Flensburg; Attendance: 2,718; Referees: Cipov, Klus (SVK) |
| 18 November 2025; 20:45 | 4× (suspension) | Report | 1× (yellow card) 2× (suspension) | GP Joule Arena, Flensburg; Attendance: 2,718; Referees: Cipov, Klus (SVK) |

| 18 November 2025; 20:45 | Irudek Bidasoa Irún (Spain) | 33–25 | (France) Saint-Raphaël Var Handball | Pabellón Polideportivo Artaleku, Irun; Attendance: 1,578; Referees: Metalari, Nikolovski (MKD) |
| 18 November 2025; 20:45 | Mielczarski, García 6 | (16–11) | Paschal 8 | Pabellón Polideportivo Artaleku, Irun; Attendance: 1,578; Referees: Metalari, Nikolovski (MKD) |
| 18 November 2025; 20:45 | 1× (yellow card) 5× (suspension) | Report | 4× (suspension) | Pabellón Polideportivo Artaleku, Irun; Attendance: 1,578; Referees: Metalari, Nikolovski (MKD) |

| 25 November 2025; 18:45 | Saint-Raphaël Var Handball (France) | 29–36 | (Germany) SG Flensburg-Handewitt | Palais des Sports JF Krakowski, Saint-Raphaël; Attendance: 1,100; Referees: Antić, Jakovljević (SRB) |
| 25 November 2025; 18:45 | Mohamed 7 | (15–17) | Grgić 10 | Palais des Sports JF Krakowski, Saint-Raphaël; Attendance: 1,100; Referees: Antić, Jakovljević (SRB) |
| 25 November 2025; 18:45 | 4× (suspension) | Report | 4× (suspension) 1× (red card) | Palais des Sports JF Krakowski, Saint-Raphaël; Attendance: 1,100; Referees: Antić, Jakovljević (SRB) |

| 25 November 2025; 20:45 | Irudek Bidasoa Irún (Spain) | 35–30 | (Romania) AHC Potaissa Turda | Pabellón Polideportivo Artaleku, Irun; Attendance: 1,240; Referees: Praštalo, Balvan (BIH) |
| 25 November 2025; 20:45 | Múgica 10 | (17–16) | Ghivil 7 | Pabellón Polideportivo Artaleku, Irun; Attendance: 1,240; Referees: Praštalo, Balvan (BIH) |
| 25 November 2025; 20:45 | 8× (suspension) | Report | 2× (yellow card) 4× (suspension) | Pabellón Polideportivo Artaleku, Irun; Attendance: 1,240; Referees: Praštalo, Balvan (BIH) |

| 2 December 2025; 18:45 | SG Flensburg-Handewitt (Germany) | 38–35 | (Spain) Irudek Bidasoa Irún | GP Joule Arena, Flensburg; Attendance: 4,343; Referees: Borge, Nygren (NOR) |
| 2 December 2025; 18:45 | Golla 9 | (16–17) | Múgica 7 | GP Joule Arena, Flensburg; Attendance: 4,343; Referees: Borge, Nygren (NOR) |
| 2 December 2025; 18:45 | 1× (suspension) | Report | 1× (yellow card) 2× (suspension) 1× (red card) | GP Joule Arena, Flensburg; Attendance: 4,343; Referees: Borge, Nygren (NOR) |

| 2 December 2025; 18:45 | AHC Potaissa Turda (Romania) | 25–34 | (France) Saint-Raphaël Var Handball | Turda Arena, Turda; Attendance: 1,000; Referees: Pagh, Thygesen (DEN) |
| 2 December 2025; 18:45 | Thalmaier, Ghiță 5 | (11–19) | Mohamed 9 | Turda Arena, Turda; Attendance: 1,000; Referees: Pagh, Thygesen (DEN) |
| 2 December 2025; 18:45 | 1× (yellow card) 4× (suspension) | Report | 2× (suspension) | Turda Arena, Turda; Attendance: 1,000; Referees: Pagh, Thygesen (DEN) |

=== Group B ===
| Pos | Team | Pld | W | D | L | GF | GA | GD | Pts | Qualification | KIE | MON | OST | BRN |
|---|---|---|---|---|---|---|---|---|---|---|---|---|---|---|
| 1 | (Germany) THW Kiel | 6 | 6 | 0 | 0 | 196 | 146 | +50 | 12 | Main Round | — | 27–18 | 34–21 | 37–27 |
| 2 | (France) Montpellier Handball | 6 | 4 | 0 | 2 | 195 | 168 | +27 | 8 | Main Round | 28–30 | — | 37–26 | 37–29 |
| 3 | (Poland) KPR Ostrovia | 6 | 1 | 1 | 4 | 157 | 198 | −41 | 3 | | 25–33 | 25–38 | — | 32–28 |
| 4 | (Switzerland) BSV Bern | 6 | 0 | 1 | 5 | 170 | 206 | −36 | 1 | | 27–35 | 31–37 | 28–28 | — |

Source: EHF

| 14 October 2025; 18:45 | Montpellier Handball (France) | 28–30 | (Germany) THW Kiel | Sud de France Arena, Montpellier; Attendance: 6,000; Referees: Horváth, Marton (HUN) |
| 14 October 2025; 18:45 | Lenne, Richert 5 | (9–16) | Načinović 6 | Sud de France Arena, Montpellier; Attendance: 6,000; Referees: Horváth, Marton (HUN) |
| 14 October 2025; 18:45 | 1× (yellow card) 2× (suspension) | Report | 1× (yellow card) 4× (suspension) | Sud de France Arena, Montpellier; Attendance: 6,000; Referees: Horváth, Marton (HUN) |

| 14 October 2025; 20:45 | KPR Ostrovia (Poland) | 32–28 | (Switzerland) BSV Bern | Arena Ostrów, Ostrów Wielkopolski; Attendance: 2,514; Referees: Pukšič, Satler (SLO) |
| 14 October 2025; 20:45 | Burzak 8 | (18–14) | Wanner 8 | Arena Ostrów, Ostrów Wielkopolski; Attendance: 2,514; Referees: Pukšič, Satler (SLO) |
| 14 October 2025; 20:45 | 3× (suspension) | Report | 3× (suspension) | Arena Ostrów, Ostrów Wielkopolski; Attendance: 2,514; Referees: Pukšič, Satler (SLO) |

| 21 October 2025; 18:45 | THW Kiel (Germany) | 34–21 | (Poland) KPR Ostrovia | Wunderino Arena, Kiel; Attendance: 6,045; Referees: Pétursson, Þrastarson (ISL) |
| 21 October 2025; 18:45 | Ankermann, Bilyk 6 | (16–9) | Frankowski 6 | Wunderino Arena, Kiel; Attendance: 6,045; Referees: Pétursson, Þrastarson (ISL) |
| 21 October 2025; 18:45 | 1× (yellow card) 3× (suspension) | Report | 3× (suspension) | Wunderino Arena, Kiel; Attendance: 6,045; Referees: Pétursson, Þrastarson (ISL) |

| 21 October 2025; 18:45 | BSV Bern (Switzerland) | 31–37 | (France) Montpellier Handball | Mobiliar Arena, Gümligen; Attendance: 1,523; Referees: Borge, Nygren (NOR) |
| 21 October 2025; 18:45 | Wanner 10 | (18–21) | Simonet 8 | Mobiliar Arena, Gümligen; Attendance: 1,523; Referees: Borge, Nygren (NOR) |
| 21 October 2025; 18:45 | 6× (suspension) | Report | 1× (yellow card) 4× (suspension) | Mobiliar Arena, Gümligen; Attendance: 1,523; Referees: Borge, Nygren (NOR) |

| 11 November 2025; 18:45 | KPR Ostrovia (Poland) | 25–38 | (France) Montpellier Handball | Arena Ostrów, Ostrów Wielkopolski; Attendance: 2,500; Referees: Praštalo, Balvan (BIH) |
| 11 November 2025; 18:45 | Burzak 7 | (11–16) | Monte 7 | Arena Ostrów, Ostrów Wielkopolski; Attendance: 2,500; Referees: Praštalo, Balvan (BIH) |
| 11 November 2025; 18:45 | 2× (yellow card) 6× (suspension) | Report | 2× (suspension) | Arena Ostrów, Ostrów Wielkopolski; Attendance: 2,500; Referees: Praštalo, Balvan (BIH) |

| 11 November 2025; 20:45 | BSV Bern (Switzerland) | 27–35 | (Germany) THW Kiel | Mobiliar Arena, Gümligen; Attendance: 2,500; Referees: Antić, Jakovljević (SRB) |
| 11 November 2025; 20:45 | Wanner 9 | (16–18) | Ellefsen á Skipagøtu 9 | Mobiliar Arena, Gümligen; Attendance: 2,500; Referees: Antić, Jakovljević (SRB) |
| 11 November 2025; 20:45 | 1× (yellow card) 3× (suspension) | Report | 1× (yellow card) 2× (suspension) | Mobiliar Arena, Gümligen; Attendance: 2,500; Referees: Antić, Jakovljević (SRB) |

| 18 November 2025; 18:45 | THW Kiel (Germany) | 37–27 | (Switzerland) BSV Bern | Wunderino Arena, Kiel; Attendance: 8,061; Referees: Mikelic, Paradina (CRO) |
| 18 November 2025; 18:45 | Bence 10 | (19–14) | Kusio 8 | Wunderino Arena, Kiel; Attendance: 8,061; Referees: Mikelic, Paradina (CRO) |
| 18 November 2025; 18:45 | 3× (suspension) | Report | 3× (suspension) | Wunderino Arena, Kiel; Attendance: 8,061; Referees: Mikelic, Paradina (CRO) |

| 18 November 2025; 18:45 | Montpellier Handball (France) | 37–26 | (Poland) KPR Ostrovia | Palais des sports René-Bougnol, Montpellier; Attendance: 2,514; Referees: Pirvu, Potirniche (ROU) |
| 18 November 2025; 18:45 | Richert 6 | (21–13) | Kamyszek 5 | Palais des sports René-Bougnol, Montpellier; Attendance: 2,514; Referees: Pirvu, Potirniche (ROU) |
| 18 November 2025; 18:45 | 2× (suspension) | Report | 4× (suspension) 1× (red card) | Palais des sports René-Bougnol, Montpellier; Attendance: 2,514; Referees: Pirvu, Potirniche (ROU) |

| 25 November 2025; 20:45 | KPR Ostrovia (Poland) | 25–33 | (Germany) THW Kiel | Arena Ostrów, Ostrów Wielkopolski; Attendance: 2,107; Referees: Novykov (UKR), Gatelis (LTU) |
| 25 November 2025; 20:45 | Burzak 6 | (15–16) | four players 5 | Arena Ostrów, Ostrów Wielkopolski; Attendance: 2,107; Referees: Novykov (UKR), Gatelis (LTU) |
| 25 November 2025; 20:45 | 1× (yellow card) 3× (suspension) | Report | 1× (yellow card) 2× (suspension) | Arena Ostrów, Ostrów Wielkopolski; Attendance: 2,107; Referees: Novykov (UKR), Gatelis (LTU) |

| 25 November 2025; 20:45 | Montpellier Handball (France) | 37–29 | (Switzerland) BSV Bern | Palais des sports René-Bougnol, Montpellier; Attendance: 2,600; Referees: Maia, Nunes (POR) |
| 25 November 2025; 20:45 | Casado 8 | (24–17) | Eggimann 6 | Palais des sports René-Bougnol, Montpellier; Attendance: 2,600; Referees: Maia, Nunes (POR) |
| 25 November 2025; 20:45 | | Report | 4× (suspension) 1× (red card) | Palais des sports René-Bougnol, Montpellier; Attendance: 2,600; Referees: Maia, Nunes (POR) |

| 2 December 2025; 20:45 | THW Kiel (Germany) | 27–18 | (France) Montpellier Handball | Wunderino Arena, Kiel; Attendance: 5,533; Referees: Marín, García (ESP) |
| 2 December 2025; 20:45 | Ellefsen á Skipagøtu 6 | (14–11) | Monte 4 | Wunderino Arena, Kiel; Attendance: 5,533; Referees: Marín, García (ESP) |
| 2 December 2025; 20:45 | 1× (yellow card) 4× (suspension) | Report | 1× (yellow card) 3× (suspension) | Wunderino Arena, Kiel; Attendance: 5,533; Referees: Marín, García (ESP) |

| 2 December 2025; 20:45 | BSV Bern (Switzerland) | 28–28 | (Poland) KPR Ostrovia | Mobiliar Arena, Gümligen; Attendance: 834; Referees: Uhlir, Benus (CZE) |
| 2 December 2025; 20:45 | Wanner 7 | (13–15) | four player 4 | Mobiliar Arena, Gümligen; Attendance: 834; Referees: Uhlir, Benus (CZE) |
| 2 December 2025; 20:45 | 1× (yellow card) 3× (suspension) | Report | 1× (yellow card) 4× (suspension) | Mobiliar Arena, Gümligen; Attendance: 834; Referees: Uhlir, Benus (CZE) |

=== Group C ===
| Pos | Team | Pld | W | D | L | GF | GA | GD | Pts | Qualification | SAH | GRA | SLO | MIN |
|---|---|---|---|---|---|---|---|---|---|---|---|---|---|---|
| 1 | (Denmark) SAH - Skanderborg | 6 | 5 | 0 | 1 | 214 | 168 | +46 | 10 | Main Round | — | 28–29 | 34–30 | 39–26 |
| 2 | (Spain) Fraikin BM Granollers | 6 | 3 | 1 | 2 | 169 | 175 | −6 | 7 | Main Round | 26–31 | — | 27–35 | 29–28 |
| 3 | (Slovenia) RD LL Grosist Slovan | 6 | 2 | 0 | 4 | 181 | 189 | −8 | 4 | | 30–37 | 29–34 | — | 35–29 |
| 4 | (Romania) CS Minaur Baia Mare | 6 | 1 | 1 | 4 | 162 | 194 | −32 | 3 | | 27–45 | 24–24 | 28–22 | — |

Source: EHF

| 14 October 2025; 20:45 | RD LL Grosist Slovan (Slovenia) | 35–29 | (Romania) CS Minaur Baia Mare | Tivoli Hall, Ljubljana; Attendance: 700; Referees: Bozhinovski, Nachevski (MKD) |
| 14 October 2025; 20:45 | Ljevar 12 | (20–15) | Botea 7 | Tivoli Hall, Ljubljana; Attendance: 700; Referees: Bozhinovski, Nachevski (MKD) |
| 14 October 2025; 20:45 | 1× (yellow card) 3× (suspension) | Report | 3× (suspension) | Tivoli Hall, Ljubljana; Attendance: 700; Referees: Bozhinovski, Nachevski (MKD) |

| 14 October 2025; 20:45 | Fraikin BM Granollers (Spain) | 26–31 | (Denmark) SAH - Skanderborg | Palau d'Esports de Granollers, Granollers; Attendance: 1,203; Referees: Mandak, Rudinsky (SVK) |
| 14 October 2025; 20:45 | Franco i Miro, Palomino Morón 4 | (13–18) | Rasmussen 5 | Palau d'Esports de Granollers, Granollers; Attendance: 1,203; Referees: Mandak, Rudinsky (SVK) |
| 14 October 2025; 20:45 | 4× (suspension) | Report | 1× (yellow card) 4× (suspension) | Palau d'Esports de Granollers, Granollers; Attendance: 1,203; Referees: Mandak, Rudinsky (SVK) |

| 21 October 2025; 18:45 | SAH - Skanderborg (Denmark) | 34–30 | (Slovenia) RD LL Grosist Slovan | Djurslands Bank Arena, Aarhus; Attendance: 723; Referees: Brkic, Jusufhodzic (AUT) |
| 21 October 2025; 18:45 | Rasmussen 8 | (21–13) | Ljevar 12 | Djurslands Bank Arena, Aarhus; Attendance: 723; Referees: Brkic, Jusufhodzic (AUT) |
| 21 October 2025; 18:45 | 2× (suspension) | Report | 1× (yellow card) 4× (suspension) | Djurslands Bank Arena, Aarhus; Attendance: 723; Referees: Brkic, Jusufhodzic (AUT) |

| 21 October 2025; 18:45 | CS Minaur Baia Mare (Romania) | 24–24 | (Spain) Fraikin BM Granollers | Sala Polivalenta Lascar Pana, Baia Mare; Attendance: 2,200; Referees: Boricic, Markovic (SRB) |
| 21 October 2025; 18:45 | Nagy, Kotrč 5 | (8–11) | Fis Ballester 5 | Sala Polivalenta Lascar Pana, Baia Mare; Attendance: 2,200; Referees: Boricic, Markovic (SRB) |
| 21 October 2025; 18:45 | 2× (suspension) | Report | 2× (yellow card) 4× (suspension) | Sala Polivalenta Lascar Pana, Baia Mare; Attendance: 2,200; Referees: Boricic, Markovic (SRB) |

| 11 November 2025; 17:00 | CS Minaur Baia Mare (Romania) | 27–45 | (Denmark) SAH - Skanderborg | Sala Polivalenta Lascar Pana, Baia Mare; Attendance: 1,700; Referees: Sniurevicius, Grigalionis (LTU) |
| 11 November 2025; 17:00 | Botea 7 | (11–17) | Jensen 7 | Sala Polivalenta Lascar Pana, Baia Mare; Attendance: 1,700; Referees: Sniurevicius, Grigalionis (LTU) |
| 11 November 2025; 17:00 | 4× (suspension) | Report | 1× (yellow card) 3× (suspension) | Sala Polivalenta Lascar Pana, Baia Mare; Attendance: 1,700; Referees: Sniurevicius, Grigalionis (LTU) |

| 11 November 2025; 18:45 | RD LL Grosist Slovan (Slovenia) | 29–34 | (Spain) Fraikin BM Granollers | Tivoli Hall, Ljubljana; Attendance: 1,377; Referees: Bíró, Kiss (HUN) |
| 11 November 2025; 18:45 | Ljevar, Zobec 5 | (12–18) | Figueras 9 | Tivoli Hall, Ljubljana; Attendance: 1,377; Referees: Bíró, Kiss (HUN) |
| 11 November 2025; 18:45 | 3× (suspension) | Report | 1× (yellow card) 2× (suspension) | Tivoli Hall, Ljubljana; Attendance: 1,377; Referees: Bíró, Kiss (HUN) |

| 18 November 2025; 18:45 | SAH - Skanderborg (Denmark) | 39–26 | (Romania) CS Minaur Baia Mare | Djurslands Bank Arena, Aarhus; Attendance: 973; Referees: Cernavskis, Bogdanovs (LAT) |
| 18 November 2025; 18:45 | Hansen 9 | (18–15) | Pop 6 | Djurslands Bank Arena, Aarhus; Attendance: 973; Referees: Cernavskis, Bogdanovs (LAT) |
| 18 November 2025; 18:45 | 3× (suspension) | Report | 2× (suspension) | Djurslands Bank Arena, Aarhus; Attendance: 973; Referees: Cernavskis, Bogdanovs (LAT) |

| 18 November 2025; 20:45 | Fraikin BM Granollers (Spain) | 27–35 | (Slovenia) RD LL Grosist Slovan | Palau d'Esports de Granollers, Granollers; Attendance: 1,115; Referees: R. Thiyagarajah, S. Thiyagarajah (GER) |
| 18 November 2025; 20:45 | Urdangarin de Borbón 6 | (16–13) | Ljevar 11 | Palau d'Esports de Granollers, Granollers; Attendance: 1,115; Referees: R. Thiyagarajah, S. Thiyagarajah (GER) |
| 18 November 2025; 20:45 | 4× (suspension) | Report | 4× (suspension) | Palau d'Esports de Granollers, Granollers; Attendance: 1,115; Referees: R. Thiyagarajah, S. Thiyagarajah (GER) |

| 25 November 2025; 18:45 | SAH - Skanderborg (Denmark) | 28–29 | (Spain) Fraikin BM Granollers | Djurslands Bank Arena, Aarhus; Attendance: 1,443; Referees: Bozhinovski, Nachevski (MKD) |
| 25 November 2025; 18:45 | Lærke, Hansen 5 | (13–15) | Fis, Franco 6 | Djurslands Bank Arena, Aarhus; Attendance: 1,443; Referees: Bozhinovski, Nachevski (MKD) |
| 25 November 2025; 18:45 | 2× (suspension) | Report | 2× (suspension) | Djurslands Bank Arena, Aarhus; Attendance: 1,443; Referees: Bozhinovski, Nachevski (MKD) |

| 25 November 2025; 19:45 | CS Minaur Baia Mare (Romania) | 28–22 | (Slovenia) RD LL Grosist Slovan | Sala Polivalenta Lascar Pana, Baia Mare; Attendance: 1,500; Referees: Cipov, Klus (SVK) |
| 25 November 2025; 19:45 | Kotrč 7 | (13–9) | Miklavec 6 | Sala Polivalenta Lascar Pana, Baia Mare; Attendance: 1,500; Referees: Cipov, Klus (SVK) |
| 25 November 2025; 19:45 | 1× (yellow card) 5× (suspension) | Report | 3× (suspension) 1× (red card) | Sala Polivalenta Lascar Pana, Baia Mare; Attendance: 1,500; Referees: Cipov, Klus (SVK) |

| 2 December 2025; 20:45 | RD LL Grosist Slovan (Slovenia) | 30–37 | (Denmark) SAH - Skanderborg | Tivoli Hall, Ljubljana; Attendance: 503; Referees: Picard, Vauchez (FRA) |
| 2 December 2025; 20:45 | three players 4 | (12–16) | Lærke 8 | Tivoli Hall, Ljubljana; Attendance: 503; Referees: Picard, Vauchez (FRA) |
| 2 December 2025; 20:45 | 1× (suspension) | Report | 4× (suspension) | Tivoli Hall, Ljubljana; Attendance: 503; Referees: Picard, Vauchez (FRA) |

| 2 December 2025; 20:45 | Fraikin BM Granollers (Spain) | 29–28 | (Romania) CS Minaur Baia Mare | Palau d'Esports de Granollers, Granollers; Attendance: 670; Referees: Lončar, Lončar (CRO) |
| 2 December 2025; 20:45 | Urdangarin de Borbón 7 | (14–18) | Botea 7 | Palau d'Esports de Granollers, Granollers; Attendance: 670; Referees: Lončar, Lončar (CRO) |
| 2 December 2025; 20:45 | 1× (yellow card) 3× (suspension) 1× (red card) | Report | 1× (yellow card) 7× (suspension) | Palau d'Esports de Granollers, Granollers; Attendance: 670; Referees: Lončar, Lončar (CRO) |

=== Group D ===
| Pos | Team | Pld | W | D | L | GF | GA | GD | Pts | Qualification | POR | ELV | LUZ | FRA |
|---|---|---|---|---|---|---|---|---|---|---|---|---|---|---|
| 1 | (Portugal) FC Porto | 6 | 5 | 0 | 1 | 228 | 169 | +59 | 10 | Main Round | — | 29–31 | 44–31 | 44–30 |
| 2 | (Norway) Elverum Håndball | 6 | 4 | 0 | 2 | 198 | 179 | +19 | 8 | Main Round | 25–29 | — | 31–34 | 38–24 |
| 3 | (Switzerland) HC Kriens-Luzern | 6 | 3 | 0 | 3 | 200 | 213 | −13 | 6 | | 26–44 | 34–38 | — | 40–25 |
| 4 | (Iceland) Knattspyrnufélagið Fram | 6 | 0 | 0 | 6 | 165 | 230 | −65 | 0 | | 26–38 | 29–35 | 31–35 | — |

Source: EHF

| 14 October 2025; 20:45 | Knattspyrnufélagið Fram (Iceland) | 26–38 | (Portugal) FC Porto | Lambhagahöllin, Reykjavík; Attendance: 812; Referees: Kinnari, Skogberg (FIN) |
| 14 October 2025; 20:45 | Styrmisson 7 | (11–16) | Martínez Llamazares 7 | Lambhagahöllin, Reykjavík; Attendance: 812; Referees: Kinnari, Skogberg (FIN) |
| 14 October 2025; 20:45 | 3× (suspension) | Report | 2× (yellow card) 3× (suspension) | Lambhagahöllin, Reykjavík; Attendance: 812; Referees: Kinnari, Skogberg (FIN) |

| 14 October 2025; 20:45 | Elverum Håndball (Norway) | 31–34 | (Switzerland) HC Kriens-Luzern | Terningen Arena, Elverum; Attendance: 1,356; Referees: Picard, Vauchez (FRA) |
| 14 October 2025; 20:45 | Gulliksen 8 | (14–18) | Šipić, Langenick 8 | Terningen Arena, Elverum; Attendance: 1,356; Referees: Picard, Vauchez (FRA) |
| 14 October 2025; 20:45 | 3× (suspension) | Report | 1× (yellow card) 3× (suspension) | Terningen Arena, Elverum; Attendance: 1,356; Referees: Picard, Vauchez (FRA) |

| 21 October 2025; 20:45 | Knattspyrnufélagið Fram (Iceland) | 29–35 | (Norway) Elverum Håndball | Lambhagahöllin, Reykjavík; Attendance: 484; Referees: Kull, Tint (EST) |
| 21 October 2025; 20:45 | Kárason 7 | (19–19) | Péter 11 | Lambhagahöllin, Reykjavík; Attendance: 484; Referees: Kull, Tint (EST) |
| 21 October 2025; 20:45 | 1× (yellow card) 2× (suspension) | Report | 5× (suspension) | Lambhagahöllin, Reykjavík; Attendance: 484; Referees: Kull, Tint (EST) |

| 21 October 2025; 20:45 | FC Porto (Portugal) | 44–31 | (Switzerland) HC Kriens-Luzern | Pavilhao Dragão Arena, Porto; Attendance: 835; Referees: Pagh, Thygesen (DEN) |
| 21 October 2025; 20:45 | Costa 7 | (22–18) | Sigrist 10 | Pavilhao Dragão Arena, Porto; Attendance: 835; Referees: Pagh, Thygesen (DEN) |
| 21 October 2025; 20:45 | 2× (suspension) | Report | 2× (yellow card) 2× (suspension) 1× (red card) | Pavilhao Dragão Arena, Porto; Attendance: 835; Referees: Pagh, Thygesen (DEN) |

| 11 November 2025; 18:45 | HC Kriens-Luzern (Switzerland) | 40–25 | (Iceland) Knattspyrnufélagið Fram | Pilatus Arena, Kriens; Attendance: 1,300; Referees: Mandak, Rudinsky (SVK) |
| 11 November 2025; 18:45 | Bader 10 | (23–11) | Júlíusson 7 | Pilatus Arena, Kriens; Attendance: 1,300; Referees: Mandak, Rudinsky (SVK) |
| 11 November 2025; 18:45 | 1× (suspension) | Report | 1× (yellow card) 3× (suspension) | Pilatus Arena, Kriens; Attendance: 1,300; Referees: Mandak, Rudinsky (SVK) |

| 11 November 2025; 18:45 | Elverum Håndball (Norway) | 25–29 | (Portugal) FC Porto | Terningen Arena, Elverum; Attendance: 1,815; Referees: Novykov (UKR), Gatelis (LTU) |
| 11 November 2025; 18:45 | Soløst 6 | (12–14) | Gunnarsson 9 | Terningen Arena, Elverum; Attendance: 1,815; Referees: Novykov (UKR), Gatelis (LTU) |
| 11 November 2025; 18:45 | 3× (suspension) | Report | 1× (yellow card) 7× (suspension) | Terningen Arena, Elverum; Attendance: 1,815; Referees: Novykov (UKR), Gatelis (LTU) |

| 18 November 2025; 19:45 | FC Porto (Portugal) | 29–31 | (Norway) Elverum Håndball | Pavilhao Dragão Arena, Porto; Attendance: 684; Referees: Bozhinovski, Nachevski (MKD) |
| 18 November 2025; 19:45 | Diocou 6 | (19–16) | Péter 6 | Pavilhao Dragão Arena, Porto; Attendance: 684; Referees: Bozhinovski, Nachevski (MKD) |
| 18 November 2025; 19:45 | 5× (suspension) | Report | 3× (suspension) | Pavilhao Dragão Arena, Porto; Attendance: 684; Referees: Bozhinovski, Nachevski (MKD) |

| 18 November 2025; 19:45 | Knattspyrnufélagið Fram (Iceland) | 31–35 | (Switzerland) HC Kriens-Luzern | Lambhagahöllin, Reykjavík; Attendance: 362; Referees: Leszczynski, Piechota (POL) |
| 18 November 2025; 19:45 | Sigurðsson 8 | (16–19) | Sigrist 15 | Lambhagahöllin, Reykjavík; Attendance: 362; Referees: Leszczynski, Piechota (POL) |
| 18 November 2025; 19:45 | 1× (yellow card) | Report | 1× (suspension) | Lambhagahöllin, Reykjavík; Attendance: 362; Referees: Leszczynski, Piechota (POL) |

| 25 November 2025; 18:45 | HC Kriens-Luzern (Switzerland) | 34–38 | (Norway) Elverum Håndball | Pilatus Arena, Kriens; Attendance: 1,450; Referees: Jović, Arnautović (BIH) |
| 25 November 2025; 18:45 | Sigrist 12 | (19–20) | Gulliksen 10 | Pilatus Arena, Kriens; Attendance: 1,450; Referees: Jović, Arnautović (BIH) |
| 25 November 2025; 18:45 | 8× (suspension) | Report | 2× (yellow card) 4× (suspension) | Pilatus Arena, Kriens; Attendance: 1,450; Referees: Jović, Arnautović (BIH) |

| 25 November 2025; 19:45 | FC Porto (Portugal) | 44–30 | (Iceland) Knattspyrnufélagið Fram | Pavilhao Dragão Arena, Porto; Attendance: 599; Referees: Murariu, Paraschiv (ROM) |
| 25 November 2025; 19:45 | Martínez 10 | (23–10) | Ragnarsson 8 | Pavilhao Dragão Arena, Porto; Attendance: 599; Referees: Murariu, Paraschiv (ROM) |
| 25 November 2025; 19:45 | 3× (suspension) | Report | 3× (suspension) | Pavilhao Dragão Arena, Porto; Attendance: 599; Referees: Murariu, Paraschiv (ROM) |

| 2 December 2025; 18:45 | HC Kriens-Luzern (Switzerland) | 26–44 | (Portugal) FC Porto | Pilatus Arena, Kriens; Attendance: 1,390; Referees: Fält, Holm (SWE) |
| 2 December 2025; 18:45 | Sigrist, Oertli 4 | (11–23) | Martínez 7 | Pilatus Arena, Kriens; Attendance: 1,390; Referees: Fält, Holm (SWE) |
| 2 December 2025; 18:45 | 2× (suspension) | Report | 1× (suspension) | Pilatus Arena, Kriens; Attendance: 1,390; Referees: Fält, Holm (SWE) |

| 2 December 2025; 18:45 | Elverum Håndball (Norway) | 38–24 | (Iceland) Knattspyrnufélagið Fram | Terningen Arena, Elverum; Attendance: 1,626; Referees: Sîrbu, Serdiuc (MDA) |
| 2 December 2025; 18:45 | Gjerdalen, Gulliksen 6 | (23–11) | Stenlund 8 | Terningen Arena, Elverum; Attendance: 1,626; Referees: Sîrbu, Serdiuc (MDA) |
| 2 December 2025; 18:45 | 4× (suspension) | Report | 4× (suspension) | Terningen Arena, Elverum; Attendance: 1,626; Referees: Sîrbu, Serdiuc (MDA) |

=== Group E ===
| Pos | Team | Pld | W | D | L | GF | GA | GD | Pts | Qualification | MEL | BEN | FTC | KAR |
|---|---|---|---|---|---|---|---|---|---|---|---|---|---|---|
| 1 | (Germany) MT Melsungen | 6 | 6 | 0 | 0 | 180 | 163 | +17 | 12 | Main Round | — | 28–26 | 33–27 | 35–34 |
| 2 | (Portugal) SL Benfica | 6 | 3 | 0 | 3 | 191 | 181 | +10 | 6 (Note: SL Benfica 69–58 FTC-Green Collect) | Main Round | 26–30 | — | 38–25 | 36–33 |
| 3 | (Hungary) FTC-Green Collect | 6 | 3 | 0 | 3 | 173 | 190 | −17 | 6 | | 25–28 | 33–31 | — | 31–29 |
| 4 | (Sweden) HF Karlskrona | 6 | 0 | 0 | 6 | 184 | 194 | −10 | 0 | | 25–26 | 32–34 | 31–32 | — |

Source: EHF
Notes:

| 14 October 2025; 18:45 | MT Melsungen (Germany) | 28–26 | (Portugal) SL Benfica | Rothenbach-Halle, Kassel; Attendance: 2,967; Referees: Jović, Arnautović (BIH) |
| 14 October 2025; 18:45 | three players 4 | (14–12) | Vailupau 6 | Rothenbach-Halle, Kassel; Attendance: 2,967; Referees: Jović, Arnautović (BIH) |
| 14 October 2025; 18:45 | 1× (yellow card) 1× (suspension) | Report | 2× (suspension) | Rothenbach-Halle, Kassel; Attendance: 2,967; Referees: Jović, Arnautović (BIH) |

| 14 October 2025; 18:45 | FTC-Green Collect (Hungary) | 31–29 | (Sweden) HF Karlskrona | Érd Aréna, Érd; Attendance: 300; Referees: Sîrbu, Serdiuc (MDA) |
| 14 October 2025; 18:45 | Nagy 8 | (16–15) | Larsson, Jönsson 5 | Érd Aréna, Érd; Attendance: 300; Referees: Sîrbu, Serdiuc (MDA) |
| 14 October 2025; 18:45 | 4× (suspension) | Report | 3× (suspension) | Érd Aréna, Érd; Attendance: 300; Referees: Sîrbu, Serdiuc (MDA) |

| 21 October 2025; 20:45 | SL Benfica (Portugal) | 38–25 | (Hungary) FTC-Green Collect | Pavilhão da Luz Nº 2, Lisbon; Attendance: 201; Referees: Carmaux, Mursch (FRA) |
| 21 October 2025; 20:45 | Vailupau 7 | (18–16) | Nagy 9 | Pavilhão da Luz Nº 2, Lisbon; Attendance: 201; Referees: Carmaux, Mursch (FRA) |
| 21 October 2025; 20:45 | 2× (suspension) | Report | 1× (yellow card) 5× (suspension) | Pavilhão da Luz Nº 2, Lisbon; Attendance: 201; Referees: Carmaux, Mursch (FRA) |

| 21 October 2025; 20:45 | HF Karlskrona (Sweden) | 25–26 | (Germany) MT Melsungen | Brinova Arena, Karlskrona; Attendance: 1,709; Referees: Gasmi, Gasmi (FRA) |
| 21 October 2025; 20:45 | Larsson 6 | (14–18) | Enderleit 5 | Brinova Arena, Karlskrona; Attendance: 1,709; Referees: Gasmi, Gasmi (FRA) |
| 21 October 2025; 20:45 | 2× (suspension) | Report | 1× (yellow card) 2× (suspension) | Brinova Arena, Karlskrona; Attendance: 1,709; Referees: Gasmi, Gasmi (FRA) |

| 11 November 2025; 18:45 | MT Melsungen (Germany) | 33–27 | (Hungary) FTC-Green Collect | Rothenbach-Halle, Kassel; Attendance: 2,151; Referees: Kinnari, Skogberg (FIN) |
| 11 November 2025; 18:45 | Arnarsson 6 | (15–15) | Ancsin 7 | Rothenbach-Halle, Kassel; Attendance: 2,151; Referees: Kinnari, Skogberg (FIN) |
| 11 November 2025; 18:45 | 2× (suspension) | Report | 1× (yellow card) 4× (suspension) 1× (red card) | Rothenbach-Halle, Kassel; Attendance: 2,151; Referees: Kinnari, Skogberg (FIN) |

| 11 November 2025; 20:45 | HF Karlskrona (Sweden) | 32–34 | (Portugal) SL Benfica | Brinova Arena, Karlskrona; Attendance: 1,475; Referees: Mitrevski, Todorovski (MKD) |
| 11 November 2025; 20:45 | Larsson 6 | (18–18) | Sánchez-Migallón 7 | Brinova Arena, Karlskrona; Attendance: 1,475; Referees: Mitrevski, Todorovski (MKD) |
| 11 November 2025; 20:45 | 1× (yellow card) 5× (suspension) | Report | 1× (yellow card) 4× (suspension) | Brinova Arena, Karlskrona; Attendance: 1,475; Referees: Mitrevski, Todorovski (MKD) |

| 18 November 2025; 18:45 | FTC-Green Collect (Hungary) | 25–28 | (Germany) MT Melsungen | Érd Aréna, Érd; Attendance: 1,000; Referees: Bolic, Hurich (AUT) |
| 18 November 2025; 18:45 | Nagy 6 | (10–14) | Ntanzi 5 | Érd Aréna, Érd; Attendance: 1,000; Referees: Bolic, Hurich (AUT) |
| 18 November 2025; 18:45 | 4× (suspension) | Report | 2× (suspension) | Érd Aréna, Érd; Attendance: 1,000; Referees: Bolic, Hurich (AUT) |

| 18 November 2025; 20:45 | SL Benfica (Portugal) | 36–33 | (Sweden) HF Karlskrona | Pavilhão da Luz Nº 2, Lisbon; Attendance: 447; Referees: Barysas, Petrusis (LTU) |
| 18 November 2025; 20:45 | Rodríguez 12 | (18–13) | Larsson 6 | Pavilhão da Luz Nº 2, Lisbon; Attendance: 447; Referees: Barysas, Petrusis (LTU) |
| 18 November 2025; 20:45 | 2× (suspension) | Report | 1× (yellow card) 4× (suspension) 1× (red card) | Pavilhão da Luz Nº 2, Lisbon; Attendance: 447; Referees: Barysas, Petrusis (LTU) |

| 25 November 2025; 18:45 | MT Melsungen (Germany) | 35–34 | (Sweden) HF Karlskrona | Rothenbach-Halle, Kassel; Attendance: 3,015; Referees: Pukšič, Satler (SLO) |
| 25 November 2025; 18:45 | Marchán 7 | (18–15) | Stenberg, Hansson 7 | Rothenbach-Halle, Kassel; Attendance: 3,015; Referees: Pukšič, Satler (SLO) |
| 25 November 2025; 18:45 | | Report | 2× (suspension) | Rothenbach-Halle, Kassel; Attendance: 3,015; Referees: Pukšič, Satler (SLO) |

| 25 November 2025; 18:45 | FTC-Green Collect (Hungary) | 33–31 | (Portugal) SL Benfica | Érd Aréna, Érd; Attendance: 400; Referees: Peretz, Schwartz (ISR) |
| 25 November 2025; 18:45 | Nagy, Ancsin 8 | (13–14) | Taboada 9 | Érd Aréna, Érd; Attendance: 400; Referees: Peretz, Schwartz (ISR) |
| 25 November 2025; 18:45 | 4× (suspension) | Report | 1× (suspension) | Érd Aréna, Érd; Attendance: 400; Referees: Peretz, Schwartz (ISR) |

| 2 December 2025; 20:45 | SL Benfica (Portugal) | 26–30 | (Germany) MT Melsungen | Pavilhão da Luz Nº 2, Lisbon; Attendance: 412; Referees: Leszczynski, Piechota (POL) |
| 2 December 2025; 20:45 | Taboada 9 | (11–13) | Enderleit 8 | Pavilhão da Luz Nº 2, Lisbon; Attendance: 412; Referees: Leszczynski, Piechota (POL) |
| 2 December 2025; 20:45 | 1× (suspension) | Report | 4× (suspension) | Pavilhão da Luz Nº 2, Lisbon; Attendance: 412; Referees: Leszczynski, Piechota (POL) |

| 2 December 2025; 20:45 | HF Karlskrona (Sweden) | 31–32 | (Hungary) FTC-Green Collect | Brinova Arena, Karlskrona; Attendance: 1,027; Referees: Vitaku, Vitaku (KOS) |
| 2 December 2025; 20:45 | three players 6 | (12–14) | Nagy 8 | Brinova Arena, Karlskrona; Attendance: 1,027; Referees: Vitaku, Vitaku (KOS) |
| 2 December 2025; 20:45 | 1× (yellow card) 3× (suspension) | Report | 1× (yellow card) 2× (suspension) | Brinova Arena, Karlskrona; Attendance: 1,027; Referees: Vitaku, Vitaku (KOS) |

=== Group F ===
| Pos | Team | Pld | W | D | L | GF | GA | GD | Pts | Qualification | VAR | KRI | SEV | FEN |
|---|---|---|---|---|---|---|---|---|---|---|---|---|---|---|
| 1 | (North Macedonia) HC Vardar 1961 | 6 | 5 | 0 | 1 | 203 | 176 | +27 | 10 | Main Round | — | 35–30 | 34–29 | 37–35 |
| 2 | (Sweden) IFK Kristianstad | 6 | 4 | 1 | 1 | 186 | 179 | +7 | 9 | Main Round | 32–31 | — | 28–27 | 34–26 |
| 3 | (Croatia) MRK Sesvete | 6 | 2 | 1 | 3 | 181 | 195 | −14 | 5 | | 24–38 | 32–32 | — | 32–31 |
| 4 | (France) Fenix Toulouse | 6 | 0 | 0 | 6 | 178 | 198 | −20 | 0 | | 26–28 | 28–30 | 32–37 | — |

Source: EHF

| 14 October 2025; 18:45 | HC Vardar 1961 (North Macedonia) | 34–29 | (Croatia) MRK Sesvete | Jane Sandanski Arena, Skopje; Attendance: 2,500; Referees: Novykov (UKR), Gatelis (LTU) |
| 14 October 2025; 18:45 | Horiha 7 | (19–15) | Raužan 9 | Jane Sandanski Arena, Skopje; Attendance: 2,500; Referees: Novykov (UKR), Gatelis (LTU) |
| 14 October 2025; 18:45 | 1× (yellow card) 2× (suspension) | Report | 1× (suspension) | Jane Sandanski Arena, Skopje; Attendance: 2,500; Referees: Novykov (UKR), Gatelis (LTU) |

| 14 October 2025; 20:45 | Fenix Toulouse (France) | 28–30 | (Sweden) IFK Kristianstad | Palais des Sports Andre Brouat, Toulouse; Attendance: 1,600; Referees: Murariu, Paraschiv (ROM) |
| 14 October 2025; 20:45 | Ilić 10 | (11–15) | Månsson 9 | Palais des Sports Andre Brouat, Toulouse; Attendance: 1,600; Referees: Murariu, Paraschiv (ROM) |
| 14 October 2025; 20:45 | 5× (suspension) 1× (red card) | Report | 5× (suspension) | Palais des Sports Andre Brouat, Toulouse; Attendance: 1,600; Referees: Murariu, Paraschiv (ROM) |

| 21 October 2025; 18:45 | MRK Sesvete (Croatia) | 32–32 | (Sweden) IFK Kristianstad | High school Jelkovec, Zagreb; Attendance: 1,320; Referees: Cipov, Klus (SVK) |
| 21 October 2025; 18:45 | Svržnjak 7 | (13–15) | Selin 8 | High school Jelkovec, Zagreb; Attendance: 1,320; Referees: Cipov, Klus (SVK) |
| 21 October 2025; 18:45 | 2× (yellow card) 2× (suspension) | Report | 1× (yellow card) 5× (suspension) | High school Jelkovec, Zagreb; Attendance: 1,320; Referees: Cipov, Klus (SVK) |

| 21 October 2025; 18:45 | Fenix Toulouse (France) | 26–28 | (North Macedonia) HC Vardar 1961 | Palais des Sports Andre Brouat, Toulouse; Attendance: 2,200; Referees: Simone, Monitillo (ITA) |
| 21 October 2025; 18:45 | Ilić 7 | (11–18) | Malus 6 | Palais des Sports Andre Brouat, Toulouse; Attendance: 2,200; Referees: Simone, Monitillo (ITA) |
| 21 October 2025; 18:45 | 3× (suspension) | Report | 1× (yellow card) 4× (suspension) | Palais des Sports Andre Brouat, Toulouse; Attendance: 2,200; Referees: Simone, Monitillo (ITA) |

| 11 November 2025; 18:45 | MRK Sesvete (Croatia) | 32–31 | (France) Fenix Toulouse | High school Jelkovec, Zagreb; Attendance: 2,000; Referees: Fotakidis, Kinatzidis (GRE) |
| 11 November 2025; 18:45 | Raužan 6 | (18–15) | Ilić 11 | High school Jelkovec, Zagreb; Attendance: 2,000; Referees: Fotakidis, Kinatzidis (GRE) |
| 11 November 2025; 18:45 | 1× (yellow card) 2× (suspension) | Report | 2× (suspension) | High school Jelkovec, Zagreb; Attendance: 2,000; Referees: Fotakidis, Kinatzidis (GRE) |

| 11 November 2025; 18:45 | IFK Kristianstad (Sweden) | 32–31 | (North Macedonia) HC Vardar 1961 | Kristianstad Arena, Kristianstad; Attendance: 2,987; Referees: Brkic, Jusufhodzic (AUT) |
| 11 November 2025; 18:45 | Månsson 13 | (14–11) | Horiha 8 | Kristianstad Arena, Kristianstad; Attendance: 2,987; Referees: Brkic, Jusufhodzic (AUT) |
| 11 November 2025; 18:45 | 5× (suspension) | Report | 5× (suspension) | Kristianstad Arena, Kristianstad; Attendance: 2,987; Referees: Brkic, Jusufhodzic (AUT) |

| 18 November 2025; 18:45 | HC Vardar 1961 (North Macedonia) | 35–30 | (Sweden) IFK Kristianstad | Jane Sandanski Arena, Skopje; Attendance: 2,920; Referees: I. Covalciuc, A. Covalciuc (MDA) |
| 18 November 2025; 18:45 | Horiha 9 | (17–16) | Månsson 9 | Jane Sandanski Arena, Skopje; Attendance: 2,920; Referees: I. Covalciuc, A. Covalciuc (MDA) |
| 18 November 2025; 18:45 | 1× (suspension) | Report | 1× (yellow card) 2× (suspension) | Jane Sandanski Arena, Skopje; Attendance: 2,920; Referees: I. Covalciuc, A. Covalciuc (MDA) |

| 18 November 2025; 20:45 | Fenix Toulouse (France) | 32–37 | (Croatia) MRK Sesvete | Palais des Sports Andre Brouat, Toulouse; Attendance: 2,000; Referees: Kristof, Marton (HUN) |
| 18 November 2025; 20:45 | Ilić 8 | (18–18) | Svržnjak 10 | Palais des Sports Andre Brouat, Toulouse; Attendance: 2,000; Referees: Kristof, Marton (HUN) |
| 18 November 2025; 20:45 | 3× (suspension) | Report | 1× (yellow card) 5× (suspension) | Palais des Sports Andre Brouat, Toulouse; Attendance: 2,000; Referees: Kristof, Marton (HUN) |

| 25 November 2025; 20:45 | IFK Kristianstad (Sweden) | 34–26 | (France) Fenix Toulouse | Kristianstad Arena, Kristianstad; Attendance: 2,070; Referees: Sniurevicius, Grigalionis (LTU) |
| 25 November 2025; 20:45 | Selin 8 | (15–15) | Giraudeau, Jovičić 5 | Kristianstad Arena, Kristianstad; Attendance: 2,070; Referees: Sniurevicius, Grigalionis (LTU) |
| 25 November 2025; 20:45 | 4× (suspension) | Report | 6× (suspension) 1× (red card) | Kristianstad Arena, Kristianstad; Attendance: 2,070; Referees: Sniurevicius, Grigalionis (LTU) |

| 25 November 2025; 20:45 | MRK Sesvete (Croatia) | 24–38 | (North Macedonia) HC Vardar 1961 | High school Jelkovec, Zagreb; Attendance: 2,270; Referees: Aghakishi, Aghakishi (AZE) |
| 25 November 2025; 20:45 | Dumenčić 5 | (12–23) | Mitrović 7 | High school Jelkovec, Zagreb; Attendance: 2,270; Referees: Aghakishi, Aghakishi (AZE) |
| 25 November 2025; 20:45 | 3× (suspension) | Report | 2× (yellow card) 2× (suspension) | High school Jelkovec, Zagreb; Attendance: 2,270; Referees: Aghakishi, Aghakishi (AZE) |

| 2 December 2025; 18:45 | IFK Kristianstad (Sweden) | 28–27 | (Croatia) MRK Sesvete | Kristianstad Arena, Kristianstad; Attendance: 2,857; Referees: Horváth, Marton (HUN) |
| 2 December 2025; 18:45 | Stenmalm 7 | (15–11) | Dumenčić 7 | Kristianstad Arena, Kristianstad; Attendance: 2,857; Referees: Horváth, Marton (HUN) |
| 2 December 2025; 18:45 | 3× (suspension) | Report | 1× (yellow card) 1× (suspension) 1× (red card) | Kristianstad Arena, Kristianstad; Attendance: 2,857; Referees: Horváth, Marton (HUN) |

| 2 December 2025; 18:45 | HC Vardar 1961 (North Macedonia) | 37–35 | (France) Fenix Toulouse | Jane Sandanski Arena, Skopje; Attendance: 2,076; Referees: Cernavskis, Bogdanovs (LAT) |
| 2 December 2025; 18:45 | Malus 9 | (16–18) | Feuchtmann 7 | Jane Sandanski Arena, Skopje; Attendance: 2,076; Referees: Cernavskis, Bogdanovs (LAT) |
| 2 December 2025; 18:45 | 4× (suspension) | Report | 3× (suspension) | Jane Sandanski Arena, Skopje; Attendance: 2,076; Referees: Cernavskis, Bogdanovs (LAT) |

=== Group G ===
| Pos | Team | Pld | W | D | L | GF | GA | GD | Pts | Qualification | HAN | FRE | SAV | TAT |
|---|---|---|---|---|---|---|---|---|---|---|---|---|---|---|
| 1 | (Germany) TSV Hannover-Burgdorf | 6 | 5 | 0 | 1 | 196 | 173 | +23 | 10 | Main Round | — | 31–34 | 27–25 | 40–28 |
| 2 | (Denmark) Fredericia HK | 6 | 3 | 1 | 2 | 193 | 181 | +12 | 7 | Main Round | 29–31 | — | 29–33 | 38–30 |
| 3 | (Sweden) IK Sävehof | 6 | 2 | 2 | 2 | 178 | 173 | +5 | 6 | | 28–30 | 29–29 | — | 33–28 |
| 4 | (Slovakia) Tatran Prešov | 6 | 0 | 1 | 5 | 172 | 212 | −40 | 1 | | 29–37 | 27–34 | 30–30 | — |

Source: EHF

| 14 October 2025; 18:45 | Tatran Prešov (Slovakia) | 30–30 | (Sweden) IK Sävehof | Tatran Handball Arena, Prešov; Attendance: 1,850; Referees: Praštalo, Balvan (BIH) |
| 14 October 2025; 18:45 | Hernandez 7 | (18–13) | Spante, Grøtta 6 | Tatran Handball Arena, Prešov; Attendance: 1,850; Referees: Praštalo, Balvan (BIH) |
| 14 October 2025; 18:45 | 6× (suspension) 1× (red card) | Report | 3× (suspension) | Tatran Handball Arena, Prešov; Attendance: 1,850; Referees: Praštalo, Balvan (BIH) |

| 14 October 2025; 18:45 | Fredericia HK (Denmark) | 29–31 | (Germany) TSV Hannover-Burgdorf | Middelfart Sparekasse Arena, Fredericia; Attendance: 1,675; Referees: Jerlecki, Labun (POL) |
| 14 October 2025; 18:45 | Kjeldgaard Andersen 9 | (11–15) | Fischer 6 | Middelfart Sparekasse Arena, Fredericia; Attendance: 1,675; Referees: Jerlecki, Labun (POL) |
| 14 October 2025; 18:45 | 1× (yellow card) 1× (suspension) 1× (red card) | Report | 2× (suspension) | Middelfart Sparekasse Arena, Fredericia; Attendance: 1,675; Referees: Jerlecki, Labun (POL) |

| 21 October 2025; 18:45 | TSV Hannover-Burgdorf (Germany) | 40–28 | (Slovakia) Tatran Prešov | Swiss Life Hall, Hannover; Attendance: 2,512; Referees: Vitaku, Vitaku (KOS) |
| 21 October 2025; 18:45 | Weber 6 | (22–15) | Bogdanic 6 | Swiss Life Hall, Hannover; Attendance: 2,512; Referees: Vitaku, Vitaku (KOS) |
| 21 October 2025; 18:45 | 2× (yellow card) 2× (suspension) | Report | 1× (yellow card) 3× (suspension) | Swiss Life Hall, Hannover; Attendance: 2,512; Referees: Vitaku, Vitaku (KOS) |

| 21 October 2025; 18:45 | IK Sävehof (Sweden) | 29–29 | (Denmark) Fredericia HK | Partille Arena, Partille; Attendance: 1,164; Referees: Metalari, Nikolovski (MKD) |
| 21 October 2025; 18:45 | Grøtta 7 | (12–14) | Kjeldgaard Andersen 12 | Partille Arena, Partille; Attendance: 1,164; Referees: Metalari, Nikolovski (MKD) |
| 21 October 2025; 18:45 | 3× (suspension) | Report | 1× (yellow card) 5× (suspension) | Partille Arena, Partille; Attendance: 1,164; Referees: Metalari, Nikolovski (MKD) |

| 11 November 2025; 18:45 | Tatran Prešov (Slovakia) | 27–34 | (Denmark) Fredericia HK | Tatran Handball Arena, Prešov; Attendance: 2,754; Referees: Cindrić, Gonzurek (CRO) |
| 11 November 2025; 18:45 | Karlov 7 | (15–13) | Bisgaard, Kjeldgaard Andersen 9 | Tatran Handball Arena, Prešov; Attendance: 2,754; Referees: Cindrić, Gonzurek (CRO) |
| 11 November 2025; 18:45 | 1× (yellow card) 2× (suspension) | Report | 2× (suspension) | Tatran Handball Arena, Prešov; Attendance: 2,754; Referees: Cindrić, Gonzurek (CRO) |

| 11 November 2025; 20:45 | TSV Hannover-Burgdorf (Germany) | 27–25 | (Sweden) IK Sävehof | Swiss Life Hall, Hannover; Attendance: 2,013; Referees: Vešović, Mitrović (MNE) |
| 11 November 2025; 20:45 | Pedersen 7 | (15–12) | Vedelsbøl 5 | Swiss Life Hall, Hannover; Attendance: 2,013; Referees: Vešović, Mitrović (MNE) |
| 11 November 2025; 20:45 | 4× (suspension) | Report | 1× (yellow card) 4× (suspension) | Swiss Life Hall, Hannover; Attendance: 2,013; Referees: Vešović, Mitrović (MNE) |

| 18 November 2025; 18:45 | IK Sävehof (Sweden) | 28–30 | (Germany) TSV Hannover-Burgdorf | Partille Arena, Partille; Attendance: 1,086; Referees: Boricic, Markovic (SRB) |
| 18 November 2025; 18:45 | Durlanu 11 | (13–13) | Uscins 5 | Partille Arena, Partille; Attendance: 1,086; Referees: Boricic, Markovic (SRB) |
| 18 November 2025; 18:45 | 6× (suspension) | Report | 2× (yellow card) 7× (suspension) | Partille Arena, Partille; Attendance: 1,086; Referees: Boricic, Markovic (SRB) |

| 18 November 2025; 20:45 | Fredericia HK (Denmark) | 38–30 | (Slovakia) Tatran Prešov | Middelfart Sparekasse Arena, Fredericia; Attendance: 925; Referees: Sirbu, Serdiuc (MDA) |
| 18 November 2025; 20:45 | Mossestad 9 | (17–14) | Dobrkovič 8 | Middelfart Sparekasse Arena, Fredericia; Attendance: 925; Referees: Sirbu, Serdiuc (MDA) |
| 18 November 2025; 20:45 | 1× (yellow card) 4× (suspension) | Report | 1× (yellow card) 4× (suspension) | Middelfart Sparekasse Arena, Fredericia; Attendance: 925; Referees: Sirbu, Serdiuc (MDA) |

| 25 November 2025; 18:45 | IK Sävehof (Sweden) | 33–28 | (Slovakia) Tatran Prešov | Partille Arena, Partille; Attendance: 843; Referees: Stark, Ştefan (ROM) |
| 25 November 2025; 18:45 | Persson 11 | (15–16) | Dobrkovič 8 | Partille Arena, Partille; Attendance: 843; Referees: Stark, Ştefan (ROM) |
| 25 November 2025; 18:45 | 4× (suspension) | Report | 5× (suspension) | Partille Arena, Partille; Attendance: 843; Referees: Stark, Ştefan (ROM) |

| 25 November 2025; 20:45 | TSV Hannover-Burgdorf (Germany) | 31–34 | (Denmark) Fredericia HK | Swiss Life Hall, Hannover; Attendance: 2,301; Referees: Oyarzun, Zaragueta (ESP) |
| 25 November 2025; 20:45 | Uscins, Pedersen 7 | (16–17) | Kjeldgaard Andersen, Andersson Moberg 6 | Swiss Life Hall, Hannover; Attendance: 2,301; Referees: Oyarzun, Zaragueta (ESP) |
| 25 November 2025; 20:45 | 2× (suspension) | Report | 2× (suspension) | Swiss Life Hall, Hannover; Attendance: 2,301; Referees: Oyarzun, Zaragueta (ESP) |

| 2 December 2025; 18:45 | Tatran Prešov (Slovakia) | 29–37 | (Germany) TSV Hannover-Burgdorf | Tatran Handball Arena, Prešov; Attendance: 1,631; Referees: Panayides, Andreou (CYP) |
| 2 December 2025; 18:45 | Dobrkovič 8 | (16–22) | Fischer, Weber 6 | Tatran Handball Arena, Prešov; Attendance: 1,631; Referees: Panayides, Andreou (CYP) |
| 2 December 2025; 18:45 | 5× (suspension) | Report | 1× (yellow card) 6× (suspension) | Tatran Handball Arena, Prešov; Attendance: 1,631; Referees: Panayides, Andreou (CYP) |

| 2 December 2025; 18:45 | Fredericia HK (Denmark) | 29–33 | (Sweden) IK Sävehof | Middelfart Sparekasse Arena, Fredericia; Attendance: 1,876; Referees: Pirvu, Potirniche (ROU) |
| 2 December 2025; 18:45 | Ljungquist 8 | (15–17) | Jónsson, Sandberg 7 | Middelfart Sparekasse Arena, Fredericia; Attendance: 1,876; Referees: Pirvu, Potirniche (ROU) |
| 2 December 2025; 18:45 | 1× (yellow card) 1× (suspension) | Report | 1× (yellow card) 2× (suspension) 1× (red card) | Middelfart Sparekasse Arena, Fredericia; Attendance: 1,876; Referees: Pirvu, Potirniche (ROU) |

=== Group H ===
| Pos | Team | Pld | W | D | L | GF | GA | GD | Pts | Qualification | NEX | KAD | PAR | ADE |
|---|---|---|---|---|---|---|---|---|---|---|---|---|---|---|
| 1 | (Croatia) RK Nexe | 6 | 3 | 1 | 2 | 175 | 169 | +6 | 7 | Main Round | — | 29–30 | 30–22 | 29–28 |
| 2 | (Switzerland) Kadetten Schaffhausen | 6 | 3 | 0 | 3 | 176 | 161 | +15 | 6 (Note: Kadetten Schaffhausen 58–48 RK Partizan) | Main Round | 31–32 | — | 32–19 | 30–22 |
| 3 | (Serbia) RK Partizan | 6 | 3 | 0 | 3 | 147 | 162 | −15 | 6 | | 30–27 | 29–26 | — | 25–18 |
| 4 | (Spain) Abanca Ademar León | 6 | 2 | 1 | 3 | 155 | 161 | −6 | 5 | | 28–28 | 30–27 | 29–22 | — |

Source: EHF
Notes:

| 14 October 2025; 18:45 | Kadetten Schaffhausen (Switzerland) | 30–22 | (Spain) Abanca Ademar León | BBC-Arena, Schaffhausen; Attendance: 1,257; Referees: Vešović, Mitrović (MNE) |
| 14 October 2025; 18:45 | Ríkharðsson 9 | (15–11) | Miñambres Calvo 5 | BBC-Arena, Schaffhausen; Attendance: 1,257; Referees: Vešović, Mitrović (MNE) |
| 14 October 2025; 18:45 | 1× (yellow card) 4× (suspension) | Report | 1× (yellow card) 5× (suspension) | BBC-Arena, Schaffhausen; Attendance: 1,257; Referees: Vešović, Mitrović (MNE) |

| 14 October 2025; 20:45 | RK Nexe (Croatia) | 30–22 | (Serbia) RK Partizan | OS Kralja Tomislava, Našice; Attendance: 1,980; Referees: Stark, Ştefan (ROM) |
| 14 October 2025; 20:45 | Lučin 9 | (16–8) | Mićić 5 | OS Kralja Tomislava, Našice; Attendance: 1,980; Referees: Stark, Ştefan (ROM) |
| 14 October 2025; 20:45 | 1× (yellow card) 7× (suspension) | Report | 3× (suspension) | OS Kralja Tomislava, Našice; Attendance: 1,980; Referees: Stark, Ştefan (ROM) |

| 21 October 2025; 18:45 | RK Partizan (Serbia) | 29–26 | (Switzerland) Kadetten Schaffhausen | Sportski centar Voždovac, Belgrade; Attendance: 0 Referees: Uhlir, Benus (CZE) |
| 21 October 2025; 18:45 | Crnoglavac 11 | (15–11) | Meister, Ríkharðsson 6 | Sportski centar Voždovac, Belgrade; Attendance: 0 Referees: Uhlir, Benus (CZE) |
| 21 October 2025; 18:45 | 4× (suspension) | Report | 1× (yellow card) 7× (suspension) 1× (red card) | Sportski centar Voždovac, Belgrade; Attendance: 0 Referees: Uhlir, Benus (CZE) |

| 21 October 2025; 20:45 | Abanca Ademar León (Spain) | 28–28 | (Croatia) RK Nexe | Palacio de los Deportes de León, Léon; Attendance: 1,885; Referees: Sniurevicius, Grigalionis (LTU) |
| 21 October 2025; 20:45 | four players 4 | (12–13) | Lučin 11 | Palacio de los Deportes de León, Léon; Attendance: 1,885; Referees: Sniurevicius, Grigalionis (LTU) |
| 21 October 2025; 20:45 | 1× (suspension) | Report | 1× (yellow card) 5× (suspension) | Palacio de los Deportes de León, Léon; Attendance: 1,885; Referees: Sniurevicius, Grigalionis (LTU) |

| 11 November 2025; 18:45 | RK Partizan (Serbia) | 25–18 | (Spain) Abanca Ademar León | Sportski centar Voždovac, Belgrade; Attendance: 0 Referees: Jerlecki, Labun (POL) |
| 11 November 2025; 18:45 | Popovic 7 | (13–8) | Sanz De Nicolas 5 | Sportski centar Voždovac, Belgrade; Attendance: 0 Referees: Jerlecki, Labun (POL) |
| 11 November 2025; 18:45 | 4× (suspension) | Report | 1× (yellow card) 4× (suspension) | Sportski centar Voždovac, Belgrade; Attendance: 0 Referees: Jerlecki, Labun (POL) |

| 11 November 2025; 20:45 | RK Nexe (Croatia) | 29–30 | (Switzerland) Kadetten Schaffhausen | OS Kralja Tomislava, Našice; Attendance: 1,500; Referees: Gasmi, Gasmi (FRA) |
| 11 November 2025; 20:45 | Cenić 7 | (12–16) | Maros 9 | OS Kralja Tomislava, Našice; Attendance: 1,500; Referees: Gasmi, Gasmi (FRA) |
| 11 November 2025; 20:45 | 1× (yellow card) 4× (suspension) | Report | 4× (suspension) | OS Kralja Tomislava, Našice; Attendance: 1,500; Referees: Gasmi, Gasmi (FRA) |

| 18 November 2025; 18:45 | Kadetten Schaffhausen (Switzerland) | 31–32 | (Croatia) RK Nexe | BBC-Arena, Schaffhausen; Attendance: 1,532; Referees: Erdogan, Özdeniz (TUR) |
| 18 November 2025; 18:45 | Ríkharðsson 8 | (15–15) | Moslavac 6 | BBC-Arena, Schaffhausen; Attendance: 1,532; Referees: Erdogan, Özdeniz (TUR) |
| 18 November 2025; 18:45 | 5× (suspension) | Report | 1× (yellow card) 5× (suspension) | BBC-Arena, Schaffhausen; Attendance: 1,532; Referees: Erdogan, Özdeniz (TUR) |

| 18 November 2025; 20:45 | Abanca Ademar León (Spain) | 29–22 | (Serbia) RK Partizan | Palacio de los Deportes de León, León; Attendance: 1,360; Referees: Borge, Nygren (NOR) |
| 18 November 2025; 20:45 | G. Pérez Arce 9 | (11–11) | Crnoglavac 9 | Palacio de los Deportes de León, León; Attendance: 1,360; Referees: Borge, Nygren (NOR) |
| 18 November 2025; 20:45 | 1× (yellow card) 5× (suspension) | Report | 1× (yellow card) 6× (suspension) 1× (red card) | Palacio de los Deportes de León, León; Attendance: 1,360; Referees: Borge, Nygren (NOR) |

| 25 November 2025; 18:45 | RK Partizan (Serbia) | 30–27 | (Croatia) RK Nexe | Sportski centar Voždovac, Belgrade; Attendance: 1,600; Referees: Nygaard, Primdahl (DEN) |
| 25 November 2025; 18:45 | Crnoglavac 8 | (15–12) | Moslavac, Cenić 5 | Sportski centar Voždovac, Belgrade; Attendance: 1,600; Referees: Nygaard, Primdahl (DEN) |
| 25 November 2025; 18:45 | 1× (yellow card) 5× (suspension) | Report | 4× (suspension) | Sportski centar Voždovac, Belgrade; Attendance: 1,600; Referees: Nygaard, Primdahl (DEN) |

| 25 November 2025; 20:45 | Abanca Ademar León (Spain) | 30–27 | (Switzerland) Kadetten Schaffhausen | Palacio de los Deportes de León, León; Attendance: 2,104; Referees: Backović, Palačković (SLO) |
| 25 November 2025; 20:45 | Sanz De Nicolas 7 | (14–14) | Pietrasik 8 | Palacio de los Deportes de León, León; Attendance: 2,104; Referees: Backović, Palačković (SLO) |
| 25 November 2025; 20:45 | 2× (yellow card) 2× (suspension) | Report | 1× (yellow card) 4× (suspension) | Palacio de los Deportes de León, León; Attendance: 2,104; Referees: Backović, Palačković (SLO) |

| 2 December 2025; 20:45 | Kadetten Schaffhausen (Switzerland) | 32–19 | (Serbia) RK Partizan | BBC-Arena, Schaffhausen; Attendance: 2,021; Referees: Fotakidis, Kinatzidis (GRE) |
| 2 December 2025; 20:45 | Pietrasik 9 | (13–8) | Crnoglavac, Šotić 4 | BBC-Arena, Schaffhausen; Attendance: 2,021; Referees: Fotakidis, Kinatzidis (GRE) |
| 2 December 2025; 20:45 | 1× (yellow card) 6× (suspension) 1× (red card) | Report | 1× (yellow card) 2× (suspension) | BBC-Arena, Schaffhausen; Attendance: 2,021; Referees: Fotakidis, Kinatzidis (GRE) |

| 2 December 2025; 20:45 | RK Nexe (Croatia) | 29–28 | (Spain) Abanca Ademar León | OS Kralja Tomislava, Našice; Attendance: 1,970; Referees: Brkic, Jusufhodzic (AUT) |
| 2 December 2025; 20:45 | Cenić 9 | (13–15) | Benites Quost 6 | OS Kralja Tomislava, Našice; Attendance: 1,970; Referees: Brkic, Jusufhodzic (AUT) |
| 2 December 2025; 20:45 | 2× (suspension) | Report | 1× (yellow card) 3× (suspension) | OS Kralja Tomislava, Našice; Attendance: 1,970; Referees: Brkic, Jusufhodzic (AUT) |
