= Ragot =

Ragot is a surname. Notable people with this surname include:

- Audrey Cordon-Ragot (born 1989), French road bicycle racer
- Emmeline Ragot (born 1986), French former professional downhill mountain biker
- Pierre-Yves Ragot (born 1986), French handball player
