= CS Minaur Baia Mare (men's handball) =

Romanian handball team

- Full name: Club Sportiv Minaur Baia Mare
- Short name: Minaur
- Founded: 1974; 52 years ago
- Arena: Sala Sporturilor Lascăr Pană
- Capacity: 2,048 seats
- Head coach: Nuno Miguel de Melo Farelo
- League: Liga Națională
- 2024–25: Liga Națională, 4th of 14
- Club colours
Home	Away

Club Sportiv Minaur Baia Mare, commonly known as Minaur Baia Mare or simply Minaur, is a Romanian handball team based in Baia Mare, Maramureș County.

Location of CS Minaur Baia Mare

== History ==
The team was founded on 15 May 1974 as Handball Club Minaur Baia Mare, becoming the first sports club in the country to specialize exclusively in handball. Its name, meaning 'Gold Mine,' refers to the gold mines around Baia Mare.

From the very beginning, Minaur has played exclusively in the first division of the Romanian handball championship. In the early years, they wore golden jerseys.

Minaur won its first Romanian Handball Cup in the 1977–78 season. In 1978–79, they reached the semi-finals of the EHF Cup Winners' Cup undefeated, with two victories, before being eliminated by SC Magdeburg. They finished as runners-up in the 1979–80 and 1980–81 seasons.

In 1980–81, they once again reached the semi-finals of the EHF Cup Winners' Cup but were eliminated by TuS Nettelstedt. During this period, Minaur was the only non-urban team in the Romanian league to compete internationally, often performing better than the Bucharest clubs.

In 1985, Minaur achieved Romania’s first international handball success by defeating the Soviet team ZTR Zaporizhzhia in the final of the EHF Cup. They repeated this triumph in 1988.

Twenty-four years after its founding, in 1998, the dream of every Baia Mare handball fan came true: HC Minaur became the champion of Romania! The following year, in 1999, they defended their title, becoming champions again. Their most recent championship win came in 2015.

Additionally, Minaur reached the semi-finals of the EHF Cup Winners' Cup in 1979, 1981, and 1986.

== Crest, colours, supporters ==
=== Kit manufacturers ===
Period	Kit manufacturer
2017	(Denmark) Hummel
2017 - 2018	(United States) Nike
2018 - 2019	(Germany) Erima
2019 - present	(Denmark) Hummel

=== Kits ===
HOME
2016–17	2017-18	2019–20	2020–21	2021–23

AWAY
2016–17	2017-18	2019–20	2020–21	2021–22	2022–23

THIRD
2017-18	2018–19	2020–21	2021-22

== Team ==
=== Current squad ===
Squad for the 2025–26 season

CS Minaur Baia Mare

Goalkeepers

- 1 (Ukraine) Anton Terekhov
- 12 (Romania) Sîncu Cristian
- 16 (Romania) Sergiu Makaria

Left Wingers

- 15 (Czech Republic) Milan Kotrč
- 52 (Romania) Lucas Sabou

Right Wingers

- 9 (Romania) David Pavlov
- 5 (Romania) David Moldovan

Line Players

- 3 (Romania) Robert Nagy
- 98 (Egypt) Mohamed Aly ismail Zeinelabedin

Left Backs

- 6 (Romania) Tudor Botea
- 10 (Romania) Gabriel Cumpănici
- 51 (Romania) Viorel Fotache

Central Backs

- 7 (Romania) Mario Racolța
- 35 (Romania) Erik Pop
- 43 (Serbia) (Croatia) Stefan Vujić

Right Backs

- 4 (Romania) Cosmin Stanciu
- 44 (Brazil) Anderson Mollino

=== Technical staff ===
- Head Coach: (Romania) Nuno Miguel de Melo Farelo
- Fitness Coach: (Romania) Vlad Pop

=== Transfers ===
Transfers for the 2026–27 season

Joining

- (Bosnia and Herzegovina) Edin Klis (LB) from (Romania) HC Buzău
- (Spain) Mamadou Diocou (RW) from (Portugal) FC Porto
- (Sweden) Hugo Forsberg (CB) from (Sweden) Önnereds HK
- (Norway) Kristian Turmo Lornstad (LP) from (Norway) Halden Topphåndball
- (Romania) Barna Buzogány (GK) from (Romania) CSM Sighişoara

Leaving

- (Serbia) (Croatia) Stefan Vujić (CB) to (Romania) CS Universitatea Cluj
- (Ukraine) Anton Terekhov (GK) to (Romania) SCM Politehnica Timișoara
- (Brazil) Anderson Mollino (RB) to (Romania) CSM Constanța
- (Romania) Gabriel Cumpănici (LB) to (Romania) CSM Constanța

=== Transfer History ===
Transfers for the 2025–26 season

Joining

- (Romania) David Pavlov (RW) from (Romania) CSM Focșani
- (Romania) Cosmin Stanciu (RB) from (Romania) CS Dinamo București

Leaving

- (Czech Republic) Tomáš Číp (RW) to (Romania) CS Universitatea Cluj
- (Ukraine) Ivan Burzak (LP) to (Poland) KPR Ostrovia
- (Sweden) Hayder Al-Khafadji (GK) to (Sweden) IFK Kristianstad
- (Sweden) Marcus Dahlin (RB) to (Portugal) Porto

== Accomplishments ==
=== Domestic ===
- Liga Națională:
  - Gold: 1998, 1999, 2015
  - Silver: 1980, 1981, 1985, 1992, 1993, 1994, 1995,2022,2023
  - Bronze: 1974, 1975, 1976, 1978, 1982, 1983, 1984, 1987, 1988, 1989, 1990, 1996, 1997, 2003, 2004, 2005, 2024
- Cupa României:
  - Winners: 1978, 1983, 1984, 1989, 1999, 2015
  - Finalists: 1985, 2023

=== International ===
- EHF Cup:
  - Winners: 1985, 1988
- EHF European Cup:
  - Runners up: 2022
- EHF Cup Winners' Cup:
  - Semifinalists: 1979, 1981, 1986

== European record ==
=== EHF Cup and EHF European League ===
CS Minaur Baia Mare was founded in 1974 and made its debut in European competitions in the 1978–79 season.

Season	Competition	Round	Club	Home	Away	Aggregate / position
1984–85	IHF Cup	R32	(Turkey) İTÜ Istanbul	45–17	41–23	86–40
1984–85	IHF Cup	R16	(Denmark) Helsingør IF	32–25	26–19	58–44
1984–85	IHF Cup	QF	(Czechoslovakia) Lokomotíva Trnava	37–22	32–29	69–51
1984–85	IHF Cup	SF	(Austria) WAT Margareten	37–19	28–25	65–44
1984–85	IHF Cup	F	(Soviet Union) SII Zaporizhzhia	22–17	14–18	36–35
1987–88	IHF Cup	R32	(Czechoslovakia) HT Tatran Prešov	32–21	26–21	58–42
1987–88	IHF Cup	R16	(Sweden) HK Drott	28–18	19–29	47–47 (a)
1987–88	IHF Cup	QF	(Denmark) Hellerup IK Copenhagen	24–16	20–25	44–41
1987–88	IHF Cup	SF	(Spain) FC Barcelona	24–22	21–22	45–44
1987–88	IHF Cup	F	(Soviet Union) Granitas Kaunas	23–20	20–21	43–41
1978–79	EHF Cup Winners' Cup	Preliminary round	(Israel) Maccabi Arazim Ramat Gan	22–11	26–16	48–27
1978–79	EHF Cup Winners' Cup	R16	(Denmark) Aalborg HK	31–19	24–21	55–40
1978–79	EHF Cup Winners' Cup	QF	(Germany) TV Hüttenberg	24–19	23–22	47–41
1978–79	EHF Cup Winners' Cup	SF	(East Germany) SC Magdeburg	26–22	19–27	45–49
1980–81	EHF Cup Winners' Cup	Preliminary round	(Israel) Hapoel Rehovot	27–19	27–15	54–34
1980–81	EHF Cup Winners' Cup	R16	(Denmark) Helsingør IF	Opponent disqualified		Qualified
1980–81	EHF Cup Winners' Cup	SF	(Germany) TuS Nettelstedt			Eliminated
2002–03	EHF Challenge Cup	R3	(Lithuania) Üla Varėna	33–27	27–21	60–48
2002–03	EHF Challenge Cup	R4	(Greece) Filippos Verias	25–32	25–35	50–67
2003–04	EHF Challenge Cup	R3	(Belarus) SKAF Minsk	31–26	34–23	65–49
2003–04	EHF Challenge Cup	R16	(North Macedonia) RK Jug-Zegin Skopje	43–35	45–33	88–68
2003–04	EHF Challenge Cup	QF	(Romania) HCM Constanța	28–28	29–35	57–63
2004–05	EHF Challenge Cup	R3	(Ukraine) Politechnic Olkom Donetsk	40–32	38–28	78–60
2004–05	EHF Challenge Cup	R16	(Luxembourg) Red Boys Differdange	42–27	41–25	83–52
2004–05	EHF Challenge Cup	QF	(Portugal) ABC Braga	31–27	22–32	53–59
2005–06	EHF Cup	R3	(France) US Créteil Handball	21–32	31–32	52–64
2015–16	EHF Champions League	Group D	(Denmark) Skjern Håndbold	28–28	28–32	5th
2015–16	EHF Champions League	Group D	(Ukraine) Motor Zaporizhzhia	35–30	23–25	5th
2015–16	EHF Champions League	Group D	(Switzerland) Kadetten Schaffhausen	31–31	23–24	5th
2015–16	EHF Champions League	Group D	(Norway) Elverum Håndball	24–29	28–28	5th
2015–16	EHF Champions League	Group D	(North Macedonia) Metalurg Skopje	21–20	23–21	5th
2020–21	EHF European Cup	R3	(Cyprus) Parnassos Strovolou	29–24	28–25	57–49
2020–21	EHF European Cup	R16	(Ukraine) HC Donbas	34–26	24–23	58–49
2020–21	EHF European Cup	QF	(Cyprus) Anorthosis Famagusta	22–27	23–18	45–45 (a)
2021–22	EHF European Cup	R1	(Bulgaria) HC Lokomotiv Gorna Oryahovitsa	44–22	33–21	77–43
2021–22	EHF European Cup	R2	(Israel) Hapoel SP Ashdod	35–32	33–29	68–61
2021–22	EHF European Cup	R3	(Serbia) Partizan	28–23	26–30	54–53
2021–22	EHF European Cup	R16	(Greece) PAOK	32–21	27–28	59–49
2021–22	EHF European Cup	QF	(Belarus) HC Victor	10–0	—N/a	10–0
2021–22	EHF European Cup	SF	(Sweden) Alingsås HK	34–28	28–31	62–59
2021–22	EHF European Cup	F	(Norway) Nærbø IL	26–27	25–29	51–56
2022–23	EHF European League	Q1	(Hungary) Ferencváros	27–36	22–38	49–74
2023–24	EHF European Cup	R2	(Ukraine) HC Odesa	52–26	39–27	91–53
2023–24	EHF European Cup	R3	(Serbia) HC Dinamo Pančevo	33–23	25–29	58–52
2023–24	EHF European Cup	R16	(Bosnia and Herzegovina) RK Vogošća	36–26	34–25	70–51
2023–24	EHF European Cup	QF	(Austria) Bregenz Handball	37–31	28–30	65–61
2023–24	EHF European Cup	SF	(Iceland) Valur	24–30	28–36	52–66
2024–25	EHF European Cup	R2	(Turkey) Beykoz BLD SK	44–30	47–39	91–69
2024–25	EHF European Cup	R3	(Kosovo) KH Rahoveci	35–40	38–31	73–71
2024–25	EHF European Cup	R16	(Finland) BK-46	33–30	31–32	64–62
2024–25	EHF European Cup	QF	(North Macedonia) HC Alkaloid	31–31	25–32	56–63
2025–26	EHF European League	Q1	(Iceland) Stjarnan	26–26	27–26	53–52
2025–26	EHF European League	Group C	(Spain) Fraikin BM Granollers	24–24	28–29	4th
2025–26	EHF European League	Group C	(Slovenia) RD LL Grosist Slovan	28–22	29–35	4th
2025–26	EHF European League	Group C	(Denmark) SAH Aarhus	27–45	26–39	4th

=== EHF ranking ===
As of 5/12/2025

Rank	Team	Points
32	(North Macedonia) RK Alkaloid	143
33	(Switzerland) HC Kriens-Luzern	140
34	(Romania) CS Minaur Baia Mare	139
35	(Sweden) IK Savehof	139
36	(Bosnia and Herzegovina) RK Izviđač	138
37	(Germany) Rhein-Neckar Löwen	137
38	(Norway) Elverum Håndball	131

== Former club members ==
=== Notable former players ===
- (Romania) Ionuț Ciobanu (2019–2021)
- (Romania) Gheorghe Covaciu (1980–1989)
- (Romania) Alexandru Csepreghi (2004–2007, 2018–)
- (Romania) Ștefan Birtalan (1967–1970)
- (Romania) Iosif Boroș (1977–1987)
- (Romania) Viorel Fotache (2007–2015, 2022–)
- (Romania) Valentin Ghionea (2003–2005)
- (Romania) Radu Ghiță (2015)
- (Romania) Petru Pop (1992–1999, 2006–2010, 2011–2012)
- (Romania) Răzvan Pop (2005–2016, 2017–)
- (Romania) Ionuț Ramba (2015, 2020-2021)
- (Romania) Marius Sadoveac (2014–2016)
- (Romania) Alin Șania (2000–2003)
- (Romania) Maricel Voinea (1977–1989)
- (Angola) Gabriel Teca (2021–)
- (Bosnia and Herzegovina) Ivan Karačić (2015–2016)
- (Bosnia and Herzegovina) Ivan Milas (2014–2015)
- (Brazil) Anderson Mollino (2021–)
- (Brazil) José Toledo (2020–2021)
- (Chile) Patricio Martínez (2014–2015)
- (Croatia) Teo Čorić (2019–2020)
- (Croatia) Antonio Pribanić (2015–2016)
- (Czech Republic) Tomáš Číp (2019-)
- (Czech Republic) Milan Kotrč (2019-)
- (France) Pierre-Yves Ragot (2017–2018)
- (Hungary) (Serbia) Nikola Eklemović (2014–2015)
- (Hungary) Tamás Iváncsik (2015–2016)
- (Hungary) Péter Tatai (2014–2016)
- (Hungary) (Serbia) Uroš Vilovski (2015–2016, 2018)
- (Montenegro) Stevan Vujović (2021–)
- (Russia) Inal Aflitulin (2015)
- (Spain) Cristian Malmagro (2014–2015)
- (Serbia) Miloš Dragaš (2017-2018)
- (Serbia) (Croatia) Stefan Vujić (2021-)
- (Ukraine) Artem Kozakevych (2022–)
- (Ukraine) Vladyslav Ostroushko (2015–2016)
- (Ukraine) Anton Terekhov (2021–)
