= Anton Terekhov =

Anton Terekhov may refer to:

- Anton Terekhov (footballer)
- Anton Terekhov (handballer)
