= Marcus Dahlin =

Swedish handball player (born 1991)

Personal information
- Nationality: Swedish
- Born: 29 May 1991 (age 35) Stenungsund, Sweden
- Height: 2.03 m (6 ft 8 in)

Sport
- Sport: Handball
- Position: Right Back
- Current club: CS Minaur Baia Mare

Senior clubs
- Years: Team
- –2009: Stenungsund HK
- 2009–2013: Alingsås HK
- 2013–2014: TMS Ringsted
- 2014–2015: ØIF Arendal
- 2015–2016: IFK Kristianstad
- 2016–2020: Mors-Thy Håndbold
- 2020–2022: Sønderjyske
- 2022–2024: Ribe-Esbjerg HH
- 2024–: CS Minaur Baia Mare
National team
Years	Team	Apps	(Gls)
2013–2017	Sweden	15	(15)

Marcus Dahlin (born 29 May 1991) is a Swedish handball player, who plays for CS Minaur Baia Mare.
