= Soumaoro =

Soumaoro is a name. Notable people with the name include:

- Adama Soumaoro (born 1992), French footballer
- Brem Soumaoro (born 1996), Liberian footballer
- Soumaoro Kanté (fl. 13th century), king of Sosso

== See also ==
- Soumaré
