= Ionuț Ciobanu =

Romanian handball player (born 1984)

Personal information
- Full name: Ionuț Ciobanu
- Nationality: Romanian
- Born: 23 September 1984 (age 42) Bucharest, Romania
- Height: 2.01 m (6 ft 7 in)

Sport
- Sport: Handball
- Position: Goalkeeper
- Current club: CS Minaur Baia Mare
- Number: 16

Senior clubs
- Years: Team
- 2005–2010: Steaua București
- 2010–2011: Energia Pandurii Târgu Jiu
- 2011: CSM București
- 2011–2012: Toledo BM
- 2012–2014: HC Odorhei
- 2014–2016: Mulhouse HSA
- 2016–2019: CSM București
- 2019–present: CS Minaur Baia Mare
National team
- Years: Team
- –: Romania

Ionuț Ciobanu (born 23 September 1984 Bucharest) is a Romanian handballer.

== International honours ==
- EHF Challenge Cup:
  - Winner: 2019
- EHF Cup Winners' Cup:
  - Semifinalist: 2010
- EHF Challenge Cup:
  - Winner: 2006
- IHF World Men's Handball Championship:

2011
