= Pierre-Yves Ragot =

French handball player (born 1986)

Personal information
- Nationality: French
- Born: 14 May 1986 (age 40) Nancy, France
- Height: 1.88 m (6 ft 2 in)

Sport
- Sport: Handball
- Position: Centre back / Left back

Senior clubs
- Years: Team
- 2003–2004: (France) Nancy Handball
- 2004–2006: (France) Ajaccio HB
- 2006–2007: (France) USAM Nîmes
- 2007–2011: (France) Nancy Handball
- 2011–2012: (Spain) SCDR Anaitasuna
- 2012–2013: (France) Billère Handball
- 2013–2014: (Austria) Union Leoben
- 2014–2017: (Romania) Dinamo București
- 2017-2018: (Romania) HC Minaur Baia Mare
- 8-10/2018: (France) Pontault-Combault Handball
- 2019–2020: (Romania) CSM Făgăraș
- 2020–2021: (Luxembourg) Handball Käerjeng

Pierre-Yves Ragot (born 14 May 1986) is a French handball player.

In 2020, he spent two weeks in jail as he was accused to be a drug dealer. He then confessed that he has been abused as a child.

== Achievements ==
- Liga Națională:
  - Gold Medalist: 2016
- Supercupa României:
  - Winner: 2016
