= Anton Terekhov (handballer) =

Ukrainian handball player

Personal information
- Nationality: Ukrainian
- Born: 28 July 1992 (age 34) Slovianoserbsk, Ukraine
- Height: 1.94 m (6 ft 4 in)

Sport
- Sport: Handball
- Position: Goalkeeper
- Current club: CS Minaur Baia Mare
- Number: 12

Senior clubs
- Years: Team
- -2015: HC Portovik
- 2015-2016: HC Kehra
- 2016-: HC Motor Zaporizhzhia
- 2021-: CS Minaur Baia Mare
National team
Years	Team	Apps	(Gls)
–	Ukraine	20	(1)
- Updated on January 2026

Anton Terekhov (born 28 July 1992) is a Ukrainian handball player for CS Minaur Baia Mare and the Ukrainian national team.

He represented Ukraine at the 2020 European Men's Handball Championship.
