= Adama Soumaré =

French-Burundian footballer (born 1982)

Personal information
- Full name: Adamé Soumaré
- Date of birth: 12 May 1982 (age 44)
- Place of birth: Meudon-la-Forêt, France
- Height: 1.84 m (6 ft 0 in)
- Position: Defender

Youth career
- 2000–2003: Le Havre AC

Senior career*
Years	Team	Apps	(Gls)
2003–2010	Le Havre AC	80	(2)
2009	→ Vannes (loan)	2	(0)
2011–2012	Cannes	18	(1)
- * Club domestic league appearances and goals as of 21:43, 4 February 2018 (UTC)

Adama Soumaré (born 12 May 1982) is a retired French-Burundian footballer who played as a defender.

== Career ==
Soumaré began his career in 2000 with Le Havre AC and was loaned out to Vannes on 7 January 2009.

== Personal life ==
Adama is the younger brother of Abdoulaye Soumaré and the elder brother of Elhadji Yaya Soumaré, who plays in the CFA from Le Havre AC.
