= Abdoulaye Soumaré =

French-Burundian footballer (born 1980)

Personal information
- Date of birth: 7 November 1980 (age 45)
- Place of birth: Saint-Ouen, France
- Height: 1.78 m (5 ft 10 in)
- Position: Striker

Team information
- Current team: UR Namur
- Number: 27

Youth career
- –2002: Red Star 93

Senior career*
Years	Team	Apps	(Gls)
2000–2002	Red Star 93	28	(7)
2002–2004	R.F.C. de Liège	57	(26)
2005	R.E. Mouscron	3	(0)
2005–2006	K.S.V. Roeselare	25	(2)
2006–2007	R.F.C. de Liège	2	(0)
2007–2008	R.E. Virton	14	(5)
2008–	UR Namur	14	(2)
- * Club domestic league appearances and goals as of 09:12, 19 December 2008 (UTC)

Abdoulaye Soumaré (born 7 November 1980) is a French-Burundian striker currently playing for UR Namur.

== Personal ==
Abdoulaye is the elder brother of Adama Soumaré and Elhadji Yaya Soumaré, who plays in the CFA from Le Havre AC.
