= Milan Kotrč =

Czech handball player

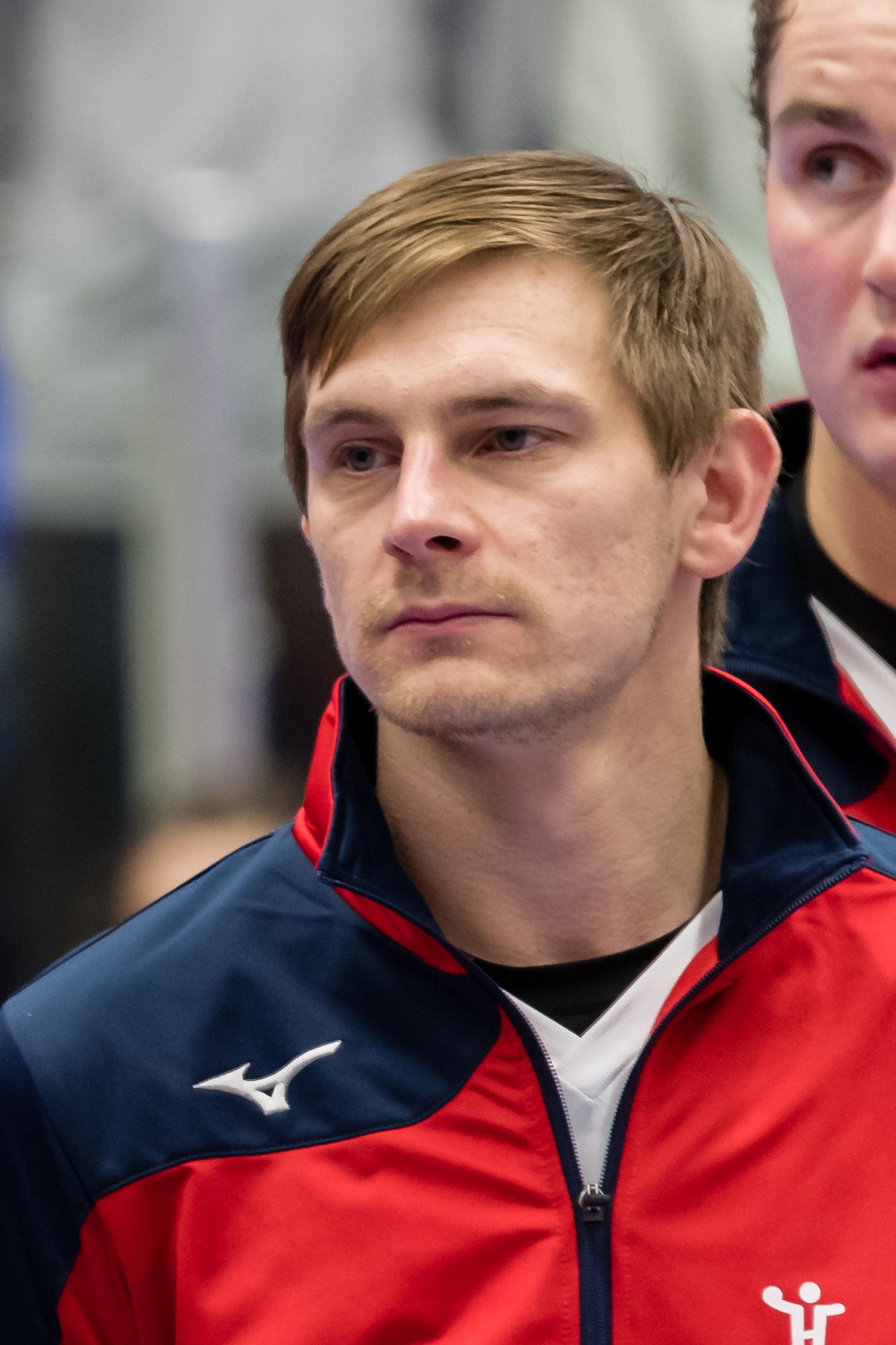

Personal information
- Nationality: Czech
- Born: 23 May 1988 (age 38) Prague, Czechoslovakia
- Height: 1.89 m (6 ft 2 in)

Sport
- Sport: Handball
- Position: Left wing
- Current club: Minaur Baia Mare
National team
Years	Team	Apps	(Gls)
–	Czech Republic	40	(52)

Milan Kotrč (born 23 May 1988) is a Czech handball player for Minaur Baia Mare and the Czech national team. He previously played for Bergischer HC.

He participated at the 2018 European Men's Handball Championship.
