= Moussa Soumaré =

French footballer (born 1997)

Personal information
- Date of birth: 6 September 1997 (age 29)
- Place of birth: Paris, France
- Height: 1.86 m (6 ft 1 in)
- Position: Right-back

Youth career
- 2008–2009: Championnet Sports
- 2010–2012: Espérance Paris 19
- 2012–2015: Red Star

Senior career*
Years	Team	Apps	(Gls)
2015–2016	Nuorese	17	(2)
2016–2017	Virtus Bergamo	16	(3)
2017–2018	Chiasso	26	(4)
2018–2019	Châteauroux B	10	(1)
2018–2019	Châteauroux	2	(0)
2020–2021	Carbonia	15	(1)
2022	Saluzzo	3	(0)
- * Club domestic league appearances and goals as of 23:02, 24 September 2022 (UTC)

Moussa Soumaré (born 6 September 1997) is a French professional footballer who plays as a right-back.

Born in France, Soumaré is of Malian descent. He played for the youth team of Red Star, before representing Nuorese, Virtus Bergamo, Chiasso, LB Châteauroux, Carbonia and Saluzzo as a senior.
