= Mamadou Diocou =

Spanish handball player (born 2000)

Personal information
- Full name: Mamadou Lamine Diocou Soumare
- Nationality: Spanish
- Born: 10 March 2000 (age 26) Fassada, Senegal
- Height: 1.82 m (6 ft 0 in)

Sport
- Sport: Handball
- Position: Right wing/back
- Current club: FC Porto
- Number: 19

Youth career
- Years: Team
- –: Club Deportivo Iplacea
- –: FC Barcelona

Senior clubs
- Years: Team
- 2018–: FC Barcelona
- 2021–2022: → Rhein-Neckar Löwen (loan)
- 2022: → Logroño La Rioja (loan)
- 2023–: → FC Porto (loan)

Mamadou Lamine Diocou Soumare (born 10 February 2000) is a handball player who plays for FC Porto.

Born in Senegal, he moved to Spain when he was 9 years old, and played as a kid for Club Deportivo Iplacea. He then moved on to FC Barcelona's youth system, working his way up to joining the senior club team in 2018. In 2021 it was announced he is leaving on a loan to Rhein-Neckar Löwen for two years.

He has participated in the Spanish youth and junior national teams.
