= Sweden at the 2012 Summer Olympics =

- IOC code: SWE
- NOC: Swedish Olympic Committee
- Website: www.sok.se (in Swedish and English)

in London
- Competitors: 134 in 20 sports
- Flag bearers: Rolf-Göran Bengtsson (opening); Fredrik Lööf (closing)
- Medals Ranked 37th: Gold 1 Silver 4 Bronze 3 Total 8

Summer Olympics appearances (overview)
- 1896; 1900; 1904; 1908; 1912; 1920; 1924; 1928; 1932; 1936; 1948; 1952; 1956; 1960; 1964; 1968; 1972; 1976; 1980; 1984; 1988; 1992; 1996; 2000; 2004; 2008; 2012; 2016; 2020; 2024; 2028

Other related appearances
- 1906 Intercalated Games

Sweden competed at the 2012 Summer Olympics in London, from 25 July to 12 August 2012. Swedish athletes have competed at every edition of the Summer Olympic Games in the modern era, except for the 1904 Summer Olympics in St. Louis. The Swedish Olympic Committee (Swedish: Sveriges Olympiska Kommitté, SOK) sent a total of 134 athletes to the Games, 55 men and 79 women, to compete in 20 sports. For the second consecutive time in its Olympic history, Sweden was represented by more female than male athletes.

Sweden left London with a total of 8 Olympic medals (1 gold, 4 silver, and 3 bronze), tying with Tokyo and Atlanta for the overall highest medal count. Two medals each were awarded to athletes in sailing and wrestling, and one each in equestrian, handball, and triathlon. For the first time since 1992, Sweden won more than a single Olympic medal in Greco-Roman wrestling.

Among the nation's medalists were Star sailors Fredrik Lööf and Max Salminen, who together won Sweden's only gold medal in London, the nation's first in eight years. Lisa Nordén, who finished eighteenth in Beijing, became the first Swedish athlete to win an Olympic medal in women's triathlon. Meanwhile, equestrian eventing rider Sara Algotsson Ostholt won the nation's only silver medal in her sport. Sweden's team-based athletes also equalled their previous best Olympic results after 12 years, as they achieved a silver medal in men's handball. Several Swedish athletes narrowly missed out on the medal places in their events, including long jumper Michel Tornéus, singles sculls rower Lassi Karonen, swimmers Sarah Sjöström and Therese Alshammar, and sprint kayakers Sofia Paldanius and Anders Gustafsson.

== Medalists ==
Medals by sport
Sport	1st place, gold medalist(s)	2nd place, silver medalist(s)	3rd place, bronze medalist(s)	Total
Sailing	1	0	1	2
Equestrian	0	1	0	1
Handball	0	1	0	1
Shooting	0	1	0	1
Triathlon	0	1	0	1
Wrestling	0	0	2	2
Total	1	4	3	8

Medal	Name	Sport	Event	Date
Gold	Fredrik Lööf; Max Salminen	Sailing	Men's star class	5 August
Silver	Sara Algotsson Ostholt	Equestrian	Individual eventing	31 July
Silver	Håkan Dahlby	Shooting	Men's double trap	2 August
Silver	Lisa Nordén	Triathlon	Women's event	4 August
Silver	Sweden men's national handball team: Kim Andersson; Mattias Andersson; Dalibor Doder; Niclas Ekberg; Kim Ekdahl du Rietz; Mattias Gustafsson; Johan Jakobsson; Magnus Jernemyr; Tobias Karlsson; Jonas Källman; Jonas Larholm; Andreas Nilsson; Fredrik Petersen; Johan Sjöstrand; Mattias Zachrisson	Handball	Men's tournament	12 August
Bronze	Rasmus Myrgren	Sailing	Men's Laser class	6 August
Bronze	Johan Eurén	Wrestling	Men's Greco-Roman 120 kg	6 August
Bronze	Jimmy Lidberg	Wrestling	Men's Greco-Roman 96 kg	7 August

== Delegation ==
Sveriges Olympiska Kommitté (SOK) selected a team of 134 athletes, 55 men and 79 women, to compete in 20 sports; it was the nation's fourteenth largest team sent to the Olympics outside the host nation. Handball and women's football were the only team-based sports in which Sweden had its representation in these Olympic games. There was only a single competitor in archery, badminton, mountain biking, judo, and triathlon. Sailing was the largest team by individual-based sport, with a total of 14 competitors. Sweden also marked its Olympic return in men's handball after a twelve-year absence.

The Swedish team featured past Olympic medalists, four of them from Beijing (road cyclists Gustav Larsson and Emma Johansson, sailor Fredrik Lööf in the Star class, and equestrian show jumper Rolf-Göran Bengtsson, who competed at his fifth Olympics). For being the oldest and most experienced athlete, Bengtsson, at age 50, was Sweden's flag bearer at the opening ceremony. Table tennis player Jörgen Persson became the second Swedish athlete to compete in seven Olympic games, tying the record set by pistol shooter and former Olympic record holder Ragnar Skanåker. Dressage rider Tinne Vilhelmsson-Silfvén, and butterfly swimmer Lars Frölander, along with Lööf, competed at their sixth Olympics. Meanwhile, four other Swedish athletes made their fifth Olympic appearance, along with Bengtsson: equestrian eventing rider Linda Algotsson, freestyle swimmer Therese Alshammar, and sprint kayak pair and double Olympic medalists Henrik Nilsson and Markus Oscarsson. Gymnast Jonna Adlerteg, at age 17, was the youngest athlete of the team.

Other notable Swedish athletes featured sprint kayaker and world champion Anders Gustafsson, butterfly swimmer and triple European champion Sarah Sjöström, tennis doubles specialist Robert Lindstedt, triathlete and former World Series champion Lisa Nordén, and equestrian eventing rider Sara Algotsson Ostholt, who made her Olympic comeback in London after a twelve-year absence.

The following is the list of number of competitors participating in the Games. Note that reserves in football and handball are not counted as athletes:

Sport	Men	Women	Total
Archery	0	1	1
Athletics	3	6	9
Badminton	1	0	1
Boxing	2	1	3
Canoeing	3	3	6
Cycling	1	4	5
Diving	1	1	2
Equestrian	6	6	12
Football	0	18	18
Gymnastics	0	1	1
Handball	14	14	28
Judo	1	0	1
Rowing	1	1	2
Sailing	8	6	14
Shooting	3	1	4
Swimming	2	9	11
Table tennis	3	0	3
Taekwondo	1	1	2
Tennis	2	1	3
Triathlon	0	1	1
Wrestling	3	3	6
Total	55	79	134

== Archery ==
Athlete	Event	Ranking round		Round of 64	Round of 32	Round of 16	Quarterfinals	Semifinals	Final / BM	
Athlete	Event	Score	Seed	Opposition Score	Opposition Score	Opposition Score	Opposition Score	Opposition Score	Opposition Score	Rank
Christine Bjerendal	Women's individual	625	49	Hayakawa (JPN) (16); L 4–6	Did not advance					

== Athletics ==
Swedish athletes have so far achieved qualifying standards in the following athletics events (up to a maximum of 3 athletes in each event at the 'A' Standard, and 1 at the 'B' Standard):

Key

- Note – Ranks given for track events are within the athlete's heat only
- Q = Qualified for the next round
- q = Qualified for the next round as a fastest loser or, in field events, by position without achieving the qualifying target
- NR = National record
- N/A = Round not applicable for the event
- Bye = Athlete not required to compete in round

Men
Field events

Athlete	Event	Qualification		Final	
Athlete	Event	Distance	Position	Distance	Position
Kim Amb	Javelin throw	78.94	18	Did not advance	
Alhaji Jeng	Pole vault	NM	—	Did not advance	
Michel Tornéus	Long jump	8.03	6 q	8.11	4

Women
Track & road events

Athlete	Event	Heat		Semifinal		Final	
Athlete	Event	Result	Rank	Result	Rank	Result	Rank
Isabellah Andersson	Marathon	—N/a				2:27:36	18
Moa Hjelmer	400 m	52.86	4	Did not advance			

Field events

Athlete	Event	Qualification		Final	
Athlete	Event	Distance	Position	Distance	Position
Angelica Bengtsson	Pole vault	4.25	=19	Did not advance	
Emma Green Tregaro	High jump	1.93	=2 q	1.93	8
Ebba Jungmark	High jump	1.85	=20	Did not advance	

Combined events – Heptathlon

Athlete	Event	100H	HJ	SP	200 m	LJ	JT	800 m	Final	Rank
Jessica Samuelsson	Result	13.58	1.77	14.18	24.25	6.18	42.02	2:11.31	6300 PB	14
Jessica Samuelsson	Points	1039	941	806	957	905	706	946	6300 PB	14

== Badminton ==
Athlete	Event	Group stage			Round of 16	Quarterfinal	Semifinal	Final / BM	
Athlete	Event	Opposition Score	Opposition Score	Rank	Opposition Score	Opposition Score	Opposition Score	Opposition Score	Rank
Henri Hurskainen	Men's singles	Cordón (GUA); L 21–15, 12–21, 15–21	Ouseph (GBR); L 20–22, 21–17, 15–21	3	Did not advance				

== Boxing ==
After the 2012 European Boxing Olympic Qualification Tournament, Sweden has qualified two boxers. Anna Laurell received a wild card.

Men

Athlete	Event	Round of 32	Round of 16	Quarterfinals	Semifinals	Final	
Athlete	Event	Opposition Result	Opposition Result	Opposition Result	Opposition Result	Opposition Result	Rank
Salamo N'tuve	Flyweight	Suleimenov (KAZ); L 8–13	Did not advance				
Anthony Yigit	Light welterweight	Ramirez (PUR); W 13–9	Berinchyk (UKR); L 23–24	Did not advance			

Women

Athlete	Event	Round of 16	Quarterfinals	Semifinals	Final	
Athlete	Event	Opposition Result	Opposition Result	Opposition Result	Opposition Result	Rank
Anna Laurell	Middleweight	Rasmussen (AUS); W 24–17	Shields (USA); L 14–18	Did not advance		

== Canoeing ==
=== Sprint ===
Athlete	Event	Heats		Semifinals		Finals	
Athlete	Event	Time	Rank	Time	Rank	Time	Rank
Anders Gustafsson	Men's K-1 1000 m	3:34.419	1 Q	3:31.149	3 FA	3:29.919	5
Henrik Nilsson; Markus Oscarsson	Men's K-2 1000 m	3:16.590	3 Q	3:13.125	1 FA	3:11.803	5
Sofia Paldanius	Women's K-1 200 m	42.596	2 Q	42.688	6	Did not advance	
Sofia Paldanius	Women's K-1 500 m	1:51.212	1 Q	1:51.945	3 FA	1:53.197	4
Karin Johansson; Josefin Nordlöw	Women's K-2 500 m	1:44.437	1 Q	1:44.025	6 FB	1:45.367	10

Qualification Legend: FA = Qualify to final (medal); FB = Qualify to final B (non-medal)

== Cycling ==
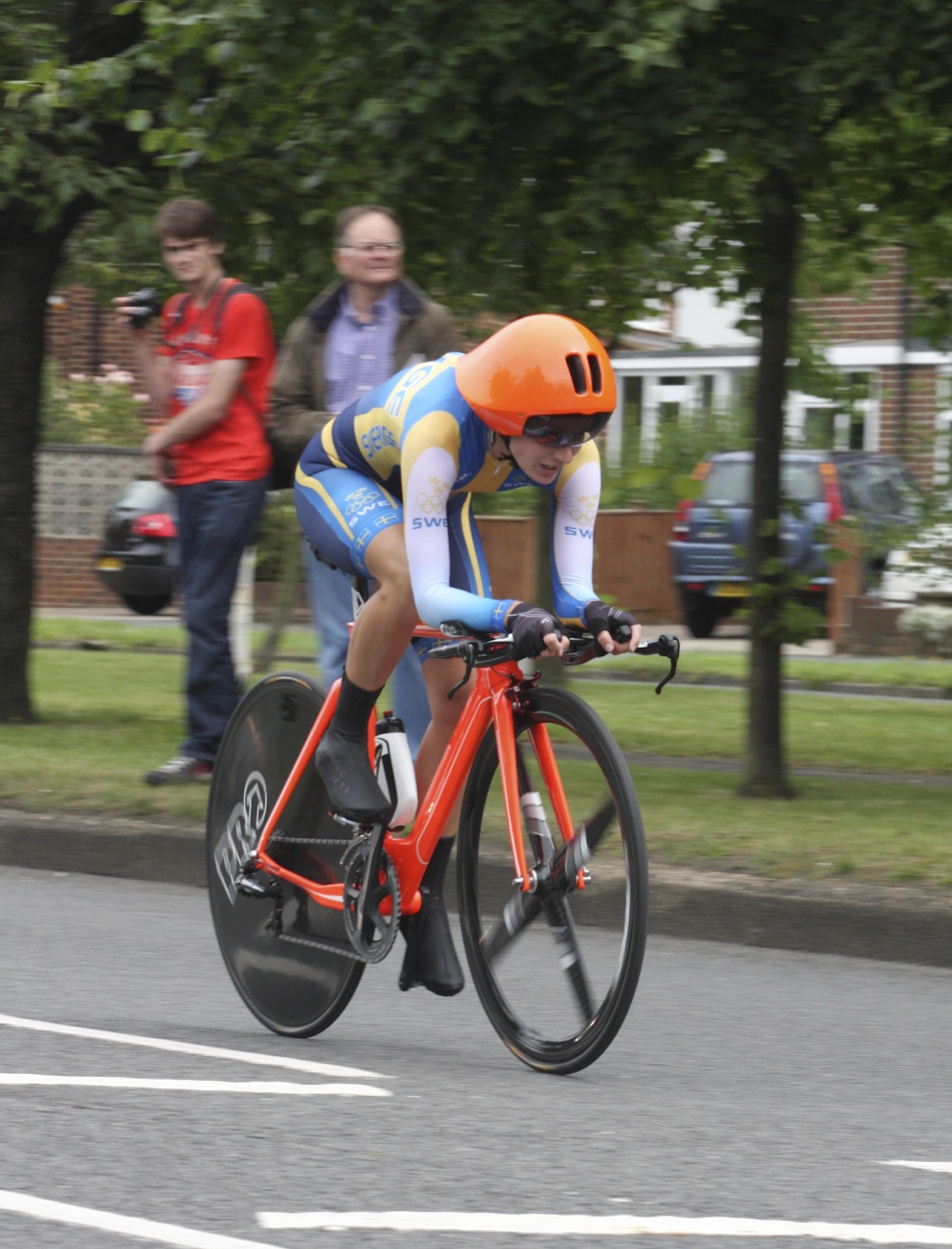
Emma Johansson in women's road time trial.

=== Road ===
Athlete	Event	Time	Rank
Gustav Larsson	Men's road race	5:46:37	76
Gustav Larsson	Men's time trial	54:35.26	16
Emilia Fahlin	Women's road race	3:35:56	19
Emilia Fahlin	Women's time trial	41:15.86	17
Emma Johansson	Women's road race	3:35:56	6
Emma Johansson	Women's time trial	40:38.56	14
Isabelle Söderberg	Women's road race	OTL	

=== Mountain biking ===
Athlete	Event	Time	Rank
Alexandra Engen	Women's cross-country	1:33:08	6

== Diving ==
Men

Athlete	Event	Preliminaries		Semifinals		Final	
Athlete	Event	Points	Rank	Points	Rank	Points	Rank
Christofer Eskilsson	10 m platform	375.30	25	Did not advance			

Women

Athlete	Event	Preliminaries		Semifinals		Final	
Athlete	Event	Points	Rank	Points	Rank	Points	Rank
Anna Lindberg	3 m springboard	318.60	11 Q	319.80	10 Q	316.80	10

== Equestrian ==
=== Dressage ===
Sweden has qualified one team and three individual quota places after finishing in fourth place at the 2011 European Dressage Championship. Rose Mathisen is a reserve in the team dressage event.

Athlete	Horse	Event	Grand Prix		Grand Prix Special		Grand Prix Freestyle		Overall	
Athlete	Horse	Event	Score	Rank	Score	Rank	Technical	Artistic	Score	Rank
Patrik Kittel	Scandic	Individual	74.073	15 Q	74.079	14 Q	75.750	81.714	78.732	14
Minna Telde	Santana	Individual	67.477	44 Q	72.270	20	Did not advance			
Tinne Vilhelmsson-Silfvén	Don Auriello	Individual	74.271	14 Q	74.063	15 Q	76.143	82.429	79.286	11
Patrik Kittel; Minna Telde; Tinne Vilhelmsson-Silfvén	See above	Team	71.940	7 Q	73.471	5	—N/a		72.706	5

=== Eventing ===
Sweden has qualified one team and five quota places in the individual event after finishing in fourth place at the 2011 European Eventing Championships.

Athlete	Horse	Event	Dressage		Cross-country			Jumping						Total	
Athlete	Horse	Event	Dressage		Cross-country			Qualifier			Final			Total	
Athlete	Horse	Event	Penalties	Rank	Penalties	Total	Rank	Penalties	Total	Rank	Penalties	Total	Rank	Penalties	Rank
Linda Algotsson	La Fair	Individual	59.80	=62	20.00	79.80	43	0.00	79.80	36	Did not advance			79.80	36
Sara Algotsson Ostholt	Wega	Individual	39.30	=4	0.00	39.30	=1	0.00	39.30	1 Q	4.00	43.30	2	43.30	2nd place, silver medalist(s)
Niklas Lindbäck	Mister Pooh	Individual	45.20	22	2.80	48.00	13	9.00	57.00	20 Q	11.00	68.00	18	68.00	18
Malin Petersen	Sofarsogood	Individual	60.40	65	0.80	61.20	30	6.00	67.20	26	Did not advance			67.20	26
Ludvig Svennerstål	Shamwari	Individual	43.70	16	0.40	44.10	7	8.00	52.10	11 Q	20.00	72.10	20	72.10	20
Linda Algotsson; Sara Algotsson Ostholt; Niklas Lindbäck; Malin Petersen; Ludvig Svennerstål	See above	Team	128.20	=4	3.20	131.40	3	17.00	148.40	4	—N/a			148.40	4

=== Jumping ===
After the 2011 European Championships, Sweden has qualified four quota places in the individual event and one place in the team event.

Athlete	Horse	Event	Qualification								Final					Total	
Athlete	Horse	Event	Round 1		Round 2			Round 3			Round A		Round B			Total	
Athlete	Horse	Event	Penalties	Rank	Penalties	Total	Rank	Penalties	Total	Rank	Penalties	Rank	Penalties	Total	Rank	Penalties	Rank
Rolf-Göran Bengtsson	Casall La Silla	Individual	0	=1 Q	0	0	=1 Q	8	8	=11 Q	Did not start						
Lisen Bratt Fredricson	Matrix	Individual	42	=72	Did not advance											42	=72
Henrik von Eckermann	Allerdings	Individual	0	=1 Q	0	0	=1 Q	16	16	=33 Q	8	=23	Did not advance			8	=23
Jens Fredricson	Lunatic	Individual	0	=1 Q	8	8	=31 Q	4	12	=26 Q	9	=26	Did not advance			9	=26
Rolf-Göran Bengtsson; Lisen Bratt Fredricson; Henrik von Eckermann; Jens Fredricson	See above	Team	—N/a								4	=2	24	28	=6	28	=6

== Football ==
Summary

Key:

- A.E.T – After extra time.
- P – Match decided by penalty-shootout.

Team	Event	Group Stage				Quarterfinal	Semifinal	Final / BM	
Team	Event	Opposition Score	Opposition Score	Opposition Score	Rank	Opposition Score	Opposition Score	Opposition Score	Rank
Sweden women's	Women's tournament	South Africa; W 4–1	Japan; D 0–0	Canada; D 2–2	1 Q	France; L 1–2	Did not advance		7

=== Women's tournament ===
Sweden women's football team qualified for the event by finishing as the best of the European teams in the 2011 FIFA Women's World Cup.

Team roster

Head coach: Thomas Dennerby

Sweden named a squad of 18 players and 4 alternates for the tournament.

No.	Pos.	Player	Date of birth (age)	Caps	Goals	Club
1	GK	Hedvig Lindahl	29 April 1983 (aged 29)	86	0	(Swedish Football Association) Kristianstad
2	DF	Linda Sembrant	15 May 1987 (aged 25)	35	1	(Swedish Football Association) Tyresö
3	DF	Emma Berglund	19 December 1988 (aged 23)	11	0	(Swedish Football Association) Umeå
4	DF	Annica Svensson	3 March 1983 (aged 29)	28	0	(Swedish Football Association) Tyresö
5	MF	Nilla Fischer (captain)	2 August 1984 (aged 27)	90	12	(Swedish Football Association) Linköping
6	DF	Sara Thunebro	26 April 1979 (aged 33)	93	3	(German Football Association) FFC Frankfurt
7	MF	Lisa Dahlkvist	6 February 1987 (aged 25)	56	7	(Swedish Football Association) Tyresö
8	FW	Lotta Schelin	27 February 1984 (aged 28)	107	45	(French Football Federation) Lyon
9	MF	Kosovare Asllani	29 July 1989 (aged 22)	36	6	(Swedish Football Association) Kristianstad
10	MF	Sofia Jakobsson	23 April 1990 (aged 22)	17	3	(Russian Football Union) WFC Rossiyanka
11	MF	Antonia Göransson	16 September 1990 (aged 21)	24	4	(German Football Association) FFC Turbine Potsdam
12	MF	Marie Hammarström	29 March 1982 (aged 30)	23	1	(Swedish Football Association) Örebro
13	DF	Lina Nilsson	17 June 1987 (aged 25)	34	0	(Swedish Football Association) Malmö
14	MF	Johanna Almgren	22 March 1984 (aged 28)	40	0	(Swedish Football Association) Göteborg
15	MF	Caroline Seger	19 March 1985 (aged 27)	93	13	(Swedish Football Association) Tyresö
16	FW	Madelaine Edlund	15 September 1985 (aged 26)	33	1	(Swedish Football Association) Tyresö
17	DF	Malin Levenstad	13 September 1988 (aged 23)	6	0	(Swedish Football Association) Malmö
18	GK	Sofia Lundgren	20 September 1982 (aged 29)	26	0	(Swedish Football Association) Linköping

Preliminary round

Pos	Team	Pld	W	D	L	GF	GA	GD	Pts	Qualification
1	Sweden	3	1	2	0	6	3	+3	5	Qualified for the quarter-finals
2	Japan	3	1	2	0	2	1	+1	5	Qualified for the quarter-finals
3	Canada	3	1	1	1	6	4	+2	4	Qualified for the quarter-finals
4	South Africa	3	0	1	2	1	7	−6	1	

Source: IOC
25 July 2012
19:45

Sweden	4–1	South Africa
Fischer 7'; Dahlkvist 20'; Schelin 21', 63'	Report; Report	Modise 60'

City of Coventry Stadium, Coventry
Attendance: 18,290
Referee: Salomé di Iorio (Argentina)

28 July 2012
12:00

Japan	0–0	Sweden
	Report; Report

City of Coventry Stadium, Coventry
Attendance: 14,160
Referee: Quetzalli Alvarado (Mexico)

31 July 2012
14:30

Canada	2–2	Sweden
Tancredi 43', 84'	Report; Report	Hammarström 14'; Jakobsson 16'

St James' Park, Newcastle
Attendance: 12,719
Referee: Hong Eun-ah (South Korea)

Quarterfinal

3 August 2012
12:00

Sweden	1–2	France
Fischer 18'	Report; Report	Georges 29'; Renard 39'

Hampden Park, Glasgow
Attendance: 12,869
Referee: Kari Seitz (United States)

== Gymnastics ==
Jonna Adlerteg ensured a quota place at the 2012 Olympic Test Event.

=== Artistic ===
Women

Athlete	Event	Qualification						Final					
Athlete	Event	Apparatus				Total	Rank	Apparatus				Total	Rank
Athlete	Event	F	V	UB	BB	Total	Rank	F	V	UB	BB	Total	Rank
Jonna Adlerteg	All-around	12.466	13.600	13.933	12.200	52.199	39	Did not advance					

Adlerteg was ranked 31st in the uneven bars event, 63rd in the balance beam event, and 70th in the floor event.

== Handball ==
Summary

Key:

- ET: After extra time
- P – Match decided by penalty-shootout.

Team	Event	Group Stage						Quarterfinal	Semifinal	Final / BM	
Team	Event	Opposition Score	Opposition Score	Opposition Score	Opposition Score	Opposition Score	Rank	Opposition Score	Opposition Score	Opposition Score	Rank
Sweden men's	Men's tournament	Tunisia; W 28–21	Great Britain; W 41–19	Iceland; L 32–33	Argentina; W 29–13	France; L 26–29	3 Q	Denmark; W 24–22	Hungary; W 27–26	France; L 21–22	2nd place, silver medalist(s)
Sweden women's	Women's tournament	Denmark; L 18–21	Norway; L 21–24	France; L 17–29	Spain; L 24–25	South Korea; L 28–32	6	Did not advance			11

Sweden women's handball team qualified to the Olympic Games as runners-up from the European Championships, and the men's team qualified through the IHF Qualification Tournament.

=== Men's tournament ===
Team roster

The following is the Swedish roster in the men's handball tournament of the 2012 Summer Olympics.

Head coaches: Staffan Olsson and Ola Lindgren

No.	Pos.	Name	Date of birth (age)	Height	App.	Goals	Club
1	GK	Mattias Andersson	29 March 1978 (aged 34)	1.86 m	81	0	(Germany) Flensburg
3	P	Mattias Gustafsson	11 July 1978 (aged 34)	1.93 m	90	137	(Germany) Lübbecke
5	RB	Kim Andersson	21 August 1982 (aged 29)	2.00 m	193	704	(Germany) Kiel
6	LW	Jonas Källman	17 July 1981 (aged 31)	2.00 m	158	488	(Spain) Atlético Madrid
7	P	Magnus Jernemyr	18 June 1976 (aged 36)	2.00 m	90	5	(Spain) Barcelona
10	RW	Niclas Ekberg	23 December 1988 (aged 23)	1.91 m	65	271	(Denmark) København
11	CB	Dalibor Doder	7 May 1979 (aged 33)	1.82 m	135	392	(Germany) Minden
15	LB	Jonas Larholm	3 June 1982 (aged 30)	1.93 m	180	579	(Denmark) Aalborg
18	P	Tobias Karlsson	4 June 1981 (aged 31)	1.96 m	109	71	(Germany) Flensburg
19	RB	Johan Jakobsson	12 February 1987 (aged 25)	1.95 m	47	59	(Denmark) Aalborg
22	GK	Johan Sjöstrand	27 February 1987 (aged 25)	1.95 m	56	0	(Spain) Barcelona
24	LW/CB	Fredrik Petersen	27 August 1983 (aged 28)	1.88 m	77	190	(Denmark) Bjerringbro-Silkeborg
25	LB	Kim Ekdahl du Rietz	23 July 1989 (aged 23)	1.96 m	51	141	(France) Nantes
32	RW	Mattias Zakrisson	22 August 1990 (aged 21)	1.78 m	21	37	(Sweden) Eskilstuna
35	P	Andreas Nilsson	12 April 1990 (aged 22)	1.96 m	23	38	(Sweden) Skövde

Group play

Team	Pld	W	D	L	GF	GA	GD	Pts	Qualification
Iceland	5	5	0	0	167	132	+35	10	Quarter-finals
France	5	4	0	1	159	110	+49	8	Quarter-finals
Sweden	5	3	0	2	156	115	+41	6	Quarter-finals
Tunisia	5	2	0	3	121	125	−4	4	Quarter-finals
Argentina	5	1	0	4	113	138	−25	2	
Great Britain	5	0	0	5	96	192	−96	0	

29 July 2012; 14:30	Sweden	28 – 21	Tunisia	Copper Box, London; Attendance: 4,155; Referees: Raluy López, Sabroso (ESP)
29 July 2012; 14:30	Doder 8	(16–11)	Boughanmi 6	Copper Box, London; Attendance: 4,155; Referees: Raluy López, Sabroso (ESP)
29 July 2012; 14:30	3× (yellow card) 4× (suspension)	Report	3× (yellow card) 5× (suspension)	Copper Box, London; Attendance: 4,155; Referees: Raluy López, Sabroso (ESP)

31 July 2012; 14:30	Great Britain	19 – 41	Sweden	Copper Box, London; Attendance: 4,382; Referees: Nikolić, Stojković (SRB)
31 July 2012; 14:30	Larsson 4	(10–24)	Ekberg 13	Copper Box, London; Attendance: 4,382; Referees: Nikolić, Stojković (SRB)
31 July 2012; 14:30	3× (yellow card) 6× (suspension) 1× (red card)	Report	3× (yellow card) 4× (suspension)	Copper Box, London; Attendance: 4,382; Referees: Nikolić, Stojković (SRB)

2 August 2012; 21:15	Sweden	32 – 33	Iceland	Copper Box, London; Attendance: 4,590; Referees: Nachevski, Nikolov (MKD)
2 August 2012; 21:15	Källman 9	(13–17)	Pálmarsson 9	Copper Box, London; Attendance: 4,590; Referees: Nachevski, Nikolov (MKD)
2 August 2012; 21:15	3× (yellow card) 3× (suspension)	Report	3× (yellow card) 8× (suspension)	Copper Box, London; Attendance: 4,590; Referees: Nachevski, Nikolov (MKD)

4 August 2012; 14:30	Sweden	29 – 13	Argentina	Copper Box, London; Attendance: 4,592; Referees: López, Sabroso (ESP)
4 August 2012; 14:30	Ekberg 9	(12–8)	Simonet 3	Copper Box, London; Attendance: 4,592; Referees: López, Sabroso (ESP)
4 August 2012; 14:30	4× (yellow card) 1× (suspension)	Report	3× (yellow card) 2× (suspension)	Copper Box, London; Attendance: 4,592; Referees: López, Sabroso (ESP)

6 August 2012; 21:15	France	29 – 26	Sweden	Copper Box, London; Attendance: 4,833; Referees: Gubica, Milošević (CRO)
6 August 2012; 21:15	Narcisse 6	(18–12)	Ekberg, Andersson 5	Copper Box, London; Attendance: 4,833; Referees: Gubica, Milošević (CRO)
6 August 2012; 21:15	3× (yellow card) 1× (suspension)	Report	3× (yellow card) 2× (suspension)	Copper Box, London; Attendance: 4,833; Referees: Gubica, Milošević (CRO)

Quarter-final

8 August 2012; 18:00	Sweden	24 – 22	Denmark	Basketball Arena, London; Attendance: 9,494; Referees: Nachevski, Nikolov (MKD)
8 August 2012; 18:00	Doder 6	(11–9)	Lindberg 6	Basketball Arena, London; Attendance: 9,494; Referees: Nachevski, Nikolov (MKD)
8 August 2012; 18:00	4× (yellow card) 5× (suspension)	Report	4× (yellow card) 2× (suspension)	Basketball Arena, London; Attendance: 9,494; Referees: Nachevski, Nikolov (MKD)

Semi-final

10 August 2012; 17:00	Hungary	26 – 27	Sweden	Basketball Arena, London; Attendance: 9,597; Referees: Geipel, Helbig (GER)
10 August 2012; 17:00	Császár 8	(12–15)	Ekberg 6	Basketball Arena, London; Attendance: 9,597; Referees: Geipel, Helbig (GER)
10 August 2012; 17:00	4× (yellow card) 3× (suspension)	Report	3× (yellow card) 5× (suspension)	Basketball Arena, London; Attendance: 9,597; Referees: Geipel, Helbig (GER)

Gold medal match

12 August 2012; 15:00	Sweden	21 – 22	France	Basketball Arena, London; Attendance: 9,627; Referees: Krstić, Ljubić (SLO)
12 August 2012; 15:00	Ekberg 6	(8–10)	Guigou 5	Basketball Arena, London; Attendance: 9,627; Referees: Krstić, Ljubić (SLO)
12 August 2012; 15:00	3× (yellow card) 4× (suspension)	Report	4× (yellow card) 2× (suspension)	Basketball Arena, London; Attendance: 9,627; Referees: Krstić, Ljubić (SLO)

=== Women's tournament ===
Team roster

The following is the Swedish roster in the women's handball tournament of the 2012 Summer Olympics.

Head coaches: Per Johansson

No.	Pos.	Name	Date of birth (age)	Height	App.	Goals	Club
2	P	Ulrika Ågren	13 July 1987 (aged 25)	1.77 m	24	32	(Denmark) Esbjerg
3	P	Tina Flognman	29 June 1981 (aged 31)	1.78 m	204	369	(France) Toulon
4	LW	Matilda Boson	4 December 1981 (aged 30)	1.76 m	199	491	(Sweden) Spårvägen
5	P	Hanna Fogelström	8 November 1990 (aged 21)	1.79 m	17	29	(Sweden) Sävehof
6	RB	Therese Islas Helgesson	28 May 1990 (aged 22)	1.69 m	102	202	(France) Toulon
8	LB	Jamina Roberts	28 May 1990 (aged 22)	1.75 m	40	55	(Sweden) Sävehof
10	RW	Annika Wiel Fredén	21 August 1978 (aged 33)	1.76 m	101	305	(Sweden) Heid
12	GK	Gabriella Kain	25 March 1981 (aged 31)	1.79 m	74	0	(Denmark) Kolding
15	LB	Johanna Ahlm	3 October 1987 (aged 24)	1.75 m	79	301	(Denmark) Viborg
16	GK	Cecilia Grubbström	2 September 1986 (aged 25)	1.78 m	60	1	(Sweden) Sävehof
17	CB	Linnea Torstenson	30 March 1983 (aged 29)	1.86 m	117	500	(Denmark) Midtjylland
18	P	Johanna Wiberg	6 September 1983 (aged 28)	1.85 m	136	90	(Sweden) Eslöv
20	CB	Isabelle Gulldén	29 June 1989 (aged 23)	1.78 m	88	245	(Denmark) Viborg
25	CB	Angelica Wallén	11 April 1986 (aged 26)	1.71 m	37	58	(Denmark) Esbjerg
31	LB	Anna-Maria Johansson	15 February 1982 (aged 30)	1.80 m	45	97	(Sweden) Skövde

Group play

Team	Pld	W	D	L	GF	GA	GD	Pts	Qualification
France	5	4	1	0	125	103	+22	9	Quarter-finals
South Korea	5	3	1	1	136	130	+6	7	Quarter-finals
Spain	5	3	1	1	119	114	+5	7	Quarter-finals
Norway	5	2	1	2	118	120	−2	5	Quarter-finals
Denmark	5	1	0	4	113	121	−8	2	
Sweden	5	0	0	5	108	131	−23	0	

28 July 2012; 16:15	Denmark	21 – 18	Sweden	Copper Box, London; Attendance: 3,942; Referees: Nikolić, Stojković (SRB)
28 July 2012; 16:15	Skov 6	(8–10)	Gulldén 5	Copper Box, London; Attendance: 3,942; Referees: Nikolić, Stojković (SRB)
28 July 2012; 16:15	3× (yellow card) 4× (suspension)	Report	4× (yellow card) 3× (suspension)	Copper Box, London; Attendance: 3,942; Referees: Nikolić, Stojković (SRB)

30 July 2012; 21:15	Sweden	21 – 24	Norway	Copper Box, London; Attendance: 4,459; Referees: Coulibaly, Diabate (CIV)
30 July 2012; 21:15	Torstenson 6	(9–14)	Koren, Sulland 5	Copper Box, London; Attendance: 4,459; Referees: Coulibaly, Diabate (CIV)
30 July 2012; 21:15	3× (yellow card) 3× (suspension)	Report	3× (yellow card) 3× (suspension)	Copper Box, London; Attendance: 4,459; Referees: Coulibaly, Diabate (CIV)

1 August 2012; 14:30	France	29 – 17	Sweden	Copper Box, London; Attendance: 4,638; Referees: Gubica, Milošević (CRO)
1 August 2012; 14:30	three players 4	(16–11)	Ahlm 6	Copper Box, London; Attendance: 4,638; Referees: Gubica, Milošević (CRO)
1 August 2012; 14:30	3× (yellow card) 2× (suspension)	Report	3× (yellow card) 1× (suspension)	Copper Box, London; Attendance: 4,638; Referees: Gubica, Milošević (CRO)

3 August 2012; 19:30	Spain	25 – 24	Sweden	Copper Box, London; Attendance: 4,234; Referees: Al-Nuaimi, Omar (UAE)
3 August 2012; 19:30	Mangué, Alberto 6	(11–10)	Fogelström 5	Copper Box, London; Attendance: 4,234; Referees: Al-Nuaimi, Omar (UAE)
3 August 2012; 19:30	3× (yellow card) 3× (suspension)	Report	4× (yellow card) 2× (suspension)	Copper Box, London; Attendance: 4,234; Referees: Al-Nuaimi, Omar (UAE)

5 August 2012; 09:30	Sweden	28 – 32	South Korea	Copper Box, London; Attendance: 4,180; Referees: Abdulla, Bamutref (QAT)
5 August 2012; 09:30	Flognman 8	(13–16)	Ryu Eun-hee 10	Copper Box, London; Attendance: 4,180; Referees: Abdulla, Bamutref (QAT)
5 August 2012; 09:30	4× (yellow card) 4× (suspension)	Report	3× (yellow card) 5× (suspension)	Copper Box, London; Attendance: 4,180; Referees: Abdulla, Bamutref (QAT)

== Judo ==
Athlete	Event	Round of 32	Round of 16	Quarterfinals	Semifinals	Repechage	Final / BM	
Athlete	Event	Opposition Result	Opposition Result	Opposition Result	Opposition Result	Opposition Result	Opposition Result	Rank
Marcus Nyman	Men's −90 kg	Choriev (UZB); L 0013–0101	Did not advance					

== Rowing ==
Sweden qualified two boats at the 2011 World Championships.

Men

Athlete	Event	Heats		Repechage		Quarterfinals		Semifinals		Finals	
Athlete	Event	Time	Rank	Time	Rank	Time	Rank	Time	Rank	Time	Rank
Lassi Karonen	Single sculls	6:45.42	1 Q	Bye		6:57.06	1 SA/B	7:19.77	2 FA	7:04.04	4

Women

Athlete	Event	Heats		Repechage		Quarterfinals		Semifinals		Finals	
Athlete	Event	Time	Rank	Time	Rank	Time	Rank	Time	Rank	Time	Rank
Frida Svensson	Single sculls	7:32.61	2 Q	Bye		7:40.64	3 SA/B	7:54.52	5 FB	7:56.42	10

Qualification Legend: FA=Final A (medal); FB=Final B (non-medal); FC=Final C (non-medal); FD=Final D (non-medal); FE=Final E (non-medal); FF=Final F (non-medal); SA/B=Semifinals A/B; SC/D=Semifinals C/D; SE/F=Semifinals E/F; Q=Quarterfinals; R=Repechage

== Sailing ==
At the 2011 World Championships in Perth, Sweden qualified boats in all classes with Swedish participation.

Men

Athlete	Event	Race											Net points	Final rank
Athlete	Event	1	2	3	4	5	6	7	8	9	10	M*	Net points	Final rank
Rasmus Myrgren	Laser	11	5	4	5	~~25~~	10	4	9	10	2	12	72	3rd place, bronze medalist(s)
Daniel Birgmark	Finn	~~17~~	5	14	1	9	9	10	12	10	8	12	90	9
Anton Dahlberg; Sebastian Östling	470	4	6	8	14	13	9	14	~~24~~	22	13	20	123	10
Fredrik Lööf; Max Salminen	Star	~~10~~	4	4	1	5	3	4	1	2	5	2	32	1st place, gold medalist(s)

Women
Fleet racing

Athlete	Event	Race											Net points	Final rank
Athlete	Event	1	2	3	4	5	6	7	8	9	10	M*	Net points	Final rank
Josefin Olsson	Laser Radial	25	17	5	18	14	24	~~29~~	29	5	14	EL	151	18
Lisa Ericson; Astrid Gabrielsson	470	17	12	11	9	16	~~20~~	19	13	18	20	EL	128	19

Match racing

Athlete	Event	Round robin											Rank	Knockouts			Rank
Athlete	Event	RUS	NZL	FIN	FRA	ESP	DEN	POR	AUS	GBR	USA	NED	Rank	Q-final	S-final	Final	Rank
Lotta Harrysson; Malin Källström; Anna Kjellberg	Elliott 6m	L	L	L	L	L	L	L	L	L	L	W	=11	Did not advance			=11

Open

Athlete	Event	Race																Net points	Final rank
Athlete	Event	1	2	3	4	5	6	7	8	9	10	11	12	13	14	15	M*	Net points	Final rank
Niclas Düring; Jonas von Geijer	49er	5	3	12	8	17	4	14	3	16	8	~~19~~	6	18	10	11	18	153	10

M = Medal race; EL = Eliminated – did not advance into the medal race;

== Shooting ==
Sweden has qualified four quota places in the shooting events.

Men

Athlete	Event	Qualification		Final	
Athlete	Event	Points	Rank	Points	Rank
Håkan Dahlby	Double trap	137	5 Q	186	2nd place, silver medalist(s)
Stefan Nilsson	Skeet	118	15	Did not advance	
Marcus Svensson	Skeet	119	7	Did not advance	

Women

Athlete	Event	Qualification		Final	
Athlete	Event	Points	Rank	Points	Rank
Therese Lundqvist	Skeet	67 S/O 1	7	Did not advance	

== Swimming ==
Men

Athlete	Event	Heat		Semifinal		Final	
Athlete	Event	Time	Rank	Time	Rank	Time	Rank
Lars Frölander	100 m butterfly	52.47	20	Did not advance			
Stefan Nystrand	50 m freestyle	22.32	17	Did not advance			
Stefan Nystrand	100 m freestyle	49.55	25	Did not advance			

Women

Athlete	Event	Heat		Semifinal		Final	
Athlete	Event	Time	Rank	Time	Rank	Time	Rank
Therese Alshammar	50 m freestyle	24.77	6 Q	24.71	8 Q	24.61	6
Therese Alshammar	100 m freestyle	DNS		Did not advance			
Stina Gardell	200 m individual medley	2:14.70	20	Did not advance			
Stina Gardell	400 m individual medley	4:41.66	14	—N/a		Did not advance	
Martina Granström	100 m butterfly	58.70	14 Q	58.95	15	Did not advance	
Martina Granström	200 m butterfly	2:08.94	13 Q	2:07.83 NR	10	Did not advance	
Joline Höstman	100 m breaststroke	1:08.28	19	Did not advance			
Joline Höstman	200 m breaststroke	2:25.44	6 Q	2:24.77	10	Did not advance	
Jennie Johansson	100 m breaststroke	1:07.14	8 Q	1:07.57	10	Did not advance	
Sarah Sjöström	50 m freestyle	24.94	=10 Q	25.08	14	Did not advance	
Sarah Sjöström	100 m freestyle	54.26	=10 Q	53.93	9	Did not advance	
Sarah Sjöström	200 m freestyle	1:58.03	=7 Q	1:58.12	12	Did not advance	
Sarah Sjöström	100 m butterfly	57.45	4 Q	57.27	4 Q	57.17	4
Therese Svendsen	100 m backstroke	1:03.11	35	Did not advance			
Therese Alshammar*; Michelle Coleman; Gabriella Fagundez; Ida Marko-Varga; Sarah Sjöström	4 × 100 m freestyle relay	3:38.21	=7 Q	—N/a		DSQ	
Michelle Coleman; Gabriella Fagundez; Martina Granström; Joline Höstman; Ida Marko-Varga; Therese Svendsen	4 × 100 m medley relay	4:00.76 NR	10	—N/a		Did not advance	

== Table tennis ==
Sweden has qualified two men in the men's singles event, and one woman. Kristian Karlsson is selected as reserve in the men's team event.

Athlete	Event	Preliminary round	Round 1	Round 2	Round 3	Round 4	Quarterfinals	Semifinals	Final / BM	
Athlete	Event	Opposition Result	Opposition Result	Opposition Result	Opposition Result	Opposition Result	Opposition Result	Opposition Result	Opposition Result	Rank
Pär Gerell	Men's singles	Bye	Lashin (EGY); L 3–4	Did not advance						
Jörgen Persson	Men's singles	Bye	Toriola (NGR); W 4–1	Gaćina (CRO); L 0–4	Did not advance					
Pär Gerell; Jens Lundqvist; Jörgen Persson	Men's team	—N/a				Germany; L 1–3	Did not advance			

== Taekwondo ==
Elin Johansson has ensured a quota place for Sweden in the women's 67 kg by reaching the top 3 of the 2011 WTF World Qualification Tournament.

Athlete	Event	Round of 16	Quarterfinals	Semifinals	Repechage	Bronze medal	Final	
Athlete	Event	Opposition Result	Opposition Result	Opposition Result	Opposition Result	Opposition Result	Opposition Result	Rank
Uno Sanli	Men's −58 kg	González (ESP); L 6–7	Did not advance		Khalil (AUS); L 1–4 SDP	Did not advance		
Elin Johansson	Women's −67 kg	El Sawalhy (EGY); W 6–0	Marton (AUS); L 3–6	Did not advance				

== Tennis ==
Athlete	Event	Round of 64	Round of 32	Round of 16	Quarterfinals	Semifinals	Final / BM	
Athlete	Event	Opposition Score	Opposition Score	Opposition Score	Opposition Score	Opposition Score	Opposition Score	Rank
Johan Brunström; Robert Lindstedt	Men's doubles	—N/a	Djokovic / Troicki (SRB); W 7–6^{(10–8)}, 6–3	Čilić / Dodig (CRO); L 3–6, 2–6	Did not advance			
Sofia Arvidsson	Women's singles	Zvonareva (RUS); L 6–7^{(3–7)}, 4–6	Did not advance					
Sofia Arvidsson; Robert Lindstedt	Mixed doubles	—N/a		Vinci / Bracciali (ITA); L 3–6, 6–4, 8–10	Did not advance			

== Triathlon ==
Athlete	Event	Swim (1.5 km)	Trans 1	Bike (40 km)	Trans 2	Run (10 km)	Total Time	Rank
Lisa Nordén	Women's	19:17	0:47	1:05:33	0:29	33:42	1:59:48	2nd place, silver medalist(s)

== Wrestling ==
Sweden has qualified three quota places in the men's Greco-Roman wrestling, and three other quota places in the women's freestyle wrestling.

Key

- VT - Victory by Fall.
- PP - Decision by Points - the loser with technical points.
- PO - Decision by Points - the loser without technical points.

Men's Greco-Roman

Athlete	Event	Qualification	Round of 16	Quarterfinal	Semifinal	Repechage 1	Repechage 2	Final / BM	
Athlete	Event	Opposition Result	Opposition Result	Opposition Result	Opposition Result	Opposition Result	Opposition Result	Opposition Result	Rank
Robert Rosengren	−74 kg	Bye	Çebi (TUR); W 3–1 ^{PP}	Kazakevič (LTU); L 1–3 ^{PP}	Did not advance				9
Jimmy Lidberg	−96 kg	Bye	Saikawa (JPN); W 3–0 ^{PO}	Totrov (RUS); L 0–3 ^{PO}	Did not advance	Bye	Gadabadze (AZE); W 3–1 ^{PP}	Dzeinichenka (BLR); W 3–1 ^{PP}	3rd place, bronze medalist(s)
Johan Eurén	−120 kg	Tinaliyev (KAZ); W 3–0 ^{PO}	Deák-Bárdos (HUN); W 3–0 ^{PO}	Babajanzadeh (IRI); W 3–0 ^{PO}	Nabi (EST); L 1–3 ^{PP}	Bye		Chugoshvili (BLR); W 3–1 ^{PO}	3rd place, bronze medalist(s)

Women's freestyle

Athlete	Event	Qualification	Round of 16	Quarterfinal	Semifinal	Repechage 1	Repechage 2	Final / BM	
Athlete	Event	Opposition Result	Opposition Result	Opposition Result	Opposition Result	Opposition Result	Opposition Result	Opposition Result	Rank
Sofia Mattsson	−55 kg	Sundev (MGL); W 3–0 ^{PO}	Amri (TUN); W 3–0 ^{PO}	Zholobova (RUS); L 1–3 ^{PP}	Did not advance				7
Henna Johansson	−63 kg	Bye	Tynybekova (KGZ); W 3–1 ^{PP}	Icho (JPN); L 0–3 ^{PO}	Did not advance	Bye	Dugrenier (CAN); L 1–3 ^{PP}	Did not advance	10
Jenny Fransson	−72 kg	Bernard (USA); W 3–1 ^{PP}	Zlateva (BUL); L 0–3 ^{PO}	Did not advance		Marzaliuk (BLR); L 1–3 ^{PP}	Did not advance		9

== See also ==
- Sweden at the 2012 Winter Youth Olympics
- Sweden at the 2012 Summer Paralympics
