= Hedin =

Hedin may refer to

- Hedin (surname)
- Hedin (crater) on the Moon
- Sven Hedin Glacier in Canada
- A legendary figure in Nordic mythology, see Hedin and Högni
- Hedin, a dwarf character from the Inheritance series by Christopher Paolini

== See also ==
- Heðin
