= Kasper Palmar =

Swedish handball player (born 2003)

Personal information
- Full name: Kasper Hugo Palmar
- Nationality: Swedish
- Born: 27 October 2003 (age 22) Ystad, Sweden
- Height: 197 m (646 ft)

Sport
- Sport: Handball
- Position: Right back
- Current club: Fredericia HK
- Number: 91

Youth career
- Years: Team
- 2005-2008: Skjern Håndbold
- 2008-2018: IFK Ystad
- 2018-2021: Ystads IF

Senior clubs
- Years: Team
- 2021-2024: Ystads IF
- 2024-: Fredericia HK
National team
Years	Team	Apps	(Gls)
2023–	Sweden	2	(1)

Kasper Hugo Palmar (born 27 October 2003) is a Swedish handball player for Fredericia HK in the Danish Men's Handball League and the Swedish men's national team. He is the son of former Estonian handball player Kaupo Palmar.

Palmar made his international debut on the Swedish men's national team on 6 March 2023 against Spain. He also participated in the 2022 European Men's Under-20 Handball Championship in Porto, placing 4th.

In 2022, he became Swedish champions with Ystads IF, who claimed their third title. In January 2024, he signed a three-year deal with Fredericia HK until the summer of 2027.
