= Sebastian Seifert =

Swedish handball player (born 1978)

Personal information
- Full name: Sebastian Seifert
- Nationality: Swedish (Sweden)
- Born: December 12, 1978 (age 47) Ystad, Sweden
- Height: 190 cm (75 in)

Sport
- Sport: Handball
- Position: Playmaker

Senior clubs
- Years: Team
- 1997–2000: IFK Ystad
- 2000–2002: KIF Kolding
- 2002–2003: TuS Nettelstedt-Lübbecke
- 2003–2009: KIF Kolding
- 2009–2013: Ystads IF
National team
Years	Team	Apps	(Gls)
1999–2008	Sweden	105	(174)

Teams managed
- 2013–2017: Ystads IF
- 2018: HIF Karlskrona
- 2019–2023: IFK Ystad
- 10/2024-3/2025: KIF Kolding

Sebastian Seifert (born 12 December 1978) is a Swedish handball coach and previous player.

== Playing career ==
Seifert started his career at IFK Ystad. In 2000 he joined Danish top club KIF Kolding, where he won the 2001 and 2002 Danish championship and the 2002 Danish Cup. In 2002 he joined German TuS Nettelstedt-Lübbecke for a single season, before returning to KIF Kolding. Back at Kolding he won three more championships in 2005, 2006 and 2009 and two more cups in 2005 and 2007. In 2009 he returned to Sweden and joined Ystads IF. He retired in March 2013 due to an injury, and became the assistant coach at the club instead.

== Coaching career ==
Seifert began working as an assistant coach at Ystads IF in 2013, and the following season he took on the role of head coach. From 2019 to 2023, Seifert was the head coach of the IFK Ystad club. In October 2024 he was hired as the head coach of his former club KIF Kolding to replace the fired Christian Hjermind. The team was at the time battling relegation neck and neck with Grindsted at the bottom of the table. He was in turn fired from the job in March 2025 due to disappointing results. The team was at the time in last place in the Danish League. Despite his dismissal, the team was still relegated on the last day of the season. This was the first time the club was relegated in 41 years.
