= Robert Andersson (handballer) =

Swedish handball player (born 1969)

Personal information
- Nationality: Swedish
- Born: 24 November 1969 (age 56) Ystad, Sweden
- Height: 1.91 m (6 ft 3 in)

Sport
- Sport: Handball
- Position: Right back
- Current club: Retired

Senior clubs
- Years: Team
- -1990: IFK Ystad HK
- 1990-1992: Ystads IF HF
- 1992-1995: TSV Bayer Dormagen
- 1995-1996: RTV 1879 Basel
- 1996-1998: OSC Rheinhausen
- 1998-2003: HSG Nordhorn
- 2003-2004: TuS N-Lübbecke
- 2004-2008: LUGI HF
- 2008: Ystads IF HF
National team
Years	Team	Apps	(Gls)
1992-2000	Sweden	139	(259)

Teams managed
- 2009-2013: IFK Ystad HK
- 2013-2015: H 43 Lund
- 2015-2017: HC Erlangen
- 2018-2020: HIF Karlskrona
- 2020-2023: TuS Ferndorf
Medal record
Olympic Games
Men's Handball
Silver medal – second place	1992 Barcelona	Team
Silver medal – second place	1996 Atlanta	Team
European Championship
Gold medal – first place	1994 Portugal
Gold medal – first place	1998 Italy
World Championship
Bronze medal – third place	1995 Iceland

Robert Andersson (born 24 November 1969) is a Swedish handball player, who won the European championship with Sweden. He goes by the nickname 'Knirr'.

== Career ==
Anderssons senior debut was at his hometown club IFK Ystad HK. He then joined city rivals Ystads IF HF, where he won the 1991-92 Swedish championship. In that season he was the league top scorer with 189 goals.

This prompted a move to German Bundesliga team TSV Bayer Dormagen, where he played for three years before joining Swiss team RTV 1879 Basel. In 1996 he returned to Germany to join OSC Rheinhausen. After Rheinhausen had to withdraw from the Bundesliga due to financial trouble, he joined 2nd Bundesliga team HSG Nordhorn. In 1999 he was promoted with the team to the Bundesliga and in the 2001-2002 season he came second in the Bundesliga. As his contract ran out at the end of the season, he joined TuS N-Lübbecke in January 2023.

In 2005 he returned to Sweden to join LUGI HF. In 2008 he joined Ystads IF again, where he retired in 2008 due to a shoulder injury.

With the Swedish national team he won the 1994 and 1998 European Championships.

He represented Sweden in the 1996 Summer Olympics and in the 2000 Summer Olympics, where Sweden took silver medals both times. In 1992 he was a member of the Swedish handball team won the silver medal in the Olympic tournament. He played six match and scored six goals.

Four years later he was part of the Swedish team which won the silver medal again. He played two matches and scored one goal.

== Coaching career ==
When he retired as a player he became the coach at IFK Ystad HK. In 2013 he moved to coach recently promoted team H 43 Lund.

In March 2015 he became the coach at German Bundesliga team HC Erlangen, where he replaced Frank Bergemann. He was relieved of his duties in October 2017 due to not getting the expected results.

In the summer of 2018 he became the head coach of Swedish team HIF Karlskrona. Between 2020 and 2023 he coached the German team TuS Ferndorf.

== Private life ==
His son Julius Lindskog Andersson is also a handball player.
