= Lukas Sandell =

Swedish handball player (born 1997)

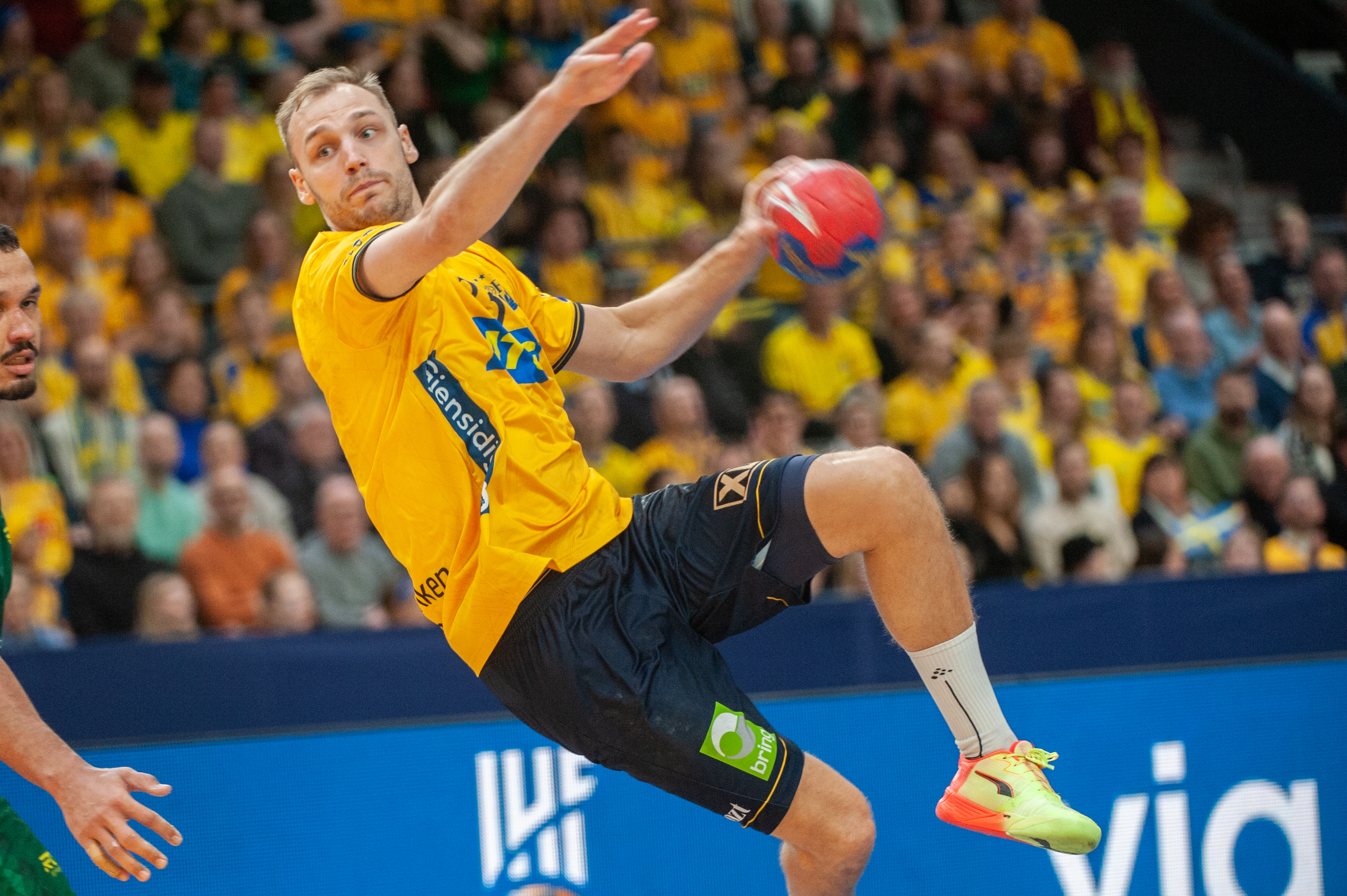
- Sandell in 2023

Personal information
- Nationality: Swedish
- Born: 3 February 1997 (age 29) Eslöv, Sweden
- Height: 1.93 m (6 ft 4 in)

Sport
- Sport: Handball
- Position: Right back
- Current club: Rhein-Neckar Löwen

Youth career
- Years: Team
- -2013: Eslövs HF

Senior clubs
- Years: Team
- 2013–2018: Ystads IF
- 2018–2020: Elverum Håndball
- 2020–2023: Aalborg Håndbold
- 2023–2025: ONE Veszprém
- 2025–2026: Rhein-Neckar Löwen
- 2026–: OTP Bank-Pick Szeged
National team
Years	Team	Apps	(Gls)
2021–	Sweden	78	(202)
Medal record
World Championship
Silver medal – second place	2021 Egypt
European Championship
Gold medal – first place	2022 Hungary/Slovakia
Bronze medal – third place	2024 Germany
- Updated on 14 January 2026

Lukas Sandell (born 3 February 1997) is a Swedish handball player for Rhein-Neckar Löwen and the Swedish national team.

== Career ==
Sandell started playing handball at Eslövs HF. In 2013 he switched to Ystads IF HF. He debuted for the senior team in 2015, where he shared the right back position with Kim Andersson.

In 2018 he transferred to Norwegian team Elverum Håndball. Here he won the Norwegian championship in 2019 and 2020 and the Norwegian cup in 2019 and 2020.

In 2020 he joined Danish team Aalborg Håndbold. In his first season at the club, he reached the Champions League final, where Aalborg lost to FC Barcelona 23-36. Only days later he won the Danish Championship final.

In 2023 he joined ONE Veszprém. Here he won the Hungarian Cup and the IHF Men's Super Globe in 2024.

=== National team ===
Sandell debuted for the Swedish national team at the 2021 World Men's Handball Championship in a match against Macedonia. Here he won a silver medal with the Swedish team.

At the 2022 European Championship he won gold medals with Sweden.

== Achievements ==
- EHF Champions League
  - Runner-up: 2021
- IHF Super Globe
  - Winner: 2024
  - Bronze medal: 2021
- Danish Handball League
  - Winner: 2021
  - Runner-up: 2022, 2023
- Danish Handball Cup:
  - Winner: 2021
  - Runner-up: 2020
- Danish Super Cup
  - Winner: 2020, 2021, 2022
- Norwegian League
  - Winner: 2019, 2020
- Norwegian Cup
  - Winner: 2018, 2019
- Hungarian Cup
  - Winner: 2024
