= Önnereds HK =

Swedish handball club

- Full name: Önnereds Handbollsklubb
- Short name: ÖHK
- Founded: 5 June 1985
- Arena: ÖHK-hallen, Gothenburg
- Capacity: 1,500
- President: Fredrik Blomberg
- Head coach: Pontus Ward Wiklund (men's); Niklas Virolainen (women's)
- League: Handbollsligan
- 2025–26: 9th (men's); 3th (women's)
- Club colours
Home	Away

Önnereds HK is a handball club based in Gothenburg, Sweden. Around 60 teams are organized in the club.

Since 1965, handball has been played in the Gothenburg district of Önnered. In 1985, the club was split into a football and a handball department. The handball club moved to the Älvsborg district. In 1992, the ÖHK-hallen was built, which has been the club's home ground since then and now hold up to 1000 spectators. In addition to the large hall, the club also has two smaller ones.

The women's team played in the top Swedish division, the Elitserien, in the 2009/10 season. After being relegated in Summer 2010, they compete in the Allsvenskan. From 2013 to 2016, the team appeared again in the Elitserien. After a season in the Allsvenskan, the women's team were promoted once again. The men's team were also promoted to the Handbollsligan in 2013, in which the team competed until 2015. In 2018, they returned to the Handbollsligan. In the 2024-25 season they reached the final of the Swedish Championship, but lost 3-0 to IK Sävehof.

== Men's team ==
=== Current squad ===
Squad for the 2026–27 season

Goalkeepers
Left Wingers
Right Wingers
Line players

Left Backs

- (Sweden) Emil Hansson

Central Backs

- (Sweden) Razmus Nyman

Right Backs

=== Transfers ===
Transfers for the 2026–27 season

Joining

- (Sweden) Razmus Nyman (CB) from (Sweden) HK Aranäs

Leaving

- (Norway) Mishels Liaba (LB) to (Norway) Kolstad Håndball
- (Denmark) Patrick Bols (GK) to (Sweden) OV Helsingborg HK
- (Sweden) Pontus Zetterman (RB) to (Sweden) HK Varberg
- (Sweden) Hugo Forsberg (CB) to (Romania) CS Minaur Baia Mare
- (Sweden) Linus Karlsson (GK) to (Sweden) Skånela IF

=== Transfer History ===
Transfers for the 2025–26 season

Joining

- (Sweden) Emil Hansson (LB) from (Germany) 1. VfL Potsdam

Leaving

- (Sweden) Pelle Segertoft (LB) to (Denmark) Fredericia HK
- (Sweden) Jesper Filén (LW) to (Sweden) Västerås HF
- (Sweden) Rasmus Thomsen (LP) to (Sweden) IF Hallby
- (Sweden) William Bengtsson (LP) to (Sweden) OV Helsingborg HK
- (Sweden) Linus Eriksson Lilja (RW) to (Sweden) Vinslövs HK

== Women's team ==
=== Current squad ===
Squad for the 2026–27 season

Goalkeepers

- 12 (Sweden) Maja Witzke Wahlgren
- 16 (Sweden) Elina Martinsson

Wingers
LW

- 5 (Sweden) Elin Leissner
- 25 (Sweden) Lilja Olsbo

RW

- 14 (Sweden) Andrea Litstrand
- 28 (Sweden) Lovis Jansson

Line players

- 11 (Sweden) Alma Jöhnsson
- 17 (Sweden) Ebba Lundstedt
- 98 (Sweden) Molly Bergenkling

Back players
LB

- 4 (Sweden) Elin Sandberg
- 23 (Sweden) Ketsia Mumbongo

CB

- 8 (Sweden) Moa Andersson
- 10 (Sweden) Alva Ahlgren
- 13 (Sweden) Ida Sohtell
- 24 (Sweden) Elin Österwall

RB

- 19 (Sweden) Moa Wallin
- 22 (Sweden) Kristina Zubonja
