= Hedin (surname) =

Hedin is a Swedish surname that may refer to:

- Adolf Hedin (1834–1905), Swedish liberal politician
- Pierre Hedin (born 1978), Swedish ice hockey player
- Robert Hedin (born 1966), Swedish handball coach and retired player
- Roza Güclü Hedin (born 1982), Swedish politician
- Sven Hedin (1862–1952), Swedish geographer and explorer
- Sven Fredrik Hedin (1923–2004), Swedish diplomat
- Tony Hedin (born 1969), Swedish handball coach and retired player, brother of Robert
- Tore Hedin (1927–1952), Swedish police officer and murderer
- Nana Hedin (born 1968), Swedish singer
- Ulrika Hedin (born 1952), Swedish Olympic equestrian
- Zelma Hedin (1827–1874), Swedish actress
- Clint Hedin (born 1978), American entrepreneur

== See also ==
- Heðin
