= Ystads IF =

Swedish handball club

- Full name: Ystads Idrottsförening Handbollsförening
- Short name: YIF
- Founded: 1908; 118 years ago
- Arena: Ystad Arena, Ystad
- Capacity: 2,700
- League: Handbollsligan
- 2024–25: 1st place, gold medalist(s)
- Club colours
Home	Away

Ystads IF is a professional handball club from Ystad, Sweden. They play in Handbollsligan. They won the Swedish Championship in 1976, 1992, 2022 and 2025.

Location of Ystads IF

== History ==
=== 1908-1960 ===
Ystads IF was founded in 1908 and took up handball on the programme in 1929. In 1933–34, the club won an unofficial six-team league consisting of teams from the cities of Ystad and Kristianstad. In the same season, they made their debut in Svenska mästerskapet (SM), a tournament held to determine the Swedish Champions. They were eliminated by Flottans IF Karlskrona in their first match. Ystads IF played in the highest division, at the time known as Allsvenskan, for the first time in 1940–41, but were relegated after one season. They were promoted again in 1943 and in the same season reached the semi-finals of SM, where they were defeated by Västerås HF. In 1945–46, Ystads IF finished second in the league. They reached the SM semi-finals in 1946–47, but lost to Redbergslids IK. They were relegated from Allsvenskan in the following season. They played in Allsvenskan again from 1954 to 1957.

=== 1960-1985 ===
Ystads IF were promoted back to Allsvenskan in 1968 and finished fourth in the league in 1968–69. By this time, the SM tournament had been discontinued and the Swedish Champions were determined by a playoffs tournament between the four highest-placed teams in the league. They defeated HK Drott in the semi-finals but lost against SoIK Hellas in the finals. They were relegated in 1972 but promoted again after a single season. In 1975–76, Ystads IF finished second in the league and won their first Swedish Championship, winning against IFK Malmö in the semi-finals and IK Heim in the finals. Two years later, they won the regular season but lost the semi-finals against Lugi HF. In 1978–79, they finished second in the league and lost the finals against Drott. In the following season they finished second in the league again and also again lost the finals, this time to Lugi. They won the regular season in 1980–81, but lost their third consecutive final, against Vikingarnas IF. Ystads IF finished second in the league in 1981–82 and 1982–83 and won the league in 1983–84, but were eliminated in the semi-finals in each of those seasons.

=== 1985-Present day ===
They reached the playoffs again in 1986–87 and 1987–88, but were defeated by Redbergslids IK in the semi-finals both times. In 1990–91, they finished third in the league, which had been renamed Elitserien and with the playoffs having been expanded to six teams. They eliminated Redbergslid in the quarter-finals but lost against Irsta HF in the semi-finals. In 1991–92, Ystads IF won the regular season and also their second Swedish Championship, defeating Drott in the final series. In the following season they finished third in Elitserien, and their title defence ended in the semi-finals against IK Sävehof. In 1993–94 they were relegated from Elitserien. They were promoted in the following season but were relegated again a year later. They did not return to Elitserien until 2006. By this time the playoffs hand been expanded to eight teams. They finished fifth in the league, but were eliminated by Redbergslid in the quarter-finals. Since returning to the top division, Ystads IF have reached the semi-finals in 2007–08, 2009–10, 2011–12, 2014–15, 2015–16 and 2016–17, but lost each time. In 2021–22 they reached the finals, and managed to win their first Swedish Championship in 30 years.

== Crest, colours, supporters ==
=== Kits ===
HOME
2014–15	2015–17	2018–22	2022–23

AWAY
2014–15	2015–17	2017–18	2018–19	2020–21	2021–22

== Sports Hall information ==
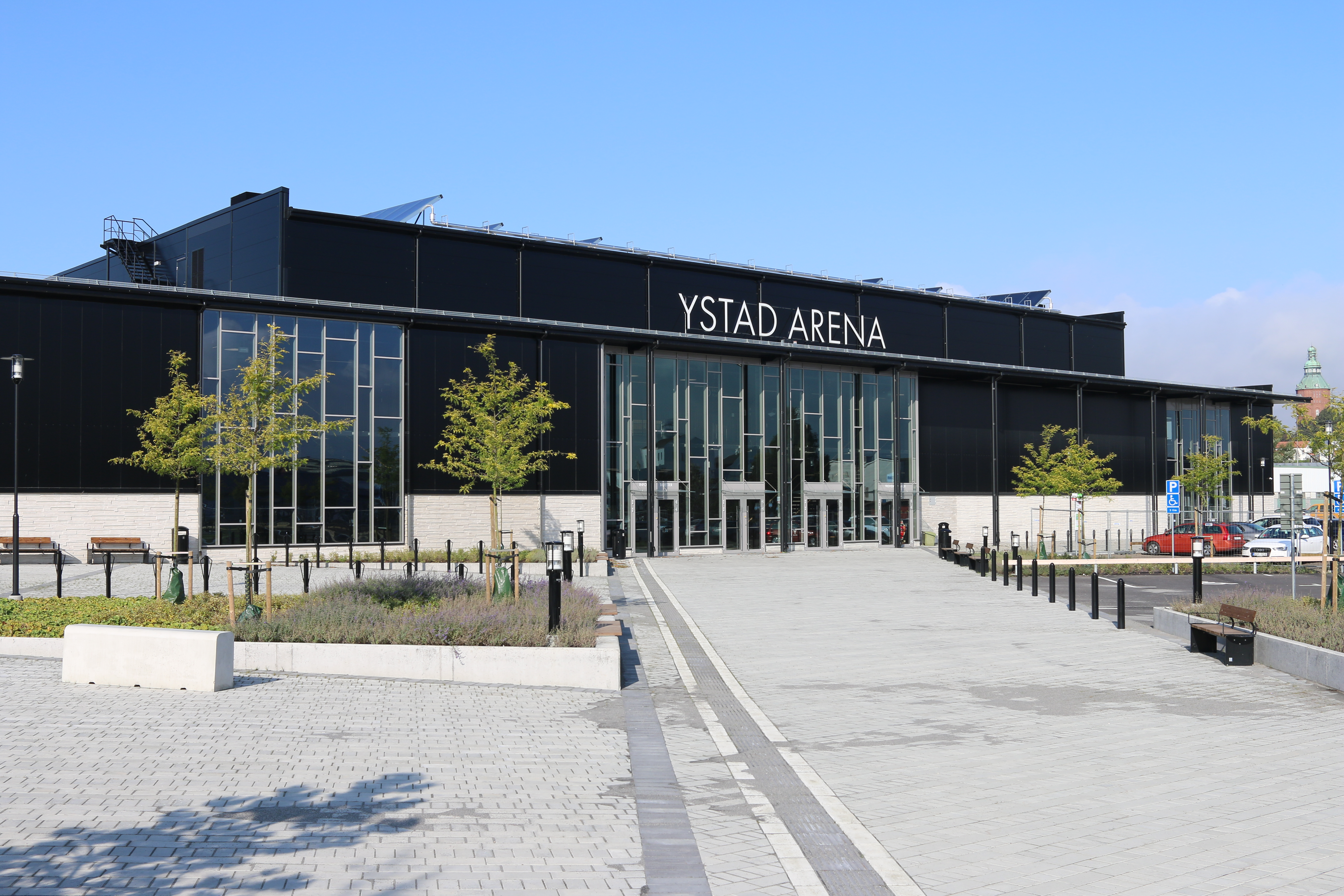
Home hall: Ystad Arena

- Name: – Ystad Arena
- City: – Ystad
- Capacity: – 2700
- Address: – Fridhemsgatan 27, 271 45 Ystad, Sweden

== Team ==
=== Current squad ===
Squad for the 2022–23 season

Ystads IF

Goalkeepers

- 1 (Sweden) Niklas Kraft
- 16 (Sweden) Erik Hvenfelt
- 30 (Sweden) Marcus Gustavsson

Left Wingers

- 9 (Sweden) Linus Fernebrand
- 17 (Sweden) Johan Dahlin

Right Wingers

- 19 (Sweden) Jonathan Andersson
- 22 (Norway) Ebbe Stankiewicz
- 23 (Sweden) Hampus Karlsson

Line Players

- 2 (Sweden) Anton Månsson
- 3 (Sweden) Christoffer Svensson
- 13 (Denmark) Mads Kalstrup Honoré
- 18 (Denmark) Knud Ronau Larsen

Left Backs

- 4 (Sweden) Philip Stenmalm
- 10 (Sweden) Albin Fingal
- 28 (Sweden) Jonathan Svensson
- 34 (Sweden) Jonathan Engström
- 63 (Sweden) Mikael Helmersson

Central Backs

- 7 (Sweden) Oskar Svensson
- 32 (Sweden) Julius Lindskog Andersson

Right Backs

- 5 (Sweden) Kim Andersson
- 6 (Sweden) Jakob Nygren
- 27 (Sweden) Kasper Palmar

=== Technical staff ===
- Head coach: (Sweden) Oscar Carlén
- Assistant coach: (Sweden) Marcus Lindgren
- Goalkeeping coach: (Sweden) Mattias Andersson
- Fitness coach: (Sweden) Philip Åkesson
- Physiotherapist: (Sweden) Jesper Lindgren

=== Transfers ===
Transfers for the 2026–27 season

Joining

- (Denmark) Tim Hjorth Rantala (LP) from (Denmark) Nordsjælland Håndbold

Leaving

- (Sweden) Nils Persson (LW) to (Sweden) IFK Ystad HK
- (Sweden) Holger Mårtensson (CB) to (Sweden) HK Varberg
- (Sweden) Melvin Seifert (CB) to (Sweden) IK Lågan

=== Transfer History ===
Transfers for the 2025–26 season

Joining

- (Sweden) Oskar Arnell (GK) from (Sweden) Lugi HF
- (Sweden) Gustav Naslund (RB) from (Sweden) Skånela IF

Leaving

- (Denmark) Kristian Olsen (RB) to (Portugal) S.L. Benfica
- (Norway) Carl Tönnesen (RB) to (Sweden) HK Malmö
- (Sweden) Erik Hvenfelt (GK) to (Denmark) Nordsjælland Håndbold
- (Sweden) Viggo Håkansson (GK) to (Sweden) Lugi HF
- (Sweden) Oskar Joelsson (LB) to (Germany) ThSV Eisenach

== Previous Squads ==
2021–2022 Team
Shirt No	Nationality	Player	Birth Date	Position
1	Sweden	Niklas Kraft	22 March 1994 (age 32)	Goalkeeper
2	Sweden	Anton Månsson	9 January 1989 (age 37)	Line Player
3	Sweden	Christoffer Svensson	24 May 1993 (age 33)	Line Player
4	Sweden	Philip Stenmalm	3 March 1992 (age 34)	Left Back
5	Sweden	Kim Andersson	21 August 1982 (age 44)	Right Back
6	Sweden	Jakob Nygren	14 January 1992 (age 34)	Right Back
8	Sweden	Hampus Andersson	24 September 1993 (age 33)	Left Winger
9	Sweden	Edvin Persson	3 April 2002 (age 24)	Central Back
12	Sweden	Pontus Encrantz	1 June 2001 (age 25)	Goalkeeper
16	Sweden	Erik Hvenfelt	16 September 1999 (age 27)	Goalkeeper
17	Sweden	Johan Dahlin	11 March 1996 (age 30)	Left Winger
18	Denmark	Knud Ronau Larsen	7 January 1998 (age 28)	Line Player
20	Sweden	Erik Svensson	28 March 2000 (age 26)	Left Winger
22	Sweden	Jim Andersson	3 September 1993 (age 33)	Right Winger
23	Sweden	Hampus Karlsson	23 February 2001 (age 25)	Right Winger
27	Sweden	Kasper Palmar	27 October 2003 (age 22)	Right Back
28	Sweden	Jonathan Svensson	27 January 1998 (age 28)	Left Back
30	Sweden	Marcus Gustavsson	3 July 2003 (age 23)	Goalkeeper
32	Sweden	Julius Lindskog Andersson	21 July 1994 (age 32)	Central Back
33	Sweden	Dalibor Doder	24 May 1979 (age 47)	Central Back
34	Sweden	Jonathan Engström	3 April 2002 (age 24)	Left Back
36	Sweden	Hugo Andersson	1 January 2003 (age 23)	Line Player
37	Sweden	Albin Fingal	27 April 2003 (age 23)	Left Back
39	Sweden	Jonathan Andersson	18 January 2004 (age 22)	Right Winger

2020–2021 Team
Shirt No	Nationality	Player	Birth Date	Position
1	Sweden	Niklas Kraft	22 March 1994 (age 32)	Goalkeeper
2	Sweden	Ludvig Hallbäck	27 October 2000 (age 25)	Central Back
3	Sweden	Christoffer Svensson	24 May 1993 (age 33)	Line Player
4	Sweden	Herman Hugosson	6 December 1991 (age 34)	Line Player
5	Sweden	Kim Andersson	21 August 1982 (age 44)	Right Back
6	Sweden	Jakob Nygren	14 January 1992 (age 34)	Right Back
7	Sweden	Vilhelm Ernst	14 May 2001 (age 25)	Left Back
8	Sweden	Hampus Andersson	24 September 1993 (age 33)	Left Winger
9	Sweden	Theo Johansson	8 August 2001 (age 25)	Line Player
10	Sweden	Edvin Persson	3 April 2002 (age 24)	Central Back
11	Sweden	Albin Broman	18 January 2001 (age 25)	Right Back
12	Sweden	Pontus Encrantz	1 June 2001 (age 25)	Goalkeeper
13	Norway	Lasse Indergaard Balstad	13 January 1994 (age 32)	Left Back
14	Sweden	Filip Pettersson	7 July 1999 (age 27)	Right Winger
15	Sweden	Truls Landgren	3 June 2000 (age 26)	Central Back
16	Sweden	Erik Hvenfelt	16 September 1999 (age 27)	Goalkeeper
17	Sweden	Johan Dahlin	11 March 1996 (age 30)	Left Winger
18	Denmark	Knud Ronau Larsen	7 January 1998 (age 28)	Line Player
20	Sweden	Erik Svensson	28 March 2000 (age 26)	Left Winger
21	Sweden	Oscar Jensen	20 December 1982 (age 43)	Goalkeeper
22	Sweden	Jim Andersson	3 September 1993 (age 33)	Right Winger
23	Sweden	Hampus Karlsson	23 February 2001 (age 25)	Right Winger
27	Sweden	Kasper Palmar	27 October 2003 (age 22)	Right Back
28	Sweden	Jonathan Svensson	27 January 1998 (age 28)	Left Back
30	Sweden	Marcus Gustavsson	3 July 2003 (age 23)	Goalkeeper
33	Sweden	Dalibor Doder	24 May 1979 (age 47)	Central Back

2015–2016 Team
Shirt No	Nationality	Player	Birth Date	Position
1	Sweden	Anders Persson	20 September 1982 (age 44)	Goalkeeper
3	Denmark	Martin Bager	14 January 1982 (age 44)	Line Player
4	Sweden	Herman Hugosson	6 December 1991 (age 34)	Line Player
5	Sweden	Kim Andersson	21 August 1982 (age 44)	Right Back
6	Sweden	Emil Hansson	7 May 1997 (age 29)	Central Back
7	Sweden	Linus Andersson	21 August 1996 (age 30)	Right Winger
8	Sweden	Hampus Andersson	24 September 1993 (age 33)	Left Winger
9	Sweden	Oscar Zareba	2 December 1992 (age 33)	Central Back
11	Sweden	Lukas Sandell	3 February 1997 (age 29)	Right Back
12	Sweden	Mans Landgren	2 May 1998 (age 28)	Goalkeeper
15	Sweden	Alexander Borgstedt	11 June 1986 (age 40)	Left Back
16	Sweden	Andreas Björkman Myhr	6 January 1996 (age 30)	Goalkeeper
17	Sweden	Johan Dahlin	11 March 1996 (age 30)	Left Winger
18	Sweden	Linus Ekberg	3 January 1996 (age 30)	Central Back
20	Sweden	Viktor Hedin	30 December 1998 (age 27)	Central Back
21	Sweden	Freddy Andersson	3 April 1998 (age 28)	Right Winger
22	Sweden	Julius Martinsson	29 June 1992 (age 34)	Central Back
23	Sweden	Anton Andersson	21 September 1993 (age 33)	Right Winger
24	Sweden	Lukas Nilsson	16 November 1996 (age 29)	Left Back
25	Sweden	Simon Kjällstrom	15 April 1998 (age 28)	Left Back
26	Sweden	Emilio Garro	1 June 1996 (age 30)	Line Player
27	Sweden	Anton Hallbäck	15 January 1996 (age 30)	Right Back
55	Sweden	Philip Nilsson	27 January 1989 (age 37)	Left Winger

== European record ==
=== EHF European Cup ===
The EHF European Cup is an annual men's handball club competition organised by the European Handball Federation (EHF). It is the third-tier competition of European club handball, after the EHF Champions League and the EHF European League. Founded in 1993 as the EHF City Cup, it was renamed EHF Challenge Cup in 2000, and EHF European Cup from the 2020–21 season.

Season	Round	Club	Home	Away	Aggregate
2020–21; Finalist	Round 2	(Lithuania) VHC Šviesa	36–33	36–29	72–62
2020–21; Finalist	Round 3	(Estonia) HC Tallinn	30–21	27–24	57–45
2020–21; Finalist	Round 4	(Austria) SG Handball West Wien	wo.		
2020–21; Finalist	Quarter-finals	(Estonia) Põlva Serviti	29–25	33–28	62–53
2020–21; Finalist	Semi-finals	(Cyprus) Sabbianco Anorthosis Famagusta	26–22	24–26	50–48
2020–21; Finalist	Finals	(Greece) AEK Athens	20–24	26–30	46–54

=== EHF ranking ===
As of 5/12/2025

Rank	Team	Points
55	(Denmark) SAH Aarhus	98
56	(Finland) BK-46	98
57	(Ukraine) HC Motor Zaporizhzhia	93
58	(Sweden) Ystads IF	93
59	(Croatia) MRK Sesvete	89
60	(Slovenia) RK Trimo Trebnje	88
61	(Greece) AC Diomidis Argous	84

== Former club members ==
=== Notable former players ===
- (Sweden) Kim Andersson (1998–2001, 2015–)
- (Sweden) Mattias Andersson (1985–1998)
- (Sweden) Robert Andersson (1990–1992)
- (Sweden) Oscar Carlén (2005–2008)
- (Sweden) Per Carlén (1991–2000)
- (Sweden) (Bosnia and Herzegovina) Josip Cavar (2014–2016)
- (Sweden) Dalibor Doder (2019–2022)
- (Sweden) Niclas Ekberg (2009–2010)
- (Sweden) Jim Gottfridsson (2011–2013)
- (Sweden) Pierre Hammarstrand (2007–2014)
- (Sweden) Robert Hedin (1982–1990, 2003–2004)
- (Sweden) Tony Hedin (1987–1993, 2002–2004)
- (Sweden) Kurt-Göran Kjell (1962–1963, 1968–1969)
- (Sweden) Fredrik Larsson (2004–2005)
- (Sweden) Magnus Lindén (2006–2010)
- (Sweden) Anton Månsson (2021–)
- (Sweden) Lukas Nilsson (2013–2016)
- (Sweden) Fredrik Ohlander (2012–2014)
- (Sweden) Mats Olsson (1994–1996)
- (Sweden) Anders Persson (2007–2008, 2014–2020)
- (Sweden) Carl Basti Rasmussen (1974–1991)
- (Sweden) Lukas Sandell (2013–2018)
- (Sweden) Sebastian Seifert (2009–2013)
- (Sweden) Philip Stenmalm (2021–)
- (Denmark) Martin Bager (2011–2016)
- (Denmark) Henrik Knudsen (2019–2020)
- (Estonia) Kaupo Palmar (2008–2009)

=== Former coaches ===
Seasons	Coach	Country
1986–1988	Caj-Åke Andersson	(Sweden)
1988–1993	Kent-Harry Andersson	(Sweden)
1993–1999	Carl Basti Rasmussen	(Sweden)
1999–2002	Sten Sjögren	(Sweden)
2004–2007	Robert Hedin	(Sweden)
2007–2010	Torben Winther	(Denmark)
2010	Pelle Käll	(Sweden)
2010–2013	Carl Basti Rasmussen	(Sweden)
2013–2017	Sebastian Seifert	(Sweden)
2020–	Oscar Carlén	(Sweden)
