= Philip Stenmalm =

Swedish handball player (born 1992)

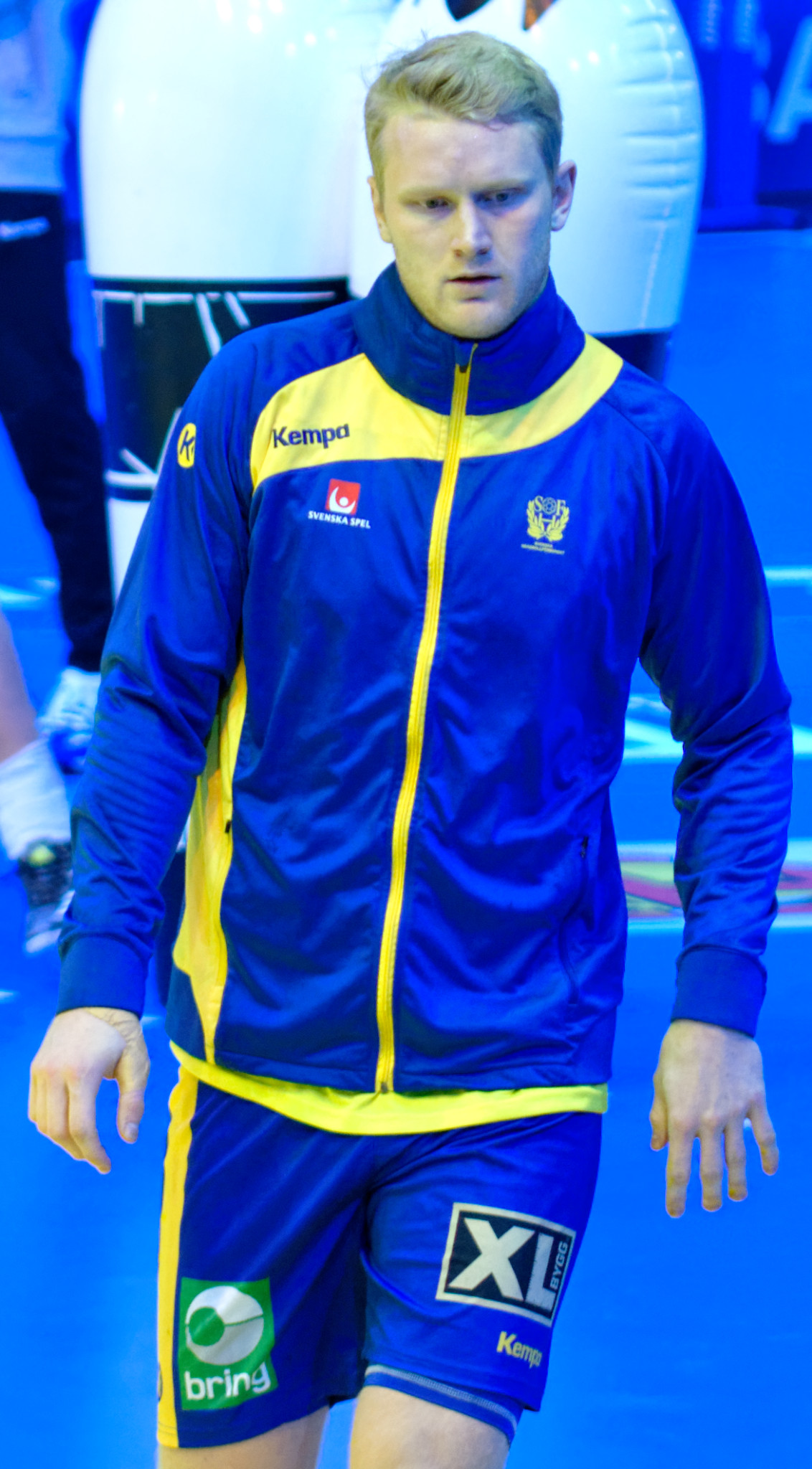

Personal information
- Nationality: Swedish
- Born: 3 March 1992 (age 34) Växjö, Sweden
- Height: 2.00 m (6 ft 7 in)

Sport
- Sport: Handball
- Position: Left back
- Current club: Ystads IF
- Number: 4

Youth career
- Years: Team
- 2005–2011: Växjö HF

Senior clubs
- Years: Team
- 2011–2014: HK Drott
- 2014–2016: CB Ciudad de Logroño
- 2016–2018: KIF Kolding København
- 2018–2019: Pays d'Aix UC
- 2019–2021: Wisła Płock
- 2021–: Ystads IF
National team
Years	Team	Apps	(Gls)
2013–	Sweden	45	(61)
Medal record
Youth World Championship
Bronze medal – third place	2011 Argentina
Junior World Championship
Gold medal – first place	2013 Bosnia and Herzegovina

Philip Stenmalm (born 3 March 1992) is a Swedish handball player who plays for Ystads IF and the Swedish national team.

At the 2013 Men's Junior World Handball Championship he was chosen as MVP. He competed at the 2016 European Men's Handball Championship.

He is the older brother of fellow handball player Elliot Stenmalm.
