= Emil Hansson (handballer, born 1997) =

Swedish handball player

Personal information
- Full name: Lars Emil Anton Hansson
- Nationality: Swedish
- Born: 7 May 1997 (age 29) Ystad, Sweden
- Height: 1.98 m (6 ft 6 in)

Sport
- Sport: Handball
- Position: Left Back / Centre Back
- Current club: VfL Potsdam
- Number: 2

Youth career
- Years: Team
- –: Ystads IF

Senior clubs
- Years: Team
- 2014–2018: Ystads IF
- 2018–2019: IFK Kristianstad
- 2019–2021: IFK Ystad
- 2021–2022: Mors-Thy Håndbold
- 2022–: VfL Potsdam

Lars Emil Anton Hansson, (born 7 May 1997) is a Swedish handball player, currently playing for VfL Potsdam.

He played for Ystads IF until 2018, when he signed for IFK Kristianstad. He played there for the season of 2018/19, and started the season of 2019/20 with them. However, in November 2019 it was announced he was leaving IFK Kristianstad for IFK Ystad right away. In 2020 he signed with the Danish Mors-Thy Håndbold, starting 2021/22.

Between 2013 and 2017 he played for the Swedish U19 and U21 national teams, with a total of 45 games and 64 goals.
