= Jim Gottfridsson =

Swedish handball player (born 1992)

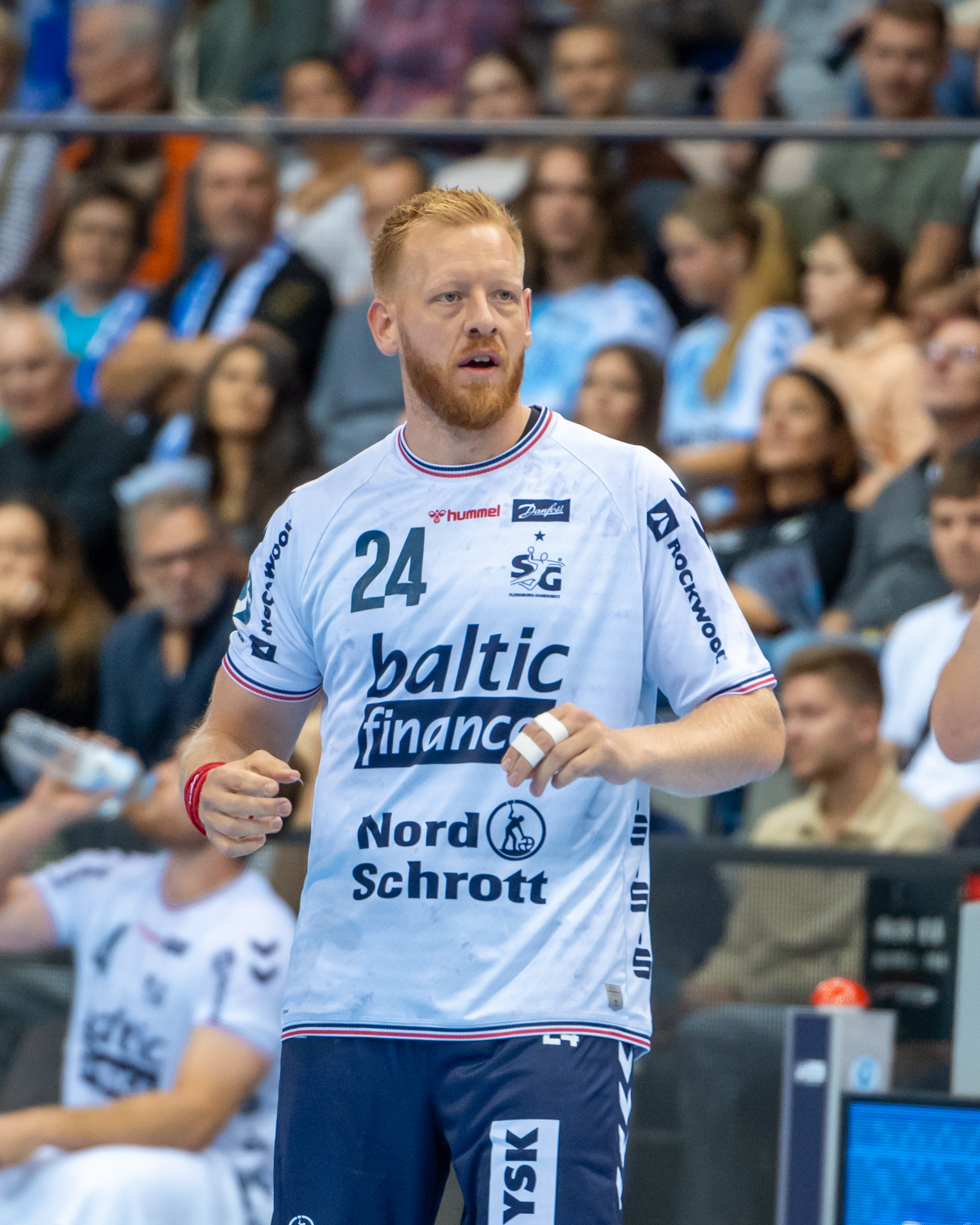
- Gottfridsson in 2024

Personal information
- Nationality: Swedish
- Born: 2 September 1992 (age 34) Ystad, Sweden
- Height: 1.91 m (6 ft 3 in)

Sport
- Sport: Handball
- Position: Centre back
- Current club: IFK Ystad
- Number: 24

Youth career
- Years: Team
- 1996–2010: IFK Ystad

Senior clubs
- Years: Team
- 2010–2011: IFK Ystad
- 2011–2013: Ystads IF
- 2013–2025: SG Flensburg-Handewitt
- 2025–04/2026: OTP Bank-Pick Szeged
- 04/2026–: IFK Ystad
National team
Years	Team	Apps	(Gls)
2012–	Sweden	176	(535)
Medal record
World Championship
Silver medal – second place	2021 Egypt
European Championship
Gold medal – first place	2022 Hungary/Slovakia
Silver medal – second place	2018 Croatia
Bronze medal – third place	2024 Germany
- Updated on 14 January 2026

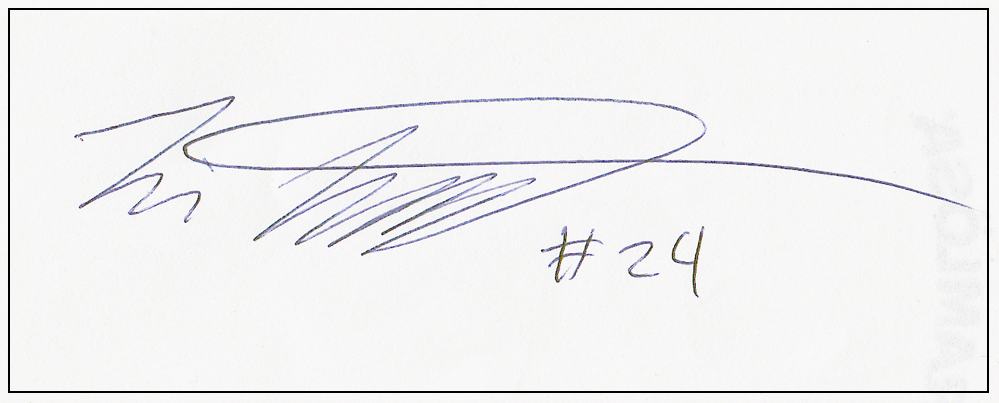
Jim Gottfridsson's autograph, 2013

Jim Gottfridsson (born 2 September 1992) is a Swedish handball player for the Swedish national team.

Considered one of the best players in the world, he has won five titles at club level, including the EHF Champions League, league championships and cup titles.

With the national team, Gottfridsson won the 2022 European Championship, finished as runner-up at the 2018 European Championship and the 2021 World Championship, and placed third at the 2024 European Championship. He was named most valuable player (MVP) of the European Championship in 2018 and 2022, and voted best centre back of the World Championship in 2021. Gottfridsson represented Sweden at the 2016 and 2020 Summer Olympics.

== Career ==
In 1996 and aged four, Gottfridsson joined home town club IFK Ystad. In 2011, he joined top division team Ystads IF. After two years, he signed for German team SG Flensburg-Handewitt. In his first season, he won the EHF Champions League with SG by defeating arch-rivals THW Kiel 30–28 in the final.

In the following years, Gottfridsson won the DHB-Pokal (2015) and the German championship twice (2018, 2019). He was voted MVP of the 2020–21 season.

Gottfridsson was nominated as IHF World Player of the Year for 2021, finishing second in the vote behind Niklas Landin.

In summer 2025 he joined Hungagian side Pick Szeged after 12 years at Flensburg-Handewitt. He has stated that among his reasons for leaving the club is the fact, that he has not felt appreciated and important enough to the team after seeing less playing time under Danish coach Nicolej Krickau. In April 2026 Pick Szeged decided to unilaterally cancel Gottfridsons contract; a decision which he protested saying that 'the club had taken the decision without consulting him' and that he considers the decision to be 'unlawful'.

== Honours ==
=== Club ===
- EHF Champions League
  - Gold: 2014
- EHF European League
  - Gold: 2024, 2025
- Handball-Bundesliga
  - Gold: 2018, 2019
  - Silver: 2016, 2017, 2020, 2021
  - Bronze: 2014, 2015
- DHB-Pokal
  - Gold: 2015
  - Silver: 2014, 2016, 2017
- DHB-Supercup:
  - Gold: 2019
  - Silver: 2015, 2018, 2020

=== International ===
- EHF European Championship
  - Gold: 2022
  - Silver: 2018
  - Bronze: 2024
- IHF World Championship
  - Silver: 2021

=== Individual ===
- All-Star Centre back of the World Championship: 2021
- Most Valuable Player (MVP) of the European Championship: 2018, 2022
- Most Valuable Player (MVP) of the Handball-Bundesliga: 2020–21
- Swedish Handballer of the Year: 2018, 2022
- Handball-Planet – Best World Handball Player: 2022
