= Robert Hedin =

Swedish handball player and coach (born 1966)

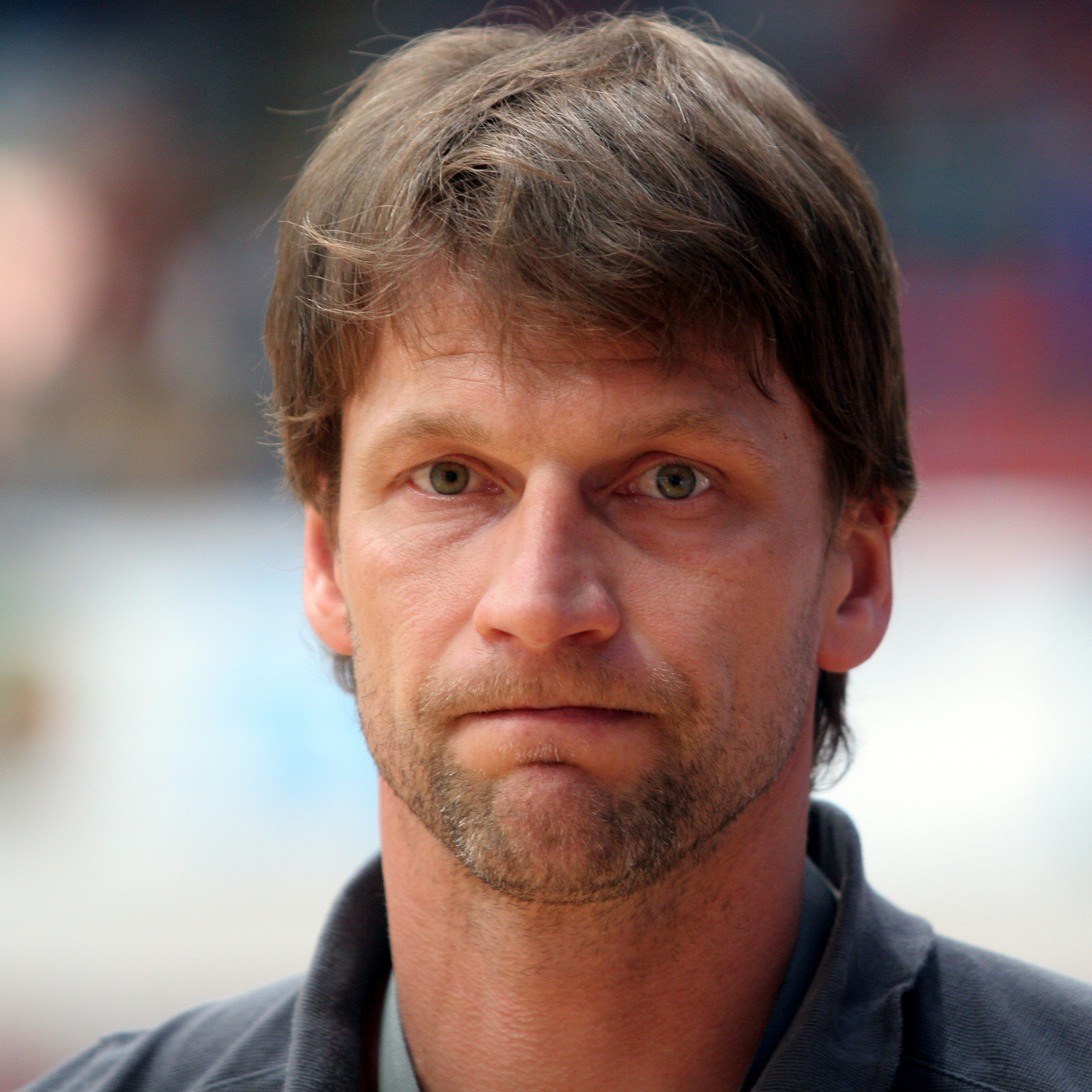
- Hedin in 2009

Personal information
- Born: 2 February 1966 (age 60) Ystad, Sweden
- Height: 198 cm (78 in)
- Weight: 97 kg (214 lb)

Sport
- Sport: Handball
- Position: left back

Youth career
- Years: Team
- –: Köpingebro IF
- 1980-1982: IFK Ystad
- 1982-1985: Ystads IF

Senior clubs
- Years: Team
- 1985–1990: Ystads IF
- 1990–1992: Stavanger IF
- 1992–1993: BM Benidorm
- 1993–1998: GWD Minden
- 1998–2001: TSV St. Otmar St. Gallen
- 2001–2002: SV Post Schwerin
- 2002–2003: TuS N.-Lübbecke
- 2003–2004: Ystads IF
National team
Years	Team	Apps	(Gls)
1988-1998	Sweden	194	(333)

Teams managed
- 1998–2001: TSV St. Otmar St. Gallen
- 2002–2003: TuS N.-Lübbecke
- 2004–2007: Ystads IF
- 2007–2009: MT Melsungen
- 2008–2014: Norway
- 2011–2012: Aalborg Håndbold
- 2015–2017: Bregenz Handball
- 2018–2025: USA
- 2019–2020: St. Hallvard
- 2020–2023: Nøtterøy Håndball
- 2023–: Fjellhammer IL
- 2025–: Bahrain
Medal record
Olympic Games
Silver medal – second place	1992 Barcelona	Team
Silver medal – second place	1996 Atlanta	Team
World Championships
Bronze medal – third place	1993 Sweden	Team
European Championships
Gold medal – first place	1994 Portugal	Team

Gunnar Robert Hedin (born 2 February 1966) is a Swedish handball coach and retired player who won silver medals at the 1992 and 1996 Summer Olympics. He also won a bronze medal at the 1993 World Championship, playing alongside his younger brother Tony and gold medals at the 1994 European Championship.

Today he is the head coach of the United States men's national handball team and the Norwegian club Fjellhammer IL.

From 2008 to 2014 he was the coach of the Norwegian national handball team.

== Career ==
Hedin played for IFK Ystad HK in Sweden, Stavanger in Norway, Benidorm in Spain, GWD Minden, TuS Nettelstedt-Lübbecke and SV Post Schwerin in Germany and TSV St. Otmar St. Gallen in Switzerland.

From January 2007 to the summer of 2009 he was the coach of the German Handball-Bundesliga team MT Melsungen.

In October 2008 he took over as the Norwegian national team head coach. Here he was until 2014. He was in this position until 2014, where he was replaced by Christian Berge.

In October 2011 he took over the Danish team Aalborg Håndbold, where he coached the rest of the season.

In the summer of 2014 after stopping as the Norwegian head coach, he became a consultant at the Austrian club Bregenz Handball, and in February 2025 he became the head coach of the team. He was named coach of the year in the Austrian top division in 2014-15. He left Bregenz in 2017.

In July 2018 he took over as the USA national team head coach. From the 2019-2020 in addition to being the US head coach, he also became the head coach of Norwegian team St. Hallvard for a single season. In 2020 he took over the Nøtterøy Håndball, which he guided to promotion to the top Norwegian division in 2021. In January 2023 he moved to league rivals Fjellhammer IL.

== Private life ==
He is educated as an engineer.

His brother Tony Hedin is also a handball player. He has 6 kids of which one of them, Amadeus Hedin, is also a handball player, and so is his nephew Viktor Hedin.
