= Lukas Nilsson =

Swedish handball player (born 1996)

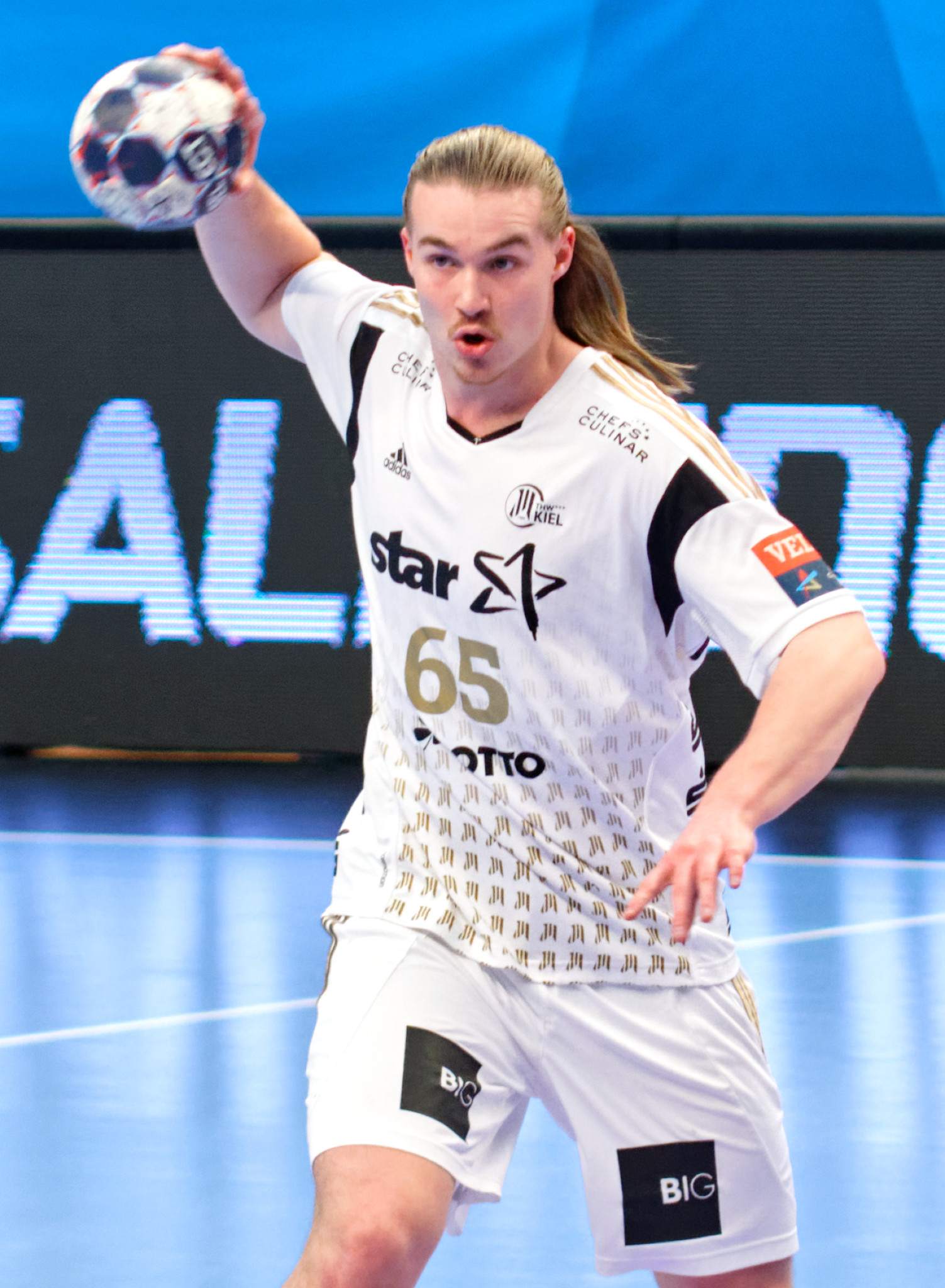
- Nilsson with THW Kiel in 2017

Personal information
- Full name: Lukas Eric Oliver Nilsson
- Nationality: Swedish
- Born: 16 November 1996 (age 29) Ystad, Sweden
- Height: 1.94 m (6 ft 4 in)

Sport
- Sport: Handball
- Position: Left back
- Current club: Aalborg Håndbold
- Number: 3

Youth career
- Years: Team
- –2013: Ystads IF

Senior clubs
- Years: Team
- 2013–2016: Ystads IF
- 2016–2020: THW Kiel
- 2020–2023: Rhein-Neckar Löwen
- 2023–: Aalborg Håndbold
National team
Years	Team	Apps	(Gls)
2015–2020	Sweden	71	(215)
Medal record
European Championship
Silver medal – second place	2018 Croatia

Lukas Eric Oliver Nilsson (born 16 November 1996) is a Swedish handball player for Aalborg Håndbold.

== Club career ==
Nilsson started his career at Ystads IF.

=== THW Kiel ===
On 20 January 2016 THW Kiel announced that Lukas Nilsson would be joining the club on a three-year deal starting on 1 July 2016. On 16 March 2018, his contract was extended until 2021. Here he won the DHB-Pokal in 2017 and 2019, the EHF Cup in 2019 and the German Championship in 2020.

=== Rhein-Neckar Löwen ===
In 2020 he joined league rivals Rhein-Neckar Löwen.

=== Aalborg Håndbold ===
After his contract with 'die löwen' ran out in 2023, he joined Danish side Aalborg Håndbold. In March 2024 he extended his contract with Aalborg until 2027. The same season he won the Danish Championship with the club. In 2025 he won the Danish Cup. Later the same season he won the Danish championship.

== National team ==
Nilsson played 33 for the Swedish youth teams.

He competed at the 2016 European Championship, where Sweden finished 8th. Later the same year he represented Sweden at the 2016 Olympics. The year after he played at the 2017 World Championship.

In 2018 he won silver medals at the 2018 European Championship, losing to Spain in the final.
