= Tony Hedin =

Swedish handball player and coach (born 1969)

Personal information
- Born: 11 April 1969 (age 57) Ystad, Sweden
- Height: 190 cm (75 in)

Sport
- Sport: Handball
- Position: Left back

Senior clubs
- Years: Team
- 1987: Köpingebro IF
- 1987 - 1987: Ystads IF
- 1993 - 1995: TV Hüttenberg
- 1995 - 1998: IFK Ystad HK
- 1998 - 1999: TSG Altenhagen-Heepen
- 1999 - 2001: HSG Varel-Friesland
- 2001 - 2002: IFK Ystad HK
- 2002 - 2004: Ystads IF
- 2004 - 2007: HK Björnen
National team
Years	Team	Apps	(Gls)
–	Sweden	12	(18)
Medal record
Representing Sweden
World Championships
Bronze medal – third place	1993 Sweden	Team

Tony Hedin (born 11 April 1969) is a Swedish handball coach and retired player. He won a bronze medal at the 1993 World Championships, playing alongside his elder brother Robert.

In the 1991-92 season he won the Swedish Championship with Ystads IF, and in the following season he was the top scorer in the Swedish league with 218 goals.
