= Martin Bager =

Danish handballer (born 1982)

Personal information
- Full name: Martin Bager
- Nationality: Danish (Denmark)
- Born: 14 January 1982 (age 44)
- Height: 193 cm (76 in)

Sport
- Sport: Handball
- Position: Line player
- Current club: Retired
- Number: 9

Senior clubs
- Years: Team
- 2002-2006: Team Helsinge
- 2006-2008: Nordsjælland Håndbold
- 2008-2009: BM Ciudad Encantada
- 2009-2010: AG Håndbold
- 2010-2011: AG København
- 2011-2016: Ystads IF
National team
Years	Team	Apps	(Gls)
2004-2009	Denmark	12	(14)

Martin Bager (born 14 January 1982) is a Danish former handballer and current handball coach, who played for Liga ASOBAL side BM Ciudad Encantada, Swedish team Ystads IF and Danish sides Team Helsinge, Nordsjælland Håndbold, AG København and AG Håndbold.

During his youth career, Bager made several appearances for the Danish national youth handball teams.

After his playing career he has managed the Danish 4th tier side Virum-Sorgenfri HK as well as some of the youth teams.
