= Kaupo Palmar =

Estonian handball player

Kaupo Palmar (born 24 October 1975 in Rakvere) is an Estonian former handball player.

1995–2010 he has played in the following clubs: HC Kehra, IFK Ystad (Sweden), SG Flensburg-Handewitt (Germany), Skjern Håndbold (Denmark), Ystads IF (Sweden), AG København (Denmark).

In 2003 and 2005 he was named "Estonian Best Handball Player of the Year".

He has played in Estonia men's national handball team.

His son Kasper Palmar is also a handball player.
