= Dalibor Doder =

Swedish handball player (born 1979)

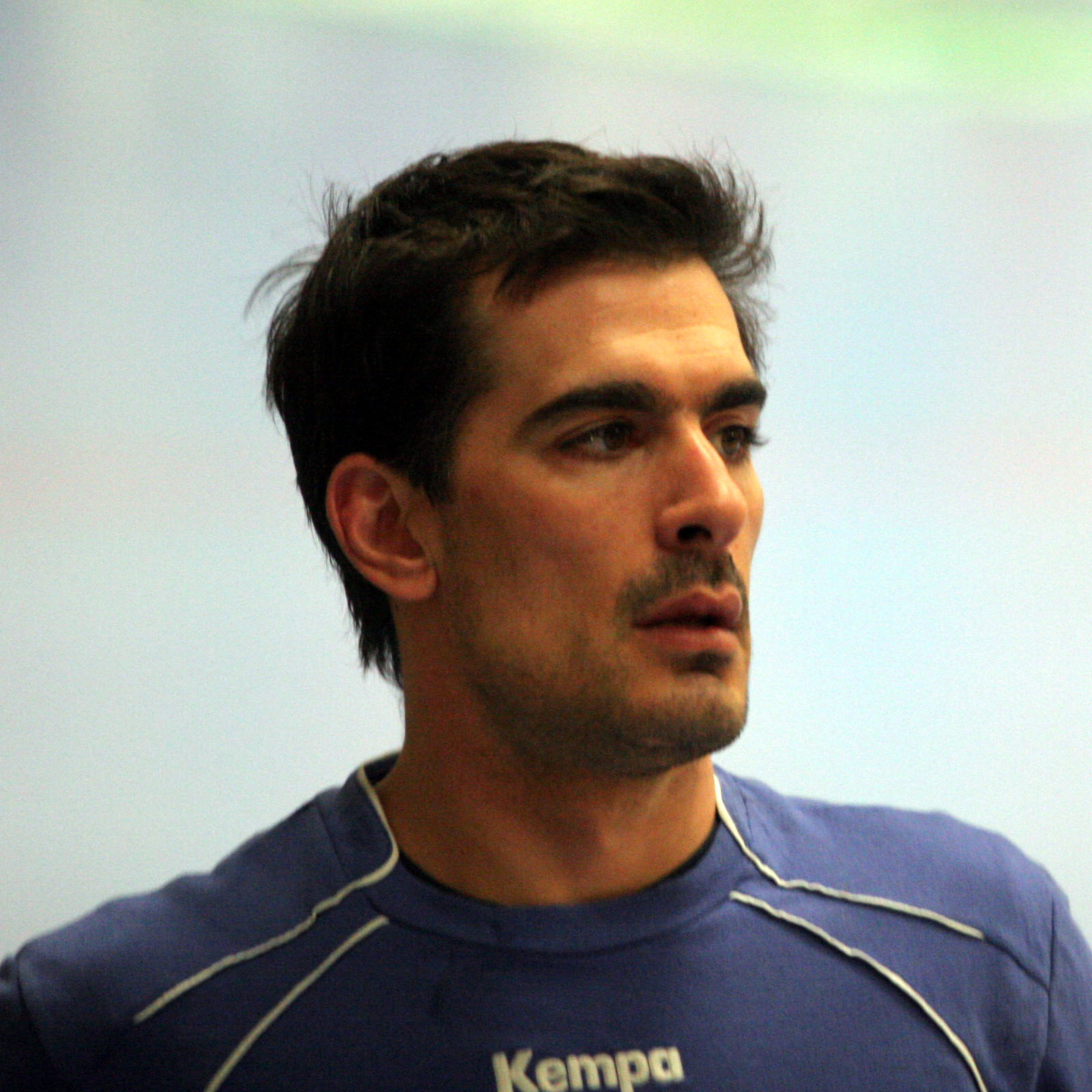

Personal information
- Full name: Dalibor Doder
- Nationality: Swedish
- Born: 24 May 1979 (age 47) Malmö, Sweden
- Height: 1.83 m (6 ft 0 in)

Sport
- Sport: Handball
- Position: Centre back
- Current club: Vinslövs HK

Youth career
- Years: Team
- –1995: Malmö HP

Senior clubs
- Years: Team
- 1995–2003: Lugi HF
- 2003–2005: IFK Ystad
- 2005: SD Teucro
- 2005–2009: BM Aragón
- 2009–2010: CB Ademar León
- 2010–2019: GWD Minden
- 2019–2022: Ystads IF
- 2022: IFK Ystad
- 2022–: Vinslövs HK
National team
Years	Team	Apps	(Gls)
1998–2012	Sweden	146	(430)
Medal record
Men's handball
Representing Sweden
Olympic Games
Silver medal – second place	2012 London	Team

Dalibor Doder (Serbian Cyrillic: Далибор Додер; born 24 May 1979) is a Swedish professional handballer, who currently plays for Vinslövs HK. He competed for the Swedish national team at the 2012 Summer Olympics in London. His parents emigrated from SR Serbia to Sweden, where they met.
