= Niclas Ekberg =

Swedish handball player (born 1988)

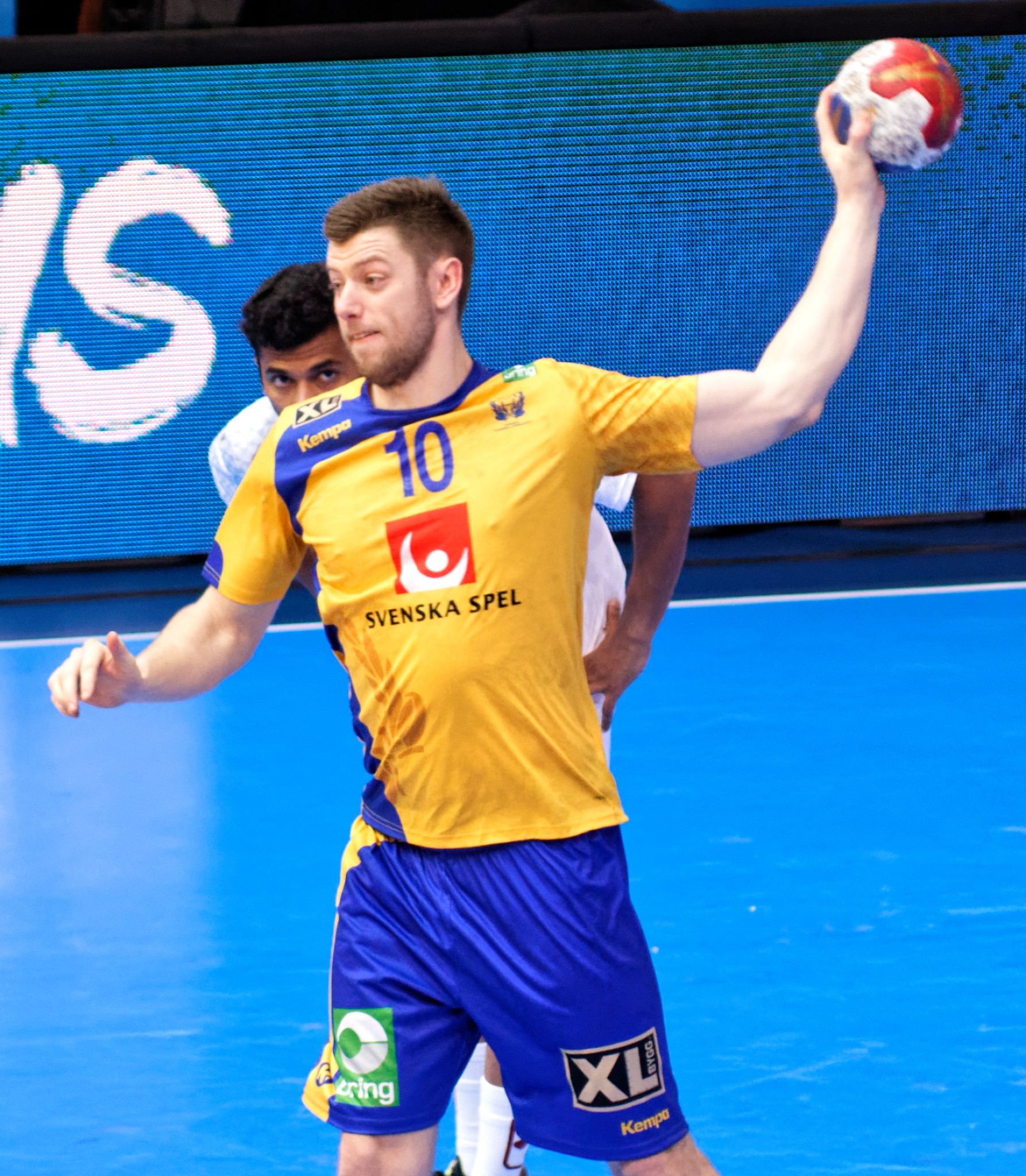
- Ekberg in 2017

Personal information
- Nationality: Swedish
- Born: 23 December 1988 (age 37) Ystad, Sweden
- Height: 1.91 m (6 ft 3 in)

Sport
- Sport: Handball
- Position: Right wing
- Current club: Ystads IF
- Number: 18

Senior clubs
- Years: Team
- –2009: IFK Ystad HK
- 2009–2010: Ystads IF
- 2010–2012: AG København
- 2012–2024: THW Kiel
- 2024–: Ystads IF
National team
Years	Team	Apps	(Gls)
2008–	Sweden	210	(841)
Medal record
Olympic Games
Silver medal – second place	2012 London	Team
European Championship
Gold medal – first place	2022 Hungary/Slovakia
Silver medal – second place	2018 Croatia
- Updated on 1 July 2024

Niclas Ekberg (born 23 December 1988) is a Swedish professional handballer for Ystads IF and Sweden men's national handball team. He is known to be an exceptionally prolific goalscorer and holds many different goalscoring records at his club, THW Kiel.

== Career ==
Ekberg started his career at IFK Ystad. In the 2008–2009 season he scored the second most goals in the Swedish league and was named Årets Komet. He then joined city rivals Ystads IF. With Ystad IF he played in the EHF Challenge Cup in the 2009–10 season.

In the summer of 2010 he joined Danish side AG København Here he won back-to-back Danish league and Danish cup doubles. When the club became insolvent in July 2012 Ekberg was released of his contract.

He then joined THW Kiel in Germany on a contract until 2015, which was extended in 2014 until 2018. With Kiel he won the 2013, 2017 and 2019 DHB-Pokal and the 2013, 2014, 2015, 2020 and 2021 German Championships. He also won the 2019-20 EHF Champions League. He scored 15 goals at the final four event, and with 85 goals overall he became the Champions League top scorer.

In the 2019–20 season Ekberg reached 1000 Bundesliga goals, and replaced Nikolaj Jacobsen as the record holder for most club penalty goals, when he scored no. 390. In the 2020–21 season he became the fourth most scoring player for THW Kiel, when he overtook Uwe Schwenker at 1224 goals. On the 33rd round he reached the milestone of scoring 2000 goals in all competitions for the club. In the 4th round of the 2021–22 season he overtook the club all-time league top scorer second place, beating his own coach Filip Jicha (1319 goals). The very next game he scored eleven goals against GWD Minden to overtake Magnus Wislanders record of 1332 league goals and became the club's all-time league top scorer. In November 2024 in a Champions League match against Aalborg Håndbold he became the top scorer for the club in all competitions with 2125 goals, 1776 of which were league goals.

In 2023 after twelve years in Kiel, Ekdahl returned to Sweden to join Ystads IF HF on a three-year deal.

=== Bundesligatable ===
Season	Team	League	Games	Goals	Pen.	Non-pen.
2012/13	THW Kiel	Bundesliga	31	94	36	58
2013/14	THW Kiel	Bundesliga	34	98	19	79
2014/15	THW Kiel	Bundesliga	36	103	5	98
2015/16	THW Kiel	Bundesliga	30	140	38	102
2016/17	THW Kiel	Bundesliga	31	137	41	96
2017/18	THW Kiel	Bundesliga	34	171	84	87
2018/19	THW Kiel	Bundesliga	33	187	89	98
2019/20	THW Kiel	Bundesliga	26	164	104	60
2020/21	THW Kiel	Bundesliga	33	205	98	107
2021/22	THW Kiel	Bundesliga	34	189	99	90
2022/23	THW Kiel	Bundesliga	32	137	73	64
2023/24	THW Kiel	Bundesliga	34	151	62	89
2012–2024	Total	Bundesliga	388	1776	748	1028

Source: Player profile At the Handball-Bundesliga

=== National team ===
Ekdahl played 18 matches for the Swedish U-19 team and 29 matches for the Swedish U-21 team.

His first senior international match was on November 2, 2008, against Turkey.

He was part of the Swedish team that won silver at the 2012 Summer Olympics. With 50 goals he was the topscorer at the tournament.

From 2017 to 2019 he was the captain of the Swedish national team. He retired from this responsibility, when he took a small break from the national team due to familial reasons.

He represented Sweden at the 2020 Olympics in Tokyo.

He was also part of the Swedish national team that won the 2022 European Championship. He missed much of the tournament due to a positive COVID-19 test, and could only return to the team in the final. In the final against Spain at the score 26:26, Sweden got a penalty after regulation, which could determine the match if it was scored. Ekberg stepped up to meet Pérez de Vargas in the goal, and Ekberg scored, taking the gold medals with them to Sweden.

At the 2023 World Championship he finished 4th with the Swedish team. He was selected for the All-star team for the tournament.

In October 2023 he announced his retirement from the National team. He did however unretire for the 2025 World Championship. Here Sweden did however have a disappointing tournament, where they finished fourteenth, losing to Brazil and Norway and drawing Portugal in the process.

== Titles ==
- German Bundesliga: 2013, 2014, 2015, 2020, 2021 and 2023
- DHB-Supercup: 2014, 2015, 2020, 2021, 2022 and 2023
- DHB-Pokal: 2013, 2017, 2019 and 2022
- Danish League: 2011 and 2012
- Danish Cup: 2011 and 2012
- EHF Cup: 2019
- EHF Champions League: 2020
- European Champion 2012
- Olympics Silver medals 2012

== Individual awards ==
- All-Star Right wing of the World Championship: 2023
- 2012 Olympics topscorer
- 2019-20 EHF Champions League Topscorer
- Swedish Handballer of the year 2014/15
- Årets Komet in Swedish handball
