= Fredrik Petersen =

Swedish handball player (born 1983)

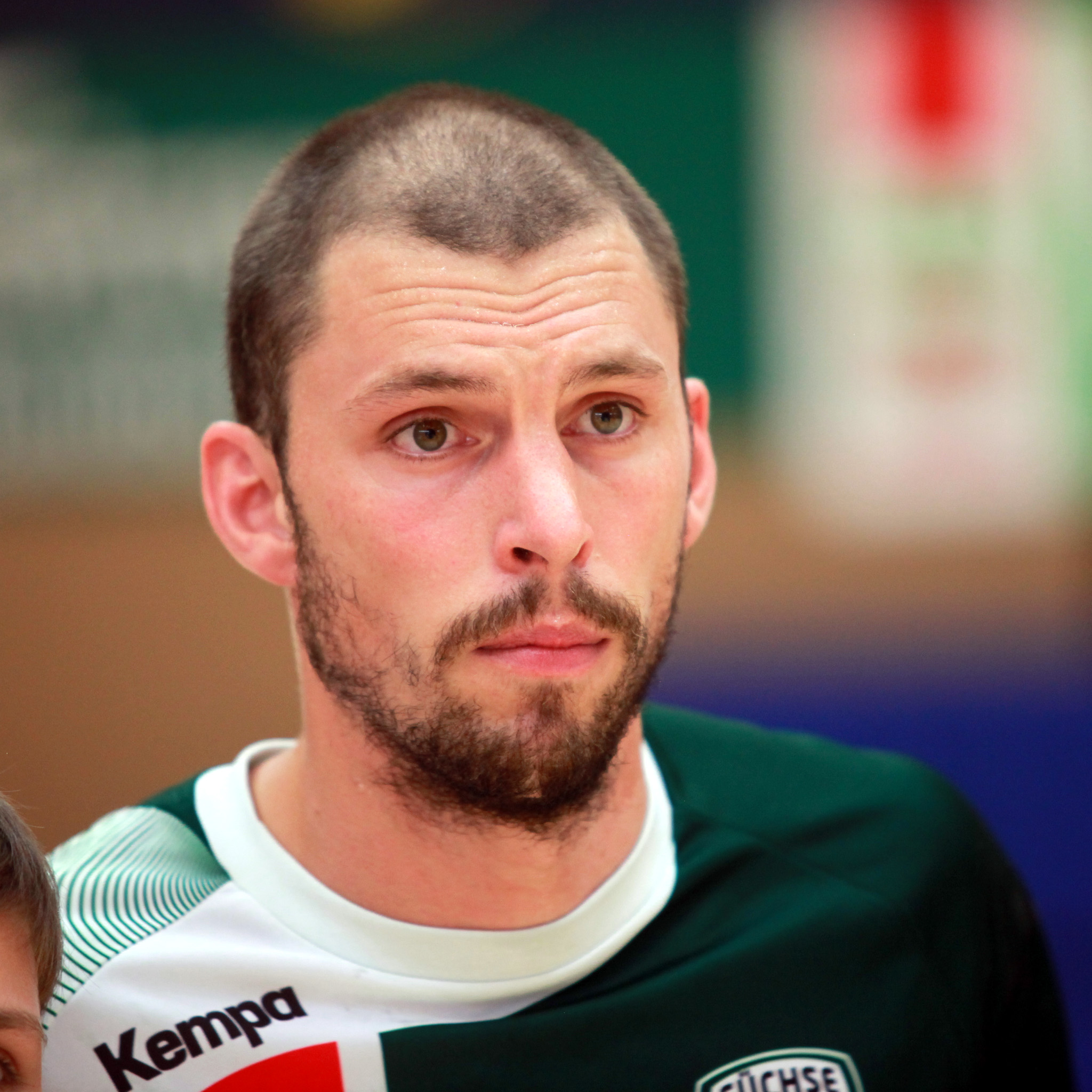

Personal information
- Full name: Fredrik Raahauge Petersen
- Nationality: Swedish
- Born: 27 August 1983 (age 43) Ystad, Sweden
- Height: 1.88 m (6 ft 2 in)

Sport
- Sport: Handball
- Position: Left wing / Centre back

Senior clubs
- Years: Team
- –2006: IFK Ystad
- 2006–2010: GOG Svendborg TGI
- 2010–2012: Bjerringbro-Silkeborg
- 2012–2013: HSV Hamburg
- 2013–2015: Füchse Berlin
- 2015–2018: HK Malmö
- 2018–2020: IFK Ystad
- 2020–2021: IFK Kristianstad
- 2021–2023: IFK Ystad
National team
Years	Team	Apps	(Gls)
2003–2016	Sweden	155	(426)

Teams managed
- 2023–: IFK Ystad
Medal record
Olympic Games
Silver medal – second place	2012 London	Team

Fredrik Raahauge Petersen (born 27 August 1983) is a Swedish handball coach and previous player. He was part of the Swedish team that won the silver medal at the 2012 Summer Olympics. With HSV Hamburg he won the EHF Champions League 2013.

In 2021 he announced he would end his career as a player, and instead work as a Sporting director for IFK Ystad. However, he made a comeback as player in IFK Ystad in December 2021. Since 2023 he is the head coach of IFK Ystad.
