= Heðin =

Heðin is a Faroese given name that may refer to

- Heðin Brú (1901–1987), pen name of Faroese novelist and translator Hans Jacob Jacobsen
- Heðin M. Klein (born 1950), Faroese teacher, writer and former politician
- Heðin á Lakjuni (born 1978), Faroese football player
- Heðin Mortensen (born 1946), Faroese politician

== See also ==
- Hedin (surname)
