= Mattias Andersson (handballer) =

Swedish handball player and coach (born 1978)

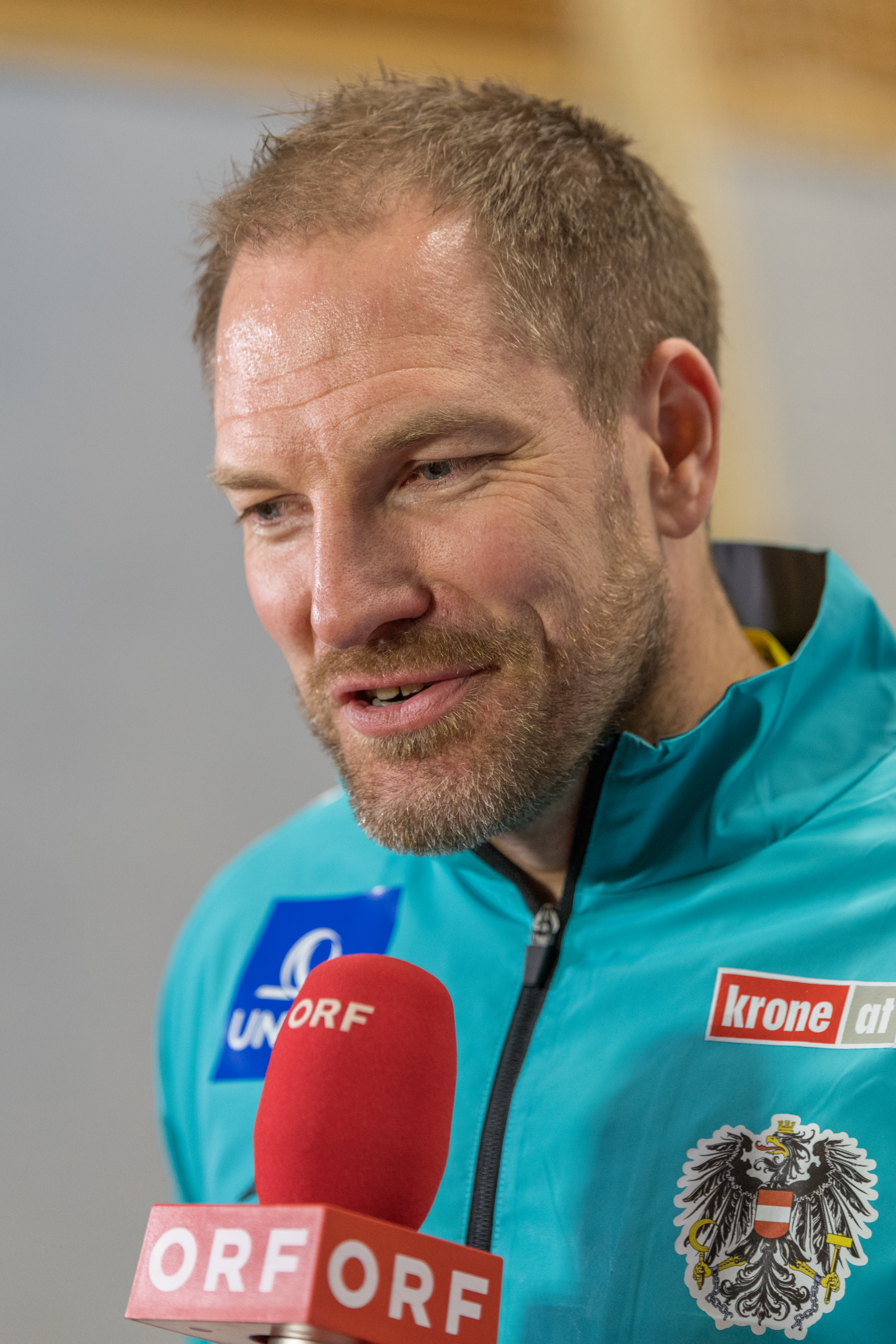
- Andersson in 2018

Personal information
- Full name: Erik Mattias Andersson
- Nationality: Swedish
- Born: 29 March 1978 (age 48) Husie, Sweden
- Height: 1.86 m (6 ft 1 in)

Sport
- Sport: Handball
- Position: Goalkeeper
- Current club: Germany (GK coach); THW Kiel (GK coach); Ystads IF (GK coach)

Senior clubs
- Years: Team
- 1985–1990: Ystads IF
- 1999–2001: HK Drott
- 2001: FC Barcelona
- 2001–2008: THW Kiel
- 2008–2011: TV Großwallstadt
- 2011–2018: SG Flensburg-Handewitt
- 2020–2021: THW Kiel
National team
Years	Team	Apps	(Gls)
1998–2016	Sweden	141	(0)

Teams managed
- 2018–2020: Austria (GK coach)
- 2018–: THW Kiel (GK coach)
- 2018–: Ystads IF (GK coach)
- 2020–: Germany (GK coach)
Medal record
Olympic Games
Silver medal – second place	2012 London	Team
European Championships
Gold medal – first place	2000 Croatia

Erik Mattias Andersson (born 29 March 1978) is a retired Swedish handballer and currently a goalkeeper coach. He competed for the Swedish national team at the 2012 Summer Olympics in London where they won the silver medal.

He was named Swedish Handballer of the Year in 2014.

== Honours ==
- Bundesliga:
  - Gold: 2002, 2005, 2006, 2007, 2008, 2018, 2021
- German Cup:
  - Gold: 2007, 2008, 2015
- German Super Cup:
  - Gold: 2005, 2007, 2013
- EHF Champions League:
  - Gold: 2007, 2014
- EHF Cup Winners' Cup:
  - Gold: 2012
- EHF Cup:
  - Gold: 2002, 2004
- EHF Champions Trophy:
  - Gold: 2007
