= Kim Andersson =

Swedish handball player (born 1982)

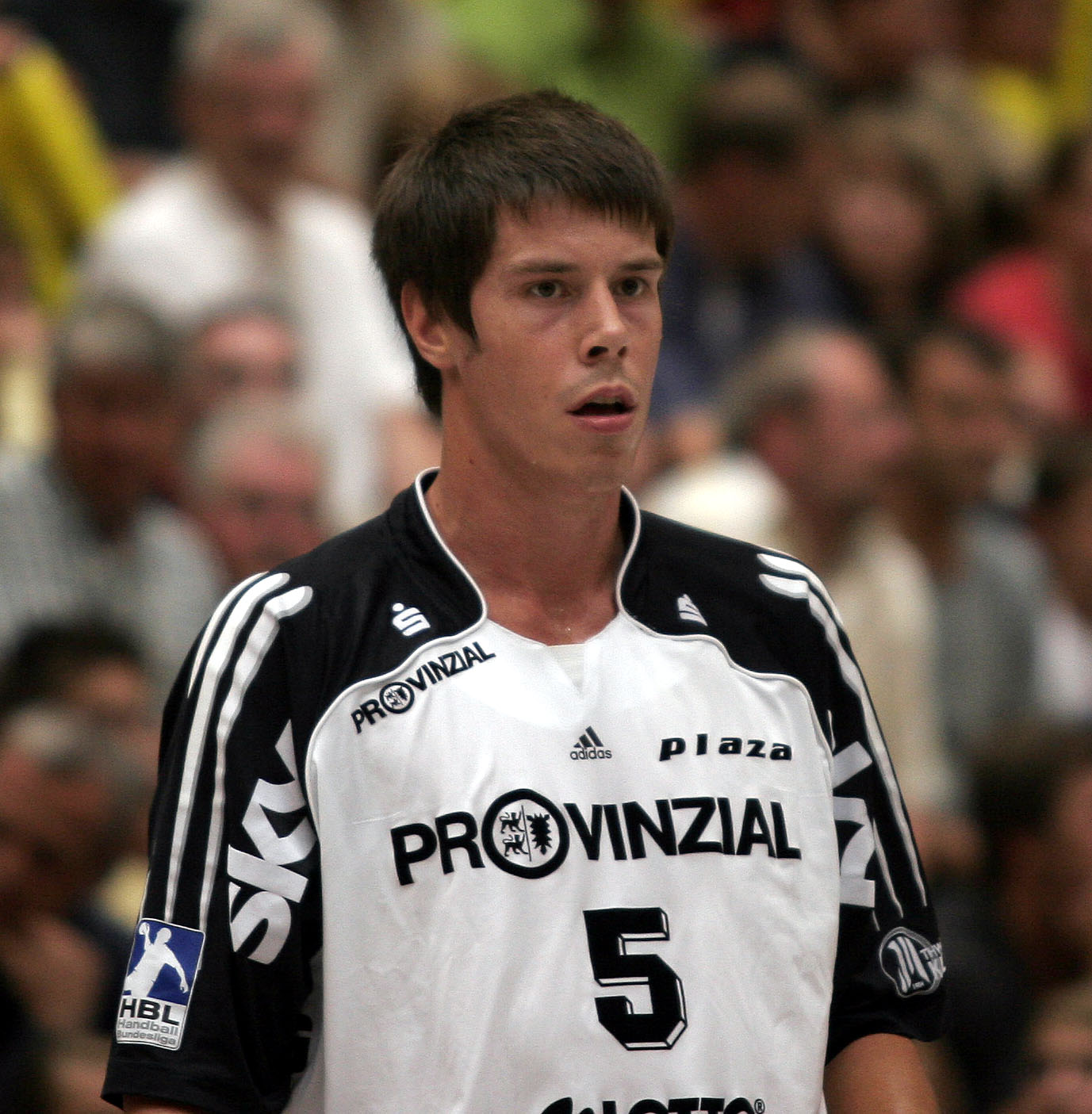
- Kim Andersson

Personal information
- Nationality: Swedish
- Born: 21 August 1982 (age 44) Kävlinge, Sweden
- Height: 2.00 m (6 ft 7 in)

Sport
- Sport: Handball
- Position: Right back
- Number: 5

Senior clubs
- Years: Team
- 1998–2001: Ystads IF
- 2001–2005: IK Sävehof
- 2005–2012: THW Kiel
- 2012–2015: KIF Kolding København
- 2015–2025: Ystads IF
National team
Years	Team	Apps	(Gls)
2001–2019	Sweden	240	(824)
Medal record
Olympic Games
Silver medal – second place	2012 London	Team

Kim Andersson (born 21 August 1982) is a Swedish former handball player who last played for Ystads IF. He was named Swedish Player of the Year three times; in 2007, 2008 and 2012.

He was voted into the All-Star Team as Best right back at the 2008 European Men's Handball Championship, where Sweden finished 5th. He was part of the Swedish team that won the silver medal at the 2012 Summer Olympics.

== Club play ==
Andersson participated on the THW Kiel team that won the EHF Champions League in 2007. He is Swedish champion from 2004 and 2005 with IK Sävehof, and German champion from 2006 and 2007 with THW Kiel. He once again became Swedish champion 2022 with Ystads IF.
