= IFK Ystad HK =

Swedish handball club

- Full name: IFK Ystad Handbollsklubb
- Short name: IFK
- Founded: 1927; 99 years ago
- Arena: Ystad Arena, Ystad
- Capacity: 2,700
- President: Joakim Öhrström
- Head coach: Fredrik Petersen
- League: Allsvenskan
- Club colours
Home	Away

IFK Ystad HK is a Swedish handball club based in Ystad, founded in 1927.

== History ==
The club won promotion to the top division, at the time known as Allsvenskan, in 1941, but were relegated after one season. They did not return until 1997, when the league had been renamed Elitserien. In 1998–99, IFK Ystad finished 7th in the autumn season and qualified for the spring season of Elitserien. They finished last (8th) in the spring league, but still qualified for the premilinary round of the playoffs. They eliminated Lugi HF in the preliminary round, but were defeated by HK Drott in the quarterfinals. In 1999–2000, the club finished 7th in the spring Elitserien and lost against Alingsås HK in the playoffs preliminary round. In the following season they improved to 4th and qualified directly for the quarterfinals, where they were eliminated by IFK Skövde. In 2001–02, IFK Ystad finished second in the spring league, but were defeated by Lugi HF in the quarterfinals. They finished fourth in the spring league in 2002–03, and were again eliminated in the quarterfinals, by IFK Skövde. For 2003–04 the autumn and spring leagues were discontinued and a single league was played each season. IFK Ystad finished 5th in Elitserien that season, and won against HK Drott in the quarterfinals, but were eliminated by IK Sävehof in the semi-finals. In the following season the team finished 3rd in the league, but lost in the quarterfinals against HK Drott. IFK Ystad finished 5th in the league in 2005–06, and lost in the quarterfinals against Hammarby IF.

In 2006–07 the club's fortunes turned for the worse, as they finished 13th and were relegated. They returned to the top division in 2008–09 and 2016–17, but were immediately relegated both times. In the 2017–18 season IFK Ystad play in Allsvenskan, the second level. For the 2018–19 season they were back in the top division. In 2021–22 they finished last, and were relegated to Allsvenskan again.

IFK Ystad have a long-standing rivalry with cross-town rivals Ystads IF.

=== Kits ===
HOME
2012-13	2013-14	Select; 2018-19

AWAY
2012-13	Select; 2018-19

== Venue ==
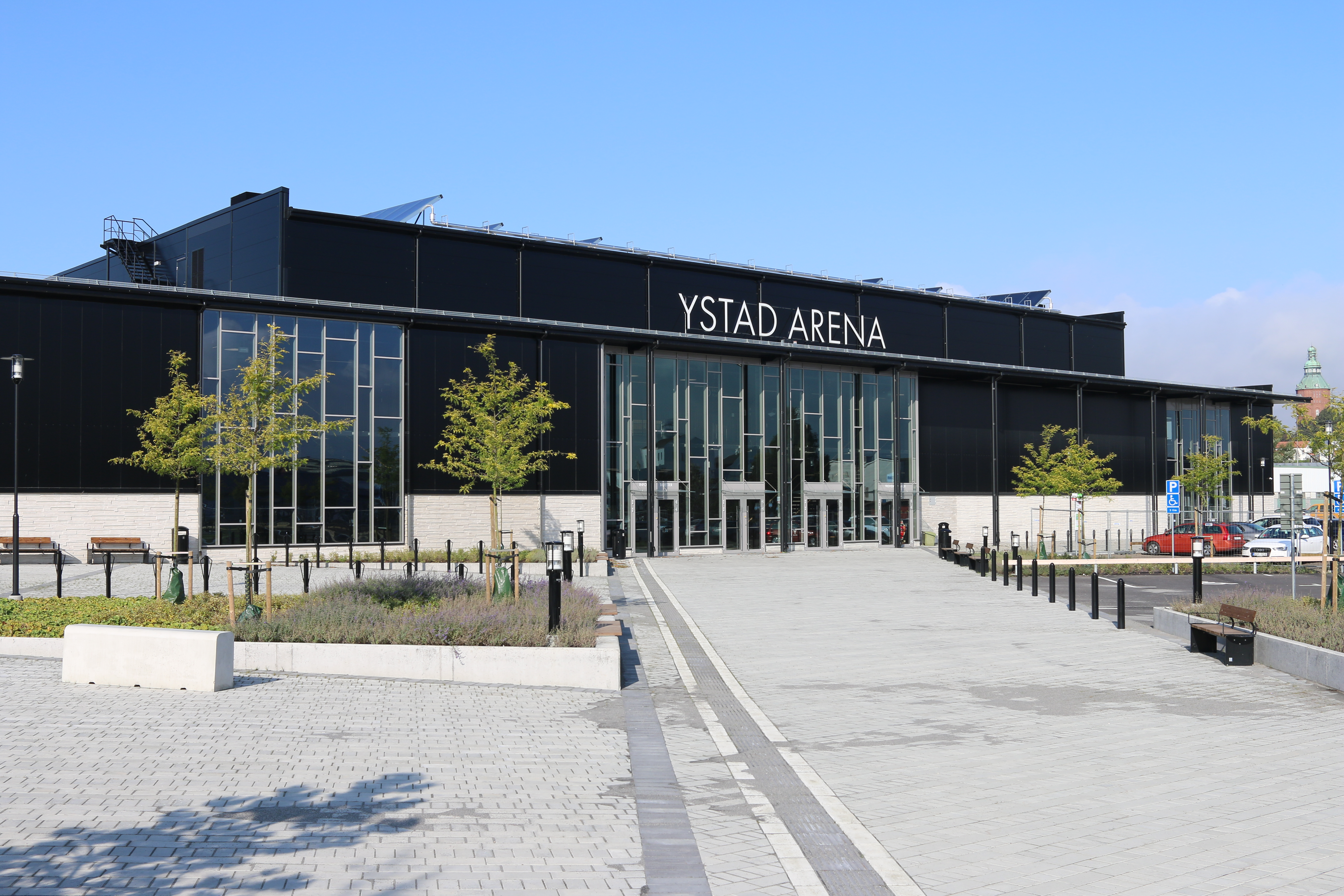
Ystad Arena

IFK Ystad plays in Ystad Arena since 2016 after having moved from Österportshallen.

== Team ==
=== Current squad ===
Squad for the 2026–27 season

Goalkeepers
Left Wingers

- (Sweden) Nils Persson

Right Wingers
Line players

Left Backs
Central Backs
Right Backs

=== Transfers ===
Transfers for the 2026–27 season

Joining

- (Sweden) Nils Persson (LW) from (Sweden) Ystads IF

Leaving

=== Transfer History ===
Transfers for the 2025–26 season

Joining

Leaving

- (Sweden) Jonathan Andersson (RB) to (Sweden) HF Karlskrona

== Former club members ==
=== Notable former players ===
- (Sweden) Marcus Ahlm
- (Sweden) Dan Beutler
- (Sweden) Dalibor Doder
- (Sweden) Niclas Ekberg
- (Sweden) Jim Gottfridsson
- (Estonia) Kaupo Palmar
- (Sweden) Fredrik Petersen
