= 2021–22 Handbollsligan =

Swedish handball league season

Handbollsligan
- Season: 2021–22
- Dates: 10 September 2021 – 27 May 2022
- Champion: Ystads IF; 3rd title
- Relegated: IFK Ystad
- European League: Ystads IF; IK Sävehof; IFK Kristianstad
- European Cup: Alingsås HK
- Top goalscorer: Elliot Stenmalm (172 goals)

The 2021–22 Handbollsligan was the 88th season of the Swedish Handball League, the top men's handball league in Sweden. A total of fourteen teams contested this season's league, which began on 10 September 2021 and concluded on 27 May 2022.

Ystads IF won their third title.

== Teams ==
Location of teams in 2021–22 Handbollsligan

=== Arenas and locations ===
The following 14 clubs competed in the Handbollsligan during the 2021–22 season:

Team	Location	Arena	Capacity
Alingsås HK	Alingsås	Estrad Alingsås	2,800
Eskilstuna Guif	Eskilstuna	STIGA Sports Arena	3,700
Hammarby IF	Stockholm	Eriksdalshallen	2,600
HK Aranäs	Kungsbacka	Kungsbacka sporthall	1,000
HK Malmö	Malmö	Baltiska Hallen	4,000
IF Hallby	Jönköping	Jönköpings idrottshus	1,500
IFK Kristianstad	Kristianstad	Kristianstad Arena	5,221
IFK Skövde	Skövde	Arena Skövde	2,516
IFK Ystad	Ystad	Ystad Arena	2,863
IK Sävehof	Partille	Partille Arena	4,100
Lugi HF	Lund	Sparbanken Skåne Arena	3,500
Redbergslids IK	Gothenburg	Prioritet Serneke Arena	550
Ystads IF	Ystad	Ystad Arena	2,863
Önnereds HK	Gothenburg	ÖHK-hallen	1,004

== Regular season ==
=== League table ===
Pos	Team	Pld	W	D	L	GF	GA	GD	Pts	Qualification or relegation
1	IK Sävehof	26	21	1	4	794	685	+109	43	Qualification to Playoffs
2	IFK Skövde	26	18	2	6	766	706	+60	38	Qualification to Playoffs
3	IFK Kristianstad	26	17	3	6	730	665	+65	37	Qualification to Playoffs
4	Ystads IF	26	16	2	8	775	714	+61	34	Qualification to Playoffs
5	HK Malmö	26	14	2	10	743	704	+39	30	Qualification to Playoffs
6	Alingsås HK	26	11	5	10	722	712	+10	27	Qualification to Playoffs
7	Hammarby IF	26	12	2	12	735	734	+1	26	Qualification to Playoffs
8	Lugi HF	26	10	4	12	701	698	+3	24	Qualification to Playoffs
9	Eskilstuna Guif	26	11	0	15	720	774	−54	22	
10	IF Hallby	26	8	5	13	680	725	−45	21	
11	Önnereds HK (O)	26	8	3	15	737	772	−35	19	Qualification for Relegation play-offs
12	Redbergslids IK (O)	26	7	3	16	719	776	−57	17	Qualification for Relegation play-offs
13	HK Aranäs (O)	26	6	3	17	665	743	−78	15	Qualification for Relegation play-offs
14	IFK Ystad (R)	26	3	5	18	675	754	−79	11	Relegated to Allsvenskan

Source: Flashscore
Rules for classification: 1) points; 2) head-to-head points; 3) goal difference; 4) goals scored; 5) head-to-head goal difference; 6) head-to-head number of goals scored.
(O) Play-off winners; (R) Relegated

== Playoffs ==
All three rounds of the playoffs were played in a best-of-five format, with the higher seeded team playing the first, third and fifth (if it was necessary) game at home.

Quarterfinals
2	IFK Skövde	3
7	Hammarby IF	0
3	IFK Kristianstad	3
6	Alingsås HK	1
1	IK Sävehof	3
8	Lugi HF	2
4	Ystads IF	3
5	HK Malmö	1

Semifinals
2	IFK Skövde	3
3	IFK Kristianstad	1
1	IK Sävehof	1
4	Ystads IF	3

Finals
2	IFK Skövde	1
4	Ystads IF	3

=== Quarterfinals ===
Team 1	Series	Team 2	Game 1	Game 2	Game 3	Game 4	Game 5
IK Sävehof	3–2	Lugi HF	24–25	28–24	33–25	26–30	33–21
IFK Skövde	3–0	Hammarby IF	30–28	30–24	37–23	–	–
IFK Kristianstad	3–1	Alingsås HK	30–21	29–34	28–24	29–24	–
Ystads IF	3–1	HK Malmö	32–29	30–39	33–30	28–26	–

=== Semifinals ===
Team 1	Series	Team 2	Game 1	Game 2	Game 3	Game 4	Game 5
IK Sävehof	1–3	Ystads IF	26–32	29–28	34–25	29–26	–
IFK Skövde	3–1	IFK Kristianstad	41–40 (p)	33–28	24–28	36–31	–

=== Finals ===
Team 1	Series	Team 2	Game 1	Game 2	Game 3	Game 4	Game 5
IFK Skövde	1–3	Ystads IF	28–30	34–29 (aet)	27–31	46–47 (p)	–

==== Game 1 ====
19 May 2022; 19:10	IFK Skövde	28–30	Ystads IF	Arena Skövde, Skövde; Attendance: 2,432; Referees: Kurtagic, Wetterwik
19 May 2022; 19:10	Thurin 7	(13–16)	Karlsson 7	Arena Skövde, Skövde; Attendance: 2,432; Referees: Kurtagic, Wetterwik
19 May 2022; 19:10	1× (yellow card) 5× (suspension)	Report	1× (yellow card) 6× (suspension)	Arena Skövde, Skövde; Attendance: 2,432; Referees: Kurtagic, Wetterwik

==== Game 2 ====
21 May 2022
18:10
Ystads IF
29–34 (ET)
IFK Skövde
Ystad Arena, Ystad
Attendance: 2,609
Referees: M. Gomér, J. Gomér
Andersson 8
(14–14)
Valdimarsson 7
1× (yellow card) 6× (suspension) 1× (red card)
Report
2× (yellow card) 7× (suspension)

FT: 29–29 ET: 0–5

==== Game 3 ====
24 May 2022; 19:10	IFK Skövde	27–31	Ystads IF	Arena Skövde, Skövde; Attendance: 2,516; Referees: Canbro, Kliko
24 May 2022; 19:10	Helt, Thurin 5	(16–14)	Lindskog 5	Arena Skövde, Skövde; Attendance: 2,516; Referees: Canbro, Kliko
24 May 2022; 19:10	1× (yellow card) 6× (suspension)	Report	2× (yellow card) 6× (suspension)	Arena Skövde, Skövde; Attendance: 2,516; Referees: Canbro, Kliko

==== Game 4 ====
27 May 2022
19:10
Ystads IF
47–46 (ET)
IFK Skövde
Ystad Arena, Ystad
Attendance: 2,700
Referees: Kurtagic, Wetterwik
Karlsson, Lindskog 10
(15–14)
Hallén 14
1× (yellow card) 3× (suspension)
Report
1× (yellow card) 5× (suspension) 1× (red card)

FT: 32–32 ET: 4–4, 6–6 Pen: 5–4

Ystads IF won the Finals, 3–1 on series.

== Promotion/relegation play-offs ==
Two legged relegation play-off matches will be played between the teams placed 11th, 12th and 13th at the end of the regular season and the teams placed 2nd, 3rd and 4th at the end of Allsvenskan season. The legs were played in a best-of-five format.

Team 1	Series	Team 2	Game 1	Game 2	Game 3	Game 4	Game 5
Önnereds HK (I)	3–2	(II) Skånela IF	26–32	33–28	34–35 (aet)	27–20	36–29
Redbergslids IK (I)	3–0	(II) Kungälvs HK	27–18	30–26	32–22	–	–
HK Aranäs (I)	3–0	(II) Amo HK	28–26	33–31	38–36	–	–

== Statistics ==
=== Top goalscorers ===
Rank	Player	Club	Goals
1	(Sweden) Elliot Stenmalm	Redbergslids IK	172
2	(Denmark) Mathias Pedersen	Alingsås HK	152
3	(Sweden) Martin Dolk	Hammarby IF	148
4	(Sweden) Hampus Dahlgren	IF Hallby	145
5	(Sweden) Markus Olsson	IFK Kristianstad	144
6	(Sweden) Fredrik Olsson	Lugi HF	142
7	(Sweden) Markus Thorbjörn	Önnereds HK	137
8	(Sweden) Fredrik Gustavsson	Eskilstuna Guif	131
9	(Sweden) Gustav Davidsson	Hammarby IF	126
10	(Sweden) Daniel Blomgren	Alingsås HK	123

=== Awards ===
The awards were announced on 21 May 2022.

Position	Player	Club
Most valuable player	(Faroe Islands) Elias Ellefsen á Skipagøtu	IK Sävehof
Best defense	(Sweden) Philip Stenmalm	Ystads IF
Best coach	(Sweden) Oscar Carlén	Ystads IF

=== All-Star team ===
The all-star team was announced on 21 May 2022.

Position	Player	Club
Goalkeeper	(Denmark) Bertram Obling	IK Sävehof
Left wing	(Sweden) Martin Dolk	Hammarby IF
Left back	(Sweden) Markus Olsson	IFK Kristianstad
Centre back	(Faroe Islands) Elias Ellefsen á Skipagøtu	IK Sävehof
Pivot	(Denmark) Dan Beck-Hansen	IFK Skövde
Right back	(Sweden) Jack Thurin	IFK Skövde
Right wing	(Sweden) Sebastian Karlsson	IK Sävehof

== See also ==
- 2021–22 Allsvenskan
