= Martin Dolk =

Swedish handball player (born 1990)

Personal information
- Nationality: Swedish
- Born: 25 March 1990 (age 36) Stockholm, Sweden
- Height: 1.84 m (6 ft 0 in)

Sport
- Sport: Handball
- Position: Left winger, centre back
- Current club: Hammarby IF
- Number: 11

Youth career
- Years: Team
- –: Westermalms IF
- –: GT-76
- –: Hammarby IF

Senior clubs
- Years: Team
- 2006–2014: Hammarby IF
- 2014–2015: KIF Kolding
- 2015–: Hammarby IF
National team
| Years | Team | Apps | (Gls) |
| 2013–2014 | Sweden | 10 | (23) |

Martin Per Dolk (born 25 March 1990) is a Swedish handballer who plays for Hammarby IF in the Swedish Handball League. Between 2013 and 2014, he represented the Sweden national team. Mainly a left winger, he can also play as a centre back.

== Career ==
=== Hammarby ===
Dolk made his senior debut for Hammarby in 2007, making his first appearance in the semifinals against Redbergslids IK. The club went on to win the 2006–07 Swedish Handball League, beating Skövde HF in the final. The following season, in 2007–08, Hammarby defended their Swedish champion title, defeating IK Sävehof in the final.

In 2012–13, Dolk was the top scorer in the Swedish Handball League, scoring 214 goals throughout the season, also winning a spot in the league's All-Star Team. After the season, he signed a new one-year contract with the club. In 2013–14, he scored 2014 goals, the second most in the whole league behind Zoran Roganović, and was inducted in the All Star-team for a second consecutive year. Between 2013 and 2014, Dolk also won 10 caps for the Sweden national team, scoring 23 goals.

=== Kolding ===
Ahead of the 2014–15 season, Dolk signed a two-year contract with KIF Kolding in the Danish Handball League. He was part of the squad that was crowned Danish champions at the end of the year.

=== Return to Hammarby ===
After one year abroad, he returned to Hammarby in the fall of 2015. The next years was, however, plagued by injuries that periodically kept him sidelined. Dolk both suffered from a stress fracture and a broken leg.

In 2018–19, Hammarby suffered a relegation to Allsvenskan, the Swedish second tier. Dolk decided to stay with the club and played an essential part when Hammarby won a promotion in the 2020–21 season.

On 3 June 2021, ahead of Hammarby's return to the Swedish Handball League, Dolk signed a new three-year contract with the club. In 2021–22, Dolk won a spot in the All-Star Team for the third time in his career, after finishing as the season's third top scorer with 148 goals.

In 2022–23, Dolk helped his side reach the final of the Swedish Handball Cup, where Hammarby lost to IFK Kristianstad after two legs.

== Honours ==
Hammarby IF

- Swedish Handball League:
  - Gold: 2006–07, 2007–08
- Swedish Handball Cup:
  - Silver: 2022–23

KIF Kolding

- Danish Handball League:
  - Gold: 2014–15
