= Simon Möller =

Swedish handball player (born 2000)

Personal information
- Nationality: Swedish
- Born: 2 July 2000 (age 26) Lübeck, Germany
- Height: 1.90 m (6 ft 3 in)

Sport
- Sport: Handball
- Position: Goalkeeper
- Current club: Fenix Toulouse

Youth career
- Years: Team
- –2017: IK Sävehof

Senior clubs
- Years: Team
- 2017–2024: IK Sävehof
- 2024–2026: Fenix Toulouse
- 2026–: SG Flensburg-Handewitt
National team
Years	Team	Apps	(Gls)
2024–	Sweden	5	(0)
Medal record
European Championship
Bronze medal – third place	2024 Germany
European U-18 Championship
Gold medal – first place	2018 Croatia
- Updated on 19 July 2024

Simon Möller (born 2 July 2000) is a Swedish handball player for Fenix Toulouse and the Swedish national team.

He is the older brother of fellow handball player Felix Möller, and son of earlier handball player Peter Möller. He was born in Germany because his father was playing for the German team VfL Bad Schwartau at the time.

== Achievements ==
- Swedish Handball League
  - Winner: 2019, 2021, 2024
  - Runner-up: 2023
- Swedish Handball Cup
  - Winner: 2022

Individual awards

- All-Star Team Handbollsligan 2022/23
