= Felix Möller =

Swedish handball player (born 2002)

Personal information
- Nationality: Swedish
- Born: 4 September 2002 (age 24) Henstedt-Ulzburg, Germany
- Height: 1.95 m (6 ft 5 in)

Sport
- Sport: Handball
- Position: Pivot
- Current club: Aalborg Håndbold
- Number: 20

Youth career
- Years: Team
- 2009–2019: IK Sävehof

Senior clubs
- Years: Team
- 2019–2024: IK Sävehof
- 2024–: Aalborg Håndbold
National team
Years	Team	Apps	(Gls)
2021–	Sweden	29	(51)
Medal record
European Championship
Gold medal – first place	2022 Hungary/Slovakia
- Updated on 5 February 2025

Felix Möller (born 4 September 2002) is a Swedish handball player for Aalborg Håndbold and the Swedish national team.

He is the younger brother of fellow handball player Simon Möller, and son of earlier handball player Peter Möller. He was born in Germany because his father was playing for the German team HSV Hamburg at the time.

== Career ==
=== IK Sävehof ===
Felix Möller started playing handball at IK Sävehof in 2009. With them he won the Swedish youth championship twice.

He made his senior debut for the team in the 2019-2020 season. In the 2020-21 season he won the Swedish championship with the club. In the 2021-22 season they won the regular season, but lost in the semifinals to Ystads IF.

In the 2023-24 season he once again won the Swedish championship.

=== Aalborg Håndbold ===
For the 2024-25 season he signed for the Danish club Aalborg Håndbold. In his first season he won the Danish Cup. Later the same season he won the Danish championship.

== National team ==
Felix Möller made his debut for the Swedish national team on 4 November 2021 in a 31-24 win against Poland.

He was then part of the Swedish team that won the 2022 European Championship. He was in the match squad for 5 matches, but played only a single minute.

At the 2025 World Championship he played 6 games, scoring 22 goals, when Sweden finished at a disappointing 14th.

== Achievements ==
- Swedish Handball League
  - Winner: 2021, 2024
  - Runner-up: 2023
- Swedish Handball Cup
  - Winner: 2022
- Danish Handball League
  - Winner: 2025, 2026
- Danish Handball Cup
  - Winner: 2025
- Danish Super Cup
  - Winner: 2025, 2026

Individual awards

- All-Star Team Handbollsligan 2022/23
