= 2006–07 Elitserien (men's handball) =

Swedish handball season

Elitserien
- 2006–07

Tournament information
- Sport: Handball
- Teams: 14

Final positions
- Champions: Hammarby IF (2nd title)
- Runner-up: IFK Skövde

The 2006–07 Elitserien was the 73rd season of the top division of Swedish handball. 14 teams competed in the league. The eight highest placed teams qualified for the playoffs, whereas teams 11–12 had to play relegation playoffs against teams from the second division, and teams 13–14 were relegated automatically. Hammarby IF won the regular season and also won the playoffs to claim their second Swedish title.

== League table ==
Pos	Team	Pld	W	D	L	GF	GA	GD	Pts
1	Hammarby IF	26	19	2	5	880	764	116	40
2	IK Sävehof	26	18	1	7	794	726	68	37
3	Lugi HF	26	15	4	7	746	666	80	34
4	Redbergslids IK	26	14	3	9	755	708	47	31
5	Ystads IF	26	14	2	10	758	702	56	30
6	IFK Skövde	26	13	4	9	798	766	32	30
7	LIF Lindesberg	26	11	5	10	799	829	−30	27
8	IFK Trelleborg	26	11	4	11	750	775	−25	26
9	H 43 Lund	26	10	4	12	675	714	−39	24
10	Alingsås HK	26	10	3	13	733	779	−46	23
11	IF Guif	26	9	4	13	758	781	−23	22
12	HK Drott	26	7	3	16	691	744	−53	17
13	IFK Ystad	26	6	4	16	699	736	−37	16
14	IK Heim	26	3	1	22	692	838	−146	7

== Playoffs bracket ==
Quarterfinals
1	Hammarby IF	38	31	37
7	LIF Lindesberg	30	27	30
4	Redbergslids IK	31	21	37	17	26
5	Ystads IF	28	22	28	21	23
2	IK Sävehof	30	31	30
8	IFK Trelleborg	20	30	28
3	Lugi HF	27	19	28	27	21
6	IFK Skövde	26	24	24	32	31

Semifinals
1	Hammarby IF	35	31	37
4	Redbergslids IK	28	28	25
2	IK Sävehof	31	26	32	32
6	IFK Skövde	33	23	33	33

Final
1	Hammarby IF	34
6	IFK Skövde	22
