= Lucas Pellas =

Swedish handball player (born 1995)

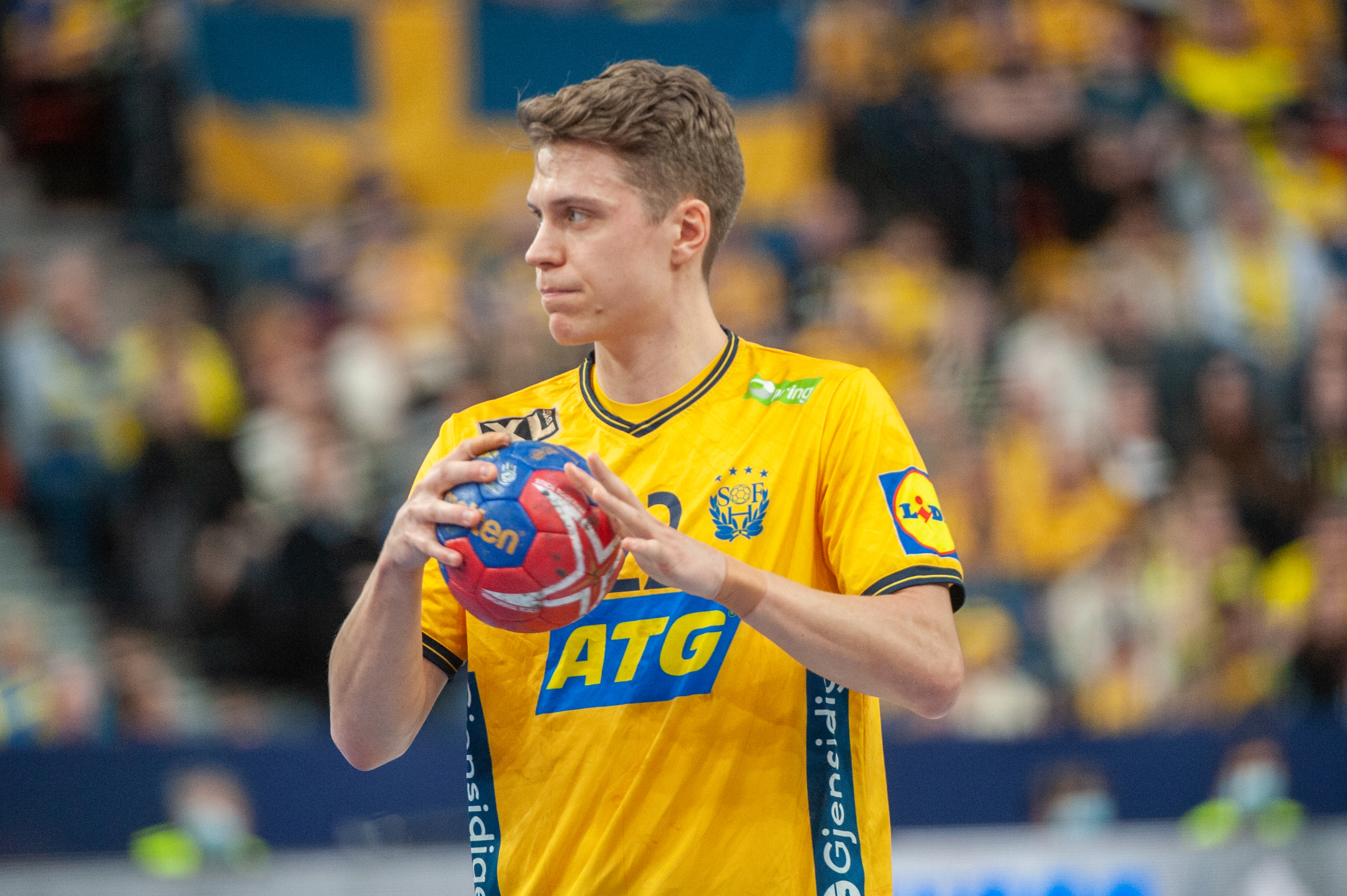

Personal information
- Full name: Lucas Kenneth Pellas
- Nationality: Swedish
- Born: 28 August 1995 (age 31) Stockholm, Sweden
- Height: 1.84 m (6 ft 0 in)

Sport
- Sport: Handball
- Position: Left wing
- Current club: GOG Håndbold
- Number: 10

Senior clubs
- Years: Team
- 2014–2016: Hammarby IF
- 2016–2020: Lugi HF
- 2020–2026: Montpellier Handball
- 2026–: GOG Håndbold
National team
Years	Team	Apps	(Gls)
2019–	Sweden	78	(251)
Medal record
European Championship
Gold medal – first place	2022 Hungary/Slovakia
Bronze medal – third place	2024 Germany
World Championship
Silver medal – second place	2021 Egypt
- Updated on 5 January 2025

Lucas Kenneth Pellas (born 28 August 1995) is a Swedish handball player for GOG Håndbold and the Swedish national team.

He won gold medals with Sweden at the 2022 European Championship. He also participated at the 2020 European Championship, the 2021 World Championship, the 2020 Summer Olympics, the 2023 World Championship, and the 2024 European Championship.

In February 2025 he tore his Achilles tendon, and was expected out in 6 to 12 months. He returned to the court on 3 September 2026 after 585 days.

In February 2026 he announced that he would join Danish club GOG Håndbold after the 2025-26 season to replace Frederik Bjerre who had been sold to Wisla Plock.

== Honours ==
- EHF European League:
  - Silver: 2025
- Coupe de France:
  - Gold: 2025
  - Silver: 2021, 2023

Individual awards

- All-Star Team as Best Left wing of Handbollsligan: 2018/19, 2019/20
- "Årets Komet" 2020
