= DOLK =

Dolk may refer to:

- Dolk (artist) (born 1979), Norwegian urban artist
- Dolichol kinase, an enzyme
- Fredrik Dolk (born 1961), Swedish actor
- Martin Dolk (born 1990), Swedish handball player
