= Robert Arrhenius =

Swedish handball player (born 1979)

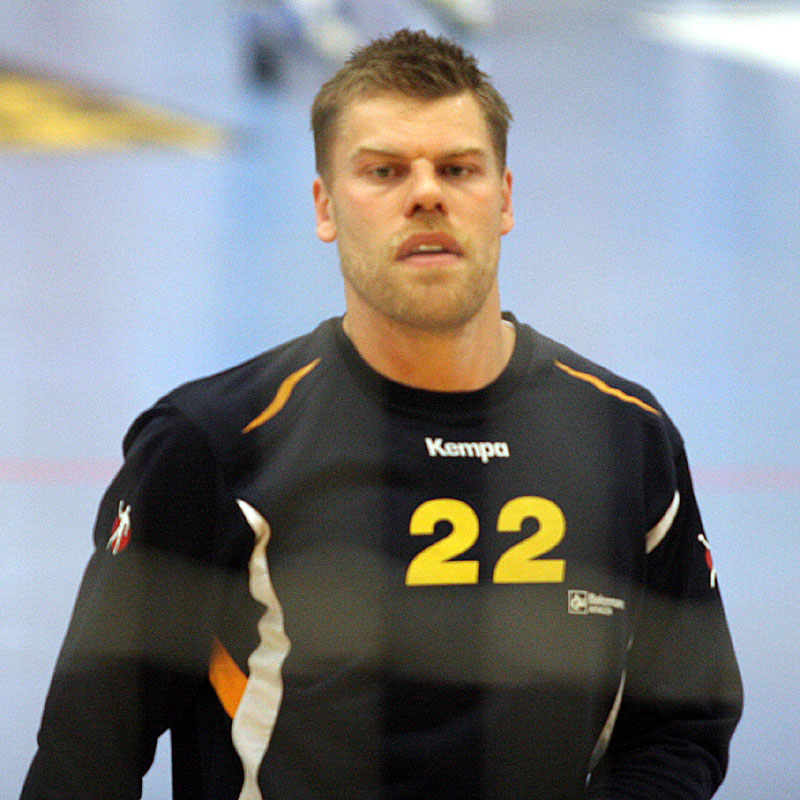
- Robert Arrhenius on 26 April 2009 in Gummersbach

Personal information
- Nationality: Swedish
- Born: 14 May 1979 (age 47) Skövde, Sweden
- Height: 1.95 m (6 ft 5 in)

Sport
- Sport: Handball
- Position: Pivot / Centre back
- Current club: Retired

Senior clubs
- Years: Team
- –2000: IFK Skövde HK
- 2000–2003: CB Cantabria
- 2003–2006: HSG Nordhorn
- 2006–2010: BM Aragón
- 2010–2011: THW Kiel
- 2011: BM Aragón
- 2011–2012: Bjerringbro-Silkeborg
- 2012–2014: IFK Skövde HK
- 2018–2019: Handbol Marratxí
National team
Years	Team	Apps	(Gls)
1998–2011	Sweden	192	(370)

Teams managed
- 2013–2014: IFK Skövde HK (player-coach)
- 2019–?: Al Ahly SC (player-coach)
- 2021–2023: IFK Skövde HK (technical coach)
- 2023–2024: IFK Skövde HK (assistant coach)

Robert Arrhenius (born 14 May 1979) is a Swedish former handball player and current assistant coach of IFK Skövde HK, where he was also a player.

== Career ==
Aarhenius debuted as a senior player for IFK Skövde HK in the Elitserien. In 2000 he joined Spanish side CB Cantabria. In 2003 he moved to Germany and joined HSG Nordhorn in the Bundesliga. Here he reached the semi-finals of the EHF Cup Winners' Cup, where they lost to eventual winners, Russian Chekhovskiye Medvedi.

He then returned to Spain to join BM Aragón. In December 2010 he joined German side THW Kiel for a mere 4 weeks on a loan to replace Marcus Ahlm, who had been injured. Afterwards he returned to BM Aragón for the rest of the season. He got to play 7 matches for the team.

In the summer 2011 Arrhenius joined Danish side Bjerringbro-Silkeborg, after BM Aragón had gotten into financial trouble and had to release him of his contract. After a year in Denmark he had his contract at BSH cancelled at his request due to familial reasons. He then returned to Sweden again to join his old club IFK Skövde HK. At the beginning of the 2013–14 season, he became a player-coach at the club under Peter Johansson. He retired at the end of the season, and continued as a coach.

In 2018 he made a short comeback for the Spanish Mallorca-based club Handbol Marratxí together with Magnus Jernemyr.

== Coaching career ==
In 2019 he became the assistant coach of the Egyptian club al Ahly SC under Ola Lindgren. In 2021 he returned once again to IFK Skövde HK to become the technical coach at the club, specialising in coaching the centre backs. From the 2023–24 season he was promoted to assistant coach.
