= Gustav Davidsson =

Swedish handball player

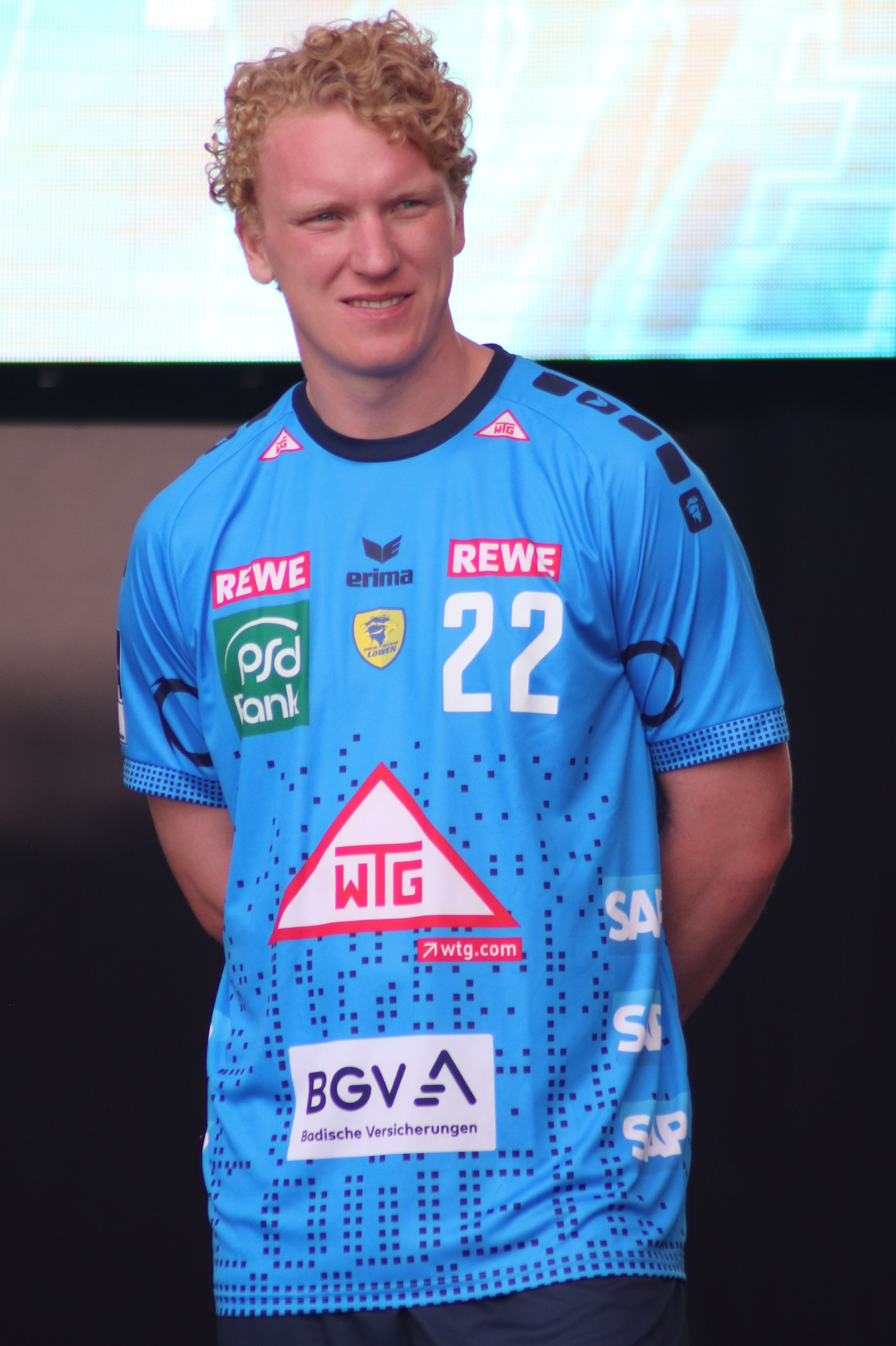

Personal information
- Full name: Gustav Nils Anders Davidsson
- Nationality: Swedish
- Born: 29 November 1999 (age 26) Stockholm, Sweden
- Height: 1.93 m (6 ft 4 in)

Sport
- Sport: Handball
- Position: Left back
- Current club: Rhein-Neckar Löwen
- Number: 22

Youth career
- Years: Team
- Åhus Handboll
- 2015–2018: IK Sävehof

Senior clubs
- Years: Team
- 2018–2019: IK Sävehof
- 2019–2023: Hammarby IF
- 2023–2025: Rhein-Neckar Löwen
- 2025–: Hammarby IF
National team
Years	Team	Apps	(Gls)
2023–	Sweden	2	(0)

Gustav Davidsson (born 29 November 1999) is a Swedish professional handball player for Rhein-Neckar Löwen and the Swedish national team.

He made his debut for the national team in March 2023.

== Achievements ==
- Swedish Championship
  - Gold: 2019
- Swedish Cup
  - Silver: 2023

Individual awards

- MVP of Handbollsligan 2022/23
- All Star Team as Best centre back of Handbollsligan 2022/23
