= Patrik Fahlgren =

Swedish handball player (born 1985)

Personal information
- Nationality: Swedish
- Born: 27 June 1985 (age 41) Gothenburg, Sweden
- Height: 1.88 m (6 ft 2 in)

Sport
- Sport: Handball
- Position: Centre back

Youth career
- Years: Team
- –2004: IK Sävehof

Senior clubs
- Years: Team
- 2004–2009: IK Sävehof
- 2009–2011: SG Flensburg-Handewitt
- 2011–2017: MT Melsungen
- 2017–2019: Hammarby IF
National team
Years	Team	Apps	(Gls)
2009–2015	Sweden	53	(67)

Teams managed
- 2018–: Hammarby IF

Patrik Fahlgren (born 27 June 1985) is a Swedish handball coach and former player. Since 2018 he's the coach of Hammarby IF.

== Career ==
Fahlgren started his career as a player for IK Sävehof, where he became Swedish champion twice. He then spent eight seasons in the German Bundesliga before he returned to Sweden. He started playing for Hammarby IF in 2017. His first season he became Top scorer of the Swedish league and was chosen as the MVP.

After one season he took over as player-coach. He spent one season as a player-coach before he proceeded to only coaching in 2019. After the 2018–19 season Hammarby had been relegated from the top Swedish league, but in 2020–21 Fahlgren led them to winning the second league and they were promoted back to the top league. In 2022–23 he led them to a silver medal in the Swedish Cup, and semifinals in the Swedish league play-offs. He was awarded with a spot in the league's All-Star Team 2022–23 as Best Coach.

== Honours ==
As player

- Swedish league
  - Winner: 2004, 2005

As coach

- Swedish Cup
  - Runner-up: 2023

=== Individual awards ===
As player

- MVP of the Swedish league: 2017–18
- Top scorer of the Swedish league: 2017–18
- All-Star Team as Best Centre Back of the Swedish league: 2007–08 and 2008–09

As coach

- All-Star Team as Best Coach of the Swedish league: 2022–23
