= Robin Hallberg =

Swedish handball player (born 1989)

Personal information
- Full name: Robin Christoffer Hallberg
- Nationality: Swedish
- Born: 19 August 1989 (age 37) Stockholm, Sweden
- Height: 1.95 m (6 ft 5 in)

Sport
- Sport: Handball
- Position: Goalkeeper

Youth career
- Years: Team
- –2006: Hammarby IF

Senior clubs
- Years: Team
- 2007–2011: Hammarby IF
- 2011–2013: Eskilstuna Guif
- 2013–2015: IL Runar Sandefjord
- 2015–2018: Hammarby IF
- 2019: Hammarby IF
National team
Years	Team	Apps	(Gls)
2009	Sweden U20	7	(0)

Robin Christoffer Hallberg (born 19 August 1989) is a Swedish former professional handball player who played as a goalkeeper. He represented Hammarby IF, Eskilstuna Guif, and IL Runar Sandefjord during a career that spanned between 2007 and 2019. A youth international for Sweden, he appeared seven times for the Sweden U20 team and represented his country at the 2009 Men's Junior World Handball Championship.

== Club career ==
Hallberg began his handballing career with Hammarby IF in 2007, helping them become Swedish champions during the 2007–08 Elitserien season. The following season, he represented the team in the group stage of the 2008–09 EHF Champions League as well as the EHF Cup Winners' Cup. In 2011, he signed with Eskilstuna Guif, and helped them finish at the top of the table during the 2011–12 regular season. He also represented the team in the EHF European Cup. In 2013, he left Sweden to play for IL Runar Sandefjord in Norway. Two years later, he returned to Sweden and Hammarby IF to wrap up his career and was named assistant captain.

Hallberg announced his retirement from professional handball in 2018. However, he made a brief comeback for the club in 2019.

== International career ==
Hallberg represented the Sweden U20 team a total of seven times in 2009, and helped the team finish fifth at the 2009 Men's Junior World Handball Championship in Egypt.

== Honours ==
Hammarby IF

- Swedish Champion: 2007–08
- Elitserien: 2007–08

Eskilstuna Guif

- Elitserien: 2011–12
