= Magnus Jernemyr =

Swedish handball player (born 1976)

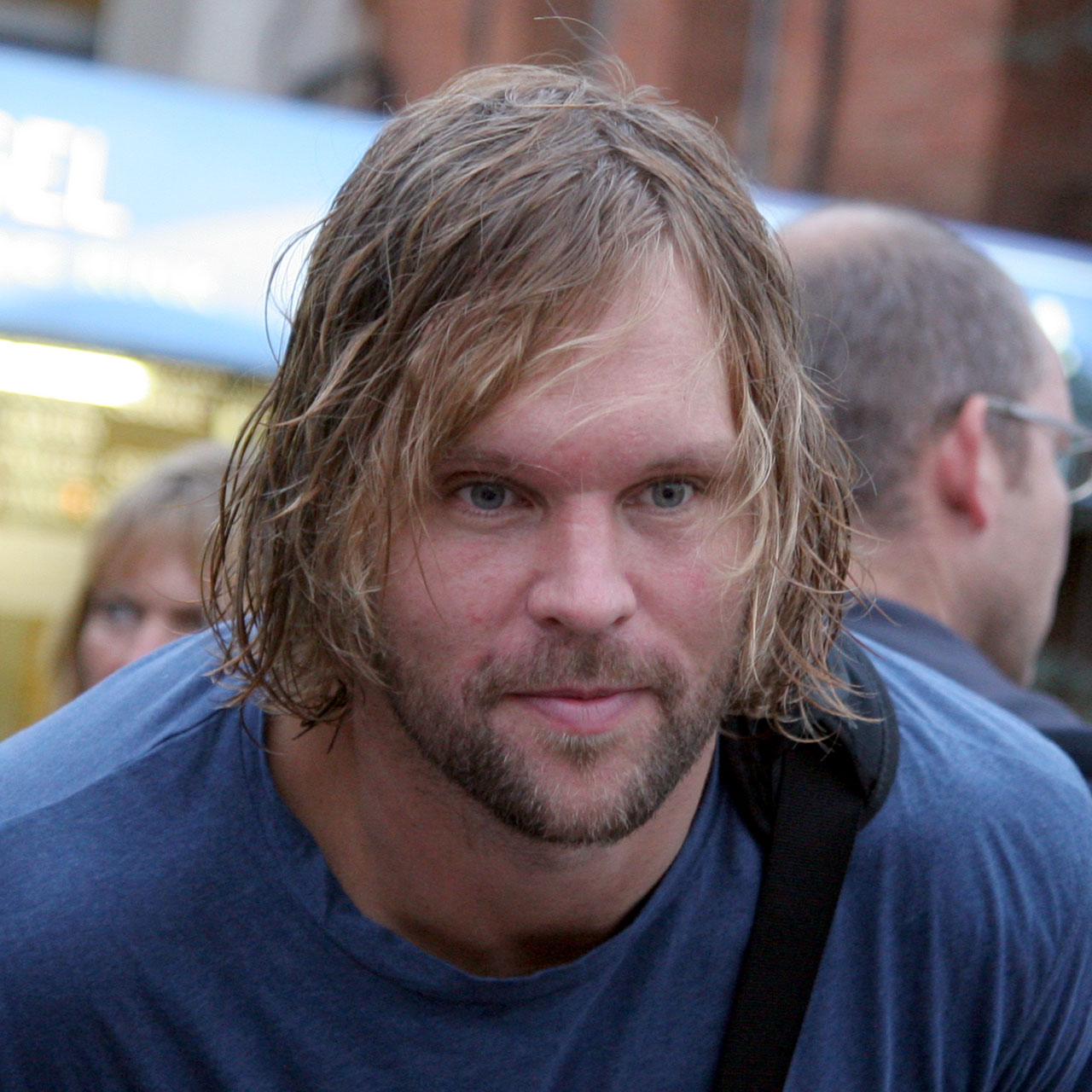
- Jernemyr in 2008

Personal information
- Nationality: Swedish
- Born: 18 July 1976 (age 50) Uppsala, Sweden
- Height: 2.00 m (6 ft 7 in)

Sport
- Sport: Handball
- Position: Pivot
- Current club: GWD Minden
- Number: 20

Senior clubs
- Years: Team
- 1994–2005: Redbergslids IK
- 2005–2007: Torrevieja
- 2007–2008: GOG Svendborg TGI
- 2008–2013: FC Barcelona
- 2013–2014: Lugi HF
- 2014–2017: GWD Minden
National team
Years	Team	Apps	(Gls)
2005–2014	Sweden	116	(5)
Medal record
Olympic Games
Silver medal – second place	2012 London	Team

Magnus Jernemyr (born 18 July 1976) is a Swedish retired handballer who played for the Swedish national team. During his playing career he played for Redbergslids IK and Lugi HF in Sweden, Torrevieja and FC Barcelona in Spain, GOG Svendborg TGI in Denmark, and GWD Minden in Germany. He won the Swedish Championship in 1995, 1996, 1997, 1998, 2000, 2001 and 2003. In 2012, he was selected as Liga ASOBAL's best defender. In that year, he was also part of the Swedish team that won the silver medal at the Olympic Games. In 2011 he won the EHF Champions League with FC Barcelona.

In 2018 he made a comeback to handball for the Mallorca based club Handbol Marratxí, together with Robert Arrhenius.

Meanwhile he has been a trotting coach.
