= Sebastian Karlsson (handballer) =

Swedish handball player

Personal information
- Full name: Sebastian Carl Percy Karlsson
- Nationality: Swedish
- Born: 21 January 1995 (age 31) Gothenburg, Sweden
- Height: 1.78 m (5 ft 10 in)

Sport
- Sport: Handball
- Position: Right wing
- Current club: Paris Saint-Germain
- Number: 10

Youth career
- Years: Team
- –2012: IK Sävehof

Senior clubs
- Years: Team
- 2012–2013: BM Gades
- 2013–2023: IK Sävehof
- 2023–2025: Montpellier Handball
- 2025–: Paris Saint-Germain
National team
Years	Team	Apps	(Gls)
2023–	Sweden	36	(105)
Medal record
European Championship
Bronze medal – third place	2024 Germany
U-20 European Championship
Silver medal – second place	2014 Austria
- Updated on 14 January 2026

Sebastian Carl Percy Karlsson (born 21 January 1995) is a Swedish handball player for Paris Saint-Germain and the Swedish national team.

== Achievements ==
- French league
  - Winner: 2026
- EHF European League
  - Silver medal: 2025
- Coupe de France
  - Winner: 2025
- Swedish Championship
  - Winner: 2019, 2021
- Swedish Handball Cup
  - Winner: 2022
- EHF Challenge Cup
  - Winner: 2014

Individual awards

- All-Star Team as Best Right wing of Handbollsligan: 2021/22 and 2022/23
- All-Star Team as Best Right wing of the 2013 Youth World Championship
