= Bertram Obling =

Danish handball player (born 1995)

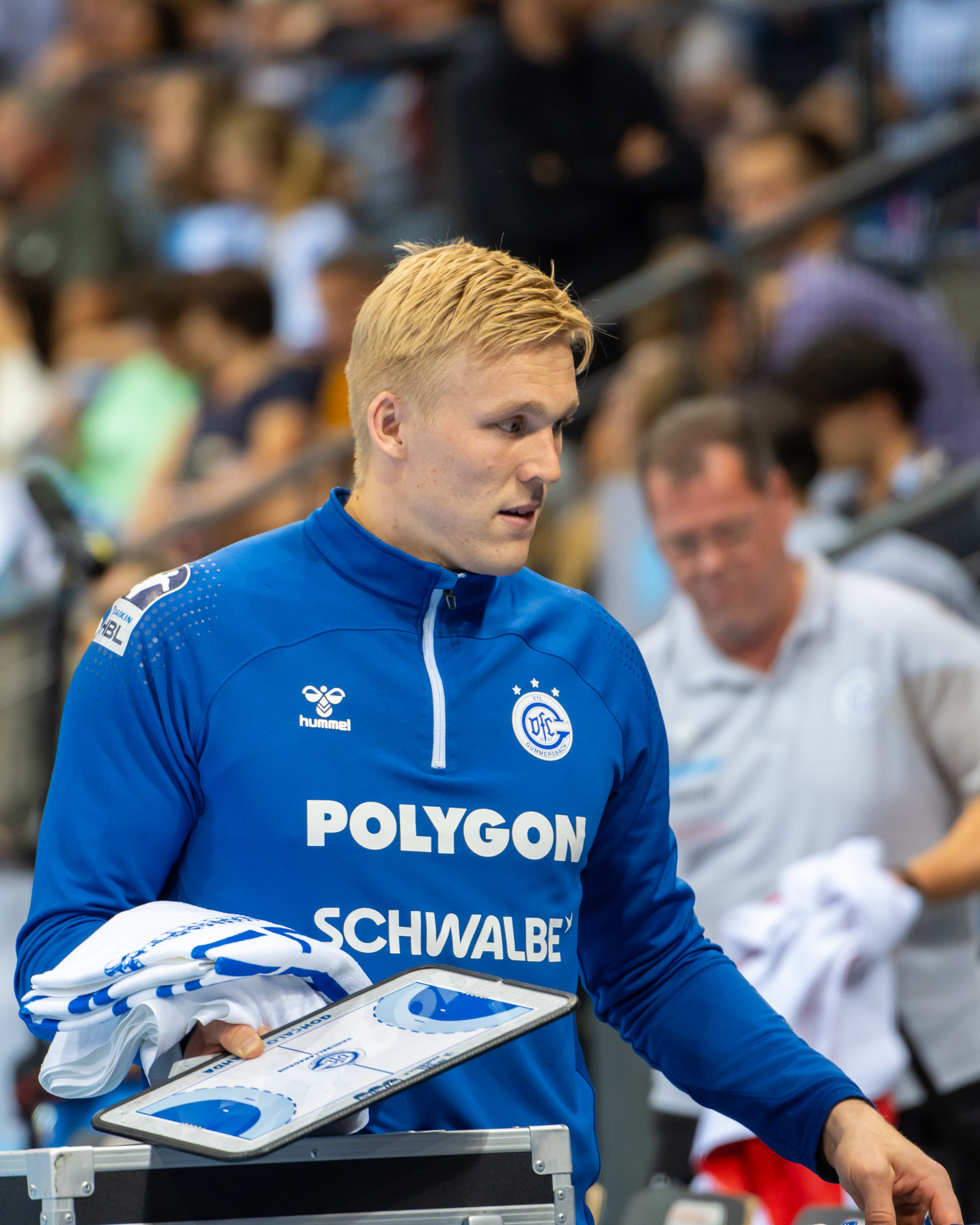

Personal information
- Nationality: Danish
- Born: 26 September 1995 (age 31) Aarhus, Denmark
- Height: 1.93 m (6 ft 4 in)

Sport
- Sport: Handball
- Position: Goalkeeper
- Current club: VfL Gummersbach
- Number: 16

Youth career
- Years: Team
- –: Skanderborg Håndbold

Senior clubs
- Years: Team
- –2019: Skanderborg Håndbold
- 2019–2020: Halden Topphåndball
- 2020–2022: IK Sävehof
- 2022–2024: HC Erlangen
- 2024–: VfL Gummersbach

Bertram Obling (born 26 September 1995) is a Danish handball player for VfL Gummersbach.

For the 2026 European Men's Handball Championship he was named as part of the preliminary squad.

== Achievements ==
- Swedish Handball League
  - Winner: 2021
- Swedish Handball Cup
  - Winner: 2022
- Danish Handball Cup
  - Runner-up: 2018

Individual Awards

- All-Star Team Handbollsligan 2021/2022
