= Göran Bengtsson =

Swedish handball player (born 1956)

Personal information
- Full name: Jan Göran Lennart Bengtsson
- Nationality: Sweden
- Born: 19 May 1956 (age 70) Varberg, Sweden

Sport
- Sport: Handball
- Position: Left wing

Youth career
- Years: Team
- –: HK Drott

Senior clubs
- Years: Team
- 1975–1993: HK Drott
National team
Years	Team	Apps	(Gls)
1978–1986	Sweden	136	(236)

Teams managed
- HK Drott: 1993–1996
- HK Drott: 2006–2007
- HK Varberg: 2012–2013

Göran Bengtsson (born 19 May 1956 in Varberg, Sweden) is a former Swedish handball player and coach who played all his active years in HK Drott. He was named Swedish player of the year in 1980/1981.

He is the father of Swedish handballplayer Tobias Bengtsson.

He competed in the 1984 Summer Olympics.

In 1984 he finished fifth with the Swedish team in the Olympic tournament. He played all six matches and scored six goals.

After his playing career he coached his former club HK Drott for three years between 1993 and 1996. Additionally he has also been a football coach in the Swedish club Tvååker for two years.

Afterwards he was the coach of HK Varberg where his son Tobias Bengtsson played.

In 2006 he returned to HK Drott for a single season after the former coach Daniel Lindgren was fired.
