= Kristian Svensson =

Swedish handball player (born 1981)

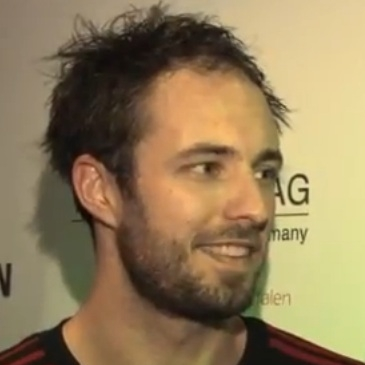

Personal information
- Full name: Kristian Svensson
- Nationality: Swedish (Sweden)
- Born: 10 May 1981 (age 45)
- Height: 188 cm (74 in)

Sport
- Sport: Handball
- Position: Right back

Senior clubs
- Years: Team
- 2001–2005: IFK Skövde
- 2005–2008: FCK Håndbold
- 2008–2010: AaB Håndbold
- 2010–2013: TuS Nettelstedt-Lübbecke
- 2013–2022: IFK Skövde
National team
Years	Team	Apps	(Gls)
2002–2011	Sweden	56	(89)

Teams managed
- 2021–2023: IFK Skövde (assistant)
- 2023–: IFK Skövde (head coach)

Kristian Svensson (born 10 May 1981) is a Swedish handball coach and former handball player. He is currently head coach for IFK Skövde.
