= Tina Flognman =

Swedish handball player (born 1981)

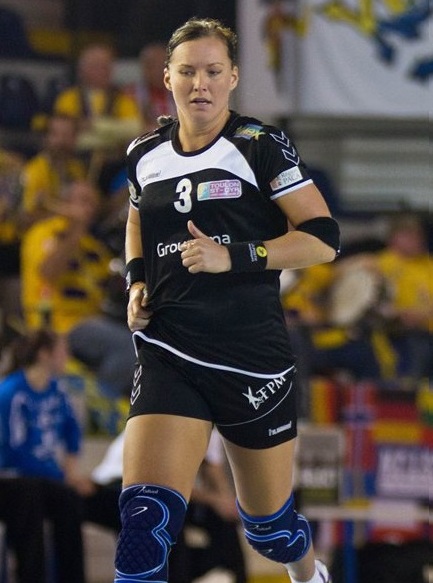
- Tina Flognman (2012)

Personal information
- Nationality: Swedish
- Born: 29 June 1981 (age 45) Forshaga, Sweden
- Height: 1.78 m (5 ft 10 in)

Sport
- Sport: Handball
- Position: Pivot
- Current club: Retired

Youth career
- Years: Team
- –: Forshaga HK
- –: IK Sävehof

Senior clubs
- Years: Team
- –2003: IK Sävehof
- 2003–2009: GOG Svendborg
- 2009–2010: Odense GOG
- 2010–2013: Toulon Saint-Cyr Var HB
- 2013: Viborg HK
- 2013–2014: HK Varberg
National team
Years	Team	Apps	(Gls)
2000–2012	Sweden	225	(388)
Medal record
European Championship
Silver medal – second place	2010 Denmark/Norway	Team
- Updated on 4 December 2012

Tina Flognman (born 29 June 1981) is a Swedish former handball player who played for the Danish clubs Viborg HK and GOG Håndbold, French Toulon Métropole Var Handball and IK Sävehof and HK Varberg in Sweden. She also featured in the Sweden women's national handball team.

She participated at the 2008 Summer Olympics in Beijing, where Sweden placed 8th. She competed at the 2009 World Women's Handball Championship, where Sweden placed 13th.

At the 2010 European Women's Handball Championship she reached the final and won a silver medal with the Swedish team. She was part of the Swedish handball team at the 2012 Summer Olympics, where they finished in 11th.
