= Lukas Karlsson =

Swedish handball player (born 1982)

Personal information
- Nationality: Swedish
- Born: 21 May 1982 (age 44) Nyköping, Sweden
- Height: 1.78 m (5 ft 10 in)

Sport
- Sport: Handball
- Position: Centre back
- Current club: Ribe-Esbjerg HH
- Number: 9

Youth career
- Years: Team
- –: IFK Nyköbing

Senior clubs
- Years: Team
- 2000–2007: Hammarby IF
- 2007–2008: Viborg HK
- 2008–2012: KIF Kolding
- 2012–2016: KIF Kolding København
- 2016–2019: Ribe-Esbjerg HH
- 2019–2020: Bækkelagets SK
- 2020–2022: Follo HK
National team
Years	Team	Apps	(Gls)
2003–2015	Sweden	93	(173)

Teams managed
- 2017–2019: Ribe-Esbjerg HH (Ass. Coach)
- 2019–2020: Bækkelagets SK (Ass. Coach)
- 2022–: Follo HK (Ass. Coach)

Lukas Karlsson (born 21 May 1982) is a Swedish former handball former player and current coach, who played for the Swedish national handball team.

== Career ==
Lukas Karlsson started playing handball at IFK Nyköbing in his hometown. In 2007 he joined Hammarby IF in the Swedish Elitserien. He then joined Danish club Viborg HK until 2009 when he switched to league rivals KIF Kolding. Here we won the Danish Championship in 2014 and in 2015 and the Danish cup in 2014.

In 2016 he joined Ribe-Esbjerg HH. Here he become the assistant coach in 2017, while still playing for the club. In 2019 he joined Norwegian club Bækkelagets SK. At the end of his career he joined Norwegian second tier side Follo HK.

From the 2022-23 season he retired as a player and became the headcoach of Follo HK.

== Private Life ==
Karlsson is married to Norwegian international Ida Bjørndalen. They have 3 children together.
