= 2019–20 Handbollsligan =

Handbollsligan
- 2019–20

Tournament information
- Sport: Handball
- Teams: 14

Final positions
- Champions: none
- Runner-up: none

The 2019–20 Handbollsligan was the 86th season of the top division of Swedish handball. 14 teams competed in the league. The eight highest placed teams would have qualified for the playoffs, whereas teams 11–13 would have had to play relegation playoffs against teams from the second division, and team 14 would have been relegated automatically. Alingsås HK won the regular season. Due to the COVID-19 pandemic, the league was abandoned after the second to last round of matches, the championship and relegation playoffs were cancelled, and no championship was awarded. HK Varberg finished last, but as they were not mathematically relegated by the time the league was abandoned, there was no relegation.

== League table ==
Pos	Team	Pld	W	D	L	GF	GA	GD	Pts
1	Alingsås HK	31	23	2	6	899	787	112	48
2	HK Malmö	31	23	1	7	868	762	106	47
3	IFK Kristianstad	31	23	0	8	865	751	114	46
4	IFK Skövde HK	31	22	2	7	866	770	96	46
5	Ystads IF HF	31	18	0	13	900	817	83	36
6	IK Sävehof	31	14	7	10	843	833	10	35
7	Lugi HF	31	15	3	13	835	820	15	33
8	IFK Ystad HK	31	16	1	14	826	818	8	33
9	Redbergslids IK	31	12	5	14	836	860	−24	29
10	IF Hallby	31	12	1	18	829	882	−53	25
11	Önnereds HK	31	8	0	23	796	914	−118	16
12	Eskilstuna Guif	31	6	3	22	809	920	−111	15
13	OV Helsingborg HK	31	6	1	24	804	896	−92	13
14	HK Varberg	31	6	0	25	741	887	−146	12

== Attendance ==
Team	Attendance
IFK Kristianstad	3805
IFK Skövde HK	1553
Alingsås HK	1462
Eskilstuna Guif	1404
IK Sävehof	1278
Lugi HF	1231
Ystads IF HF	1148
IF Hallby	1146
HK Varberg	1074
HK Malmö	1039
OV Helsingborg HK	968
Redbergslids IK	821
IFK Ystad HK	798
Önnereds HK	717
