= Michael Apelgren =

Swedish handball coach (born 1984)

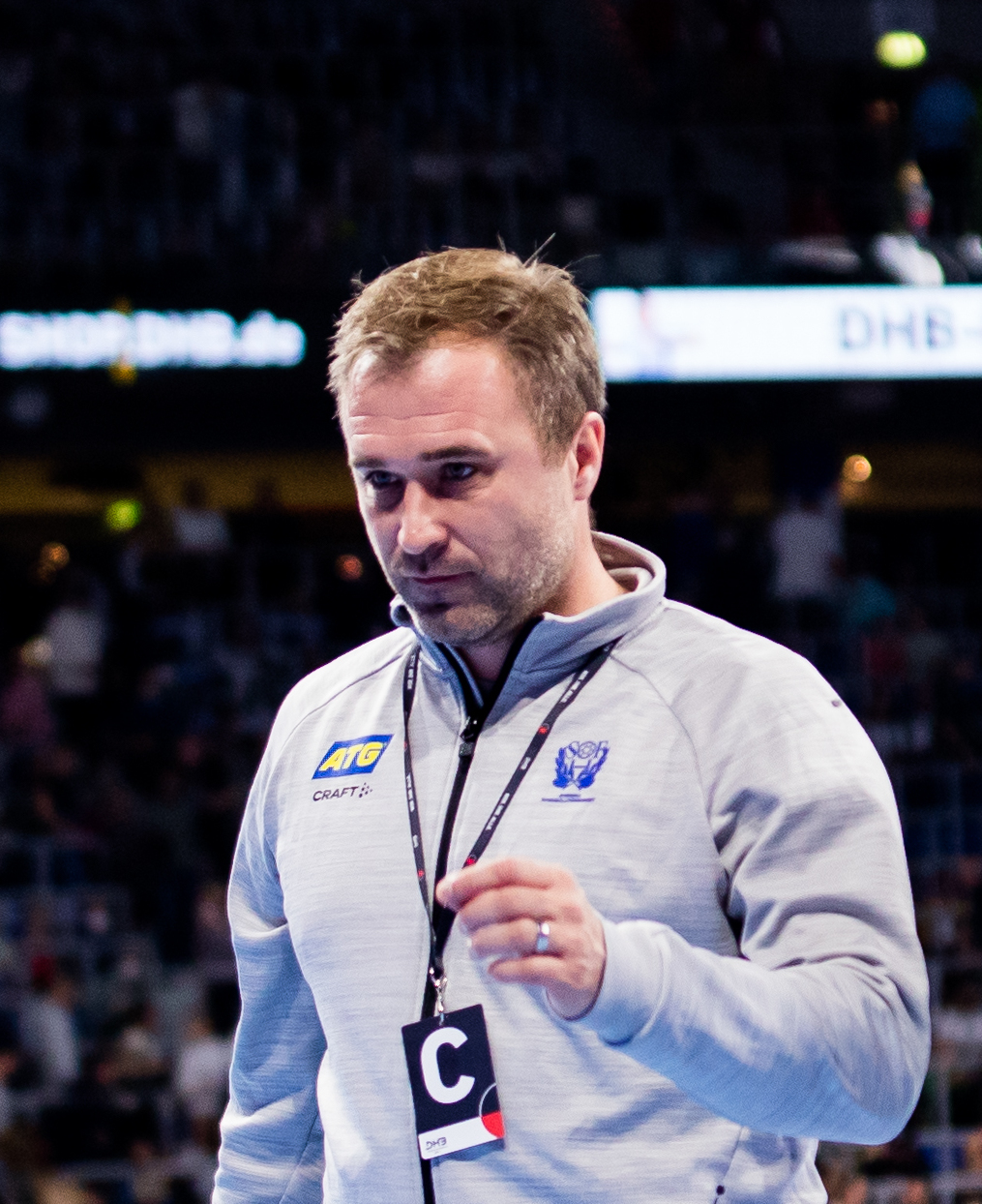

Personal information
- Nationality: Swedish
- Born: 20 June 1984 (age 42) Stockholm, Sweden
- Height: 1.81 m (5 ft 11 in)

Sport
- Sport: Handball
- Position: Centre back
- Current club: SC Pick Szeged (head coach)

Senior clubs
- Years: Team
- –2003: Djurgårdens IF
- 2003–2008: Hammarby IF
- 2008–2010: BM Granollers
- 2010–2013: IK Sävehof
- 2013–2014: CB Puerto Sagunto
- 2014–2016: Elverum Håndball
National team
Years	Team	Apps	(Gls)
2007	Sweden	5	(15)

Teams managed
- 2014–2020: Elverum Håndball
- 2020–2024: IK Sävehof
- 2022–2024: Sweden (assistant coach)
- 2024–: OTP Bank-Pick Szeged
- 2024–: Sweden
Medal record
Junior World Championship
Gold medal – first place	2003 Brazil

Michael Apelgren (born 20 August 1984) is a Swedish handball coach and former player. He's currently the head coach of SC Pick Szeged and the Swedish men's national team.

== Coaching career ==
Apelgren started his coaching career in 2014 as a player-coach for Elverum Håndball. After two years he ended his career as a player and continued coaching. He was six-time champion as coach of Elverum when he became coach of IK Sävehof in 2020. In the summer of 2022, he became assistant coach to head coach Glenn Solberg of the Swedish men's national team.

In May 2023, he was presented head coach for SC Pick Szeged from the summer of 2024.

== Personal life ==
Apelgren is the son of Spårvägen handballer Lena Paulsén and Hammarby footballer Per Apelgren, while his paternal grandfather, Tore Apelgren was also a footballer.

== Honours ==
=== As player ===
- Swedish league
  - Winner: 2006, 2007, 2008, 2011, 2012

=== As coach ===
- Norwegian league
  - Winner: 2015, 2016, 2017, 2018, 2019, 2020
- Norwegian Cup
  - Winner: 2018, 2019
- Swedish league
  - Winner: 2021, 2024
- Swedish Cup
  - Winner: 2022
- Hungarian Cup
  - Winner: 2025
