= Magnus Johansson (handball coach) =

Swedish handball coach (born 1969)

Karl Magnus Johansson
Personal information
- Nationality: Swedish
- Born: 15 December 1969 (age 56) Gothenburg, Sweden

Sport
- Sport: Handball
- Current club: Storhamar HE

Teams managed
- Years: Team
- 1995–1997: HP Warta
- 1997–2004: Redbergslids IK
- 2004–2006: FC Midtjylland Håndbold
- 2006–2008: Lugi HF
- 2008–2011: Sweden Women
- 2008–2012: IK Sävehof
- 2012–2016: IK Sävehof
- 2016–2018: Molde Elite
- 2018: CSM București
- ?-: Storhamar HE

Karl Magnus Johansson (born 15 December 1969) is a Swedish handball coach and was the head coach of Romanian women handball club CSM București.

== Coaching achievements ==
=== Club ===
- Swedish Handball Division – women:
  - Winner: 1997, 2009, 2010, 2011, 2012
- Swedish Handball League – men:
  - Winner: 1998, 2000, 2001, 2003
- EHF Cup Winners' Cup – men:
  - Finalist: 2003

=== National team ===
- European Championship – women's tournament:
  - Silver Medalist: 2010
