= Dolichol kinase deficiency =

- Other names: Hypotonia and ichthyosis due to dolichol phosphate deficiency
- This condition is inherited in an autosomal recessive manner.
- Specialty: Medical genetics

Dolichol kinase deficiency is a cutaneous condition caused by a mutation in the dolichol kinase gene.

It is also known as Congenital disorder of glycosylation 1m.

== See also ==
- CEDNIK syndrome
- List of cutaneous conditions
