= Staffan Olsson =

Swedish handball player (born 1964)

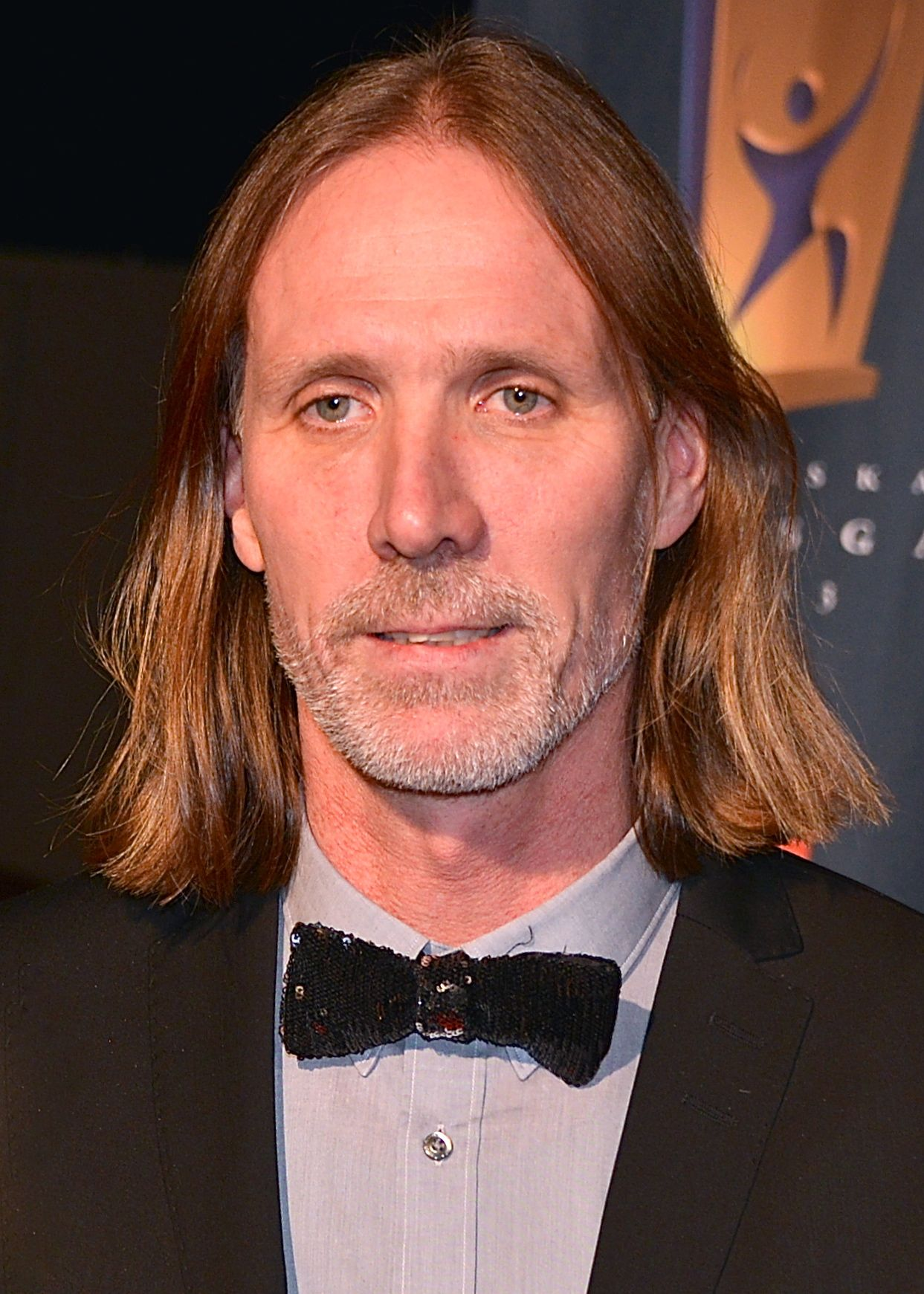
- Olsson in 2013

Personal information
- Full name: Erik Staffan Olsson
- Born: 26 March 1964 (age 62) Uppsala, Sweden
- Height: 1.99 m (6 ft 6 in)

Sport
- Sport: Handball
- Position: Right Back

Senior clubs
- Years: Team
- –1980: Skånela
- 1980–1989: HK Cliff
- 1989–1991: TV Hüttenberg
- 1992–1996: TV Niederwurzbach
- 1996–2003: THW Kiel
- 2003–2006: Hammarby
- loan: → Ademar León
National team
Years	Team	Apps	(Gls)
1986–2004	Sweden	358	(855)

Teams managed
- 2005–2011: Hammarby
- 2008–2016: Sweden (with Ola Lindgren)
- 2015–2018: Paris Saint-Germain (assistant)
- 2022–2026: Netherlands
Medal record
Olympic Games
Silver medal – second place	1992 Barcelona	Team
Silver medal – second place	1996 Atlanta	Team
Silver medal – second place	2000 Sydney	Team
World Championship
Gold medal – first place	1990 Czechoslovakia
Gold medal – first place	1999 Egypt
Silver medal – second place	1997 Japan
Bronze medal – third place	1993 Sweden
Bronze medal – third place	1995 Iceland
European Championship
Gold medal – first place	1994 Portugal
Gold medal – first place	1998 Italy
Gold medal – first place	2000 Croatia
Gold medal – first place	2002 Sweden

Erik Staffan Olsson (born 26 March 1964) is a Swedish handball coach and former player. Olsson, who always played with no 13, was a left-handed right backcourt player with one of the most feared shots of all the elite players. Later in his career he won praise for his great playmaking skills. He was inducted into the EHF Hall of Fame in 2024.

From September 2022 till September 2026 he was the head coach of the Netherlands' men’s national team.

== Playing career ==
Olsson was born in Uppsala. He started his career, at the age of 10, in the Swedish team Skånela. Other clubs are Huttenberg, Niederwurzbach, HK Cliff, THW Kiel and Hammarby. He played 358 caps (852 goals) with the Sweden men's national handball team.

After a long career in Germany, he returned to Sweden and played his final season in Hammarby Handball, a club he later coached to three consecutive national championships.

== Olympics ==
In 1988 he was a member of the Swedish handball team which finished fifth in the Olympic tournament. He played all six matches and scored 16 goals.

Four years later he was part of the Swedish team which won the silver medal. He played six matches and scored seven goals.

At the 1996 Games he won his second silver medal with the Swedish team. He played five matches and scored seven goals.

His last Olympic appearance was at the Sydney Games in 2000 when he won his third silver medal with the Swedish team. He played six matches and scored twelve goals.

== Resume ==
- Caps/Goals: 357/852 goals (1984–2002)
- World champion 1990 (in Prague, Czechoslovakia) and 1999 (in Cairo, Egypt)
- European champion 1994, 1998, 2000 and 2002
- World champion runner up 1997
- 3rd place in the 1993 and 1995 World championships
- German champion with THW Kiel 1998, 1999, 2000 and 2002
- Participated in four Summer Olympics: Seoul (1988), Barcelona (1992), Atlanta (1996) and Athens (2000)
- Swedish champion with Hammarby 2006, 2007 and 2008 (as coach)
