= 2007–08 Elitserien (men's handball) =

Swedish handball season

Elitserien
- 2007–08

Tournament information
- Sport: Handball
- Teams: 14

Final positions
- Champions: Hammarby IF (3rd title)
- Runner-up: IK Sävehof

The 2007–08 Elitserien was the 74th season of the top division of Swedish handball. 14 teams competed in the league. The eight highest placed teams qualified for the playoffs, whereas teams 11–12 had to play relegation playoffs against teams from the second division, and teams 13–14 were relegated automatically. Hammarby IF won the regular season and also won the playoffs to claim their third Swedish title.

== League table ==
Pos	Team	Pld	W	D	L	GF	GA	GD	Pts
1	Hammarby IF	26	19	1	6	861	739	122	39
2	IK Sävehof	26	17	2	7	795	713	82	36
3	Ystads IF	26	16	3	7	758	682	76	35
4	H 43 Lund	26	17	1	8	702	666	36	35
5	LIF Lindesberg	26	14	3	9	837	818	19	31
6	Redbergslids IK	26	13	4	9	753	712	41	30
7	Alingsås HK	26	14	0	12	741	721	20	28
8	IF Guif	26	13	2	11	751	752	−1	28
9	IFK Skövde	26	11	4	11	778	785	−7	26
10	HK Drott	26	9	2	15	736	816	−80	20
11	LUGI HF	26	9	1	16	727	759	−32	19
12	IFK Trelleborg	26	6	3	17	696	816	−120	15
13	HK Malmö	26	5	2	19	683	753	−70	12
14	OV Helsingborg	26	3	4	19	727	813	−86	10

== Playoffs bracket ==
Quarterfinals
1	Hammarby IF	25	24	33	25	28
8	IF Guif	24	25	27	29	27
4	H 43 Lund	37*	26	25	25
7	Alingsås HK	33	27	23	23
2	IK Sävehof	42*	31	29
5	LIF Lindesberg	41	28	23
3	Ystads IF	33	26	31	22
6	Redbergslids IK	25	34	21	21

Semifinals
1	Hammarby IF	32	30	29
4	H 43 Lund	28	29	23
2	IK Sävehof	36	29	25	25	25
3	Ystads IF	27	24	29	31	21

Final
1	Hammarby IF	35
2	IK Sävehof	29

- An asterisk (*) denotes result after extra time
