= Albin Lagergren =

Swedish handball player (born 1992)

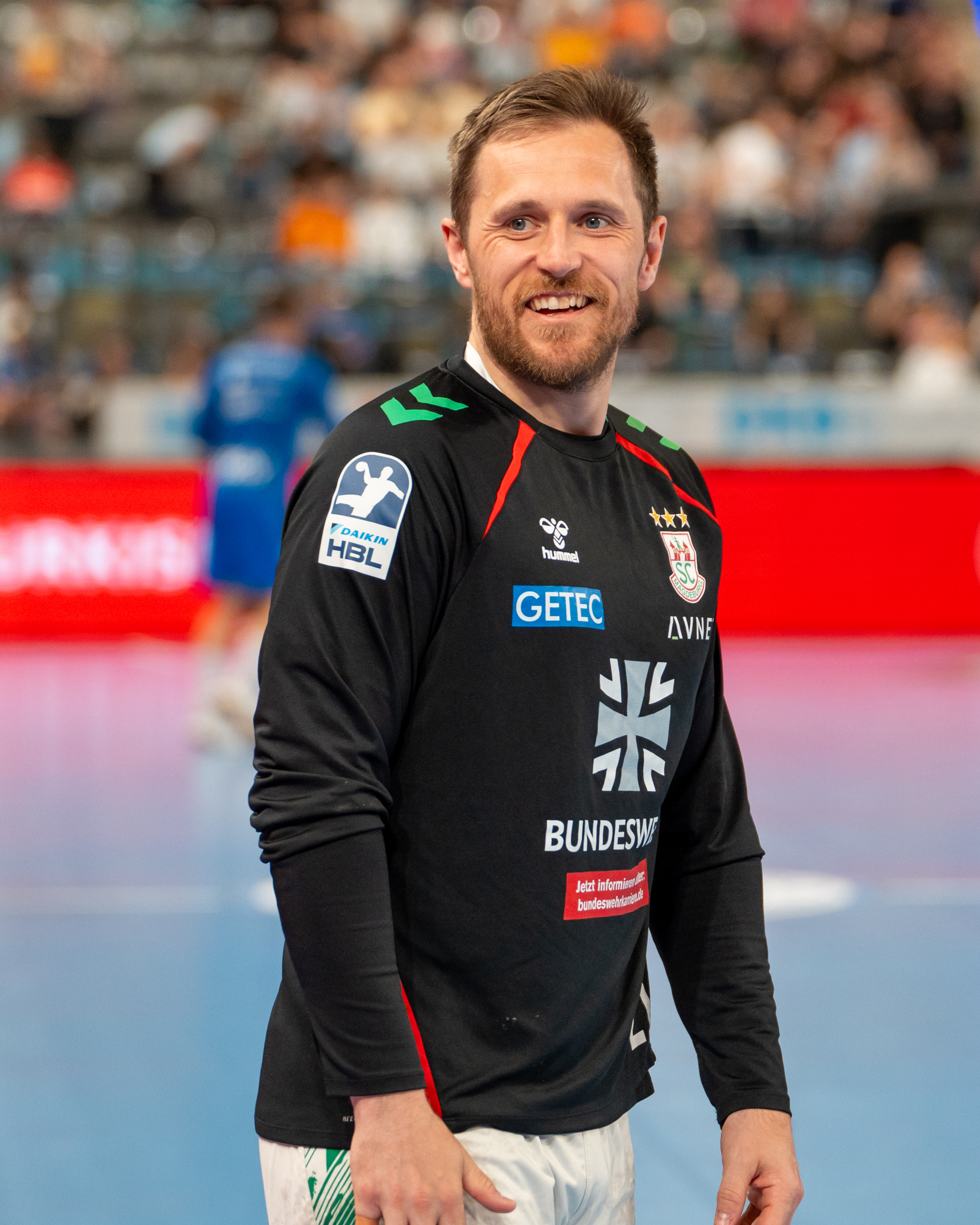

Personal information
- Nationality: Swedish
- Born: 11 September 1992 (age 34) Varberg, Sweden
- Height: 1.86 m (6 ft 1 in)

Sport
- Sport: Handball
- Position: Right back
- Current club: SC Magdeburg
- Number: 21

Senior clubs
- Years: Team
- –2011: HK Varberg
- 2011–2012: Redbergslids IK
- 2012–2013: HK Varberg
- 2013–2018: IFK Kristianstad
- 2018–2020: SC Magdeburg
- 2020–2023: Rhein-Neckar Löwen
- 2023–: SC Magdeburg
National team
Years	Team	Apps	(Gls)
2016–	Sweden	131	(410)
Medal record
World Championship
Silver medal – second place	2021 Egypt
European Championship
Gold medal – first place	2022 Hungary/Slovakia
Silver medal – second place	2018 Croatia
Bronze medal – third place	2024 Germany
- Updated on 14 January 2026

Albin Lagergren (born 11 September 1992) is a Swedish handball player for SC Magdeburg and the Swedish national team. He was named Swedish Handballer of the Year in 2025..

== Career ==
Lagergren started playing handball at his hometown club HK Varberg. In 2011 he joined Redbergslids IK for a season, only to return to HK Varberg in 2012.

A season later he joined IFK Kristianstad to play elite handball and develop further. Here he won the Swedish Championship in 2015, 2016, 2017 and 2018.

For the 2018/19 season he joined German team SC Magdeburg. In 2020 he joined league rivals Rhein-Neckar Löwen. Here he won the DHB-Pokal in 2023. The following season he returned to SC Magdeburg. Here he won the IHF Super Globe 2023, the DHB-Pokal and the German Handball-Bundesliga in the 2023/2024 season.

=== National team ===
He debuted for the Swedish national team in 2016 and was a part of the team that played World cup qualification matches against Bosnia-Herzegovina.

His first major international tournament was at the 2016 Olympics in Rio de Janeiro, where he was included due to Johan Jakobsson getting injured.

He participated at the 2017 World Men's Handball Championship, where he once again was included due to a Johan Jakobsson injury just before the tournament.

At the 2022 European Championship he won gold medals with Sweden.
