= Ola Lindgren =

Swedish handball player (born 1964)

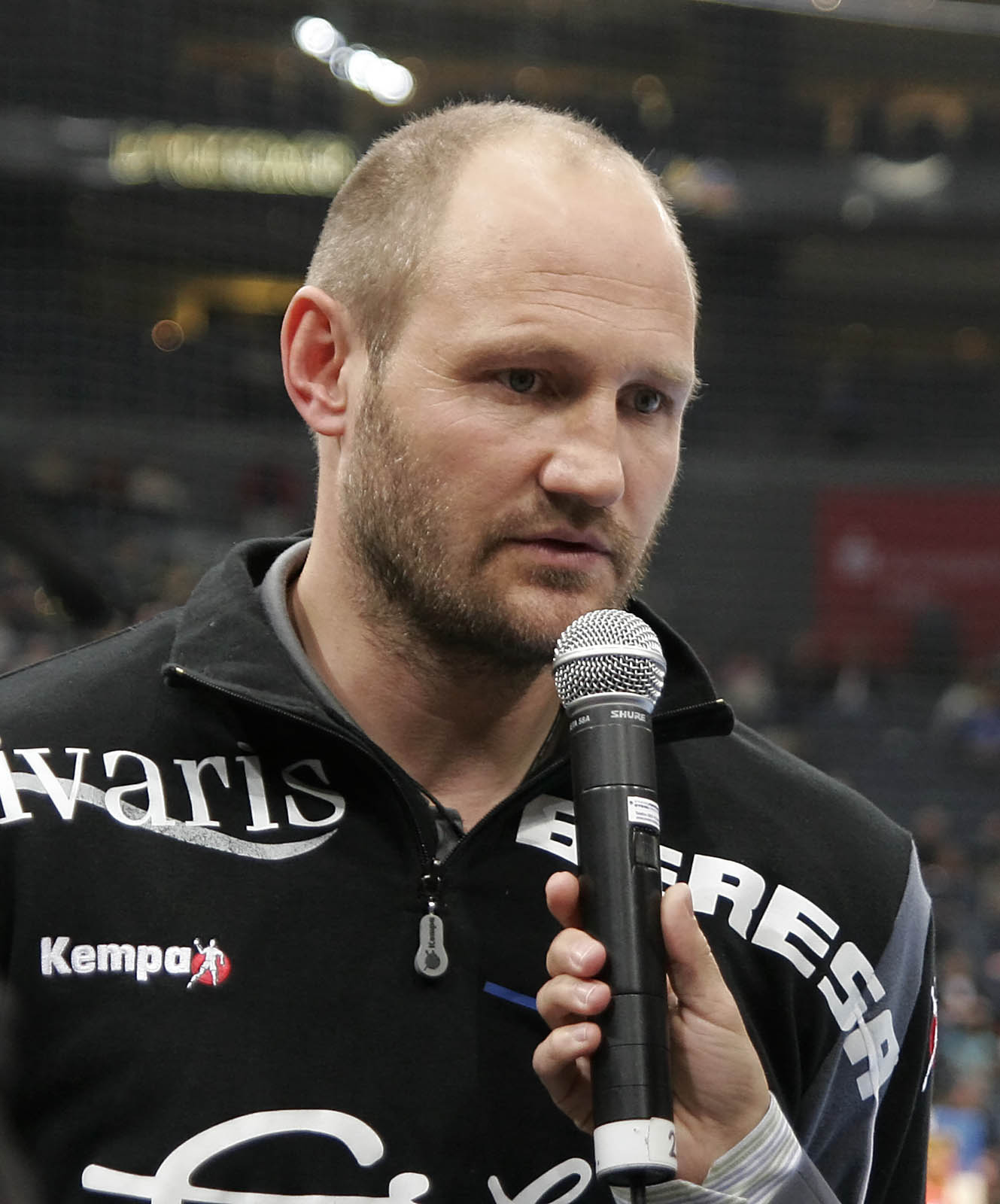

Personal information
- Full name: Per Ola Markus Lindgren
- Born: 29 February 1964 (age 62) Halmstad, Sweden
- Height: 1.92 m (6 ft 3 1/2 in)

Sport
- Sport: Handball
- Position: Left back

Senior clubs
- Years: Team
- 1981–1990: (Sweden) HK Drott
- 1990–1992: (Germany) TSV Dutenhofen
- 1992–1995: (Sweden) HK Drott
- 1995–1998: (Germany) HSG Düsseldorf
- 1998–2003: (Germany) HSG Nordhorn
National team
Years	Team	Apps	(Gls)
1986-2003	Sweden	376	(482)

Teams managed
- 1996–1998: (Germany) HSG Düsseldorf
- 2003–2009: (Germany) HSG Nordhorn
- 2008–2016: Sweden (with Staffan Olsson)
- 2009–2010: (Germany) Rhein Neckar-Löwen
- 2012–2019: (Sweden) IFK Kristianstad
- 2019–: Finland
- 2019–2020: (Egypt) Al Ahly
Medal record
Men's Handball
Representing Sweden
Olympic Games
Silver medal – second place	1992 Barcelona	Team competition
Silver medal – second place	1996 Atlanta	Team competition
Silver medal – second place	2000 Sydney	Team competition
World Men's Handball Championship
Gold medal – first place	1990 Czechoslovakia	Team
Gold medal – first place	1999 Egypt	Team
Silver medal – second place	1997 Japan	Team
Silver medal – second place	2001 France	Team
Bronze medal – third place	1993 Sweden	Team
Bronze medal – third place	1995 Iceland	Team
European Men's Handball Championship
Gold medal – first place	1994 Portugal	Team
Gold medal – first place	1998 Italy	Team
Gold medal – first place	2000 Croatia	Team
Gold medal – first place	2002 Sweden	Team

Per Ola Markus Lindgren (born 29 February 1964) is a Swedish former handball player and current coach. He has been the head coach for IFK Kristianstad since 2012 and was the head coach for Sweden from 2008 to 2016. As a player, he won two World Championships, four European Championships and participated in four Olympic Games. He also won four Swedish Championships with Drott.

He was included in the European Handball Federation Hall of Fame in 2023.

== Club career ==
Lindgren made his debut for Drott in 1981. He won Swedish Championships with the club in 1984, 1988 and 1990. In 1990 he joined German club TSV Dutenhofen but returned to Drott in 1992. He won a fourth Swedish Championship with Drott in 1994. He later played for German clubs HSG Düsseldorf from 1995 to 1998 and HSG Nordhorn from 1998 to 2003.

== International career ==
In 1988 he was a member of the Swedish handball team which finished fifth in the Olympic tournament. He played all six matches and scored ten goals. Two years later he was part of the team that won the World Championship, playing all seven matches and scoring 13 goals. He was part of the Swedish team which won the silver medal at the 1992 Olympics. He played all seven matches and scored twelve goals. At the 1993 World Championship, he was a member of the Swedish team that captured a bronze medal. He played six matches in the tournament and scored 15 goals. In 1994, he was part of the Swedish squad that won the inaugural European Championship. In 1996 he won his second Olympic silver medal with the Swedish team. He played six matches and scored three goals. He also won a silver medal at the 1997 World Championship. In 1998 he was part of the Swedish team that won their second European Championship. A year later, he won his second World Championship. In 2000, he was a member of the Swedish team that won their second consecutive European Championship. He made his last Olympic appearance in the same year when he won his third consecutive silver medal with the Swedish team. He played all eight matches and scored four goals. In 2001, he was part of the Swedish squad that won silver at the World Championship. He won his last international medal in 2002 as Sweden won their third consecutive European Championship.

== Coaching career ==
Lindgren started his coaching career as a player-coach for HSG Düsseldorf between 1996 and 1998. He coached HSG Nordhorn from 2003 to 2009 and won the 2007–08 EHF Cup with the club. He coached Rhein Neckar-Löwen from 2009 to 2010. In addition to his club coaching career, he was an assistant coach for Sweden from 2007 to 2008 and head coach from 2008 to 2016. During this time, Sweden reached the semi-finals of the 2011 World Championship and the final of the 2012 Summer Olympics. He became coach of Kristianstad in 2012 and won three consecutive Swedish Championships with the club from 2015 to 2017.
