= HK Varberg =

Estonian handball club

- Full name: Handbollsklubben Varberg
- Founded: 1973; 53 years ago
- Arena: Varbergs idrottshall
- President: Peter Ideböhn
- League: Allsvenskan (men's handball)

Handbollsklubben Varberg (HK Varberg) is a Swedish handball club from Varberg, Halland County. It was founded in 1973 after Varbergs BoIS closed their handball department.

The team played two seasons in the Handbollsligan, the top league of Sweden. In 2019-2020 they finished 14th out of 14, and should have been relegated, but due to the COVID-19 pandemic, there were no relegation that year. They were however relegated the following season

== Notable former players ==
- Göran Bengtsson
- Tobias Bengtsson (–2005, 2010–2020)
- Albin Lagergren (–2011, 2012–2013)
- Daniel Lindgren (–2005, 2015–2020)
