= Dolichol kinase =

Enzyme found in humans

DOLK

Identifiers
- Aliases: DOLK, CDG1M, DK, DK1, SEC59, TMEM15, dolichol kinase
- External IDs: OMIM: 610746; MGI: 2677836; GeneCards: DOLK
Enzyme activity
EC #	BRENDA	ExPASy	KEGG	MetaCyc
2.7.1.108	↗	↗	↗	↗

Gene location (Human)
Chr.	Chromosome 9 (human)
Band	9q34.11	Start	128,945,530 bp
Band	9q34.11	End	128,947,603 bp

Gene location (Mouse)
Chr.	Chromosome 2 (mouse)
Band	2|2 B	Start	30,174,243 bp
Band	2|2 B	End	30,176,346 bp
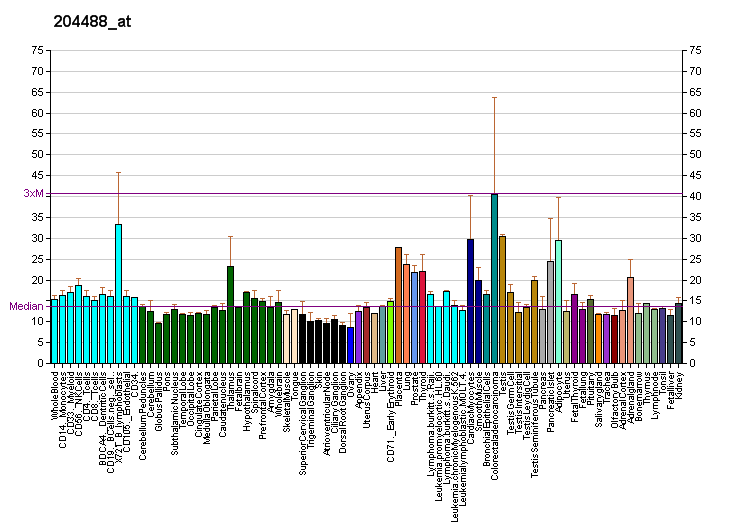
RNA expression pattern
Bgee	Human / Mouse (ortholog); Top expressed in: gonad; stromal cell of endometrium; right adrenal cortex; left adrenal gland; left adrenal cortex; islet of Langerhans; testicle; gingival epithelium; parotid gland; nasal epithelium / Top expressed in: interventricular septum; brown adipose tissue; external carotid artery; internal carotid artery; tunica adventitia of aorta; white adipose tissue; vastus lateralis muscle; intercostal muscle; subcutaneous adipose tissue; motor neuron; More reference expression data
BioGPS	More reference expression data
Gene ontology
Molecular function	transferase activity; protein binding; kinase activity; dolichol kinase activity
Cellular component	integral component of membrane; integral component of endoplasmic reticulum membrane; endoplasmic reticulum membrane; endoplasmic reticulum; membrane
Biological process	dolichyl diphosphate biosynthetic process; phosphorylation; protein glycosylation; dolichyl monophosphate biosynthetic process
Sources:Amigo / QuickGO
Orthologs
Databases	NCBI: entry; OMA: entry
Species	Human	Mouse
Entrez	22845	227697
Ensembl	ENSG00000175283	ENSMUSG00000075419
UniProt	Q9UPQ8	Q8R2Y3
RefSeq (mRNA)	NM_014908	NM_177648
RefSeq (protein)	NP_055723	NP_808316
Location (UCSC)	Chr 9: 128.95 – 128.95 Mb	Chr 2: 30.17 – 30.18 Mb
PubMed search
- Wikidata
View/Edit Human	View/Edit Mouse

dolichol kinase

Identifiers
- EC no.: 2.7.1.108
- CAS no.: 71768-07-5

Databases
- BRENDA: enzyme data
- ExPASy: NiceZyme view
- KEGG: enzyme entry
- MetaCyc: metabolic pathway
- Rhea: reactions
- PDB structures: RCSB PDB PDBe PDBsum
- Gene Ontology: AmiGO / QuickGO
Search
- PMC: articles
- PubMed: articles
- NCBI: proteins

In enzymology, a dolichol kinase (EC 2.7.1.108) is an enzyme that catalyzes the chemical reaction

CTP + dolichol $\rightleftharpoons$ CDP + dolichyl phosphate

Thus, the two substrates of this enzyme are CTP and dolichol, whereas its two products are CDP and dolichyl phosphate.

This enzyme belongs to the family of transferases, to be specific, those transferring phosphorus-containing groups (phosphotransferases) with an alcohol group as acceptor. The systematic name of this enzyme class is CTP:dolichol O-phosphotransferase. This enzyme is also called dolichol phosphokinase. This enzyme participates in N-glycan biosynthesis.

In humans dolichol kinase is encoded by the DOLK gene.

== Function ==
Dolichyl monophosphate is an essential glycosyl carrier lipid for C- and O-mannosylation and N-glycosylation of proteins and for biosynthesis of glycosylphosphatidylinositol anchors in endoplasmic reticulum (ER). Dolichol kinase catalyzes CTP-mediated phosphorylation of dolichol, the terminal step in de novo dolichyl monophosphate biosynthesis.

== Clinical significance ==
Mutations in DOLK cause a subtype of the congenital disorders of glycosylation, DOLK-CDG (CDG-Im).

== See also ==
- Dolichol kinase deficiency
