= Hammarby IF Handboll =

Swedish handball club

Hammarby Handboll
- Full name: Hammarby Idrottsförening Handbollsförening
- Short name: Hammarby
- Founded: 1897; 129 years ago; 1939; 87 years ago (team handball section)
- Arena: Eriksdalshallen, Stockholm
- Capacity: 2,600
- President: Mats Norrstad
- Head coach: Patrik Fahlgren
- League: Handbollsligan
- 2021–22: 7th
| Home | Away |

Hammarby IF Handboll is the handball section of Swedish sports club Hammarby IF from Stockholm. Hammarby IF currently play in Handbollsligan, Sweden's first tier.

The club won three consecutive Swedish championships from 2006 to 2008.

== History ==
The handboll section of Hammarby IF was founded on 31 October 1939. During the 1950s, the handboll section ceased its activities. The club made a comeback in the 1970s when another local team, Lundens BK, merged with the club.

Hammarby were promoted to Elitserien, Sweden's top tier, for the first time in 2002. In 2003, Hammarby signed the Swedish international Staffan Olsson, who returned to his native country after a long career in Germany. In 2004–05 Hammarby reached the semifinals, eliminating IF Guif in the quarterfinals before losing to IFK Skövde in the semifinals. The following season, Hammarby won their first Swedish championship, defeating IK Sävehof by 34–31 in the final, breaking the dominance of clubs from southern and western Götaland that had won all domestic titles since 1978. Olsson retired from playing in 2006, instead taking over as manager of Hammarby (a position that he stayed in until 2011). In 2006–07, Hammarby defended the title, winning the final against IFK Skövde by 34–22. They won their third consecutive title in 2008, again defeating IK Sävehof in the final, this time by 35–29. In 2008–09, Hammarby reached the semifinals, but were eliminated by Alingsås HK.

On November 14 2006, the match between Hammarby IF from Stockholm and LIF Lindesberg from Lindesberg was the highest scoring match ever in Elitserien. Hammarby won with the numbers 53–40. The total was 93 goals.

Between 2009 and 2018, Hammarby finished between 6th and 13th in the league and did not reached past the quarterfinals in the play-offs. In 2019, Hammarby was relegated to the second tier Allsvenskan, but won a promotion back to Handbollsligan two seasons later.

In 2023 Hammarby reached the final of the Swedish cup, a final played home and away against IFK Kristianstad. Hammarby won the away match 31–30, but in the home match they lost 35–32 after shoot-outs, and therefore got silver medal.

Location of Hammarby IF Handboll

=== Kits ===
HOME
| 2011–12 | 2014-18 | 2018- |

AWAY
| 2011–12 | 2014-18 | 2018- |

THIRD

2011–12

== Sports Hall information ==
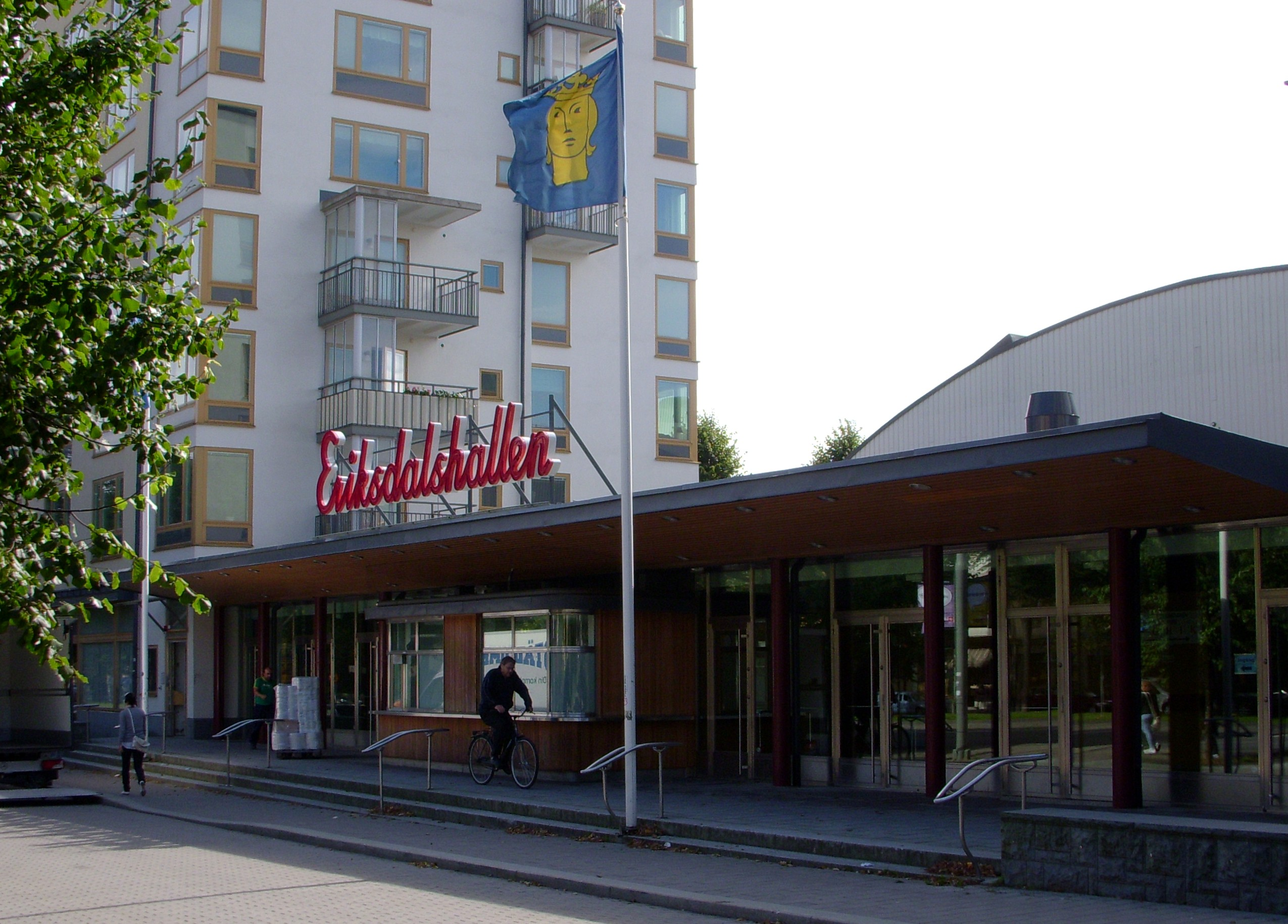
Home hall: Eriksdalshallen

- Name: – Eriksdalshallen
- City: – Stockholm
- Capacity: – 2600
- Address: – Ringvägen 70, 118 61 Stockholm, Sweden

== Current squad ==
Squad for the 2023–24 season

Goalkeepers

- 1 (Sweden) Linus Bergh
- 41 (Finland) Mikael Mäkelä

Left Wingers

- 9 (Sweden) Nils Pettersson
- 11 (Sweden) Martin Dolk
- 17 (Sweden) Ludvig Lindeberg

Right Wingers

- 10 (Sweden) Oliver Wigmark
- 15 (Sweden) Johan Nilsson

Line players

- 3 (Sweden) Kevin Johansson Eggan
- 5 (Sweden) Alexander Morsten

Left Backs

- 13 (Sweden) Max Gugolz
- 21 (Sweden) Anders Wiik Rydberg
- 30 (Sweden) Robin Sanderhem

Centre Backs

- 14 (Sweden) Henrik Olsson
- 22 (Sweden) Viktor Ahlstrand
- 46 (Sweden) Mattias Windahl
- 91 (Sweden) Josef Pujol

Right Backs

- 7 (Sweden) Richard Lindström
- 18 (Sweden) Edwin Aspenbäck

=== Transfers ===
Transfers for the 2026–27 season

Joining

- (Sweden) Elliot Stenmalm (LB) from (Sweden) IFK Kristianstad

Leaving

=== Transfer History ===
Transfers for the 2025–26 season

Joining

- (Sweden) Gustav Davidsson (LB) from (Germany) Rhein-Neckar Löwen

Leaving

- (Portugal) Vasco Costa (LB) loan back to (Portugal) FC Porto

=== Technical staff ===
| Name | Role |
|---|---|
| Kalle Matsson | Sporting director |
| Patrik Fahlgren | Head coach |
| Martin Norrbom | Goalkeeping coach |
| Sonny Andersson | Fitness coach |

== Notable players ==
- Michael Apelgren (2003–2008)
- Martin Dolk (2006–2014, 2015–)
- Patrik Fahlgren (2017-2019, coach 2018–)
- Lukas Karlsson (2000–2007)
- Tobias Karlsson (2003–2008)
- Fredrik Larsson (2005–2009)
- Staffan Olsson (2003–2006, coach 2005–2011)
- Lucas Pellas (2014–2016)
- Fredric Pettersson (2008–2011)
- Josef Pujol (2005–2016, 2023–)

== Honours ==
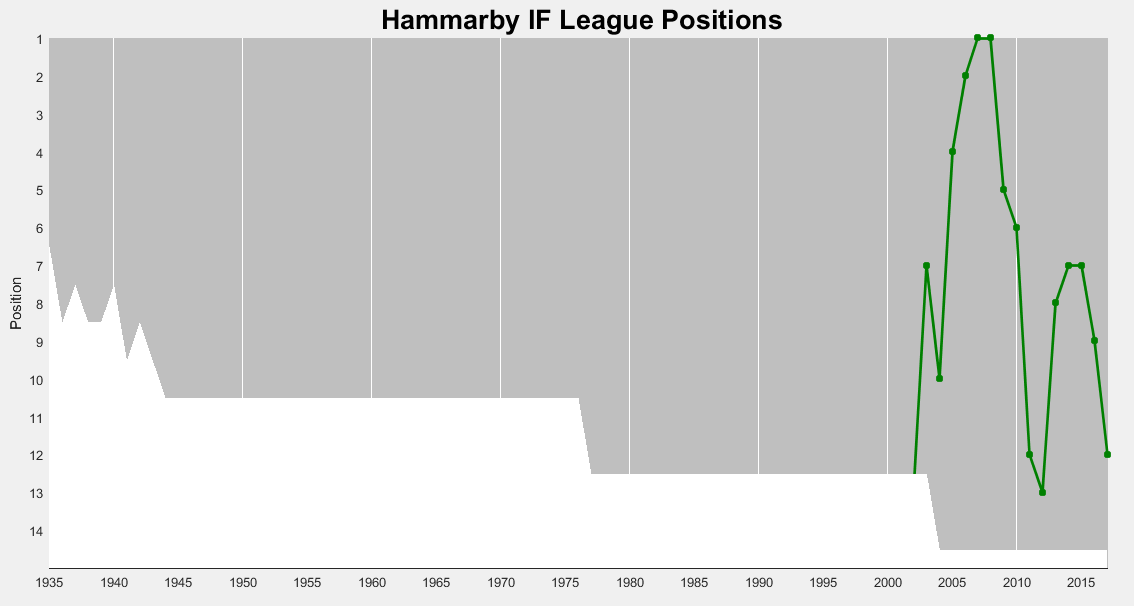
Hammarby's positions in the top division

- Swedish Champions
  - Winners (3): 2006, 2007, 2008
- Swedish Cup
  - Runner-ups (1): 2023
