= IFK Skövde =

Swedish handball club

- Full name: Idrottsföreningen Kamraterna; Skövde Handbollskubb
- Founded: 1907; 119 years ago, team handball section independent in 1907
- Arena: Arena Skövde, Skövde
- Capacity: 2,500
- Head coach: Kristian Svensson
- League: Handbollsligan
- 2024–25: 10th
Home	Away

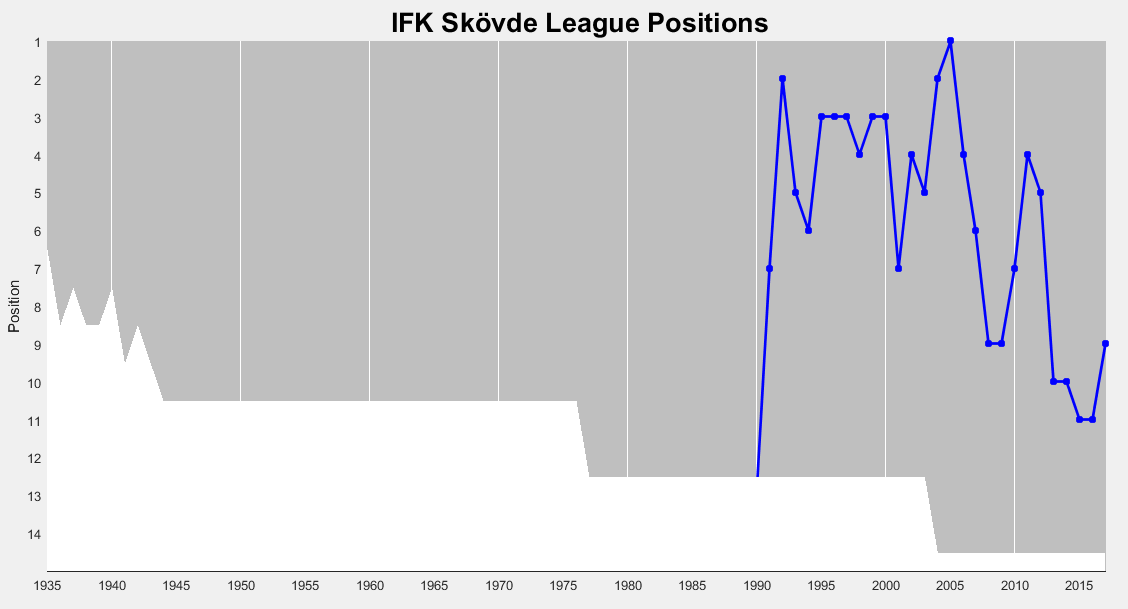
Skövde's positions in the top division

IFK Skövde is a Swedish handball club from Skövde whose roots can be traced back to 1907. The current organization, however, was reorganized in 1991. The team has been in the Handbollsligan (Swedish highest handball league) since the 1990/91 season, when it ended just outside the playoffs.

IFK Skövde has a faithful handball crowd, and IFK Skövde is usually found in the top ranking of the audience in the men's highest division. They reached the Swedish Championship final in 2005, 2007, 2021, and 2022 but never won.

== History ==
1907 On 23 September, IFK Skövde Handbolls Club ( Idrottsföreningen Kamraternas Skövdekrets XIII) was founded in Skövde Athletes and Sport Society at a meeting at Västra Folkeskolan in Skövde.

1975, the famous "condensation derby" was played in Division III between Skövde AIK and IFK in the Sports Hall. The match had to be canceled when just over 1 minute was left because the floor was too wet, due to all the condensation formed in the overflowing sports hall. A re-game could be played, in which SAIK won and continued to Division II.

1976 The juniors won the Swedish junior Championship for the first time with Gunnar Blombäck as a coach.

1979 IFK won home the series in the Old Division 3

1984 The club became the series' winners in Division 1 west before IK Sävehof, in the team were, amongst others, Gunnar Blombäck and Magnus Frisk. The premiere of the elite series was very good for IFK, where they defeated Härnösands club Brännan. In the pre-playoffs to qualify for the highest league, they were extremely close to the elite series but lost within the last minutes against IFK Kristianstad. Gunnar Blombäck missed a penalty, and Kristianstad could counter, won a free throw, and won the match by 25–24.

1987 The club won the Swedish Cup at home against HP Warta, which then played in the Swedish Elite League. This year, it again became a dire loss against IFK Kristianstad regarding qualifications for the Swedish Elite League.

1990 IFK was finally ready for Elitserien after the victory against BK Söder at home. The players were allowed to run a rev of honour in a crowded stadium.

1991 IFK Skövde was reorganized, and IFK Skövde Handboll became an independent association within IFK sports alliance.

1997 During a match during the 1996-97 Elitserien between IFK and Polisen / Söder, IFK coach Roger Carlsson suffered a heart attack and died immediately after. He is buried at Sankta Birgitta's Cemetery in Skövde. After this tragedy, former junior coach Jan "Proppen" Karlsson took over the role as head coach.

2001 Arena Skövde was opened which sparked emotions for IFK supporters who have experienced memories in the old sports hall.

2004 The team won the EHF Challenge Cup, after the final against French Dunkerque HBGL. They played in the finals in the same tournament in 1998.

2005 IFK Skövde won the Swedish elite series and went to the playoffs-final but lost to IK Sävehof.

2007 Was in the finals, but lost to Hammarby IF Handboll.

2008 The first time IFK missed the playoffs since the debut season in Elitserien in 1990/91.

2009 IFK had signed Ljubomir Vranjes as a coach. Ljubomir was then persuaded to become a sports director for SG Flensburg-Handewitt but as a patch on the wounds IFK and Flensburg made an agreement which meant that the team had a certain number of friendly games against each other plus IFK players had the chance to go to Flensburg and train with them (during certain periods). So IFK had to contract two home profiles to the coach posts instead.

2021 IFK Skövde was in the final of the highest league, nowadays called Handbollsligan, for the first time since 2007, but lost to IK Sävehof.

2022 IFK Skövde reached the final again, but lost to Ystads IF.

== Sports Hall information ==
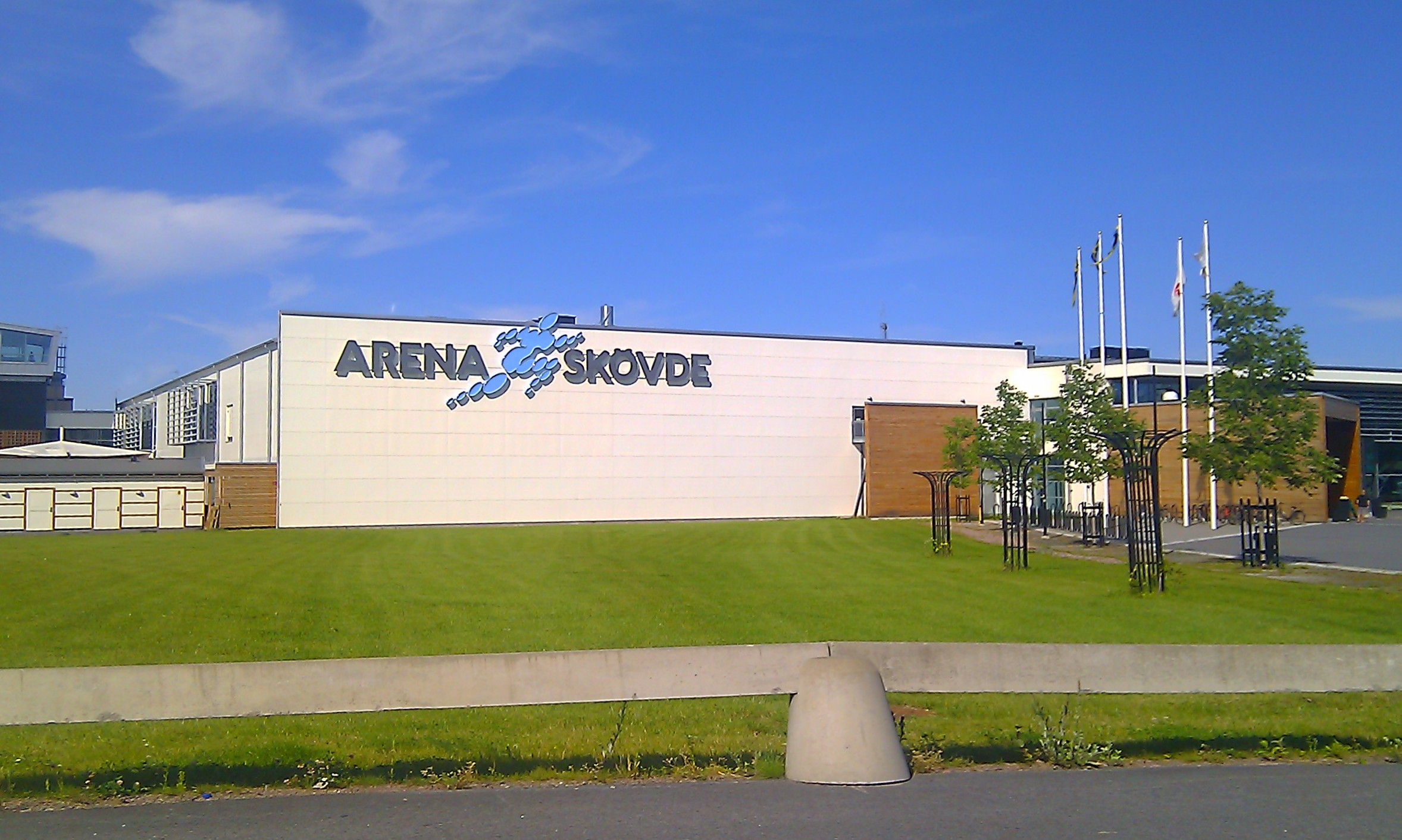
Home hall: Arena Skövde

- Name: – Arena Skövde
- City: – Skövde
- Capacity: – 2500
- Address: – Egnells väg 1, 541 41 Skövde

== Skadevi handbollscup ==
Skadevi Cup is a handball cup arranged in 2017 for the 41st year in a row. The cup is played every year in the all weekend hall. Participants are youth teams from Sweden, Norway, and Denmark.

== Team ==
=== Current squad ===
Squad for the 2026–27 season

Goalkeepers

- (Faroe Islands) Pauli Jacobsen

Left Wingers
Right Wingers

- (Sweden) Noel Gustafson

Line players

- (Sweden) Axel Franzén

Left Backs

- (Norway) Thomas Stenersen

Central Backs

- (Denmark) Jonas Kruse Kristensen

Right Backs

=== Transfers ===
Transfers for the 2026–27 season

Joining

- (Faroe Islands) Pauli Jacobsen (GK) from (Norway) Sandnes Håndballklubb
- (Norway) Thomas Stenersen (LB) from (Sweden) Västerås HF
- (Denmark) Jonas Kruse Kristensen (CB) on loan from (Denmark) Fredericia HK

Leaving

- (Norway) Håvard Åsheim (GK) to (Norway) Follo HK
- (Sweden) William Elovson (LB) to (Denmark) TMS Ringsted

=== Transfer History ===
Transfers for the 2025–26 season

Joining

- (Sweden) Axel Franzén (LP) from (Denmark) Ribe-Esbjerg HH
- (Sweden) Noel Gustafson (RW) from (Sweden) Eskilstuna Guif

Leaving

- (Sweden) Jesper Jensen (LP) to (Sweden) Amo Handboll
- (Sweden) Arvid Uusvoog (RW) loan back to (Sweden) IK Sävehof

== Coaches ==
Namn	År
Bengt Drath	1978–1982
Kjell E Larsson	1982–1986
Bengt Drath	1986–1987
Gunnar Blombäck	1987–1993
Jonny Gustavsson	1993–1995
Roger "Ragge" Carlsson	1995–1997
Jan "Proppen" Karlsson	1997–2000
Gunnar Blombäck	2000–2009
Henrik Schneider	2009–2013
Robert Arrhenius	2013–2014
Peter Johansson	2014–2015
Patrik Liljestrand	2015–2018
Jonas Wille	2018–2020
Henrik Signell	2020–2023
Kristian Svensson	2023–

== Handbollsligan ==
- Silver (2021, 2022)
- Semi-final (2019)

=== Elitserien ===
- Silver (2005, 2007)
- Semi-final (1992, 1995, 1998, 1999, 2000, 2001, 2003, 2004, 2006)

=== Challenge Cup ===
- Gold (2004)
- Silver (1998)

=== EHF Cup ===
- Quarter final (2005)

=== Youth ===
==== Junior-SM ====
- Gold (1976, 1992, 1993, 1998)
- Bronze (2002, 2010)

==== Pojk-SM ====
- Gold (2000, 2002)
