= Swedish Handball Cup =

- Founded: 1968
- Region: Sweden
- Teams: 32
- Qualifier for: EHF European League; EHF European Cup
- Current champions: Men's: IFK Kristianstad (2026); Women's: Boden IF (2026)
- Website: atgsvenskacupen.se

The Swedish Handball Cup (Swedish: Svenska cupen i handboll) is the nationwide cup tournament for handball teams in Sweden. It's also known as ATG Svenska cupen for sponsorship reasons. The competition was at first held 1967 to1971, 1979–1990 and then brought back in 2021.

The modern version of the cup starts pre qualification leading to a group phase, followed by a knockout stage where the teams face each other home and away in the last 16 and quarterfinals. From the 2023/24 season the semifinals, bronzematch and final is played as a Final four event.

== Past winners Men's Cup ==
Year	Winner	Runner-up
1967/1968	HK Drott	
1968/1969	Redbergslids IK (1)	
1969/1970	SoIK Hellas (2)	
1970/1971	Västra Frölunda IF (1)	
Not held 1972–1978
1979/1980	HK Drott (1)	
1980/1981	IFK Karlskrona (1)	
1981/1982	HK Drott (2)	
1982/1983	Dalhems IF (1)	
1983/1984	Västra Frölunda IF (2)	
1984/1985	HK Drott (3)	
1985/1986	HK Drott (4)	
1986/1987	IFK Skövde (1)	
1987/1988	Redbergslids IK (2)	
1988/1989	HK Drott (5)	
1989/1990	IF Saab (1)	
Not held 1991–2020
2021/2022	IK Sävehof (1)	Lugi HF
2022/2023	IFK Kristianstad (1)	Hammarby IF
2023/2024	Ystads IF (1)	Hammarby IF
2024/2025	Ystads IF (2)	Önnereds HK
2025/2026	IFK Kristianstad (2)	Ystads IF

== Past winners Women's Cup ==
Year	Winner	Runner-up
1979/1980	Stockholmspolisens IF	
1980/1981	Irsta HF (1)	
1981/1982	Irsta HF (2)	
1982/1983	Stockholmspolisens IF (2)	
1983/1984	HK Silwing/Troja (1)	
1984/1985	Stockholmspolisens IF (3)	
1985/1986	Tyresö HF (1)	
1986/1987	Tyresö HF (2)	
1987/1988	RP IF (1)	
1988/1989	Tyresö HF (3)	
Not held 1990–2020
2021/2022	Skuru IK (1)	Skara HF
2022/2023	IK Sävehof (1)	H65 Höör
2023/2024	IK Sävehof (2)	H65 Höör
2024/2025	H65 Höör (1)	Skuru IK
2025/2026	Boden IF (1)	Skara HF
