= IK Sävehof =

Swedish handball club

- Full name: Idrottsklubben Sävehof
- Short name: Sävehof
- Founded: August 20, 1950; 76 years ago
- Arena: Partille Arena
- Capacity: 4,000
- President: Stefan Albrehctson
- Head coach: Isabelle Gulldén (women's); Linus Ekman (men's)
- League: Handbollsligan (women's); Handbollsligan (men's)
- 2025–26: (gold) (women's); 4th (men's)
- Club colours
Home	Away
- Website [ Official site]

Idrottsklubben Sävehof better known as IK Sävehof is a Swedish professional handball club located in Partille. It is one of the most successful teams in Sweden on both the men's and women's sides. Their home matches are played at the Partille Arena which has a capacity of 4,000.

Location of IK Sävehof

== History ==
Idrottsklubben Sävehof was founded on August 20th 1950 by a group of students from Sävedalen.

In 1979 Stefan Albrechtson was elected chairperson, and he started the elite team on the men's side. In 1983 they reached the second highest Swedish league, Division 1, and in 1987 they were promoted to the top division.

In 1991 the women's team was promoted to the top Swedish division, and won their first national title in 1992-93.

The men's team became Swedish champions for the first time in the 2003-04 season.

In 2010, 2011 and 2012 both the women's and men's team won three Swedish championships in a row as the first Swedish club ever.

In 2014 the men's team won the EHF Challenge Cup beating Serbian RK Metaloplastika in the final.

== Women's team ==
The women's team competes in Svensk Handbollselit. They have won the championship a record 17 times (1993, 2000, 2006, 2007, 2009, 2010, 2011, 2012, 2013, 2014, 2015, 2016, 2018, 2022, 2023 and 2024) which is the record. The 2016 championship title was their eight in a row. They won the Swedish cup in 2023 and 2024.

They competed in the 2021–22 Women's EHF Champions League.

=== Kits ===
HOME
2018–19	2020–

AWAY

2012–13

=== European record ===
Season	Competition	Round	Club	Home	Away	Aggregate
2021–22	Champions League	Group stage (Group B)	(Russia) CSKA Moscow	23–32	28–29	7th place
2021–22	Champions League	Group stage (Group B)	(Norway) Vipers Kristiansand	23–42	25–34	7th place
2021–22	Champions League	Group stage (Group B)	(Slovenia) RK Krim Mercator	29–28	18–32	7th place
2021–22	Champions League	Group stage (Group B)	(Denmark) Odense Håndbold	31–37	24–37	7th place
2021–22	Champions League	Group stage (Group B)	(Hungary) Győri Audi ETO KC	25–31	19–41	7th place
2021–22	Champions League	Group stage (Group B)	(France) Metz Handball	28–31	21–35	7th place
2021–22	Champions League	Group stage (Group B)	(Turkey) Kastamonu Bld. GSK	28–26	29–26	7th place

=== Women's team ===
Squad for the 2026–27 season

Goalkeepers

- 12 (Sweden) Victoria Solli Berg
- 35 (Sweden) Wilma Saul

Wingers
RW

- 2 (Sweden) Ida Rahunen Sembe
- 26 (Sweden) Ia Hallqvist

LW

- 3 (Sweden) Stella Huselius
- 13 (Sweden) Tilde Skoog

Line players

- 11 (Sweden) Stina Wiksfors
- 20 (Sweden) Thea Blomst
- 23 (Sweden) Maja Portillo

Back players
LB

- 7 (Netherlands) Kim Molenaar
- 8 (Sweden) Hilma Knutsson
- 25 (Sweden) Emma Mihailovic
- 55 (Sweden) Felicia Granat

CB

- 5 (Sweden) Ida Landberg
- 6 (Sweden) Nova Huselius
- 9 (Iceland) Elín Klara Þorkelsdóttir
- 10 (Sweden) Alice Tördal

RB

- 14 (Sweden) Madeleine Rehnberg
- 19 (Sweden) Nina Koppang

=== Transfers ===
Transfers for the 2026-27 season

Joining

- (Sweden) Isabelle Gulldén (Head coach)

Leaving

- (Sweden) Andreas Wallin (Head coach)
- (Sweden) Nina Dano (RB) (to (Denmark) HØJ Elite)

=== Top scorers in the EHF Champions League ===
(All-Time) – Last updated on after the 2023/24 season

Rank	Name	Seasons played	Goals
1	(Sweden) Jamina Roberts	5	223
2	(Sweden) Ida Odén	5	211
3	(Sweden) Louise Sand	5	140
4	(Sweden) Jenny Alm	3	126
5	(Sweden) Emma Ekenman-Fernis	4	119
6	(Sweden) Elin Hallagård	6	102
7	(Sweden) Julia Eriksson	3	85
8	(Denmark) Trine Mortensen	2	81
9	(Denmark) Laura Cecilie Jensen	2	80
10	(Sweden) Olivia Mellegård	4	75

== Men's team ==
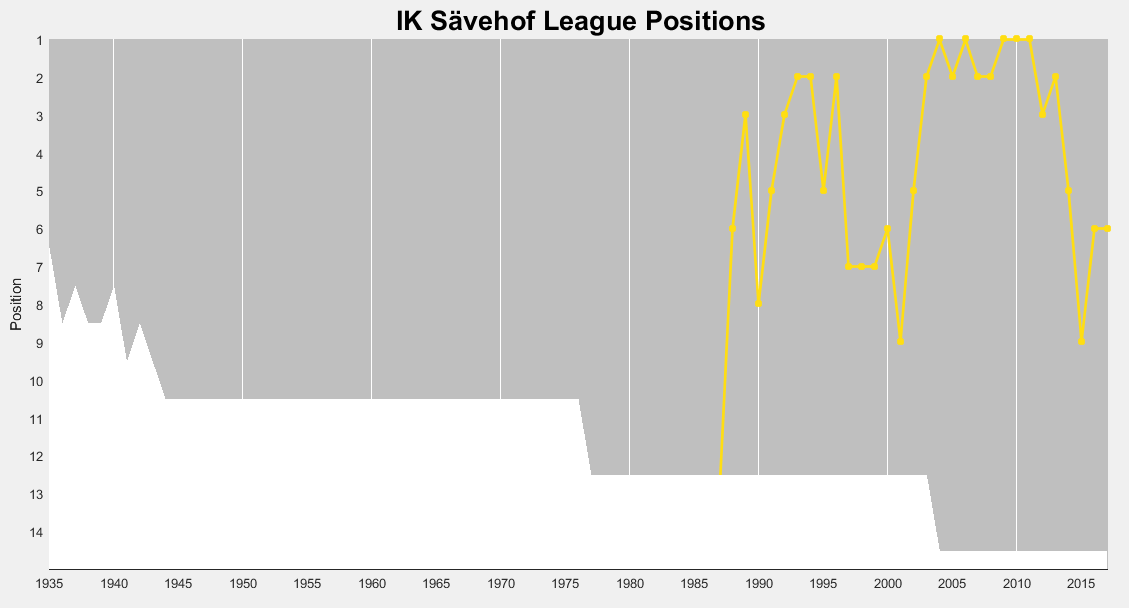
Sävehof's (men) positions in the top division

The men's team competes in Handbollsligan. They won the championship eight times, in 2004, 2005, 2010, 2011, 2012, 2019, 2021 and 2024. They won the Swedish cup in 2022. Their best international result was the victory in 2013-14 EHF Challenge Cup.

=== Kits ===
HOME
2015–18	2020–

AWAY

2011–13

=== Men's team ===
Squad for the 2023-24 season

Goalkeepers

- 1 (Sweden) Oscar Sävinger
- 12 (Sweden) Simon Möller

Wingers
LW

- 8 (Sweden) Kelvin Roberts
- 10 (Norway) Alexander Westby
- 17 (Sweden) Sebastian Spante

RW

- 11 (Sweden) Gustaf Wedberg
- 25 (Sweden) Malte Celander

Line players

- 6 (Sweden) Adam Blanche
- 7 (Sweden) Felix Möller
- 19 (Iceland) Tryggvi Þórisson
- 35 (Sweden) Philip Karlefeldt

Back players
LB

- 18 (Sweden) Pontus Brolin
- 77 (Sweden) Lukas Rådberg
- 78 (Faroe Islands) Óli Mittún

CB

- 5 (Sweden) Olle Ek
- 31 (Sweden) William Andersson Moberg

RB

- 3 (Sweden) Emil Berlin
- 13 (Sweden) Tobias Johansson
- 28 (Sweden) Marcus Lennernäs

=== Transfers ===
Transfers for the 2026–27 season

Joining

- (Sweden) Peter Johannesson (GK) from (Denmark) GOG Håndbold

Leaving

- (Faroe Islands) Ísak Vedelsbøl (LP) to (Denmark) HØJ Elite
- (Sweden) Oscar Sävinger (GK) to (Romania) Dinamo București

=== Transfer History ===
Transfers for the 2025–26 season

Joining

- (France) Tom Poyet (LP) from (France) USAM Nîmes Gard
- (Norway) Jesper Røisland (RB) from (Norway) Nærbø Håndball
- (Norway) Truls Grotta (CB) from (Sweden) HK Malmö
- (Iceland) Birgir Steinn Jónsson (LB) from (Iceland) UMF Afturelding
- (Sweden) Arvid Uusvoog (RW) back from loan at (Sweden) IFK Skövde
- (Sweden) Tobias Trommler (LP) back from loan at (Sweden) Västerås HF

Leaving

- (Faroe Islands) Óli Mittún (CB) to (Denmark) GOG Håndbold
- (Iceland) Tryggvi Thórisson (LP) to (Norway) Elverum Håndball
- (Sweden) Pontus Brolin (LB) to (France) Fenix Toulouse Handball
- (Sweden) Emil Berlin (RB) to (Portugal) Sporting CP
- (Sweden) Adam Blanche (LP) to (Norway) Kolstad Håndball
- (Sweden) Gustaf Wedberg (RW) to (France) USAM Nîmes Gard

== Former players ==
=== Women's team ===
- (Sweden) Johanna Ahlm (2004–2009, 2016–2019)
- (Sweden) Jenny Alm (2011–2015)
- (Sweden) Linn Blohm (2008–2014)
- (Sweden) Johanna Bundsen (2007–2017)
- (Sweden) Edijana Dafe (2011–2015)
- (Sweden) Tina Flognman (1998–2003)
- (Sweden) Hanna Fogelström
- (Sweden) Annika Fredén
- (Sweden) Cecilia Grubbström (2004–2012)
- (Sweden) Isabelle Gulldén (2007–2011)
- (Sweden) Elin Hallagård (2012–2019)
- (Sweden) Jessica Helleberg
- (Sweden) Filippa Idéhn (2012–2015)
- (Sweden) Gabriella Kain (2000–2006)
- (Sweden) Olivia Mellegård (2015–2019)
- (Sweden) Ida Odén (2005–2015, 2016–2018)
- (Sweden) Jamina Roberts (2009–2014, 2016–2017, 2020–2022)
- (Sweden) Loui Sand (2011–2017)
- (Sweden) Frida Tegstedt (2006–2014)
- (Sweden) Ulrika Toft Hansen (2008–2010)
- (Sweden) Frida Toveby
- (Sweden) Teresa Utković (1998–2003, 2007–2009)

=== Men's team ===
- (Sweden) Kim Andersson (2001–2005)
- (Sweden) Tommy Atterhäll (2002–2007)
- (Sweden) Patrik Fahlgren (2002–2009)
- (Sweden) Johan Jakobsson (2005–2011, 2017–2019)
- (Sweden) Peder Järphag (1988–1993)
- (Sweden) Jonas Larholm (2000–2006, 2016–2019)
- (Sweden) Jan Lennartsson (2000–2007)
- (Sweden) Johan Petersson (1990–1996)
- (Sweden) Per Öberg (1988–1992)

== Former coaches ==
=== Women's team ===
Seasons	Coach	Country
2008–2012	Magnus Johansson	(Sweden)
2012–2018	Henrik Signell	(Sweden)
2018–2022	Rasmus Overby	(Denmark)
2022–2024	Jesper Östlund	(Sweden)
2024–	Andreas Wallin	(Sweden)

=== Men's team ===
Seasons	Coach	Country
2001-2010	Rustan Lundbäck	(Sweden)
2012–2016	Magnus Johansson	(Sweden)
2016–2018	Robert Wedberg	(Sweden)
2018–2019	Andreas Stockenberg	(Sweden)
2019–2020	Jonas Larholm	(Sweden)
2020–2024	Michael Apelgren	(Sweden)
2024–	Linus Ekman	(Sweden)
