= Sweden men's national handball team =

Men's national handball team representing Sweden

Sweden

Information
- Association: Swedish Handball Association (Svenska Handbollförbundet)
- Coach: Michael Apelgren
- Assistant coach: Patrik Fahlgren; Daniel Larsson
- Most caps: Magnus Wislander (386)
- Most goals: Magnus Wislander (1191)

Colours
1st	2nd

Results

Summer Olympics
- Appearances: 10 (First in 1972)
- Best result: (silver) 2nd (1992, 1996, 2000, 2012)

World Championship
- Appearances: 27 (First in 1938)
- Best result: (gold) 1st (1954, 1958, 1990, 1999)

European Championship
- Appearances: 16 (First in 1994)
- Best result: (gold) 1st (1994, 1998, 2000, 2002, 2022)
- Last updated on Unknown.

Sweden men's national handball team
Medal record

Olympic Games
Silver medal – second place	1992 Barcelona	Team
Silver medal – second place	1996 Atlanta	Team
Silver medal – second place	2000 Sydney	Team
Silver medal – second place	2012 London	Team

World Championship
Gold medal – first place	1954 Sweden	
Gold medal – first place	1958 East Germany	
Gold medal – first place	1990 Czechoslovakia	
Gold medal – first place	1999 Egypt	
Silver medal – second place	1964 Czechoslovakia	
Silver medal – second place	1997 Japan	
Silver medal – second place	2001 France	
Silver medal – second place	2021 Egypt	
Bronze medal – third place	1938 Germany	
Bronze medal – third place	1961 West Germany	
Bronze medal – third place	1993 Sweden	
Bronze medal – third place	1995 Iceland	

European Championship
Gold medal – first place	1994 Portugal	
Gold medal – first place	1998 Italy	
Gold medal – first place	2000 Croatia	
Gold medal – first place	2002 Sweden	
Gold medal – first place	2022 Hungary/Slovakia	
Silver medal – second place	2018 Croatia	
Bronze medal – third place	2024 Germany	

World Outdoor Championship
Gold medal – first place	1948 France	
Silver medal – second place	1952 Switzerland	
Bronze medal – third place	1959 Austria	

The Sweden men's national handball team (Swedish: Sveriges herrlandslag i handboll) is Sweden's national team in men's handball and is controlled by the Swedish Handball Association. Its most successful periods were under coaches Curt Wadmark (1948–1967) and Bengt Johansson (1988–2004). The team under Bengt Johansson, nicknamed Bengan Boys in Sweden, is regarded as one of the finest national teams in the history of the sport with players like Tomas Svensson, Magnus Wislander, Staffan Olsson and Stefan Lövgren. From 1990 through 2002 the team reached the medal round in every championship (6 World Championships, 5 European Championships and 3 Olympic Games, earning 13 medals in total) and qualified for a record 8 championship finals in a row 1996–2002.

Sweden is the most successful nation at the European Men's Handball Championship with 5 titles, and has together with France won the most medals at the World Men's Handball Championship with a total tally of 12 medals, including 4 gold medals. Conversely, Sweden has yet to win an Olympic title despite participating in 4 finals (Sweden participated in the 1952 Summer Olympics in a demonstration match, defeating Denmark 19–11). The team has also won the World Cup 3 times, the Supercup 2 times, and were Intercontinental Cup winners in 2000.

== Honours ==
Competition	1st place, gold medalist(s)	2nd place, silver medalist(s)	3rd place, bronze medalist(s)	Total
Olympic Games	0	4	0	4
World Championship	4	4	4	12
European Championship	5	1	1	7
Total	9	9	5	23

== Competitive record ==
Champions Runners-up Third place Fourth place

=== Olympic Games ===
Games	Round	Position	Pld	W	D	L	GF	GA	GD
(Germany) 1936 Berlin	did not enter								
Not held from 1948 to 1968
(West Germany) 1972 Munich	Match for 7th place	7th of 16	6	2	2	2	82	87	−5
(Canada) 1976 Montreal	did not qualify								
(Soviet Union) 1980 Moscow	did not qualify								
(United States) 1984 Los Angeles	Match for 5th place	5th of 12	6	4	0	2	145	134	+11
(South Korea) 1988 Seoul	Match for 5th place	5th of 12	6	4	0	2	133	109	+24
(Spain) 1992 Barcelona	Runners-up	2nd of 12	7	6	0	1	165	130	+35
(United States) 1996 Atlanta	Runners-up	2nd of 12	7	6	0	1	182	141	+41
(Australia) 2000 Sydney	Runners-up	2nd of 12	8	7	0	1	240	197	+43
(Greece) 2004 Athens	did not qualify								
(China) 2008 Beijing	did not qualify								
(United Kingdom) 2012 London	Runners-up	2nd of 12	8	5	0	3	228	186	+42
(Brazil) 2016 Rio de Janeiro	Group stage	11th of 12	5	1	0	4	132	131	+1
(Japan) 2020 Tokyo	Quarter-finals	5th of 12	6	4	0	2	177	176	+1
(France) 2024 Paris	Quarter-finals	7th of 12	6	3	0	3	189	171	+18
(United States) 2028 Los Angeles	to be determined								
(Australia) 2032 Brisbane	to be determined								
Total	10/17	0 Titles	65	42	2	21	1673	1362	+211

=== World Championship ===
World Championship record
Year	Round	Position	Pld	W	D	L	GF	GA	GD
(Nazi Germany) 1938 Germany	Third place	3rd of 4	3	1	0	2	8	13	−5
1954 Sweden	Champions	1st of 6	3	3	0	0	56	36	+20
1958 East Germany	Champions	1st of 16	6	6	0	0	138	74	+64
1961 West Germany	Third place	3rd of 12	6	5	0	1	89	73	+16
1964 Czechoslovakia	Runners-up	2nd of 16	6	3	0	3	104	90	+14
1967 Sweden	Match for 5th place	5th of 16	6	4	0	2	118	112	+6
1970 France	Match for 5th place	6th of 16	6	3	0	3	69	68	+1
1974 East Germany	Preliminary round	10th of 16	6	3	0	3	111	113	−2
1978 Denmark	Second round	8th of 16	6	2	0	4	121	125	−4
1982 West Germany	Second round	11th of 16	7	2	1	4	159	157	+2
1986 Switzerland	Fourth place	4th of 16	7	5	0	2	174	153	+21
1990 Czechoslovakia	Champions	1st of 16	7	6	0	1	177	143	+34
1993 Sweden	Third place	3rd of 16	7	6	0	1	166	136	+30
1995 Iceland	Third place	3rd of 24	9	8	0	1	251	201	+50
1997 Japan	Runners-up	2nd of 24	9	7	0	2	253	187	+66
1999 Egypt	Champions	1st of 24	9	8	1	0	282	202	+80
2001 France	Runners-up	2nd of 24	9	8	0	1	263	207	+56
2003 Portugal	Second round	13th of 24	7	5	0	2	204	191	+13
2005 Tunisia	Main round	11th of 24	9	4	1	4	275	234	+41
2007 Germany	did not qualify								
2009 Croatia	Main round	7th of 24	9	6	0	3	277	232	+45
2011 Sweden	Fourth place	4th of 24	10	6	0	4	272	241	+31
2013 Spain	did not qualify								
2015 Qatar	Round of 16	10th of 24	6	3	1	2	157	133	+24
2017 France	Quarter-finals	6th of 24	7	5	0	2	233	166	+67
2019 Denmark/Germany	Main round	5th of 24	9	7	0	2	273	222	+51
2021 Egypt	Runners-up	2nd of 32	9	6	2	1	276	218	+58
2023 Poland/Sweden	Fourth place	4th of 32	9	7	0	2	299	237	+62
2025 Croatia/Denmark/Norway	Main round	14th of 32	6	2	2	2	195	173	+22
2027 Germany	Qualified								
2029 France/Germany	To be determined								
// 2031 Denmark/Iceland/Norway	To be determined								
Total	28/32	4 Titles	193	131	8	54	5000	4137	+863

=== European Championship ===
European Championship record
Year	Round	Position	Pld	W	D	L	GF	GA	GD
1994 Portugal	Champions	1st of 12	7	7	0	0	172	133	+39
1996 Spain	Fourth place	4th of 12	7	4	0	3	170	156	+14
1998 Italy	Champions	1st of 12	7	6	0	1	182	158	+24
2000 Croatia	Champions	1st of 12	7	7	0	0	198	167	+31
2002 Sweden	Champions	1st of 16	8	7	0	1	235	191	+44
2004 Slovenia	Main round	7th of 16	7	4	0	3	211	203	+8
2006 Switzerland	did not qualify								
2008 Norway	Match for 5th place	5th of 16	7	4	1	2	208	190	+18
2010 Austria	Preliminary round	15th of 16	3	0	0	3	78	84	−6
2012 Serbia	Main round	12th of 16	6	1	2	3	157	168	−11
2014 Denmark	Main round	7th of 16	6	4	0	2	166	158	+8
2016 Poland	Match for 7th place	8th of 16	7	2	2	3	173	168	+5
2018 Croatia	Runners-up	2nd of 16	8	4	0	4	218	216	+2
2020 Austria/Norway/Sweden	Main round	7th of 24	7	4	0	3	182	169	+13
2022 Hungary/Slovakia	Champions	1st of 24	9	7	1	1	252	221	+31
2024 Germany	Third place	3rd of 24	9	6	0	3	282	255	+27
2026 Denmark/Norway/Sweden	Match for 5th place	6th of 24	8	5	1	2	270	240	+30
2028 Portugal/Spain/Switzerland	To be determined								
2030 Czech Republic/Denmark/Poland	To be determined								
2032 France/ Germany	To be determined								
Total	16/20	5 titles	113	72	7	34	3154	2877	+277

*Denotes draws include knockout matches decided on penalty throws.
**Gold background color indicates that the tournament was won. Red border color indicates tournament was held on home soil.

== Team ==
=== Current squad ===
Roster for the 2026 European Men's Handball Championship.

Head coach: Michael Apelgren

No.	Pos.	Name	Date of birth (age)	Height	App.	Goals	Club
2	LB	Jonathan Carlsbogård	19 April 1995 (age 31)	1.95 m	92	182	(Spain) FC Barcelona
5	P	Max Darj	27 September 1991 (age 34)	1.92 m	134	162	(Germany) Füchse Berlin
6	P	Felix Möller	4 September 2002 (age 23)	1.96 m	37	66	(Denmark) Aalborg Håndbold
11	RW	Daniel Pettersson	6 May 1992 (age 34)	1.79 m	101	228	(Germany) SC Magdeburg
12	GK	Andreas Palicka	10 July 1986 (age 40)	1.89 m	177	19	(Norway) Kolstad Håndball
13	RW	Sebastian Karlsson	21 January 1995 (age 31)	1.78 m	38	111	(France) Paris Saint-Germain
15	LW	Hampus Wanne	10 December 1993 (age 32)	1.85 m	117	468	(Denmark) HØJ Elite
19	CB	Felix Claar	5 January 1997 (age 29)	1.92 m	86	243	(Germany) SC Magdeburg
20	GK	Mikael Appelgren	6 September 1989 (age 36)	1.92 m	103	2	(Hungary) Veszprém KC
23	RB	Albin Lagergren	11 September 1992 (age 33)	1.86 m	133	413	(Germany) SC Magdeburg
24	CB	Jim Gottfridsson	2 September 1992 (age 33)	1.92 m	178	537	(Hungary) SC Pick Szeged
25	LB	Nikola Roganović	27 July 2006 (age 20)	1.99 m	6	12	(Sweden) HK Malmö
27	CB	Axel Månsson	10 May 2005 (age 21)	1.78 m	5	4	(Sweden) IFK Kristianstad
29	RB	Edwin Aspenbäck	8 July 2000 (age 26)	1.96 m	12	4	(Germany) Rhein-Neckar Löwen
32	P	Oscar Bergendahl	8 March 1995 (age 31)	1.92 m	67	105	(Germany) SC Magdeburg
33	RB	Lukas Sandell	3 February 1997 (age 29)	1.91 m	80	212	(Germany) Rhein-Neckar Löwen
42	LB	Eric Johansson	28 June 2000 (age 26)	1.97 m	54	151	(Germany) THW Kiel
43	LW	Felix Montebovi	28 November 2005 (age 20)	1.75 m	4	5	(Sweden) HK Malmö
51	GK	Fabian Norsten	11 July 2000 (age 26)	1.96 m	19	0	(Denmark) Aalborg Håndbold

=== Notable players ===
- Per Carlén
- Björn "Lurch" Andersson
- Bengt Johansson
- Stefan Lövgren
- Mats Olsson
- Staffan Olsson
- Magnus Wislander
- Ljubomir Vranjes
- Pierre Thorsson
- Magnus Andersson
- Ola Lindgren
- Erik Hajas
- Johan Petersson
- Peter Gentzel
- Tomas Svensson
- Kim Andersson
- Martin Frändesjö
- Jim Gottfridsson
- Niclas Ekberg
- Jonas Källman

=== Coaches ===
#	Coaches	Period
1	Herbert Johansson	1938–1948
2	Curt Wadmark	1948–1967
3	Roland Mattsson	1967–1974
4	Bertil Andersén	1974–1979
5	Ingemar Eriksson	1979–1980
6	Caj-Åke Andersson	1980–1982
7	Roger "Ragge" Carlsson	1982–1988
8	Bengt "Bengan" Johansson	1988–2004
9	Ingemar Linnéll	2004–2008
10	Ola Lindgren & Staffan Olsson	2008–2016
11	Kristján Andrésson	2016–2020
12	Glenn Solberg	2020–2024
13	Michael Apelgren	2024–

== World and European records ==
=== World records ===
- Longest undefeated streak in international championships (25 matches, Euro 1998 - 2000 Olympic Games).
- Longest medal round streak in major championships (14 tournaments, 1990–2002).
- Longest medal round streak in the World Championships (7 tournaments, 1986–2001).
- 8 consecutive finals in international championships (1996–2002).
- Most World Championship finals (8 - shared with France).

=== European records ===
- 3 consecutive gold medals at the European championship (1998, 2000, 2002).

== Other merits ==
- First European nation to win a major championship title three times in a row (Euro 1998, Euro 2000, Euro 2002).
- 3 x winners of the World Cup (1992, 1996, 2004)
- 2 x winners of the Supercup (1993, 2005)
- 1 x winners of the Intercontinental Cup (2000)
- The first IHF World Champion (1954 - indoor handball) (Germany's 1938 victory was under the IAHF).
- The first EHF European Champion (1994).
- Defeated Denmark 18–12 in Copenhagen in the first ever international indoor handball game (8 March 1935).

== Kit supplier ==
From 2004 to 2015 Sweden's kits were supplied by Adidas, and 2016–2019 by Kempa. The current supplier is Craft.

== See also ==
- Sweden women's national handball team
