= 1954 World Men's Handball Championship squads =

The 1954 World Men's Handball Championship represented a pivotal moment in the history of the sport, marking the first time the tournament was held indoors and featuring a standardized squad format of 13 players per national team. Held in Sweden, this second edition of the indoor world championships saw six elite nations—Denmark, Czechoslovakia, France, Norway, Switzerland, and the host nation—compete in a high-stakes group stage followed by a knockout final. The rosters showcased the early technical evolution of handball, transitioning from the outdoor 11-a-side game to the faster, more strategic 7-a-side indoor variant. Key figures of the era, such as the legendary Swedish goalkeeper Roland Mattsson and the prolific scoring units of the German and Czechoslovak sides, defined the tactical landscape of the tournament. These squads were not only selected for their physical prowess but also for their ability to adapt to the smaller court dimensions, which necessitated improved ball-handling and rapid transitions between defense and attack.

Appearances, goals and ages as of tournament start, 13 January 1954.

== Group B ==
=== France ===
Head coach: René Ricard and Raymond Hoinant

Players

No.	Pos.	Name	Date of birth (age)	Height	App.	Goals	Club
		Jacques Pluen					(France) FC Sochaux
		Jean Robart					(France) AS Police Paris
		Claude Sagna	15 February 1930 (aged 23)	1.75m			(France) AS Police Paris
		Michel Pichot					(France) AS Police Paris
		Félix Gaonac'h					(France) AS Police Paris
		Marcel Gaudion	12 February 1924 (aged 29)	1.86m			(France) Villemomble Sports
		Maurice Chastanier	27 June 1931 (aged 22)				(France) Villemomble Sports
		Jean Lasnier					(France) CSL Dijon
		Bernard Santona	10 November 1921 (aged 32)				(France) CSL Dijon
		Pierre Imberty					(France) Paris Université Club
		Jean Goupy					(France) Paris Université Club
		Raymond Quaglia					(France) Cheminots Paris
		Pierre Grenier					(France) Cheminots Paris

=== Switzerland ===
Head coach: (Switzerland) Karl Schmid; President of HBA: (Switzerland) Albert Wagner

Players

No.	Pos.	Name	Date of birth (age)	Height	App.	Goals	Club
	GK	Karl Masiero	6 October 1928 (aged 25)		1	0	(Switzerland) STV Rorschach-Stadt
	GK	Alex Mundwyler	1928 (aged 25–26)		3	0	(Switzerland) BSC Young Boys
	D	Kurt Hartmann	14 July 1928 (aged 25)		2	5	(Switzerland) TV Unterstrass Zürich
	D	Ernst Dubs	1 August 1924 (aged 29)		1	0	(Switzerland) Grasshopper Club Zürich
	D	Otto Schwarz	29 May 1928 (aged 25)		7	7	(Switzerland) Grasshopper Club Zürich
	D	Jenny Walter	1924 (aged 29–30)		1	0	(Switzerland) TV Unterstrass Zürich
	D	Walter Strohmeier	22 June 1930 (aged 23)		3	4	(Switzerland) Grasshopper Club Zürich
	D	Hugo Baumgartner	1925 (aged 28–29)		2	1	(Switzerland) TV Kaufleute Zürich
	O	Hansjakob Bertschinger	9 June 1923 (aged 30)		7	7	(Switzerland) Grasshopper Club Zürich
	O	Roger Buschor	1928 (aged 25–26)		5	6	(Switzerland) Grasshopper Club Zürich
	O	Erhard Minder	16 January 1925 (aged 28)	1.83m	0	0	(Switzerland) Pfadi Winterthur
	O	Romeo Brianza	21 August 1930 (aged 23)		1	1	(Switzerland) TV Kaufleute Basel
	O	Fritz Riess	1932 (aged 21–22)		1	2	(Switzerland) TV Kaufleute Basel

- GK=Goalkeeper; D=Defender; O=Offendner
- Apps. and Goals:

=== West Germany ===
Head coach: (West Germany) Fritz Fromm

Players

No.	Pos.	Name	Date of birth (age)	Height	App.	Goals	Club
	GK	Harry Kamm	20 August 1922 (aged 31)		0	0	(West Germany) Polizei SV Berlin
	GK	Fredy Pankonin	27 February 1927 (aged 26)		3	0	(West Germany) Füchse Berlin Reinickendorf
		Markus Bernhard	13 February 1921 (aged 32)		3	4	(West Germany) FC Bayern München
		Heinrich Dahlinger	30 October 1922 (aged 31)		9	21	(West Germany) THW Kiel
		Adolf Giele	17 December 1929 (aged 24)		4	3	(West Germany) SC Victoria Hamburg
		Karl Hebel	13 May 1923 (aged 30)		3	5	(West Germany) Polizei SV Hamburg
		Horst Käsler	18 April 1926 (aged 27)		5	7	(West Germany) Berliner SV 1892
		Bernhard Kempa	19 November 1920 (aged 33)		4	3	(West Germany) Frisch Auf Göppingen
		Otto Maychrzak	6 March 1927 (aged 26)	1.92m	7	27	(West Germany) Polizei SV Hamburg
		Herbert Podolske	20 July 1919 (aged 34)		4	4	(West Germany) THW Kiel
		Wolfgang Schütze	19 June 1927 (aged 26)		10	22	(West Germany) Berliner SV 1892
		Hinrich Schwenker	8 July 1934 (aged 19)		1	0	(West Germany) ATSV Habenhausen
		Werner Vick	3 December 1920 (aged 33)		8	4	(West Germany) Polizei SV Hamburg
