= Joachim Stenbäcken =

Swedish handball player (born 1963)

Joachim Stenbäcken (pronounced [ˈjûːakɪm ˈstêːnˌbɛkːɛn]; born 26 May 1963) is a Swedish former handball player who played as a pivot. He was born and raised in Vårgårda and made his senior debut for Vårgårda IK in the 1978–79 season. He later moved to Alingsås HK before signing for top division club IFK Karlskrona in 1982. In his first season with the club they reached the final of the IHF Cup, where they were defeated by Soviet club ZTR Zaporizhia. He scored more than 400 goals in his five seasons for Karlskrona. In 1987 he left the club and joined second division club SoIK Hellas, where he played for two seasons. In 1989 he signed for IFK Kristianstad and helped them to promotion back to the top division in his first season. They were relegated after one season but were promoted again a year later. He left the club in 1995 and signed for league rivals Stavstens IF. He later returned to Hellas before rejoining Kristianstad, who were now playing in lower divisions, in 1998. He continued to play for the club until he retired in 2004. He played 340 matches for Kristianstad and scored 1350 goals for the club, the second most behind Bo Ahlberg. In total he scored 2400 goals in his career.

He played 55 matches for the Swedish national team between 1983 and 1987. He was a member of the team that finished fourth in the 1986 World Championship.

After his handball career he became a journalist for Kvällsposten writing about harness racing, having long been a follower of the sport. He later studied psychology, having been interested in the psychological factors of handball during his playing career. In 2014–15 he was mental coach for HIF Karlskrona, helping the team to reach promotion to the top division. In 2017 he joined Kristianstad HK in the same position, reuniting with former HIF Karlskrona coach Ulf Schefvert.

His nephew is handball player Jonathan Stenbäcken.
