= Kjeldgaard =

Kjeldgaard is a surname. Notable people with the surname include:

- Brock Kjeldgaard (born 1986), Canadian baseball player
- Claus Kjeldgaard (born 1986), Danish handballer
- Jacob Kjeldgaard (1884–1964), Danish photographer and journalist

== See also ==
- Nadia Kjældgaard (born 1978), Danish soccer player
