= 1954 World Men's Handball Championship – qualification =

Handball championship qualification round

Qualification matches for the 1954 World Men's Handball Championship took place in 1953.

== Games ==
28 November 1953	West Germany	21–10	Finland	Neumünster; Attendance: 4500; Referees: Carl Kling (SWE)
28 November 1953	Maychrzak 8	(7–6)	Weckstroem 6	Neumünster; Attendance: 4500; Referees: Carl Kling (SWE)

6 December 1953; 20:00	Czechoslovakia	13–8	Hungary	Stadium of Riegrovy sady, Prague; Attendance: >1000; Referees: Alfred Schwab (AUT)
6 December 1953; 20:00	Ruža 7	(9–3)	Kesjár 4	Stadium of Riegrovy sady, Prague; Attendance: >1000; Referees: Alfred Schwab (AUT)

9 December 1953	Norway	11–26	Denmark	Bygdøyhus, Oslo; Referees: Blomqvist (SWE)
9 December 1953	Hagen 3	(6–15)	Theilmann 7	Bygdøyhus, Oslo; Referees: Blomqvist (SWE)
9 December 1953		Report Denmark; Report Norway		Bygdøyhus, Oslo; Referees: Blomqvist (SWE)

12 December 1953	Switzerland	15–11	Austria	Olmahalle, St. Gallen; Attendance: 3,500; Referees: Karl Jung (BRD)
12 December 1953	Hartmann 4	(7–7)	Steffelbauer 6	Olmahalle, St. Gallen; Attendance: 3,500; Referees: Karl Jung (BRD)
12 December 1953		Report Switzerland		Olmahalle, St. Gallen; Attendance: 3,500; Referees: Karl Jung (BRD)

13 December 1953	France	23–11	Spain	Nantes; Referees: Walter Maurer (SUI)
13 December 1953	Gaudion 7	(9–3)	Suzi 4	Nantes; Referees: Walter Maurer (SUI)
