= Johan Jepson =

Swedish handball player (born 1985)

Personal information
- Nationality: Swedish
- Born: 15 July 1985 (age 41) Karlshamn, Sweden
- Height: 1.82 m (6 ft 0 in)

Sport
- Sport: Handball
- Position: Left wing

Senior clubs
- Years: Team
- –2004: Karlshamns HF
- 2004–2006: IFK Karlskrona
- 2006–2016: IFK Kristianstad
- 2017: New York Athletic Club

Johan Jepson (pronounced [ˈjûːan ˈjɛ̌psɔn]; born 15 July 1985) is a Swedish former handball player who primarily played as a left winger.

== Career ==
He started his career at his hometown club Karlshamns HF before moving to second-tier club IFK Karlskrona in 2004. Two years later he signed for league rivals IFK Kristianstad. He helped the team achieve promotion to the top division, at the time known as Elitserien, in 2009. After battling relegation in 2009–10 and 2010–11, he helped the team reach the Swedish Championship final in 2012, where they were beaten by Sävehof. He was named club captain in 2012, when previous captain Pär Möllerberg left the club. Jepson helped Kristianstad reach another final in the following season, but they lost again, this time to Drott. He captained the team to two consecutive Swedish Championships in 2015 and 2016, before retiring after the second title. He played over 350 competitive matches for the club, more than any other player, and scored more than 400 goals. He made a brief comeback in October 2017 to play for American team New York Athletic Club in the Michael Lipov Memorial Cup.

== Player profile ==
A versatile player, Jepson played as a backcourt player for Karlshamn but later played primarily as a left winger. His energetic and uncompromising playing style made him highly popular among Kristianstad fans, and in 2016 he became the first player in the club's history to be honoured with a testimonial. In his last season at Kristianstad, Jepson chose to wear a rainbow-coloured captain's armband, a practice that was continued by successor Ólafur Guðmundsson.

== Outside handball ==
After his playing career, Jepson left handball and started working as a production manager. He married Ann Distner in 2012, and they have two children.
