= 1954 World Men's Handball Championship =

Tournament details
- Host country: Sweden
- Venue(s): 7 (in 7 host cities)
- Dates: 13–17 January
- Teams: 6 (from 1 confederation)

Final positions
- Champions: Sweden (1st title)
- Runner-up: West Germany
- Third place: Czechoslovakia

Tournament statistics
- Matches played: 9
- Goals scored: 274 (30.44 per match)
- Top scorer(s): (West Germany) Otto Maychrzak 16

Awards
- Best player: (West Germany) Bernhard Kempa

The 1954 World Men's Handball Championship was the second indoor handball world championship. It was held in Sweden from 13–17 January 1954, and the hosts also won the championship.

It was the first world championship governed by the International Handball Federation, after the first one was governed by the International Amateur Handball Federation (IAHF).

== Qualification ==
Competition	Dates	Vacancies	Qualified
Host nation		1	Sweden
Qualification	28 November – 13 December 1953	5	Czechoslovakia; Denmark; France; West Germany; Switzerland

== Results ==
=== Group A ===
Team	Pld	W	D	L	GF	GA	GR	Pts
Sweden	2	2	0	0	39	22	1.773	4
Czechoslovakia	2	1	0	1	32	36	0.889	2
Denmark	2	0	0	2	21	34	0.618	0

13 January 1954	Sweden	16–8	Denmark	Mässhallen, Gothenburg; Attendance: 4200
13 January 1954	Stockenberg 6	(7–5)	Madsen & Theilmann each 2	Mässhallen, Gothenburg; Attendance: 4200
13 January 1954		Report Denmark		Mässhallen, Gothenburg; Attendance: 4200

14 January 1954	Czechoslovakia	18–13	Denmark	Jönköping
14 January 1954		(9–8)	Theilmann 4	Jönköping
14 January 1954		Report Denmark		Jönköping

14 January 1954	Sweden	23–14	Czechoslovakia	Idrottshallen, Örebro; Attendance: 2000
14 January 1954	Almqvist 4	(10–6)		Idrottshallen, Örebro; Attendance: 2000

=== Group B ===
Team	Pld	W	D	L	GF	GA	GR	Pts
West Germany	2	2	0	0	47	13	3.615	4
Switzerland	2	0	1	1	20	31	0.645	1
France	2	0	1	1	15	38	0.395	1

13 January 1954	West Germany	27–4	France	Sporthallen, Kristianstad; Attendance: 1925
13 January 1954	Maychrzak 7	(12–1)		Sporthallen, Kristianstad; Attendance: 1925

14 January 1954	France	11–11	Switzerland	Malmö; Attendance: 1200; Referees: Sohre (BRD)
14 January 1954	3 players each 3	(2–3)	Bertschinger 6	Malmö; Attendance: 1200; Referees: Sohre (BRD)
14 January 1954		Report Switzerland		Malmö; Attendance: 1200; Referees: Sohre (BRD)

15 January 1954	West Germany	20–9	Switzerland	Idrottshallen, Lund; Attendance: 2000; Referees: Kling (SWE)
15 January 1954	Maychrzak 6	(11–4)	Bertschinger 3	Idrottshallen, Lund; Attendance: 2000; Referees: Kling (SWE)
15 January 1954		Report Switzerland		Idrottshallen, Lund; Attendance: 2000; Referees: Kling (SWE)

== Finals ==
=== 5th–6th-place match ===
16 January 1954	Denmark	23–11	France	Växjö
16 January 1954	Theilmann 10	(9–3)	Pichot 4	Växjö
16 January 1954		Report Denmark		Växjö

=== Bronze-medal match ===
17 January 1954	Czechoslovakia	24–11	Switzerland	Frölundaborg, Gothenburg; Attendance: 5500
17 January 1954		(13–3)	Bertschinger 3	Frölundaborg, Gothenburg; Attendance: 5500
17 January 1954		Report Switzerland		Frölundaborg, Gothenburg; Attendance: 5500

=== Final match ===
17 January 1954	Sweden	17–14	West Germany	Mässhallen, Gothenburg; Attendance: 5500
17 January 1954	Almqvist 5	(8–5)	3 players each 3	Mässhallen, Gothenburg; Attendance: 5500

== Final standings ==
Rank	Team
Gold medal	Sweden
Silver medal	West Germany
Bronze medal	Czechoslovakia
4	Switzerland
5	Denmark
6	France

== Medalists ==
Gold	Silver	Bronze
Sweden Gunnar Brusberg; Roland Mattsson; Sten Åkerstedt; Rolf Almqvist; Kjell Jönsson; Per-Olof Larsson; Rune Lindqvist; Åke Moberg; Hans Olsson; Bertil Rönndahl; Ewerth Sjunnesson; Carl-Erik Stockenberg; Rolf Zachrisson	West Germany Harry Kamm; Fredi Pankonin; Markus Bernhard; Heinrich Dahlinger; Adolf Giele; Karl Hebel; Horst Käsler; Bernhard Kempa; Otto Maychrzak; Herbert Podolske; Wolfgang Schütze; Hinrich Schwenker; Werner Vick	Czechoslovakia Miloš Bačák; Miroslav Baumruk; Karel Čermák; Jiří Klemm; Jiří Korbel; Bedřich König; Alois Navrátil; Vladimír Nykl; Zdeněk Pešl; Dušan Ruža; Oldřich Spáčil; Josef Trojan; Jiří Vícha
Curt Wadmark (Coach)	Fritz Fromm (Coach)	Jan Voreth (Coach)
