= Jonathan Stenbäcken =

Swedish handball player (born 1988)

Personal information
- Nationality: Swedish
- Born: 7 January 1988 (age 38) Vårgårda, Sweden
- Height: 1.95 m (6 ft 5 in)

Sport
- Sport: Handball
- Position: Left back

Senior clubs
- Years: Team
- 2006–2011: IK Sävehof
- 2011–2012: Füchse Berlin
- 2012–2014: MT Melsungen
- 2014–2015: IFK Kristianstad
- 2015–2017: TBV Lemgo
- 2017–2021: Skjern Håndbold
- 2021–2022: IK Sävehof
National team
Years	Team	Apps	(Gls)
2008–2017	Sweden	49	(51)

Jonathan Stenbäcken (born 7 January 1988) is a Swedish former handball player, who last played for IK Sävehof and the Swedish national team. Since 2022 he is Sports Manager for IK Sävehof.

He participated on the Sweden men's national handball team at the 2016 Summer Olympics in Rio de Janeiro, in the men's handball tournament.

His uncle is former handball player Joachim Stenbäcken.
