= Fernand de Brinon =

French lawyer and journalist (1885–1947)

Fernand de Brinon, Marquis de Brinon
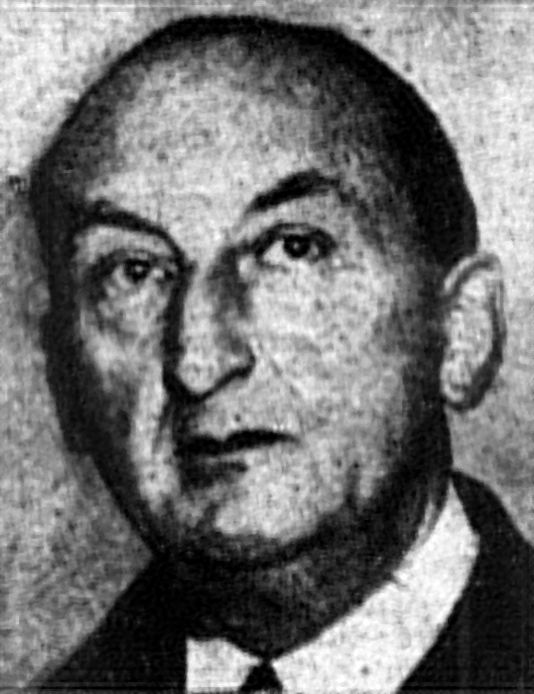
- Born: 26 August 1885; Libourne, French Third Republic
- Died: 15 April 1947 (aged 61); Fort de Montrouge, Paris, French Fourth Republic
- Occupation: Politician
- Awards: Knight of the Légion d'Honneur
- Status: Executed by firing squad
- Convictions: Treason; War crimes
- Penalty: Death

Fernand de Brinon, Marquis de Brinon (French pronunciation: [fɛʁnɑ̃ də bʁinɔ̃]; 26 August 1885 – 15 April 1947) was a French lawyer and journalist who was one of the architects of French collaboration with the Nazis during World War II. He claimed to have had five private talks with Adolf Hitler between 1933 and 1937.

In 1933, when there were calls in France for a preventive war to put an end to the Nazi regime while Germany was still more-or-less disarmed, Hitler met with de Brinon, who wrote for the newspaper Le Matin. During the meeting, Hitler stressed what he claimed to be his love of peace and his friendship toward France. Hitler's meeting with de Brinon had a huge effect on French public opinion and helped to put an end to the calls for a preventive war. It convinced many in France that Hitler was a man of peace.

Brinon was a high official of the collaborationist Vichy regime. During the liberation of France in 1944, remnants of the Vichy leadership fled into exile, where de Brinon was selected as president of the rump government in exile. After the war was over, he was tried in France for war crimes, found guilty, sentenced to death, and executed.

== Early life and marriage ==
Born into a wealthy noble family in the city of Libourne in the Gironde département, Fernand de Brinon studied political science and law at university but chose to work as a journalist in Paris. After the First World War, he advocated a rapprochement with Germany. He became friends with Joachim von Ribbentrop.

De Brinon married Jeanne Louise Rachel Franck, the Jewish former wife of Claude Ullmann, and cousin of Emmanuel Berl. She converted to Roman Catholicism.

== 1930s Paris ==
The de Brinons became leading socialites in 1930s Paris, and close friends of the political right-wing elite and of socialist leader Édouard Daladier. In co-ordination with Ribbentrop's personal representative in Paris, Otto Abetz, de Brinon headed the France–Germany Committee, which was designed to influence France's political and cultural establishment in a pro-German direction. That was Nazi Germany's main propaganda technique in its attempt to influence French politics before the Second World War. During the Munich Crisis, Brinon sent accounts of the discussions of the French Cabinet that were obtained from two ministers to the German government.

== Occupied Paris ==
A leading advocate for collaboration following France's defeat by Germany in the Second World War, in July 1940, de Brinon was invited by Pierre Laval, Vice-Premier of the new Vichy regime, to act as its representative to the German High Command in occupied Paris. De Brinon's seat was the confiscated Hôtel de Breteuil in Paris (12 avenue Foch). De Brinon benefited from his long acquaintance with the German ambassador Otto Abetz. In September 1940, he also established the Groupe Collaboration to help establish closer cultural ties between Germany and France. In 1942, Philippe Pétain, head of the Vichy regime, gave him the title of Secretary of State.

As the third-ranking member of the Vichy regime and because of his enthusiastic support for the fascist cause, de Brinon's importance to the Nazis was such that he was able to obtain a special pass for his Jewish-born wife that exempted her from deportation to a German concentration camp.

== Katyn Massacre ==
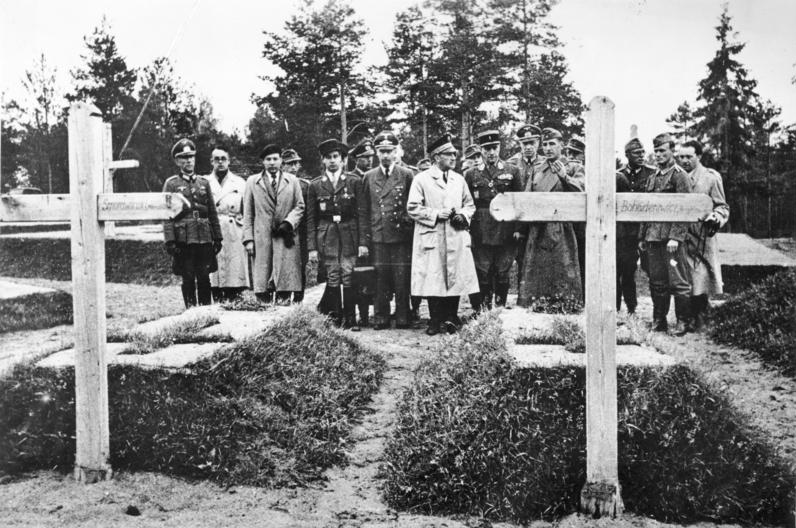
Fernand de Brinon (center) visiting the Katyn exhumation, April 1943.

De Brinon was invited by the German supreme general staff to the Eastern Front, as president of the committee of the Legion of French Volunteers against Bolschevism (LVF), to visit the exhumation of the bodies of the Polish victims in the Katyn forest in April 1943.

== Vichy government in exile ==
In the face of the Allied invasion of France in June 1944, the remnants of the Vichy regime fled to Sigmaringen, Germany, in September 1944, where the Germans set up the French Governmental Commission for the Defense of National Interests as a government in exile.

The Germans wished to project a facade of legality for the commission, and enlisted de Brinon to serve as president, and other Vichy officials, including Joseph Darnand, Jean Luchaire, Eugène Bridoux, and Marcel Déat as members.

== Arrest and trial ==
De Brinon was eventually arrested by the advancing Allied troops. He and his wife were both held in Fresnes prison, but she was eventually released. De Brinon was tried in the épuration légale by the French Court of Justice for war crimes, found guilty and sentenced to death on 6 March 1947. He was executed by firing squad on 15 April at the military fort in the Paris suburb of Montrouge.

In 2002, French historian Gilbert Joseph published Fernand de Brinon : L'Aristocrate de la collaboration. In 2004, Bernard Ullmann, Lisette de Brinon's son from her first marriage, broke his 60-year silence and told his family's story in his book, Lisette de Brinon, Ma Mère.

== Works cited ==
- Aron, Robert (1962). "Pétain : sa carrière, son procès" [Pétain: his career, his trial]. Grands dossiers de l'histoire contemporaine [Major issues in contemporary history] (in French). Paris: Librairie Académique Perrin. OCLC 1356008.
- Mauthner, Martin: Otto Abetz and His Paris Acolytes - French Writers Who Flirted with Fascism, 1930–1945. Liverpool University Press, 2016, ISBN 978-1-84519-784-1
- Rousso, Henry (1999). Pétain et la fin de la collaboration : Sigmaringen, 1944-1945 [Pétain and the end of collaboration: Sigmaringen, 1944-1945] (in French). Paris: Éditions Complexe. ISBN 2-87027-138-7.
- Bloch, Michael. Ribbentrop. New York: Crown Publishing, 1992. ISBN 0-517-59310-6.
