= Sten Olsson =

Swedish handball player (1944-2008)

Personal information
- Nationality: Swedish
- Born: 8 February 1944 Kristianstad, Sweden
- Died: March 7, 2008 (aged 64) Kristianstad, Sweden

Sport
- Sport: Handball
- Position: Goalkeeper

Youth career
- Years: Team
- –1963: Kristianstad BI

Senior clubs
- Years: Team
- 1963–1978: IFK Kristianstad
- 1965–1966: → HK Drott (loan)
National team
Years	Team	Apps	(Gls)
1965–1973	Sweden	34	(0)

Sten Olsson (8 February 1944 - 7 March 2008) was a Swedish handball goalkeeper, who competed in the 1972 Summer Olympics and at the 1967 World Men's Handball Championship.

In 1972 he was part of the Swedish team which finished seventh in the Olympic tournament. He played three matches.

At club level he played for IFK Kristianstad his entire career, except for a one-year loan to HK Drott in 1965-66. In addition to handball, he also played association football.
