= Marianne (magazine, 1932–1940) =

Illustrated French magazine (1932–1940)

- Chief editor and Director: Emmanuel Berl
- Editor: Pierre Bost
- Director: Lucien Vogel
- Aviator and Author: Antoine de Saint-Exupéry
- Staff writers: Raymond Patenôtre; André Cornu; Léon Werth
- Photographer: Jacob Kjeldgaard
- Categories: Literary, Political, Cultural
- Frequency: Weekly
- Circulation: 60,000
- Publisher: Gaston Gallimard
- First issue: October 26, 1932; 94 years ago
- Final issue: August 28, 1940; 86 years ago
- Company: ZED
- Country: France
- Based in: Paris
- Language: French
- ISSN: 1256-0367

Marianne (French pronunciation: [maʁjan]) was a weekly Paris-based French illustrated magazine that appeared in France, between 1932 and 1940. It was named after the personification of France and Liberty, Marianne.

== History ==
Marianne was founded on 26 October 1932 by Gaston Gallimard and edited under director Emmanuel Berl, until 1937. It began being published under the umbrella corporation ZED, which had been established in 1928. The magazine was sold in January 1937, to Raymond Patenôtre and relaunched by André Cornu in 1938. It described itself as the Grand hebdomadaire littéraire illustré ("Great illustrated literary weekly").

Marianne was said to be a 'Paris Liberal Weekly' publication, and a "weekly of French interests and ideas."

When it was relaunched in 1938, Patenôtre let it remain politically slightly left of centre. Among the notable contributors was Léon Werth, who regularly contributed to the magazine.

Marianne was noted also for its anti-Nazi illustrations between 1938 and 1940, including by Jacob Kjeldgaard, Danish journalist photographer. Publication of Marianne was suspended by the Nazi-collaborating Vichy France regime on 4 September 1940. The Vichy France regime had already begun censoring portions of it, at least from 14 August of that year.

== See also ==
- Marianne (magazine)
