= Emil Frend Öfors =

Swedish handball player (born 1994)

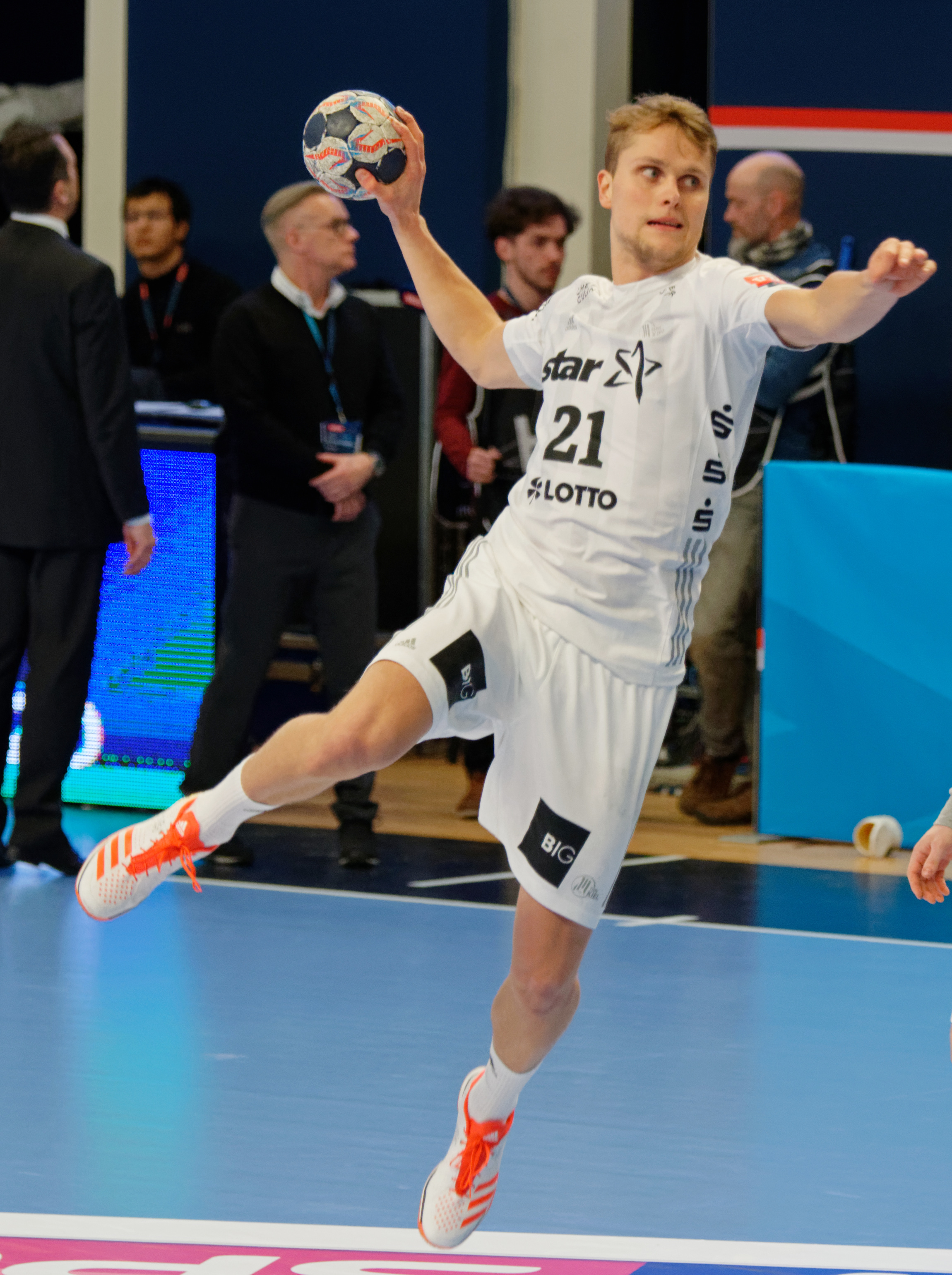
- Emil Frend Öfors playing for THW Kiel against Paris Saint-Germain HB in March 2018

Personal information
- Nationality: Swedish
- Born: 13 September 1994 (age 32) Stockholm, Sweden
- Height: 1.93 m (6 ft 4 in)

Sport
- Sport: Handball
- Position: Left wing
- Current club: IFK Kristianstad
- Number: 20

Senior clubs
- Years: Team
- –2014: IFK Tumba
- 2014–2017: Alingsås HK
- 2017–2018: THW Kiel
- 2018–2020: HSG Wetzlar
- 2020–: IFK Kristianstad
National team
Years	Team	Apps	(Gls)
2017–	Sweden	14	(21)

Emil Frend Öfors (born 13 September 1994) is a Swedish handball player for IFK Kristianstad and the Swedish national team.

He participated at the 2017 World Men's Handball Championship.
