= Germany's Sports Hall of Fame =

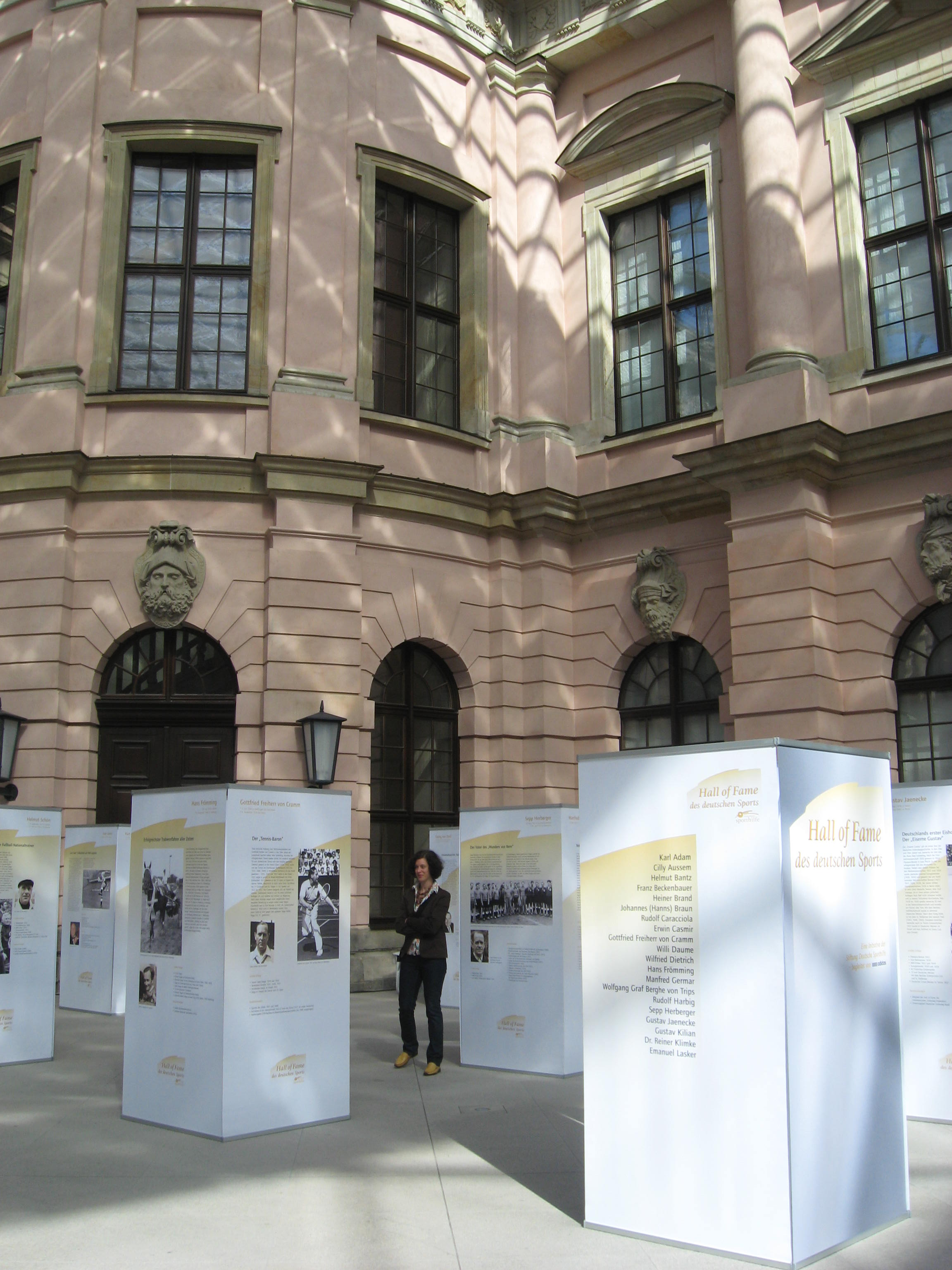
Opening of the Germany's Sports Hall of Fame at the Deutsches Historisches Museum in Berlin.

The Germany's Sports Hall of Fame (German: Hall of Fame des deutschen Sports) is the national sports hall of fame in Germany, initiated 2006. The inductions are made by Stiftung Deutsche Sporthilfe, Deutscher Olympischer Sportbund and Verband Deutscher Sportjournalisten.

== Members ==
Member	Sport	Inducted
Karl Adam (1912–1976)	Rowing	2008
Dirk Nowitzki (born 1978)	Basketball	2025
Philipp Lahm (born 1983)	Football	2025
Hans-Georg Aschenbach (born 1951)	Ski jumping	2015
Cilly Aussem (1909–1963)	Tennis	2008
Helmut Bantz (1921–2004)	Gymnastics	2008
Hans-Jürgen Bäumler (born 1942)	Figure skating	2011
Franz Beckenbauer (1945–2024)	Football	2006
Boris Becker (born 1967)	Tennis	2015
Berthold Beitz (1913–2013)	Organizer	2008
Wolfgang Graf Berghe von Trips (1928–1961)	Motorsport	2008
Gretel Bergmann (1914-2017)	Athletics	2012
Willy Bogner (born 1941)	Alpine skiing	2013
Heiner Brand (born 1952)	Handball	2007
Hanns Braun (1886–1918)	Athletics	2008
Martin Braxenthaler (born 1972)	Alpine skiing	2019
Hugo Budinger (1927-2017)	Field hockey	2011
Karin Büttner-Janz (born 1952)	Gymnastics	2011
Rudolf Caracciola (1901–1959)	Motorsport	2008
Erwin Casmir (1895–1982)	Fencing	2008
Gottfried von Cramm (1909–1976)	Tennis	2008
Willi Daume (1913–1996)	Handball	2006
Joachim Deckarm (born 1954)	Handball	2013
Wilfried Dietrich (1933–1992)	Wrestling	2008
Andreas Dittmer (born 1972)	Canoeing	2018
Heike Drechsler (born 1964)	Athletics	2017
Heide Ecker-Rosendahl (born 1947)	Athletics	2011
Anja Fichtel (born 1968)	Fencing	2015
Birgit Fischer (born 1962)	Canoeing	2008
Johannes Frömming (1910–1996)	Harness racing	2008
Heinz Fütterer (1931-2019)	Athletics	2011
Hartwig Gauder (born 1954)	Athletics	2016
Willibald Gebhardt (1831–1921)	Organizer	2014
Manfred Germar (born 1935)	Athletics	2006
Eberhard Gienger (born 1951)	Gymnastics	2016
Steffi Graf (born 1969)	Tennis	2008
Michael Groß (born 1964)	Swimming	2015
Ludwig Guttmann (1899–1980)	Organizer	2014
Cornelia Hanisch (born 1952)	Fencing	2016
Sven Hannawald (born 1974)	Ski jumping	2017
Rudolf Harbig (1913–1944)	Athletics	2008
Antje Harvey (born 1967)	Nordic skiing, biathlon	2012
Armin Hary (born 1937)	Athletics	2011
Sepp Herberger (1897–1977)	Football	2008
Willi Holdorf (1940-2020)	Athletics	2011
Gustav Jaenecke (1908–1985)	Ice hockey	2008
Friedrich Ludwig Jahn (1778–1852)	Gymnastics	2013
Erhard Keller (born 1944)	Speed skating	2011
Franz Keller (born 1945)	Nordic combined	2017
Bernhard Kempa (1920-2017)	Handball	2011
Gustav Kilian (1907–2000)	Cycling	2008
Marika Kilius (born 1943)	Figure skating	2011
Reiner Klimke (1936–1999)	Dressage	2008
Peter-Michael Kolbe (born 1953)	Rowing	2016
Ingrid Krämer-Gulbin (born 1943)	Diving	2011
Erich Kühnhackl (born 1950)	Ice hockey	2016
Willy Kuhweide (born 1943)	Sailing	2011
Bernhard Langer (born 1957)	Golf	2016
Emanuel Lasker (1868–1941)	Chess	2008
Martin Lauer (born 1937)	Athletics	2011
Hans Lenk (born 1935)	Rowing	2012
Wolfgang Lötzsch (born 1952)	Cycling	2012
Joachim Löw (born 1960)	Football	2015
Sepp Maier (born 1944)	Football	2014
Henry Maske (born 1964)	Boxing	2012
Lothar Matthäus (born 1961)	Football	2017
Roland Matthes (1950-2019)	Swimming	2006
Ingrid Mickler-Becker (born 1942)	Athletics	2006
Henner Misersky (born 1940)	Nordic skiing	2012
Rosi Mittermaier (1950–2023)	Alpine skiing	2006
Gerd Müller (1945-2021)	Football	2014
Ulrike Nasse-Meyfarth (born 1956)	Athletics	2011
Josef Neckermann (1912–1992)	Dressage	2006
Meinhard Nehmer (born 1941)	Bobsled	2016
Günter Netzer (born 1944)	Football	2016
Magdalena Neuner (born 1987)	Biathlon	2017
Christian Neureuther (born 1949)	Alpine skiing	2017
Gunda Niemann-Stirnemann (born 1966)	Speed skating	2019
Alexander Pusch (born 1955)	Fencing	2016
Erich Rademacher (1901–1979)	Swimming	2008
Helmut Recknagel (born 1937)	Ski jumping	2011
Albert Richter (1912–1940)	Cycling	2008
Kristina Richter (born 1946)	Handball	2016
Walter Röhrl (born 1947)	Motorsports	2016
Gustav Schäfer (1906–1991)	Rowing	2008
Max Schmeling (1905–2005)	Boxing	2008
Harald Schmid (born 1957)	Athletics	2016
Arnd Schmitt (born 1965)	Fencing	2016
Alwin Schockemöhle (born 1937)	Show jumping	2016
Eberhard Schöler (born 1940)	Table tennis	2011
Helmut Schön (1915–1996)	Football	2008
Gerd Schönfelder (born 1970)	Alpine skiing	2018
Carl Schuhmann (1869–1946)	Gymnastics, wrestling	2008
Michael Schumacher (born 1969)	Motorsports	2017
Jochen Schümann (born 1954)	Sailing	2014
Alfred Schwarzmann (1912–2000)	Gymnastics	2008
Werner Seelenbinder (1904–1944)	Wrestling	2008
Uwe Seeler (1936-2022)	Football	2006
Katja Seizinger (born 1972)	Alpine skiing	2018
Renate Stecher (born 1950)	Athletics	2011
Klaus Steinbach (born 1953)	Swimming	2018
Michael Stich (born 1968)	Tennis	2015
Kurt Stöpel (1908–1997)	Cycling	2008
Heinrich Stuhlfauth (1896–1966)	Football	2008
Fritz Thiedemann (1918–2000)	Show jumping	2008
Georg Thoma (born 1937)	Nordic combined	2011
Bert Trautmann (1923-2013)	Football	2011
Walther Tröger (1929-2020)	Organizer	2019
Harry Valérien (1923–2012)	Journalist	2013
Franziska van Almsick (born 1978)	Swimming	2019
Georg von Opel (1912–1971)	Rowing	2008
Fritz Walter (1920–2002)	Football	2008
Liesel Westermann-Krieg (born 1944)	Athletics	2011
Willi Weyer (1917–1987)	Swimming	2008
Frank Wieneke (born 1962)	Judo	2016
Hans Günter Winkler (1926–2018)	Show jumping	2006
Katarina Witt (born 1965)	Figure skating	2010
Klaus Wolfermann (born 1946)	Athletics	2011
Erhard Wunderlich (1956–2012)	Handball	2016

Uli Hoeneß (Football) was introduced in 2009, but had to resign after he was sentenced to a imprisonment for tax evasion in 2014.

== Controversy ==
Germany's Sports Hall of Fame caused a lot of criticism since five former Nazi Party members were included. It was even called a “Hall of Shame”. Nazi Party members include football manager Sepp Herberger, Olympic riding champion Josef Neckermann, former IOC member Willi Daume, cyclist Gustav Kilian and middle distance runner Rudolf Harbig.

The Hall of Fame also includes two victims of the Nazis, cyclist Albert Richter who was murdered by Gestapo in 1939 and wrestler Werner Seelenbinder who was executed in 1944.
