= Carl-Erik Stockenberg =

Swedish handball player (1925-1985)

Carl-Erik Stockenberg (pronounced [kɑːɭˈêːrɪk ˈstɔ̂kːɛnˌbærj]; 11 June 1925 in Nørre Åsum, Kristianstad – 30 June 1985 in Eskiltuna) was a Swedish handball player, who played as a back player. He was a prolific goalscorer and also skilled at blocking shots from opponents. '

He was a Swedish champion with IFK Kristianstad three times1948, 1952 and 1953. Stockenberg was the top scorer of Allsvenskan five years in a row from 1949–50 to 1953–54. In total he played 184 matches and scored 720 goals in Allsvenskan for Kristianstad. In 1956 he joined league rivals IFK Borås, where he played for a single season, playing 18 matches and scoring 71 goals. In 1957 he signed for Guif, where he played until 1967. The team played in Allsvenskan for six of Stockenberg's ten seasons at the club. In these six seasons, he played 85 matches and scored 380 goals. In total, he scored 1171 goals in the top division, making him the first player to score 1000 goals in the league.

He also played 59 matches for Sweden, winning first 1948 IHF World Men's Outdoor Handball Championship and after that World Championship in 1954. He played all three matches and scored 10 goals, making him the highest scoring Swedish player in the tournament.
