= Claus Kjeldgaard =

Danish handball player (born 1986)

Personal information
- Nationality: Danish
- Born: 1 January 1986 (age 40) Mors, Denmark
- Height: 1.89 m (6 ft 2 in)

Sport
- Sport: Handball
- Position: Centre back

Youth career
- Years: Team
- 2004–2005: Aalborg Håndbold

Senior clubs
- Years: Team
- 2005–2007: Aalborg Håndbold
- 2005–2006: → HF Mors (loan)
- 2007: → HF Mors (loan)
- 2007–2009: Mors-Thy Håndbold
- 2009–2013: IFK Kristianstad
- 2013–2018: SønderjyskE Håndbold

Claus Kjeldgaard (born 1 January 1986) is a Danish former handball player who played as a centre back.

He made his senior debut for Aalborg Håndbold in 2005 but was loaned out to HF Mors in September of the same year. He returned to Aalborg for the start of the 2006–07 season, but was again loaned out to Mors in January 2007. He signed permanently for Mors at the end of the season when his contract with Aalborg expired. He signed for Swedish club IFK Kristianstad in 2009. After battling relegation in 2009–10 and 2010–11, he helped his team reach the Swedish Championship final in 2011–12 and 2012–13. However, his team lost both finals. During his time at Kristianstad he often only played in defence due to persistent injury troubles. He returned to his home country in 2013 as he signed for SønderjyskE Håndbold. He retired at the end of the 2017–18 season.
