= Markus Olsson =

Swedish handball player (born 1990)

Personal information
- Nationality: Swedish
- Born: 31 March 1990 (age 36) Karlshamn, Sweden
- Height: 1.88 m (6 ft 2 in)

Sport
- Sport: Handball
- Position: Centre back
- Current club: Fenix Toulouse
- Number: 4

Youth career
- Years: Team
- –: Karlshamn HF

Senior clubs
- Years: Team
- 2008–2015: IFK Kristianstad
- 2015–2018: Skjern Håndbold
- 2018–2020: Fenix Toulouse
- 2020–2025: IFK Kristianstad
National team
Years	Team	Apps	(Gls)
2012–2019	Sweden	62	(116)
- Updated on 6 August 2022

Markus Olsson (born 31 March 1990) is a Swedish former handball player who played for the Swedish national team.

== Career ==
Olsson started playing handball at his hometown club Karlshamn HF, and in 2008, he joined IFK Kristianstad. He won the Swedish Championship with IFK Kristianstad in 2015. The following summer he joined Danish club Skjern Håndbold. He won the Danish Men's Handball Cup in 2015 with them, as well as the 2017-18 Danish Championship.

In 2018, he joined French Fenix Toulouse Handball. In 2020, he returned to Sweden and IFK Kristianstad. In 2023, he won the double with the club. He retired after the 2024-25 season.

== Private ==
His sisters, Maria and Anna, are also handball players.
