= Maria Olsson =

Swedish handball player (born 1986)

Personal information
- Full name: Eva Maria Olsson
- Nationality: Swedish
- Born: 5 December 1986 (age 39) Karlshamn, Sweden
- Height: 1.70 m (5 ft 7 in)

Sport
- Sport: Handball
- Position: Goalkeeper
- Current club: Retired
National team
Years	Team	Apps	(Gls)
2012-2013	Sweden	11	(0)

Maria Olsson (born 8 December 1986) is a Swedish former handball player who played for the Swedish national team. At slub level she played for Eslövs IK, Aalborg DH, Lugi HF and Kristianstad HK.

== Private ==
Her brother, Markus Olsson and her sister, Anna Olsson, are also handball players.
