= Lars-Göran Jönsson =

Swedish handball player (born 1951)

Personal information
- Nationality: Swedish
- Citizenship: Sweden
- Born: Karlskrona, Sweden
- Occupation: handball player

Sport
- Sport: handball

Lars-Göran Jönsson (pronounced [lɑːʂˈjœ̂ːran ˈjœ̌nːsɔn]; born 23 February 1951) is a Swedish former handball player. He was known for his hard shots. Raised in Karlskrona, he signed for IFK Kristianstad in 1973. In 1974–75, he helped the team reach the Swedish Championship final, where they were defeated by HK Drott. Jönsson, Bo Ahlberg and Lennarth Ebbinge were known as the "Wild West line" (Vilda Västern-kedjan), as a result of often shooting at the first opportunity. He played 115 matches and scored 582 goals for Kristianstad in the top division. He also played 73 matches for Sweden between 1975 and 1979, and participated in the 1978 World Championship. In his final year with the national team he only played in defence. In 1979, he returned to his hometown to play for IFK Karlskrona, where he finished his career.
