= Lisette de Brinon =

Lisette, Marquise de Brinon (1896 – 26 March 1982) was best known as the Jewish wife of the pro-Nazi French collaborator, Fernand de Brinon.

== Biography ==
Born Jeanne Louise Rachel Franck, she lived in an internal exile throughout the Second World War. Declared an "honorary Aryan", she was not deported to her death, but neither was she welcome in Vichy or in Paris.

Born to a family of Jewish bankers in Paris and formerly married to a Jewish banker Claude Ullmann, Lisette de Brinon was an inveterate socialite, surrounding herself with notables of the left (Léon Blum) and of the right (Pierre Drieu la Rochelle). Emmanuel Berl, best known for writing some of Philippe Pétain's early speeches, was a first cousin. She converted from Judaism to Catholicism.

Her second husband, Fernand, Marquis de Brinon, was a Catholic aristocrat who distinguished himself with an early scoop interview with Adolf Hitler, and became one of the architects of French collaboration after France's catastrophic defeat at the hands of the Nazis in June 1940. As the war progressed, the couple were distanced partly by Lisette's inconvenient Jewishness, and also because of Brinon's long-term affair with his secretary Simone Mittre. Lisette attempted to follow Brinon when the Vichy government fled to exile in the castle of the Sigmaringen enclave following the Allied liberation. Although she managed to risk death by entering Germany, she never reached the castle.

Brinon and her husband were captured by Allied Forces and taken to stand trial in Toulouse. She was imprisoned briefly while her husband was found guilty of treason and executed in 1947. She was a friend of another collaborator, Jacques Benoist-Méchin.

She died in 1982 in a nursing home in the Paris suburb of Montmorency.

== Sources ==
- Bernard Ullmann, Lisette de Brinon, ma mère: Une Juive dans la tourmente de la Collaboration (Editions Complexe, Paris, 2004, ISBN 2-87027-997-3).
