= Lennarth Ebbinge =

Swedish handball player and coach (born 1956)

Bo Gunnar Lennart "Ebba" Ebbinge, normally just called Lennarth Ebbinge (pronounced [ˈlɛ̌nːaʈ ˈɛ̂bːɪŋɛ]; born 9 May 1956 in Kristianstad, Sweden) is a Swedish former handball player and coach, who played as right wing.

He made his senior debut at second-tier team Näsby IF. In 1976 he signed for cross-town rivals IFK Kristianstad. In his first season with the club, he was the top goalscorer of Allsvenskan. Ebbinge, Bo Ahlberg and Lars-Göran Jönsson were known as the "Wild West line" (Vilda Västern-kedjan), as a result of often shooting at the first opportunity. In 1979 he joined IK Heim, winning the Swedish championship with the club in 1981–82 and 1982–83. In 1984, Ebbinge joined GF Kroppskultur, where he played for a single season. He played for Spanish club Maritim Puerto Cruz from 1985 to 1989. In 1989 he returned to Kristianstad, playing for the club for a single season and helping them to reach promotion back to the top division. In 1990 he returned to Näsby IF where he finished his career.

In 1984 he finished fifth with the Swedish team in the Olympic tournament. He played three matches and scored six goals. In total he played 77 matches for Sweden.

Ebbinge was coach for Kristianstad HK from 2011 to 2016.
