= Jacob Kjeldgaard =

Danish caricaturist and photographer (1884–1964)

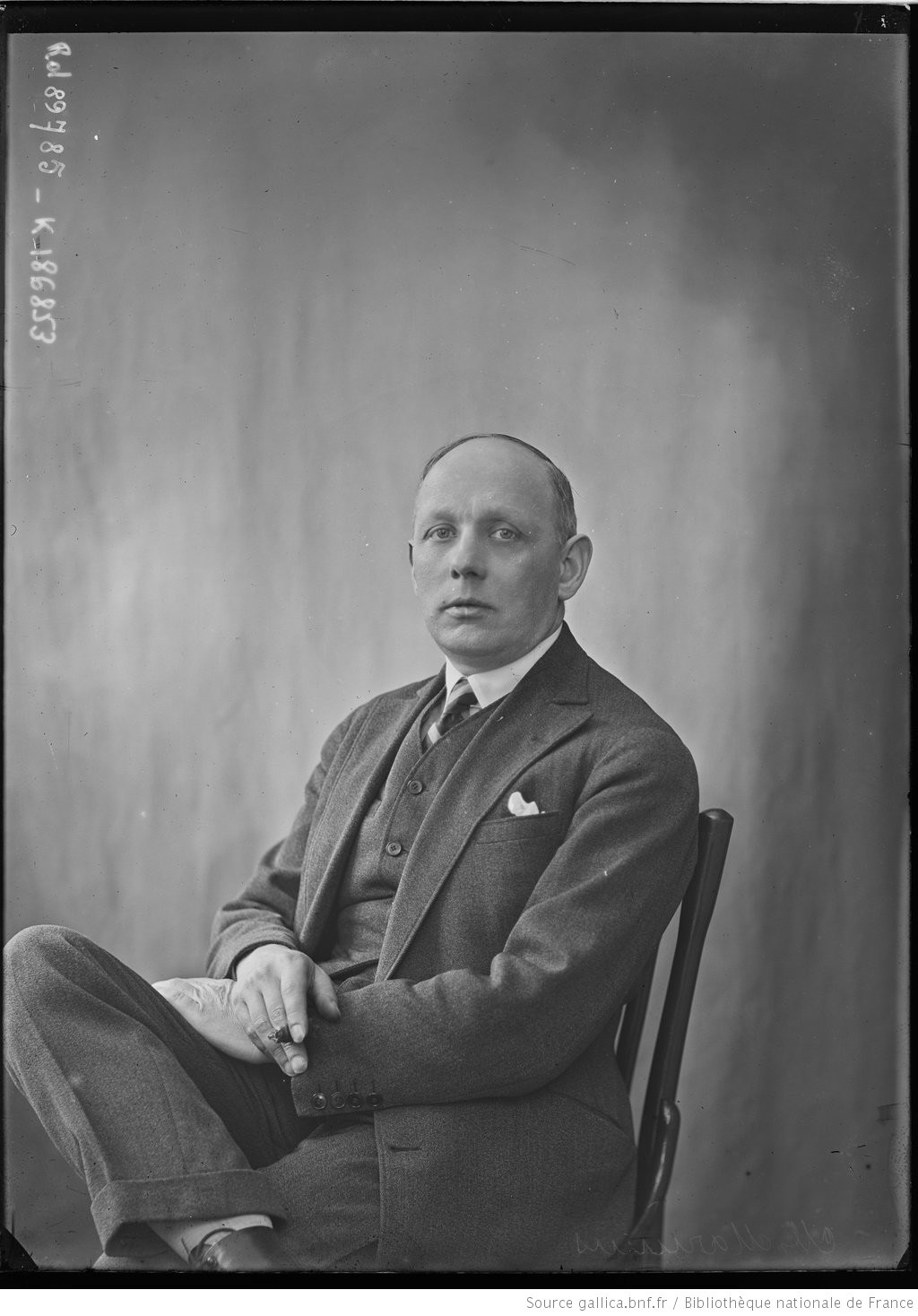
Portrait of Marinus, Paris 1924

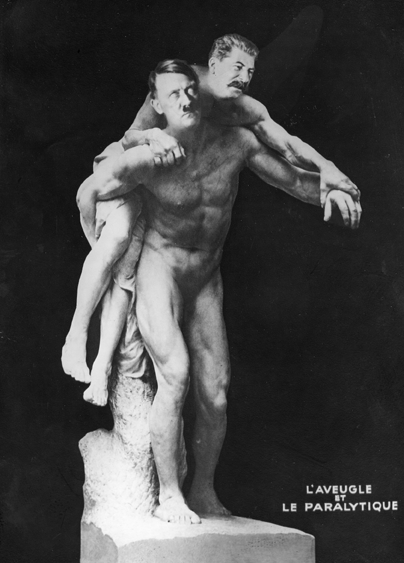
The blind Hitler carrying the lame Stalin. When they combine they can both be on the move... Printed i Marianne on the 28th of February 1940

Marinus Jacob Kjeldgaard (4 September 1884 – 6 February 1964) was a Danish photographer and journalist active in France. Most well known by his pseudonym "Marinus," he created satirical photomontages for the French periodical Marianne (magazine: 1932-40), works similar to those of John Heartfield.

== Biography ==
He was the fifth child of a Danish master craftsman; after grade school he attended a polytechnical school. He wanted to be an artist and attended art school for several years before working with his family to create electric lighted signs for businesses. He emigrated in 1909 to Paris.

=== Photomontages ===
His photomontages were inspired by classical masterpieces and by the cinema. His most important works were pacifist political montages against Hitler and Stalin. Because he created work under the pseudonym "Marinus," Kjeldgaard survived the German occupation of France without drawing suspicion that he was a political agitator.

One of his works published in J'ai Vu on October 20, 1917, showed the American ambassador to Germany and Frenchman Bolo Pasha in conversation, implicating the two in treasonous activity and collaboration with the Germans. The montage was so convincing that Marinus was called into court to testify that he had created the artwork and thus it was not usable as evidence.

==== Posthumous legacy ====
His work has been rediscovered in recent years, initially through a 2007 exhibition titled "Marinus and Marianne" at the art museum in Aalborg, Denmark. The Museum Ludwig in Cologne held a retrospective exhibition of Marinus and Heartfield in 2008.

== See also ==
- Marianne (magazine: 1932-40)
- Photomontage
