= Emmanuel Berl =

French journalist, historian and essayist (1892–1976)

Emmanuel Berl (2 August 1892 – 21 September 1976) was a French journalist, historian and essayist. He was born at Le Vésinet in the modern département of Yvelines, and is buried in the Montparnasse Cemetery, Paris. In 1937 he married the singer, composer and film actress Mireille Hartuch; she had nicknamed him "Théodore" (which is what appears on their tomb). Berl was the cousin of Lisette de Brinon.

== Biography ==
Emmanuel Berl was from an upper middle class Jewish family related to Bergson and Proust and the novelist and screenwriter Monique Lange. He studied philosophy before volunteering for the armed services in 1914. Discharged in 1917 with a respiratory disease after having received the Croix de Guerre (or, war cross), he joined the surrealists, especially working with Louis Aragon, Gaston Bergery and his former schoolmate from the Lycée Carnot, Pierre Drieu La Rochelle. In 1927, Berl and La Rochelle published a short-lived periodical: Les Derniers Jours. In 1928, with Édouard Berth, Marcel Déat, Bertrand de Jouvenel and Pierre Mendès-France, he took part in the editing of the Cahiers bleus which George Valois had just launched. The same year, he met André Malraux to whom he dedicated his Mort de la pensée bourgeoise, a satire in which Emmanuel Berl called for a more committed culture and literature.

During the 1930s, he entered politics on the side of the radicals. After working for the weekly Monde, in 1932 he edited the weekly Marianne (magazine: 1932-40), which was the leading weekly on the left until the appearance of Vendredi in 1935. In it, he defended a political line favourable to the Popular Front but his intransigent pacifism and his equal refusal of both fascist and communist totalitarianism led him to adopt heterodox positions and to show his curiosity and sympathies in neo-socialism. He clashed with the left because he favoured equipping France with a large and strong army. He stated: "Je suis pour la force et contre la violence" ("I am for force and against violence").

In 1937, Éditions Gallimard sold Marianne. Emmanuel Berl resigned from the paper and founded a new weekly: Le Pavé de Paris, which he led until the exodus from Paris in 1940. He left for the southwest before being called on 17 June to Bordeaux, where worked on a speech for Marshal Philippe Pétain (then president of the council). He also drafted the two speeches of 23 and 25 June. After a short spell in Vichy, he turned his back on the new regime and returned to his wife Mireille in Cannes and settled, in July 1941, in Argentat. There he drafted Histoire de l'Europe (History of Europe) and was reunited with Bertrand de Jouvenal, Jean Effel and André Malraux.

After World War II, he left politics to concentrate on literature and editing autobiographical works, including the notable book Sylvia. In 1967, the Académie française awarded him the Grand Prix de littérature.

After his death, at Paris, Patrick Modiano and Bernard Morlino were instrumental in maintaining his memory. The former published Interrogatoire, and the latter published two posthumous books of his friend: Essais and Un spectateur engagé. Morlino also published his own works: Les tribulations d'un pacifiste and Berl, Morand et moi.

== Literary works ==
- Méditation sur un amour défunt (1925),
- Mort de la pensée bourgeoise (1929)
- Mort de la morale bourgeoise (1930)
- Le Bourgeois et l'Amour (1931)
- Sylvia (1952)
- Présences des morts (1956)
- Rachel et autres grâces (1965)
- Trois Faces du sacré (1971)
- Le Virage (1972)
- Essais, collected texts chosen and presented by Bernard Morlino, 1985
- Interrogatoire par Patrick Modiano followed by Il fait beau, allons au cimetière (1976)
- Tant que vous penserez à moi (in collaboration with Jean d'Ormesson), 1992
