= Miroslav Baumruk =

Czech basketball player (1926–1997)

Personal information
- Nationality: Czech
- Born: 12 July 1926 Prague, Czechoslovakia
- Died: 1997 (aged 69–70)

Sport
- Sport: Basketball

Miroslav Baumruk (12 July 1926 – 1997) was a Czech basketball player. He competed in the men's tournament at the 1952 Summer Olympics. Baumruk died in 1997.
