= Bo Ahlberg =

Swedish handball player (born 1951)

Personal information
- Full name: Bo Ingemar Ahlberg
- Nationality: Swedish
- Born: 3 April 1951 (age 75) Kristianstad, Sweden

Sport
- Sport: Handball
- Position: Left wing
- Current club: Telekom Veszprém
- Number: 21

Youth career
- Years: Team
- –: Kristianstad BI
- –: Näsby IF

Senior clubs
- Years: Team
- 1971-1986: IFK Kristianstad
National team
Years	Team	Apps	(Gls)
1975-1976	Sweden	8	(8)

Bo Ahlberg (pronounced [ˈbuː ˈɑ̂ːlbærj]; born 3 April 1951) is a Swedish former handball player.

He played his entire elite career for IFK Kristianstad. Before elite he played for two lokal clubs KBI and Näsby IF. He holds the records for most appearances in IFK Kristianstad and most goals scored in the top division for IFK Kristianstad, as well as for most goals in all divisions for the club. He made his debut for the team in 1971. In 1974–75, he helped his team reach the Swedish Championship final, where they were beaten by HK Drott.

In the following season 1975–76, Ahlberg was the top scorer of the league. Ahlberg, Lennarth Ebbinge and Lars-Göran Jönsson were known as the "Wild West line" (Vilda Västern-kedjan), as a result of often shooting at the first opportunity. He made his last top-flight appearance for the club in 1986. He played 222 matches and scored 926 goals in the top division, and scored 1724 goals in total for Kristianstad. He also played 8 matches for Sweden, all in 1976.
