= Ólafur Guðmundsson =

Icelandic handball player (born 1990)

Ólafur Andrés Guðmundsson
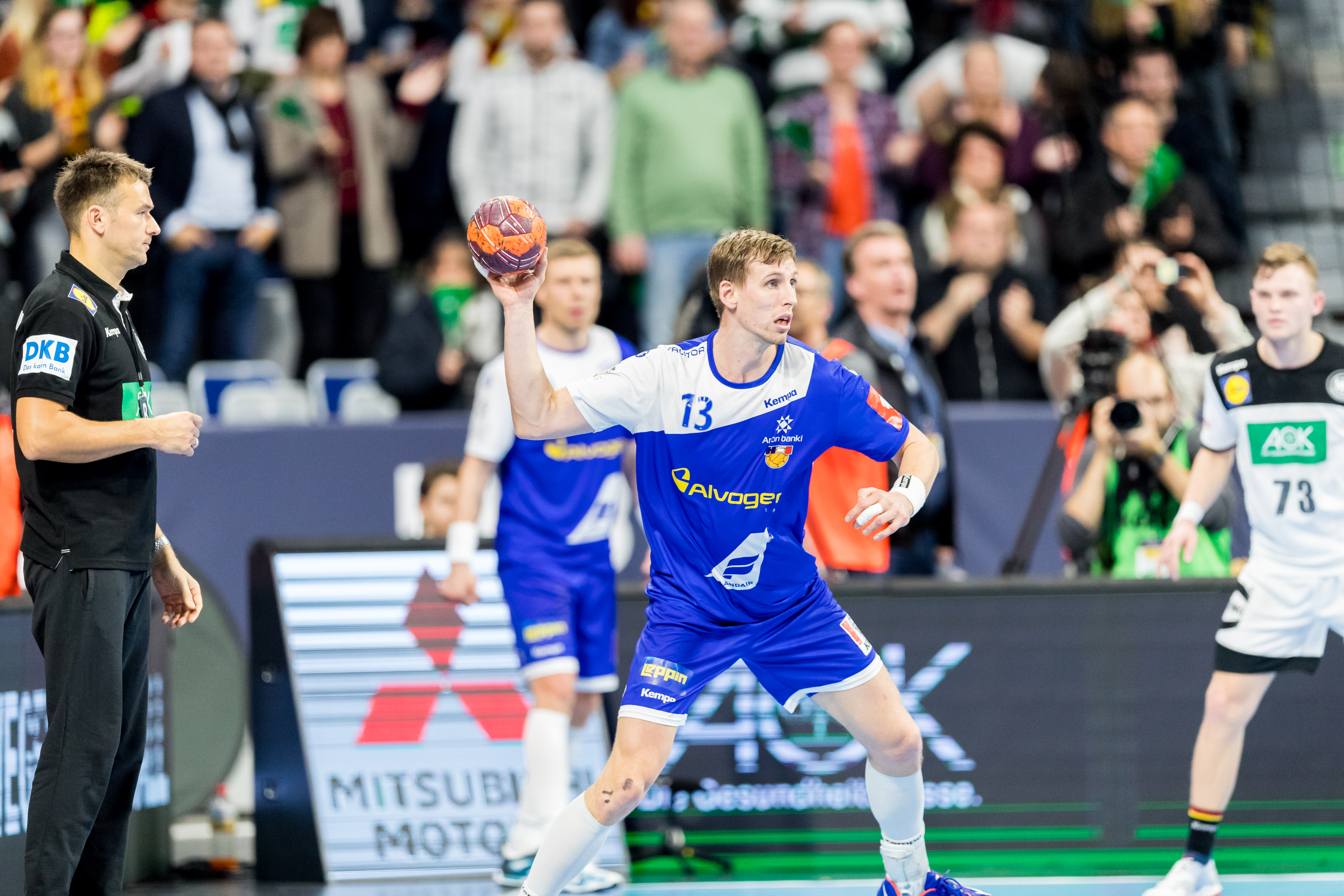

Personal information
- Full name: Ólafur Andrés Guðmundsson
- Nationality: Icelandic
- Born: 13 May 1990 (age 36) Hafnarfjörður, Iceland
- Height: 1.94 m (6 ft 4 in)

Sport
- Sport: Handball
- Position: Left back
- Current club: HF Karlskrona

Senior clubs
- Years: Team
- –2010: FH
- 2010–2011: AG København
- 2011–2012: Nordsjælland Håndbold
- 2012–2014: IFK Kristianstad
- 2014–2015: TSV Hannover-Burgdorf
- 2015–2021: IFK Kristianstad
- 2021–2022: Montpellier Handball
- 2022–2023: GC Amicitia Zürich
- 2023–: HF Karlskrona
National team
Years	Team	Apps	(Gls)
2010–	Iceland	122	(228)
Medal record
European Championship
Bronze medal – third place	2010 Austria

Ólafur Andrés Guðmundsson (born 13 May 1990) is an Icelandic handball player for HF Karlskrona and the Icelandic national team.

He represented Iceland at the 2019 World Men's Handball Championship.
