= Marcel Gaudion =

French handball player (1924–2021)

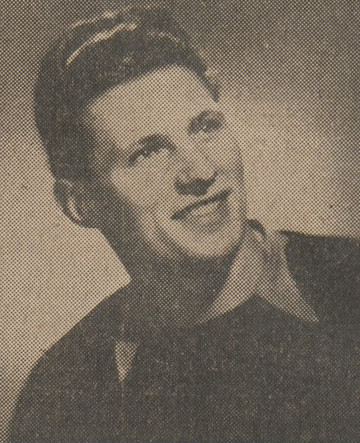
- Marcel Gaudion before 1946

Personal information
- Born: 12 January 1924 Gagny, French Third Republic
- Died: 23 April 2021 (aged 97) Douarnenez, France
- Height: 185 cm (73 in)

Sport
- Sport: Handball
- Position: Runner

Senior clubs
- Years: Team
- 1941 - early 1960's: Villemomble Sports
National team
Years	Team	Apps	(Gls)
1946 - 1954	France (Field)	16	(18)
1953 - 1955	France (Indoor)	7	(17)
- Updated on 28 November 2021

Marcel Gaudion (12 January 1924 – 23 April 2021) was a French handball player. He was born in Gagny, French Third Republic.

== National team ==
He was part of the first game of the French national Field handball team on 12 May 1946 against Luxembourg. He played at the 1952 IHF World Men's Outdoor Handball Championship in Switzerland.

Indoor he played 7 games where he was always the Captain of the team. He played at the 1954 World Men's Handball Championship.

== Club ==
At the club level he played for Villemomble Sports. He had a big regret that he was not able to share the 1945 French title with his youth friends Robert Hébert and Henri Girard who died during the Liberation of Paris. 1952-53 he was handball of the year in France.

- Field handball
  - 7 French cup winner: 1945, 1946, 1949, 1950, 1951, 1952, 1953
  - ? French cup runner-up: 1943
  - 2 French champions: 1945, 1949
  - ? Paris championship runner-up:1943-44, 1945
- Indoor handball
  - 1 French champion: 1953

== Other sports ==
Besides handball he was sportive in many sports including track and field, Cyclo-cross and Basketball:

- 3 place French cadet championship in triathlon
- Finalist French cadet championship in Cyclo-cross
- 3 place Paris junior championship in Shot put
