= IFK Kristianstad =

Swedish handball club

- Full name: Idrottsföreningen Kamraterna Kristianstad
- Short name: Kristianstad, IFK (locally)
- Founded: 7 November 1899; 127 years ago
- Arena: Kristianstad Arena, Kristianstad
- Capacity: 5200
- President: Magnus Lindahl
- Head coach: Björn Sätherström
- League: Handbollsligan
- 2025–26: 2nd
- Club colours
Home	Away

Idrottsföreningen Kamraterna Kristianstad (pronounced [krɪˈɧǎnːsta, -ɑːd]), or IFK Kristianstad, is a Swedish professional handball club based in Kristianstad. They play in Handbollsligan, the top level of Swedish men's handball. The club was founded in 1899 as a multi-sport club. The handball team made its debut in 1925 and has been the only section of the club since 2000. The club plays its home matches at Kristianstad Arena.

Kristianstad have won nine Swedish Championship (SM) gold medals. They won their first gold in 1941. From 1946 to 1957 they were a consistent top team, finishing in the top four every year and winning three golds. They were again a contender in the 1970s, losing the final in 1975. In the 1980s and 1990s, they mainly yo-yoed between the top two divisions. After spending the entire 2000s decade outside the top flight, Kristianstad enjoyed a massive resurgence in the 2010s, culminating in four consecutive golds from 2015 to 2018. In 2023 they won another SM gold as well as their first Swedish Cup title.

In 2018–19, the team had an average attendance of 4271, the highest in Swedish handball. While the club, like most Idrottsföreningen Kamraterna (IFK) clubs, has a blue and white logo, its shirt colour is orange. The club uses the slogan Sveriges häftigaste handbollsklubb ("Sweden's coolest handball club").

Location of IFK Kristianstad

== History ==
=== Early years (1899–1945) ===
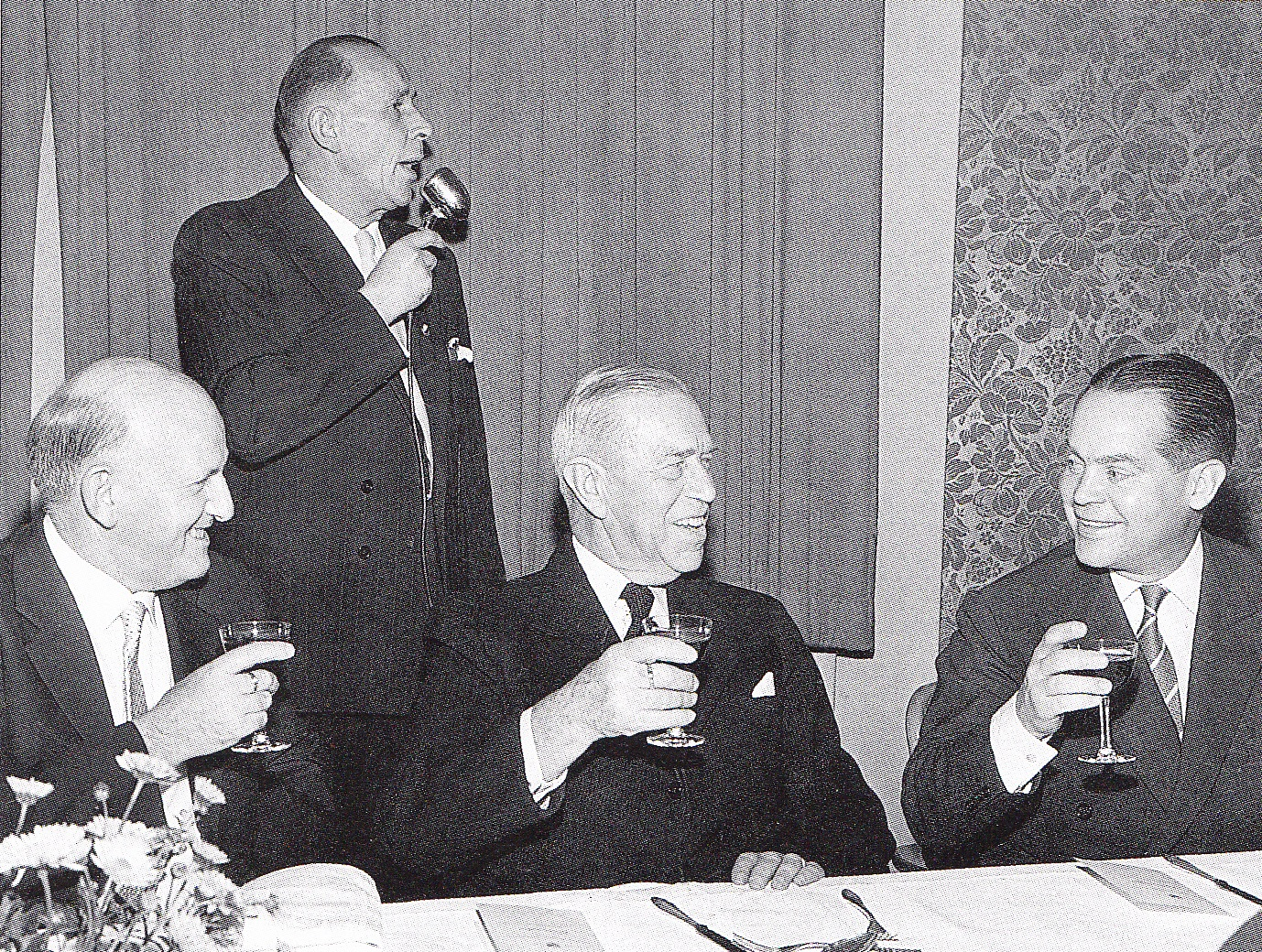
Adolf Johnson, founder of IFK Kristianstad (sitting in the middle)

IFK Kristianstad was founded on 7 November 1899 as a multi-sport club by Adolf Johnsson, a secondary school pupil from Broby. Johnsson was the first chairman of the club. The club previously had sections in field handball, football, cycling, athletics, and gymnastics as well as women's handball, but has only been a men's handball club since 2000 when the other sections formed separate clubs due to IFK Kristianstad's financial troubles. The first City Championship in handball in Kristianstad was played in 1925. IFK Kristianstad competed against school and armed forces teams, as well as rival clubs. IFK Kristianstad won the tournament in 1925 and 1928. A Provincial Championship for the clubs in Scania was first played in 1932, which IFK Kristianstad won in 1933 and 1935. In 1933–34, IFK Kristianstad played in an unofficial league consisting of teams from the cities of Kristianstad and Ystad, finishing second behind Ystads IF.

The team made its debut in the league system in 1935, coached by Oscar Meyer. At the time the Swedish Championship (Svenska mästerskapet, SM) was decided as a knockout tournament independent of the league. Until 1946, the tournament was contested only by the Provincial champions. In the league, Kristianstad reached the top division, at the time known as Allsvenskan, in 1936–37, but were immediately relegated. Meyer left as coach after that season and former SM winner Eskil Gustafsson was signed from Majornas IK as player-coach. They were promoted again in 1939 and finished second in the league that year. However, they failed to win the Provincial Championship and did not participate in SM. They finished second in the league again in 1940–41. They won their first SM gold in the same year, defeating second-tier IFK Uppsala in the final by 17–8.

=== First golden era (1945–1957) ===
In 1945, Gustafsson was replaced as coach by another player-coach, Karl Erik Nilsson. In Nilsson's first season, Kristianstad won the second division and were promoted back to the top division. In the same season they reached the SM semi-finals, where they were beaten by Majorna. From 1946 to 1957, Kristianstad finished top 4 in the league for 11 consecutive seasons. Behind this success was a core of players from the club's youth system, such as Carl-Erik Stockenberg, Åke Moberg, Bertil Rönndahl and Erik Nordström. In 1946–47, the team finished third in the league, but were eliminated by Ystads IF in the round of 16 of SM. Starting in this season, the SM tournament was contested by all top-flight teams and all Provincial champions, as well as invited lower-league teams. Nilsson left in 1947 and Gustafsson returned as coach. In the first season after Gustafsson's return, Kristianstad finished second in the league behind Redbergslids IK. They won their second SM gold after beating Redbergslid in the final by 8–7. In 1948–49 they finished second in the league again, but their title defence in SM ended in the semi-finals against IFK Lidingö.

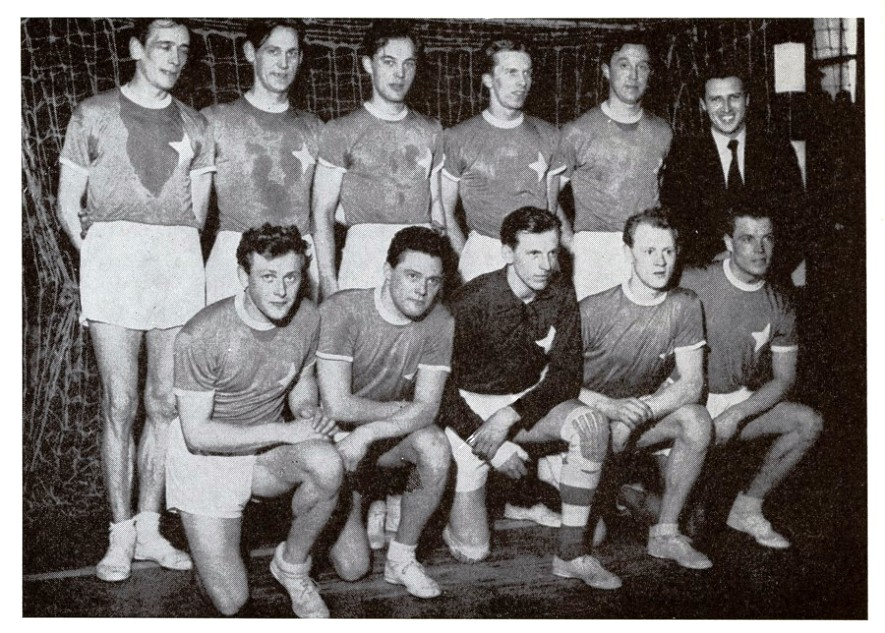
The 1952–53 Swedish Championship-winning IFK Kristianstad squad

In 1949–50, Kristianstad won the league but were eliminated from SM by IK Baltichov in the round of 16. After that season, Gustafsson was replaced by co-player-coaches Karl Fridlundh, Moberg and Evert Sjunnesson. In their first season in charge, the club finished third in the league and reached the SM final, where they were beaten by second-tier team AIK. The following season they won the league and set up a re-match against AIK in the SM final after eliminating cross-town rivals Näsby IF in the semi-finals. They defeated AIK by 16–15 after extra time to win their third SM gold. After this season, the SM tournament was discontinued and the SM title was awarded to the league winners. In 1952–53, they won the league which earned them their fourth SM gold. They finished second in the league in the next two seasons, behind Redbergslid and IK Heim, respectively. In 1954, three Kristianstad players (Moberg, Sjunnesson and Stockenberg) were members of the Swedish team that won the country's first World Championship. Between 1953 and 1957, several key players left the team and their success started declining.

=== Title drought (1957–2007) ===
Kristianstad suffered two successive relegations in 1958 and 1959. After spending two seasons at the third level they were promoted to the second division, where they remained until being promoted back to Allsvenskan in 1970. By this time, a playoff tournament featuring the top 4 in the league had been introduced to determine the champions. The 1970s was the first time that the club featured a significant number of players from outside the Kristianstad area, including Thomas Persson, Einar Jakobsson and Lars-Göran Jönsson. In 1971–72, Sjunnesson coached the team to a fourth place in the league, earning them a spot in the playoffs, but they were eliminated by SoIK Hellas in the semi-finals. In 1972, Kristianstad players Sten Olsson and Persson were included in Sweden's squad for the Olympics. Coached by Leif Rosenberg, Kristianstad finished second in the league in 1974–75 and qualified for the playoffs. They won the semi-finals against Heim but lost the finals to Drott. The club was relegated in 1981 and only played 3 of 11 seasons in the top flight from 1981 to 1992.

From the 1990–91 season until 2002–03, Swedish league handball was split into autumn and spring leagues. The eight highest-ranked teams in the autumn edition of the top division, now known as Elitserien, qualified for the spring league whereas the remaining four were relegated to compete in Allsvenskan along with teams from each of the two second-tier Division 1 leagues. In 1994–95, coach Urban Harju led the team to sixth place in the spring league, which earned them a spot in the playoffs. However, they lost the quarter-final series. In 1996–97, now with Dragan Mihailovic as coach, they finished fifth in the spring league, but again lost the quarter-final series. The following season, they finished 11th in the league and were relegated after finishing 7th in Allsvenskan.

This relegation was followed by a period of financial trouble for the club. By the end of 2000, it had 2.7 million SEK in debt, and was unable to pay its players and staff. Additionally, in 2002, a former chairman and three board members were charged with tax evasion, being accused of having evaded taxes for payments of 1.7 million SEK between 1995 and 1997. Bankruptcy was a very real possibility for the club. However, the tax evasion trial was cancelled due to one of the suspects, whom the prosecutor believed to hold key information, falling severely ill. By 2003, the club had stabilised its economy and paid its debts. This period was also the club's on-field nadir; they sank as low as the fourth level in the spring of 2000 and the spring of 2002.

=== Start of resurgence (2007–2014) ===
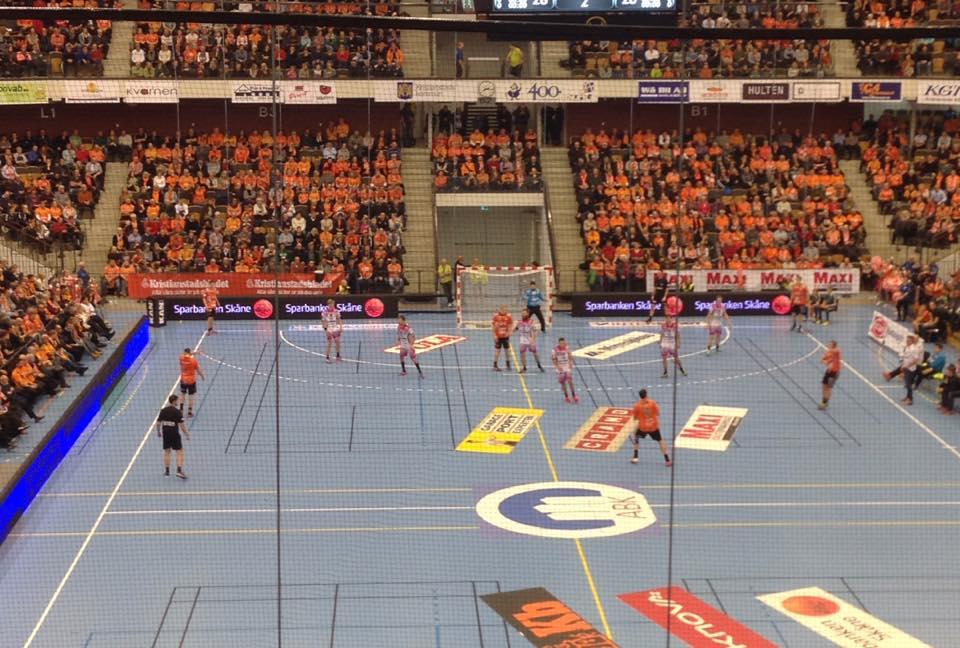
A match between Kristianstad and HK Malmö in the new Kristianstad Arena

A resurgence for the club started with the appointment of Kenneth Andersson as coach in 2007. In his first year, Kristianstad finished third in the second division and qualified for the promotion playoffs. However, they lost the series against Trelleborg. In 2008–09 they finished second in the division and were promoted automatically. In 2009, Kristianstad hired Nikolas Larsson as the club director. He has been credited with a major part in the club's recent success. From 2009 to 2016, the club's equity went from −1.3 million SEK to +6.1 million SEK, the highest in the league. During the same time, the club's revenue has increased from 5.6 million SEK to 32.4 million SEK, the second highest in the league behind IK Sävehof (whose numbers include the annual Partille Cup and a dominant women's team). Larsson left the club in 2018. In 2010, Kristianstad moved from Kristianstad Idrottshall to the newly built Kristianstad Arena. In both 2009–10 and 2010–11, they finished 11th in the league and narrowly avoided relegation after finishing second in the relegation league both times. Despite this, they had the highest average attendance in the league (2769) in 2010–11.

Over the next four seasons, Kristianstad would improve their finishing position each year. In 2011–12, they finished sixth in the league and qualified for the playoffs. In February that season, Andersson was replaced by Sweden coach Ola Lindgren, who continued to coach Sweden in addition to Kristanstad until 2016. They reached the SM final by upsetting league winners Guif by three games to two in a close semi-final series. However, they lost in the final against heavily favoured Sävehof by 29–21. Lindgren made major changes in the squad in his first few years in charge to strengthen the team and introduce the right "attitude" in the squad. In 2012–13, Kristianstad made their first appearance in a pan-European competition, as they participated in the EHF Cup. They were eliminated by Guif in the second qualifying round. They improved to third in the league and reached their second consecutive final, which they went on to lose against Drott in a very close match by 28–27. They participated in the EHF Cup again in the following season, where they reached the group stage, but finished last of the four teams in their group. Meanwhile, they finished second in the league for the first time since 1975, but lost the semi-finals to Lugi.

=== Second golden era (2014–present) ===
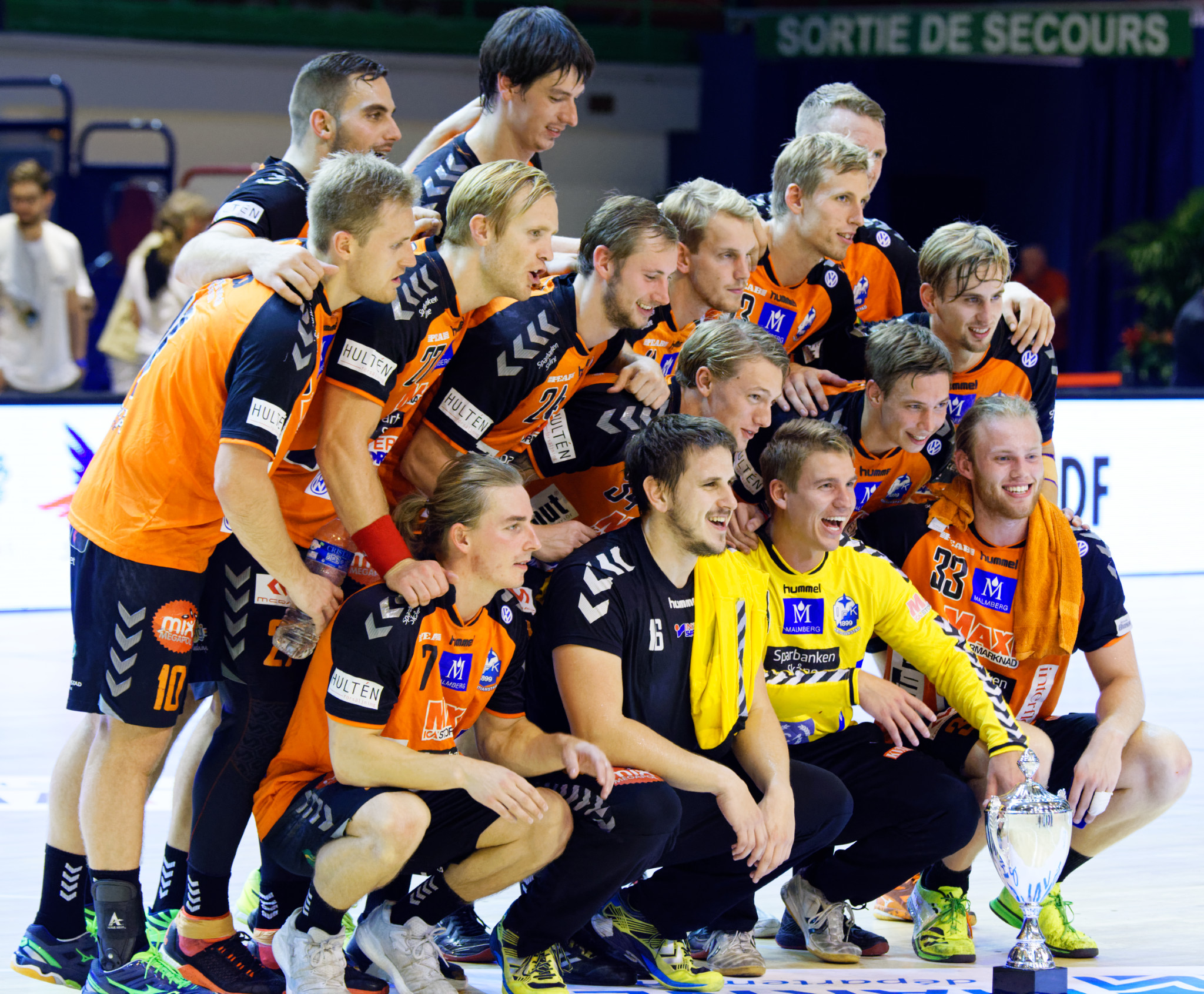
Kristianstad's squad in September 2016.

In 2014–15, the club was unable to qualify for the EHF Cup group stage, losing to German powerhouse HSV Hamburg in the last qualifying round on away goals. From the 2014–15 season to 2017–18, Kristianstad won both the regular season and the SM gold for four consecutive seasons. They defeated Alingsås in the final in the first three of these seasons, with the 2015 final being the closest. In 2015–16, they qualified for the Champions League, where only one spot is allocated to Sweden for the SM winners. They were placed in the top 16 (groups A and B), and finished seventh in their group on head-to-head record behind Montpellier, narrowly outside of the top six who advance to the next round. Domestically, they won 30 of 32 matches in the regular season and won the league by 16 points, eight wins ahead of second-place Alingsås. Kristianstad player Jerry Tollbring was selected for Sweden's squad in the 2016 Olympics. In the 2016–17 Champions League, Kristianstad were again placed in the top 16, but finished last in the group, a single point behind Zagreb for the knockout stage spots. For the third consecutive season, Kristianstad played in the top 16 of the Champions League in 2017–18. They advanced from the group stage for the first time before being eliminated by German club Flensburg-Handewitt. They won the 2018 SM final against HK Malmö by 23–22 after extra time. Lindgren resigned in January 2019 due to disagreements with the club, after they had decided not to extend his contract after the 2018–19 season. He was replaced by Ljubomir Vranjes. Kristianstad won their fifth consecutive regular season title that season, but were swept by Alingsås in the semi-finals. In the 2010s, they had a lot of success in spite of frequently losing important players to foreign teams, including six full internationals in 2016, Tollbring and Nebojša Simić in 2017 and Albin Lagergren and Tim Sørensen in 2018.

Vranjes was sacked in December 2020 and replaced by interim coach Ulf Larsson until the end of the season. At the start of the following season Jonas Wille was appointed coach. He left the club after one season and was replaced by Stian Tønnesen. In 2022–23 Kristianstad became the second club in history to win the treble of the regular season, the Swedish Cup and SM, (Note: The first was Hellas in 1971; the Swedish Cup was not played from the 1991–92 season to 2020–21) defeating Hammarby in the Cup finals and Sävehof in the SM finals.

== Colours and crest ==
Unlike most IFK clubs, who play in blue and white kits, Kristianstad play in orange shirts. It is unclear why they use this colour. One explanation is that they chose the colour to avoid the need for an away kit, although this is unconfirmed. Club historian Alf Braun states that the team played in orange when the handball section started in the 1930s, and played the 1933 Provincial Championship final in orange shirts and brown trousers. He says that they later started using blue and white shirts in 1948, but switched back to orange during the 1950–51 season. According to former player Uno Kvist, they used blue and white in 1953 but later played "mostly" in orange.

The club does, however, have a blue and white logo. The logo features a four-pointed star, which is a symbol for IFK, on a shield split diagonally in a white and a blue half, along with the club's name and year of establishment. The logo has had a similar design at least since the early 1950s. The team had only the four-pointed star on their shirts until the 1970s, when they replaced it with the full logo.

Kit in 1933

Kit in 1948

Kit in 1951–52

Kit in 1953

Kit in 2014–15

=== Kits ===
HOME
2009–10	2010–12	2012–14	2014–15	2020–

AWAY
2018–19	2020–

THIRD
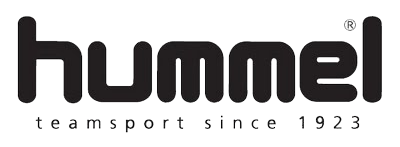
2020–

== Arenas ==
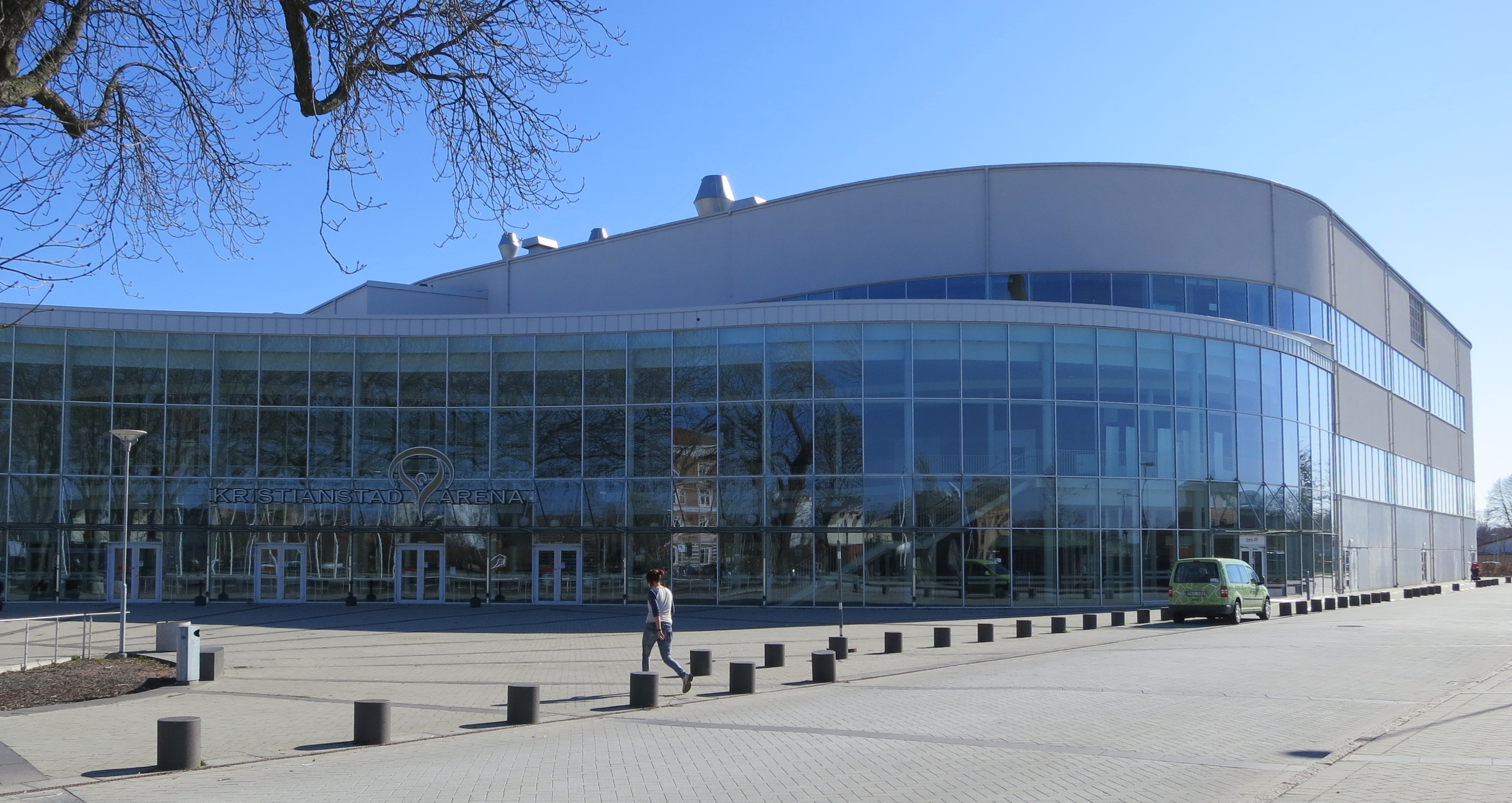
Kristianstad play their home matches at Kristianstad Arena.

Kristianstad have had four different arenas. From 1935 to 1947, the team played in Södra kaserns gymnastiksal. The field was only 13.5 meters wide, which meant that the goal-area lines crossed the side lines rather than the outer goal lines. Due to these unusual dimensions, the arena was commonly known as Korridoren ("the Corridor"). The separation between the spectators and the field was poor and it was possible for fans to trip opposing players. While the official capacity of the arena was between 1200 and 1300, the record attendance is 1655 in a match against Djurgårdens IF in December 1939.

Between 1947 and 1964, Kristianstad played at Sporthallen, which was created from a rebuilt horse riding arena and only intended as a temporary solution. The arena only had stands at the short ends. The record attendance at Sporthallen is 2464, in a top-of-the-league clash against Redbergslids IK in February 1948. At the end of 1964, the team moved to Kristianstads Idrottshall (Idrottshallen), its first "proper" arena. It was the first arena of the club to host international matches. The record attendance for Kristianstad at Idrottshallen was 2701, well above the allowed capacity of the arena, in the final series against HK Drott in 1975.

Since 2010, Kristanstad play their home matches at Kristianstad Arena, which has a capacity of 5200. It is adjacent to Idrottshallen. Kristianstad played their first match at the new arena on 17 October 2010, a 31–31 draw against Redbergslid. Kristianstad's highest attendance at the arena is 5221 in the 2018 semi-finals against Lugi. Kristianstad Arena is a multi-purpose venue, which is also used for other sports (both major events, grassroot, and school sport), concerts and other events. The arena was one of the venues for the 2011 World Championship.

== Supporters and rivalries ==
Kristianstad's official supporter club is Södra Kurvan ("the South Stand"). It was formed in 2010 as a reaction to the relative lack of atmosphere at home matches after the move from Kristianstad Idrottshall to Kristianstad Arena, due to an inability to fill the much larger arena. It is a nonprofit organisation with its own board and members. Since its establishment, Södra Kurvan has gained over 500 members. Kristianstad have drawn large crowds in recent years, having the highest average attendance in the league every season from the 2010–11 season to 2018–19. The shirt number 8 is reserved for the fans, symbolising that they are the 8th player for the team.

While Kristianstad do not have a traditional rival, matches against other Scania teams, including OV Helsingborg HK, Lugi HF, HK Malmö, Ystads IF and IFK Ystad HK, are considered derbies.

== Records and statistics ==
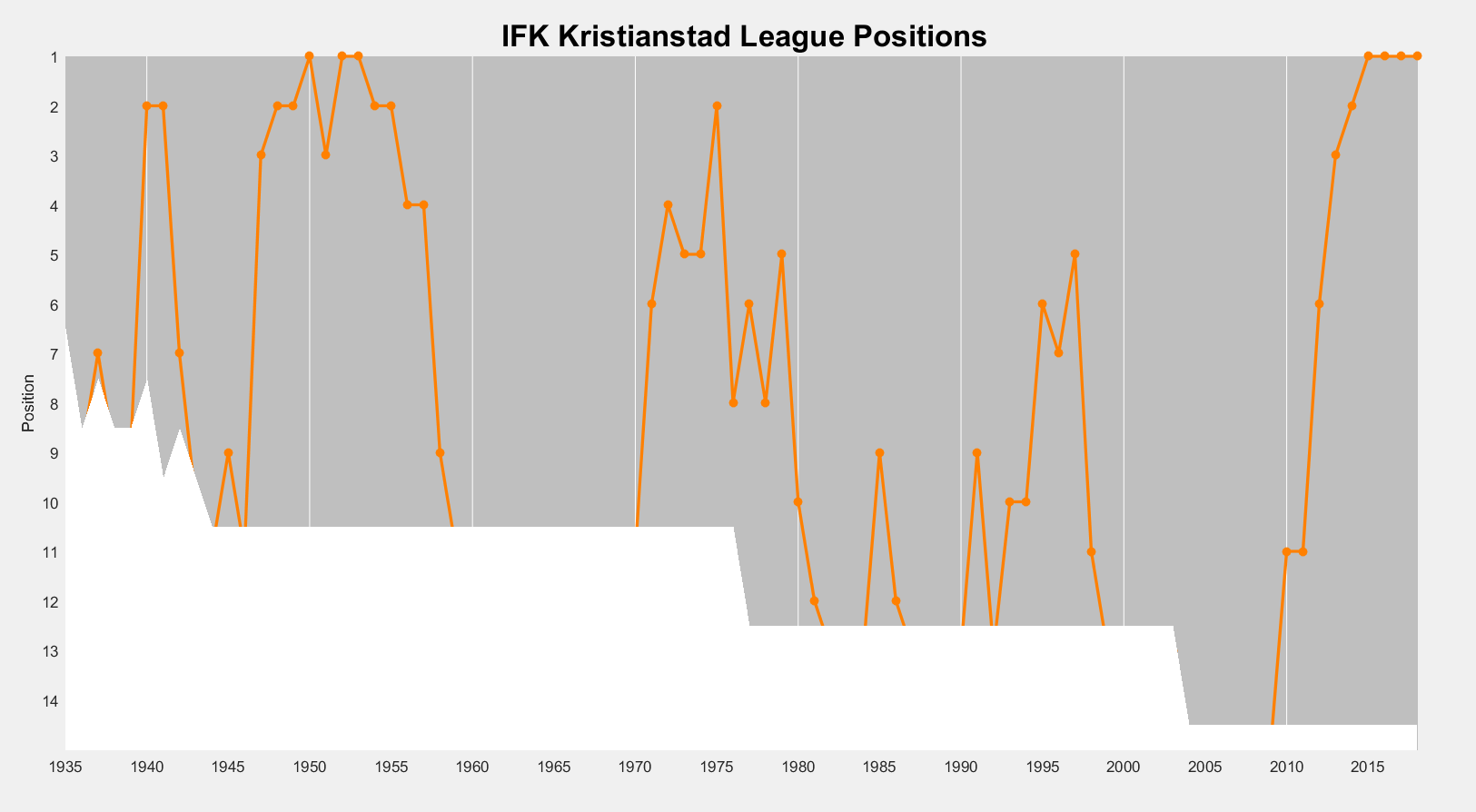
Kristianstad's positions in the top division from 1936 to 2018

Kristianstad's all-time top scorer in the top division is Bo Ahlberg, who scored 926 goals between 1971 and 1986. He also holds the club records for most goals in all divisions (1724 goals), most top-flight matches played (222) and most consecutive matches with a goal (97). Johan Jepson has played the most matches for the club in all divisions, playing over 350 matches from 2006 to 2016.

Four Kristianstad players have been the top scorer in the highest division: Åke Moberg in 1946–47, Carl-Erik Stockenberg for five consecutive seasons from the 1949–50 season to 1953–54, Ahlberg in 1975–76 and Lennarth Ebbinge in 1976–77.

Kristianstad's largest winning margin in the top flight is 22 goals in a 39–17 win against Guif in the 2017 quarter-finals. Their biggest win in any division was a 42–12 (30 goals) win against Uddevalla HK in 2004. The club's largest losing margin in the top division is 21 goals against Redbergslid in 1995 (20–41) and 1997 (22–43), whereas their heaviest defeat in any division was a 15–47 (32 goals) loss to Stavstens IF in 1999. In 2014–15, Kristianstad won 20 consecutive league matches, a record in the top division. Between March 2015 and March 2019, the team had 80 consecutive wins in home matches against domestic opposition.

== Players ==
=== Current squad ===
Squad for the 2023–24 season

Goalkeepers

- 1 (Denmark) Victor Bang
- 12 (Sweden) Gustaf Banke
- 16 (Sweden) Elias Karlsson

Wingers
LW

- 14 (Sweden) Albin Leyman
- 20 (Sweden) Emil Frend Öfors
- 48 (Sweden) Noah Martinsson

RW

- 30 (Sweden) Anton Halén
- 42 (Sweden) Albin Selin

Line players

- 25 (Sweden) Ludvig Jurmala Åström
- 46 (Sweden) Herman Josefsson

Back players
LB

- 4 (Sweden) Markus Olsson
- 6 (Sweden) Philip Henningsson
- 7 (Denmark) Victor Kløve

CB

- 10 (Denmark) Matias Helt Jepsen
- 37 (Sweden) Zoran Bozic

RB

- 5 (Sweden) Hampus Henningsson
- 9 (Sweden) Anton Hallbäck
- 34 (Sweden) Andreas Cederholm
- 49 (Sweden) Isaac Biel Nilsen

=== Transfers ===
Transfers for the 2026–27 season

Joining

- (Croatia) Niko Petrović (LP) from (Sweden) IFK Tumba Handboll
- (Sweden) Alexander Skoog (GK) from (Sweden) Västerås HF

Leaving

- (Denmark) Victor Bang (GK) to (Denmark) KIF Kolding
- (Sweden) Axel Månsson (CB) to (Denmark) Skjern Håndbold
- (Sweden) Elliot Stenmalm (LB) to (Sweden) Hammarby IF Handboll
- (Sweden) Herman Josefsson (LP) to (Hungary) Budai Farkasok KKUK

=== Transfer History ===
Transfers for the 2025–26 season

Joining

- (Sweden) Hayder Al-Khafadji (GK) from (Romania) CS Minaur Baia Mare
- (Sweden) William Höghielm (LP) from (Portugal) Sporting CP
- (Sweden) Liam Kjellman (RW) back from loan at (Sweden) Vinslövs HK

Leaving

- (Denmark) Sasser Sonn (LP) to (France) Pays d'Aix Université Club

Transfers for the 2024–25 season

Joining

- (Sweden) Axel Månsson (CB) (from (Sweden) Lugi HF)
- (Denmark) Sasser Sonn (LP) (from (Norway) Kristiansand Topphåndball)

Leaving

- (Sweden) Gustaf Banke (GK) (to (France) Pays d'Aix Université Club)
- (Denmark) Victor Kløve (LB) (end of loan (Denmark) Aalborg Håndbold)
- (Denmark) Matias Helt Jepsen (CB) (to (Denmark) HC Midtjylland)
- (Sweden) Ludvig Jurmala Åström (LP) (to (Germany) Frisch Auf Göppingen)

=== Player records ===
==== Most appearances ====
Name	Apps*	Years
Markus Olsson	235	2009–2015, 2020–
Bo Ahlberg	222	1971–1986
Åke Moberg	217	1944–1958
Johannes Larsson	212	2012–2019
(Iceland) Ólafur Guðmundsson	212	2012–2014, 2015–2021
Leo Larsson	205	2014–
Evert Sjunnesson	193	1940–1957
Bert Fridman	192	1970–1980
Johan Jepson	192	2009–2016
Åke Skough	187	1947–1958
Carl-Erik Stockenberg	184	1944–1956

==== All-time top goalscorers ====
Name	Goals*	Years
Markus Olsson	1036	2009–2015, 2020–
Bo Ahlberg	926	1971–1986
(Iceland) Ólafur Guðmundsson	791	2012–2014, 2015–2021
Carl-Erik Stockenberg	720	1944–1956
Åke Moberg	601	1944–1958
Lars-Göran Jönsson	582	1973–1979
Lars Olsson	563	1994–1997
Ulf Larsson	554	1980–1996
Lennarth Ebbinge	526	1976–1979, 1989–90
(Montenegro) Vlado Samardžić	473	1992–1997
Albin Lagergren	435	2013–2018
(Denmark) Lars Møller Madsen	401	2011–2014

* Only appearances and goals in the top division are included.

== Management ==
=== Organisation ===
As of 6 August 2018

Name	Role
Johan Cosmo	Chairman
Anna-Lena Lindahl	Vice chairman
Adam Tell	Commercial director
Jesper Larsson	Director of sport
Marcus Kjellman	Director
Susanne Olsson	Director
Ulf Kvist	Director
Anders Hallengren	Director

=== Technical ===
Name	Role
Jonas Wille	Head coach
Ulf Larsson	Assistant coach
Sofie Stjernberg	Physiotherapist
Ingemar Gannby	Physiotherapist/Masseur
Thomas Tyszkiewicz	Club doctor
Stefan Ljunglöf	Equipment manager
Jonas Carlström	Fitness coach
Patrick Karlsson	Team manager
Vickie Peolin	Health and diet coach
Johan Ekengren	Mental coach
Conny Jönsson	Youth coach

=== Notable coaches ===
This is a list of coaches who have won a Swedish Championship (SM) gold or silver, won the regular season or coached the team in five or more seasons.

Name	Years	Achievements	Notes
Eskil Gustafsson	1937–1945, 1947–1950	SM gold 1941, 1948; League winner 1949–50	Player-coach until 1944
Karl Fridlundh	1950–1958	SM gold 1952, 1952–53; SM silver 1951, 1953–54, 1954–55; League winner 1951–52, 1952–53	Player-coach, co-coach
Åke Moberg	1950–1958, 1962–1963	SM gold 1952, 1952–53; SM silver 1951, 1953–54, 1954–55; League winner 1951–52, 1952–53	Player-coach, co-coach until 1958
Evert Sjunnesson	1950–1962, 1963–1973, 1976–1977	SM gold 1952, 1952–53; SM silver 1951, 1953–54, 1954–55; League winner 1951–52, 1952–53	Player-coach until 1957, co-coach until 1958
Leif Rosenberg	1973–1975	SM silver 1974–75	
Ulf Larsson	1999–2003, 2004–2006, 2019	League winner 2018–19 (Note: After Vranjes had joined the club as permanent coach Larsson temporarily returned as caretaker-coach due to Vranjes being unavaibalble; the first place was secured during this time)	Caretaker coach in 2019
Kenneth Andersson	2007–2012		
Ola Lindgren	2012–2019	SM gold 2014–15, 2015–16, 2016–17, 2017–18; SM silver 2011–12, 2012–13; League winner 2014–15, 2015–16, 2016–17, 2017–18	
Ljubomir Vranjes	2019–2020	League winner 2018–19	

== Honours ==
=== Championships ===
- Swedish Champions
  - Winners (9): 1941, 1948, 1952, 1953, 2015, 2016, 2017, 2018, 2023, 2026
  - Runners-up (6): 1951, 1954, 1955, 1975, 2012, 2013

=== League ===
- Handbollsligan/Elitserien/Allsvenskan (first tier)
  - Winners (9): 1950, 1952, 1953, 2015, 2016, 2017, 2018, 2019, 2023
  - Runners-up (8): 1940, 1941, 1948, 1949, 1954, 1954, 1975, 2014
- Allsvenskan/Division 1/Division 2 (second tier)
  - Winners (10): 1936, 1938, 1939, 1944, 1946, 1970, 1983, 1984, 1990, 1992
  - Promoted (9): 1936, 1939, 1944, 1946, 1970, 1984, 1990, 1992, 2009

=== Cup ===
- Swedish Cup
  - Winners (1): 2023

== European record ==
Season	Competition	Round	Club	1st leg	2nd leg	Aggregate
2012–13	EHF Cup	Qualification stage	(Slovakia) Sporta Hlohovec	31–24	28–21	59–45
2012–13	EHF Cup	Qualification stage	(Sweden) Guif	24–22	23–26	47–48
2013–14	EHF Cup	Qualification stage	(Luxembourg) Handball Esch	32–19	30–28	62–47
2013–14	EHF Cup	Qualification stage	(Romania) SMD Bacău	40–25	23–27	63–52
2013–14	EHF Cup	Group stage				
2013–14	EHF Cup	Group stage	(Hungary) Pick Szeged	23–26	18–29	4th place
2013–14	EHF Cup	Group stage	(France) Nantes	23–27	23–25	4th place
2013–14	EHF Cup	Group stage	(Slovakia) Tatran Prešov	34–27	30–37	4th place
2014–15	EHF Cup	Qualification stage	(Greece) Diomidis Argous	30–19	30–17	60–36
2014–15	EHF Cup	Qualification stage	(Slovenia) Maribor Branik	25–26	36–24	61–50
2014–15	EHF Cup	Qualification stage	(Germany) HSV Hamburg	27–29	28–26	55–55 (a)
2015–16	EHF Champions League	Group stage	(Spain) Barcelona	24–31	32–34	7th place
2015–16	EHF Champions League	Group stage	(Poland) Vive Targi Kielce	35–35	27–35	7th place
2015–16	EHF Champions League	Group stage	(North Macedonia) Vardar	25–30	31–38	7th place
2015–16	EHF Champions League	Group stage	(Germany) Rhein-Neckar Löwen	32–29	20–29	7th place
2015–16	EHF Champions League	Group stage	(Hungary) Pick Szeged	32–34	28–35	7th place
2015–16	EHF Champions League	Group stage	(France) Montpellier	29–30	26–30	7th place
2015–16	EHF Champions League	Group stage	(Denmark) KIF Kolding København	33–26	30–21	7th place
2016–17	EHF Champions League	Group stage	(North Macedonia) Vardar	23–28	29–32	8th place
2016–17	EHF Champions League	Group stage	(Poland) Vive Tauron Kielce	29–25	28–38	8th place
2016–17	EHF Champions League	Group stage	(Hungary) Pick Szeged	21–29	28–33	8th place
2016–17	EHF Champions League	Group stage	(Germany) Rhein-Neckar Löwen	29–31	29–30	8th place
2016–17	EHF Champions League	Group stage	(Belarus) Meshkov Brest	29–29	27–32	8th place
2016–17	EHF Champions League	Group stage	(Croatia) Zagreb	29–22	23–26	8th place
2016–17	EHF Champions League	Group stage	(Slovenia) Celje	29–29	28–27	8th place
2017–18	EHF Champions League	Group stage	(North Macedonia) Vardar	23–26	15–31	6th place
2017–18	EHF Champions League	Group stage	(Spain) Barcelona	21–26	29–31	6th place
2017–18	EHF Champions League	Group stage	(France) Nantes	26–31	25–34	6th place
2017–18	EHF Champions League	Group stage	(Germany) Rhein-Neckar Löwen	22–35	29–32	6th place
2017–18	EHF Champions League	Group stage	(Hungary) Pick Szeged	33–32	27–36	6th place
2017–18	EHF Champions League	Group stage	(Poland) Wisła Płock	25–24	25–25	6th place
2017–18	EHF Champions League	Group stage	(Croatia) Zagreb	28–28	27–24	6th place
2017–18	EHF Champions League	Round of 16	(Germany) Flensburg-Handewitt	22–26	24–27	46–53
2018–19	EHF Champions League	Group stage	(Belarus) Meshkov Brest	30–32	23–32	8th place
2018–19	EHF Champions League	Group stage	(North Macedonia) RK Vardar	30–32	25–33	8th place
2018–19	EHF Champions League	Group stage	(Spain) Barça Lassa	25–44	26–43	8th place
2018–19	EHF Champions League	Group stage	(Poland) PGE Vive Kielce	33–34	31–33	8th place
2018–19	EHF Champions League	Group stage	(Germany) Rhein-Neckar Löwen	27–32	27–36	8th place
2018–19	EHF Champions League	Group stage	(France) Montpellier	29–29	31–30	8th place
2018–19	EHF Champions League	Group stage	(Hungary) Telekom Veszprém	32–29	27–36	8th place
2019–20	EHF Champions League	Group stage	(Denmark) GOG Håndbold	24–33	37–37	4th place
2019–20	EHF Champions League	Group stage	(Romania) CS Dinamo București	29–29	25–28	4th place
2019–20	EHF Champions League	Group stage	(Poland) Orlen Wisła Płock	24–20	29–36	4th place
2019–20	EHF Champions League	Group stage	(Switzerland) Kadetten Schaffhausen	24–24	29–26	4th place
2019–20	EHF Champions League	Group stage	(Russia) Chekhovskiye Medvedi	36–28	26–37	4th place
2020–21	EHF European League	Second qualifying round	(Poland) KS Azoty-Puławy	24–22	25–24	49–46
2020–21	EHF European League	Group stage	(Germany) Füchse Berlin	23–36	23–30	3rd place
2020–21	EHF European League	Group stage	(Romania) CS Dinamo București	31–22	29–28	3rd place
2020–21	EHF European League	Group stage	(France) USAM Nîmes Gard	30–30	25–24	3rd place
2020–21	EHF European League	Group stage	(Portugal) Sporting CP	27–32	26–27	3rd place
2020–21	EHF European League	Group stage	(Slovakia) HT Tatran Prešov	32–25	27–22	3rd place
2020–21	EHF European League	Last 16	(Spain) CB Ademar León	34–27	34–31	68–58
2020–21	EHF European League	Quarterfinals	(Germany) SC Magdeburg	28–34	31–39	59–73
2022–23	EHF European League	First qualifying round	(Slovenia) RK Trimo Trebnje	33–33	36–31	69–64
2022–23	EHF European League	Second qualifying round	(Denmark) Skanderborg-Aarhus	31–32	33–35	64–67
2023–24	EHF European League	Group stage	(France) HBC Nantes	27–31	27–31	4th place
2023–24	EHF European League	Group stage	(Germany) Rhein-Neckar Löwen	20–26	28–36	4th place
2023–24	EHF European League	Group stage	(Portugal) SL Benfica	27–31	33–36	4th place
2024–25	EHF European League	Qualification round	(Spain) Fraikin BM Granollers	29–32	28–30	57–62
2025–26	EHF European League	Group stage	(France) Fenix Toulouse	34–26	30–28	2nd place
2025–26	EHF European League	Group stage	(Croatia) MRK Sesvete	28–27	32–32	2nd place
2025–26	EHF European League	Group stage	(North Macedonia) HC Vardar 1961	32–31	30–35	2nd place
2025–26	EHF European League	Main round	(Germany) MT Melsungen	31–30	29–33	3rd place
2025–26	EHF European League	Main round	(Portugal) S.L. Benfica	34–38	30–22	3rd place
2025–26	EHF European League	Play-offs	(Croatia) RK Nexe	34–36	27–32	61–68
2026–27	EHF Champions League	Group stage	(Hungary) OTP Bank – Pick Szeged	31–42	26–31	4th place
2026–27	EHF Champions League	Group stage	(Portugal) Sporting CP	29–37	40–42	4th place
2026–27	EHF Champions League	Group stage	(Denmark) GOG	32–37	30–39	4th place
2026–27	EHF European League	Play-offs	(To be determined) TBD	–	–	–
