= Horst Käsler =

German handball player, coach, and author (1926–1987)

Horst Käsler (18 April 1926 – 17 December 1987) was a German handball player, coach, author, and university professor.

Käsler had his greatest success as a player in the 1950s. In 1955 he led the German national team to a world championship in field handball.

After his career as a player, he taught at the ′′West Berlin Teachers Training College′′ rising to the rank of full professor and chair of the Physical Education Department; he published several manuals on training tactics and conditioning for the game. On 1 October 1972, he succeeded Werner Vick as part-time coach of the West German national team, a position he held until 1974.

In memory of his achievements, a sports hall in Berlin-Schmargendorf was named for him. He was also awarded the Silbernes Lorbeerblatt.
