= Bernhard Kempa =

German handball player and tennis player (1920-2017)

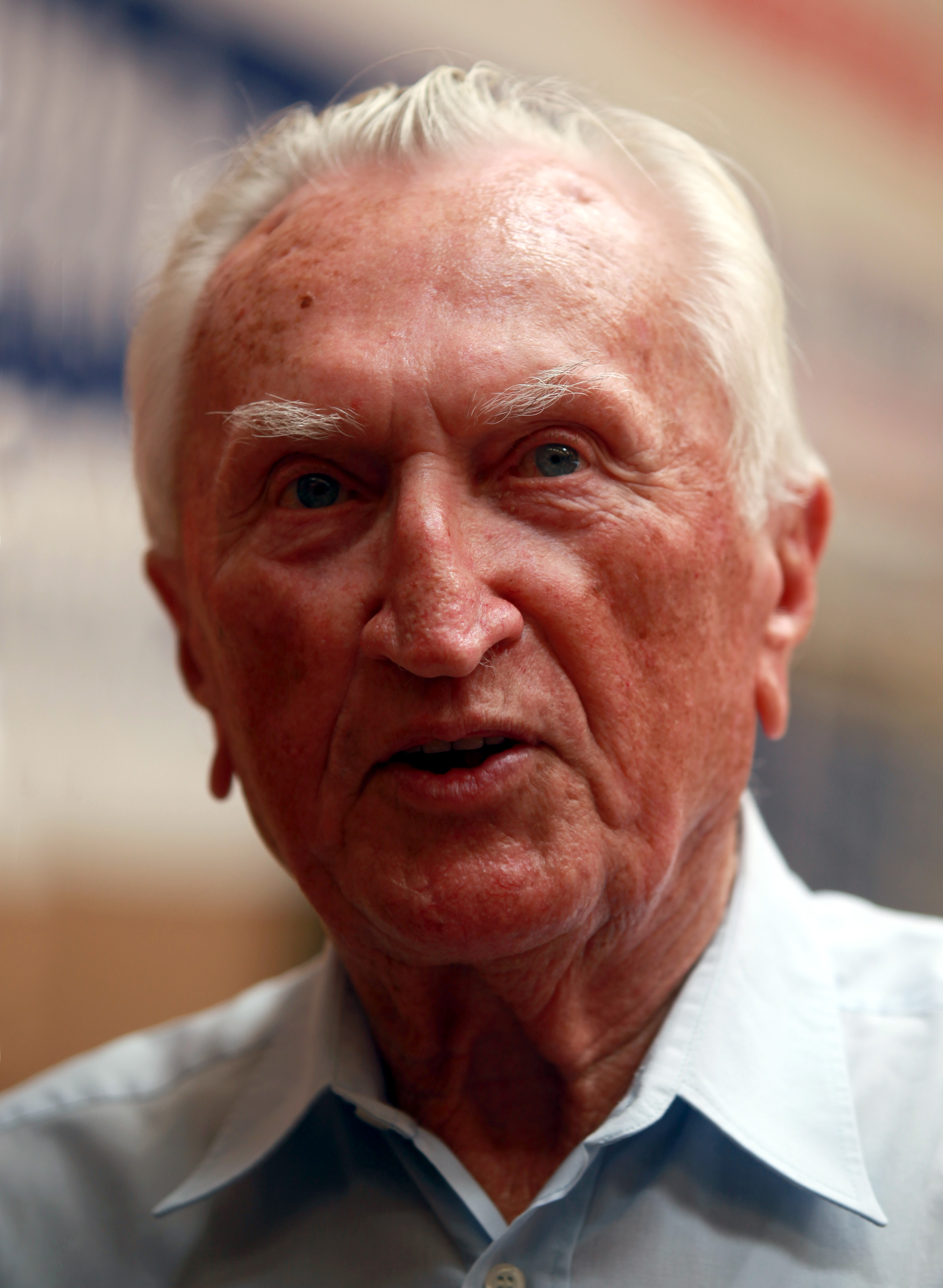
Kempa in August 2011

Bernhard Kempa (19 November 1920 – 20 July 2017) was a German handball player and coach. He was born in Oppeln, Upper Silesia (Opole, Poland). As a national team player, he became world champion in field handball in 1952 and 1955.

== Career ==
In the next few years, Frisch Auf Göppingen dominated the handball in Germany, as Kempa made a significant contribution as the outstanding player. Kempa won the German championship for Göppingen one more time in the hall (1955) and in the field (1957). As a Göppinger coach, he did so in the indoor handball five more times (1958–1961, 1970), and Kempa also took the Europapokal in 1960.

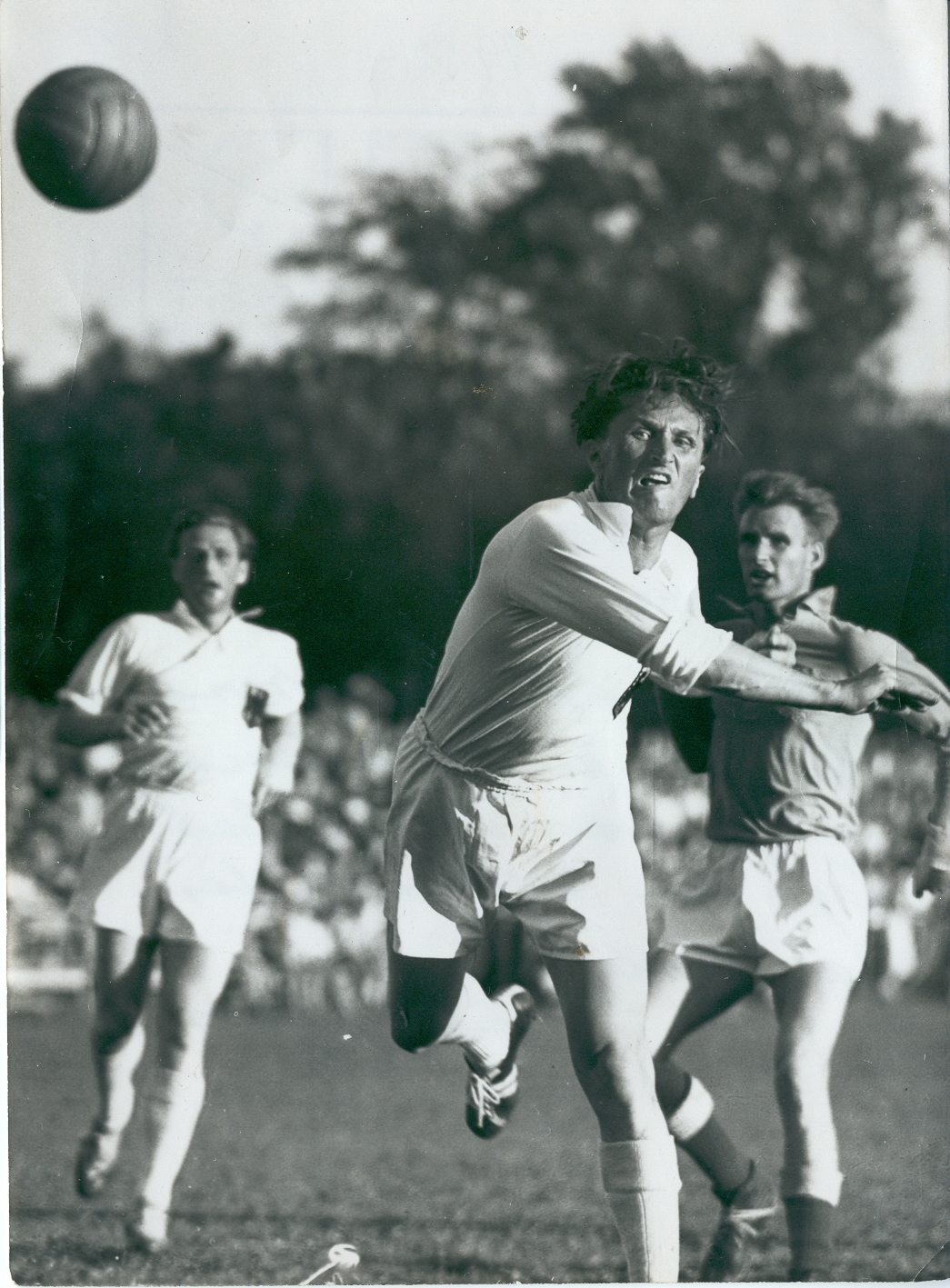
Kempa training in 1952

In the history books of handball he entered with his Kempa trick, a throwing combination, in which a player is played as he jumps into the circle; the player who crosses the circle catches the ball in the air and still throws during the jump on the goal.

According to Kempa is also the sports article brand Kempa under which Uhlsport sports articles distributed around the handball sport.

== Honors ==
In 2011, Bernhard Kempa was admitted to Germany's Sports Hall of Fame.

== Death ==
Kempa died in Bad Boll, Germany on 20 July 2017 at the age of 96.
