= 2014–15 EHF Cup group stage =

The 2014–15 EHF Cup group stage, corresponding to the fourth round of the 2014–15 EHF Cup, will be played from 11 February to 22 March 2015.

== Format ==
Sixteen teams, advancing from the third round, were drawn into four groups of four teams. In each group, teams play each other in a double round-robin system with home-and-away matches. Group winners and runners-up teams will advance to the knockout stage.

== Seedings ==
The seedings were published on 3 December 2014, and the draw took place on the following day at 11:00 local time, in Vienna, Austria.

Pot 1
(Germany) HSV Hamburg
(Germany) MT Melsungen
(Portugal) Porto
(Romania) HCM Constanța

Pot 2
(Spain) Fraikin Granollers
(Hungary) Balatonfüred
(Norway) Haslum HK
(Serbia) Vojvodina

Pot 3
(Germany) Füchse Berlin
(Russia) St. Petersburg
(Slovenia) Gorenje
(Sweden) Eskilstuna Guif

Pot 4
(Croatia) Nexe Našice
(Denmark) Skjern
(Denmark) Tvis Holstebro
(Switzerland) Pfadi Winterthur

Notes

1. ^{ECL QS} Losers from the qualification tournaments.

== Group A ==
Pos	Team	Pld	W	D	L	GF	GA	GD	Pts	Qualification
1	(Germany) HSV Hamburg (A)	6	5	0	1	189	169	+20	10	Advance to knockout stage
2	(Slovenia) Gorenje (A)	6	4	0	2	192	160	+32	8	Advance to knockout stage
3	(Norway) Haslum HK (E)	6	2	0	4	160	194	−34	4	
4	(Switzerland) Pfadi Winterthur (E)	6	1	0	5	160	178	−18	2	

Updated to match(es) played on 21 March 2015. Source: EHF
Rules for classification: Group stage tiebreakers
(A) Advance to a further round; (E) Eliminated

11 February 2015; 18:30	HSV Hamburg (Germany)	33–28	(Slovenia) Gorenje	Alsterdorfer Sporthalle, Hamburg; Attendance: 1,589; Referees: Pichon, Reveret (FRA)
11 February 2015; 18:30	Lindberg, Pfahl 7	(15–14)	Šoštarič 7	Alsterdorfer Sporthalle, Hamburg; Attendance: 1,589; Referees: Pichon, Reveret (FRA)
11 February 2015; 18:30	3× (yellow card) 5× (suspension)	Report	2× (yellow card) 9× (suspension) 1× (red card)	Alsterdorfer Sporthalle, Hamburg; Attendance: 1,589; Referees: Pichon, Reveret (FRA)

14 February 2015; 16:15	Haslum HK (Norway)	23–27	(Switzerland) Pfadi Winterthur	Nadderud Arena, Bekkestua; Attendance: 808; Referees: Vitaku, Vitaku (Kosovo)
14 February 2015; 16:15	Brännberger 5	(12–13)	Krieg 11	Nadderud Arena, Bekkestua; Attendance: 808; Referees: Vitaku, Vitaku (Kosovo)
14 February 2015; 16:15	3× (yellow card) 2× (suspension)	Report	3× (yellow card) 4× (suspension)	Nadderud Arena, Bekkestua; Attendance: 808; Referees: Vitaku, Vitaku (Kosovo)

18 February 2015; 20:00	Pfadi Winterthur (Switzerland)	22–26	(Germany) HSV Hamburg	Eulachhalle, Winterthur; Attendance: 1,500; Referees: Katsikis, Michailidis (GRE)
18 February 2015; 20:00	Krieg 6	(9–14)	Pfahl 5	Eulachhalle, Winterthur; Attendance: 1,500; Referees: Katsikis, Michailidis (GRE)
18 February 2015; 20:00	3× (yellow card) 4× (suspension)	Report	3× (yellow card) 1× (suspension)	Eulachhalle, Winterthur; Attendance: 1,500; Referees: Katsikis, Michailidis (GRE)

21 February 2015; 20:30	Gorenje (Slovenia)	34–21	(Norway) Haslum HK	Rdeča dvorana, Velenje; Attendance: 1,000; Referees: Laitinen, Korja (FIN)
21 February 2015; 20:30	Skube 9	(18–13)	Roe 6	Rdeča dvorana, Velenje; Attendance: 1,000; Referees: Laitinen, Korja (FIN)
21 February 2015; 20:30	3× (yellow card) 2× (suspension)	Report	3× (yellow card) 3× (suspension)	Rdeča dvorana, Velenje; Attendance: 1,000; Referees: Laitinen, Korja (FIN)

28 February 2015; 19:30	Pfadi Winterthur (Switzerland)	26–35	(Slovenia) Gorenje	Eulachhalle, Winterthur; Attendance: 1,000; Referees: Cohen, Peretz (ISR)
28 February 2015; 19:30	Jud 6	(12–16)	Skube 12	Eulachhalle, Winterthur; Attendance: 1,000; Referees: Cohen, Peretz (ISR)
28 February 2015; 19:30	3× (yellow card) 5× (suspension)	Report	3× (yellow card) 3× (suspension)	Eulachhalle, Winterthur; Attendance: 1,000; Referees: Cohen, Peretz (ISR)

1 March 2015; 16:15	Haslum HK (Norway)	34–32	(Germany) HSV Hamburg	Nadderud Arena, Bekkestua; Attendance: 807; Referees: Accoto Martins, Accoto Martins (POR)
1 March 2015; 16:15	Roe 7	(17–16)	Șimicu 8	Nadderud Arena, Bekkestua; Attendance: 807; Referees: Accoto Martins, Accoto Martins (POR)
1 March 2015; 16:15	3× (yellow card) 5× (suspension)	Report	3× (yellow card) 3× (suspension)	Nadderud Arena, Bekkestua; Attendance: 807; Referees: Accoto Martins, Accoto Martins (POR)

7 March 2015; 15:30	HSV Hamburg (Germany)	36–26	(Norway) Haslum HK	Alsterdorfer Sporthalle, Hamburg; Attendance: 1,623; Referees: Kekes, Kekes (HUN)
7 March 2015; 15:30	Lindberg 8	(17–8)	Brännberger 6	Alsterdorfer Sporthalle, Hamburg; Attendance: 1,623; Referees: Kekes, Kekes (HUN)
7 March 2015; 15:30	2× (yellow card) 3× (suspension)	Report	3× (yellow card) 4× (suspension)	Alsterdorfer Sporthalle, Hamburg; Attendance: 1,623; Referees: Kekes, Kekes (HUN)

8 March 2015; 19:00	Gorenje (Slovenia)	30–26	(Switzerland) Pfadi Winterthur	Rdeča dvorana, Velenje; Attendance: 1,000; Referees: Luque Cabrejas, Pascual Sanchez (ESP)
8 March 2015; 19:00	Medved, Skube 6	(15–11)	Jud 7	Rdeča dvorana, Velenje; Attendance: 1,000; Referees: Luque Cabrejas, Pascual Sanchez (ESP)
8 March 2015; 19:00	3× (yellow card) 6× (suspension)	Report	3× (yellow card) 5× (suspension)	Rdeča dvorana, Velenje; Attendance: 1,000; Referees: Luque Cabrejas, Pascual Sanchez (ESP)

14 March 2015; 19:30	Pfadi Winterthur (Switzerland)	31–34	(Norway) Haslum HK	Eulachhalle, Winterthur; Attendance: 850; Referees: Vešović, Mitrović (MNE)
14 March 2015; 19:30	Hess, Krieg 7	(15–17)	Mamelund 8	Eulachhalle, Winterthur; Attendance: 850; Referees: Vešović, Mitrović (MNE)
14 March 2015; 19:30	3× (yellow card) 3× (suspension)	Report	3× (yellow card) 3× (suspension)	Eulachhalle, Winterthur; Attendance: 850; Referees: Vešović, Mitrović (MNE)

14 March 2015; 20:30	Gorenje (Slovenia)	31–32	(Germany) HSV Hamburg	Rdeča dvorana, Velenje; Attendance: 1,200; Referees: Olesen, Pedersen (DEN)
14 March 2015; 20:30	Skube 10	(15–13)	Șimicu 8	Rdeča dvorana, Velenje; Attendance: 1,200; Referees: Olesen, Pedersen (DEN)
14 March 2015; 20:30	3× (yellow card) 6× (suspension)	Report	3× (yellow card) 6× (suspension) 1× (red card)	Rdeča dvorana, Velenje; Attendance: 1,200; Referees: Olesen, Pedersen (DEN)

18 March 2015; 19:30	HSV Hamburg (Germany)	30–28	(Switzerland) Pfadi Winterthur	Alsterdorfer Sporthalle, Hamburg; Attendance: 1,226; Referees: Engkebølle, Kaerlund (DEN)
18 March 2015; 19:30	Mahé 11	(12–13)	Hess 6	Alsterdorfer Sporthalle, Hamburg; Attendance: 1,226; Referees: Engkebølle, Kaerlund (DEN)
18 March 2015; 19:30	3× (yellow card) 2× (suspension)	Report	3× (yellow card) 4× (suspension)	Alsterdorfer Sporthalle, Hamburg; Attendance: 1,226; Referees: Engkebølle, Kaerlund (DEN)

21 March 2015; 16:15	Haslum HK (Norway)	22–34	(Slovenia) Gorenje	Nadderud Arena, Bekkestua; Attendance: 466; Referees: Sigurjónsson, Petursson (ISL)
21 March 2015; 16:15	Roe 7	(11–17)	Šoštarič 9	Nadderud Arena, Bekkestua; Attendance: 466; Referees: Sigurjónsson, Petursson (ISL)
21 March 2015; 16:15	3× (yellow card) 5× (suspension) 1× (red card)	Report	3× (yellow card) 6× (suspension)	Nadderud Arena, Bekkestua; Attendance: 466; Referees: Sigurjónsson, Petursson (ISL)

== Group B ==
Pos	Team	Pld	W	D	L	GF	GA	GD	Pts	Qualification
1	(Denmark) Tvis Holstebro (A)	6	4	2	0	185	168	+17	10	Advance to knockout stage
2	(Spain) Fraikin Granollers (E)	6	3	1	2	159	154	+5	7	
3	(Romania) HCM Constanța (E)	6	1	2	3	163	178	−15	4	
4	(Russia) St. Petersburg (E)	6	1	1	4	162	169	−7	3	

Updated to match(es) played on 22 March 2015. Source: EHF
Rules for classification: Group stage tiebreakers
(A) Advance to a further round; (E) Eliminated

14 February 2015; 16:15	Fraikin Granollers (Spain)	28–28	(Denmark) Tvis Holstebro	Palau d'Esports, Granollers; Attendance: 1,200; Referees: Mitrevski, Todorovski (MKD)
14 February 2015; 16:15	Ruiz 10	(12–17)	Larsen 7	Palau d'Esports, Granollers; Attendance: 1,200; Referees: Mitrevski, Todorovski (MKD)
14 February 2015; 16:15	3× (yellow card) 2× (suspension)	Report	3× (yellow card) 6× (suspension)	Palau d'Esports, Granollers; Attendance: 1,200; Referees: Mitrevski, Todorovski (MKD)

15 February 2015; 11:45	Constanța (Romania)	25–25	(Russia) St. Petersburg	Sala Sporturilor, Constanța; Attendance: 1,900; Referees: Baranowski, Lemanowicz (POL)
15 February 2015; 11:45	Cutura 10	(13–10)	Kovalenko 6	Sala Sporturilor, Constanța; Attendance: 1,900; Referees: Baranowski, Lemanowicz (POL)
15 February 2015; 11:45	3× (yellow card) 4× (suspension)	Report	3× (yellow card) 5× (suspension)	Sala Sporturilor, Constanța; Attendance: 1,900; Referees: Baranowski, Lemanowicz (POL)

21 February 2015; 15:00	Tvis Holstebro (Denmark)	34–28	(Romania) HCM Constanța	Idrætscenter Vest, Holstebro; Attendance: 1,285; Referees: Kouz, Zhoba (UKR)
21 February 2015; 15:00	M. Nielsen 10	(17–16)	Cutura 9	Idrætscenter Vest, Holstebro; Attendance: 1,285; Referees: Kouz, Zhoba (UKR)
21 February 2015; 15:00	3× (yellow card) 7× (suspension)	Report	3× (yellow card) 4× (suspension)	Idrætscenter Vest, Holstebro; Attendance: 1,285; Referees: Kouz, Zhoba (UKR)

22 February 2015; 15:00	St. Petersburg (Russia)	22–27	(Spain) Fraikin Granollers	Yubileyny Sports Palace, Saint Petersburg; Attendance: 1,700; Referees: Baumgart, Wild (GER)
22 February 2015; 15:00	Dryapochko, Junisbekov 6	(6–14)	Resina, Solé 5	Yubileyny Sports Palace, Saint Petersburg; Attendance: 1,700; Referees: Baumgart, Wild (GER)
22 February 2015; 15:00	3× (yellow card) 4× (suspension)	Report	2× (yellow card) 1× (suspension)	Yubileyny Sports Palace, Saint Petersburg; Attendance: 1,700; Referees: Baumgart, Wild (GER)

28 February 2015; 16:00	Fraikin Granollers (Spain)	23–21	(Romania) HCM Constanța	Palau d'Esports, Granollers; Attendance: 1,300; Referees: Nikolic, Stojkovic (SRB)
28 February 2015; 16:00	del Arco, Resina 5	(12–10)	Buricea 6	Palau d'Esports, Granollers; Attendance: 1,300; Referees: Nikolic, Stojkovic (SRB)
28 February 2015; 16:00	2× (yellow card) 2× (suspension)	Report	2× (yellow card) 8× (suspension) 1× (red card)	Palau d'Esports, Granollers; Attendance: 1,300; Referees: Nikolic, Stojkovic (SRB)

28 February 2015; 19:15	Tvis Holstebro (Denmark)	28–24	(Russia) St. Petersburg	Idrætscenter Vest, Holstebro; Attendance: 740; Referees: Fleisch, Rieber (GER)
28 February 2015; 19:15	M. Nielsen 9	(16–13)	Dryapochko 8	Idrætscenter Vest, Holstebro; Attendance: 740; Referees: Fleisch, Rieber (GER)
28 February 2015; 19:15	3× (yellow card) 3× (suspension)	Report	3× (yellow card) 3× (suspension)	Idrætscenter Vest, Holstebro; Attendance: 740; Referees: Fleisch, Rieber (GER)

8 March 2015; 11:45	Constanța (Romania)	28–27	(Spain) Fraikin Granollers	Sala Sporturilor, Constanța; Attendance: 2,845; Referees: Cindric, Gonzurek (CRO)
8 March 2015; 11:45	three players 7	(14–11)	del Arco 8	Sala Sporturilor, Constanța; Attendance: 2,845; Referees: Cindric, Gonzurek (CRO)
8 March 2015; 11:45	3× (yellow card) 2× (suspension)	Report	2× (yellow card) 3× (suspension)	Sala Sporturilor, Constanța; Attendance: 2,845; Referees: Cindric, Gonzurek (CRO)

9 March 2015; 19:00	St. Petersburg (Russia)	30–32	(Denmark) Tvis Holstebro	Yubileyny Sports Palace, Saint Petersburg; Attendance: 1,000; Referees: Herczeg, Südi (HUN)
9 March 2015; 19:00	Nasyrov 7	(12–14)	M. Nielsen 12	Yubileyny Sports Palace, Saint Petersburg; Attendance: 1,000; Referees: Herczeg, Südi (HUN)
9 March 2015; 19:00	3× (yellow card) 4× (suspension) 1× (red card)	Report	2× (yellow card) 7× (suspension)	Yubileyny Sports Palace, Saint Petersburg; Attendance: 1,000; Referees: Herczeg, Südi (HUN)

14 March 2015; 15:00	Tvis Holstebro (Denmark)	29–24	(Spain) Fraikin Granollers	Idrætscenter Vest, Holstebro; Attendance: 1,223; Referees: Brunner, Salah (SUI)
14 March 2015; 15:00	Larsen, A. Nielsen 6	(13–13)	Ruiz 7	Idrætscenter Vest, Holstebro; Attendance: 1,223; Referees: Brunner, Salah (SUI)
14 March 2015; 15:00	3× (yellow card) 7× (suspension) 1× (red card)	Report	3× (yellow card) 4× (suspension)	Idrætscenter Vest, Holstebro; Attendance: 1,223; Referees: Brunner, Salah (SUI)

16 March 2015; 19:00	St. Petersburg (Russia)	35–27	(Romania) Constanța	Yubileyny Sports Palace, Saint Petersburg; Attendance: 600; Referees: Gasmi, Gasmi (FRA)
16 March 2015; 19:00	Dryapochko 10	(15–13)	Cutura 7	Yubileyny Sports Palace, Saint Petersburg; Attendance: 600; Referees: Gasmi, Gasmi (FRA)
16 March 2015; 19:00	2× (yellow card) 7× (suspension) 1× (red card)	Report	3× (yellow card) 7× (suspension) 1× (red card)	Yubileyny Sports Palace, Saint Petersburg; Attendance: 600; Referees: Gasmi, Gasmi (FRA)

21 March 2015; 16:15	Fraikin Granollers (Spain)	30–26	(Russia) St. Petersburg	Palau d'Esports, Granollers; Attendance: 1,300; Referees: Leandersson, Lindroos (FIN)
21 March 2015; 16:15	del Arco 7	(13–13)	Kungurov 7	Palau d'Esports, Granollers; Attendance: 1,300; Referees: Leandersson, Lindroos (FIN)
21 March 2015; 16:15	2× (yellow card) 3× (suspension)		3× (yellow card) 5× (suspension)	Palau d'Esports, Granollers; Attendance: 1,300; Referees: Leandersson, Lindroos (FIN)

22 March 2015; 11:45	Constanța (Romania)	34–34	(Denmark) Tvis Holstebro	Sala Sporturilor, Constanța; Attendance: 1,000; Referees: Mykolaitis, Sniurevicius (LTU)
22 March 2015; 11:45	Toma 11	(21–15)	Larholm, Larsen 6	Sala Sporturilor, Constanța; Attendance: 1,000; Referees: Mykolaitis, Sniurevicius (LTU)
22 March 2015; 11:45	3× (yellow card) 3× (suspension)	Report	3× (yellow card) 8× (suspension)	Sala Sporturilor, Constanța; Attendance: 1,000; Referees: Mykolaitis, Sniurevicius (LTU)

== Group C ==
Pos	Team	Pld	W	D	L	GF	GA	GD	Pts	Qualification
1	(Germany) Füchse Berlin (A)	6	5	0	1	175	143	+32	10	Advance to knockout stage
2	(Denmark) Skjern (A)	6	5	0	1	164	147	+17	10	Advance to knockout stage
3	(Portugal) Porto (E)	6	2	0	4	142	152	−10	4	
4	(Serbia) Vojvodina (E)	6	0	0	6	143	182	−39	0	

Updated to match(es) played on 21 March 2015. Source: EHF
Rules for classification: Group stage tiebreakers
(A) Advance to a further round; (E) Eliminated

14 February 2015; 18:00 WET	Porto (Portugal)	20–26	(Germany) Füchse Berlin	Dragão Caixa, Porto; Attendance: 1,209; Referees: Cvetko, Kavalar (SLO)
14 February 2015; 18:00 WET	Duarte, Ferraz 4	(12–14)	Nenadić 6	Dragão Caixa, Porto; Attendance: 1,209; Referees: Cvetko, Kavalar (SLO)
14 February 2015; 18:00 WET	3× (yellow card) 2× (suspension)	Report	2× (yellow card) 1× (suspension)	Dragão Caixa, Porto; Attendance: 1,209; Referees: Cvetko, Kavalar (SLO)

15 February 2015; 20:15 CET	Vojvodina (Serbia)	23–25	(Denmark) Skjern	SPC Vojvodina, Novi Sad; Attendance: 1,500; Referees: Bounouara, Sami (FRA)
15 February 2015; 20:15 CET	Elezović 8	(14–13)	Klitgaard, Markussen 5	SPC Vojvodina, Novi Sad; Attendance: 1,500; Referees: Bounouara, Sami (FRA)
15 February 2015; 20:15 CET	3× (yellow card) 4× (suspension)	Report	3× (yellow card) 2× (suspension) 1× (red card)	SPC Vojvodina, Novi Sad; Attendance: 1,500; Referees: Bounouara, Sami (FRA)

22 February 2015; 15:00 CET	Skjern (Denmark)	27–21	(Portugal) Porto	Skjern Bank Arena, Skjern; Attendance: 1,315; Referees: Sager, Styger (SUI)
22 February 2015; 15:00 CET	Søndergaard 7	(13–11)	Ferraz, Moreira 6	Skjern Bank Arena, Skjern; Attendance: 1,315; Referees: Sager, Styger (SUI)
22 February 2015; 15:00 CET	2× (yellow card) 5× (suspension)	Report	3× (yellow card) 4× (suspension)	Skjern Bank Arena, Skjern; Attendance: 1,315; Referees: Sager, Styger (SUI)

22 February 2015; 17:15 CET	Füchse Berlin (Germany)	37–22	(Serbia) Vojvodina	Max-Schmeling-Halle, Berlin; Attendance: 6,453; Referees: Krkacev, Kolevski (MKD)
22 February 2015; 17:15 CET	Horak 8	(18–11)	Elezovic 7	Max-Schmeling-Halle, Berlin; Attendance: 6,453; Referees: Krkacev, Kolevski (MKD)
22 February 2015; 17:15 CET	3× (yellow card) 2× (suspension)	Report	3× (yellow card) 3× (suspension)	Max-Schmeling-Halle, Berlin; Attendance: 6,453; Referees: Krkacev, Kolevski (MKD)

28 February 2015; 15:00 CET	Skjern (Denmark)	32–28	(Germany) Füchse Berlin	Skjern Bank Arena, Skjern; Attendance: 1,575; Referees: Gubica, Milosevic (CRO)
28 February 2015; 15:00 CET	Møllgaard 9	(17–12)	Petersen 7	Skjern Bank Arena, Skjern; Attendance: 1,575; Referees: Gubica, Milosevic (CRO)
28 February 2015; 15:00 CET	2× (yellow card) 2× (suspension)	Report	3× (yellow card) 2× (suspension)	Skjern Bank Arena, Skjern; Attendance: 1,575; Referees: Gubica, Milosevic (CRO)

1 March 2015; 20:15 CET	Vojvodina (Serbia)	27–29	(Portugal) Porto	SPC Vojvodina, Novi Sad; Attendance: 1,578; Referees: Erdogan, Özdeniz (TUR)
1 March 2015; 20:15 CET	Elezović, Stanković 6	(13–15)	Duarte 7	SPC Vojvodina, Novi Sad; Attendance: 1,578; Referees: Erdogan, Özdeniz (TUR)
1 March 2015; 20:15 CET	3× (yellow card) 5× (suspension)	Report	2× (yellow card) 3× (suspension)	SPC Vojvodina, Novi Sad; Attendance: 1,578; Referees: Erdogan, Özdeniz (TUR)

7 March 2015; 18:00 WET	Porto (Portugal)	29–23	(Serbia) Vojvodina	Dragão Caixa, Porto; Attendance: 1,401; Referees: Skruzny, Kavulic (CZE)
7 March 2015; 18:00 WET	Ferraz, Moreira 7	(13–12)	Nikolić 7	Dragão Caixa, Porto; Attendance: 1,401; Referees: Skruzny, Kavulic (CZE)
7 March 2015; 18:00 WET	3× (yellow card) 6× (suspension)	Report	3× (yellow card) 7× (suspension)	Dragão Caixa, Porto; Attendance: 1,401; Referees: Skruzny, Kavulic (CZE)

8 March 2015; 17:15 CET	Füchse Berlin (Germany)	29–24	(Norway) Skjern	Max-Schmeling-Halle, Berlin; Attendance: 4,915; Referees: Brkic, Jusufhodzic (AUT)
8 March 2015; 17:15 CET	Nenadić, Petersen 6	(14–14)	Christensen, Møllgaard 6	Max-Schmeling-Halle, Berlin; Attendance: 4,915; Referees: Brkic, Jusufhodzic (AUT)
8 March 2015; 17:15 CET	3× (yellow card) 1× (suspension)	Report	3× (yellow card) 5× (suspension)	Max-Schmeling-Halle, Berlin; Attendance: 4,915; Referees: Brkic, Jusufhodzic (AUT)

14 March 2015; 19:30 CET	Skjern (Denmark)	32–23	(Serbia) Vojvodina	Skjern Bank Arena, Skjern; Attendance: 1,024; Referees: Laitinen, Korja (FIN)
14 March 2015; 19:30 CET	Markussen, Møllgaard 5	(14–9)	three players 4	Skjern Bank Arena, Skjern; Attendance: 1,024; Referees: Laitinen, Korja (FIN)
14 March 2015; 19:30 CET	3× (yellow card) 4× (suspension)	Report	3× (yellow card) 4× (suspension)	Skjern Bank Arena, Skjern; Attendance: 1,024; Referees: Laitinen, Korja (FIN)

15 March 2015; 17:15 CET	Füchse Berlin (Germany)	25–20	(Portugal) Porto	Max-Schmeling-Halle, Berlin; Attendance: 6,316; Referees: Bol, Van Eck (NED)
15 March 2015; 17:15 CET	Wiede 6	(7–8)	Ferraz 5	Max-Schmeling-Halle, Berlin; Attendance: 6,316; Referees: Bol, Van Eck (NED)
15 March 2015; 17:15 CET	3× (yellow card) 3× (suspension)	Report	3× (yellow card) 4× (suspension)	Max-Schmeling-Halle, Berlin; Attendance: 6,316; Referees: Bol, Van Eck (NED)

21 March 2015; 18:00 WET	Porto (Portugal)	23–24	(Norway) Skjern	Dragão Caixa, Porto; Attendance: 805; Referees: Bounouara, Sami (FRA)
21 March 2015; 18:00 WET	Amador Salina, Moreira 6	(13–14)	Markussen 7	Dragão Caixa, Porto; Attendance: 805; Referees: Bounouara, Sami (FRA)
21 March 2015; 18:00 WET	3× (yellow card) 5× (suspension)	Report	2× (yellow card) 7× (suspension)	Dragão Caixa, Porto; Attendance: 805; Referees: Bounouara, Sami (FRA)

21 March 2015; 18:00 CET	Vojvodina (Serbia)	25–30	(Germany) Füchse Berlin	SPC Vojvodina, Novi Sad; Attendance: 1,200; Referees: Kaveshnikov, Plotnikov (RUS)
21 March 2015; 18:00 CET	Elezović 9	(11–17)	Igropulo 7	SPC Vojvodina, Novi Sad; Attendance: 1,200; Referees: Kaveshnikov, Plotnikov (RUS)
21 March 2015; 18:00 CET	3× (yellow card)	Report	3× (yellow card) 4× (suspension)	SPC Vojvodina, Novi Sad; Attendance: 1,200; Referees: Kaveshnikov, Plotnikov (RUS)

== Group D ==
Pos	Team	Pld	W	D	L	GF	GA	GD	Pts	Qualification
1	(Germany) MT Melsungen (A)	6	5	0	1	177	152	+25	10	Advance to knockout stage
2	(Sweden) Eskilstuna Guif (A)	6	3	2	1	165	156	+9	8	Advance to knockout stage
3	(Croatia) Nexe Našice (E)	6	1	1	4	161	170	−9	3	
4	(Hungary) Balatonfüred (E)	6	1	1	4	140	165	−25	3	

Updated to match(es) played on 21 March 2015. Source: EHF
Rules for classification: Group stage tiebreakers
(A) Advance to a further round; (E) Eliminated

13 February 2015; 20:00	Balatonfüred (Hungary)	19–31	(Croatia) Nexe Našice	Veszprém Aréna, Veszprém; Attendance: 1,200; Referees: Covalciuc, Covalciuc (MDA)
13 February 2015; 20:00	Bánhidi, 5	(8–13)	Božić Pavletić, Çelebi 5	Veszprém Aréna, Veszprém; Attendance: 1,200; Referees: Covalciuc, Covalciuc (MDA)
13 February 2015; 20:00	2× (yellow card) 4× (suspension)	Report	3× (yellow card) 5× (suspension)	Veszprém Aréna, Veszprém; Attendance: 1,200; Referees: Covalciuc, Covalciuc (MDA)

14 February 2015; 19:00	MT Melsungen (Germany)	31–27	(Sweden) Eskilstuna Guif	Rothenbach-Halle, Kassel; Attendance: 2,136; Referees: Engkebølle, Kaerlund (DEN)
14 February 2015; 19:00	Fahlgren 7	(16–14)	Östlund, Tholin 6	Rothenbach-Halle, Kassel; Attendance: 2,136; Referees: Engkebølle, Kaerlund (DEN)
14 February 2015; 19:00	3× (yellow card) 1× (suspension)	Report	3× (yellow card) 2× (suspension)	Rothenbach-Halle, Kassel; Attendance: 2,136; Referees: Engkebølle, Kaerlund (DEN)

21 February 2015; 16:00	Eskilstuna Guif (Sweden)	24–24	(Hungary) Balatonfüred	Eskilstuna Sporthall, Eskilstuna; Attendance: 686; Referees: Vesovic, Mitrovic (MNE)
21 February 2015; 16:00	Tholin 7	(13–11)	three players 4	Eskilstuna Sporthall, Eskilstuna; Attendance: 686; Referees: Vesovic, Mitrovic (MNE)
21 February 2015; 16:00	3× (yellow card) 3× (suspension)	Report	3× (yellow card) 7× (suspension) 1× (red card)	Eskilstuna Sporthall, Eskilstuna; Attendance: 686; Referees: Vesovic, Mitrovic (MNE)

21 February 2015; 19:00	Nexe Našice (Croatia)	25–28	(Germany) MT Melsungen	Sportska dvorana kralja Tomislava, Našice; Attendance: 2,000; Referees: Kiyashko, Kiselev (RUS)
21 February 2015; 19:00	Sakic 6	(12–13)	Allendorf, Sellin 6	Sportska dvorana kralja Tomislava, Našice; Attendance: 2,000; Referees: Kiyashko, Kiselev (RUS)
21 February 2015; 19:00	3× (yellow card) 5× (suspension)	Report	2× (yellow card) 4× (suspension) 1× (red card)	Sportska dvorana kralja Tomislava, Našice; Attendance: 2,000; Referees: Kiyashko, Kiselev (RUS)

28 February 2015; 14:15	Balatonfüred (Hungary)	24–30	(Germany) MT Melsungen	Veszprém Aréna, Veszprém; Attendance: 1,200; Referees: Boricic, Markovic (SRB)
28 February 2015; 14:15	Ligetvari 6	(9–16)	Maric 8	Veszprém Aréna, Veszprém; Attendance: 1,200; Referees: Boricic, Markovic (SRB)
28 February 2015; 14:15	3× (yellow card) 1× (suspension)	Report	3× (yellow card) 1× (suspension)	Veszprém Aréna, Veszprém; Attendance: 1,200; Referees: Boricic, Markovic (SRB)

28 February 2015; 19:00	Nexe Našice (Croatia)	29–29	(Sweden) Eskilstuna Guif	Sportska dvorana kralja Tomislava, Našice; Attendance: 2,000; Referees: Chaskis, Tsakonas (GRE)
28 February 2015; 19:00	Sokolic 5	(17–18)	Pettersson 10	Sportska dvorana kralja Tomislava, Našice; Attendance: 2,000; Referees: Chaskis, Tsakonas (GRE)
28 February 2015; 19:00	3× (yellow card) 4× (suspension)	Report	3× (yellow card) 5× (suspension)	Sportska dvorana kralja Tomislava, Našice; Attendance: 2,000; Referees: Chaskis, Tsakonas (GRE)

7 March 2015; 20:00	MT Melsungen (Germany)	29–23	(Hungary) Balatonfüred	Rothenbach-Halle, Kassel; Attendance: 2,015; Referees: Gudjonsson, Lindenskov Samuelsen (ISL)
7 March 2015; 20:00	Boomhouwer, Vučković 4	(16–11)	Boka, Szöllösi 5	Rothenbach-Halle, Kassel; Attendance: 2,015; Referees: Gudjonsson, Lindenskov Samuelsen (ISL)
7 March 2015; 20:00	3× (yellow card) 3× (suspension)	Report	2× (yellow card) 5× (suspension) 1× (red card)	Rothenbach-Halle, Kassel; Attendance: 2,015; Referees: Gudjonsson, Lindenskov Samuelsen (ISL)

8 March 2015; 19:00	Eskilstuna Guif (Sweden)	33–24	(Croatia) Nexe Našice	Eskilstuna Sporthall, Eskilstuna; Attendance: 697; Referees: Alvarez Mata, Bustamante Lopez (ESP)
8 March 2015; 19:00	Östlund 7	(17–12)	Çelebi 8	Eskilstuna Sporthall, Eskilstuna; Attendance: 697; Referees: Alvarez Mata, Bustamante Lopez (ESP)
8 March 2015; 19:00	3× (yellow card) 3× (suspension)	Report	3× (yellow card) 5× (suspension)	Eskilstuna Sporthall, Eskilstuna; Attendance: 697; Referees: Alvarez Mata, Bustamante Lopez (ESP)

14 March 2015; 19:00	Eskilstuna Guif (Sweden)	27–25	(Germany) MT Melsungen	Eskilstuna Sporthall, Eskilstuna; Attendance: 1,313; Referees: Hansen, Pettersen (NOR)
14 March 2015; 19:00	Pettersson 7	(16–14)	Boomhouwer, Fahlgren 4	Eskilstuna Sporthall, Eskilstuna; Attendance: 1,313; Referees: Hansen, Pettersen (NOR)
14 March 2015; 19:00	3× (yellow card) 6× (suspension)	Report	3× (yellow card) 6× (suspension)	Eskilstuna Sporthall, Eskilstuna; Attendance: 1,313; Referees: Hansen, Pettersen (NOR)

14 March 2015; 19:00	Nexe Našice (Croatia)	26–27	(Hungary) Balatonfüred	Sportska dvorana kralja Tomislava, Našice; Attendance: 1,800; Referees: Nabokau, Kulik (BLR)
14 March 2015; 19:00	three players 4	(13–16)	Söllösi 6	Sportska dvorana kralja Tomislava, Našice; Attendance: 1,800; Referees: Nabokau, Kulik (BLR)
14 March 2015; 19:00	3× (yellow card) 5× (suspension)	Report	2× (yellow card) 7× (suspension) 2× (red card)	Sportska dvorana kralja Tomislava, Našice; Attendance: 1,800; Referees: Nabokau, Kulik (BLR)

20 March 2015; 18:15	Balatonfüred (Hungary)	23–25	(Sweden) Eskilstuna Guif	Veszprém Aréna, Veszprém; Attendance: 1,000; Referees: Harabagiu, Stanescu (ROU)
20 March 2015; 18:15	Ivancsik, Zdolik 6	(11–8)	Pettersson 8	Veszprém Aréna, Veszprém; Attendance: 1,000; Referees: Harabagiu, Stanescu (ROU)
20 March 2015; 18:15	3× (yellow card) 5× (suspension)	Report	1× (yellow card) 4× (suspension)	Veszprém Aréna, Veszprém; Attendance: 1,000; Referees: Harabagiu, Stanescu (ROU)

21 March 2015; 20:00	MT Melsungen (Germany)	34–26	(Croatia) Nexe Našice	Rothenbach-Halle, Kassel; Attendance: 1,927; Referees: Accoto Martins, Accoto Martins (POR)
21 March 2015; 20:00	three players 5	(20–14)	Nuic 6	Rothenbach-Halle, Kassel; Attendance: 1,927; Referees: Accoto Martins, Accoto Martins (POR)
21 March 2015; 20:00	3× (yellow card) 1× (suspension)	Report	3× (yellow card) 1× (suspension)	Rothenbach-Halle, Kassel; Attendance: 1,927; Referees: Accoto Martins, Accoto Martins (POR)
