= 2014–15 EHF Cup =

Handball competition

EHF Cup
- 2014–15
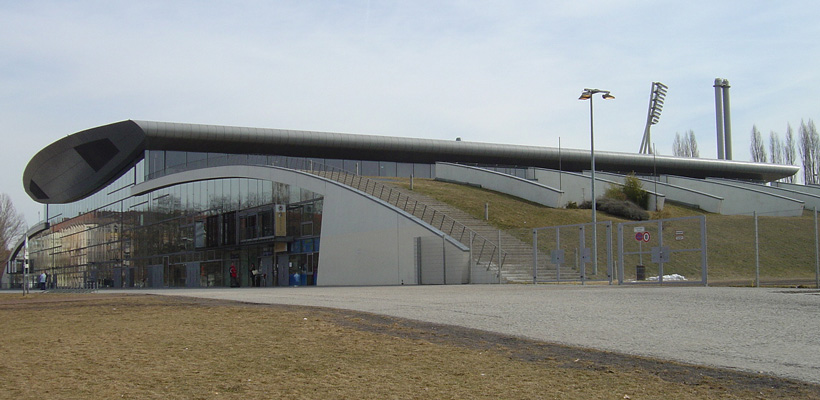
- The Max-Schmeling-Halle in Berlin, venue of the Final four tournament

Tournament information
- Sport: Handball
- Dates: 5 September 2014–17 May 2015
- Teams: 69 (qualification stage); 16 (group stage); 7 (knockout stage)

Final positions
- Champions: (Germany) Füchse Berlin (1st title)
- Runner-up: (Germany) HSV Hamburg

Tournament statistics
- Matches played: 58
- MVP: (France) Kentin Mahé
- Top scorer(s): (Slovenia) Staš Skube (81 goals)

The 2014–15 EHF Cup was the 34th edition of the EHF Cup, the second most important European handball club competition organised by the European Handball Federation (EHF), and the third edition since the merger with the EHF Cup Winners' Cup.

== Overview ==
=== Team allocation ===
The labels in the parentheses show how each team qualified for the place of its starting round:

- TH: Title holders
- CW: Cup winners
- CR: Cup runners-up
- 1st, 2nd, 3rd, 4th, 5th, 6th, etc.: League position
- ECL: Transferred from the EHF Champions League
  - QS: Losers from the qualification tournaments

Round 3
(Germany) Füchse Berlin (CW)	(Spain) Huesca (4th)	(Slovakia) Tatran Prešov (ECL QS)	(Serbia) Vojvodina (ECL QS)
(Germany) HSV Hamburg (4th)	(Slovenia) Gorenje (2nd)	(Portugal) Porto (ECL QS)	(Austria) Alpla HC Hard (ECL QS)
(Spain) Fraikin Granollers (3rd)	(Russia) St. Petersburg (2nd)	(Romania) HCM Constanța (ECL QS)	(Norway) Haslum HK (ECL QS)
Round 2
(Germany) MT Melsungen (6th)	(Denmark) SønderjyskE (5th)	(Switzerland) Pfadi Winterthur (2nd)	(Norway) Elverum (1st)
(Spain) Ademar León (5th)	(Slovenia) Maribor Branik (3rd)	(Croatia) Nexe Našice (2nd)	(Ukraine) Portovik (2nd)
(France) Nantes (4th)	(Hungary) Balatonfüred (3rd)	(Belarus) SKA Minsk (2nd)	(Netherlands) Targos Bevo HC (ECL QS)
(France) Fenix Toulouse (5th)	(Hungary) Tatabánya (CR)	(Romania) SMD Bacău (2nd)	(Italy) Junior Fasano (ECL QS)
(Denmark) Skjern (3rd)	(Russia) GK Permskie Medvedi (CW)	(Sweden) Eskilstuna Guif (3rd)	(Belgium) Initia Hasselt (ECL QS)
(Denmark) Tvis Holstebro (4th)	(Russia) Kaustik Volgograd (4th)	(Portugal) Sporting CP (2nd)	
Round 1
(Hungary) Orosháza (7th)	(Romania) Potaissa Turda (3rd)	(Slovakia) Topoľčany (2nd)	(Montenegro) Lovćen (1st)
(Russia) Dinamo Astrakhan (5th)	(Sweden) IFK Kristianstad (4th)	(Slovakia) HC Sporta Hlohovec (3rd)	(Iceland) ÍBV (1st)
(Switzerland) Kriens-Luzern (3rd)	(Serbia) Železničar 1949 (CW)	(Austria) Bregenz (CW)	(Iceland) Haukar (2nd)
(Switzerland) BSV Bern Muri (4th)	(Greece) Diomidis Argous (1st)	(Netherlands) OCI-Lions (2nd)	(Lithuania) Dragūnas Klaipėda (1st)
(Croatia) GRK Varaždin 1930 (3rd)	(Turkey) Nilüfer Belediyespor (CW)	(Netherlands) KRAS/Volendam (3rd)	(Kosovo) KH BESA Famiglia (1st)
(Croatia) Dubrava (4th)	(Luxembourg) Handball Käerjeng (1st)	(Belgium) Achilles Bocholt (2nd)	(Moldova) HC Olimpus-85 USEFS (1st)
(North Macedonia) Strumica (3rd)	(Luxembourg) Handball Esch (2nd)	(Italy) SSV Bozen Loacker (2nd)	(United Kingdom) London GD (1st)
(Poland) NMC Górnik Zabrze (3rd)	(Israel) Maccabi Tel Aviv (1st)	(Czech Republic) Talent M.A.T. Plzeň(1st)	
(Belarus) HC Gomel (3rd)	(Israel) Maccabi Rishon LeZion (2nd)	(Estonia) HC Kehra (1st)	

=== Round and draw dates ===
All draws were held at the European Handball Federation headquarters in Vienna, Austria.

Phase	Round	Draw date	First leg	Second leg
Qualifying	Qualification round 1	22 July 2014	6–7 September 2014	13–14 September 2014
Qualifying	Qualification round 2	22 July 2014	11–12 October 2014	18–19 October 2014
Qualifying	Qualification round 3	21 October 2014	22–23 November 2014	29–30 November 2014
Group stage	Matchday 1	4 December 2014	14–15 February 2015	
Group stage	Matchday 2	4 December 2014	21–22 February 2015	
Group stage	Matchday 3	4 December 2014	28 February–1 March 2015	
Group stage	Matchday 4	4 December 2014	7–8 March 2015	
Group stage	Matchday 5	4 December 2014	14–15 March 2015	
Group stage	Matchday 6	4 December 2014	21–22 March 2015	
Knockout stage	Quarterfinal	24 March 2015	11–12 April 2015	18–19 April 2015
Final 4 (Berlin)	Semifinal	21 April 2015	16 May 2015	
Final 4 (Berlin)	Final	21 April 2015	17 May 2015	

== Qualification stage ==
The qualification stage consisted of three rounds, which were played as two-legged ties using a home-and-away system. In the draws for each round, teams were allocated into two pots, with teams from Pot 1 facing teams from Pot 2. The winners of each pairing (highlighted in bold) qualified for the following round.

For each round, teams listed first played the first leg at home. In some cases, teams agreed to play both matches at the same venue.

=== Round 1 ===
A total of 34 teams entered the draw for the first qualification round, which was held on Tuesday, 22 July 2014. The first legs were played on 6–7 September and the second legs were played on 13–14 September 2014.

Team 1	Agg.	Team 2	1st leg	2nd leg
Achilles Bocholt (Belgium)	59–63	(Serbia) **Železničar 1949**	31–30	28–33
**Bregenz** (Austria)	64–50^{a}	(Lithuania) Dragūnas Klaipėda	28–24	36–26
Diomidis Argous (Greece)	36–60	(Sweden) **IFK Kristianstad**	19–30	17–30
**HC Sporta Hlohovec** (Slovakia)	56–48	(Turkey) Nilüfer Belediyespor	35–25	21–23
Lovćen (Montenegro)	47–67^{b}	(Switzerland) **HC Kriens-Luzern**	22–30	25–37
KRAS/Volendam (Netherlands)	52–55	(Slovakia) **Topoľčany**	29–32	23–23
Dubrava (Croatia)	55–63	(Croatia) **GRK Varaždin 1930**	26–30	29–33
London GD (United Kingdom)	30–72^{c}	(Netherlands) **OCI-Lions**	18–28	12–44
HC Olimpus-85 USEFS (Moldova)	56–62^{d}	(Hungary) **Orosháza**	28–34	28–28
Maccabi Tel Aviv (Israel)	55–67^{e}	(Romania) **Potaissa Turda**	25–32	30–35
ÍBV (Iceland)	50–57^{f}	(Israel) **Maccabi Rishon LeZion**	25–30	25–27
**Talent M.A.T. Plzeň** (Czech Republic)	50–43^{g}	(Italy) SSV Bozen Loacker	26–26	24–17
**BSV Bern Muri** (Switzerland)	55–38	(Belarus) HC Gomel	29–15	26–23
Haukar (Iceland)	53–54	(Russia) **Dinamo Astrakhan**	27–29	26–25
**KH BESA Famiglia** (Kosovo)	63–55^{h}	(Estonia) HC Kehra	31–32	32–23
**NMC Górnik Zabrze** (Poland)	70–52	(North Macedonia) Strumica	36–25	34–27
Handball Käerjeng (Luxembourg)	48–59	(Luxembourg) **Handball Esch**	23–34	25–25

Notes

^{a} Both legs were hosted by Bregenz.
^{b} Both legs were hosted by Krienz-Luzern.
^{c} Both legs were hosted by OCI-Lions.
^{d} Both legs were hosted by Orosháza.

^{e} Both legs were hosted by Potaissa Turda.
^{f} Both legs were hosted by ÍBV.
^{g} Both legs were hosted by Talent M.A.T. Plzeň.
^{h} Both legs were hosted by BESA Famiglia.

=== Round 2 ===
A total of 40 teams entered the draw for the second qualification round, which was held on Tuesday, 22 July 2014. Among these teams were the fourth-placed teams from the 2014–15 EHF Champions League qualification tournaments (Pot 1) and the 17 winners of the previous round (Pot 2). The first legs were played on 11–12 October and the second legs were played on 18–19 October 2014.

Team 1	Agg.	Team 2	1st leg	2nd leg
**Eskilstuna Guif** (Sweden)	55–52	(Denmark) SønderjyskE	29–27	26–25
**SKA Minsk** (Belarus)	64–63	(Poland) NMC Górnik Zabrze	34–30	30–33
**SMD Bacău** (Romania)	62–55^{a}	(Netherlands) OCI-Lions	34–29	28–26
KH BESA Famiglia (Kosovo)	51–83^{b}	(Croatia) **Nexe Našice**	25–40	26–43
**Balatonfüred** (Hungary)	46–43	(Russia) Dinamo Astrakhan	21–23	25–20
Bregenz (Austria)	59–72	(Denmark) **Skjern**	27–36	32–36
**Nantes** (France)	72–53	(Croatia) GRK Varaždin 1930	42–27	30–26
**Topoľčany** (Slovakia)	59–49	(Netherlands) Targos Bevo HC	32–25	27–24
**Tvis Holstebro** (Denmark)	71–59	(Switzerland) Kriens-Luzern	35–23	36–36
**Pfadi Winterthur** (Switzerland)	65–55	(Serbia) Železničar 1949	35–26	30–29
**Kaustik Volgograd** (Russia)	20–0	(Ukraine) Portovik	10–0	10–0
**Sporting CP** (Portugal)	62–57	(Slovakia) HC Sporta Hlohovec	34–24	28–33
Maribor Branik (Slovenia)	50–61	(Sweden) **IFK Kristianstad**	26–25	24–36
Junior Fasano (Italy)	53–67	(Romania) **Potaissa Turda**	27–28	26–39
BSV Bern Muri (Switzerland)	51–67	(Spain) **Ademar León**	30–38	21–29
Handball Esch (Luxembourg)	49–50^{c}	(Hungary) **Tatabánya**	24–25	25–25
Talent M.A.T. Plzeň (Czech Republic)	48–55	(Russia) **Permskie Medvedi**	23–25	25–30
**MT Melsungen** (Germany)	57–53	(France) Fenix Toulouse	34–27	23–26
Initia Hasselt (Belgium)	46–56	(Hungary) **Orosháza**	25–26	21–30
**Elverum** (Norway)	65–52^{d}	(Israel) Maccabi Rishon LeZion	36–28	29–24

Notes

^{a} Both legs were hosted by SMD Bacău.
^{b} Both legs were hosted by Nexe Našice.

^{c} Both legs were hosted by Handball Esch.
^{d} Both legs were hosted by Elverum.

=== Round 3 ===
A total of 32 teams entered the draw for the third qualification round, which was held on Tuesday, 21 October 2014. Among these teams were the runners-up and third-placed teams from the 2014–15 EHF Champions League qualification tournaments (Pot 1) and the 20 winners of the previous round. The first legs were played on 11–12 October and the second legs were played on 18–19 October 2014. The 16 winners qualified for the group stage.

Team 1	Agg.	Team 2	1st leg	2nd leg
**Porto** (Portugal)	54–52	(Spain) Ademar León	29–24	25–28
**Tvis Holstebro** (Denmark)	61–55	(Romania) SMD Bacău	32–27	29–28
**Nexe Našice** (Croatia)	58–46	(Romania) Potaissa Turda	35–20	23–26
**Füchse Berlin** (Germany)	46–46 (a)	(France) Nantes	23–18	23–28
Kaustik Volgograd (Russia)	57–64	(Norway) **Haslum HK**	31–28	26–36
**MT Melsungen** (Germany)	56–50	(Slovakia) Tatran Prešov	31–24	25–26
IFK Kristianstad (Sweden)	55–55 (a)	(Germany) **HSV Hamburg**	27–29	28–26
Alpla HC Hard (Austria)	49–52	(Hungary) **Balatonfüred**	31–26	18–26
**HCM Constanța** (Romania)	57–50	(Norway) Elverum	27–21	30–29
Tatabánya (Hungary)	47–54	(Russia) **St. Petersburg**	23–22	24–32
Topoľčany (Slovakia)	51–60	(Switzerland) **Pfadi Winterthur**	26–28	25–32
**Eskilstuna Guif** (Sweden)	55–50	(Spain) Huesca	32–24	23–26
Sporting CP (Portugal)	50–50 (a)	(Spain) **Fraikin Granollers**	27–25	23–25
Permskie Medvedi (Russia)	63–76	(Slovenia) **Gorenje**	34–37	29–39
**Skjern** (Denmark)	72–45	(Hungary) Orosháza	40–20	32–25
**Vojvodina** (Serbia)	52–50	(Belarus) SKA Minsk	27–22	25–28

== Group stage ==
Location of teams of the 2014–15 EHF Cup group stage.
Red: Group A; Green: Group B; Blue: Group C; Yellow: Group D.

=== Draw and format ===
The draw of the EHF Cup group phase took place on Thursday, 4 December 2014, at 11:00 CET. The 16 teams allocated into four pots were drawn into four groups of four teams. The country protection rule was applied, i.e. two clubs from the same country could not face each other in the same group.

In each group, teams played against each other home-and-away in a round-robin format. The matchdays were 14–15 February, 21–22 February, 28 February – 1 March, 7–8 March, 14–15 March, and 21–22 March 2015.

If Füchse Berlin, as the organiser of the Final 4 tournament, win their group or finish among top three second-ranked teams, they will receive a direct qualification to the Final 4 tournament. If the German side wins their group then the other three group winners and the three best second ranked team will qualify for the quarter-finals. If the Germans finish among the top three second-ranked teams, the quarter-finals will consist of four group winners and two best second-ranked teams. If Füchse Berlin finish as the worst second-ranked team, they will have to play the quarter-final match. Should the German club rank on the third or fourth position in their group, they will be out of the competition, but they will still organize the Final 4 tournament.

If two or more teams are equal on points on completion of the group matches, the following criteria are applied to determine the rankings (in descending order):

1. number of points in matches of all teams directly involved;
2. goal difference in matches of all teams directly involved;
3. higher number of plus goals in matches of all teams directly involved;
4. goal difference in all matches of the group;
5. higher number of plus goals in all matches of the group;

If no ranking can be determined, a decision shall be obtained by drawing lots. Lots shall be drawn by the EHF, if possible in the presence of a responsible of each club.

=== Seeding ===
On 1 December 2014, EHF announced the composition of the group phase seeding pots.

Pot 1	Pot 2	Pot 3	Pot 4
(Germany) HSV Hamburg	(Spain) Fraikin Granollers	(Germany) Füchse Berlin	(Croatia) Nexe Našice
(Germany) MT Melsungen	(Hungary) Balatonfüred	(Russia) St. Petersburg	(Denmark) Skjern
(Portugal) Porto	(Norway) Haslum HK	(Slovenia) Gorenje	(Denmark) Tvis Holstebro
(Romania) HCM Constanța	(Serbia) Vojvodina	(Sweden) Eskilstuna Guif	(Switzerland) Pfadi Winterthur

=== Group A ===
Pos	Team	Pld	W	D	L	GF	GA	GD	Pts	Qualification	HSV	GOR	HAS	WIN
1	(Germany) HSV Hamburg (A)	6	5	0	1	189	169	+20	10	Advance to knockout stage	—	33–28	36–26	30–28
2	(Slovenia) Gorenje (A)	6	4	0	2	192	160	+32	8	Advance to knockout stage	31–32	—	34–21	30–26
3	(Norway) Haslum HK (E)	6	2	0	4	160	194	−34	4		34–32	22–34	—	23–27
4	(Switzerland) Pfadi Winterthur (E)	6	1	0	5	160	178	−18	2		22–26	26–35	31–34	—

Updated to match(es) played on 21 March 2015. Source: EHF
Rules for classification: Group stage tiebreakers
(A) Advance to a further round; (E) Eliminated

=== Group B ===
Pos	Team	Pld	W	D	L	GF	GA	GD	Pts	Qualification	HOL	GRA	CON	PET
1	(Denmark) Tvis Holstebro (A)	6	4	2	0	185	168	+17	10	Advance to knockout stage	—	29–24	34–28	28–24
2	(Spain) Fraikin Granollers (E)	6	3	1	2	159	154	+5	7		28–28	—	23–21	30–26
3	(Romania) HCM Constanța (E)	6	1	2	3	163	178	−15	4		34–34	28–27	—	25–25
4	(Russia) St. Petersburg (E)	6	1	1	4	162	169	−7	3		30–32	22–27	35–27	—

Updated to match(es) played on 22 March 2015. Source: EHF
Rules for classification: Group stage tiebreakers
(A) Advance to a further round; (E) Eliminated

=== Group C ===
Pos	Team	Pld	W	D	L	GF	GA	GD	Pts	Qualification	BER	SKJ	POR	VOJ
1	(Germany) Füchse Berlin (A)	6	5	0	1	175	143	+32	10	Advance to knockout stage	—	29–24	25–20	37–22
2	(Denmark) Skjern (A)	6	5	0	1	164	147	+17	10	Advance to knockout stage	32–28	—	27–21	32–23
3	(Portugal) Porto (E)	6	2	0	4	142	152	−10	4		20–26	23–24	—	29–23
4	(Serbia) Vojvodina (E)	6	0	0	6	143	182	−39	0		25–30	23–25	27–29	—

Updated to match(es) played on 21 March 2015. Source: EHF
Rules for classification: Group stage tiebreakers
(A) Advance to a further round; (E) Eliminated

=== Group D ===
Pos	Team	Pld	W	D	L	GF	GA	GD	Pts	Qualification	MEL	GUI	NEX	BAL
1	(Germany) MT Melsungen (A)	6	5	0	1	177	152	+25	10	Advance to knockout stage	—	31–27	34–26	29–23
2	(Sweden) Eskilstuna Guif (A)	6	3	2	1	165	156	+9	8	Advance to knockout stage	27–25	—	33–24	24–24
3	(Croatia) Nexe Našice (E)	6	1	1	4	161	170	−9	3		25–28	29–29	—	26–27
4	(Hungary) Balatonfüred (E)	6	1	1	4	140	165	−25	3		24–30	23–25	19–31	—

Updated to match(es) played on 21 March 2015. Source: EHF
Rules for classification: Group stage tiebreakers
(A) Advance to a further round; (E) Eliminated

=== Ranking of the second-placed teams ===
The ranking of the second-placed teams was carried out on the basis of the team's results in the group stage. Because the German side Füchse Berlin, the organizers of the Final 4 tournament, finished on top of their group they qualified directly to the final tournament and only the top three second-placed teams qualified to the quarter-finals.

Pos	Team	Pld	W	D	L	GF	GA	GD	Pts
1	(Denmark) Skjern Håndbold	6	5	0	1	164	147	+17	10
2	(Slovenia) Gorenje	6	4	0	2	192	160	+32	8
3	(Sweden) Eskilstuna Guif	6	3	2	1	165	156	+9	8
4	(Spain) Fraikin Granollers	6	3	1	2	159	154	+5	7

== Knockout stage ==
=== Quarter-finals ===
==== Draw and format ====
Because the hosts of the Final 4 tournament, Füchse Berlin, finished the group stage among the group winners, they have clinched the direct ticket to the final weekend and decided that only three quarter-finals will be played for the remaining spots in the final tournament. The draw of the EHF Cup quarter-finals took place on Tuesday 24 March 2015 at the EHF headquarters in Vienna, Austria. Six teams were positioned into two pots with the country protection rule not applied: two clubs from the same country could face each other in the quarter-finals. However, teams from the same group could not face each other in the quarter-finals. The first pot contained the three group winners and the second pot contained the top three second-placed teams.

In the quarter-finals, teams played against each other on a home-and-away basis, with the teams from second pot playing the first leg at home. The first leg matches were played over 11–12 April, and the second leg matches were played over 18–19 April.

Pot 1
(Germany) HSV Hamburg
(Denmark) Team Tvis Holstebro
(Germany) MT Melsungen

Pot 2
(Slovenia) Gorenje
(Denmark) Skjern Håndbold
(Sweden) Eskilstuna Guif

Team 1	Agg.	Team 2	1st leg	2nd leg
Eskilstuna Guif (Sweden)	51–53	(Germany) HSV Hamburg	29–26	22-27
Skjern Håndbold (Denmark)	48–48	(Germany) MT Melsungen	25–20	23-28
Gorenje (Slovenia)	59–57	(Denmark) Team Tvis Holstebro	28–27	31-30

=== Final four ===
The tournament was played at the 8,700 capacity Max-Schmeling-Halle in the German capital Berlin, the home of Füchse Berlin.

Semi-finals
16 May
(Slovenia) Gorenje	24
(Germany) Füchse Berlin	27
16 May
(Denmark) Skjern Håndbold	23
(Germany) HSV Hamburg	27

Final
17 May
(Germany) Füchse Berlin	30
(Germany) HSV Hamburg	27
Third place
17 May
(Slovenia) Gorenje	22
(Denmark) Skjern Håndbold	27

== Top goalscorers ==
Rank	Name	Team	Goals
1	(Slovenia) Staš Skube	(Slovenia) Gorenje	81
2	(France) Kentin Mahé	(Germany) HSV Hamburg	69
3	(Slovenia) Mario Šoštarič	(Slovenia) Gorenje	58
4	(Germany) Adrian Pfahl	(Germany) HSV Hamburg	55
5	(Sweden) Viktor Östlund	(Sweden) Eskilstuna Guif	54
6	(Denmark) Michael Damgaard	(Denmark) Tvis Holstebro	51
7	(Denmark) Patrick Wiesmach	(Denmark) Tvis Holstebro	49
7	(Sweden) Daniel Petterson	(Sweden) Eskilstuna Guif	49
7	(Sweden) Mathias Tholin	(Sweden) Eskilstuna Guif	49
10	(Denmark) Morten Balling	(Denmark) Skjern	48

== See also ==
- 2014–15 EHF Champions League
- 2014–15 EHF Challenge Cup
