= 2022–23 Andebol 1 =

Andebol 1
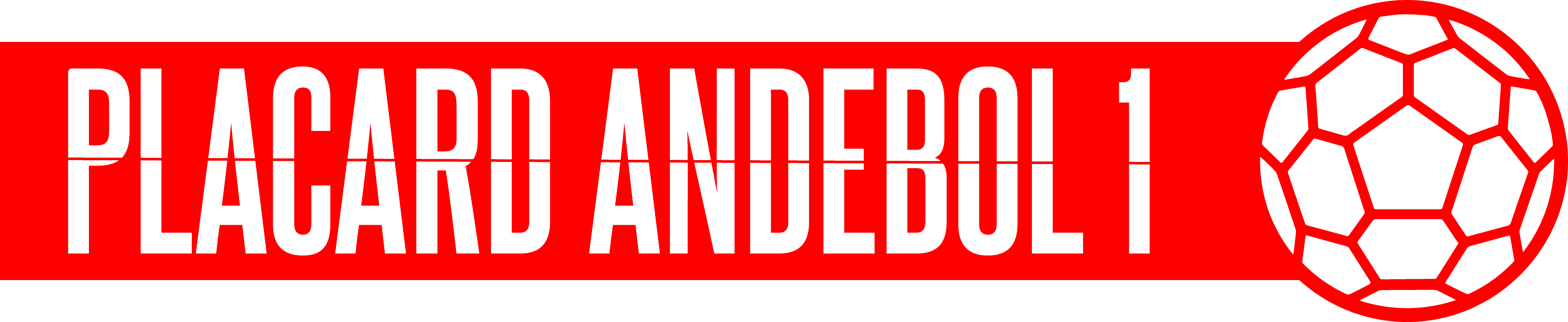
- Season: 2022–23
- Dates: 17 September 2022 – 3 June 2023
- Champion: Porto; 24th title
- Relegated: Académico de Viseu; ADA Maia; GC Santo Tirso
- Champions League: Porto
- European League: Sporting; Benfica; ABC Braga; Águas Santas
- Top goalscorer: Délcio Pina (201 goals)

The 2022–23 Andebol 1 (known as the Campeonato Placard Andebol 1) is the 71st season of the Andebol 1, Portuguese premier handball league. It runs from 17 September 2022 to 23 June 2023.

== Teams ==
Location of teams in 2022–23 Andebol 1 (Mainland)
Location of teams in 2021–22 Andebol 1 (Madeira)

=== Arenas and locations ===
The following 14 clubs compete in the Andebol 1 during the 2022–23 season:

Team	Location	Arena	Sponsors
ABC Braga	Braga	Pavilhão Flávio Sá Leite	Universidade do Minho
Académico de Viseu	Viseu	Pavilhão Gimnodesportivo do Parque do Fontelo	
ADA Maia	Maia	Pavilhão Municipal da Maia	Universidade da Maia (ISMAI)
Águas Santas	Maia	Pavilhão da Associação Atlética de Águas Santas	Milaneza
Avanca	Estarreja	Pavilhão Comendador Adelino Dias Costa	Bioria
Belenenses	Lisbon	Pavilhão Acácio Rosa	Zumub
Benfica	Lisbon	Pavilhão da Luz Nº 2	Metro Numbers
Gaia	Vila Nova de Gaia	Pavilhão F.C. Gaia	Empril
Marítimo Madeira SAD	Madeira	Pavilhão do Marítimo	
Porto	Porto	Dragão Arena	Betano
Póvoa	Póvoa de Varzim	Pavilhão Municipal da Póvoa de Varzim	Bodegão & Grupo CCR
Santo Tirso	Santo Tirso	Pavilhão Municipal de Santo Tirso	Retrotarget
Sporting CP	Lisbon	Pavilhão João Rocha	Kelly
Vitória de Setúbal	Setúbal	Pavilhão Antoine Velge	

== League table ==
Pos	Team	Pld	W	D	L	GF	GA	GD	Pts	Qualification or relegation
1	Porto	26	24	1	1	939	708	+231	75	Qualification for Champions League group phase
2	Sporting	26	23	2	1	872	686	+186	74	Qualification for European League group phase
3	Benfica	26	20	3	3	822	667	+155	69	Qualification for European League group phase
4	ABC Braga	26	16	0	10	791	773	+18	58	Qualification for European League qualification round
5	Águas Santas	26	15	1	10	708	673	+35	57	Qualification for European League qualification round
6	Belenenses	26	11	4	11	697	719	−22	52	
7	Marítimo Madeira SAD	26	12	1	13	735	733	+2	51	
8	Gaia	26	12	1	13	719	725	−6	51	
9	Vitória de Setúbal	26	11	2	13	748	763	−15	50	
10	Póvoa	26	10	1	15	703	767	−64	47	
11	Avanca	26	8	1	17	677	734	−57	43	Qualification for Relegation play-offs
12	Académico de Viseu	26	5	1	20	661	810	−149	37	Qualification for Relegation play-offs
13	ADA Maia	26	4	1	21	637	756	−119	35	Relegated to Segunda Divisão
14	Santo Tirso	26	1	1	24	629	824	−195	29	Relegated to Segunda Divisão

Source: Portuguese Handball Federation - Fase Unica (in Portuguese), Flashscore
Rules for classification: 1) points; 2) head-to-head points; 3) goal difference; 4) goals scored; 5) head-to-head goal difference; 6) head-to-head number of goals scored.

== Promotion/relegation play-offs ==
The 11th and 12th-placed teams of the Andebol 1 faces the 2nd-placed team of the Segunda Divisão. The first place promoted to Andebol 1 and the last two relegated to Segunda Divisão.

Pos	Team	Pld	W	D	L	GF	GA	GD	Pts	Qualification or relegation
1	Avanca	2	2	0	0	66	50	+16	6	Promoted to Andebol 1
2	Académico de Viseu	2	1	0	1	53	50	+3	4	Relegated to Segunda Divisão
3	Nazaré Dom Fuas	2	0	0	2	42	61	−19	2	Relegated to Segunda Divisão

Source: Portuguese Handball Federation - Jogos de Apuramento (in Portuguese)
Rules for classification: 1) points; 2) head-to-head points; 3) goal difference; 4) goals scored; 5) head-to-head goal difference; 6) head-to-head number of goals scored.

== Top goalscorers ==
Rank	Player	Club	Goals
1	(Cape Verde) Délcio Pina	Marítimo Madeira SAD	201
2	(Portugal) João Carvalho	ADA Maia	169
3	(Portugal) Manuel Lima	ABC Braga	148
4	(Brazil) Vinícios Carvalho	ABC Braga	146

== See also ==
- 2022-23 Portuguese Handball Cup
- 2022 Portuguese Handball Super Cup
