= 2023–24 EHF European League =

European secondary club handball tournament

EHF European League
- 2023–24

Tournament information
- Sport: Handball
- Dates: 26 August 2023–26 May 2024
- Teams: 10 (qualification stage); 32 (group stage)
- Website: ehfel.com

Final positions
- Champions: (Germany) SG Flensburg-Handewitt (2nd title)
- Runner-up: (Germany) Füchse Berlin

Tournament statistics
- Matches played: 148
- Goals scored: 7,530 (50.88 per match)
- MVP: (Denmark) Emil Jakobsen
- Top scorer(s): (Ukraine) Andrii Akimenko (95 goals)

The 2023–24 EHF European League is the 43rd season of Europe's secondary club handball tournament organised by European Handball Federation (EHF), and the 4th season since it was renamed from the EHF Cup to the EHF European League. This is the first season under the new revamped format. The defending champions are Füchse Berlin.

SG Flensburg-Handewitt won their second title after winning an all-German final against defending champions Füchse Berlin.

== Format ==
The tournament is divided in the following phases:

- Qualification round: 10 teams will be drawn into 5 different home and away ties. The 5 winners will advance to the group stage.
- Group stage: The 27 teams already qualified along with the 5 winners of the qualification round will be drawn into 8 groups of 4 teams each, where they will play in a double round-robin format. The top 2 teams in each group will progress to the main round. Teams from the same country can't be drawn into the same group.
- Main round: The 16 group winners and runners-up will be placed in 4 groups of 4 teams each where they will play a single round-robin. The winners will advance directly to the quarterfinals, while 2nd and 3rd placed teams will qualify for the play-offs.
- Play-offs: The 2nd and 3rd placed teams from each group in the main round will play in 4 different home and away ties. The winners will progress to the quarterfinals.
- Quarter-finals: The main round group winners will face a play-off winner to determine who makes it to the European League finals.
- EL finals: They will be played in a Final 4 format similar to the Champions League.

== Rankings ==
The rankings are based on the performances of each club from a respective country from a three-year period.This season, the EHF decided to make separate rankings for each club competition.

- Associations 1–2 can have four clubs qualify.
- Associations 3–9 can have three clubs qualify.
- Associations 10–18 can have two clubs qualify.
- Associations below the top 18 are allowed to enter apply one club for a potential wildcard.

Rank	Association	Average points	Teams
1	Germany	129.33	4
2	Portugal	99.67	4
3	France	78.67	2
4	Poland	77.00	2
5	Denmark	61.00	2
6	Croatia	53.00	1
7	Sweden	47.00	3
8	Switzerland	46.00	2
9	Spain	45.33	3
10	Slovenia	45.00	2
11	North Macedonia	39.67	2
12	Russia	32,67	0
13	Hungary	31.33	0

Rank	Association	Average points	Teams
14	Austria	31.33	0
15	Slovakia	20.00	1
16	Romania	18.00	2
17	Greece	17.33	1
18	Norway	11.33	1
19	Turkey	9.00	0
20	Finland	8.67	0
21	Belarus	8.00	0
22	Czech Republic	7.67	0
22	Ukraine	7.67	0
24	Iceland	7.00	0
25	Belgium	7.00	0
26	Serbia	4.33	1

Rank	Association	Average points	Teams
26	Israel	4.33	0
28	Luxembourg	3.67	0
29	Italy	3.00	0
30	Bosnia and Herzegovina	1.00	1
30	Estonia	1.00	0
30	(United Kingdom) Great Britain	1.00	0
30	(Georgia (country)) Georgia	1.00	0
30	Lithuania	1.00	0
30	Montenegro	1.00	1
30	Malta	1.00	0
37	Kosovo	0.33	0
37	Netherlands	0.33	0
39	(N/A) Everyone else	0.00	0

== Qualified teams ==
The full list of teams qualified for each stage of the 2023–24 EHF European League was announced on 10 July 2023.

The labels in the parentheses show how each team qualified for the place of its starting round:

- EL: European League title holders
- EC: European Cup title holders
- CW: Cup winners
- CR: Cup runners-up
- 4th, 5th, etc.: League position of the previous season

Group stage
(Germany) Füchse Berlin (3rd)^{EL}	(Portugal) Sporting CP (2nd)	(France) HBC Nantes (3rd)	(Spain) REBI BM Cuenca (2nd)
(Poland) Górnik Zabrze (3rd)	(Croatia) RK Nexe (2nd)	(Denmark) Bjerringbro-Silkeborg (3rd)	(Switzerland) Kadetten Schaffhausen (1st)
(Sweden) IFK Kristianstad (1st)	(North Macedonia) HC Alkaloid (2nd)	(Hungary) MOL-Tatabánya KC (3rd)	(Slovenia) RK Gorenje Velenje (2nd)
(Slovakia) MŠK Považská Bystrica (1st)	(Romania) Dinamo București (1st)	(Greece) AEK Athens (1st)	(Norway) Elverum Håndball (2nd)
(Germany) SG Flensburg-Handewitt (4th)	(Portugal) SL Benfica (3rd)	(France) Chambéry Savoie MBH (4th)	(Spain) Logroño La Rioja (CR)
(Poland) Chrobry Głogów (4th)	(Denmark) Skjern Håndbold (4th)	(Switzerland) HC Kriens-Luzern (2nd)	(Sweden) IK Sävehof (2nd)
(Serbia) RK Vojvodina (1st)^{EC} ^{WC}	(Bosnia and Herzegovina) RK Izviđač (1st) ^{WC}	(Montenegro) RK Lovćen (1st) ^{WC}	

Qualification round
(Germany) Rhein-Neckar Löwen (5th)	(Portugal) ABC Braga (4th)	(Spain) Fraikin BM Granollers (3rd)	(Switzerland) Pfadi Winterthur (3rd)
(Sweden) Ystads IF (3rd)	(North Macedonia) Vardar 1961 (3rd)	(Slovenia) RK Trimo Trebnje (3rd)	(Romania) CSM Constanța (CW)
(Germany) TSV Hannover-Burgdorf (6th)	(Portugal) Águas Santas Milaneza (5th)		

- ^{WC} Accepted Wildcard

== Schedule ==
All draws were held at the EHF headquarters in Vienna, Austria.

Phase	Round	Draw date	Round date
Qualification round	First leg	18 July 2023	26–27 August 2023
Qualification round	Second leg	18 July 2023	2–3 September 2023
Group stage	Matchday 1	21 July 2023	17 October 2023
Group stage	Matchday 2	21 July 2023	24 October 2023
Group stage	Matchday 3	21 July 2023	14 November 2023
Group stage	Matchday 4	21 July 2023	21 November 2023
Group stage	Matchday 5	21 July 2023	28 November 2023
Group stage	Matchday 6	21 July 2023	5 December 2023
Main Round	Matchday 7	21 July 2023	13 February 2024
Main Round	Matchday 8	21 July 2023	20 February 2024
Main Round	Matchday 9	21 July 2023	27 February 2024
Main Round	Matchday 10	21 July 2023	5 March 2024
Play offs	First leg	no draw	26 March 2024
Play offs	Second leg	no draw	2 April 2024
Quarterfinals	First leg	no draw	23 April 2024
Quarterfinals	Second leg	no draw	30 April 2025
Final four	Semi-finals	3 May 2024	25 May 2024
Final four	Final and Third place game	3 May 2024	26 May 2024

== Draw ==
The Draw took place on the 21 July 2023. The only restriction was that clubs from the same country cannot be in the same group.

Pot 1	Pot 2	Pot 3	Pot 4
(Germany) Füchse Berlin (Portugal) Sporting CP (France) HBC Nantes (Spain) REBI BM Cuenca (Poland) Górnik Zabrze (Croatia) RK Nexe (Denmark) Bjerringbro-Silkeborg (Switzerland) Kadetten Schaffhausen	(Sweden) IFK Kristianstad (North Macedonia) HC Alkaloid (Hungary) MOL-Tatabánya KC (Slovenia) RK Gorenje Velenje (Slovakia) MŠK Považská Bystrica (Romania) Dinamo București (Greece) AEK Athens (Norway) Elverum Håndball	(Germany) SG Flensburg-Handewitt (Portugal) SL Benfica (France) Chambéry Savoie MBH (Spain) Logroño La Rioja (Poland) Chrobry Głogów (Denmark) Skjern Håndbold (Switzerland) HC Kriens-Luzern (Sweden) IK Sävehof	(N/A) Play Off Winner 1 (Note: The eventual team in this slot was TSV Hannover-Burgdorf.) (N/A) Play Off Winner 2 (Note: The eventual team in this slot was ABC Braga) (N/A) Play Off Winner 3 (Note: The eventual team in this slot was Pfadi Winterthur) (N/A) Play Off Winner 4 (Note: The eventual team in this slot was Rhein-Neckar Löwen) (N/A) Play Off Winner 5 (Note: The eventual team in this slot was CSM Constanța) (Serbia) RK Vojvodina (Bosnia and Herzegovina) RK Izviđač (Montenegro) RK Lovćen

== Qualification round ==
The draw for the qualification round was conducted on 18 July 2023. The first legs will be held on 26–27 August 2023 while the second legs will be held on 2–3 September 2023.

Team 1	Agg.	Team 2	1st leg	2nd leg
Ystads IF (Sweden)	49–63	(Germany) TSV Hannover-Burgdorf	28–33	21–30
RK Trimo Trebnje (Slovenia)	57–58	(Portugal) ABC Braga	31–29	26–29
Águas Santas Milaneza (Portugal)	43–44	(Switzerland) Pfadi Winterthur	24–22	19–22
Vardar 1961 (North Macedonia)	58–71	(Germany) Rhein-Neckar Löwen	25–34	33–37
CSM Constanța (Romania)	52–51	(Spain) Fraikin BM Granollers	27–29	25–22 PS

== Group stage ==
Location of teams of the 2023–24 EHF European League group stage
Brown: Group A; Red: Group B; Orange: Group C; Yellow: Group D;
Green: Group E; Blue: Group F; Purple: Group G; Pink: Group H

The draw for the group stage was conducted on 21 July 2023 at the EHF office in Vienna.

In the group stage, teams were ranked according to points (2 points for a win, 1 point for a draw, 0 points for a loss). After completion of the group stage, if two or more teams have scored the same number of points, the ranking will be determined as follows:

Tiebreakers
1. Highest number of points in matches between the teams directly involved;
2. Superior goal difference in matches between the teams directly involved;
3. Highest number of goals scored in matches between the teams directly involved;
4. Superior goal difference in all matches of the group;
5. Highest number of plus goals in all matches of the group;
6. Drawing of Lots

=== Group A ===
Pos	Team	Pld	W	D	L	GF	GA	GD	Pts	Qualification	NAN	RHE	BEN	KRI
1	(France) HBC Nantes	6	5	0	1	201	177	+24	10 (Note: HBC Nantes 64–61 Rhein-Neckar Löwen)	Main round	—	32–25	37–28	31–27
2	(Germany) Rhein-Neckar Löwen	6	5	0	1	198	177	+21	10	Main round	36–32	—	39–30	36–28
3	(Portugal) SL Benfica	6	2	0	4	194	210	−16	4		34–38	35–36	—	36–33
4	(Sweden) IFK Kristianstad	6	0	0	6	162	191	−29	0		27–31	20–26	27–31	—

Source: EHF

=== Group B ===
Pos	Team	Pld	W	D	L	GF	GA	GD	Pts	Qualification	HAN	GOZ	LUZ	AEK
1	(Germany) TSV Hannover-Burgdorf	6	5	1	0	192	164	+28	11	Main round	—	34–28	30–30	31–25
2	(Poland) Górnik Zabrze	6	3	1	2	179	171	+8	7	Main round	29–32	—	32–28	30–21
3	(Switzerland) HC Kriens-Luzern	6	1	2	3	179	180	−1	4		23–31	30–30	—	39–27
4	(Greece) AEK Athens	6	1	0	5	158	193	−35	2		29–34	26–30	30–29	—

Source: EHF

=== Group C ===
Pos	Team	Pld	W	D	L	GF	GA	GD	Pts	Qualification	SAV	GOR	CUE	WIN
1	(Sweden) IK Sävehof	6	5	1	0	207	160	+47	11	Main round	—	36–34	40–27	41–20
2	(Slovenia) RK Gorenje Velenje	6	2	1	3	182	170	+12	5	Main round	28–28	—	28–20	34–26
3	(Spain) REBI BM Cuenca	6	2	0	4	153	181	−28	4 (Note: REBI BM Cuenca 56–56 Pfadi Winterthur. Placement decided on goal difference.)		22–30	28–27	—	28–24
4	(Switzerland) Pfadi Winterthur	6	2	0	4	163	194	−31	4		29–32	32–31	32–28	—

Source: EHF

=== Group D ===
Pos	Team	Pld	W	D	L	GF	GA	GD	Pts	Qualification	NEX	SKJ	BRA	POV
1	(Croatia) RK Nexe	6	5	0	1	215	172	+43	10	Main round	—	39–25	38–28	35–28
2	(Denmark) Skjern Håndbold	6	4	0	2	191	172	+19	8	Main round	33–30	—	32–25	42–22
3	(Portugal) ABC Braga	6	2	0	4	173	188	−15	4		30–34	25–32	—	31–26
4	(Slovakia) MŠK Považská Bystrica	6	1	0	5	161	208	−47	2		28–39	31–27	26–34	—

Source: EHF

=== Group E ===
Pos	Team	Pld	W	D	L	GF	GA	GD	Pts	Qualification	FLE	KAD	ELV	LOV
1	(Germany) SG Flensburg-Handewitt	6	5	0	1	218	162	+56	10	Main round	—	46–32	38–35	42–19
2	(Switzerland) Kadetten Schaffhausen	6	4	0	2	181	183	−2	8	Main round	25–24	—	32–30	36–26
3	(Norway) Elverum Håndball	6	3	0	3	192	181	+11	6		32–33	31–27	—	37–25
4	(Montenegro) RK Lovćen	6	0	0	6	141	206	−65	0		19–35	26–29	26–27	—

Source: EHF

=== Group F ===
Pos	Team	Pld	W	D	L	GF	GA	GD	Pts	Qualification	SIL	VOJ	ALK	LOG
1	(Denmark) Bjerringbro-Silkeborg	6	5	0	1	183	158	+25	10	Main round	—	26–22	35–31	34–25
2	(Serbia) RK Vojvodina	6	4	0	2	172	163	+9	8	Main round	29–28	—	34–29	24–25
3	(North Macedonia) HC Alkaloid	6	1	1	4	166	187	−21	3 (Note: Head to head points: HC Alkaloid 3–1 Logroño La Rioja)		23–31	26–31	—	28–27
4	(Spain) Logroño La Rioja	6	1	1	4	163	176	−13	3		28–29	29–32	29–29	—

Source: EHF

=== Group G ===
Pos	Team	Pld	W	D	L	GF	GA	GD	Pts	Qualification	FUC	BUC	CHA	IZV
1	(Germany) Füchse Berlin	6	6	0	0	194	160	+34	12	Main round	—	33–30	24–22	34–23
2	(Romania) Dinamo București	6	4	0	2	218	168	+50	8	Main round	32–33	—	36–33	52–24
3	(France) Chambéry Savoie MBH	6	2	0	4	181	181	0	4		31–36	21–28	—	34–30
4	(Bosnia and Herzegovina) RK Izviđač	6	0	0	6	150	234	−84	0		22–34	24–40	27–40	—

Source: EHF

=== Group H ===
Pos	Team	Pld	W	D	L	GF	GA	GD	Pts	Qualification	CON	SPO	TAT	CHR
1	(Romania) CSM Constanța	6	4	1	1	172	158	+14	9	Main round	—	29–28	28–25	29–18
2	(Portugal) Sporting CP	6	4	0	2	199	158	+41	8	Main round	34–28	—	36–28	37–20
3	(Hungary) MOL-Tatabánya KC	6	3	0	3	175	171	+4	6		24–29	31–29	—	37–24
4	(Poland) Chrobry Głogów	6	0	1	5	138	197	−59	1		29–29	22–35	25–30	—

Source: EHF

== Main round ==
In the main round, the remaining sixteen teams merge into four groups of four, where they play the teams they didn't play in the group stage. Points from the group stage against the teams that advanced with each other are carried over. At the end of the main round, The four group winners advance to the quarter-finals, while the 2nd and 3rd place teams qualify for the play-offs.

=== Group I ===
Pos	Team	Pld	W	D	L	GF	GA	GD	Pts	Qualification	NAN	RHE	HAN	GOZ
1	(France) HBC Nantes	6	5	0	1	197	164	+33	10	Quarter-finals	—	32–25	33–26	31–23
2	(Germany) Rhein-Neckar Löwen	6	4	0	2	173	166	+7	8	Play-offs	36–32	—	27–26	27–23
3	(Germany) TSV Hannover-Burgdorf	6	2	0	4	174	187	−13	4	Play-offs	32–38	24–32	—	34–28
4	(Poland) Górnik Zabrze	6	1	0	5	154	181	−27	2		22–31	29–26	29–32	—

Source: EHF

=== Group II ===
Pos	Team	Pld	W	D	L	GF	GA	GD	Pts	Qualification	SKJ	SAV	NEX	GOR
1	(Denmark) Skjern Håndbold	6	4	0	2	194	185	+9	8	Quarter-finals	—	33–34	33–30	45–31
2	(Sweden) IK Sävehof	6	3	1	2	187	181	+6	7 (Note: IK Sävehof 62–57 RK Nexe)	Play-offs	27–29	—	34–28	36–34
3	(Croatia) RK Nexe	6	3	1	2	187	174	+13	7	Play-offs	39–25	29–28	—	34–27
4	(Slovenia) RK Gorenje Velenje	6	0	2	4	171	199	−28	2		24–29	28–28	27–27	—

Source: EHF

=== Group III ===
Pos	Team	Pld	W	D	L	GF	GA	GD	Pts	Qualification	FLE	SIL	KAD	VOJ
1	(Germany) SG Flensburg-Handewitt	6	5	0	1	231	167	+64	10	Quarter-finals	—	38–28	46–32	42–30
2	(Denmark) Bjerringbro-Silkeborg	6	3	0	3	178	197	−19	6	Play-offs	26–45	—	36–30	26–22
3	(Switzerland) Kadetten Schaffhausen	6	2	0	4	168	188	−20	4 (Note: Kadetten Schaffhausen 48–48 RK Vojvodina. Placement decided on goal difference.)	Play-offs	25–24	33–34	—	27–24
4	(Serbia) RK Vojvodina	6	2	0	4	155	180	−25	4		26–36	29–28	24–21	—

Source: EHF

=== Group IV ===
Pos	Team	Pld	W	D	L	GF	GA	GD	Pts	Qualification	SPO	FUC	BUC	CON
1	(Portugal) Sporting CP	6	5	0	1	192	176	+16	10	Quarter-finals	—	32–28	35–33	34–28
2	(Germany) Füchse Berlin	6	4	0	2	192	186	+6	8	Play-offs	31–32	—	33–30	35–30
3	(Romania) Dinamo București	6	2	0	4	188	180	+8	4	Play-offs	27–31	32–33	—	33–23
4	(Romania) CSM Constanța	6	1	0	5	165	195	−30	2		29–28	29–32	25–33	—

Source: EHF

== Knockout stage ==
In the playoffs, the eight teams ranked 2nd–3rd in Main round Groups I-IV play against each other in two-legged home-and-away matches. The four winning teams advance to the quarterfinals, where they are joined by the top teams of Main round Groups I-IV for another round of two-legged home-and-away matches. The four quarterfinal winners qualify for the final four tournament at the Barclays Arena in Hamburg, Germany.

=== Playoffs ===
==== Overview ====
Team 1	Agg.	Team 2	1st leg	2nd leg
RK Nexe (Croatia)	48–55	(Germany) Rhein-Neckar Löwen	19–24	29–31
TSV Hannover-Burgdorf (Germany)	59–64	(Sweden) IK Sävehof	34–30	25–34
Dinamo București (Romania)	64–58	(Denmark) Bjerringbro-Silkeborg	37–34	27–24
Kadetten Schaffhausen (Switzerland)	56–66	(Germany) Füchse Berlin	28–32	28–34

===== Matches =====
26 March 2024; 20:45	RK Nexe (Croatia)	19–24	(Germany) Rhein-Neckar Löwen	Sportska dvorana kralja Tomislava, Našice; Attendance: 2,000; Referees: Andorka, Hucker (HUN)
26 March 2024; 20:45	Marguč 4	(11–13)	Reichmann 7	Sportska dvorana kralja Tomislava, Našice; Attendance: 2,000; Referees: Andorka, Hucker (HUN)
26 March 2024; 20:45	1× (yellow card) 1× (suspension)	Report	2× (yellow card)	Sportska dvorana kralja Tomislava, Našice; Attendance: 2,000; Referees: Andorka, Hucker (HUN)

2 April 2024; 20:45	Rhein-Neckar Löwen (Germany)	31–29	(Croatia) RK Nexe	SNP Dome, Heidelberg; Attendance: 2,974; Referees: Erdoğan, Özdeniz (TUR)
2 April 2024; 20:45	Kohlbacher 8	(16–16)	Bezjak, Vejin 7	SNP Dome, Heidelberg; Attendance: 2,974; Referees: Erdoğan, Özdeniz (TUR)
2 April 2024; 20:45	3× (suspension)	Report	3× (suspension)	SNP Dome, Heidelberg; Attendance: 2,974; Referees: Erdoğan, Özdeniz (TUR)

26 March 2024; 20:45	TSV Hannover-Burgdorf (Germany)	34–30	(Sweden) IK Sävehof	Swiss Life Hall, Hannover; Attendance: 2,305; Referees: Metalari, Nikolovski (MKD)
26 March 2024; 20:45	Edvardsson 8	(18–14)	Wedberg 12	Swiss Life Hall, Hannover; Attendance: 2,305; Referees: Metalari, Nikolovski (MKD)
26 March 2024; 20:45	3× (suspension)	Report	1× (yellow card) 2× (suspension)	Swiss Life Hall, Hannover; Attendance: 2,305; Referees: Metalari, Nikolovski (MKD)

2 April 2024; 18:45	IK Sävehof (Sweden)	34–25	(Germany) TSV Hannover-Burgdorf	Partille Arena, Partille; Attendance: 2,138; Referees: Bíró, Kiss (HUN)
2 April 2024; 18:45	Möller, Wedberg 7	(18–14)	Kulesh 6	Partille Arena, Partille; Attendance: 2,138; Referees: Bíró, Kiss (HUN)
2 April 2024; 18:45	1× (yellow card) 3× (suspension)	Report	5× (suspension)	Partille Arena, Partille; Attendance: 2,138; Referees: Bíró, Kiss (HUN)

26 March 2024; 18:45	Dinamo București (Romania)	37–34	(Denmark) Bjerringbro-Silkeborg	Dinamo Polyvalent Hall, Bucharest; Attendance: 2,300; Referees: Cacador, Nicolau (POR)
26 March 2024; 18:45	Rosta 9	(18–16)	Bogojevic, Lenbroch 7	Dinamo Polyvalent Hall, Bucharest; Attendance: 2,300; Referees: Cacador, Nicolau (POR)
26 March 2024; 18:45	1× (suspension)	Report	1× (yellow card) 2× (suspension)	Dinamo Polyvalent Hall, Bucharest; Attendance: 2,300; Referees: Cacador, Nicolau (POR)

2 April 2024; 18:45	Bjerringbro-Silkeborg (Denmark)	24–27	(Romania) Dinamo București	Jysk Arena, Silkeborg; Attendance: 1,811; Referees: Álvarez, Bustamante (ESP)
2 April 2024; 18:45	Hallbäck 6	(8–16)	Akimenko 7	Jysk Arena, Silkeborg; Attendance: 1,811; Referees: Álvarez, Bustamante (ESP)
2 April 2024; 18:45	1× (yellow card) 3× (suspension)	Report	2× (suspension)	Jysk Arena, Silkeborg; Attendance: 1,811; Referees: Álvarez, Bustamante (ESP)

26 March 2024; 18:45	Kadetten Schaffhausen (Switzerland)	28–32	(Germany) Füchse Berlin	BBC Arena, Schaffhausen; Attendance: 3,500; Referees: Vesovic, Mitrovic (MNE)
26 March 2024; 18:45	Martinović 7	(15–16)	Gidsel 9	BBC Arena, Schaffhausen; Attendance: 3,500; Referees: Vesovic, Mitrovic (MNE)
26 March 2024; 18:45	1× (yellow card) 3× (suspension)	Report	1× (yellow card) 4× (suspension)	BBC Arena, Schaffhausen; Attendance: 3,500; Referees: Vesovic, Mitrovic (MNE)

2 April 2024; 20:45	Füchse Berlin (Germany)	34–28	(Switzerland) Kadetten Schaffhausen	Max-Schmeling-Halle, Berlin; Attendance: 4,717; Referees: Kull, Tint (EST)
2 April 2024; 20:45	Gidsel, Lichtlein 7	(18–11)	Ríkharðsson 8	Max-Schmeling-Halle, Berlin; Attendance: 4,717; Referees: Kull, Tint (EST)
2 April 2024; 20:45	1× (yellow card) 3× (suspension)	Report	3× (suspension)	Max-Schmeling-Halle, Berlin; Attendance: 4,717; Referees: Kull, Tint (EST)

=== Quarterfinals ===
==== Overview ====
Team 1	Agg.	Team 2	1st leg	2nd leg
Füchse Berlin (Germany)	70–63	(France) HBC Nantes	33–33	37–30
Dinamo București (Romania)	66–61	(Denmark) Skjern Håndbold	28–27	38–34
IK Sävehof (Sweden)	59–69	(Germany) SG Flensburg-Handewitt	30–41	29–28
Rhein-Neckar Löwen (Germany)	60–58	(Portugal) Sporting CP	32–29	28–29

===== Matches =====
23 April 2024; 20:45	Füchse Berlin (Germany)	33–33	(France) HBC Nantes	Max-Schmeling-Halle, Berlin; Attendance: 7,179; Referees: Budzak, Zahradnik (SVK)
23 April 2024; 20:45	Gidsel 9	(17–15)	Minne 10	Max-Schmeling-Halle, Berlin; Attendance: 7,179; Referees: Budzak, Zahradnik (SVK)
23 April 2024; 20:45	2× (suspension)	Report	4× (suspension)	Max-Schmeling-Halle, Berlin; Attendance: 7,179; Referees: Budzak, Zahradnik (SVK)

30 April 2024; 20:45	HBC Nantes (France)	30–37	(Germany) Füchse Berlin	H Arena, Nantes; Attendance: 5,902; Referees: Leszczynski, Piechota (POL)
30 April 2024; 20:45	Rivera 6	(16–18)	Andersson 9	H Arena, Nantes; Attendance: 5,902; Referees: Leszczynski, Piechota (POL)
30 April 2024; 20:45	4× (suspension) 1× (red card)	Report	2× (suspension)	H Arena, Nantes; Attendance: 5,902; Referees: Leszczynski, Piechota (POL)

23 April 2024; 18:45	Dinamo București (Romania)	28–27	(Denmark) Skjern Håndbold	Dinamo Polyvalent Hall, Bucharest; Attendance: 2,538; Referees: Thiyagarajah, Thiyagarajah (GER)
23 April 2024; 18:45	Kukić 7	(14–15)	Nazaré 6	Dinamo Polyvalent Hall, Bucharest; Attendance: 2,538; Referees: Thiyagarajah, Thiyagarajah (GER)
23 April 2024; 18:45	4× (suspension)	Report	3× (suspension)	Dinamo Polyvalent Hall, Bucharest; Attendance: 2,538; Referees: Thiyagarajah, Thiyagarajah (GER)

30 April 2024; 18:45	Skjern Håndbold (Denmark)	34–38	(Romania) Dinamo București	Skjern Bank Arena, Skjern; Attendance: 3,178; Referees: Bolic, Hurich (AUT)
30 April 2024; 18:45	Gaudin 10	(12–20)	Kuduz 8	Skjern Bank Arena, Skjern; Attendance: 3,178; Referees: Bolic, Hurich (AUT)
30 April 2024; 18:45	3× (suspension) 1× (red card)	Report	3× (suspension) 1× (red card)	Skjern Bank Arena, Skjern; Attendance: 3,178; Referees: Bolic, Hurich (AUT)

23 April 2024; 18:45	IK Sävehof (Sweden)	30–41	(Germany) SG Flensburg-Handewitt	Partille Arena, Partille; Attendance: 4,408; Referees: Cindric, Gonzurek (CRO)
23 April 2024; 18:45	Berlin, Mittún 6	(14–22)	Jakobsen 9	Partille Arena, Partille; Attendance: 4,408; Referees: Cindric, Gonzurek (CRO)
23 April 2024; 18:45	2× (yellow card) 2× (suspension)	Report	1× (yellow card) 2× (suspension)	Partille Arena, Partille; Attendance: 4,408; Referees: Cindric, Gonzurek (CRO)

30 April 2024; 18:45	SG Flensburg-Handewitt (Germany)	28–29	(Sweden) IK Sävehof	Flens-Arena, Flensburg; Attendance: 4,825; Referees: Horváth, Marton (HUN)
30 April 2024; 18:45	three players 5	(11–15)	Westby 5	Flens-Arena, Flensburg; Attendance: 4,825; Referees: Horváth, Marton (HUN)
30 April 2024; 18:45	2× (yellow card) 3× (suspension)	Report	1× (yellow card) 2× (suspension)	Flens-Arena, Flensburg; Attendance: 4,825; Referees: Horváth, Marton (HUN)

23 April 2024; 20:45	Rhein-Neckar Löwen (Germany)	32–29	(Portugal) Sporting CP	SNP Dome, Heidelberg; Attendance: 2,773; Referees: Mitrevski, Todorovski (MKD)
23 April 2024; 20:45	Kirkeløkke 10	(19–14)	F. Costa 9	SNP Dome, Heidelberg; Attendance: 2,773; Referees: Mitrevski, Todorovski (MKD)
23 April 2024; 20:45	5× (suspension)	Report	2× (yellow card) 4× (suspension)	SNP Dome, Heidelberg; Attendance: 2,773; Referees: Mitrevski, Todorovski (MKD)

30 April 2024; 20:45	Sporting CP (Portugal)	29–28	(Germany) Rhein-Neckar Löwen	Pavilhão João Rocha, Lisbon; Attendance: 2,407; Referees: Tzaferopoulos, Bethmann (GRE)
30 April 2024; 20:45	F. Costa 11	(15–12)	Reichmann 7	Pavilhão João Rocha, Lisbon; Attendance: 2,407; Referees: Tzaferopoulos, Bethmann (GRE)
30 April 2024; 20:45	1× (yellow card) 6× (suspension)	Report	1× (yellow card) 4× (suspension)	Pavilhão João Rocha, Lisbon; Attendance: 2,407; Referees: Tzaferopoulos, Bethmann (GRE)

== Final Four ==
The final four will held at the Barclays Arena in Hamburg, Germany on 25 and 26 May 2024. The draw took place on 3 May 2024.

=== Bracket ===
Semi-finals
25 May
(Germany) SG Flensburg-Handewitt	38
(Romania) Dinamo București	32
25 May
(Germany) Rhein-Neckar Löwen	24
(Germany) Füchse Berlin	33

Final
26 May
(Germany) SG Flensburg-Handewitt	36
(Germany) Füchse Berlin	31
Third place
26 May
(Romania) Dinamo București	31
(Germany) Rhein-Neckar Löwen	32

=== Semifinals ===
25 May 2024; 15:00	SG Flensburg-Handewitt (Germany)	38–32	(Romania) Dinamo București	Barclays Arena, Hamburg; Attendance: 8,600; Referees: Mazeika, Gatelis (LIT)
25 May 2024; 15:00	Jakobsen 11	(18–11)	Akimenko 7	Barclays Arena, Hamburg; Attendance: 8,600; Referees: Mazeika, Gatelis (LIT)
25 May 2024; 15:00	1× (yellow card) 5× (suspension)	Report	1× (yellow card) 3× (suspension)	Barclays Arena, Hamburg; Attendance: 8,600; Referees: Mazeika, Gatelis (LIT)

25 May 2024; 18:00	Rhein-Neckar Löwen (Germany)	24–33	(Germany) Füchse Berlin	Barclays Arena, Hamburg; Attendance: 9,400; Referees: Jurinovic, Mrvica (CRO)
25 May 2024; 18:00	Knorr 7	(9–14)	Andersson, Gidsel 7	Barclays Arena, Hamburg; Attendance: 9,400; Referees: Jurinovic, Mrvica (CRO)
25 May 2024; 18:00	2× (suspension)	Report	1× (yellow card) 3× (suspension)	Barclays Arena, Hamburg; Attendance: 9,400; Referees: Jurinovic, Mrvica (CRO)

=== Third place game ===
26 May 2024; 15:00	Dinamo București (Romania)	31–32	(Germany) Rhein-Neckar Löwen	Barclays Arena, Hamburg; Attendance: 9,400; Referees: Budzak, Zahradnik (SVK)
26 May 2024; 15:00	Rosta 6	(15–18)	Kirkeløkke, Kohlbacher 6	Barclays Arena, Hamburg; Attendance: 9,400; Referees: Budzak, Zahradnik (SVK)
26 May 2024; 15:00	1× (suspension)	Report	1× (suspension)	Barclays Arena, Hamburg; Attendance: 9,400; Referees: Budzak, Zahradnik (SVK)

=== Final ===
26 May 2024; 18:00	SG Flensburg-Handewitt (Germany)	36–31	(Germany) Füchse Berlin	Barclays Arena, Hamburg; Attendance: 10,050; Referees: Álvarez, Bustamante (ESP)
26 May 2024; 18:00	Jakobsen 7	(15–14)	Tollbring 7	Barclays Arena, Hamburg; Attendance: 10,050; Referees: Álvarez, Bustamante (ESP)
26 May 2024; 18:00	2× (yellow card) 4× (suspension) 1× (red card)	Report	1× (yellow card) 4× (suspension) 1× (red card)	Barclays Arena, Hamburg; Attendance: 10,050; Referees: Álvarez, Bustamante (ESP)

== Top goalscorers ==
Rank	Player	Club	Goals
1	(Ukraine) Andrii Akimenko	(Romania) Dinamo București	95
2	(Denmark) Niclas Kirkeløkke	(Germany) Rhein-Neckar Löwen	94
3	(Germany) Juri Knorr	(Germany) Rhein-Neckar Löwen	91
4	(Denmark) Mathias Gidsel	(Germany) Füchse Berlin	82
5	(Denmark) Lasse Andersson	(Germany) Füchse Berlin	78
6	(Germany) Jannik Kohlbacher	(Germany) Rhein-Neckar Löwen	77
7	(Portugal) Francisco Costa	(Portugal) Sporting CP	72
7	(Sweden) Gustaf Wedberg	(Sweden) IK Sävehof	72
9	(Iceland) Óðinn Þór Ríkharðsson	(Switzerland) Kadetten Schaffhausen	71
10	(Denmark) Lasse Møller	(Germany) SG Flensburg-Handewitt	69

== See also ==
- 2023–24 EHF Champions League
- 2023–24 EHF European Cup
- 2023–24 Women's EHF Champions League
- 2023–24 Women's EHF European League
- 2023–24 Women's EHF European Cup
