= Ricardo Moreira =

Argentine footballer

Personal information
- Full name: Ricardo Ariel Moreira
- Date of birth: February 23, 1983 (age 43)
- Place of birth: Rosario, Argentina
- Height: 1.78 m (5 ft 10 in)
- Position: Full back

Senior career*
Years	Team	Apps	(Gls)
2003–2007	Rosario Central	90	(1)
2007–2009	Independiente	55	(0)
2010	Atlético Tucumán	11	(0)
2010–2012	Gimnasia LP	9	(0)
2012–2013	Tiro Federal	17	(1)
- * Club domestic league appearances and goals as of 4 May 2015

Ricardo Ariel Moreira (born February 23, 1983, in Rosario) is an Argentine footballer. He last played for Tiro Federal. He can play either as either a left-back or right-back.

== Career ==
Moreira started his playing career in 2003 with Rosario Central, he played over 100 games for the club in all competitions before joining Independiente in 2007. On 8 January 2010, Atlético Tucumán signed the Argentine defender from Club Atlético Independiente.
