= 2023–24 EHF European League qualification round =

Handball tournament qualifier

EHF European League qualification round
- 2023–24

Tournament information
- Sport: Handball
- Date: 26 August – 2 September 2023
- Teams: 10 (from 8 countries)

Tournament statistics
- Matches played: 10

The 2023–24 EHF European League qualification round decided the last five qualifiers for the newly revamped European League group stage.

== Format ==
Ten teams were split into five play offs. The play offs were held in a home and away format. Whoever has the highest score on aggregate won the tie and secured a place in the group stage.

== Teams ==
Location of teams of the 2023–24 EHF European League Qualification Round.
Orange: Play Off 1; Green: Play Off 2; Deep Pink: Play Off 3; Yellow: Play Off 4; Blue: Play Off 5.

Teams
(Germany) Rhein-Neckar Löwen
(Germany) TSV Hannover-Burgdorf
(North Macedonia) Vardar 1961
(Portugal) ABC Braga
(Portugal) Águas Santas Milaneza
(Romania) CSM Constanța
(Slovenia) RK Trimo Trebnje
(Spain) Fraikin BM Granollers
(Sweden) Ystads IF
(Switzerland) Pfadi Winterthur

== Draw ==
The draw took place on 18 July 2023 in Vienna, Austria at 11:00 CET. The bold text means which teams advanced.

Seeded	Unseeded
(Germany) **Rhein-Neckar Löwen** (Portugal) **ABC Braga** (Spain) Fraikin BM Granollers (Switzerland) **Pfadi Winterthur** (Sweden) Ystads IF	(North Macedonia) Vardar 1961 (Slovenia) RK Trimo Trebnje (Romania) **CSM Constanța** (Germany) **TSV Hannover-Burgdorf** (Portugal) Águas Santas Milaneza

== Scores ==
Team 1	Agg.	Team 2	1st leg	2nd leg
Ystads IF (Sweden)	49–63	(Germany) **TSV Hannover-Burgdorf**	28–33	21–30
RK Trimo Trebnje (Slovenia)	57–58	(Portugal) **ABC Braga**	31–29	26–29
Águas Santas Milaneza (Portugal)	43–44	(Switzerland) **Pfadi Winterthur**	24–22	19–22
Vardar 1961 (North Macedonia)	58–71	(Germany) **Rhein-Neckar Löwen**	25–34	33–37
**CSM Constanța** (Romania)	52–51	(Spain) Fraikin BM Granollers	27–29	25–22 PS

== Matches ==
All times are local.

26 August 2023; 16:00	**Ystads IF (Sweden)**	**28–33**	**(Germany) TSV Hannover-Burgdorf**	Ystad Arena, Ystad; Attendance: 1,022; Referees: Mitrovic, Vesovic (MNE)
26 August 2023; 16:00	Palmar 7	(12–15)	Uščins 9	Ystad Arena, Ystad; Attendance: 1,022; Referees: Mitrovic, Vesovic (MNE)
26 August 2023; 16:00	1× (yellow card)	Report	1× (yellow card)	Ystad Arena, Ystad; Attendance: 1,022; Referees: Mitrovic, Vesovic (MNE)

2 September 2023; 18:30	**TSV Hannover-Burgdorf (Germany)**	**30–21**	**(Sweden) Ystads IF**	ZAG-Arena, Hannover; Attendance: 2,969; Referees: Petursson, Thrastarson (ISL)
2 September 2023; 18:30	Edvardsson, Vujović 5	(11–10)	Palmar, Stankiewicz 5	ZAG-Arena, Hannover; Attendance: 2,969; Referees: Petursson, Thrastarson (ISL)
2 September 2023; 18:30	2× (suspension)	Report	1× (yellow card) 4× (suspension)	ZAG-Arena, Hannover; Attendance: 2,969; Referees: Petursson, Thrastarson (ISL)

TSV Hannover-Burgdorf won 63–49 on aggregate.

26 August 2023; 18:00	**RK Trimo Trebnje (Slovenia)**	**31–29**	**(Portugal) ABC Braga**	Dvorana OS Trebnje, Trebnje; Attendance: 600; Referees: Erdogan, Özdeniz (TUR)
26 August 2023; 18:00	Bulzamini 7	(14–14)	Silva 8	Dvorana OS Trebnje, Trebnje; Attendance: 600; Referees: Erdogan, Özdeniz (TUR)
26 August 2023; 18:00	4× (suspension)	Report	1× (yellow card) 4× (suspension)	Dvorana OS Trebnje, Trebnje; Attendance: 600; Referees: Erdogan, Özdeniz (TUR)

2 September 2023; 17:30	**ABC Braga (Portugal)**	**29–26**	**(Slovenia) RK Trimo Trebnje**	Pavilhão Flávio Sá Leite, Braga; Attendance: 1,500; Referees: Leszczynski, Piechota (POL)
2 September 2023; 17:30	Abrahão 8	(14–13)	Jurečič 7	Pavilhão Flávio Sá Leite, Braga; Attendance: 1,500; Referees: Leszczynski, Piechota (POL)
2 September 2023; 17:30	7× (suspension)	Report	1× (yellow card) 5× (suspension)	Pavilhão Flávio Sá Leite, Braga; Attendance: 1,500; Referees: Leszczynski, Piechota (POL)

ABC Braga won 58–57 on aggregate.

26 August 2023; 19:00	**Águas Santas Milaneza (Portugal)**	**24–22**	**(Switzerland) Pfadi Winterthur**	Associacao Atlética, Maia; Attendance: 1,500; Referees: Carmaux, Mursch (FRA)
26 August 2023; 19:00	Teixeira, Pegas 5	(12–15)	Leopold 7	Associacao Atlética, Maia; Attendance: 1,500; Referees: Carmaux, Mursch (FRA)
26 August 2023; 19:00	1× (yellow card) 3× (suspension)	Report	3× (suspension)	Associacao Atlética, Maia; Attendance: 1,500; Referees: Carmaux, Mursch (FRA)

3 September 2023; 17:00	**Pfadi Winterthur (Switzerland)**	**22–19**	**(Portugal) Águas Santas Milaneza**	AXA Arena, Winterthur; Attendance: 613; Referees: Covalciuc, Covalciuc (MOL)
3 September 2023; 17:00	Dragaševic, Leopold 7	(16–11)	Cruz 5	AXA Arena, Winterthur; Attendance: 613; Referees: Covalciuc, Covalciuc (MOL)
3 September 2023; 17:00	4× (suspension)	Report	1× (yellow card) 4× (suspension)	AXA Arena, Winterthur; Attendance: 613; Referees: Covalciuc, Covalciuc (MOL)

Pfadi Winterthur won 44–43 on aggregate.

26 August 2023; 19:00	**Vardar 1961 (North Macedonia)**	**25–34**	**(Germany) Rhein-Neckar Löwen**	Jane Sandanski Arena, Skopje; Attendance: 2,800; Referees: Kull, Tint (EST)
26 August 2023; 19:00	Srdanović, Lazarevski 5	(14–14)	Knorr 8	Jane Sandanski Arena, Skopje; Attendance: 2,800; Referees: Kull, Tint (EST)
26 August 2023; 19:00	3× (suspension)	Report	3× (suspension)	Jane Sandanski Arena, Skopje; Attendance: 2,800; Referees: Kull, Tint (EST)

3 September 2023; 16:00	**Rhein-Neckar Löwen (Germany)**	**37–33**	**(North Macedonia) Vardar 1961**	SNP Dome, Heidelberg; Attendance: 3,018; Referees: Cernavskis, Bogdanovs (LAT)
3 September 2023; 16:00	three players 7	(17–17)	Lazarevski 7	SNP Dome, Heidelberg; Attendance: 3,018; Referees: Cernavskis, Bogdanovs (LAT)
3 September 2023; 16:00	1× (yellow card) 2× (suspension)	Report	1× (yellow card) 2× (suspension)	SNP Dome, Heidelberg; Attendance: 3,018; Referees: Cernavskis, Bogdanovs (LAT)

Rhein-Neckar Löwen won 71–58 on aggregate.

27 August 2023; 17:00	**CSM Constanța (Romania)**	**27–29**	**(Spain) Fraikin BM Granollers**	Sala Sporturilor, Constanța; Attendance: 1,200; Referees: Tzaferopoulos, Bethmann (GRE)
27 August 2023; 17:00	Komogorov 6	(14–16)	Franco Miró 6	Sala Sporturilor, Constanța; Attendance: 1,200; Referees: Tzaferopoulos, Bethmann (GRE)
27 August 2023; 17:00	1× (yellow card) 3× (suspension) 1× (red card)	Report	2× (yellow card) 4× (suspension)	Sala Sporturilor, Constanța; Attendance: 1,200; Referees: Tzaferopoulos, Bethmann (GRE)

2 September 2023
12:10
Fraikin BM Granollers (Spain)
**22–25**
(Romania) CSM Constanța
Palau d'Esports de Granollers, Granollers
Attendance: 1,800
Referees: Jović, Arnautović (BIH)
Franco Miró 6
(10–14)
Ravnić 8
4× (suspension)
Report
1× (yellow card) 5× (suspension) 1× (red card)

FT: 18–20 Pen: 4–5

CSM Constanța won 52–51 on aggregate.
