= Viktor Östlund =

Swedish handball player (born 1992)

Personal information
- Nationality: Swedish
- Born: 19 January 1992 (age 34) Märsta, Sweden
- Height: 1.98 m (6 ft 6 in)

Sport
- Sport: Handball
- Position: Left back
- Current club: HK Malmö
- Number: 22

Senior clubs
- Years: Team
- –2016: Eskilstuna Guif
- 2016–2019: TTH Holstebro
- 2019–: HK Malmö
National team
Years	Team	Apps	(Gls)
2015–	Sweden	38	(96)
Medal record
European Championship
Silver medal – second place	2018 Croatia

Viktor Östlund (born 19 January 1992) is a Swedish handball player for HK Malmö and the Swedish national team.
