= Pfadi Winterthur =

Swiss handball club

- Full name: Pfadi Winterthur
- Short name: Pfadi
- Founded: 1938; 88 years ago
- Arena: Winterthur Central Sports Hall
- Capacity: 2,000
- President: Jürg Hofmann
- Head coach: Goran Cvetkovic
- League: Swiss Handball League
- 2020–21: 1st
- Club colours
Home	Away

Location of Pfadi Winterthur

Pfadi Winterthur is a team handball club from Switzerland. Currently, Pfadi Winterthur competes in the Swiss First League of Handball.

The club developed out of an informal handball team which won the competitions during the national jamboree of the Schweizer Pfadfinderbund in 1938. The prefix Pfadi (Scout) commemorates the club's roots in the Scout Movement.

== Crest, colours, supporters ==
=== Kits ===
HOME
2013–14	2014–15

AWAY

2011–12

== Honours ==
- Swiss champion: 1992, 1994, 1995, 1996, 1997, 1998, 2002, 2003, 2004, 2021.
- Swiss Cup (SHV-Cup) winner: 1998, 2003, 2010, 2015, 2018.
- Swiss SuperCup winner: 2004, 2018, 2021.
- Swiss field handball-Cup winner: 1958, 1998, 2001.
- EHF Challenge Cup finalist: 2001.
- EHF Cup semifinalist: 1982.
- Euro City Cup semifinalist: 2000 (successor after 2000: EHF Challenge Cup)
- EHF Champions League quarterfinalist: 1997, 1998, 2003.

== Sports Hall information ==
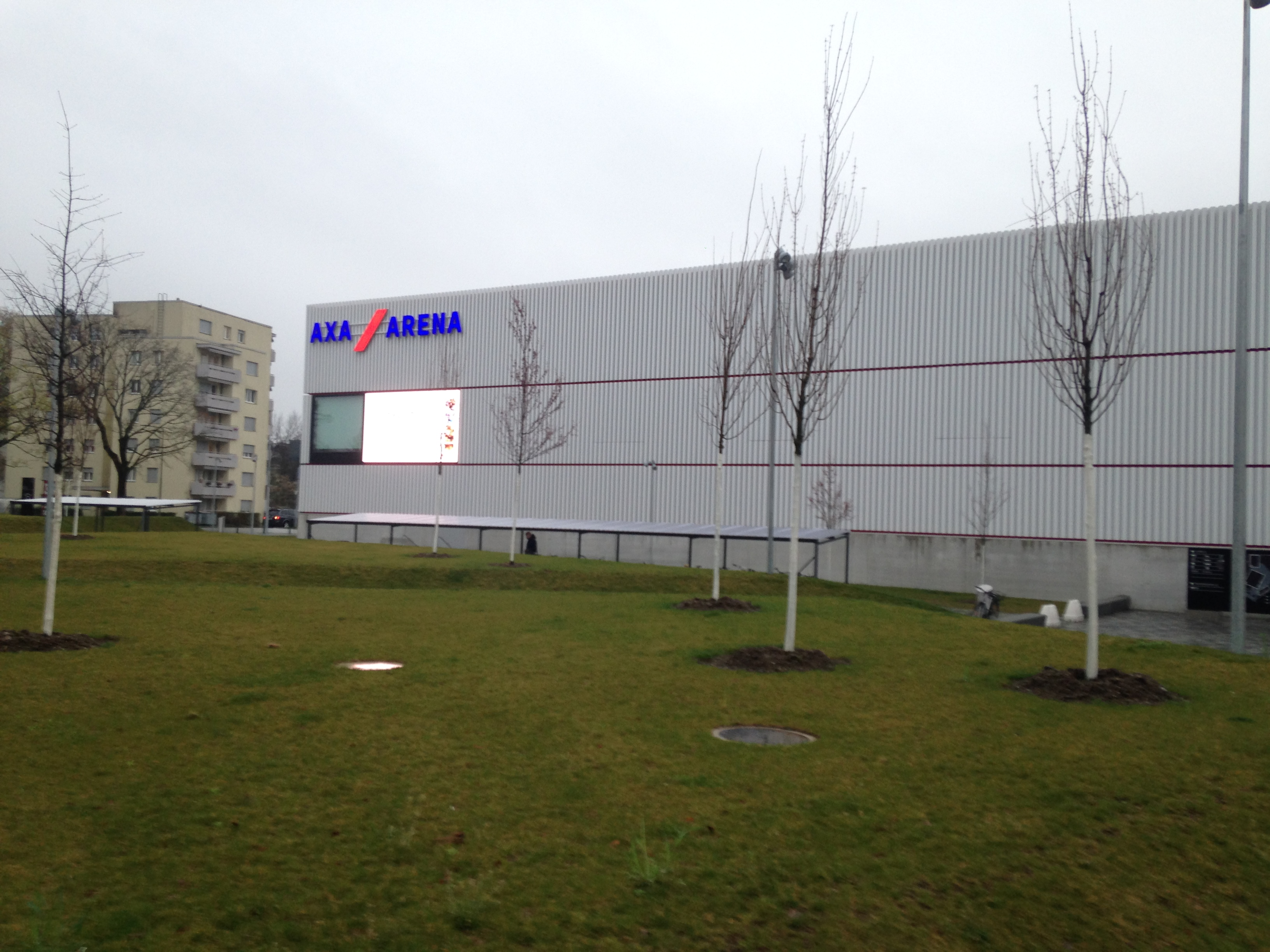
Home hall: Winterthur Central Sports Hall

- Arena: – Winterthur Central Sports Hall
- City: – Winterthur
- Capacity: – 2000
- Address: – Grüzefeldstrasse 32, 8400 Winterthur

== European record ==
=== EHF European League ===
Season	Round	Club	Home	Away	Aggregate
2020–21	1QR	Handball Esch	33–30	Cancelled	33–30
2020–21	2QR	GOG Håndbold	35–31	24–33	59–64
2021–22	Group Stage (Group A)	Wisła Płock	27–35	23–35	6th place
2021–22	Group Stage (Group A)	Fenix Toulouse	27–34	27–30	6th place
2021–22	Group Stage (Group A)	Füchse Berlin	27–30	29–35	6th place
2021–22	Group Stage (Group A)	Bidasoa Irun	23–37	28–32	6th place
2021–22	Group Stage (Group A)	Tatran Prešov	27–31	33–29	6th place
2023–24	QR	Águas Santas Milaneza	22–19	22–24	44–43
2023–24	Group Stage (Group C)	RK Gorenje Velenje	32–31	26–34	4th place
2023–24	Group Stage (Group C)	REBI BM Cuenca	32–28	24–28	4th place
2023–24	Group Stage (Group C)	IK Sävehof	29–32	20–41	4th place

=== EHF European Cup ===
Season	Round	Club	Home	Away	Aggregate
2024–25	R2	RK Sloboda	24–26	29–20	53–46
2024–25	R3	Anorthosis Famagusta	36–32	28–37	64–69
2026–27	R2	HIFK	39–32	42–32	81–64
2026–27	R3	RK Trimo Trebnje	–	–	–

== Current squad ==
Squad for the 2022–23 season

Goalkeepers

- 12 (Switzerland) Dennis Wipf
- 16 (Bosnia and Herzegovina) Admir Ahmetasevic

Left wingers

- 21 (Switzerland) Joël Bräm
- 35 (Switzerland) Noam Leopold

Right wingers

- 4 (Switzerland) Lukas Osterwalder
- 6 (Switzerland) Cédrie Tynowski

Line players

- 26 (Sweden) Otto Lagerquist
- 31 (Switzerland) Henri Dörflinger
- 55 (Portugal) Eduardo Mendonca

Left backs

- 5 (Norway) Henrik Schönfeldt
- 17 (Switzerland) Lukas Heer
- 24 (Spain) Viran Morros
- 33 (Algeria) Moustafa Sadok

Central backs

- 11 (Switzerland) Gian-Luca Bühlmann
- 20 (Switzerland) Kevin Jud
- 41 (Switzerland) Alessio Lioi

Right backs

- 19 (Serbia) Aleksandr Radovanovic
- 22 (Switzerland) Stefan Freivogel
- 34 (Switzerland) Dominik Ruh

=== Transfers ===
Transfers for the 2026–27 season

Joining

Leaving

- (Denmark) Oliver Eggert (LB) to (Denmark) TM Tønder
- (Switzerland) Niclas Mierzwa (LW) to (Germany) Rhein-Neckar Löwen
- (Switzerland) Alessio Lioi (CB) to (Switzerland) HSC Suhr Aarau

=== Transfer History ===
Transfers for the 2025–26 season

Joining

- (Germany) Lukas Köder (RW) from (Germany) HSG Konstanz
- (Switzerland) Mehdi Ben Romdhane (CB) from (Switzerland) Kadetten Schaffhausen
- (Switzerland) (Ukraine) Daniel Parkhomenko (RB) from (Switzerland) HSC Suhr Aarau

Leaving

- (Serbia) Aleksandar Radovanović (RB) to (Switzerland) SG Wadenswil/Horgen
- (Switzerland) Laurin Rinderknecht (CB) to (Switzerland) Handball Stäfa

== Notable former players ==
- (South Korea) Paek Won-chul
- (South Korea) Cho Chi-hyo
- (South Korea) Kang Jae-won
- (Denmark) Erik Veje Rasmussen
- (Denmark) Hans Hattesen
- (Switzerland) Marc Baumgartner
- (Argentina) Matías Schulz
- (Norway) Morten Schønfeldt
- (Germany) Markus Baur
- (Serbia) Goran Cvetković
