= Metro 2033 =

Metro 2033 may refer to:

- Metro 2033 (novel), a 2002 novel by Russian author Dmitry Glukhovsky
- Metro 2033 (video game), a 2010 first-person shooter video game based on the novel

== See also ==
- Metro (franchise), originating from the 2005 novel
