= Metro 2035 =

Russian post-apocalyptic novel

- Original Russian cover art
- Author: Dmitry Glukhovsky
- Language: Russian (original)
- Series: Metro
- Genre: Post-apocalyptic
- Publisher: AST
- Publication date: 12 June 2015
- Publication place: Russia
- Media type: Print (hardcover and paperback); E-book; Audiobook
- Pages: 384 (Russian edition); 502 (English edition)
- ISBN: 978-5-17-090538-6
- Preceded by: Metro 2034

Metro 2035 (Russian: Метро 2035) is a 2015 post-apocalyptic science fiction novel by Russian author Dmitry Glukhovsky. Glukhovsky's third book in the core Metro series, it serves as a sequel to Metro 2033 and Metro 2034. Like previous novels in the series, Metro 2035 is primarily set in the Moscow Metro and the ruins of Moscow itself in the aftermath of a nuclear apocalypse. 2035 follows Artyom, the protagonist of Metro 2033, as he attempts to make contact with other survivors in the world. Metro 2035 is partially inspired by the video game Metro: Last Light. In turn, Metro Exodus is a game loosely based on Metro 2035.

== Plot ==
Two years after Metro 2033, Artyom has left the Spartan Order and now lives at his home station, VDNKh, with his wife Anya. Claiming to have heard a radio message in Ostankino Tower, Artyom attempts to make contact with other survivors in the world by broadcasting radio messages on the highly irradiated surface, but never receives any response. Anya considers Artyom's efforts fruitless, and his refusal to have children with her causes their relationship to deteriorate. Homer, a major character in Metro 2034, arrives at the station to write a book about Artyom's conflict with the Dark Ones. Artyom initially refuses to help Homer, but changes his mind after Homer claims that he met a man at Teatralnaya who made radio contact with Polar Dawns, a city on the Kola Peninsula. Artyom and Homer set out towards Teatralnaya. Lyokha, a dung broker from Rizhskaya, helps them cross the border of Hansa, a capitalist faction controlling the Koltsevaya line. After visiting a brothel in Tsvetnoy Bulvar, the three men arrive at Tverskaya, renamed “Darwin” by the neo-Nazi Fourth Reich, and are arrested shortly afterward. A Reich officer threatens to kill Homer if Artyom refuses to bomb the passageway leading from neutral Teatralnaya to Okhotny Ryad, which is controlled by the communist Red Line. Artyom finds the radio operator that Homer mentioned at Teatralnaya, but Red Line soldiers take the man to Okhotny Ryad and execute him before Artyom can speak to him. Informed by other Red Line prisoners that the Metro has allegedly been visited by outsiders, Artyom uses the Reich bomb to escape to the surface, where he experiences a strange vision of a fantasy Moscow.

Artyom arrives at Polis, a union of four stations and the headquarters of the Spartan Order. Miller, leader of the Order and Anya's father, tasks Artyom and his Spartan friend Letyaga with delivering a message to the Reich's Führer. After Letyaga informs the Reich guards that the letter is actually from someone named “Bessolov”, Artyom is taken to Schiller (formerly Pushkinskaya), where he is forced to do manual labor with other Reich captives, including Homer and Lyokha. Homer states that Artyom's visions of an alternate Moscow are how Sasha, a young girl who seemingly died at the end of 2034, envisioned pre-war life; Artyom realizes that he saw a girl fitting Homer's description of Sasha at the brothel in Tsvetnoy Bulvar. One of the prisoners at Schiller reveals that a base supposedly exists on the surface at Balashikha. Artyom and Lyokha escape and return to Tsvetnoy Bulvar, where a heavily irradiated Artyom meets Sasha, now a prostitute in the service of “Bessolov”. Sasha and Artyom have a brief affair; she tells him that he likely only has three weeks to live because of his exposure to radiation.

Accompanied by Lyokha and a surface explorer named Savelii, Artyom discovers the Balashikha outpost and kills the men inside. He sees what he assumes is radio equipment, but is unable to operate it and damages it in frustration. Savelii's car radio starts playing messages from around the world, revealing that the outpost contained a jammer that was preventing radio signals from being heard in Moscow. A group of men arrive at the outpost, claiming to be from Murom, where the air is breathable and crops can grow on the surface. Letyaga arrives and executes the Muromers, saying that Russia is still at war with the West and that the Muromers were spies. Miller reveals that the jammer is a joint Spartan-Hansa operation, allegedly intended to prevent enemy forces from discovering that Moscow is still inhabited. Miller accepts Artyom, Lyokha, and Savelii into the Order and tasks them with delivering ammunition to Hansa. Artyom recognizes the Hansa men as Red Line soldiers in disguise; they subsequently use the ammo to massacre a crowd of refugees, who trample and kill Savelii. Letyaga reveals that Miller asked him to kill Artyom, but changes his mind and helps Artyom escape.

Increasingly suspicious of the role of “Bessolov”, Artyom goes to Tsvetnoy Bulvar to kill him but passes out in Sasha's room. He awakens in Tagansky Protected Command Point, a former government bunker, and has received treatment for his radiation. He speaks with Bessolov, a high-ranking official in the remnants of the Russian government, who reveals that his organization secretly controls the Metro's main factions and keeps people confined to the Metro to preserve civilization. Disgusted, Artyom asks to be taken back to the Metro, where he is informed by Sasha that the Order has captured his allies. Sasha refuses to accompany Artyom, stating that she loves Bessolov. Arrested by the Order upon his arrival in Polis, Artyom is subjected to a comrades' court alongside Lyokha and Letyaga, with Homer serving as a witness. At the court, Letyaga criticizes Miller and is shot and killed, sparking a fight. Artyom attempts to escape, but stays behind after Miller's men threaten to kill Anya. Homer supposedly heads to the Reich to print pamphlets telling the truth about the Metro while Lyokha travels to Tsvetnoy Bulvar to capture Bessolov. The leader of Polis reveals to the people that other survivors have been detected, but claims that the war with the West is still ongoing, necessitating cooperation between the Metro's major factions. Lyokha reveals that he has accepted an offer from Bessolov to join the bunker group, while Homer admits that he has decided to settle in Polis instead of traveling to the Reich. Artyom and Anya escape to the surface and use Savelii's car to travel to VDNKh, where Artyom unsuccessfully attempts to convince others to go with him to Murom. Artyom and Anya leave the Metro and set off for Vladivostok, the childhood home of Anya's mother. In the afterword, Lyokha sees Artyom and Anya leaving Moscow, but Bessolov tells him to let them go.

== History ==
Joystiq first mentioned the name of the book in an article posted on 1 March 2013. The article claimed that the book will be written by Dmitry Glukhovsky and will also be available outside of Russia. On 23 March 2013, during PAX East 2013, Glukhovsky himself detailed some of the story aspects of the video game Metro: Last Light and also revealed that he was writing a new book set in the Metro universe, titled Metro 2035, confirming the news at Joystiq. The novel was described as telling the same story as Metro: Last Light – thus once again casting Artyom as the protagonist – but in greater detail and length than the game itself. The writer stated that while writing the plot and dialogues for the game, the story outgrew the framework of a video game so he decided to write a book about it. In April 2014, Glukhovsky stated via Twitter: "The time has come to admit: Metro 2035 is in works and could be released in Russian later this year", however the book was not published in 2014 and the final release date was only to be revealed the following year. In March 2015, Glukhovsky posted an image on Instagram of working cover art for Metro 2035 and told his followers that the full print version of the novel was going to arrive in June 2015. Two months later, Glukhovsky posted the final version of the cover art on Instagram and announced that the novel is finally complete.

Starting in March 2015, chapters of Metro 2035 were published daily in the free newspaper Metro distributed in subways of the seven biggest Russian cities – starting with Saint Petersburg. On 12 June 2015 (when the book was finally published in Russia), the official website for Polish readers of Uniwersum Metro 2033 revealed that work on the Polish translation of the book was already at a very advanced stage. Insignis, the Polish publisher, aimed to release the translated version in autumn of 2015 and made good on its promise when Metro 2035 hit the shelves of Polish bookshops on 4 November 2015 – like Piter, the novel was translated from Russian to Polish by Paweł Podmiotko. By the end of the same month, a Hungarian translation by József Goretity was printed by Európa Könyvkiadó. Shortly thereafter, the author stated that an English language version of the book will not be out until 2016 at the earliest (this was later confirmed by an English cover reveal and announcement of plans to publish the translation by Christmas of 2016). The English edition finally arrived in early December 2016.
