= Tullio Avoledo =

Italian novelist

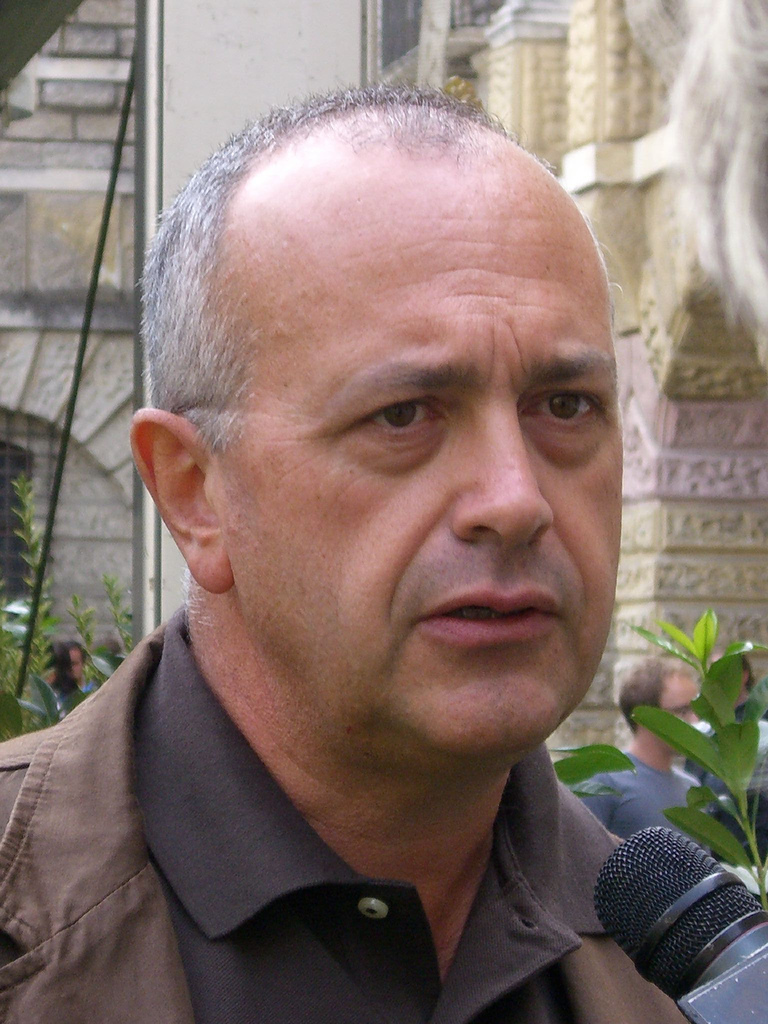
Tullio Avoledo

Tullio Avoledo (born 1 June 1957) is an Italian novelist.

== Biography ==
Avoledo was born in Valvasone, in Friuli. After earning a degree in law, he worked as a legal counselor for banks.

His first novel, L'elenco telefonico di Atlantide, was released in January 2003 by the minor Italian publisher Sironi. It turned into a best-seller and won the Fort Village Montblanc Award for the best debutant writer. Avoledo could pull the reader into a science-fictional narrative involving a mysterious global plot and a character modeled on himself. Mare di Bering, his second novel, was published in November of the same year.

His last novel for Sironi was Lo stato dell'unione in 2005. In the same year his first novel for Einaudi, one of the most renowned Italian publishers (which had also issued pocket editions of the former two), was released, under the title Tre sono le cose misteriose. Avoledo won the prestigious Grinzane Award with this fourth book in 2006.

The following Breve storia di lunghi tradimenti loosely alludes to characters (like Giulio Rovedo and Cecilia Mazzi) and situations of L'elenco telefonico di Atlantide, but it has a new plot set in a world of global economics and of industrial delocalization. A movie inspired by this novel was released in 2013.

La ragazza di Vajont is set in a dystopian alternate Italy dominated by a fascist regime, and plunged into a seemingly endless winter.

L'ultimo giorno felice is a short novel which Avoledo wrote for Legambiente, an Italian environmental organization. The plot is centered on the predicament of a young architect, Francesco Salvador, selling his soul to the mafia for money. The novel describes the last hours of Francesco, during an exclusive tour of the Venetian lagoon.

Science fiction is often present in the works of Avoledo. Avoledo's novel L'anno dei dodici inverni (2009) deals with time travel, love and redemption, in a mix of science fiction themes and a realistic narrative approach to the feelings and emotions of the characters. In 2011 he published another science fiction novel, Un buon posto per morire, in collaboration with Davide "Boosta" Dileo, keyboard player of the Turinese band Subsonica. The novel won the Emilio Salgari Prize 2012 for best Italian adventure novel.

He also wrote Metro 2033: Le radici del cielo, and Metro 2033: La crociata dei bambini written for the Metro 2033 Universe project set up by Dmitry Glukhovski. Both books have been published in Italy by Multiplayer.it. The last novel of the Metro 2033 trilogy - Metro 2033: Il Conclave delle tenebre will be published in 2018.

Tullio Avoledo ran for the Italian Senate at the national elections on March 5, 2018, as a member of the Friulan party "Patto per l'Autonomia".

His novel Nero come la notte (Marsilio, 2020) won the Scerbanenco Award for the best Italian crime novel.

The last novel by Avoledo is Non è mai notte quando muori published by Marsilio in 2022.

== Bibliography ==
- L'elenco telefonico di Atlantide (2003)
- Mare di Bering (2003)
- Lo stato dell'unione (2005)
- Tre sono le cose misteriose (2005)
- Breve storia di lunghi tradimenti (2007)
- The Girl from Vajont (La ragazza di Vajont, 2008), Troubadour, 2013.
- L'ultimo giorno felice (2008)
- L'anno dei dodici inverni (2009)
- Un buon posto per morire (2011)
- Le radici del Cielo (Universe of Metro 2033) (2012)
- La crociata dei bambini (Universe of Metro 2033) (2014)
- Chiedi alla luce (2016)
- Конклав тьмы (Dark Conclave, Universe of Metro 2035) (2018).
- Furland® (2018)
- Nero come la notte (2020)
- Come navi nella notte (2021)
- Non è mai notte quando muori (2022)
