= People's Press (Denmark) =

Publishing house in Denmark

- Status: Active
- Founded: 2002
- Country of origin: Denmark
- Headquarters location: Copenhagen
- Owner: Storytel
- Official website: peoplespress.dk

People's Press is a Denmark-based publishing house headquartered in Copenhagen. In March 2017, Swedish e-book company Storytel acquired 100% of shares in the publishing house at the cost of $10.72 million on debt-free basis.

Founded in 2002, People's Press publishes about 100 books annually and has a backlist of over 1,200 titles. Prior to Storytel's acquisition, the publisher has been part of People Group.
