= Arktika.1 =

2017 video game

- Developer: 4A Games
- Publisher: Oculus Studios
- Engine: 4A Engine
- Platform: Oculus Rift
- Release: October 10, 2017
- Genre: First-person shooter
- Mode: Single-player

Arktika.1 is a virtual reality first-person shooter developed by 4A Games and published by Oculus Studios. The game was released in October 2017 for Oculus Rift.

== Gameplay ==
Arktika.1 is a first-person shooter. The game is set in the far future in which Earth has fallen into a new ice age. The player assumes control of an elite mercenary tasked with protecting a settlement named Arktika.1 (based in modern-day Russia) from bandits and beasts known as "yagas". The player has the ability to dual wield weapons and quickly teleport short distances to progress or dodge from attacks. The game features ten different weapons, and they can be customized with various attachments to enhance their efficiency. The game utilizes the Oculus Touch motion controller. Players have to use their hands (holding the Touch controller) to aim and shoot, while physically bending down to hide behind cover.

== Development ==
The game was announced by 4A Games in October 2016. Jon Bloch, executive producer of the game, described Arktika.1 as a "significant sized game" and a AAA production. Since the team was not experienced in making virtual reality games, the studio decided to set it in post-apocalyptic Russia, a setting that the team was very familiar with after working on two Metro games. The studio worked on the project for two years. The game was released worldwide for Oculus Rift on October 10, 2017.

== Reception ==
The game received "mixed or average" reviews upon release, according to review aggregator Metacritic. Writing for UploadVR, Jamie Feltham noted that the game was longer than other VR shooters in the market and wrote that Arktika.1 was “extremely polished", but he was disappointed by the repetitive mission design and unbalanced weapons. Jason D'Aprile from GameSpot praised the game's implementation of motion control using the Touch controller and felt that it was an immersive title. He concluded his review by saying that "the mix of excellent graphics and surprisingly intense battles makes this one of the more enjoyable action games available on Rift".
