= Piter (novel) =

2010 novel by Shimun Vrochek

- Cover of the Polish version of the book
- Author: Shimun Vrochek
- Language: Russian (Original), Polish, German and Spanish
- Series: Metro
- Genre: Post-apocalyptic
- Publication date: February 2010
- Publication place: Russia
- Media type: Print (Hardcover and Paperback)
- Pages: 384 (Russian original); 595 (Polish version); 624 (German version)
- Followed by: "Piter. War"

Piter (Russian: Питер) is a novel written by Russian author Shimun Vrochek. Piter is part of Universe of Metro 2033, a long-running series of post-apocalyptic short stories, novellas, and novels, spanning a variety of genres. The works are written by several different authors. Piter was originally published in February 2010. Although there is currently no English version of the book, Piter has been translated into a number of other European languages, such as German, Polish and Spanish. The novel was translated to Polish by Paweł Podmiotko.

The book itself is different from Dmitry Glukhovsky's original works, giving the reader a look at what happened after the Catastrophe in another part of Russia, whilst maintaining the original ideas and atmosphere behind Metro 2033. It is one of the longer novels in the Universe series. Piter is featured as an Easter egg in the video game adaptation of Metro 2033, where a 3D model of the book can be found laying on the rail cart near the end of the level Armory, during chapter 3 of the game's story.

== Synopsis ==
Just like the people of Moscow in the fictional world of Metro 2033, a fraction of St. Petersburg's citizens fled to the tunnels of their hometown's metro moments before the nuclear bombs were dropped on the city. Piter (Russian slang for St. Petersburg) tells the story of Ivan Merkulov, a twenty-six-year-old fighter and stalker who experiences many trials and adventures as he travels through places both within the subway system of Saint Petersburg, as well as those above on the surface of post-apocalyptic Earth. The novel begins with the protagonist about to get married. The ceremony is interrupted when the engine-generator that powers the necessities of life on Vasileostrovskaya (Ivan's home station) is stolen. Sozonov - friend and member of Merkulov's team of stalkers - believes that the residents of several nearby stations, who originate from Moscow, are responsible for the crime. A war begins between those stations and an alliance that Vasileostrovskaya is part of.

As is revealed later on in the story, things are much more complex than Ivan thought. He is dragged into something much larger than the local conflict between the two factions, and the lines between friend and foe become very blurry as he continues his task. Merkulov's mission takes him to various locations, through numerous dangers and oddities, as he travels through the metro and beyond.

== Reception ==
In Russia, Piter was received with mostly positive feedback from critics and fans of the book series alike. Although some believed that it was written in a very similar style to that of the original author of Metro 2033, others thought the exact opposite and claimed that the novel was "teenage drivel" (even though Shimun Vrochek is older than Dmitry Glukhovsky). Piter was also met with positive responses from Polish readers. Critics from the Fantasta.pl website claimed that Piter is "a worthy representative of post-apocalyptic literature" and is easy to read for those who have never read a book from the Metro series before. Editor Monika "Katriona" Doerre, from kawerna.pl, recommended Piter for fans of the Fallout and Hellgate video game series.

== Legacy ==
Shimun Vrochek published the sequel novel Piter. War. (Вселенная Метро 2033: Питер. Война.) in 2018, followed one year later by Piter. Battle of the Twins (Вселенная Метро 2033: Питер. Битва близнецов).
