= Cat Bordhi =

American author, knitter, teacher, and designer (1951–2020)

Cat Bordhi (1951-2020) was an American author, accomplished knitter, teacher, and designer.

Born Kathryn Anne Elizabeth Gardiner on March 2, 1951, in San Francisco, Bordhi was raised by adoptive parents after her mother died of cancer and her father died by suicide. She attended the University of Santa Barbara and graduated with a degree in Russian literature and language. She married Louis Bordi in 1981; they divorced in 1985, and she changed the spelling of her name to Catherine and then Cat and added an “h” to her married name to assert her individualism in her publishing career.

== Knitting career ==
Bordhi augmented her income as a seamstress and public school teacher at the Friday Harbour Elementary School and Friday Harbor Middle School, by making teddy bears with movable joints, known as “Chocolate Bears.”

In 2002 she published Socks Soar on Two Circular Needles: A Manual of Elegant Knitting Techniques and Patterns which reached #64 on Amazon. It was the first sock book to teach knitting with two circular needles, and offered knitters a way to gain more control of the design. She then released additional publications including A Treasury of Magical Knitting and A Second Treasury of Magical Knitting. Her books introduced new and simplified techniques for knitting traditional garments like socks, scarves, and hats.

Her 2004 fiction book, Treasure Forest, was awarded the Nautilus Award for Best Young Adult Fiction. Her YouTube tutorials for knitting have over a million views and she taught at the Institute of Forensic Knitting.

She developed and hosted fiber-arts retreats in Friday Harbor, and she organized group knitting travel experiences around the world.
