= Robert J. Szmidt =

Polish writer

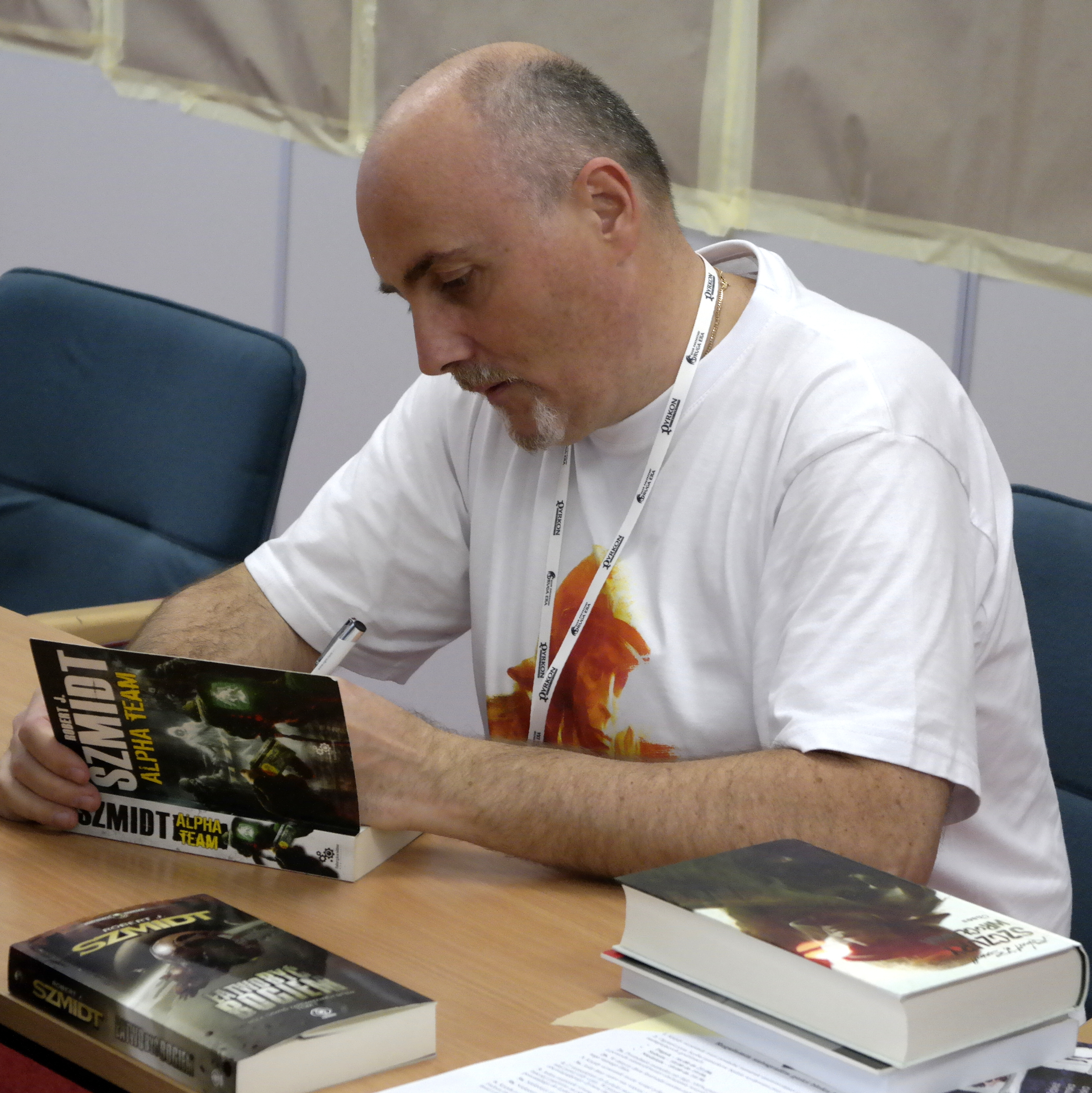

Robert Jerzy Szmidt (born 26 July 1962 in Wrocław, Poland) is a Polish science fiction and fantasy writer, translator and journalist.

== Biography ==
Szmidt trained as a sailor, however, he never worked as one. In the late 80s and early 90s, he was a sales representative for Amber Publishing House, and worked in the video and bookselling business. He was also the owner of one of the first legal video rentals in Poland. In late 80s he founded two magazines: Video Business and Video Premiery. Afterwards he moved into video games publishing (editor of PlayStation Plus and Player Station Plus magazines). He has also been a translator of English fantastika works to Polish since 1980s.

Robert Szmidt joined the Polish Science Fiction fandom in the early 80s and soon became a co-founder of the Sphinx Award, which later was renamed the Zajdel Award.

In 1985 he was awarded the Śląkfa Prize as The Fan Of The Year. In 2015 he received the award Wrocławianin Roku, and in 2017 and 2018 a Silver and Gold, respectively, Odznaka Honorowa Zasłużony dla Województwa Dolnośląskiego.

He founded the Science Fiction magazine (2000) and Nautilus Award (2004).

He was a publisher and editor in chief of the Science Fiction, Fantasy & Horror monthly magazine.

Szmidt has lived in Katowice, Poland, since 1986.

== Bibliography ==
=== Novels ===
- Toy Land, "Science Fiction" No. 11 / 2002, Fabryka Słów, Lublin 2008
- Revelation by Mr. John (Apokalipsa według Pana Jana), D.W. Ares, Katowice 2003; Fabryka Słów, Lublin 2008
- Whisperer (Zaklinacz), D.W. Ares, Katowice 2003
- Unicorn Chronicles: Hunting (Kroniki Jednorożca: Polowanie), Fabryka Słów, Lublin 2007
- Szczury Wrocławia: Chaos (Wrocław Rats: Chaos)

=== Metro 2033 series ===
Schmidt wrote three books which were included in the official Universe of Metro 2033 and Universe of Metro 2035

- Otchłań (The Abyss), Insignis, Kraków 2015
- Wieża (The Tower), Insignis, Kraków 2016
- Riese (The Giant), Insignis Media, Kraków 2019

=== Books translated ===
- Campbell, Jack; Lost fleet: Fearless, Fabryka Słów, Lublin 2008
- Campbell, Jack; Lost fleet: Fearless, Fabryka Słów, Lublin 2008
- Church, James; Death in the Koryo, Książnica, Katowice 2008
- Gibson, William; Spook Country, Książnica, Katowice 2008
- Portis, Charles; True Grit, Sonia Draga, Katowice 2011
