= Metro 2039 =

Upcoming video game

- Developer: 4A Games
- Publisher: Deep Silver
- Director: Andriy Shevchenko
- Series: Metro
- Engine: 4A Engine
- Platforms: PlayStation 5; Windows; Xbox Series X/S
- Release: 4 February 2027
- Genre: First-person shooter
- Mode: Single-player

Metro 2039 is an upcoming first-person shooter video game developed by 4A Games and published by Deep Silver. It is set to release for PlayStation 5, Windows and Xbox Series X/S on 4 February 2027. It is a sequel to Metro Exodus (2019).

== Synopsis ==
Set in a post-apocalyptic world following a nuclear war, Metro 2039 continues the setting of previous entries in the Metro series, which are based on the novels by Dmitry Glukhovsky. Set four years after the events of Metro Exodus, it follows a former Metro resident known as the Stranger. Plagued by violent and traumatic nightmares, the Stranger must venture into the post-apocalyptic Moscow Metro, where its factions have united under a single banner called the Novoreich.

== Development ==
Following the release of Metro Exodus in 2019, Metro series author Dmitry Glukhovsky indicated that another Metro game was in development, writing that "The Metro gaming series will be continued" and that he was working on the story. Metro 2039 was developed by Ukrainian studio 4A Games across its Kyiv and Malta offices. In November 2020, 4A Games confirmed that a new single-player Metro title was in active development.

4A's initial plans changed after Russia invaded Ukraine in February 2022. The studio experienced electricity outages as a result of the war, relying on batteries and generators to complete their work. In light of the war in Ukraine, 4A sought to emphasise a Ukrainian perspective with Metro 2039.

=== Narrative ===
Metro 2039's narrative was designed in collaboration with Dmitry Glukhovsky, author of the Metro book series. Glukhovsky said that Metro 2039 is "darker than anything you've seen before" in the Metro series. According to executive producer Jon Bloch, the themes of Metro 2039 are based on the "consequences of war – the cost of silence, the horrors of tyranny, and the price of freedom". 4A Games "wanted to make sure that the morality was clear" in Metro 2039 rather than the moral grayness of previous Metro titles.

=== Level design ===
Level design in Metro 2039 emphasises creating a sense of history in what game director Andriy Shevchenko called "frozen stories". The environment is staged with items and bodies to tell micro-narratives. The return to the Moscow Metro brings back more confined spaces with denser environmental storytelling compared to the larger, outdoor environments featured in Metro Exodus.

=== Technology ===
Metro 2039 was built using 4A Games's in-house proprietary 4A Engine for ninth generation consoles and PC. With Metro Exodus: Enhanced Edition (2021), 4A Games led in real-time ray tracing. It included ray traced global illumination for diffuse lighting and specular reflections on rough surfaces on consoles with additional specular reflections on mirror-like surfaces on PC.

== Release ==
Metro 2039 was first announced on 13 April 2026, followed by an Xbox First Look reveal presentation by Xbox on 16 April. Within two weeks of its reveal, Metro 2039 reached one million wishlists across Steam and other platforms.
