= Metro: Last Light =

2013 video game by 4A Games

- Developer: 4A Games
- Publisher: Deep Silver
- Director: Andrew Prokhorov
- Designer: Viacheslav Aristov
- Programmers: Oles Shyshkovtsov; Alexander Maximchuk
- Artist: Andrey Tkachenko
- Writers: Dmitry Glukhovsky; Andrew Prokhorov; Paul De Meo
- Composer: Alexei Omelchuk
- Series: Metro
- Engine: 4A Engine
- Platforms: Microsoft Windows; PlayStation 3; Xbox 360; OS X; Linux; PlayStation 4; Xbox One; Nintendo Switch; Stadia; PlayStation 5; Xbox Series X/S
- Release: May 14, 2013: Windows, PS3, X360; NA: 14 May 2013; AU: 16 May 2013; EU: 17 May 2013 OS X; WW: 10 September 2013 Linux; WW: 5 November 2013 PlayStation 4, Xbox One; NA: 26 August 2014; EU: 29 August 2014; AU: 4 September 2014 Nintendo Switch; WW: 28 February 2020 Stadia; WW: 23 June 2020 PlayStation 5, Xbox Series X/S; WW: 29 October 2026
- Genre: First-person shooter
- Mode: Single-player

Metro: Last Light is a 2013 first-person shooter video game developed by 4A Games and published by Deep Silver. A sequel to the video game Metro 2033 and the second installment in the Metro series, its story follows Artyom, a young soldier living in the Moscow Metro after a devastating nuclear war. Tasked with finding the mysterious Dark Ones, Artyom must venture to different parts of the metro system, and the surface filled with radiated gases, and fight against different factions and mutated monsters. The game improves on various gameplay mechanics of 2033, and introduces elements such as weapon customization.

Developed by a team of about 80 people, Last Light is a direct sequel to 2033, with franchise creator Dmitry Glukhovsky writing the game's dialogue and main story outline. Multiplayer modes were planned but were eventually scrapped in order to focus on single-player, which the developers hoped would "rekindle memories of Half-Life 2". The game was originally set to be published by THQ, which provided a very limited budget for the game's development, causing the team to work under extremely difficult conditions. Koch Media acquired the rights to the franchise following THQ's bankruptcy. A planned Wii U version was ultimately canceled. The game was released for Microsoft Windows, PlayStation 3 and Xbox 360 in May 2013.

The game received generally positive reviews from critics. Praise was focused largely on its atmosphere, world design, tone, graphics and gameplay, while criticism was directed particularly at the artificial intelligence and technical issues. The pre-order bonus Ranger mode, marketed as the definitive way of playing the game, triggered controversy. The game was a commercial success, with its first-week retail sales in the United States surpassing the lifetime retail sales of 2033. The game's novelization written by Glukhovsky was published as Metro 2035 in 2015. A remastered version titled Metro: Last Light Redux was released in 2014 for Microsoft Windows, PlayStation 4 and Xbox One. The remastered version was also included as part of a compilation titled Metro Redux containing both Metro 2033 Redux and Metro: Last Light Redux. A sequel, Metro Exodus, was released in 2019.

== Gameplay ==
A gameplay screenshot showing Artyom fighting a mutant inside the Metro. 4A Games intentionally took a minimalist approach to designing the head-up display.

Like its predecessor Metro 2033, Metro: Last Light is a post-apocalyptic-themed first-person shooter video game with stealth and survival horror elements. It is played from the perspective of Artyom, the player-character, who is a silent protagonist. The story takes place in post-apocalyptic Moscow, mostly inside the metro system, but occasionally missions bring the player above ground. Combat alternates between the player fighting mutants and hostile humans. Areas are larger in Last Light compared to 2033, and the game encourages exploration by having multiple routes. The game offers more freedom to the player, allowing them to utilize different tactics to combat enemies. It features destructible environments, in which certain objects, such as pillars, collapse after being shot. Numerous diary entries, written by Artyom, providing additional insight regarding the game's story, are scattered throughout environments for the player to collect.

As a first-person shooter, Metro: Last Light features a variety of firearms, some fictional and some based on real weapons, which the player uses in combat. The game's protagonist, Artyom, also has the ability to kill an enemy directly with his melee weapon. Artyom has three weapons slots. The player can put any weapon into these slots without restriction. They also have access to four different secondary weapons, including throwing knives, incendiary grenades, and hand grenades. Mutants do not possess weapons and tend to physically attack the player in swarms, while humans fight with the same firearms available to the player. The player can knock out or kill most human enemies instead of shooting them, using stealth to avoid detection. As enemies are inefficient in spotting the player character in darkness, the player can turn off oil lamps and light bulbs to gain an advantage over their opponents.

In the post-apocalyptic environment, ammunition is a rare and essential commodity. Pre-apocalypse, military-grade ammunition is used as currency. The player can avoid consuming all the valuable currency by using lower quality bullets made within the Metros. Due to the scarcity of ammunition, a crucial aspect of gameplay is scavenging. The player can loot corpses and the environment for spare ammunition, as well as weapons and other items. The military-grade ammunition can be used to purchase other ammunition, weapons, and items within most of the Metro stations. Weapon attachments, such as scopes and silencers, which improve weapon efficiency, can be purchased with these bullets.

The game's locations reflect the dark atmosphere of real metro tunnels, with added survival horror elements. Paranormal phenomena, such as shadow figures, hallucinations, and unexplained noises are present, and, for the most part, the player has to rely on their lighter and rechargeable flashlight to navigate the darkness. Locations' layouts are often intricate, and the game lacks any form of map or objective marker, leaving the player to try finding their objectives with only a compass. The surface is more lethal than the Metro system. Featuring a day-night cycle, and a dynamic weather system, the surface sections are severely irradiated and a gas mask must be worn at all times because of the toxic air. As such, the player must collect air filters for the gas mask. These last several minutes each, and can be replaced provided the player has more in reserve. Players also need to wipe off the dirt and blood spatter that collects on the gas mask. There is no heads-up display indicator to tell how long the player has until the gas mask's filters begin to fail — rather, a timer on the character's wristwatch shows how long until the current filter expires. The watch also features a light level indicator to tell a player if they have been exposed to enemy attention. With every weapon, the bullets are (partly) visible, informing the player that their weapon is about to run out of ammunition and they have to reload. Instead of head up display, the game makes use of audio and visual cues to present information to the player.

There are certain subtle moral choices in the game that provide karma. Good karma can be acquired by positive actions, such as rescuing people from enemy characters, listening to conversations between NPCs, or sparing enemy soldiers. Bad karma can be acquired from negative actions, such as unnecessary killing or stealing things. Karma affects the ending that the player experiences.

== Plot ==
Metro: Last Light takes place in 2034, one year after the events of Metro 2033, following the ending of the original novel in which Artyom's missile strike against the Dark Ones — mysterious beings that seemingly threatened the survivors of a nuclear war living in the Moscow Metro — occurred. The Rangers, a neutral peacekeeping force that operates throughout the system, have since occupied the D6 military facility Artyom visited during the first game. This is a huge, and not fully explored pre-war bunker, and Artyom, now a Ranger himself, remains unsure whether killing the Dark Ones was the correct decision. Rumors of D6's discovery and its great riches have spread around the Metro; rival factions, such as the Soviet Red Line and Nazi Fourth Reich, hope to seize the bunker and its contents.

Khan, a wandering mystic, informs Artyom and the Rangers that a single Dark One survived the missile strike. Khan believes that it is the key to humanity's future, and wants to communicate with it; Colonel Miller, the Ranger's leader, wants to eliminate it as a potential threat. Miller sends Artyom to the surface, accompanied by Miller's daughter Anna, the Rangers' best sniper, to kill the Dark One.

Artyom finds the Dark One, a child, but is captured by soldiers of the Fourth Reich. Pavel Morozov, a captured Red Line soldier, and Artyom escape through the Metro tunnels and across the devastated surface. When they reach the Red Line, however, Pavel is revealed to be a high-ranking officer, and detains Artyom to learn more about the Rangers and the Dark One. Artyom escapes and races through Pavel's forces to locate the Dark One and Anna, who has been kidnapped by Lesnitsky, a Red Line spy who was revealed to have been undercover for the Rangers. En route, he finds a contingent of Red Line forces massacring the inhabitants of a station, supposedly to contain a mysterious epidemic. It was the Red Line that introduced the virus to the station – weaponized Ebola acquired from the D6 vault by Lesnitsky. Artyom finds Anna and frees her but they are exposed to the virus and are quarantined after the rescue. Afraid that they will die, Anna and Artyom make love.

After they test negative for the virus, Artyom again encounters Khan. They locate the young Dark One, and in a series of hallucinatory flashbacks, Artyom recalls that he was saved by a Dark One as a child; he was psychically linked to the Dark Ones, intended to form a bridge between their species and his. Artyom vows to make amends by protecting the little Dark One, and the two travel to Polis, the Metro's central area, where a peace conference regarding D6 between the Rangers, Red Line, the Reich, and neutral Hansa is taking place. Artyom defeats Lesnitsky and Pavel during the trip. Along the way, the little Dark One senses that there is a group of hibernating Dark Ones in D6. After arriving at Polis, the little Dark One uses his telepathic abilities to make the Red Line leader, Chairman Moskvin, publicly confess that the peace conference is a diversion to enable General Korbut to seize D6. Artyom and the rest of the Rangers rush to the bunker to make a final stand against Korbut's army but are incapacitated by an armored train ramming into their station. Red Line soldiers surround and prepare to execute Artyom and Miller.

The karma the player has acquired determines the ending. In the "bad" ending, Artyom destroys D6 to prevent Korbut from using the facility to wipe out the remnants of the other factions and possibly humanity, resulting in the deaths of himself, the surviving Rangers, and the Red Line forces. Later, Anna is shown telling their son of Artyom's bravery. In the "good" ending, later revealed as the canonical ending, Artyom prepares to destroy the bunker but is stopped by the little Dark One, who, along with the awakened Dark Ones, defeats Korbut's army by having them kill each other through hallucinations. Artyom calls the little Dark One humanity's "last light of hope". In both endings, the young Dark One leaves with the surviving Dark Ones to find safety, while promising that they will come back in the future to help rebuild the world.

== Development ==
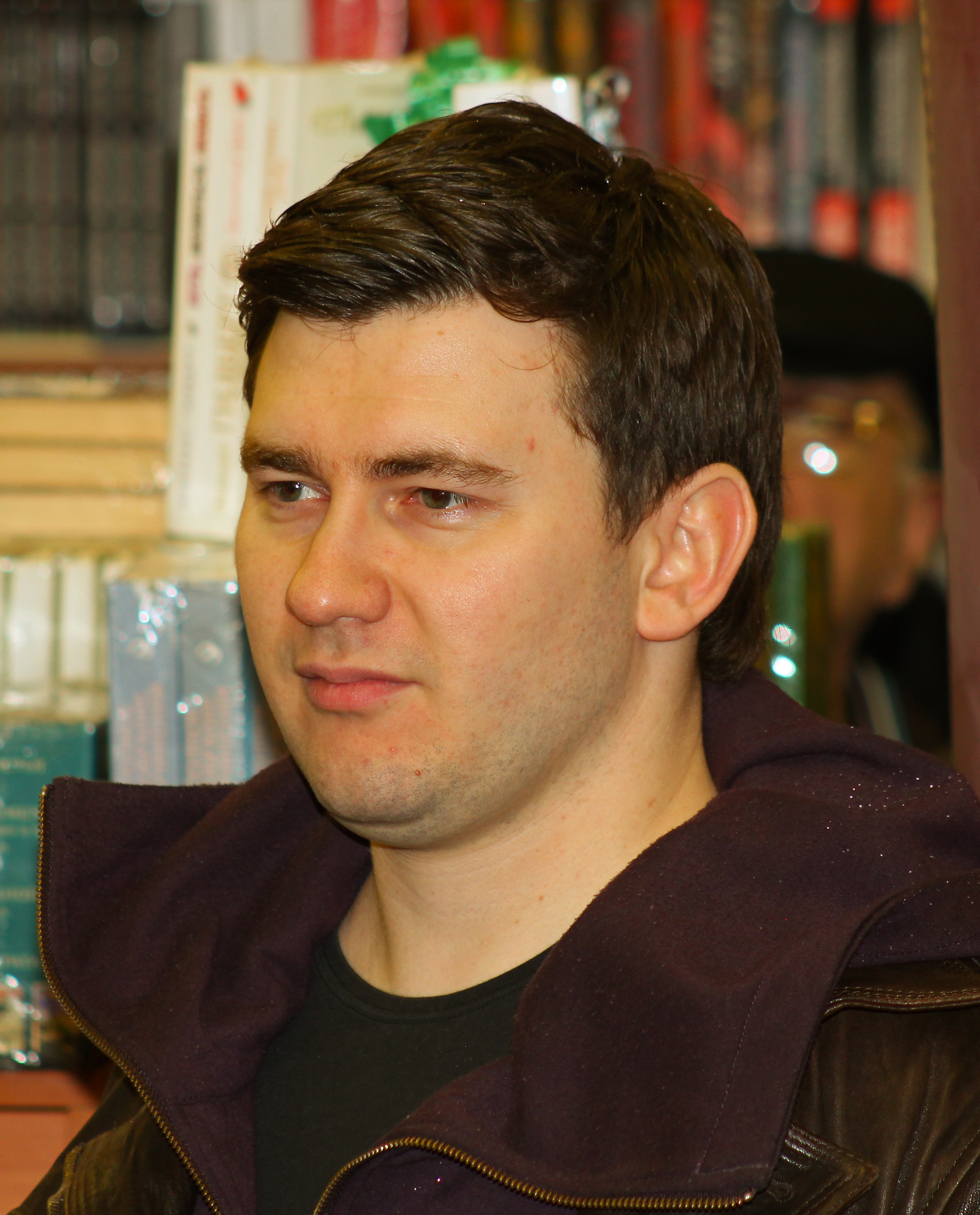
Dmitry Glukhovsky, the author of the original Metro 2033 book, helped write Last Light.

The Ukraine-based lead developer 4A Games made the game with a team of more than 80 people. A sequel to Metro 2033 written by Russian author Dmitry Glukhovsky, Last Light, is not related to his next book Metro 2034. Instead, it serves as a direct sequel to the first game, with the majority of the ideas created by 4A Games. According to Huw Beynon, head of communications for of THQ, the team chose not to make a video game adaptation of 2034 as they thought 2034's tone was drastically different from its predecessor. He described it as an "art-house thriller", and believed that, unlike the first game, it could not be converted successfully into a video game. However, Glukhovsky offered creative input to the project and wrote a brief outline of the game's story, as well as the game's dialogue, which used 3,000 spreadsheet cells in Excel. The team chose the bad ending of 2033, as they believed that it offered an interesting beginning for Last Light, and is consistent with the novel's dark and depressing tone. Glukhovsky claimed that the story would explore the theme of redemption, people repeating their mistakes, and the idea of having a "second chance". The Artyom character also shifted to become more mature and experienced. However, he remained a silent character as the team thought that having him speak would not contribute to his character development and would interfere with the atmosphere and morality system.

One of the key goals of 4A Games was to improve and refine numerous aspects of 2033, which THQ described as a "flawed masterpiece". The strong focus on atmosphere was retained, but the team overhauled numerous gameplay mechanics. The game's shooting mechanics were improved, and the firearms featured in the game were no longer underpowered. The animation system was reworked and more visual effects were added. The game's artificial intelligence was also refined to become more responsive to the player's actions. After hearing feedback about 2033's bullet-based economic system, the team decided to keep the feature in Last Light but improve the explanation about how it worked so that the player would not be confused by it. In addition, the team revealed that they would not westernize the franchise to attract a larger audience. Instead, they would overhaul the game's controls to make it more accessible. The team also drastically improved the game's stealth sections. The core philosophy in designing these sections was "fun"; the player would not be punished too harshly if they made any mistakes. As a result, the alertness of the artificial intelligence features several different levels, making the game more realistic. A competitive multiplayer mode was originally planned that was said to be unique to the Metro series, and would not simply include typical multiplayer modes such as team deathmatch and capture the flag. However, it was eventually cancelled.

Another of the team's goals was to make the player feel unsettled after playing the game, and present gameplay moments that would make them worry and feel vulnerable. The team incorporated survival horror elements into the game, which were also used in the first game. The game was described by THQ as their own "bid to combat shooter fatigue" using its heavy single-player story focus. According to Beynon the game's philosophy is the complete opposite of the Call of Duty franchise, which was described as short, linear, and filled with "filler content" that would only be a tutorial for the multiplayer content. The team hoped to have most moments featured in the game "narrative-driven", and that all the enemy encounters in the game are designed to be different from each other. They hoped that by offering a unique experience with each encounter, they would be remembered by the player. They hoped that the game would "rekindle memories of Half-Life 2".

The world is created to be believable. Glukhovsky included numerous side stories in the game, and different kinds of dramas surrounding the game's four factions. He hoped that through this approach, the game would have more depth than typical first-person shooters, and make the game feel genuinely realistic. Moral choices return in the game. According to 4A, these choices are very subtle, so that they would not "gamify" the concept. It is a method carried out by 4A to create a sense of verisimilitude to the world, which will then make the decision more "genuine". Also, Andrey Prokhorov, the game's creative director, intentionally removed most aspects of a typical head up display as they considered it a barrier preventing the player from immersing themselves into the world, and that having it would destroy the game's atmosphere. Prokhorov noted that adding numerous graphical and audio cues required additional time and effort, but added that the time may remove the HUD altogether if they have sufficient time.

Last Light is powered by 4A Games' own in-house engine, 4A Engine. The team also worked to improve the game's lighting and destruction system and introduced a larger variety of color palette. The game was originally set to be released for Nintendo's Wii U, and the title was included in the Wii U show-reel, though THQ later stated that the game might not be released for that platform. Regarding the possibility of the game coming to the Wii U, 4A Games chief technical officer Oles Shishkovtsov said the Wii U had a "horrible, slow CPU". Beynon, reiterated the sentiment, saying that there would not be a Wii U version of the game, because the studio "couldn't justify the effort required" and they "just figured it wasn't worth pursuing at this time". 4A experimented with the Wii U development kit, but later gave up this version of the game during its early stages of development.

THQ was the publisher of the first game, but the studio put little effort into helping the game's development, leading to numerous technical issues and a lack of polish. However, the game's sales surprised THQ, and as a result, the publisher considered the first game a missed opportunity, and began to treat Metro as a franchise. Danny Bilson, then CEO of THQ, promised that the company would offer 4A more support and dedicate more resources in both the game's actual development and its marketing. Former THQ President Jason Rubin offered details of extremely difficult working conditions and demands put on the 4A Games team while completing the game. Their office was freezing due to frequent power failures, and the team was forced to smuggle computer equipment into the offices to avoid corrupt customs officials. Rubin added that the publisher offered an unreasonably small budget to the development team, accounting for only 10% of its competitor's budget and that their workspace was so crowded and small that he compared it to "a packed grade school cafeteria", and an "[underutilized] gym at EA Los Angeles". Rubin praised the team for producing a game that successfully achieved high critical praise in spite of the harsh working conditions. According to Andrew Prokhorov, Rubin was the only THQ president to visit the studio. He noted that the team "deserve the ratings [they] get" and "need no indulgence" from consumers who did not care about their working conditions.

== Release ==
Last Light's title was first leaked as Metro 2034, a name used by 4A Games internally. THQ officially revealed the actual title in May 2011. In November 2012, THQ announced that it had delayed the game's release until March 2013 in order to give the development team more time to polish the game further. In December 2012, the game's original publisher, THQ, entered Chapter 11 bankruptcy. Metro: Last Light, along with other THQ properties and studios, went to auction on 22 January 2013. GameStop temporarily removed the game from its store to prevent customers from being misled by the game's uncertain release. The auction did not affect the progress of the game's development significantly. Clearlake and Koch Media, the latter of which was originally set to distribute the title in Italy and Spain, participated in the auction. Koch Media eventually acquired the rights to the Metro franchise for $5.9 million. Koch was interested in the title as the game was already playable at the time and they were familiar with the development team, whose members worked on S.T.A.L.K.E.R.: Clear Sky, a game published by Koch Media's label Deep Silver.

After the auction, Deep Silver announced that the title would be released on 14 May 2013 in North America, 16 May 2013 in Australia and New Zealand, and 17 May 2013 in Europe for Microsoft Windows, PlayStation 3, and Xbox 360. It was released for OS X on 10 September 2013, Linux on 5 November 2013, and the title was bundled with Valve's prototype of Steam Machine. The PlayStation 3 version of the game was available for free for PlayStation Plus subscribers for one month in February 2014.

Players who purchased the game via Steam got a free digital copy of the novel Metro 2033. A digital graphic novel titled The Gospel According to Artyom, which tells the events that take place between 2033 and Last Light, was published by Dark Horse Comics and was a pre-order exclusive. A novelization of the game, written by Glukhovsky, was published as Metro 2035 in 2015.

In Japan, the game was published and localized by Spike Chunsoft.

=== Downloadable content ===
Those who pre-ordered the game received a limited edition of Metro: Last Light that featured a code for the downloadable content (DLC) Ranger Mode, a setting for greater game difficulty, as well as a unique gun and in-game currency. Ranger Mode encompasses the same campaign, but with the lack of a HUD or cross hairs, while the plethora of ammunition and resources has been reduced severely, making the player feel fully immersed in the game's world. It was marketed as "the way [the game] was meant to be played". The game's implementation of Ranger Mode caused negative reactions in the gaming community. Deep Silver responded by saying that they were required by retailers to provide pre-order exclusive game content, and that Ranger Mode was the best choice as only the most loyal fans would likely pre-order the game.

Additionally, four DLC packs were released. The first pack, the Faction Pack, was to be available in June 2013. However, the release date was pushed back to July 2013. This pack contains three bonus single-player missions, with the player playing as a Red Line Sniper, a Fourth Reich "Heavy" soldier, and a Polis Ranger in training, with new weapons not found in the main storyline. The other three packs were released within 60 days of releasing the Faction Pack. The second pack, the Tower Pack, gives single-player challenge missions that have online leaderboards. The third pack, the Developer Pack, features a shooting gallery, a combat simulator, an in-game museum, and a single-player mission titled "The Spiders' Nest". Finally, the fourth pack, the Chronicles Pack, features three additional single-player missions that contain three characters from the main storyline, Khan, Pavel and Anna, adding in extra background story information about the world. Players can buy a season pass, which gives them all four DLCs at a discounted price. It also contains a limited edition, in-game automatic shotgun called the Abzats, and a light machine gun that was previously only available via pre-order from select retailers, the RPK.

=== Last Light Redux ===
A new version of the game for the eighth generation consoles was not originally planned. However, on 22 May 2014, a remastered version of the game titled Metro: Last Light Redux was announced. It was released on 26 August 2014 in North America, 29 August 2014 in Europe, and 4 September 2014 in Australia for Microsoft Windows, PlayStation 4, and Xbox One. Last Light Redux adds all the DLC and graphical improvements. A compilation titled Metro Redux that included both the remastered versions of 2033 and Last Light was also released. A demo of the Redux version, which allows players to play through the first third of the game, was released for the PlayStation 4 and Xbox One on 2 June 2015. Last Light Redux was released as a DRM-free game on GOG.com in May 2015. It was also released on the Nintendo Switch on 28 February 2020 and on Stadia on 23 June 2020. A free "Next-Gen Update" for the PC version was released on 22 October 2026, while versions for PlayStation 5 and Xbox Series X/S were released on 29 October as a free upgrade for PlayStation 4 and Xbox One owners, respectively.

== Reception ==
=== Critical reception ===
Reception

Aggregate score
Aggregator	Score
Metacritic	PC: 82/100; PS3: 80/100; X360: 80/100; PC (Redux): 76/100; NS: 86/100

Review scores
Publication	Score
Destructoid	7/10
Eurogamer	7/10
Famitsu	35/40
Game Informer	8.75/10
GameRevolution	4/5
GameSpot	9/10
Giant Bomb	4/5
IGN	PC: 7.7/10; PS3/X360: 7.2/10
Joystiq	4.5/5
PC Gamer (UK)	80/100
Polygon	8.5/10

Metro: Last Light received positive reviews from critics, with most complimenting the graphics and world design, but criticizing the linear sequences. The game was nominated for Best Shooter for Spike's 2013 VGX game awards, and Xbox 360 Game of the Year by GameSpot.

The gameplay was generally well received. Critics praised 4A Games for fixing the apparent gameplay missteps featured in its predecessors, and noted that the combat was improved, satisfying and riveting. Jeff Marchiafava noted that the gameplay was on par with its competitors. However, some noted that the game lacked innovation and was generally too conservative. Many applauded the game for allowing both stealth and a more aggressive approach towards missions, and that stealth and gunplay were described as tense and challenging, respectively. The game's more accessible nature received mixed reviews. Some thought that it removed the frustration featured in the first game, while some criticized it for being too simple. Rich Stanton in particular criticized the game for compromising in order to attract a wider audience, though Patrick Klepek from Giant Bomb thought that the charm of the first game remained undiminished in Last Light. Many critics considered stealth the definitive way to play the game as it matches the overall tone. The bullet economy system was praised for being "unique". Some journalists also noted several technical problems with the game, singling out the Windows version, and many criticized the artificial intelligence for being unrefined. The boss battles were also criticized for being frustrating. The monster characters attracted criticism for not being threatening in terms of their appearance, and too difficult to defeat, with Rich Stanton from Eurogamer describing them as creatures from "a poor man's Doom". Some critics criticized the presence of invisible walls and inaccessible paths, which led to frustration and annoyance. The game's audio was also praised for being coherent with its graphics, gameplay, and atmosphere.

The story received mixed critical reviews. Some critics believed that the story was excellently-written, with interesting characters, and meaningful character interactions, which added additional depth to the game's world. According to Phillip Kollar from Polygon, the game successfully allowed the player to have "real sympathy" towards its characters, but Artyom was described as an "empty shell" by PC Gamer's Marsh Davies. Some felt that the story was intricate, compelling, engaging, and interesting, with some genuinely touching moments, while others criticized it for being predictable and uneven. The ambient dialogue was described as the game's "best stories" by Stanton, though he noted that they are easily missed. The voice-acting received mixed reviews. Some critics called it "top-notch", while some called it "bad".

The surface area featured in the game received praise for being atmospheric and delivering a sense of desperation.

The game's world design and atmosphere received great critical reviews. Many critics agreed that the game had successfully built up tension through the game's conversations between characters and the resource management mechanics, which enabled the player to feel threatened by the state of the world. The world was thought to be more "alive" than its predecessor, and critics praised the development team for creating distinct locations, and turning typical gritty colors featured in many games into something refreshing and stunning. The depiction of the world and 4A's vision of an apocalypse was applauded for delivering a sense of sadness and desperation. The game's attention to detail was widely praised, and the surface area, in particular, was applauded. Critics thought that these sequences offered visual variety, and some "genuine terror" moments. James Stephanie Sterling from Destructoid singled out the game's multiple flashback scenes, which he described as "harrowing".

The Redux version received positive reviews from critics. They praised the game's overall atmosphere and gameplay, but criticized the graphical update, which was considered insignificant. According to Mikel Reparaz, the game's visual update was disappointing as it did not look better than the original PC version. Nevertheless, it was described as the "definitive version" of Last Light to play because of the inclusion of all of the previously released downloadable content.

=== Sales ===
Metro: Last Light was the best-selling retail video game in the UK in its week of release, but it failed to outpace the week one sales of 2033. The first-week retail sales of the game in the United States surpassed the lifetime retail sales of 2033. It was the sixth best-selling retail game in the U.S. in its month of release according to NPD Group. While the exact sales of the game have not been revealed, Deep Silver announced that the Metro Redux collection sold more than 1.5 million copies.

== Sequel ==
Metro Exodus is a direct sequel to the good ending of Last Light. The game was released for Windows, Xbox One and PlayStation 4 on 15 February 2019 with other platforms following afterwards.
