= Metro (franchise) =

Novel and video game franchise

- Logo used in video games since Last Light
- Created by: Dmitry Glukhovsky
- Original work: Metro 2033 (2002)
- Owner: Dmitry Glukhovsky

Print publications
- Novels: Metro 2033 (2002); Metro 2034 (2009); Metro 2035 (2015); Other
- Comics: Metro 2033: Britannia; The Gospel According to Artyom
- Graphic novel: Metro 2033: Britannia Comic Prologue

Games
- Traditional: Metro 2033 (2011)
- Video game(s): Metro 2033 (2010); Metro: Last Light (2013); Metro Exodus (2019); Metro Awakening (2024); Metro 2039 (2027)

Metro (Russian: Метро) is a post-apocalyptic fiction franchise consisting primarily of novels and video games based on novel Metro 2033 (2002) by Russian writer Dmitry Glukhovsky. It was followed by his sequels Metro 2034 (2009) and Metro 2035 (2015), as well as books by different authors, including Tullio Avoledo, Pierre Bordage, Robert J. Szmidt and Shimun Vrochek.

THQ published video game adaptation, Metro 2033, developed by 4A Games, based of the original novel in 2010. This became a series of 4A Games titles published by Deep Silver, Metro: Last Light (2013), Metro Exodus (2019) and Metro Awakening (2024).

All of the Metro stories share the same setting – the fictional universe of Glukhovsky's novels. Although these described only his own vision of a devastated Moscow, and in particular the titular Moscow Metro system, the works of the extended universe take place in a wide variety of different areas within Russia and elsewhere in a world ravaged by global biological and nuclear warfare.

== Metro 2033 novel ==
Most of the written works of the series were originally released in Russia. Some books from the universe of Metro 2033, like Piter, Towards the Light and Into the Darkness, have been translated to a number of European languages, such as German, Polish and Swedish. Prior to 2014 and the video games Metro 2033 and Metro: Last Light, no books in the series were released in a country where English is the prominent language.

== Video games ==
Release timeline
2010	Metro 2033
2011
2012
2013	Metro: Last Light
2014
2015
2016	Metro 2033: Wars
2017
2018
2019	Metro Exodus
2020
2021
2022
2023
2024	Metro Awakening
2025
2026
2027	Metro 2039

A first-person shooter video game titled Metro 2033 was created for Microsoft Windows and Xbox 360 gaming platforms. It was developed by Ukrainian company 4A Games and published in March 2010 by THQ. A sequel, Metro: Last Light, was released in May 2013 on Microsoft Windows, Xbox 360 and PlayStation 3. Redux versions of the games were released in 2014, featuring updated graphics and gameplay with all previously released downloadable content bundled. The Metro Redux bundle was released for the PC, Xbox One and PlayStation 4. A third game, Metro Exodus, was released in February 2019. A virtual reality spin-off game, Metro Awakening, was released in November 2024. A fourth mainline entry, Metro 2039, is currently in development. As of October 2026, the franchise has sold 50 million copies.

Game	Details
Metro 2033: NA: 16 March 2010; AU: 18 March 2010; EU: 19 March 2010; – Xbox 360, Microsoft Windows, OS X (2014), Linux (2015)	Notes: A first-person video game.; First game in the series, developed by 4A Games and published by THQ.; Utilized 4A Engine
Metro: Last Light: NA: 14 May 2013; AU: 16 May 2013; EU: 17 May 2013; – Xbox 360, PlayStation 3, Microsoft Windows, OS X, Linux	Notes: A sequel to Metro 2033; Published by Deep Silver after THQ's bankruptcy; Original story, independent of the narrative in the book series
Metro Redux: NA: 26 August 2014; AU: 4 September 2014; EU: 29 August 2014; – Microsoft Windows, PlayStation 4, PlayStation 5, Xbox One, Nintendo Switch (2020), Stadia	Notes: Remastered version of both Metro 2033 and Metro: Last Light
Metro 2033: Wars: iOS: 28 December 2015; Windows Phone: 29 April 2015; – iOS, Windows Phone	Notes: Developed by DaSuppa and published by TapStar Interactive.
Metro Exodus 15 February 2019 – Microsoft Windows, OS X, PlayStation 4, PlayStation 5, Xbox One, Xbox Series S/X, Stadia	Notes: Sequel to Metro: Last Light
Metro Awakening 7 November 2024 – Microsoft Windows, PlayStation 5, Android	Notes: Developed by Vertigo Games; A virtual reality-only title for PlayStation VR2, Meta Quest, and Steam VR
Metro 2039 4 February 2027 – Microsoft Windows, PlayStation 5, Xbox Series S/X	Notes: Developed by 4A Games

== Other novels ==
The Universe of Metro 2033 (Russian: Вселенная Метро 2033) is a series of short stories, novellas, and novels, spanning a variety of genres ranging from post-apocalyptic action to romance, written by several different authors. Despite being written by various authors, the stories of the extended Metro series are all supported by Dmitry Glukhovsky and advertised on the official Metro website.

Author	Title	Locations	Date of publication
Vladimir Berezin	Road Signs	Moscow, Saint Petersburg, Leningrad Oblast, Tver Oblast, Moscow Oblast	December 2009
Sergey Antonov	Dark Tunnels	Moscow	January 2010
Shimun Vrochek	Piter	Saint Petersburg, Leningrad Oblast	February 2010
Sergey Kuznetsov	Marmoreal Paradise	Moscow Oblast, Moscow	May 2010
Andrey Dyakov	Towards the Light	Saint Petersburg, Leningrad Oblast	June 2010
Andrey Erpylev	The Yield by Force	Moscow	July 2010
Suren Tsormudian	The Wanderer	Moscow	September 2010
Andrey Butorin	The North	Kola Peninsula, Murmansk	October 2010
Sergey Antonov	In the Interest of the Revolution	Moscow	November 2010
Alexandr Shakilov	War of the Moles	Kyiv	December 2010
Ruslan Melnikov	Murancha	Rostov on Don	January 2011
Sergey Paliy	The Nameless	Samara	February 2011
Sergey Moskvin	To See the Sun	Novosibirsk	March 2011
Andrey Grebenschikov	Below Hell	Yekaterinburg	April 2011
Anna Kalinkina	Ghost-Station	Moscow	June 2011
Andrey Dyakov	Into the Darkness	Leningrad Oblast, Saint Petersburg	June 2011
Sergey Zaytsev	Corpsmen	Moscow	August 2011
Grant McMaster	Britannia	Glasgow, Scotland, England, Carlisle, York, Conisbrough, Doncaster, Sheffield, Chesterfield, Leicester, London	September 2011
Igor Vardunas	Ice Prison	Baltic Sea, La Manche, Atlantic Ocean, Africa, Antarctica	October 2011
Andrey Butorin	Siege of Paradise	Kola Peninsula, Polyarnye Zori	November 2011
Twenty two Russian authors (edited by Dmitry Glukhovsky)	The Last Refuge (short story collection)	Moscow, Saint Petersburg, Moscow Oblast, Novosibirsk, Yekaterinburg, Nizhny Novgorod, Krasnodar, Biisk, Sochi	December 2011
Sergey Antonov	Unburied	Moscow	January 2012
Andrey Chernetsov, Valentin Lezhenda	Blinding Emptiness	Moscow, Kharkiv	January 2012
Tullio Avoledo	The Roots of Heaven	Rome, Lazio, Torrita Tiberina, Umbria, Marche, Urbino, Emilia Romagna, Rimini, Santarcangelo di Romagna, Ravenna, Veneto, Venice	March 2012
Anna Kalinkina	Kingdom of Rats	Moscow	March 2012
Zahar Petrov	MRLs	Minsk	May 2012
Suren Tsormudyan	Ancestral Heritage	Kaliningrad	July 2012
Denis Shabalov	The Right to Use Force	Serdobsk	August 2012
"Timofey Kalashnikov" (collective authorship)	The World's End (short story collection)	Moscow	September 2012
Sergey Moskvin	Hunger	Novaya Zemlya	October 2012
Irina Baranova, Constantine Benev	The Witness	Saint Petersburg	November 2012
Andrey Butorin	The Daughter of Heavenly Spirit	Kola Peninsula, Murmansk	December 2012
Andrey Dyakov	Over the Horizon	Saint-Petersburg, Leningrad, Vologda, Cherepovets, Yaroslavl Oblast, Rybinsk, Yaroslavl, Ivanovo Oblast, Tatarstan, Kazan, Bashkortostan, Beloretsk, Yamantau, Orenburg Oblast, Dagestan, Kaspiysk, Primorsky Krai, Vladivostok	January 2013
Denis Shabolov	The Right to Life	Serdobsk, Penza Oblast, Mordovia, Tatarstan, Mari El, Komi Republic, Kirov Oblast	March 2013
Sergei Antonov	Rublyovka		June 2013
Olga Shvetsova	The One Standing at the Door		July 2013
Ruslan Melnikov	From the Depths		September 2013
Nikita Averin	Crimea		October 2013
Dmitri Yermakov	Blindmen		November 2013
Tagir Kireev	White Leopard		January 2014
Fourteen Polish authors	In the Firelight (short story collection)	Moscow, Łódź	January 2014
Igor Osipov	The Meter		February 2014
Andrei Grebenshchikov	Sisters of Sorrow		March 2014
Tullio Avoledo	The Children's Crusade	Milan	March 2014
Andrey Butorin	Mutant		April 2014
Dmitry Manasypov	The Road of Steel and Hope		May 2014
Anna Kalinkina	The Host of the Yauza		June 2014
Victor Lebedev	Born to Crawl		July 2014
Sergei Antonov	Rublyovka-2		August 2014
Paweł Majka	The Promised District	Nowa Huta, Kraków, Poland	August 2014
Nikita Averin	Crimea-2		September 2014
Elona Demidova, Evgeny Shikil	The Apostate		October 2014
Olga Shvetsova	Nobody		December 2014
Kira Ilarionova	Beast Code		January 2015
Eight Polish authors	Whispers of the Fallen	Kyiv, Moscow, Warsaw, Zwonowice, Radom, Szczecin, Częstochowa, Slovakia, Hungary	April 2015
Nikita Averin	Crimea-3		July 2015
Robert J. Szmidt	The Abyss	Wrocław	August 2015
Igor Osipov	Leshy Never Die	Smolensk	September 2015
Victor Lebedev	Flying Away		October 2015
Sergey Semyonov	Through Alien Eyes	Nizhny Novgorod	December 2015
Dmitry Manasypov	Towards the Distant Blue Sea		February 2016
Rinat Tashtabanov	Countdown		March 2016
Fourteen Polish authors	Echo of an Extinguished World (short story collection)	Warsaw, Zabrze, Kraków, Giewont, Moscow, Stockholm, Dunmore Cave, Gdańsk Bay, Gdynia, Project Riese	March 2016
Robert J. Szmidt	The Tower	Wrocław	May 2016
Yuri Ulengov	Edge of Humanity		June 2016
Maria Strelova	Isolation		July 2016
Paweł Majka	The Promised Man	Kraków	November 2016
Olga Shvetsova	Guardian Demon		February 2017
Artur Chmielewski	Achromatopsia	Warsaw	March 2017
Yuri Kharitonov	At the Edge of the Abyss		May 2017
Denis Shabalov	The Right to Revenge	Serdobsk, Penza	June 2017
Twelve Polish authors	In the Ruins (short story collection)	Oleśnica, Katowice, Szczecin, Sława, Ostrołęka, Żar mountain, Warsaw, Chicago	June 2017
Pavel Makarov	Crossroads of Fate		July 2017
Sergei Antonov	Rublyovka-3		August 2017
Sergey Moskvin	Pythia		October 2017
Suren Tsormudian	The Edge of the Earth		January 2018
Shimun Vrochek	Piter. War.		February 2018
Sergei Nedorub	The Red Option		March 2018
Dmitry Manasypov	Beyond the Ice Clouds		April 2018
Suren Tsormudian	The Edge of the Earth 2: Fire and Ashes		April 2018
Rinat Tashtabanov	Raising the Dead		May 2018
Dmitry Manasypov	Bad Dog		June 2018
Sergey Moskvin	Pythia-2		June 2018
Olga Shvetsova, Shamil Altamirov	Pandora's Box		July 2018
Igor Osipov, Olga Shvetsova	Running Along the Edge		August 2018
Yuri Kharitonov	Shelter of Forgotten Souls		September 2018
Dmitry Manasypov, Shamil Altamirov	Steel Island		October 2018
Svetlana Kuznetsova	Ouroboros		November 2018
Irina Baranova, Konstantin Benev	Queen of the Night		November 2018
Zakhar Petrov	Muos: Purgatory		December 2018
Vladislav Vystavnoy	The Roof of the World		January 2019
Oleg Grach	Parad-alle		January 2019
Victor Lebedev	Blackwater		February 2019
Andrei Lisieva	The Winter of Mercy		March 2019
Tullio Avoledo	The Conclave of Darkness		March 2019
Zakhar Petrov	Muos: The Fall		April 2019
Yuri Mori	Embryo: The Beginning		May 2019
Robert J. Szmidt	The Giant		May 2019
Dmitry Manasypov	Loyal Dog		June 2019
Irina Baranova, Konstantin Benev	City of Seven Winds		July 2019
Sergey Alexeyev	Nomad		July 2019
Vladislav Vystavnoy	The Roof of the World: Carthage		August 2019
Yuri Mori	Embryo: The Duel		October 2019
Shimun Vrochek	Piter. Battle of the Twins		December 2019
Yuri Mori	Embryo: The Fusion		January 2020
Victor Tochinov	Kovacs' Defense		February 2020
Dmitry Blinov	Arkaim		February 2020
Sergei Nedorub	The Lost Clan		April 2020
Pierre Bordage	Left Bank	Paris	May 2020
Svetlana Kuznetsova	A Palace for Slaves		June 2020
Yuri Kharitonov	Death of the Octane Gods		September 2020
Irina Bakulina, Igor Vardunas	The Cage		November 2020
Sergey Antonov	The Supreme Power		November 2020
Sergey Semyonov	The Price of Freedom		January 2021
Pierre Bordage	Right Bank	Paris	March 2021
Pierre Bordage	City	Paris	April 2022
Dmitry Glukhovsky	The Outpost: America		March 2016

== Other media ==
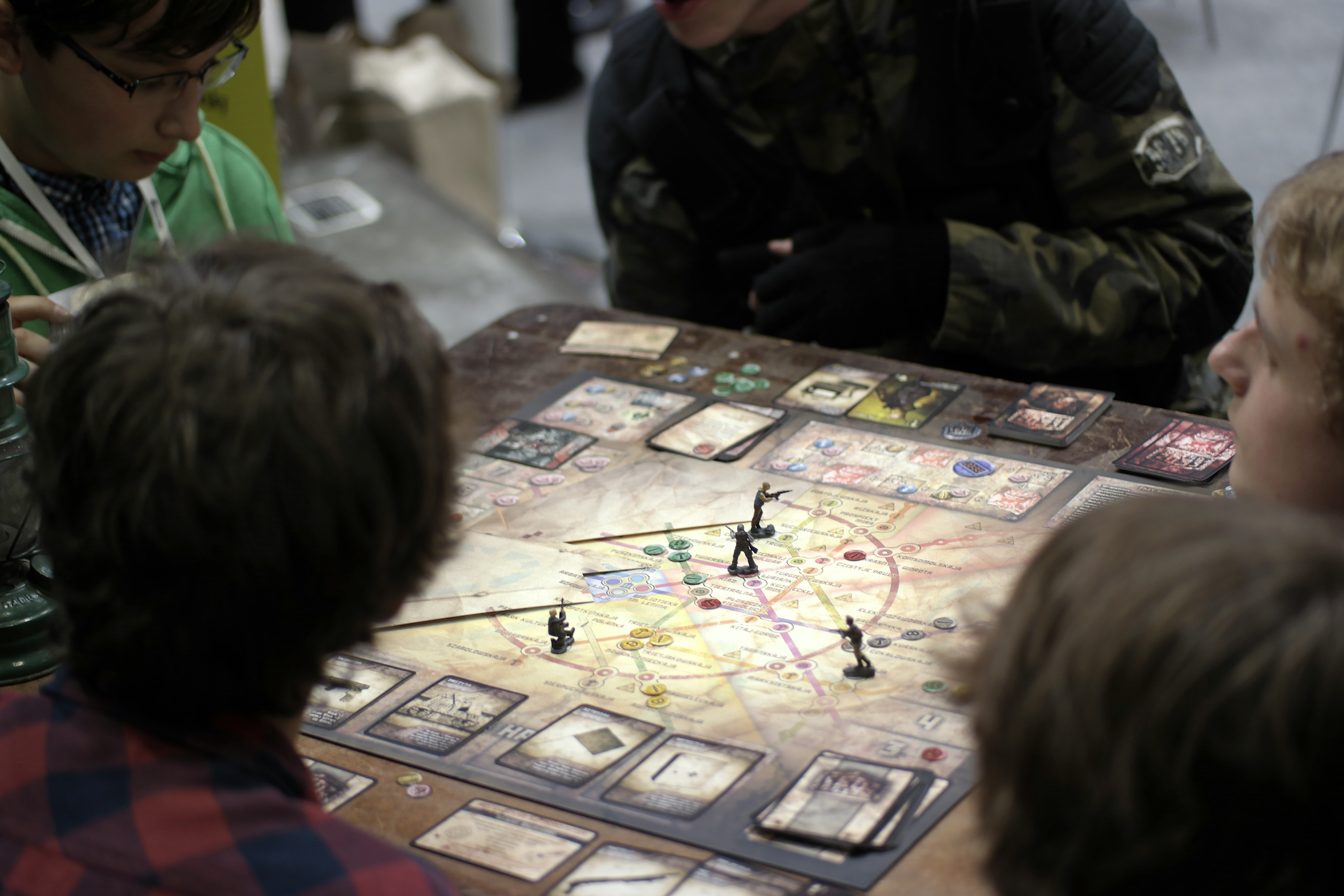
Pyrkon 2015 attendees playing the board game Metro 2033

A graphic novel titled Metro 2033: Britannia Comic Prologue inspired by the prologue of the Metro 2033 novel Britannia was published in 2012. The story was written by Grant McMaster, the author of the novel and is illustrated by Benedict Hollis. It is available as a free download and unlike the novels it is in English rather than Russian.

A Metro 2033 board game based on the original novel was released in 2011. It was designed by Sergei Golubkin and was published by Hobby World.

The Metro series was also being developed into films by Michael De Luca and Solipsist Films for MGM, but the deal has been cancelled by Glukhovsky due to his disapproval to their Americanization of his work. A Russian Metro 2033 film adaptation project was announced by the Russian state company Gazprom Media in 2019. The film is now unlikely to be made since Glukhovsky left the country to avoid prosecution and prison for his criticism of the Russian war in Ukraine.
