= Dmitry Glukhovsky =

Russian author (born 1979)

- Дмитрий Алексеевич Глуховский
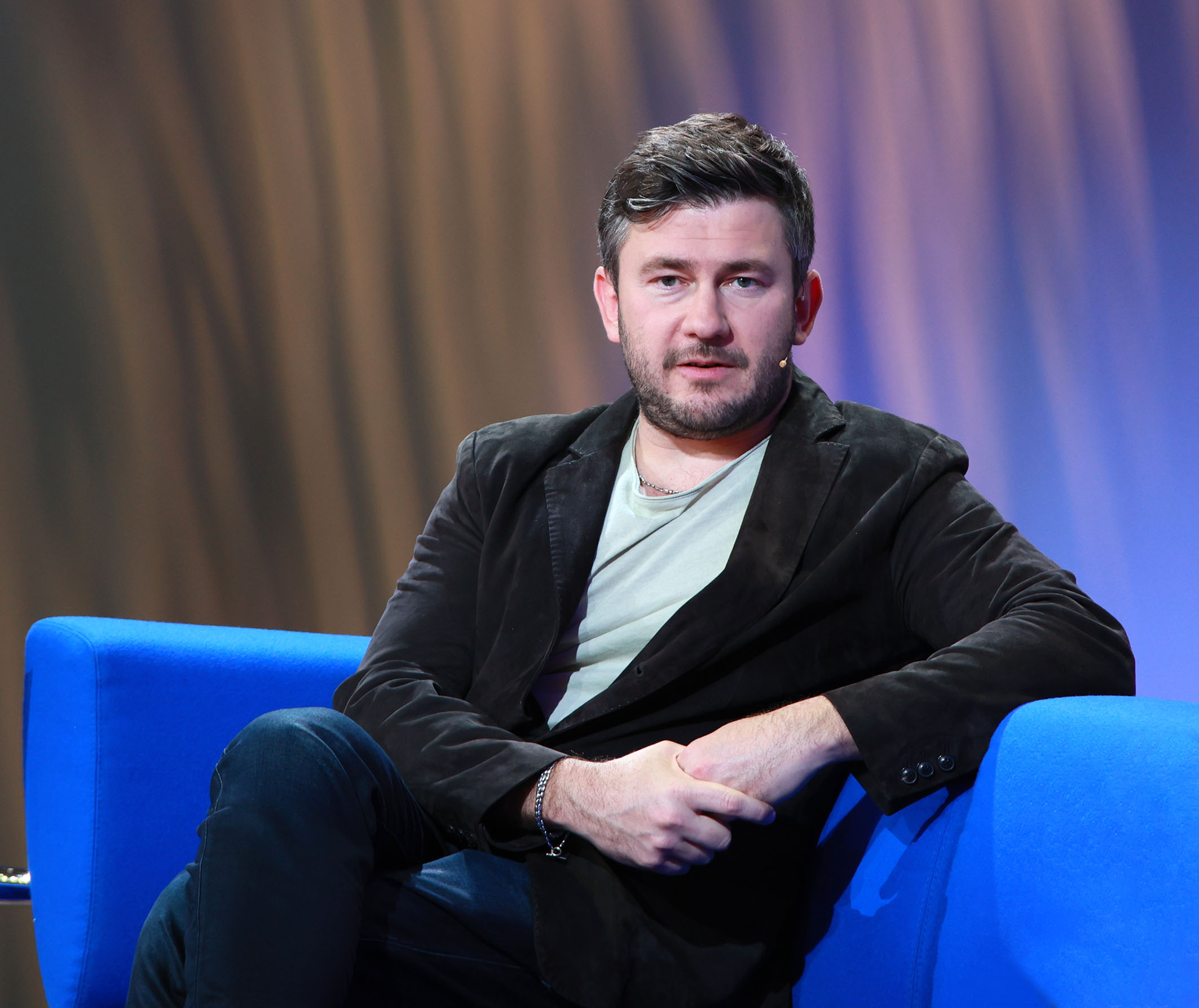
- Glukhovsky in 2022
- Born: Dmitry Alekseyevich Glukhovsky; 12 June 1979 (age 47); Moscow, Russian SFSR, Soviet Union
- Citizenship: Russia; Israel
- Education: Hebrew University of Jerusalem
- Occupation: Author
- Writing career
- Years active: 2001–present
- Genres: Science fiction, magic realism, dystopian, post-apocalyptic
- Notable works: Metro 2033, Metro 2034, Metro 2035

Dmitry Alekseyevich Glukhovsky (Russian: Дмитрий Алексеевич Глуховский, born 12 June 1979) is a Russian and Israeli author, best known for the science fiction novel Metro 2033 and its sequels. As a journalist, Glukhovsky has worked for Euronews, RT in its early years, and others. Aside from his native Moscow, Glukhovsky has also lived in Israel, Germany, and France. He lives outside Russia after being labelled a foreign agent and sentenced in absentia to eight years in prison for violating censorship laws relating to the invasion of Ukraine.

== Biography ==
=== Personal life and activism ===
Dmitry Glukhovsky was born and raised in Moscow. His father Alexei worked as an editor for Gosteleradio, while his mother, Larisa, worked as a photo editor for TASS agency. He graduated from Moscow School No. 12, a school specialising in French-language education in the Arbat District, which later became part of School No. 1231. He developed the idea for his post-apocalyptic novel Metro 2033 at the age of 15. At the age of 17, he left Russia to study in Israel and lived there for four and a half years. While living in Israel, Glukhovsky studied journalism and international relations at the Hebrew University of Jerusalem, where he earned his degree.

The writer was married to producer Elena Glukhovskaya, whom he met while working at Russia Today. The couple have two children. On vDud, Glukhovsky revealed he and Elena divorced earlier in 2020.

In 2021, Glukhovsky publicly denounced the arrest of Russian opposition activist Alexei Navalny and demanded his release in an online video. In the wake of the Russian invasion of Ukraine, Glukhovsky has shown support to Ukraine, including a public statement aired on Arte. On 7 June 2022, Glukhovsky revealed he was placed on the Russian federal wanted list; he wrote on his Telegram channel that he was accused of discrediting the Russian Armed Forces due to a post he made on Instagram. A Moscow district court ordered Glukhovsky's arrest in absentia which was issued on 13 May. In October, Glukhovsky was added to the list of foreign agents by the Russian justice ministry. On 7 August 2023, Glukhovsky was handed an 8-year prison sentence in absentia.

== Career ==
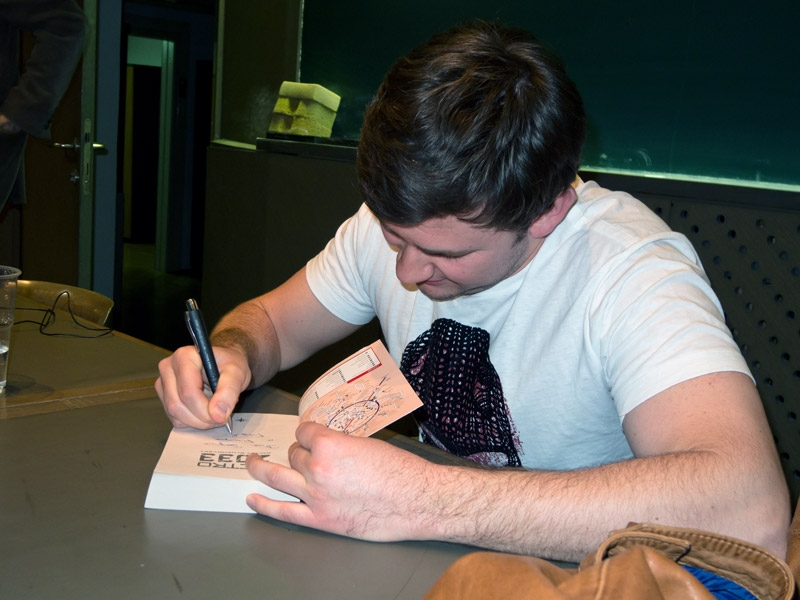
Dmitry Glukhovsky signing a copy of Metro 2033 at SFeraKon 2012

=== 2005–2009: early literary career and first success ===
Glukhovsky gained wide recognition with Metro 2033, a post-apocalyptic novel set in the Moscow Metro after a nuclear war. According to Kommersant/Ogonyok, he first published the novel online in 2002 after receiving rejections from publishers, and the book was later released by Eksmo in 2005. The novel became his breakthrough work and established the fictional world that later developed into the wider Metro series and video game franchise.

His second novel, Sumerki (Сумерки), was published in 2007. Unlike Metro 2033, it was not set in the Metro universe and combined elements of mystery, fantasy and apocalyptic fiction. The novel follows a Moscow translator working with a mysterious manuscript connected to a sixteenth-century expedition to Yucatán, while the text gradually becomes linked to events in the present day. In 2014, the French edition of Sumerki, translated by Denis E. Savine and published by L’Atalante, won the Prix Utopiales Européen.

In 2009, Glukhovsky returned to the Metro setting with Metro 2034, published in Moscow by AST. The novel continued the post-apocalyptic world introduced in Metro 2033, but focused on a different group of characters, including Hunter, Homer and Sasha. Its plot centres on the station Sevastopolskaya, an isolated underground community whose survival is threatened after contact with the wider Metro is disrupted.

=== 2010–2016: wider fiction and video games ===
In 2010, Glukhovsky published Stories about the Motherland (Рассказы о Родине), a collection of short stories that moved away from the post-apocalyptic setting of Metro and into contemporary social and political satire. A 2013 profile in Publishing Perspectives described the book as a series of satirical stories about contemporary Russia.

The same year, the Metro 2033 video game was released, bringing Glukhovsky’s fictional universe into the international video game market. The game was based on his novel, and Glukhovsky was credited for the story together with Andrew Prokhorov and Vyacheslav Aristov. It also received recognition from the games industry: at the 2011 D.I.C.E. Awards, it was nominated for Outstanding Achievement in Visual Engineering and Outstanding Achievement in Story.

In 2013, Glukhovsky published Futu.re (Будущее), a dystopian science-fiction novel set in a future Europe where humanity has achieved biological immortality. The novel explores the social and moral consequences of eternal life, especially the conflict between immortality and the right to have children. Glukhovsky described the book as an experimental work that differed strongly from his earlier Metro novels. The French edition later won the Prix Libr’à Nous in the “Imaginaire” category in 2016, and the Polish edition received the Lubimyczytać.pl Book of the Year 2015 title in the science-fiction category.

Also in 2013, Glukhovsky continued his work with the video game franchise through Metro: Last Light, the sequel to Metro 2033. The game was based on the world of Metro 2033 and continued the story of the Metro universe as a narrative-driven post-apocalyptic shooter. Glukhovsky was credited as a script writer for the game, and MobyGames also notes that he contributed to its story and dialogue. The game was nominated for Best Shooter at the 2013 VGX Awards.

In 2015, Glukhovsky published Metro 2035, the final novel of the main Metro trilogy. Kommersant/Ogonyok described it as the completion of the trilogy, while Glukhovsky said in the same interview that the novel was intended not only as post-apocalyptic fiction but also as a book about Russian society. Later that year, Metro 2035 won the Ozon.ru Online Awards / Book Prize of Runet as the best fiction book according to user voting.

=== 2017–2021: Expansion into film, theatre, television and audio fiction ===
In 2017, Glukhovsky published Text (Текст), which was presented on release as his first realist novel and marked a move away from the science-fiction and dystopian settings associated with his earlier work. The novel received attention from Russian literary critics, including Pavel Basinsky in God Literatury and Galina Yuzefovich in Meduza, who discussed it as a significant new work in contemporary Russian prose. Text was included in the longlist and later the shortlist of the 2017 NOS Literary Prize.

In 2018, Text was adapted for the stage by director Maxim Didenko at the Yermolova Theatre in Moscow. The production was presented as a stage version of Glukhovsky’s novel about technology, identity and digital communication, with the smartphone becoming an important dramatic element.

In 2019, Glukhovsky wrote The Outpost (Пост), a post-apocalyptic audio serial released as a Storytel Original and narrated by the author himself. The project was created specifically for audio rather than as a conventional printed novel: Glukhovsky described it as an experiment that applied techniques of television and film drama to linear audio storytelling. The first season was structured as an episodic series, with ten episodes of about 45–50 minutes, and was later translated for several international Storytel markets, including English.

Also in 2019, the Metro video game franchise continued with Metro Exodus, developed by 4A Games and published by Deep Silver. Deep Silver describes Glukhovsky as the creator of the expanded Metro universe, including the video games developed by 4A Games, and states that the story of Metro Exodus was co-developed in close collaboration with him. The game received major international industry recognition: it was nominated for Best Action Game at The Game Awards 2019, for Outstanding Technical Achievement at the 23rd D.I.C.E. Awards, and for Technical Achievement at the 2020 BAFTA Games Awards.

The same year, Text was adapted into a feature film directed by Klim Shipenko, with Glukhovsky writing the screenplay based on his own novel. The film starred Alexander Petrov, Ivan Yankovsky and Kristina Asmus. It received major recognition at the Russian national film awards: at the Golden Eagle Awards for 2019, Text won Best Film. Glukhovsky later won the Nika Award for Best Screenplay for the adaptation.

In 2020, Glukhovsky’s short story Sulphur (Сера) was adapted into a short film directed by Lana Vlady. The film was described as a psychological thriller based on Glukhovsky’s story and won the main prize in the short-film competition at Kinotavr 2020.

In 2021, Glukhovsky continued the project with The Outpost 2: To Save and Preserve (Пост. Спастись и сохранить), released on Storytel as the second and final part of the audio serial. The continuation consisted of eleven episodes, all narrated by Glukhovsky, and used a more elaborate sound design, including folk music performed by the Omut Quartet.

Also 2021, Glukhovsky wrote Topi (Топи, The Swamp), a mystical thriller series directed by Vladimir Mirzoyev and released on Kinopoisk HD. The project was Glukhovsky’s first television series and, unlike Text, was not an adaptation of a previously published novel but an original screen project. The series starred Ivan Yankovsky, Tikhon Zhiznevsky, Anastasia Krylova, Katerina Shpitsa and Sofia Volodchinskaya.

=== 2023–present: International theatre, political writing and VR projects ===
In 2023, Glukhovsky wrote The White Factory, an English-language play staged at London’s Marylebone Theatre and directed by Maxim Didenko. The production was presented as the world premiere of a collaboration between Ukrainian, Russian and British creatives, with Glukhovsky credited as writer and Didenko as director. The play is centred on the Łódź ghetto during the Holocaust and examines moral compromise, survival and responsibility under occupation. The Guardian gave the production a five-star review, describing it as a “superb play” and praising its writing, performance and production.

In 2024, Glukhovsky published We. Diary of a Fall (Мы. Дневник падения) with Vidim Books. Unlike his earlier novels, the book is a collection of journalistic and political writings. Novaya Gazeta Europe describes it as a collection of articles published by Vidim Books, while the publisher presents it as a sequence of notes responding to political events and everyday life, forming a chronicle of Russia’s development from 2012 to the invasion of Ukraine. The book therefore marked a later phase of Glukhovsky’s career focused on political commentary and documentary-style reflection.

Also in 2024, the Metro franchise expanded into virtual reality with Metro Awakening, developed by Vertigo Games. The game was presented as a story-driven VR title and an origin story from Metro creator Dmitry Glukhovsky, bringing the franchise into a new format outside the mainline 4A Games series. Metro Awakening received international games-industry recognition: it was nominated for Best VR/AR Game at The Game Awards 2024 and won VR Game of the Year at the 2024 Steam Awards.

In 2026, 4A Games and Deep Silver announced Metro 2039, the next mainline game in the Metro video game series. Unlike Metro Awakening, which was a VR prequel, Metro 2039 was presented as a new mainline entry with an original story developed by 4A Games in collaboration with Glukhovsky. 4A Games stated that the new story had been created together with him and shaped by shared themes of freedom and truth.

On 17 September 2026, Glukhovsky released his novel Registration (Регистрация), making the complete text available free of charge through his official Telegram channel. He compared this approach to the initial publication of Metro 2033 in 2002, when he made the novel freely available online. Glukhovsky explained that his aim was to reach a wider readership, stating that publication in Russia was not possible because of the novel's subject matter, while Russian émigré publishers had limited distribution capabilities. Set in contemporary Russia during the Russian invasion of Ukraine, the novel follows Ulyana, a pregnant woman whose partner goes missing while serving in the Russian military. The book explores the effects of the war on Russian society and prompted public debate about its portrayal of those who remained in Russia and those who emigrated.

=== Journalism ===
From 2002 to 2007, he worked at the global European media platform Euronews in Lyon, France, after which he returned to Russia and continued his career at the newly created Russia Today (RT). Over the course of three years he traveled halfway around the world, was a Kremlin pool journalist, visited the Baikonur Cosmodrome and the exclusion zone of the Chernobyl Nuclear Power Plant, as well as the North Pole, and covered the 2006 Lebanon War as a war correspondent. He has also worked with the German radio station Deutsche Welle and the British television channel Sky News. From 2007 to 2009, he worked at Radio Mayak.

== Bibliography ==
=== Novels ===
Name	Year of publication	Notes
Metro 2033	2005	The novel Metro 2033 (Метро 2033) marked the beginning of Glukhovsky's Metro series. It was first published as an ebook in 2002 and later, in 2005, reworked for print. Set in the Moscow Metro after World War III, the novel became the basis for the entire Metro franchise, including the subsequent video game adaptation.
Sumerki	2007	The novel Sumerki (Сумерки) was published in Russian in 2007. It is a mystical/fantasy thriller set between modern-day Moscow and the 16th-century Yucatan. It was later translated into German by David Drews and published by Heyne in 2010, and into French by Denis E. Savin and published by L'Atalante in 2014. The French edition won the 2014 Utopiales European Literary Prize.
Metro 2034	2009	Metro 2034 (Метро 2034), the novel that continued Glukhovsky's Metro series after Metro 2033, was first published in Moscow by AST in 2009, and later, in 2014, in an English translation by Andrew Bromfield by Gollancz. The novel takes place a year after the events of Metro 2033 and follows characters including Hunter, Homer, and Sasha, who face new dangers in the Moscow Metro after the devastation of war.
Futu.re	2013	Futu.re is a science fiction novel by Dmitry Glukhovsky, published in Russian under the title Будущее in 2013. The novel is set in a future Europe where humanity has learned to halt aging, creating a society built on a form of immortality. To control the population, this society adheres to the "Law of Choice," which requires a couple wishing to have a child to declare the pregnancy to the state and choose one parent to forgo immortality. The story follows Matricula 717, a member of the Phalanx responsible for tracking down individuals who violate this law. The English edition of Futu.re was published in 2015, and the novel has been translated into several other languages, including German, Spanish, Polish, French, Czech, Lithuanian, and Slovak.
Metro 2035	2015	Metro 2035 (Метро 2035) is the final book in Glukhovsky's Metro trilogy. It was first published in Russian by AST in 2015, with an English edition following in 2016. Set twenty years after World War III, the novel depicts life in the Moscow Metro, where the remaining population survives underground, and the stations are divided by warring religions and political ideologies. The story follows Artyom, who searches for signs of life beyond the metro and hopes to lead its inhabitants to the surface.
Text	2017	Text (Текст) is a realistic cyber-noir novel by Glukhovsky, published by AST in 2017. Set in modern-day Moscow and the underground city of Lobnya, the novel centers on Ilya Goryunov, a former philology student released after seven years in prison for planting drugs on him during a police search. After taking revenge on the officer who ruined his life, Ilya gains access to the officer's smartphone and begins to infiltrate another man's digital life. The novel was later adapted for the stage by director Maxim Didenko at the Yermolova Theater in 2018, and in 2019 it was adapted into a film directed by Klim Shipenko, with a screenplay by Glukhovsky.
The Outpost 1	2019	The Outpost 1 (Пост) is a post-apocalyptic audio novel by Glukhovsky, released in 2019 as a Storytel Original project and narrated by the author himself. The first part takes place after a brief and brutal civil war, when the remnants of Russia call themselves the Muscovite Empire, and its eastern border runs along the poisoned Volga. The plot centers on the Yaroslavl outpost, where guards guard the only bridge across the river; for years, no one has come from the other side, until a mysterious appearance changes life at the outpost.
The Outpost 2	2021	The Outpost 2 (Пост. Спастись и сохранить) is the second and final installment in Glukhovsky's novel The Outpost. It was released as an original audio series by Storytel Original in 2021. The action shifts to fortified Moscow, ruled by the emperor, where Cossack detachments are sent beyond the Volga to investigate why scouts have disappeared and border posts have fallen silent. The plot connects this mission with the survivors of the first installment, including a boy and a pregnant girl, who know what happened across the river.
Registraciya	2026	Registration (Регистрация) is a contemporary social and political novel set in Russia during the Russian invasion of Ukraine. The story begins in Vologda, where Ulyana, a thirty-year-old beauty salon employee, discovers that she is pregnant by her boyfriend Sasha, a contract soldier who has gone missing during the war. After learning that Sasha is alive but seriously wounded and hospitalised in Moscow, Ulyana travels to the capital to find him. A conflict develops between Ulyana and Sasha's mother, Tatyana, over their competing claims to the financial compensation associated with his military service. Through the experiences of these characters, the novel explores the impact of the war on Russian civilian life, examining family relationships, financial pressures and moral compromises.

=== Other books / Story collections ===
Name	Year of publication	Notes
Stories about the Motherland	2010	Stories about the Motherland (Рассказы о Родине) is Glukhovsky’s short-story collection, published in Russian by AST and Astrel in Moscow in 2010. The collection uses satire and grotesque fiction to discuss contemporary Russia, including themes such as patriotism, state power, propaganda, corruption and society.
We. Diary of a Fall	2024	We. Diary of a Fall (Мы. Дневник падения) is a Russian-language collection of journalistic and political writings by Glukhovsky, published by Vidim Books in 2024. The book brings together notes and columns written in response to political events and everyday life, forming a chronicle of Russia's political development from 2012 to the war in Ukraine. In the 2024 edition, Glukhovsky comments on these earlier texts, using them to analyze the disappearance of freedom and democracy, the militarization of state ideology, and Russia's descent into war.

== Filmography ==
=== Films ===
Name	Release year	Notes
Text	2019	Text (Текст) is the 2019 Russian film adaptation of Glukhovsky’s novel of the same name. The film was directed by Klim Shipenko and produced by START and Central Partnership, with Alexander Petrov playing Ilya Goryunov, a former student who spent seven years in prison after being falsely convicted on a drug charge. After his release, Ilya confronts Pyotr Khazin, the officer who planted the drugs on him, and gains access to Khazin’s smartphone, gradually entering his digital life. The film received the Golden Eagle Award for Best Film, while Glukhovsky received the Nika Award for Best Screenplay.

=== TV shows ===
Name	Release year	Notes
The Swamp	2021	The Swamp (Топи) is a 2021 Russian mystical thriller television series written by Glukhovsky and directed by Vladimir Mirzoev. It premiered on Kinopoisk HD on 28 January 2021. The series follows a group of young Muscovites who travel to a remote northern village and monastery in search of help and answers to personal crises. One of the central characters is Denis Titov, played by Ivan Yankovsky, a terminally ill startup founder seeking a cure. Their journey turns into a disturbing encounter with disappearances, strange events and the unsettling world of the Russian backwoods.

=== Short films ===
Name	Release year	Notes
Sulphur	2020	Sulphur (Сера) is a 2020 Russian short psychological thriller based on Glukhovsky’s short story of the same name. Directed by Lana Vlady and written by Glukhovsky and Vlady, the film is set in Norilsk, where a young policewoman investigates a murder and questions the victim’s wife, gradually moving away from the simple question of who is guilty. The film stars Anna Slyu and Natalia Chumburidze and won the main prize in the short-film competition at Kinotavr 2020.

== Video games ==
The Metro video game series is based on the fictional universe created by Glukhovsky in his Metro novels. The games adapt and expand this setting across several titles, with Glukhovsky's involvement ranging from the creation of the original literary source material to story collaboration on later games, including Metro Exodus, Metro Awakening, and Metro 2039. The following table summarises the main Metro video games connected to his work.

Name	Year of release	Notes
Metro 2033	2010	The Metro video game series is a series of post-apocalyptic first-person shooters set primarily in the Moscow Metro after a nuclear disaster. Based on the literary universe created by Dmitry Glukhovsky, the games combine elements of survival horror, stealth, action, political conflict, and moral choice. Le Monde described Metro 2033 as an atmospheric shooter adapted from Glukhovsky's novel, with strong narrative elements and an emphasis on survival in the underground world of the metro.
Metro: Last Light	2013	Metro: Last Light is a post-apocalyptic first-person shooter developed by 4A Games and set in a universe created by Dmitry Glukhovsky. The game continues Artyom's story after the events of Metro 2033, exploring his guilt over the destruction of the Dark Ones and his subsequent mission to rescue the surviving Dark One. Critics described the game as a more mature and dynamic sequel, combining an atmospheric story with survival horror, stealth, and combat in the tunnels and ruins of post-apocalyptic Moscow.
Metro Exodus	2019	Metro Exodus is a post-apocalyptic first-person shooter developed by 4A Games and published by Deep Silver. The game continues Artyom's story after the events of Metro: Last Light, where he and other survivors escape the Moscow Metro on the Aurora locomotive and travel across post-apocalyptic Russia in search of a new home. Compared to previous games, which primarily took place in underground tunnels, Metro Exodus combines linear story missions with larger, open-world locations. Critics have noted that the game retains the atmosphere of the survival horror series while expanding its setting beyond Moscow.
Metro Awakening	2024	Metro Awakening is a first-person, story-driven virtual reality adventure game developed by Vertigo Games as part of the Metro series. Unlike previous games in the main series, it doesn't tell Artyom's story, but focuses on Serdar, also known as Khan, a doctor searching for his wife in the mutant-infested tunnels beneath Moscow. Dmitry Glukhovsky, a screenwriter associated with the Metro series, served as a lore consultant for the game.
Metro 2039	2027	Metro 2039 is the upcoming fourth main game in the Metro video game series, developed by 4A Games. The game returns to the Moscow Metro, with Artyom replaced as the main protagonist by a new character, the "Stranger." The story takes place in a metro system controlled by a fascist regime led by Hunter, and Dmitry Glukhovsky returns to help develop the game's story.

== Theatre ==
Name	Year of premiere	Notes
Text	2018	Text was adapted for the stage in 2018 at the Yermolova Theatre, directed by Maxim Didenko. Based on Glukhovsky's 2017 novel, the production was presented in the cyber-noir genre, exploring the role of smartphones and digital identity in modern life. The premiere was scheduled for May 15 and 16, 2018.
The White Factory	2023	The White Factory is Glukhovsky’s stage play, directed by Maxim Didenko and premiered at the Marylebone Theatre in London in 2023. The play follows Yosef Kaufman, a Holocaust survivor from the Łódź ghetto, whose attempt to build a new life in 1960s Brooklyn is shaped by memories of his wartime past. The production ran from 14 September to 4 November 2023. It received positive reviews from British theatre critics, including a five-star review from The Guardian, and received the 2024 Offie for Production (Plays).
