= Metro 2033 (novel) =

2002 novel by Dmitry Glukhovsky

- Original Russian edition cover
- Author: Dmitry Glukhovsky
- Language: Russian (original)
- Series: Metro
- Genre: Post-apocalyptic
- Publisher: Eksmo (original); Gollancz (English edition)
- Publication date: 2002/2005 (Russia); 18 March 2010 (U.S.)
- Publication place: Russia
- Media type: Print (hardcover, paperback); E-book; Audiobook
- Pages: 544 (Russian edition); 458 (English edition)
- ISBN: 978-5-17-059678-2
- Followed by: Metro 2034

Metro 2033 (Russian: Метро 2033) is a 2002 post-apocalyptic fiction novel by Russian author Dmitry Glukhovsky. It is set within the Moscow Metro, where the last survivors hide after a global nuclear holocaust. It has been followed by two sequels, Metro 2034 and Metro 2035, and spawned the Metro media franchise. The book's English edition was published as a tie-in with its video game adaptation in 2010.

== Synopsis ==
=== Background ===
In 2013, a nuclear war forced a large amount of Moscow's surviving population to relocate to the city's Metro system in search of refuge. Eventually, communities settled within the underground train stations and developed into independent states over time. Factions emerged, ranging from the independent peacekeepers the "Rangers of the Order", to the neo-Stalinist Red Line faction and the neo-Nazi Fourth Reich, to the more powerful factions such as Polis, which contained the greatest military power and the most knowledge of the past, and the Commonwealth of Ring Stations (nicknamed Hansa, after the Hanseatic League), which controlled the main ring of metro stations through its sheer economic power.

As these groups began to evolve, the Red Line and the Fourth Reich quickly entered a state of war, as both sought to destroy the other. As the war raged, the stations that refused to join either side were either demolished by the factions, merged into the Hansa regime, raided by criminal bandits, or formed their own independent states. Other stations were outright destroyed by animals, mutated by the nuclear fallout. While most of the stations were controlled by the three main factions, some stations formed independent alliances, including the station VDNKh (Exhibition). Within that station, the events of Metro 2033 unfold.

=== Plot ===
The protagonist of the novel is a 24-year-old man named Artyom who was born before the nuclear war. He was saved from a horde of carnivorous rats that killed his mother and the inhabitants of his station as a baby by Sukhoi, a military officer. Sukhoi is now one of the authorities of VDNKh, one of the stations in the Metro, and has raised Artyom as his son. Artyom spends his time on patrol in the tunnels and working in the mushroom factories.

Artyom meets a man named Hunter, who is looking for Sukhoi. The three meet and discuss the situation in VDNKh. VDNKh is facing increasing attacks from mysterious creatures known as "The Dark Ones", who inspire terror throughout the station. Hunter leaves, but asks to speak to Artyom. Artyom confesses that 10 years earlier, he and his friend went to the surface at the neighbouring station, Botanical Gardens. They were unable to seal the exit after their visit and the Dark Ones have been using this entrance to the metro ever since. Hunter tells Artyom that he intends to gather intel on the Dark Ones, and in the event that he does not return Artyom must carry a message to a man named Melnik at Polis with news of the threat. Feeling a sense of responsibility for the Dark Ones' attacks and seeking adventure, Artyom accepts.

Artyom begins to journey towards the centre of the Metro. His first companion, Bourbon, is killed by a psychic force transmitted through the pipes and Artyom is then guided by a mystic named Khan. Khan leads him to Kitai-Gorod which is controlled by criminal gangs, but they become separated during an attack by the Fourth Reich. Artyom flees, only to be captured by the Reich who sentence him to death for killing an officer. Just before his execution, a band of revolutionary fighters intervene and rescue him. Pursued by the Reich, Artyom is left at Paveletskaya station and his route to Polis is blocked by the Hansa controlled Koltsevaya Line, who operate strict border controls. Artyom's passport was lost during his detention, and after a failed attempt to gain travel papers by betting on rat races, Artyom is taken into custody. After escaping, he finally reaches Polis. He delivers his message to Melnik, commander of the military organization named Spartan Order, and the council of Polis gather to determine their course of action.

Although Polis do not agree to intervene, a faction known as the Brahmins (who consist of scientists and academics who collect books from the library above), contact Artyom. They offer a solution to the threat of the Dark Ones in exchange for Artyom's help in recovering a sacred book, as they believe him to be psychically sensitive. Artyom travels to the surface with Melnik and a young Brahmin called Daniel. They enter the library and are attacked by the 'librarians', mutated creatures that reside there. Daniel is mortally wounded, but before dying, gives Artyom his reward anyway. It is an envelope containing directions to a functioning missile silo. Artyom and Melnik flee without the book and re-enter the metro, arriving at station Kievskaya. Melnik leaves Artyom at the station while he goes to collect reinforcements but whilst he is away, Artyom becomes involved in the search for a missing child, Oleg. Artyom and Oleg's father are abducted by a tribe of cannibals who worship 'The Great Worm' while following the trail left by the child. They are rescued by Melnik and a squad of fighters and they escape into Metro-2, a secret set of tunnels that lead to the missile site.

The team pass through the metro station leading to the Kremlin, which contains a mutated bio-weapon that attempts to hypnotize and consume them. Several are killed, including Oleg, before they explode a tank of fuel to distract it. The majority of the group go to the surface and the missile silo, while Artyom is accompanied back through the metro so that they can provide targeting co-ordinates from a suitable location, Ostankino Tower. On the way, they stop at VDNKh, which has been almost overrun by Dark Ones. After a brief re-union with Sukhoi, Artyom reaches the tower and his team provide the missile site with the location of the Dark Ones hive. As they do, Artyom has a vision, which relates to the dreams and nightmares that he has been having. The Dark Ones had been trying to make contact, unable to communicate with the human survivors within the metro in a meaningful way, before they found Artyom. Artyom re-evaluates their behavior and realizes that what was seen as aggression were actually attempts to make contact, which were only met with violence. As Artyom realizes that the two races could co-operate, the missiles fall and the Dark Ones are killed. Realising that the Dark Ones were killed senselessly, Artyom tears his mask off and heads back home in tears.

== Publication ==
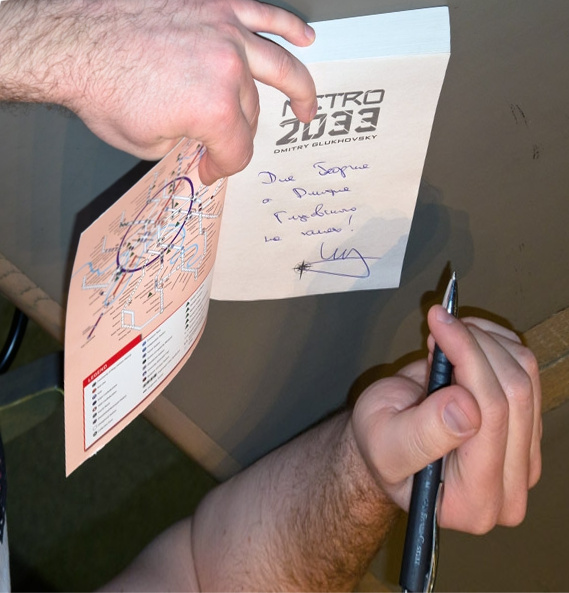
Dmitry Glukhovsky signing a copy of Metro 2033 at SFeraKon 2012

The book first appeared online in 2002 and later became an interactive experiment, drawing in thousands of readers from around Russia and abroad. In 2005, it was printed by Eksmo and became a nationwide and worldwide bestseller. The English edition was released on 18 March 2010 to coincide with the release of the video game adaptation of the novel.

== Reception ==
By 2010, over 500,000 copies of Metro 2033 had been sold in Russia alone. Over 2 million had read the book on its official site before it even was published in print. Foreign book rights have been sold to dozens of countries. In 2007, Glukhovsky was awarded the Encouragement Award of the European Science Fiction Society at the Eurocon for Metro 2033.

== Adaptations ==
=== Video game ===
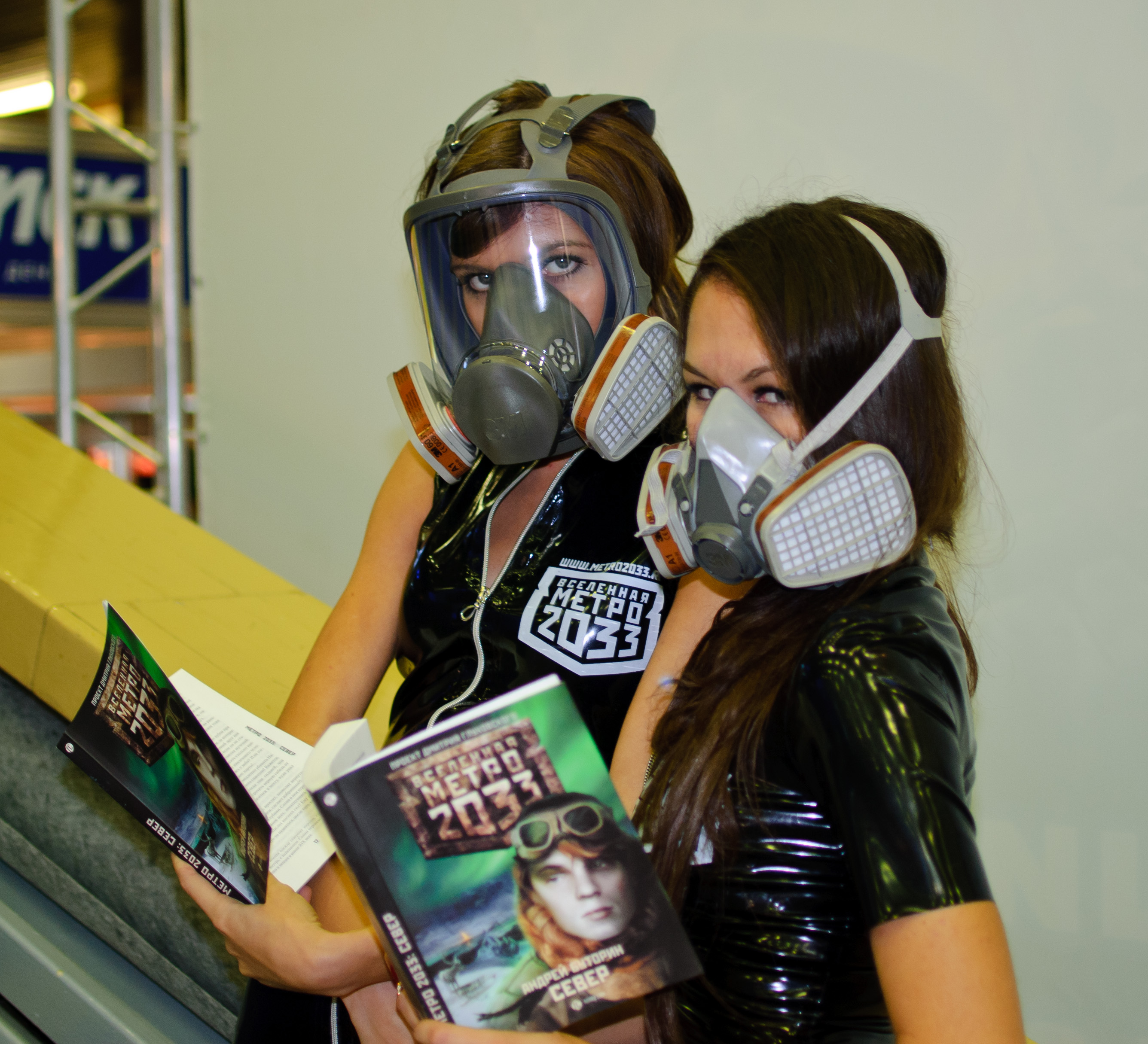
Promotional models for the video game adaptation with copies of the book at IgroMir 2010

First-person shooter video game Metro 2033, developed by the Ukrainian studio 4A Games, was released worldwide in 2010. Glukhovsky said that he had chosen a video game adaptation over a film as it gave him more artistic freedom to work. Two sequels also developed by 4A Games, Metro: Last Light and Metro Exodus, were released in 2013 and 2019.

A VR exclusive spinoff to the mainline Metro video game franchise released in 2024 developed by Vertigo Games called Metro Awakening.

=== Film projects ===
As of November 2010, Glukhovsky had been in talks with Hollywood-based studios and producers to sell the film rights. By 2012, MGM had picked up the screen rights to Metro 2033, setting F. Scott Frazier "Pavito" to pen the script. Mark Johnson was producing via his Gran Via Productions. However, the production was canceled and the rights were returned to Glukhovsky after he refused to have the film be Americanized and set in Washington instead of Moscow. In December 2018, Glukhovsky explained: "In Washington DC, Nazis don't work, Communists don't work at all, and the Dark Ones don't work. Washington DC is a black city basically. That's not at all the allusion I want to have [with the Dark Ones], it's a metaphor of general xenophobia but it's not a comment on African Americans at all."

On 23 August 2019, Glukhovsky announced the film adaptation of the novel was set to release in January 2022. The film was to be created by TNT-Premier, TV-3 and Central Partnership. Glukhovsky explained: "In Russia, I didn't see any producers who could make a good screen adaptation of this book. It just seemed impossible. But now I finally met a team that I can entrust Metro with. Our ambitions turned out to be similar: to create a world-class blockbuster and stun even those who have read the trilogy and know it by heart. So as not to disappoint them, I am ready to become a creative producer of the movie and help create it with both my advice and action." Due to the COVID-19 pandemic, production of the film adaptation was delayed and moving forward with a new 2024 release date. Metro 2033 would be directed by Egor Baranov while Dmitry Glukhovsky would write the original script for the new movie adaptation. Following his comments on the arrest of Alexei Navalny and the Russian invasion of Ukraine, Glukhovsky has stated he has been put on a wanted list and blacklisted by the government from any creative productions in Russia, therefore the current film production of Metro 2033 has been cancelled indefinitely.

== Sequels and franchise ==
Glukhovsky's follow-up novel Metro 2034 was published in 2009, followed by Metro 2035 in 2015. In addition, many other authors have published scores of volumes in the Universe of Metro 2033; anthologies of short stories have been also published and some authors have created their personal underground universes based in other metropolitan areas.
