= Zwonowice =

- Village
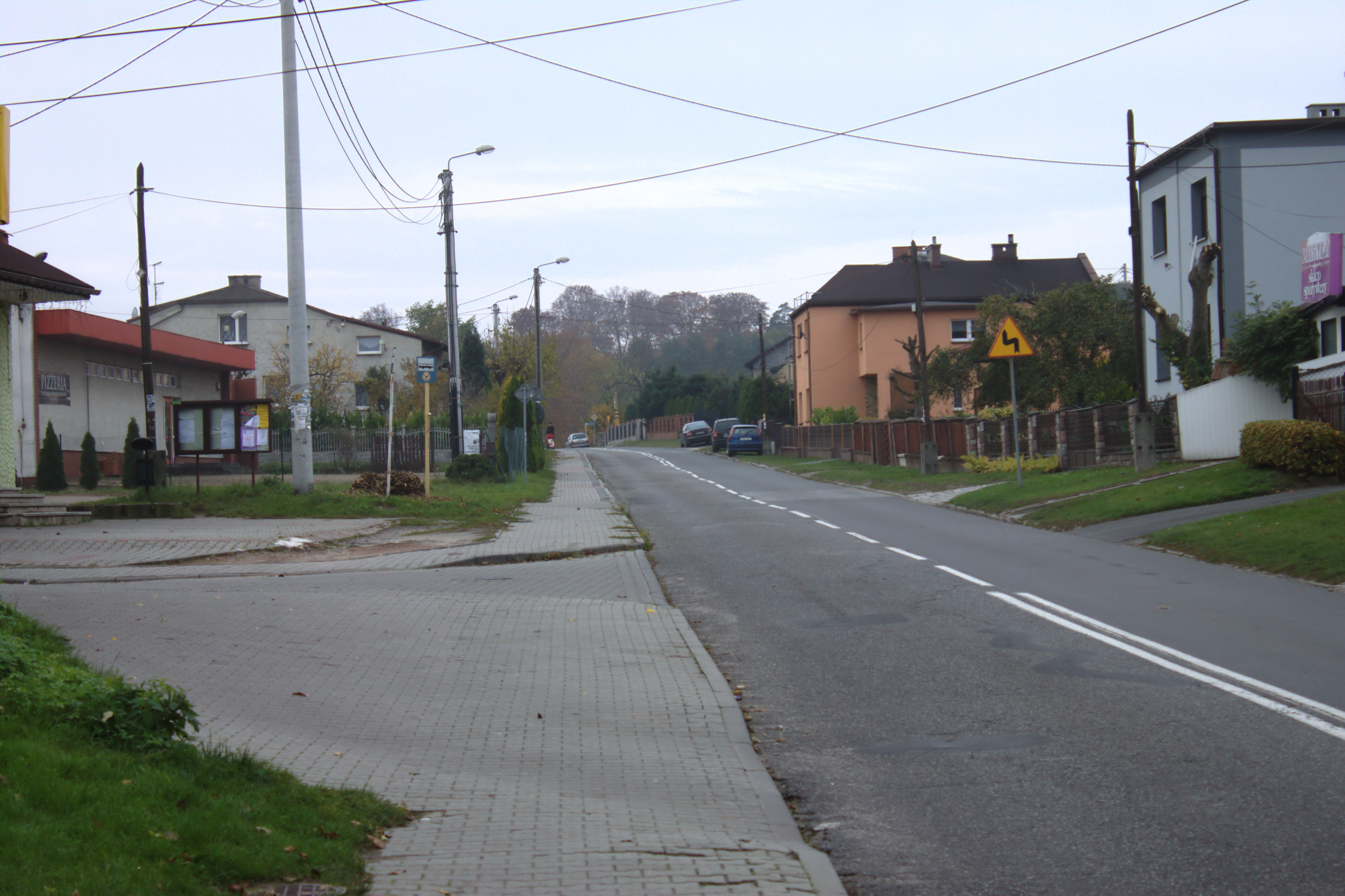
- Road

- Location within Poland
- Coordinates: 50°9′N 18°27′E
- Country: Poland
- Voivodeship: Silesian
- County: Rybnik
- Gmina: Lyski
- Population: 1,255

Zwonowice [zvɔnɔˈvit͡sɛ] is a village in the administrative district of Gmina Lyski, within Rybnik County, Silesian Voivodeship, in southern Poland.

== Gallery ==
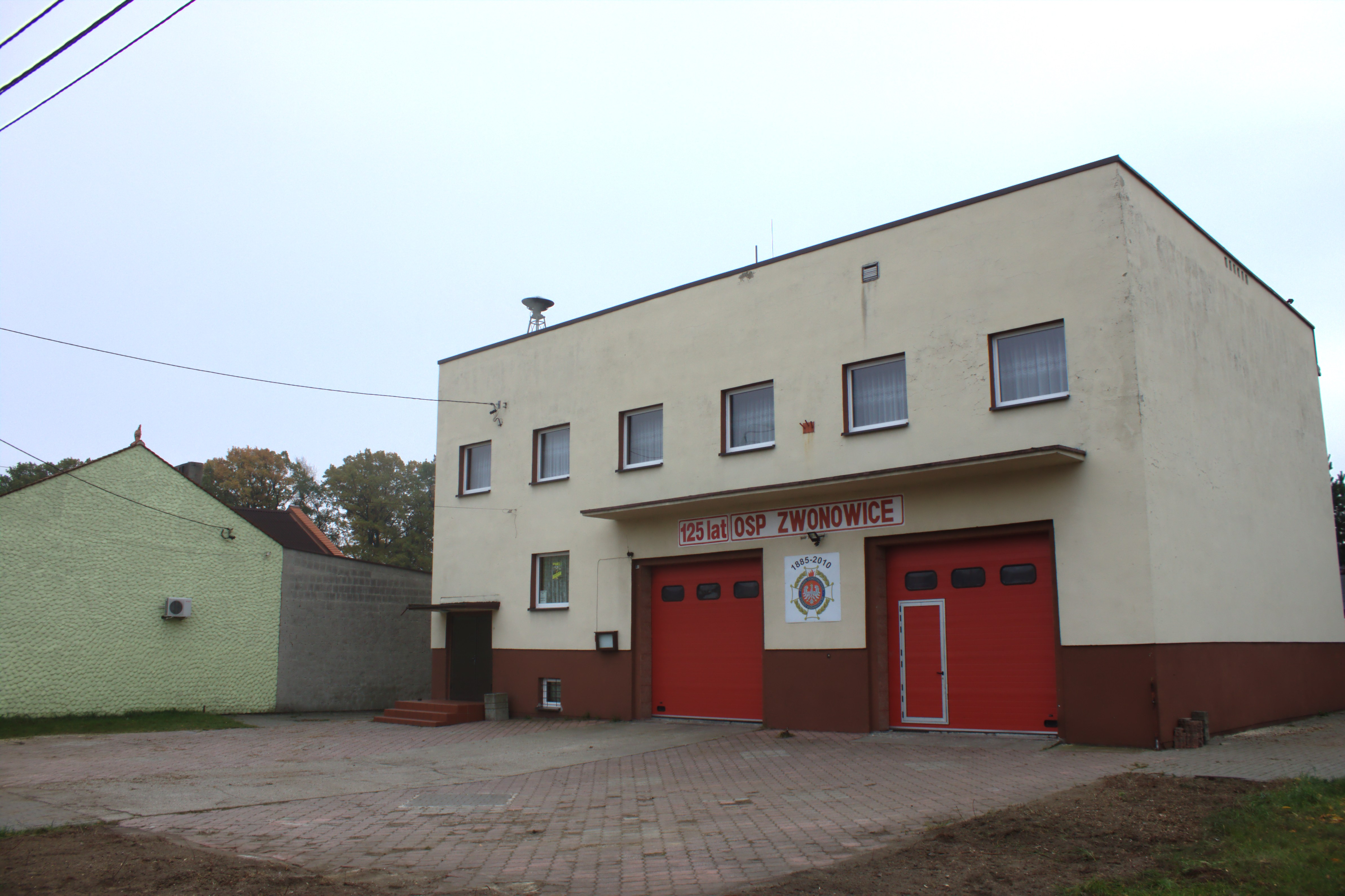
Fire department station

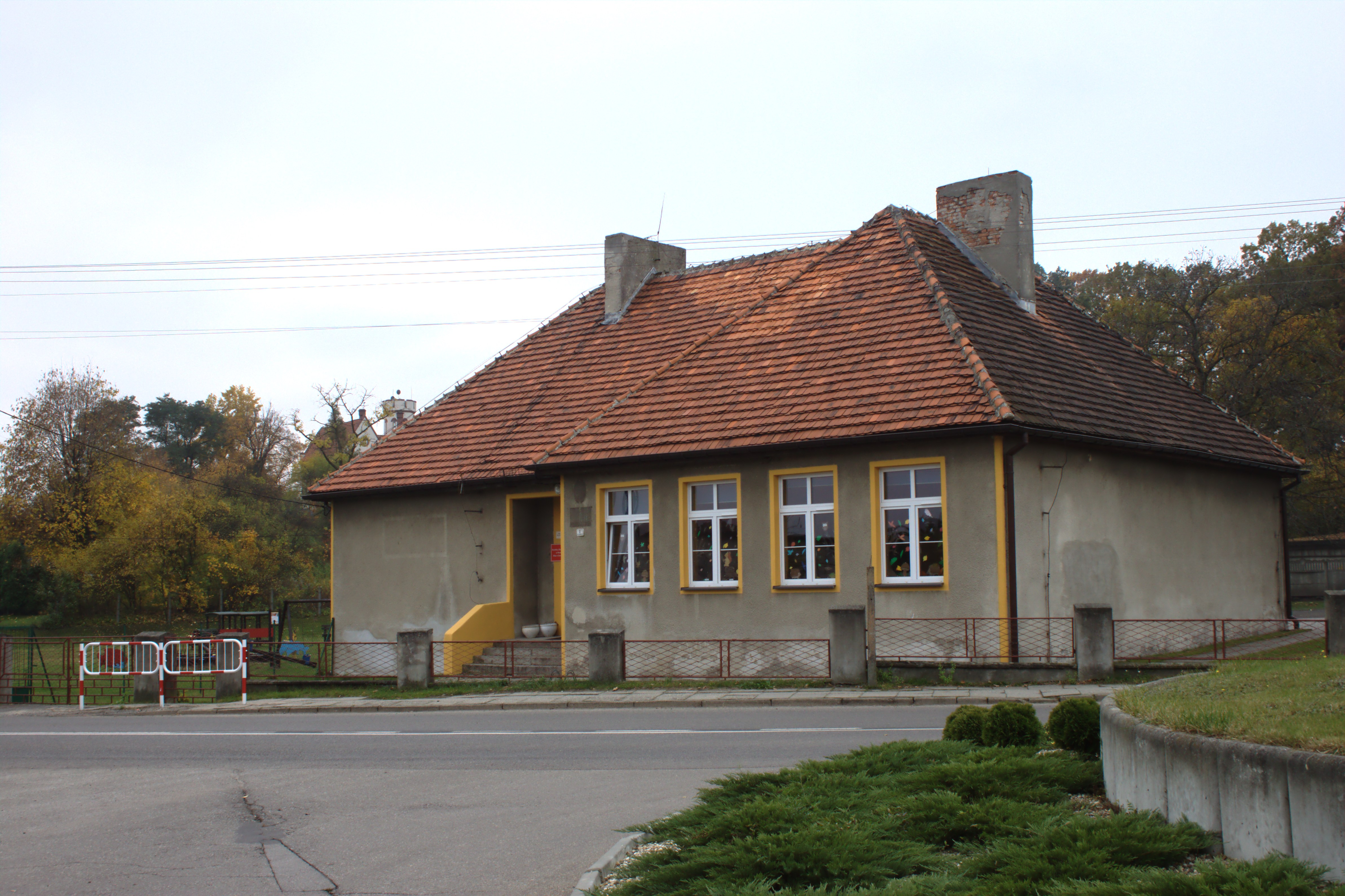
House

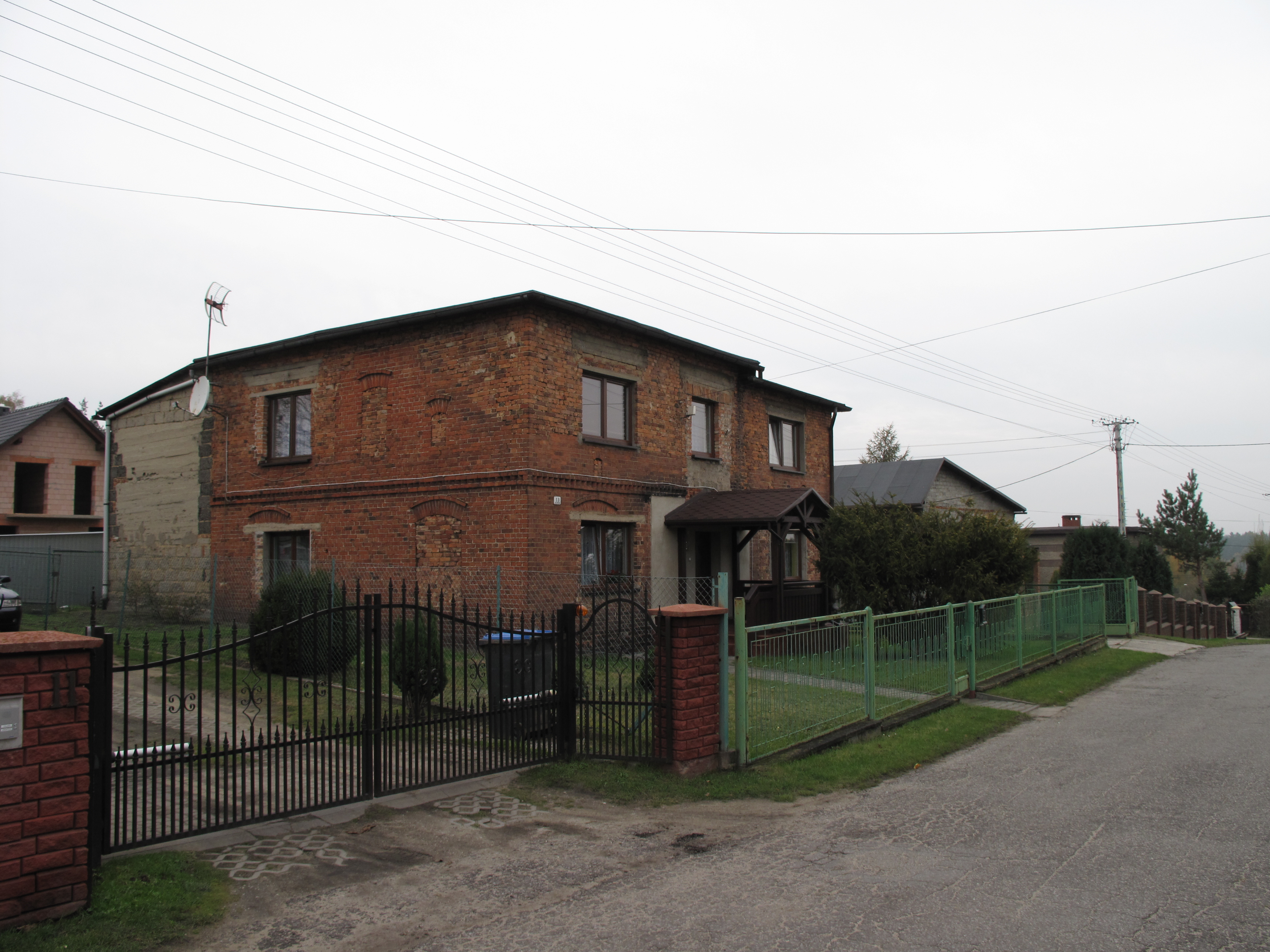
Brick house
