= 4A Games =

Ukrainian-Maltese video game developer

4A Games Limited
- Type: Subsidiary
- Industry: Video games
- Founded: 2006; 20 years ago in Kyiv, Ukraine
- Founders: Andrew Prokhorov; Oles Shyshkovtsov; Alexander Maximchuk
- Headquarters: Sliema, Malta
- Number of locations: 2 (2025)
- Key people: Dean Sharpe (CEO); Andrew Prokhorov (creative director); Oles Shyshkovtsov (CTO); Alexander Maximchuk (CIO)
- Products: Metro series
- Number of employees: 200+ (2025)
- Parent: Saber Interactive (2020–2024); Embracer Group (2024–present)
- Website: 4a-games.com.mt

4A Games Limited is a Ukrainian-Maltese video game developer based in Sliema, Malta. The company was founded in Kyiv, Ukraine, in 2006 by three developers who departed from GSC Game World. In 2014, 4A Games moved its headquarters to Sliema, wherein one Kyiv office was retained as a sub-studio, part of which split off to form an independent studio, rebranded as ‘Reburn’ in 2025, while the rest remains with 4A Games. The company is best known for developing the Metro video game series.

== History ==
=== Foundation ===
4A Games was founded by former developers from GSC Game World: Andrew Prokhorov, Oles Shyshkovtsov, and Alexander Maximchuk; they, together with Sergei Karmalsky, formed the core team of S.T.A.L.K.E.R.: Shadow of Chernobyl, which was in development at GSC in the early and mid-2000s. Prokhorov had disliked that Sergiy Grygorovych, the chief executive officer (CEO) of GSC, prioritized money over his employees, withholding royalties for games the company had produced. The situation came to a high point when the two fell out over wages in 2006, leading Prokhorov and two of the company's lead programmers—Shyshkovtsov and Maximchuk—to leave the company and found a new studio, 4A Games, with the intention to treat its employees better than Grygorovych did.

=== Metro series ===
The company's first game was Metro 2033, an adaptation of the novel of the same name by Russian author Dmitry Glukhovsky that was announced in 2009. The game was released in March 2010 on the Xbox 360 and Microsoft Windows to generally favorable reviews.

Following its initial success, 4A Games began work on the sequel, Metro: Last Light, which was announced during the 2011 Electronic Entertainment Expo convention. The game faced several issues during its production, whose release date was delayed from 2012 to 2013. The most significant setback for the company occurred in January 2013, when the game's publisher, THQ, closed down after declaring bankruptcy and auctioning off its intellectual properties. The publishing rights to the Metro 2033 franchise, including the sequel, were sold to Koch Media for $5.8 million on 22 January, allowing the company to finish making the game. Metro: Last Light was finally released on 14 May 2013, and was published by Koch Media's video game label, Deep Silver.

On 30 March 2014, a remastered re-release of both Metro titles, under the name Metro Redux, was leaked, and confirmed the day after. The compilation was released in August 2014 for eighth-generation platforms. In 2017, the company released a virtual reality game, Arktika.1.

During the 2017 E3 convention, at the Microsoft press conference on 11 June 2017, a new game, Metro Exodus, was announced for a 2018 release. Gameplay was shown to both announce the game and act as a graphical showcase for Microsoft's native 4K-focused update to the Xbox One hardware, Xbox One X. The game was released in 2019.

On 13 April 2026, 4A announced their next game, Metro 2039, with the full reveal taking place on 16 April.

=== Expansion ===
On 12 May 2014, amidst the Russo-Ukrainian war, 4A Games announced that it was to expand by opening a new studio in and moving its headquarters to Sliema, Malta to allow for easier operations inside the European Union. At the same time, the Kyiv studio became separately owned and continued to operate for Eastern European operations. It kept the 4A Games name, operating as 4A Games Ukraine until February 2025, when it was rebranded as Reburn, while the original company continued to operate as 4A Games Limited. After the release of the Metro Exodus DLCs, 4A Games Limited opened a second studio in Kyiv.

4A Games Limited was acquired by Saber Interactive under the Embracer Group for approximately US$36 million in August 2020. The publisher of the Metro series, Deep Silver, was already a part of the Embracer Group via Koch Media, making the acquisition a "sensible one" for both groups.

Prior to the Russian invasion of Ukraine in February 2022, Saber Interactive stated that all employees at 4A's Kyiv studio can relocate to other Saber-owned companies abroad if they choose to. Like other Ukrainian video game studios, it became involved in the campaign to organize funds and support for Ukraine.

In March 2024, Saber Interactive was sold to Beacon Interactive, a new company from Saber co-founder Matthew Karch. Many of the studios under Saber, including 4A Games, were not included in the sale. Embracer will retain the rights to the Metro series through its Plaion subsidiary.

=== Technology ===
Oles Shishkovtsov and Oleksandr Maksimchuk split from the development of S.T.A.L.K.E.R because of "its inherent inability to be multi-threaded, the weak and error-prone networking model, and simply awful resource and memory management which prohibited any kind of streaming or simply keeping the working set small enough for 'next-gen' consoles" along with its "terrible text-based scripting", which he explained led to the delays in the original game.

There have been accusations that the 4A Engine is a modified version of the X-Ray engine used in the S.T.A.L.K.E.R series, instead of an original development. 4A denied the accusations. Shishkovtsov also noted that porting the original engine to consoles would have proved extremely difficult.

== Games developed ==
Year	Title	Platform(s)	Publisher(s)
2010	Metro 2033	Microsoft Windows, Xbox 360	THQ
2013	Metro: Last Light	Linux, macOS, Microsoft Windows, PlayStation 3, Xbox 360	Deep Silver
2014	Metro Redux	Linux, macOS, Microsoft Windows, Nintendo Switch, PlayStation 4, Stadia, Xbox One	Deep Silver
2017	Arktika.1	Microsoft Windows	Oculus Studios
2019	Metro Exodus	Amazon Luna, Linux, macOS, Microsoft Windows, PlayStation 4, PlayStation 5, Stadia, Xbox One, Xbox Series X/S	Deep Silver
2027	Metro 2039	Microsoft Windows, PlayStation 5, Xbox Series X/S	Deep Silver
