= AST (publisher) =

Russian book publishing company

- Parent company: Eksmo (since 2012)
- Founded: 1993
- Founder: Andrey Gertsev, Sergei Derevianko and Tatiana Derevianko
- Country of origin: Russia
- Key people: Oleg Bartenev (general director)
- Official website: Official website

AST (Russian: АСТ) is one of the largest book publishing companies in Russia, headed by Oleg Bartenev (Олег Бартенев). It owns a bookstores chain "Bukva" (Russian: Буква, lit. A Letter).

Among AST partners are publishing companies Astrel, Zebra E, Molodaya Gvardiya, CenterCom, bookstores Moscow and Biblio Globus (Note: Alexander Tugolukov (Russian: Александр Туголуков; born January 1971) and his wife Yulia Tugolukov (Russian: Юлия Туголукова) opened their first office, which was only 3 square meters in Moscow on Lubyanka in 1994 in the Biblio-Globus bookstore, which was co-owned by Alexander Tugolukov's father-in-law Boris Yesenkin (Russian: Борис Есенькин). The bookstorestore gave its name to the Tugoklukov associated travel company "Biblio Globus" (BG) (Russian: «Библио Глобус» («БГ»)) which the Tugoklukov's opened after Alexander Tugolukov graduated from Higher School of the KGB (FSB) in 1994.) and online shops, such as Ozon.ru. It also owns comic book and manga publisher Comics Factory.

== History ==
The company was established in 1990 by Andrey Gertsev, Sergei Derevianko and Tatiana Derevianko as "Creative Cooperative Association AST" (Russian: Творческое кооперативное объединение «АСТ»). AST is an abbreviation meaning Andrey–Sergei–Tatiana. In 1993 the company was divided into AST itself, headed by Andrey Gertsev, and AST-PRESS.

As of 2007, AST and its rival (later parent company) Eksmo together published approximately 30% of all Russian books. In 2008 AST purchased Avanta+.

On April 19, 2012, the commercial subdivision of AST "Pyaty okean" filed for bankruptcy, as their debts exceeded 7.5 billion roubles. Eksmo stated that they had plans for AST purchase. In June 2012 Oleg Novikov, the general director of Eksmo, reported that Eksmo gained control on several subdivisions of AST, with an exception of "Bukva" bookstores chain.

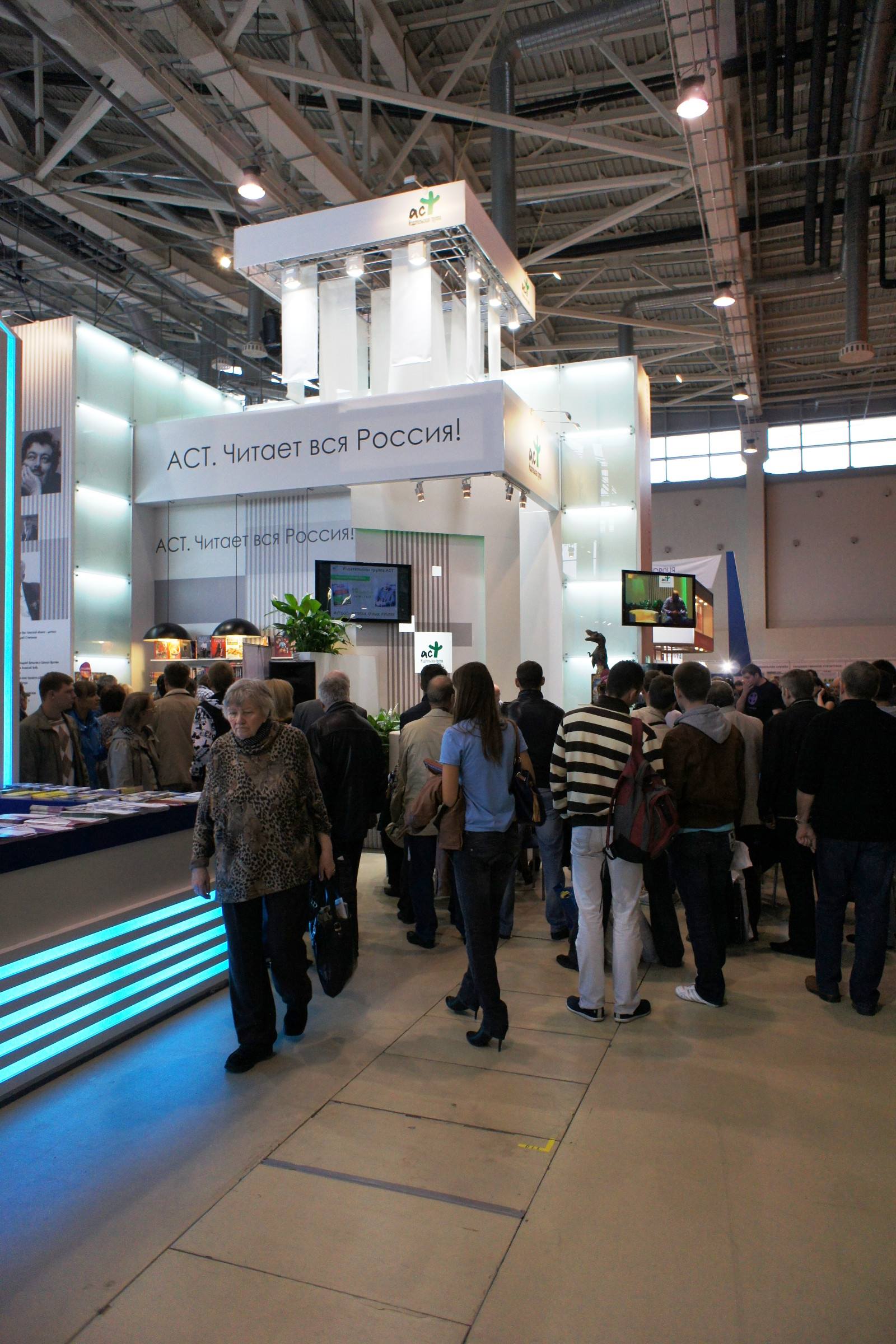
AST publishers' booth, Moscow International Book Fair 2011

== Book series ==
- Alchemy Spirit (Russian: Алхимия духа, romanized: Alkhimiya dukha
- Alternative (Russian: Альтернатива, romanized: Al'ternativa) — works of detection and fantasy
- Classics of Historical Thought (Russian: Классики исторической мысли, romanized: Klassiki istoricheskoy mysli)
- Dragon Age (Russian: Век Дракона, romanized: Vek Drakona
- Exclusive Classic (Russian: Эксклюзивная классика, romanized: Eksklyuzivnaya klassika)
- Higher Intelligence (Russian: Высший разум, romanized: Vysshiy razum
- Horror (Russian: Uzhastiki)
- The Hunger Games Trilogy (Russian: Трилогия «Голодные игры», romanized: Trilogiya "Golodnyye igry"
- Intelligent Detective (Russian: Интеллектуальный детектив, romanized: Intellektual'nyy detektiv)
- Legend of the Seeker (Russian: Легенда об Искателе, romanized: Zvozdy mirovoy filosofii
- Library of Classics (Russian: Библиотека классики, romanized: Biblioteka klassiki
- Library of World Fiction (Russian: Библиотека мировой фантастики, romanized: Biblioteka mirovoy fantastiki)
- Opening (Russian: Открытие, romanized: Otkrytiye - nonfiction books
- Revelations of Guardian Angels (Russian: Откровения ангелов-хранителей, romanized: Otkroveniya angelov-khraniteley
- Stars of World Philosophy (Russian: Звёзды мировой философии, romanized: Zvozdy mirovoy filosofii
