= Storytel =

Swedish audiobook company

Storytel AB
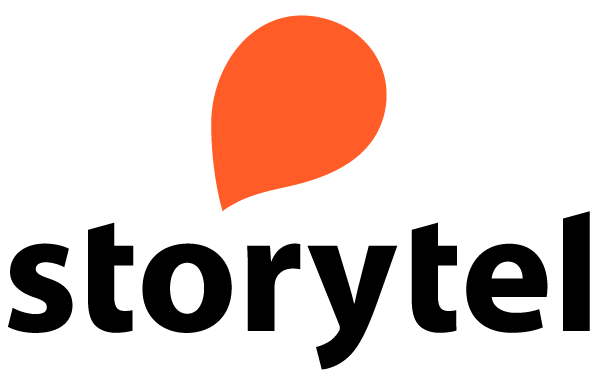
- Type: Public
- Traded as: Nasdaq Stockholm: STORY B
- Industry: Audiobooks
- Founded: 2006; 20 years ago
- Founders: Jonas Tellander; Jon Hauksson
- Headquarters: Stockholm, Sweden
- Key people: Bodil Eriksson Torp (CEO)
- Website: storytel.com audiobooks.com

Storytel AB is a Swedish e-book and audiobook subscription service based in Stockholm. It is available in more than 25 countries. Its English audiobook service Audiobooks.com is available in more than 150 countries.

== History ==
Storytel was founded in 2006 by Jonas Tellander and Jon Hauksson.

In 2016, Storytel acquired Norstedts förlag, one of Sweden's largest book publishers, and Mofibo, a Danish book service. The following year, Storytel acquired People's Press, another Danish publisher, and expanded its operations to Russia, Spain, India, and the United Arab Emirates.

In 2018, Storytel acquired Seslenen Kitaplar, a Turkish audiobook service. A year later, in 2019, it acquired Gummerus, Finland's oldest publishing house.

In July 2020, Storytel acquired a 70 percent stake in Forlagið, an Icelandic publishing house.

In November 2021, Storytel acquired Audiobooks.com from RBMedia for $135 million.

In February 2022, Jonas Tellander stepped down as the CEO for personal reasons and joined the board of directors. In August 2022, Johannes Larcher, formerly an executive at HBO, was appointed as CEO. In July 2024 it was announced that Bodil Eriksson Torp is appointed new CEO of Storytel Group.

=== Controversies ===
Storytel has been investigated for anti-competitive practices in Turkey, Iceland and other countries.
