= Semaan =

- Pronunciation: Classical Syriac: [ʃɛmʕon], Arabic: [sim.ʕaːn], Hebrew: [ʃimˈ(ʔ)on]
- Gender: Masculine

Origin
- Meaning: the one who hears or listens

Other names
- Alternative spelling: Sem'an, Semán, Simaan, Sim'an, Samaan, Sam'an, Sima'an
- Variant forms: Simon, Simeon, Shimon, Shimun

Semaan (Syriac: ܫܡܥܘܢ, romanized: Šemʿōn Arabic: سمعان, romanized: Semʻān), also spelled Sem'an, Semán, Simaan, Sim'an, Samaan, Sam'an, or Sima'an, is a masculine given name mainly found in the Levant of West Asia. It can also be used as a surname. The name is derived from the Semitic root word/verb sema or shema, which means “to hear”; thus, the meaning of Semaan becomes “the one who hears or listens” in both Syriac and Arabic.

The name's equivalent in Hebrew is Shimon or Shim'on (שִׁמְעוֹן), which also has the same meaning. The Hebrew form is also the origin for the Arabic name. The Greek transliteration is Simon (Σιμων) or Symeon (Συμεών), and when Latinized, it becomes Simon or Simeon.

Today, the overwhelming majority of people who hold the Semaan surname are Middle Eastern Christians who belong to various churches of the Syriac rites of Christianity, as well as the Greek Orthodox Church of Antioch, Syro Malabar Catholic Church, the Melkite Greek Catholic Church of Antioch, the Assyrian Church of the East, and the Coptic Orthodox Church. The ethnic origin of Semaan families varies by geographic location, most prevalent of which is Greek-Syrian, descendants of the Byzantine Greek (Rûm) population of the Syrian tetrapolis (Antioch, Seleucia Pieria, Apamea, and Laodicea).

== Origins and History of Semaan Families ==
=== Semaans of Antioch and Syria ===
The Semaans of Antioch and Syria have roots that can be traced back to the early days of Christianity, to 1st century Antioch and Damascus. As Luke the Evangelist, a native of Antioch, writes in Acts of the Apostles, "the disciples were called Christians first in Antioch" (Acts 11:26). Although the majority of Semaans of Syria is of Greek-Syrian and Syriac (Aramaean) origin and known to have come from the north of Syria (Antioch area), however, a very small minority of Ghassanid Christian Arab descent (from the 3rd century) reside in the southern part (Hauran area).

Some Semaans of Antioch claim descent from Saint Peter (Heb: Shimeon Kefa, Syr: Semaan Kefa, Grk: Symeon Kephas, Eng: Simon Peter), the preeminent disciple of Christ. The story is based on oral tradition that claims that Saint Peter, avoiding persecution in his homeland, left his family with the Hellenized Jewish community of Antioch during his seven-year stay in the city before his travel to Rome. Some others claim that they're related to Saint Simeon Stylites, a popular ascetic Syrian saint during the Byzantine Empire.

Antioch’s history of continuous falls and captures by Arabs, Seljuk Turks, Crusaders, and Mamluk Turks led to many Semaans fleeing their native city to neighboring areas in Syria and Lebanon. In 1939, Turkey annexed the Hatay province, which includes Antakya (Antioch), after Syria had control over the territory since the end of World War I.

Today, the Semaans of Syria are scattered throughout, and they live in cities such as Latakia (Laodiceia), Homs (Emesa), Aleppo, and Damascus.

=== Semaans of Lebanon ===
The Semaans of Lebanon can be broken down into four categories:

- Semaans of South Lebanon are a mix of Galilean Christians of Israel from the 1st century (Marjayoun area) as well as Greek-Phoenician (Canaanite) Christians of the 2nd century (Sidon area). Many Semaan families have immigrated to Western nations and South America.
- Semaans of East Lebanon (Bekaa Valley) are part of the Greek-Syrian Semaans of Antioch and Syria (1st century Antioch) who escaped religious persecution in Syria, especially during the Ottoman Empire and the repercussions of the 18th century split of the Melkite Greek Catholics from the Greek Orthodox Church of Antioch. They now live in the Bekaa region (Zahlé area), Beirut, Mount Lebanon, and around the world.
- Semaans of Byblos are of Greek-Phoenician (Canaanite) origin of the 1st century.
- Semaans of North Lebanon (Kaftoun, Koura) are of Ghassanid Christian Arab heritage settling first in the southern part of Syria (3rd century) before taking refuge in the mountains of Lebanon (7-8th century).

=== Semaans of Israel/Palestine ===
The Semaans of Israel/Palestine can be broken down geographically as follows:

- Semaans of Beit Lahem (Bethlehem) are early Galilean Christians from the 1st century who, at one point in time, lived in the villages of Galilee, before settling in Bethlehem in the 9th century. There are very few left in Bethlehem today, as most have emigrated, mainly to Venezuela and Honduras.
- Simaans of Haifa, Akko (Acre), Nazareth, and the rest of Galilee are mostly Galilean Christians from the 1st century. The majority has immigrated to Lebanon, Australia, and the United States.
- Semaans of Urashalim (Jerusalem) are mainly descendants of 1st century Galilean Christians who belong to the Syriac Orthodox Church of Jerusalem. Only a few remain as the majority has immigrated to the United States and Canada or moved to Jordan.

=== Semaans of Iraq ===
The Semaans of Iraq (Mesopotamia) are mainly Assyrians from Mosul and Tel Keppe, in the north of Iraq, who can trace their ancestry back to the 2nd century. Today, most Semaans of Mosul and Iraq have left, especially after the American-led 2003 invasion of Iraq and the ensuing anti-Christian backlash, to places such as Lebanon, Sweden, and the United States.

=== Semaans of Egypt ===
The Semaans of Egypt are Copts and Greek-Egyptian Christians from Alexandria, Aswan, and Cairo. Some can trace their ancestry to 1st century Alexandria, and the establishment of Christianity there by Saint Mark. Today, many Semaans have also immigrated to Western countries.

== Notable people ==
=== Surname ===
- Alees Samaan, Bahraini politician and ambassador
- Alice Semaan, first Christian female parliamentarian in Bahrain
- Angele Botros Samaan (1923–2011), Egyptian academic and translator
- Anthony Semaan, co-founder of Beirut Jam Sessions
- Arkan Simaan (born 1945), Lebanese-French novelist
- Céline Semaan Vernon (born 1982), Lebanese fashion designer
- Mollie Marcoux Samaan, American athletics administrator
- Myrna T. Semaan (born 1968), Lebanese botanist
- Nathanael Semaan (born 1965), Iraqi Syriac Catholic archbishop
- Yaacoub Semaan (born 1980), Lebanese-born Syriac Catholic bishop in Jerusalem
- Youhannan Semaan Issayi, Archbishop of Tehran of the Chaldean Catholics

=== Given name ===
- Semaan Bassil (born 1965), Lebanese banker
- Simaan AbouRizk, Canadian engineer

== See also ==
- Simon
- Simon Peter (Semaan Boutros)
- Simon the Zealot (Semaan l-Ghayour)
- Simeon the Elder (Semaan l-Shaykh)
- Simeon of Jerusalem (Semaan l-Urashalimi)
- Simon of Cyrene (Semaan l-Qayrawani)
- Simon Magus (Semaan l-Saḥer)
- Simeon Stylites (Semaan l-Aamoudi)
- Simeon Stylites the Younger (Semaan l-Aamoudi l-Asghar)
- Simeon Stylites III (Semaan l-Aamoudi l-Thalith)
- Simeon the Holy Fool (Semaan l-Majnoun)
- Simon the Tanner (Semaan l-Dabbagh)
- Simeon Seth (Semaan Sheyth)
- Assemani (As-Semaani), a prominent "Simeonite" family of Lebanese Maronites from the 18th century, publishers at the Vatican Library
- Jabal Semaan, Syria, Mount Simeon district in northern Syria, home to Eastern Mediterranean's most populous city, Aleppo
- Deir Semaan, St. Simeon's monastery, one of the world's oldest churches and the oldest surviving Byzantine church
