= Simon (given name) =

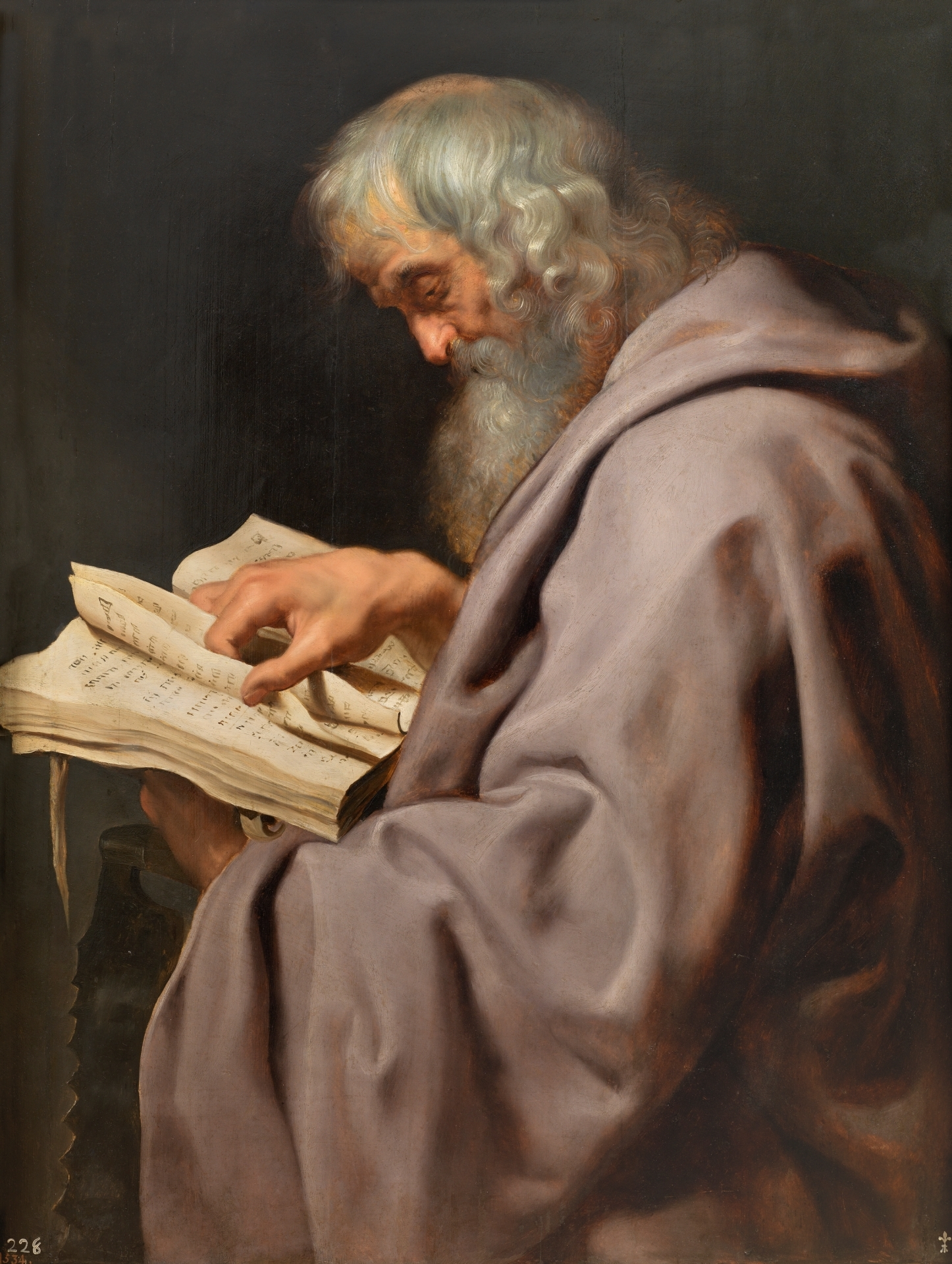
- St. Simon the Zealot
- Gender: Male
- Name day: January 5 (Hungary); May 9 (Eastern Orthodoxy); October 28 (France, Germany, Sweden, Italy, Spain)

Origin
- Origin: The Bible
- Meaning: "listen"

Simon is a given name, from Hebrew שִׁמְעוֹן Šimʻôn, meaning "listen" or "hearing". It is also a classical Greek name, deriving from an adjective meaning "flat-nosed". In the first century AD, Simon was the most popular male name for Jews in Roman Judea.

The Hebrew name is Hellenised as Symeon (Ancient Greek: Συμεών) in the Septuagint, and in the New Testament as both Symeon and, according to most authorities, Simon. Simon is one Latinised version of the name, the others being Symeon or Simeon.

== In other languages ==
- Ancient Greek: Σίμων (Simon). This name appears in Greek mythology as one of the Telchines. In Greek means "flat-nosed". Συμεών is the Hellenization of the name found in the Septuagint and parts of the New Testament, this form continues in use through the mediaeval era, viz. Symeon the New Theologian.
- Albanian: Simon, Simeon
- Amharic: ስምዖን, Smeon
- Arabic: سِمْعَان (Simʻān), شَمْعُون (Šamʻūn)
- Old Aramaic: Šimʻōn (Shim'on)
- Aramaic (middle and modern): ܫܡܥܘܢ (Šëmʻūn, Shem'un or Sëmʻān, Semaan)
- Aragonese: Simón
- Armenian: Սիմոն
- Azerbaijani: Şımon
- Basque: Simon or, sometimes, Ximun
- Belarusian: Сымон (Symon), Сямён (Sjamyon)
- Bengali: সাইমন (Saimon), শিমন (Šimon), সিমন (Simon)
- Breton: Simon
- Bulgarian: Симеон (Simeon)
- Catalan: Simó
- Chinese: 西蒙 (Xīméng), 西門 (Xīmén), 賽門 (Sàimén). 西蒙 (Xīméng) is usually used to refer to Σίμων (Simon) of Ancient Greek origin, while 西門 (Xīmén) usually refers to Συμεών (Symeon) of Hebrew origin. 西門 (Xīmén) is also a purely Chinese surname and has nothing to do with Σίμων (Simon) or Συμεών (Symeon).
- Croatian: Šimun
- Czech: Šimon
- Danish: Simon
- Dutch: Simon, Simeon, Siem
- English: Simon
- Esperanto: Simono
- Estonian: Siimon, Siim, Simon, Siimeon
- Faroese: Símun, Símin, Simona, Mona
- Finnish: Simo, Simon, Simeoni
- French: Simon
- Galician: Simón
- Georgian: სჳმეონ (Swimeon), სჳმონ (Swimon), სიმონ (Simon)
- German: Simon
- Greek: Συμεών (Simeón), Σύμος (Símos)
- Gujarati: સિમોન (Simōna)
- Hebrew: שמעון (Šimʻōn, Shimeon, Shimon)
- Hindi: साइमन (Sā'imana)
- Hmong: Ximoos
- Hungarian: Semjén, Simon
- Icelandic: Símon
- Indonesian: Simon
- Irish: Síomón
- Italian: Simone
- Japanese: サイモン (Saimon), シメオン（Simeon), シモン (Shimon)
- Kannada: ಸೈಮನ್ (Saiman)
- Korean: 시몬 (Simon)
- Latin: Simeonus, Simonis, Symeon
- Latvian: Sīmanis, Sīmans, Simons, Saimons
- Lithuanian: Simonas, Šimonas
- Macedonian: Симон (Simon), Симеон (Simeon)
- Malayalam: ശിമയോൻ (Shimayon), സൈമൺ (Simon), ചുമ്മാർ (Chummar)
- Maltese: Xmun
- Māori: Haimona
- Marathi: सायमन (Sāyman)
- Mongolian: Симон (Simon)
- Nepali: सिमोन (Simōna)
- Norwegian: Simon, Simen
- Occitan: Simon
- Persian: سامان (Saman)
- Polish: Szymon
- Portuguese: Simão
- Prekmurje Slovene: Šimon
- Punjabi: ਸ਼ਮਊਨ (Śama'ūna)
- Quechua: Simun
- Romanian: Simion
- Russian: Семён (Semyon), Симон (Simon)
- Scottish Gaelic: Sim
- Serbian: Симон (Simon), Симеон (Simeon), Симеун (Simeun), Симо (Simo)
- Slovak: Simon, Šimon
- Slovene: Simon
- Spanish: Simón, Jimeno
- Swahili: Simoni
- Swedish: Simon
- Classical Syriac: ܫܡܥܘܢ (Shemon, pronounced [ʃɛmʕon])
- Tamil: சைமன் (Caimaṉ)
- Telugu: సీమెాను (Simonu)
- Thai: ไซมอน (Sai mon)
- Tigrinya: ስምኦን (Simi'on)
- Turkish: Simun, Simon, Şimon
- Ukrainian: Семен (Semen), Симон (Symon)
- Urdu: سائمن
- Vietnamese: Sỹ Minh, Xi Mông
- Welsh: Simwnt, Seimon
- Yiddish: שמעון

== Notable people with the given name Simon or Simón ==
For a comprehensive list see.

=== Ancient ===
- Simon the Shoemaker (5th century BCE), friend of Socrates
- Simon Thassi (r. 141–135 BCE), high priest of Jerusalem and ruler of Judaea
- Simon of Peraea (died 4 BCE), Jewish rebel mentioned by Josephus
- Simon the Zealot, apostle of Jesus
- Simon bar Giora, (died 70 CE), Judean leader in the First Jewish-Roman War
- Simon bar Kokhba, Jewish rebel leader
- Simon bar Yochai, rabbi
- Simon of Bet-Parsaje (died 339), Christian martyred with Mana of Bet-Parsaje
- Simon of Bet-Titta (died 447), Christian martyr

=== Medieval ===
- Simeon I of Bulgaria (died 927), tsar of the First Bulgarian Empire
- Simon the Tanner (10th century), Coptic saint
- Simon of Kalocsa (fl. 1108–1142), Hungarian prelate
- Simon (bishop of Transylvania) (fl. 1111–1113), Hungarian prelate
- Simon of Worcester (died 1150), English Bishop of Worcester
- Simon de Montfort, 6th Earl of Leicester (1208–1265) Leader of the barons against Henry III
- Simon Kacsics (fl. 1212–1228), Hungarian lord
- Simon Kacsics, Count of the Székelys (fl. 1291–1327), Hungarian lord
- Simon of Southwell, canon lawyer and Treasurer of Lichfield Cathedral
- Simon Sudbury (died 1381) English Archbishop and Lord Chancellor
- Simon, Metropolitan of Moscow (died 1512), Russian Orthodox leader

=== Renaissance to modern ===
- Simon Abeywickrema (1903–1948), Sri Lankan politician
- Simon Abkarian (born 1962), French actor
- Simon Adingra (born 2002), Ivorian footballer
- Simon Adjei (born 1993), Swedish footballer
- Simon Pardiñas López (born 1987), Spanish dentist
- Simon Ammann (born 1981), Swiss ski jumper
- Simon Amstell (born 1979), English television presenter
- Simon Armitage (born 1963), English poet, playwright and novelist who was appointed Poet Laureate in May 2019
- Simon Appiah Asamoah (born 2002), Ghanaian footballer
- Simon Arora (born 1969), British billionaire businessman
- Simon Aspelin (born 1974), Swedish tennis player
- Simon Baker (born 1969), Australian actor and director
- Simon Barere (1896–1951), Russian-born American pianist
- Simon Baron-Cohen (born 1958), British autism researcher
- Simon Baynes, British politician
- Simon Beckett (born 1960), British journalist and author
- Simon Bengtsson (born 2004), Swedish footballer
- Simon Bening (1483–1561), Flemish miniaturist
- Simon van den Bergh (1819–1907), Dutch margarine manufacturer, founder of Unilever
- Simón Bolívar (1783–1830), Latin American military and political leader
- Simon Bolivar Buckner (1823–1914), American soldier and Governor of Kentucky
- Simon Callow (born 1949), British actor
- Simon Cameron (1799–1889), American politician and Secretary of War
- Simon Carmiggelt (1913–1987), Dutch poet, columnist and satirist
- Simon Chang (designer) (born 1947), Chinese-Canadian fashion designer
- Simon Chang (politician) (Chang San-cheng; born 1954), Premier of the Republic of China
- Simon Charbonneau (born 1988), Canadian racing driver
- Simon Charbonneau-Campeau (born 1988), Canadian football player
- Simon J. Clark, British protein biochemist
- Simon Conway Morris (born 1951), English palaeontologist
- Simon Coveney (born 1972), Irish government minister
- Simon Cowell (born 1959), British television personality
- Simon Dach (1605–1659), Prussian lyrical poet
- Simon Dallow, New Zealand television journalist
- Simon Davies (disambiguation), several people
- Simon Dobler (born 2006), German trampoline gymnast
- Simon Donaldson (born 1957), English mathematician
- Simon Dring (1945–2021), British journalist and television presenter
- Simon During (born 1950), New Zealand-Australian academic
- Simon Episcopius (1583–1643), Dutch theologian and Remonstrant
- Simon Fairweather (born 1969), Australian archer
- Simon Farine (born 1987), Canadian basketball player
- Simon Fernando Sri Chandrasekera (1829–1908), Sri Lankan Sinhala businessman
- Simon Fernholm (born 1994), Swedish ice hockey player
- Simon Fisher-Becker (1961–2025), British stage, television and film actor
- Simon Gagné (born 1980), Canadian ice hockey player
- Simon Gallup (born 1960), bassist in English rock band The Cure
- Simon Harris (born 1986), Irish Fine Gael politician, Taoiseach and leader of Fine Gael since 2024
- Simon Harris (musician) (born 1962), British music producer
- Simon Helberg (born 1980), American actor, comedian, and musician
- Simon Heslop (born 1987), English footballer
- Simon Horobin
- Simon Jackson, British playwright, filmmaker and poet
- Simon Jolin-Barrette, Canadian lawyer and politician from Quebec
- Simon Joyner (born 1971), American singer-songwriter
- Simon Karam (born 1950), Lebanese lawyer and diplomat
- Simon Katich (born 1976), Australian test cricketer
- Simon Kaukhchishvili
- Simon Keenlyside (born 1959), British baritone
- Simon Kidane (born 1975), Ethiopian basketball player
- Simon Kuper (born 1969), British author
- Simon Lane (born 1978), British comedian and YouTuber
- Simon Lansmann (born 1982), German politician
- Simon Le Bon (born 1958), lead singer of English band Duran Duran
- Simon Lindholm (born 2001), Finnish footballer
- Simon Lundström
- Simon MacCorkindale, British actor
- Simon Madden (born 1957), Australian footballer
- Simon Magalashvili (born 1968), Israeli Olympic judoka
- Simon Maljevac (born 1981), Slovenian politician
- Simon Mann (1952–2025), British Army officer and convicted mercenary
- Simon Marcus (1986), Canadian kickboxer
- Simon van der Meer (1925–2011), Dutch particle physicist and Nobel Laureate
- Simon Mignolet (born 1988), Belgian football player
- Simon Miller, wrestling journalist for WhatCulture and professional wrestler
- Simon Moabi, Motswana MP
- Simon Monjack (1970–2010), British filmmaker
- Simon Neil (born 1979), Scottish guitarist and lead singer of Biffy Clyro
- Simon Nkoli (1957–1998), South African activist
- Simon Oakland (1928–1983), American actor
- Simon Okker (1881–1944), Dutch Olympic fencer killed in Auschwitz
- Simon Parkin, English journalist and writer
- Simon Pegg (born 1970), English writer and actor
- Simon Poulsen (born 1984), Danish footballer
- Simon Pryce (born 1972), Australian children's lead singer of The Wiggles
- Simon Rex (born 1974), American actor and rapper
- Simon H. Rifkind (1901–1995), American lawyer and judge
- Simon Rosenbaum (baseball) (born 1993), American-Israeli baseball player with Team Israel
- Simon Schama (born 1945), English historian specializing in art, Dutch, and French history
- Simon Sears (born 1984), Danish actor
- Simon Shirley (born 1966), Australian decathlete
- Simon Shnapir (born 1987), American Olympic medalist pair skater
- Simon Singer (born 1941), American world champion American handball player, and radio and television actor
- Simon Sjödin (born 1986), Swedish swimmer
- Simon Skrabb (born 1995), Finnish footballer
- Simon Steel (born 1969), English cricketer
- Simon van der Stel (1639–1712), Dutch Governor of the Cape Colony
- Simon Stepaniak (born 1997), American football player
- Simon Stevin (1548–1620), Netherlandish mathematician, physicist and engineer
- Simon Tahamata (born 1956), Dutch and Belgian footballer
- Simon Terry (1974–2021), British archer
- Simon Townsend (1945–2025), Australian children's show host and producer
- Simon Tong (born 1972), English guitarist and keyboardist formerly of The Verve
- Simon Trpčeski (born 1979), Macedonian pianist
- Simon Vestdijk (1898–1971), Dutch novelist and poet
- Simon Vukčević (born 1986), Montenegrin footballer
- Simon de Vlieger (1601–1653), Dutch designer, draughtsman, and marine painter
- Simon Vroemen (born 1969), Dutch steeplechase runner
- Simon Webbe (born 1978), English singer and rapper from Blue
- Simon Weston (born 1961), British soldier who suffered severe burn injuries during the Falklands War
- Simon Wiesenthal (1908–2005), Austrian Holocaust survivor and Nazi hunter
- Simon Yam (born 1955), Hong Kong actor/director
- Simeon II of Bulgaria (born 1937), tsar of the Kingdom of Bulgaria

=== Biblical characters ===
- Simeon (Hebrew Bible), second son of Jacob and Leah
- Simon Maccabaeus (died 135 BCE), brother of Judas Maccabeus and ruler of Judea
- Simon Peter, better known as Saint Peter, one of the Twelve Apostles
- Simon the Zealot (also called Simon the Canaanite), another of the Twelve Apostles
- Simon the Leper, resident of Bethany visited by Jesus
- Simon the Tanner (New Testament), resident of Joppa with whom Peter stayed on the way to Caesarea to see Cornelius
- Simon of Cyrene, man forced to carry Jesus' cross
- Simon Magus, magician confronted by Saint Peter and namesake of the term "simony"
- Simon (brother of Jesus)

=== Fictional characters ===
- Simon Adebisi, a sadistic Nigerian inmate in the HBO drama Oz
- Simon Bar Sinister, main antagonist in the television cartoon Underdog
- Simon Belmont, one of the main characters of the video game series Castlevania
- Simon Blackquill, a character in the video game Phoenix Wright: Ace Attorney – Dual Destinies
- Simon Boccanegra, pirate in a Verdi opera by the same name
- Simon Camden, one of the main characters of television drama 7th Heaven
- Simon Cooper, one of the main characters in the British television series The Inbetweeners
- Simon Grace, one of the main characters of The Spiderwick Chronicles, by Tony DiTerlizzi and Holly Black
- Simon Seville, a character from Alvin and the Chipmunks
- Simon Henriksson, the main protagonist of Cry of Fear
- Simon Lasker (Pyro), a Marvel Comics character and member of the X-Men
- Simon Legree, the antagonist of Uncle Tom's Cabin
- Simon Lewis, one of the protagonists in The Mortal Instruments series by Cassandra Clare
- Simon Petrikov, known as the ice king a character from Adventure time
- Sir Simon McDuck, a Disney character who is an ancestor of Scrooge McDuck and Donald Duck
- Simon "Ghost" Riley, a playable character appearing in several games from the Call of Duty video game franchise, and the subject of a series of graphic novels
- Simon Tam, character from the television series Firefly
- Simon Templar, main character of Leslie Charteris' The Saint novels
- Simon (Gurren Lagann), protagonist of the anime series Tengen Toppa Gurren Lagann
- Simon (Lord of the Flies), character in Lord of the Flies, by William Golding
- Simon (Trollz), main villain in the television series Trollz
- Simon, a character from the television series The Walking Dead, played by Steven Ogg
- Simple Simon, a character from the traditional nursery rhyme
- Simon the Sorcerer, the main protagonist in the video game series Simon the Sorcerer

== See also ==
- Simon (surname)
- Simon (disambiguation)
- Symon
- Sīmanis
- Simpson
