= Simeon (disambiguation) =

Simeon is a given name of East Slavic origin. It is a version of the name Simon.

Simeon may also refer to:

== Buildings ==
- A.J. Simeon Stadium, multi-use stadium in High Point, North Carolina, United States
- Simeon B. Robbins House, historic home located at Franklinville in Cattaraugus County, New York, United States
- Simeon Moore House, historic house and farmstead located along Cane Run on Taylorsville Road, near Fisherville, Kentucky, United States
- Simeon P. Smith House, historic house in Portsmouth, New Hampshire, United States
- Simeon Rockefeller House, historic house located in Germantown, New York, United States
- Simeon Sage House, historic home located at Scottsville in Monroe County, New York, United States

== Geography ==
- Mount Simeon, highland region in Aleppo Governorate in Syria
- Mount Simeon District, district (mantiqa) of the Aleppo Governorate in Syria
- Simeon, Nebraska, unincorporated community in Cherry County, Nebraska, United States
- Simeon, Virginia, unincorporated community in Albemarle County, Virginia, United States
- Simeon Peak, mountain in the South Shetland Islands, Antarctica

== Other ==
- A Song for Simeon, poem by American-English poet T. S. Eliot
- Simeon (email client), former IMAP4 email client
- Simeon Career Academy, vocational high school in Chicago, Illinois
- Siméon (film), a French film

== See also ==
- Saint Simeon (disambiguation)
- San Simeon (disambiguation)
- Simeon (surname)
