= Simeon Stylites (disambiguation) =

Simeon Stylites was a Christian ascetic saint who achieved fame for living 37 years on a small platform on top of a pillar near Aleppo in Syria.

Simeon Stylites may also refer to:

- Simeon Stylites the Younger (521–597), Syrian pillar hermit
- Simeon Stylites III (5th century), Syrian pillar hermit
- Simeon Stylites of Lesbos (765/766–844), Byzantine pillar hermit and iconodule
- Simeon Stylites, pen name of Halford E. Luccock (1885–1960) while writing for The Christian Century
