= Siim =

Male given name and family name

- Gender: Male
- Name day: 28 October

Origin
- Origin: from the Hellenized version of the name Simeon (in Greek: Συμεων; in Hebrew: שמעון )
- Region of origin: Estonia

Other names
- Related names: Siimo, Siimon, Siimu, Simmo, Simmu, Simun, Siimeon

Siim is both an Estonian masculine given name and less commonly, a surname. It is sometimes a diminutive of the given names Siimon and Siimeon, cognates of the given names Simon and Simeon.

Individuals bearing the name Siim include:

Given name

- Siim Avi (born 1984), Estonian politician and lawyer
- Siim Kabrits (born 1979), Estonian politician
- Siim Kallas (1948–2026), Estonian politician
- Siim-Valmar Kiisler (born 1965), Estonian politician
- Siim Kiskonen (born 1997), Estonian cyclist
- Siim Liivik (born 1988), Estonian-Finnish ice hockey player
- Siim Luts (born 1989), Estonian professional footballer
- Siim Pohlak (born 1985), Estonian businessman and politician
- Siim-Markus Post (born 1997), Estonian basketball player
- Siim Rast (born 1988), Estonian powerlifter
- Siim Roops (born 1986), Estonian professional footballer
- Siim-Tanel Sammelselg (born 1993), Estonian ski-jumper
- Siim Sellis (born 1987), Estonian cross-country skier
- Siim Sukles (born 1972), Estonian sport figure
- Siim Tenno (born 1990), Estonian football midfielder
- Siim Troost (born 1999), Estonian tennis player
- Siim-Sander Vene (born 1990), Estonian professional basketballer

Surname

Andres Siim (born 1962), Estonian architect
