= Chamoun =

- Pronunciation: Classical Syriac: [ʃɛmʕon], Arabic: [/ʃam.ʕuːn/]
- Gender: Masculine

Origin
- Origin: Classical Syriac: ܫܡܥܘܢ (Chamoun); Arabic: شمعون (Chamoun)

Other names
- Alternative spelling: Shamoun, Chamun

Chamoun, Chamun or Shamoun (Syriac: ܫܡܥܘܢ; Arabic: شمعون), is a masculine given and family name of Classical Syriac and Arabic origin. It is mainly a variant of the biblical name Simeon, Symeon, or Shimon, which is derived from Hebrew.

The name may also be alternatively used as Shimun, which is mostly predominant amongst Assyrian Christians who follow churches of the East Syriac rite.

== Surname ==
Notable persons with Chamoun or its variants as a surname include:

=== Chamoun family ===
The Chamoun family is a Lebanese Maronite political family, who have held positions in the government of Lebanon since the presidency of Camille Chamoun. Members of this family include:

- Camille Chamoun (1900–1987), Lebanese politician, President of Lebanon from 1952 to 1958
- Camille Dory Chamoun (born 1957), Lebanese politician, son of Dory Chamoun
- Dany Chamoun (1934–1990), Lebanese politician, son of Camille Chamoun
- Dory Chamoun (born 1931), Lebanese politician, son of Camille Chamoun
- Tracy Chamoun (born 1962), Lebanese-Australian author and political activist, daughter of Dany Chamoun

=== Chamoun ===
- Chaouki Chamoun (born 1942), Lebanese artist
- Jackie Chamoun (born 1991), Lebanese alpine skier
- Malek Chamoun (born 1989), Australian weightlifter
- Nicole Chamoun (born 1984), Lebanese-Australian actress
- Sami Chamoun (born 1975), Australian-born rugby league player representing Lebanon
- Sarah Joe Chamoun (born 1993), Lebanese pornographic actress and media personality better known as Mia Khalifa
- Takla Chamoun (born 1966), Lebanese actress

=== Shamoun ===
- Arkan Najeeb Shamoun (born 1982), Iraqi former football player
- Fuat Shamoun Oduncu (born 1970), German-Assyrian oncologist
- Noah Shamoun (born 2002), Swedish-Assyrian football player

== Given name ==
Notable persons with Chamoun or its variants as a given name include:

- Shamoun Hanna Haydo (before 1914–1963), Assyrian military leader

== See also ==
- Shimun (disambiguation), also Shemon
- Simon (disambiguation), also Symeon
- Shimon (disambiguation), also Shim'on
