= Shimun =

- Pronunciation: Classical Syriac: [ʃɛmʕon]
- Gender: Masculine

Origin
- Origin: Classical Syriac: ܫܡܥܘܢ (Shimun)

Other names
- Alternative spelling: Shamoun, Chamun, Chamoun

Shimun (Syriac alphabet: ܫܡܥܘܢ), also transliterated as Shemʿon or Shimon is the form of Simon used in Classical Syriac and dialects of Neo-Aramaic. It is a masculine given name, and is mainly a variant of the biblical name Simeon, Symeon, or Shimon, which is derived from Hebrew. The name may also be alternatively used as Chamoun.

== Mar Shimun ==
Mar Shimun may refer to any of the following Patriarchs of the Church of the East or Patriarchs of the Chaldean Catholic Patriarchs of Babylon:

- Shemʿon bar Sabbaʿe, (329-341), Catholicos-Patriarch of the Church of the East
- Shemon II (1365–1392), Patriarch of the Church of the East
- Shemon III (1403–1407), Patriarch of the Church of the East
- Shemon IV (1437–1497), Patriarch of the Church of the East
- Shemon V (1497–1501), Patriarch of the Church of the East
- Shemon VI (1503–1538), Patriarch of the Church of the East
- Shemʿon VII (1538–1551), Patriarch of the Church of the East
- Shemʿon VII Ishoʿyahb, (1539–1558) Patriarch of the Church of the East
- Shemʿon VIII (1553–1555), Patriarch of the Chaldean Catholic Church
- Shimun IX Dinkha (1580–1600), Patriarch of the Chaldean Catholic Church
- Shimun X Eliyah (1600–1638), Patriarch of the Chaldean Catholic Church
- Shimun XI Eshuyow (1638–1656), Patriarch of the Chaldean Catholic Church
- Shimun XII Yoalaha (1656–1662), Patriarch of the Chaldean Catholic Church
- Shimun XIII Dinkha (1662–1692), Patriarch of the Chaldean Catholic Church and after breaking the Communion with Rome in 1692, Patriarch of the Assyrian Church of the East until 1700
- Shimun XIV Shlemon (1700–1740), Patriarch of the Assyrian Church of the East
- Shimun XV Maqdassi Mikhail (1740–1780), Patriarch of the Assyrian Church of the East
- Shimun XVI Yohannan (1780–1820), Patriarch of the Assyrian Church of the East
- Shimun XVII Abraham (1820–1860), Patriarch of the Assyrian Church of the East
- Shimun XVIII Rubil (1860–1903), Patriarch of the Assyrian Church of the East
- Shimun XIX Benyamin (1903–1918), Patriarch of the Assyrian Church of the East
- Shimun XX Paulos (1918–1920), Patriarch of the Assyrian Church of the East
- Shimun XXI Eshai (1920–1975) (assassinated), Patriarch of the Assyrian Church of the East

== Other notable peoples ==
- Dawid Mar Shimun (1889-1974), Assyrian military leader
- Shemʿon of Rev Ardashir, Persian priest and jurist in the Church of the East
- Shimun Vrochek (b. 1976), Russian sci-fi author
- Surma D'Bait Mar Shimun (1883-1975), sister of Mar Shimun XIX Benyamin

== See also ==
- List of patriarchs of the Church of the East
- List of Chaldean Catholic patriarchs of Babylon
- Mar Shimun (disambiguation)
- Chamoun
- Simon (disambiguation), also Symeon
- Simeon
- Shimon (disambiguation), also Shim'on
