= Oduncu =

Oduncu (IPA: [odunˈdʒu], literally "woodcutter", "timberman") is a Turkish occupational surname and may refer to:

- Fuat Oduncu (born 1970), German hematologist
- Mehmet Oduncu (born 1962), Turkish civil servant
- Velican Oduncu (1963–1988), Turkish Grey Wolves member and murder victim
