= Saint Simeon =

Saint Simeon, Saint Symeon or Saint-Siméon may refer to:

== People ==
- Simeon, a name Simon Peter calls himself in 2 Peter 1:1. New Testament saint; first of the Apostles, first bishop of Antioch and Rome, martyr
- Simeon (Gospel of Luke), the Jerusalemite who first recognised the infant Jesus as "the Lord's Christ" (Luke 2:25-32)
- Simeon Bachos, traditional name of the Ethiopian eunuch who appears in Acts 8 of the New Testament
- Simeon of Jerusalem (fl. 70–107 AD), 1st–2nd century saint, martyr, and second bishop of Jerusalem
- Simeon, Archbishop of Seleucia and Ctesiphon (died 345), 4th-century Christian martyr
- Simeon Stylites, the Elder (390–459), 5th century Christian ascetic saint who lived for 37 years atop a pillar
- Simeon Stylites the Younger (521–596), 6th century Christian ascetic saint, stylite and hieromonk
- Simeon the Holy Fool, 6th-century saint from Syria
- Simeon of the Olives, (624/5–734), Syriac monk, bishop of Harran, and Syriac Orthodox saint
- Symeon the Metaphrast (died c. 1000), Byzantine historian, hagiographer, and saint
- Symeon the Studite (918–986 or 987), Byzantine monk and spiritual father of St. Simeon the New Theologian
- Symeon the New Theologian (949–1022), Byzantine monk and poet; third of the three Holy Hierarchs
- Symeon of Trier (died Germany 1035), Sicilian monk, recluse, and saint
- Stefan Nemanja (1113–1199), Eastern Orthodox saint canonised under the name Simeon the Myrrh-streaming
- Symeon of Thessalonica (c. 1381–1429), Eastern Orthodox saint

== Places ==
=== France ===
- Saint-Siméon, Eure, in the Eure département
- Saint-Siméon, Orne, in the Orne département
- Saint-Siméon, Seine-et-Marne, in the Seine-et-Marne département
- Saint-Siméon-de-Bressieux, in the Isère département

=== Turkey ===
- Port Saint Symeon, also known as Saint Symeon, the medieval port of Antioch

=== Canada ===
- Saint-Siméon, Gaspésie, Quebec
- Saint-Siméon, Capitale-Nationale, Quebec

=== Israel ===
- San Symeon, A known monastery In Jerusalem.

=== United States, California ===
- San Simeon

== See also ==
- Saint Simon (disambiguation)
- Simeon (disambiguation)
