= Simeon (surname) =

Simeon is a surname. Notable people with the surname include:

- Albert T. W. Simeons (1900–1970), leading exponent of a weight-loss protocol based on human chorionic gonadotropin (hCG)
- Arthur Simeon (born 1983), stand-up comedian based in Toronto, Canada
- Charles Simeon (1759–1836), English evangelical clergyman
- Charles Simeon (colonist) (1816–1867), one of the members of the Canterbury Association who emigrated to Canterbury, New Zealand
- Daphne Simeon, American psychiatrist
- David Simeon (born 1943), British actor
- Doris Simeon (born 1979), award-winning Yoruba and English actress
- Eleazar ben Simeon (fl. 2nd century), Jewish Tanna sage of the fifth generation
- Eric Simeon (1918–2007), Indian school educationalist
- George Simeon (fl. 1614–1624), English landowner and politician who sat in the House of Commons
- Jay Simeon (born 1976), Canadian artist of Haida heritage
- John Simeon (disambiguation)
- José Simeón (born 1991), Spanish basketball player
- Mbaydoum Simeon, member of the Pan-African Parliament from Chad
- Omer Simeon (1902–1959), American jazz clarinetist
- Richard Simeon (1784–1854), English Liberal Party politician
- Silvano Simeon (1945–2010), Italian discus thrower
- Simeon baronets, two baronetcies created for persons with the surname Simeon
- Xavier Siméon (born 1989), Grand Prix motorcycle racer from Belgium

== See also ==
- Joseph Balthasar, Comte Siméon
- Joseph Jérôme, Comte Siméon
- San Simeon (horse)
- Simeon (given name)
- Tribe of Simeon
