= Simane =

Simane may refer to:

- Čestmír Šimáně (1919–2012), Czech nuclear physicist
- Didier Simane, New Caledonian footballer
- Shimane Prefecture
- Sīmane, Latvian surname
