= Assemani =

Assemani is a surname. "Assemani" is an Arabic patronymic which means son of Simeon.

Notable people with the surname include:

- Giuseppe Simone Assemani (1687–1768), Lebanese Maronite Orientalist
- Stefano Evodio Assemani (1709–1782), nephew of Giuseppe Simone
- Giuseppe Luigi Assemani (1710–1782), nephew of Giuseppe Simone and cousin of Stefano Evodio
- Simone Assemani (1752–1820), grandnephew of Giuseppe Simone

== See also ==
- Codex Assemanius
- Chamoun
