= Simas =

- Gender: Male
- Language: Lithuanian
- Name day: 28 October

Origin
- Region of origin: Lithuania

Other names
- Related names: Simonas

Simas is a Lithuanian masculine given name. It is often a diminutive of the name Simonas. People with the name Simas include:

- Simas Buterlevičius (born 1989), Lithuanian basketball player
- Simas Galdikas (born 1987), Lithuanian basketball player
- Simas Jasaitis (born 1982), Lithuanian basketball player
- Simas Skinderis (born 1981), Lithuanian footballer
