= Janaka Ruwanpura =

Sri Lankan academic

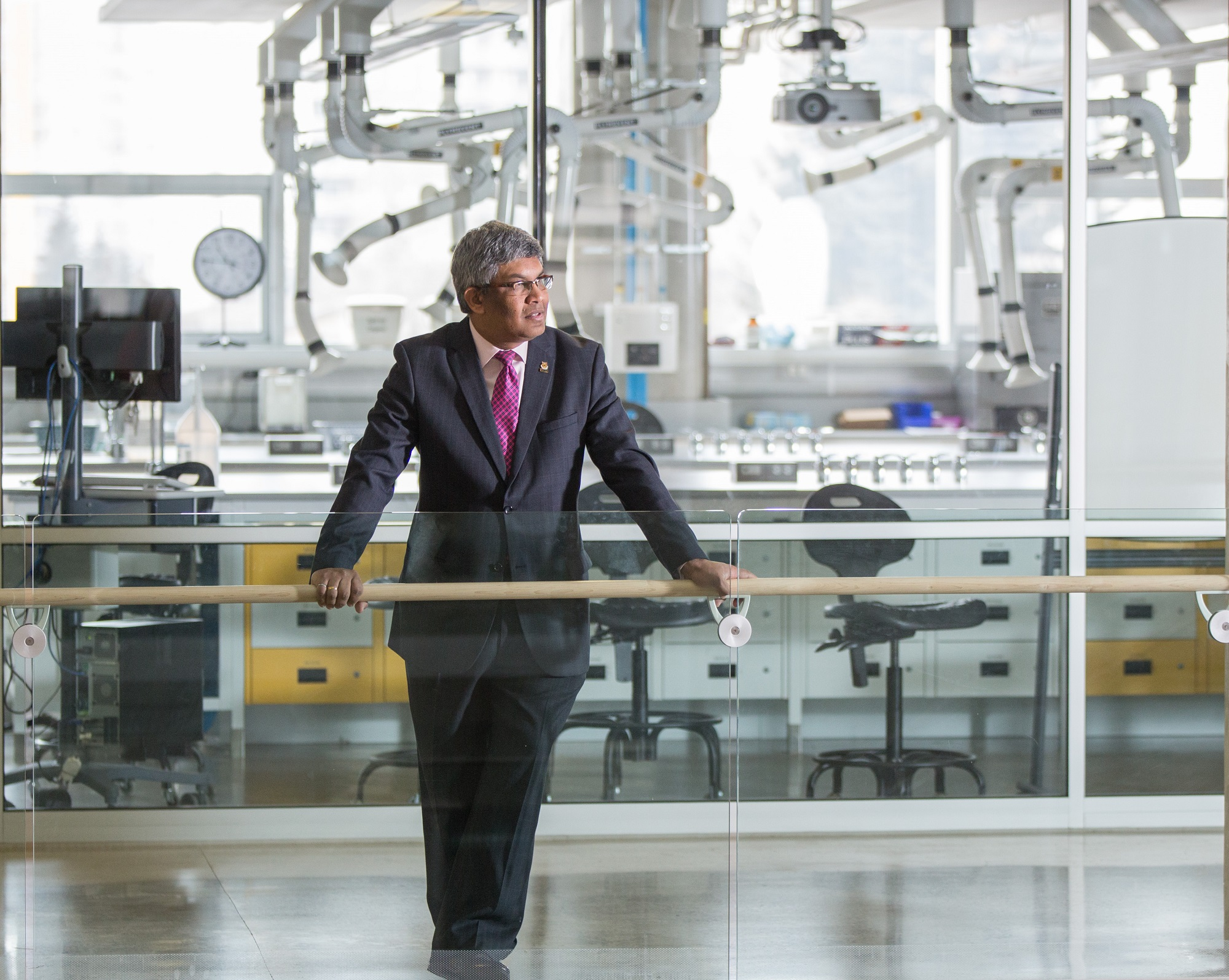
- Janaka Ruwanpura in 2016
- Born: Janaka Yasantha Ruwanpura; Colombo, Sri Lanka
- Education: Nalanda College Colombo; University of Moratuwa; Arizona State University; University of Alberta
- Occupation: Professor
- Employer: University of Calgary
- Title: Professor of Civil Engineering and Project Management (Former Vice-Provost and Associate Vice-President of Research (International) 2013-24)

Janaka Yasantha Ruwanpura is a Professor of Project Management at the Schulich School of Engineering, University of Calgary and the founding President of the Canadian Network of Sri Lankan Academics, launched in February 2024. He served as the Vice Provost and Associate Vice-President of Research (International) at the University of Calgary (equivalent to Pro-Vice-Chancellor in the English system) from September 1, 2020, until March 29, 2024. Previously, he was the Vice-Provost International from 2013 to 2020.

== Early life and education ==
Janaka Yasantha Ruwanpura was born and raised in Colombo, Sri Lanka. He is the son of R.P. Sirisena, a Medical Superintendent, and Nanda Sirisena. Ruwanpura studied at Nalanda College Colombo. Ruwanpura graduated with a Bachelor of Science degree in Quantity Surveying with honors in 1992 from the University of Moratuwa, Sri Lanka. In 1992, he received the Professor H.P.S. Caldera Memorial Award and the Institute of Quantity Surveyors Award. From 1992 to 1995, Ruwanpura worked as a lecturer in Quantity Surveying at the University of Moratuwa. He also worked as a quantity surveying consultant and served as the founding Manager of projects for QServe, a Quantity Surveying firm in Sri Lanka. In 1994, Ruwanpura received the U.S. Fulbright Scholarship and the President's Scholarship of Sri Lanka. In 1995, he accepted the U.S. Fulbright to pursue a Master of Science in Construction Management at Arizona State University and graduated in 1997. Ruwanpura completed his PhD at the University of Alberta in Edmonton, Canada, working with Professor Simaan AbouRizk. Ruwanpura received an F.S. Chia PhD scholarship and obtained a PhD in Construction Engineering and Management in 2001.

== Career ==
In 2001, Ruwanpura joined the University of Calgary as an Assistant Professor in Civil Engineering, specializing in project management. He was promoted to Associate Professor with tenure in 2006, and then to full professor in 2011. Elizabeth Cannon, then Dean of Engineering, nominated him as a Canada Research Chair in Project Management Systems in 2007, which was renewed in 2012 for another 5 years.

He has been serving as the Director of the Project Management Specialization since 2005 and became the founding director of the Centre for Project Management Excellence in the Schulich School of Engineering in 2011. In 2013, Ruwanpura was appointed as the Vice-Provost International of the University of Calgary for a 5-year term. He resigned from the Canada Research Chair to accept this position. The University of Calgary re-appointed him for a second 5-year term as Vice-Provost International until June 2023. In 2020, the University of Calgary appointed him to be both the Vice-Provost and Associate Vice-President of Research (International).

Ruwanpura is a licensed professional engineer in Alberta and a professional quantity surveyor in Canada. He is a Chartered Member of the Royal Institution of Chartered Surveyors, UK (MRICS) and a Fellow of the Institute of Quantity Surveyors in Sri Lanka. He has been inducted as a fellow of the Engineering Institute of Canada and other professional organizations. Ruwanpura was also a founding member and later a convenor of the International Institute for Infrastructure Resilience and Reconstruction.

Ruwanpura has been elected as the executive chair of the Commission on International Initiatives Executive Committee. He is also a member of the Board of the Canadian Bureau for International Education.

=== Vice Provost International at the University of Calgary ===
As Vice Provost International at the University of Calgary, Ruwanpura led the international strategy. His activities in this role included launching IPARI, steering international dual-degree programs, securing major funding, and procuring grants for international study.

== Awards and recognition ==
Ruwanpura developed i-Booth, which has been commercialized. He has published over 180 technical articles. He has delivered 15 keynote speeches and over 200 presentations and workshops. He has received several awards and honors, including many from the University of Calgary. In 2022, he was a winner of the Top 25 Canadian Immigrant Awards selected by Canadian Immigrant.

== Personal life ==
Janaka lives in Calgary with his wife Senani and son Seniru.

== General references ==
- "Janaka Ruwanpura". schulich.ucalgary.ca. 12 December 2018. Archived from the original on 2 April 2015.
- "About the Vice-Provost (International)". www.ucalgary.ca.
- "University of Calgary aims to double international student enrolment, exchange programs". metronews.ca.
