= Simon Jackson =

Simon Jackson may refer to:

- Simon Jackson (cricketer) (born 1985), Jamaican cricketer
- Simon Jackson (judoka) (born 1972), Paralympic judoka of Great Britain
- Simon Jackson (playwright), British playwright, filmmaker and poet
- Simon Jackson, founder of Spirit Bear Youth Coalition, see Spirit Bear: The Simon Jackson Story
