= Halford E. Luccock =

American minister (1885–1960)

Halford Edward Luccock (1885 – November 5, 1960) was a prominent American Methodist minister and professor of homiletics at Yale Divinity School.

Luccock was born in Pittsburgh, the son of Naphtali Luccock. He graduated from Central High School in St. Louis in 1902, attended Washington University in St. Louis until 1905, transferred to Northwestern University where he earned a bachelor's degree in 1906, graduated from Union Theological Seminary in 1909 and earned a master's degree from Columbia University. He was ordained in the Methodist Episcopal ministry in 1910.

His statements in his sermon "Keeping Life Out of Confusion", at the Riverside Church in New York City on September 11, 1938, have been widely quoted. He declared:

When and if fascism comes to America it will not be labeled 'made in Germany'; it will not be marked with a swastika; it will not even be called fascism; it will be called, of course, 'Americanism'.

This was reported the next day in an article headlined "Disguised Fascism Seen As A Menace" in The New York Times.

Other long quoted remarks on the significance of Christmas occurred in his earlier 1915 essay "Everything Upside Down". He later elaborated upon this work in an extended adaptation, "Whoops! It’s Christmas" in 1959, which was published in The Abbott Christmas Book in 1960.

He wrote a column in The Christian Century for many years under the pseudonym "Simeon Stylites," after the ascetic of the same name.

He retired from his Yale professorship in 1953 and died on November 5, 1960.
