= Šimon =

Šimon can be a mononym, a given name, a middle name, or a surname. Notable people with the name include:

== Mononym ==
- Shimon the Varangian, Viking figure

== Given name ==
=== Czech ===
- Šimon Bárta, Czech Roman Catholic bishop
- Šimon Brixi, Czech composer and organist
- Šimon Falta (born 1993), Czech footballer
- Šimon Gabriel (born 2001), Czech football defender
- Šimon Hrubec (born 1991), Czech ice hockey goaltender
- Šimon Pánek, Czech NGO director and former student activist
- Šimon Stránský (born 1997), Czech ice hockey player
- Šimon Šumbera (born 1991), Czech footballer
- Šimon Zajíček (born 2001), Czech ice hockey goaltender

=== Slovak ===
- Šimon Adamov (born 2004), Slovak biathlete and cross-country skier
- Šimon Bartko (born 1996), Slovak biathlete
- Šimon Faško (born 2006), Slovak football midfielder
- Šimon Jurovský, Slovak composer
- Šimon Mičuda, Slovak football right-back
- Šimon Nemec (born 2004), Slovak ice hockey defenceman
- Šimon Ondruš, Slovak linguist
- Šimon Šmehyl (born 1994), Slovak football forward

=== Others ===
- Šimon Szathmáry (born 1995), Czech-Hungarian ice hockey player
- Šimon Voseček, Austrian-Czech composer

== Middle name ==
- Jindřich Šimon Baar, Czech Catholic priest and writer

== Surname ==
- František Šimon (born 1953), Czech cross-country skier
- Július Šimon (born 1965), Czech footballer
- Tavík František Šimon, Czech artist

== See also ==
- Simon (given name)
- Simon (surname)
- Shimon, masculine given name
