= Antonius (monk) =

Greek monk

Antonius (Ancient Greek: Ἀντώνιος) was a Greek monk, and a disciple of the Syriac ascetic saint Simeon Stylites. He lived around the year 460 AD.

Antonius wrote a life of his master Simeon, whom he knew closely. It was written in Greek, and the theologian Leo Allatius claims that he saw a Greek manuscript of it; but the only edition which we know to have been published is a Latin translation in Bolland's Act. Sanctor. i. p. 264. Theologian Gerardus Vossius, who knew only the Latin translation, was doubtful whether he should consider Antonius as a Latin or a Greek historian.
