= Dina Yakerson =

Israeli artist (born 1983)

Dina Semenovna Yakerson
- Ди́на Семёновна Якерсо́н
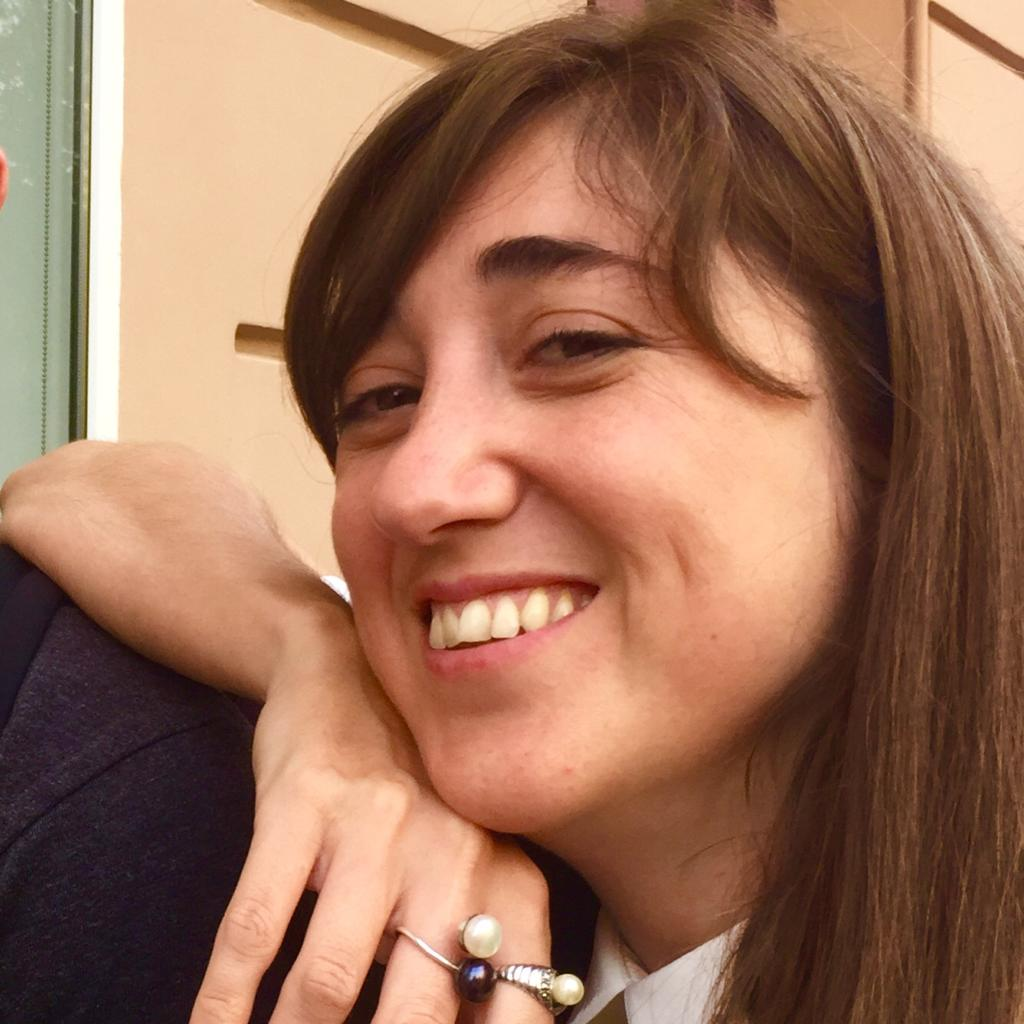
- Dina Yakerson (2019) at the opening of the exhibition in St. Petersburg
- Born: July 12, 1983 (age 43); Leningrad, Russian SFSR, Soviet Union
- Education: Zurich University of the Arts
- Known for: Painting

Dina Yakerson (Russian: Ди́на Семёновна Якерсо́н; born 1983) is an Israeli art historian and artist. She is the daughter of Shimon Iakerson.

== Biography ==
Yakerson was born in Leningrad in 1983 and immigrated to Israel in 1990.

Yakerson studied fine art at Hamidrasha School of Art — Beit Berl College, at Metafora — International Workshop, Barcelona, Spain. She also studied at the International Curatorial Program, CCA and the Kibuzim-Seminar, Tel Aviv, as well as completing her master's degree at the ZHDK – Zurich University of the Arts, Switzerland.

Currently, she lives and works in Jaffa. She has exhibited her works at various art spaces and galleries in Israel, Spain and Russia.

Yakerson explores diverse works by migrant artists that focus on the themes of migration and displacement.

== Artistic work ==
Yakerson has exhibited her work in Israel and internationally in group exhibitions and curated projects. Her drawings and illustrations have appeared in cultural publications and exhibition catalogues, and she has collaborated with cultural institutions and independent publishers.

Curators have noted the intimate scale of her works and their focus on corporeality and inner states, as well as the use of drawing as a primary medium rather than a preparatory tool.

== Exhibitions ==
- 2008 «Figurativo», personal exhibition, Belchica Gallery, Barcelona, Spain
- 2008 «Terra de Ningu», group exhibition, Polidor Center, San Adrián, Spain
- 2008 «Fridolf Doesn’t Weld», group exhibition, International workshop Metafor, Barcelona, Spain
- 2008 «Whiter Shades of Pale», group exhibition, International workshop Metafor, Barcelona, Spain
- 2010 «Salon de Refuses», group exhibition, Amiad Center, Jaffa, Israel
- 2010 «Grobman», group exhibition, Kishon Gallery, group exhibition, Tel Aviv, Israel
- 2011 «Moledet | Rodina», group exhibition, Center for Contemporary Art Pyramida, Haifa, Israel
- 2014 «Spring Salon», group exhibition, Jaffa Salon Art Gallery, Jaffa, Israel
- 2015 «Bread & Roses», group exhibition, Shenkar College, Ramat Gan, Israel
- 2016 «Miklat 209 — Performance Art Platform», group exhibition, Miklat 209, Tel Aviv, Israel
- 2016 Artemisia Art Gallery, group exhibition, Tel Aviv, Israel
- 2016 «Painting Camp 2016», group exhibition, Negev Museum of Art, Beersheba, Israel
- 2018 «Minotaur & the Fish», personal exhibition, House of Artists, Tel Aviv, Israel
- 2018 «Lubok», personal exhibition, Gallery 4, Tel Aviv, Israel
- 2019 «Shesh-Besh», personal exhibition, DiDi Gallery, St. Petersburg, Russia
Examples of the work of Dina Yakerson

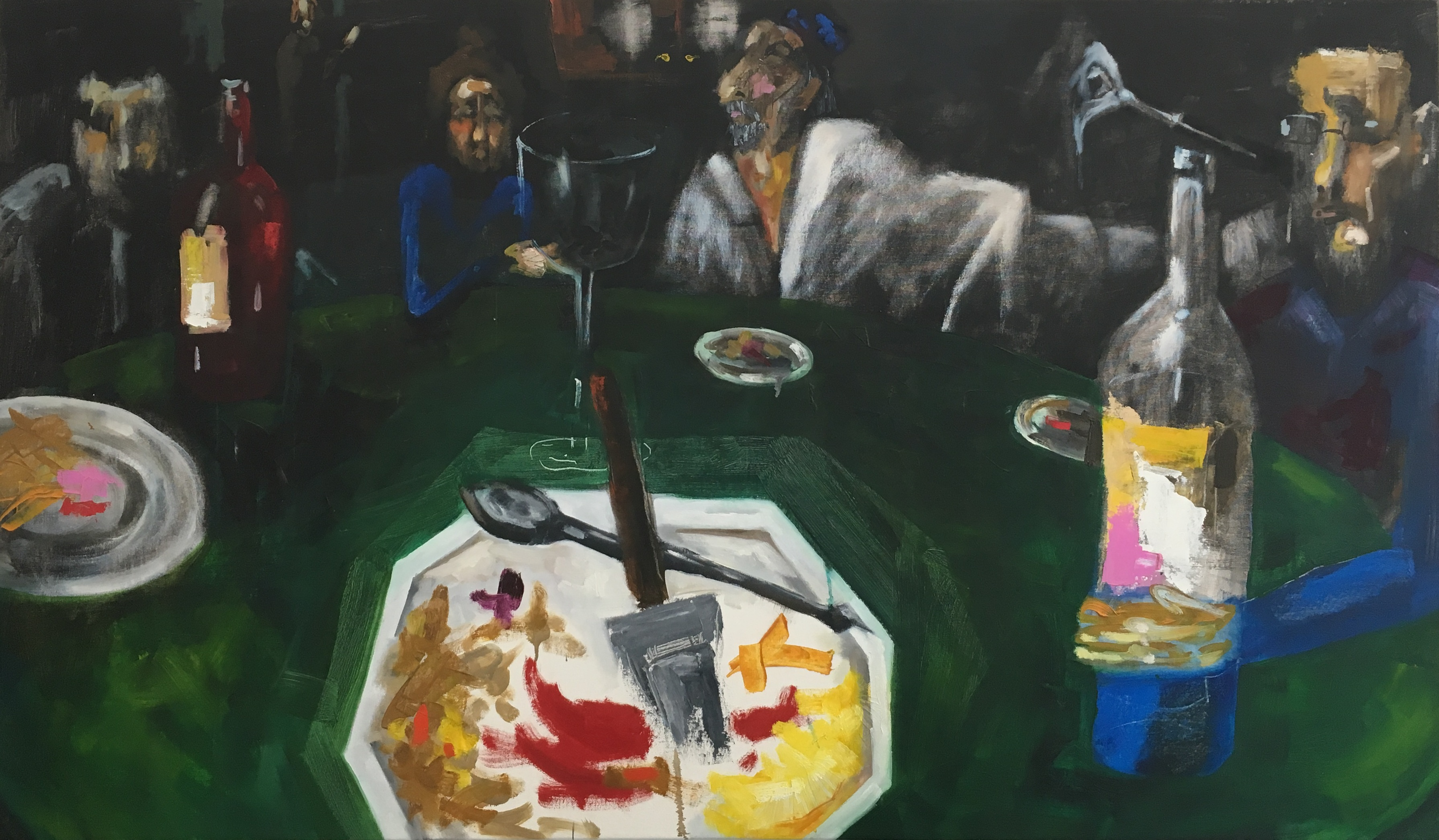
Feast (2014)

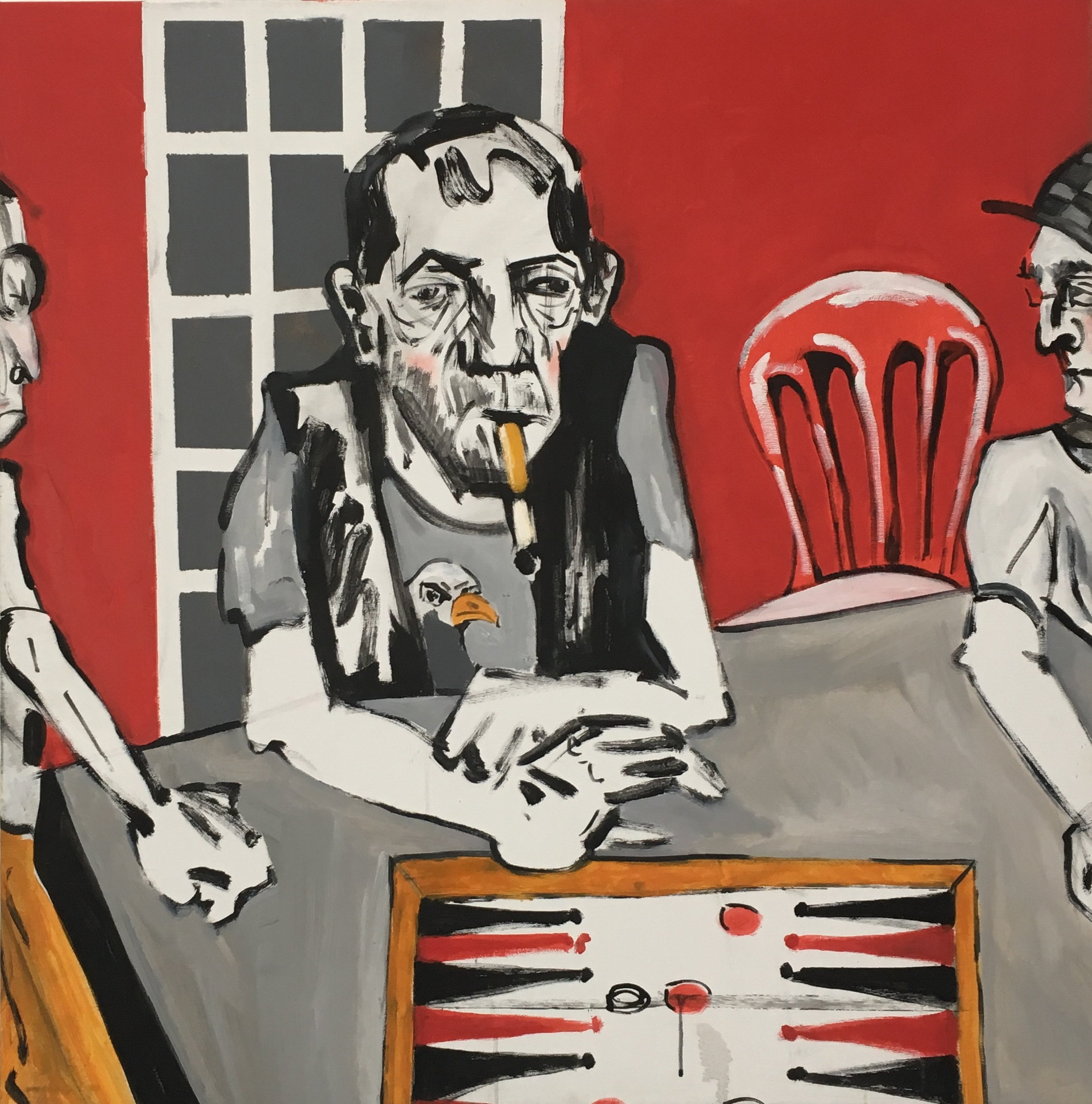
Shesh-Besh (2016)

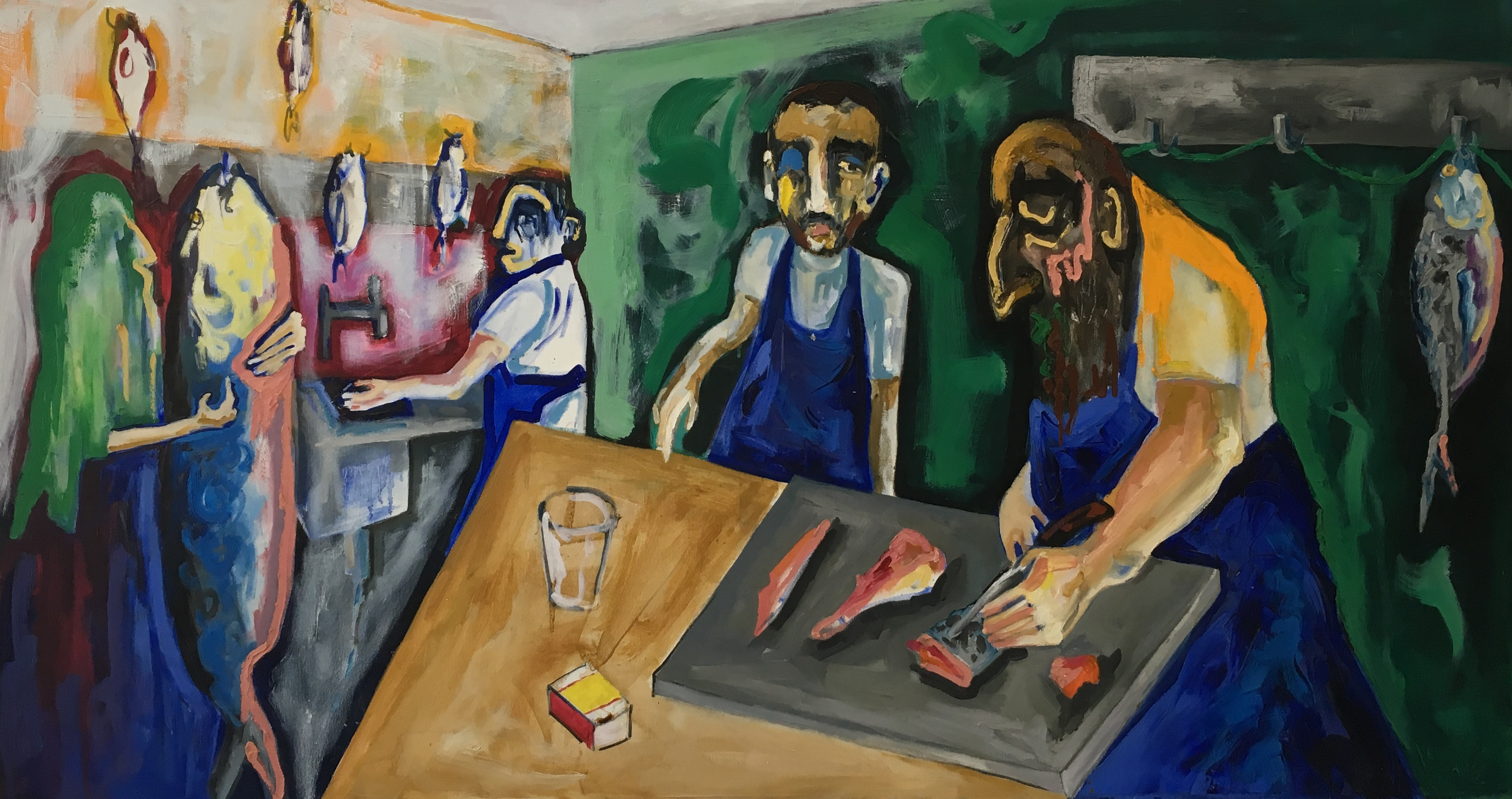
Jaffa fish (2016)

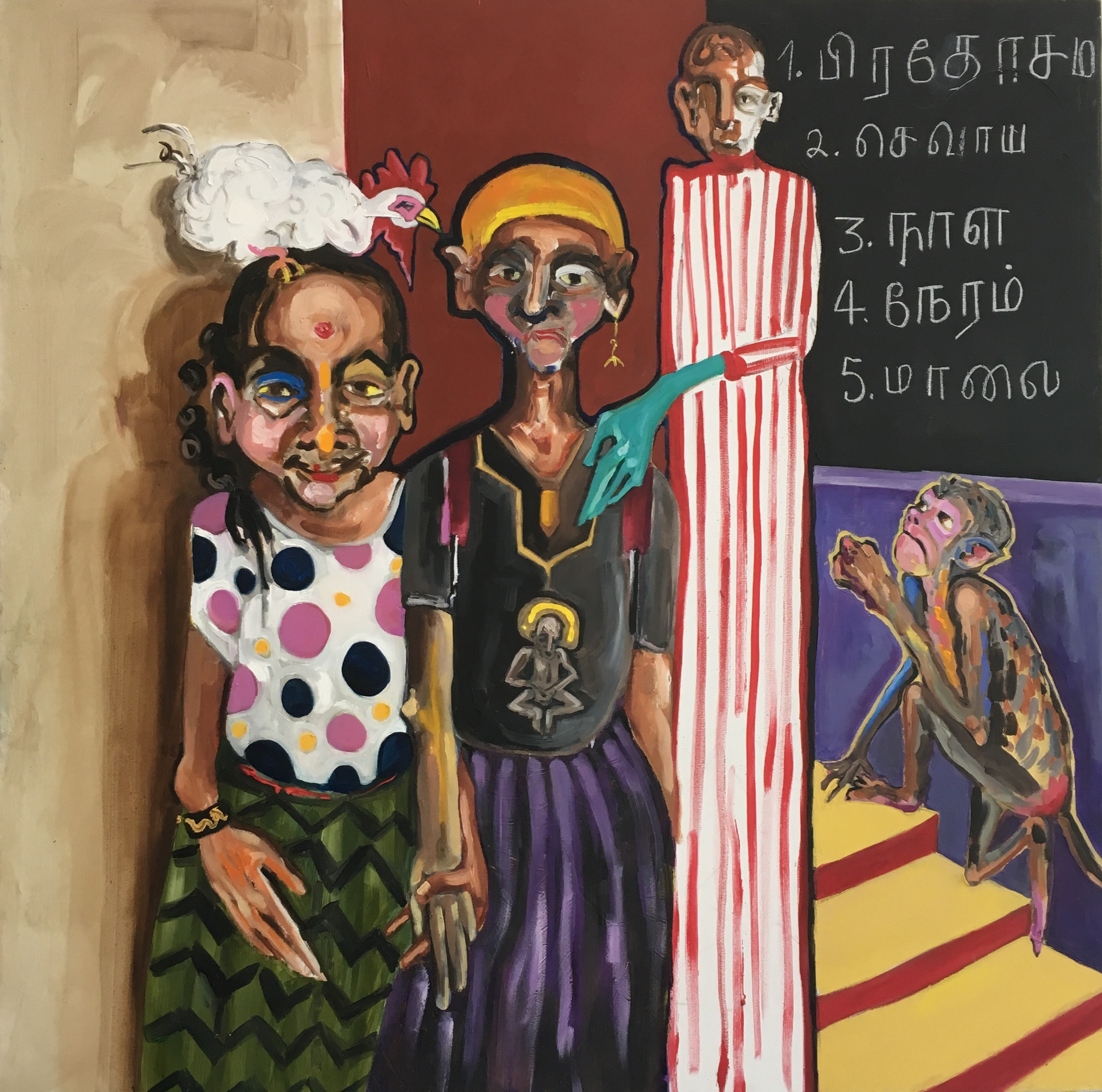
Classroom (2017)

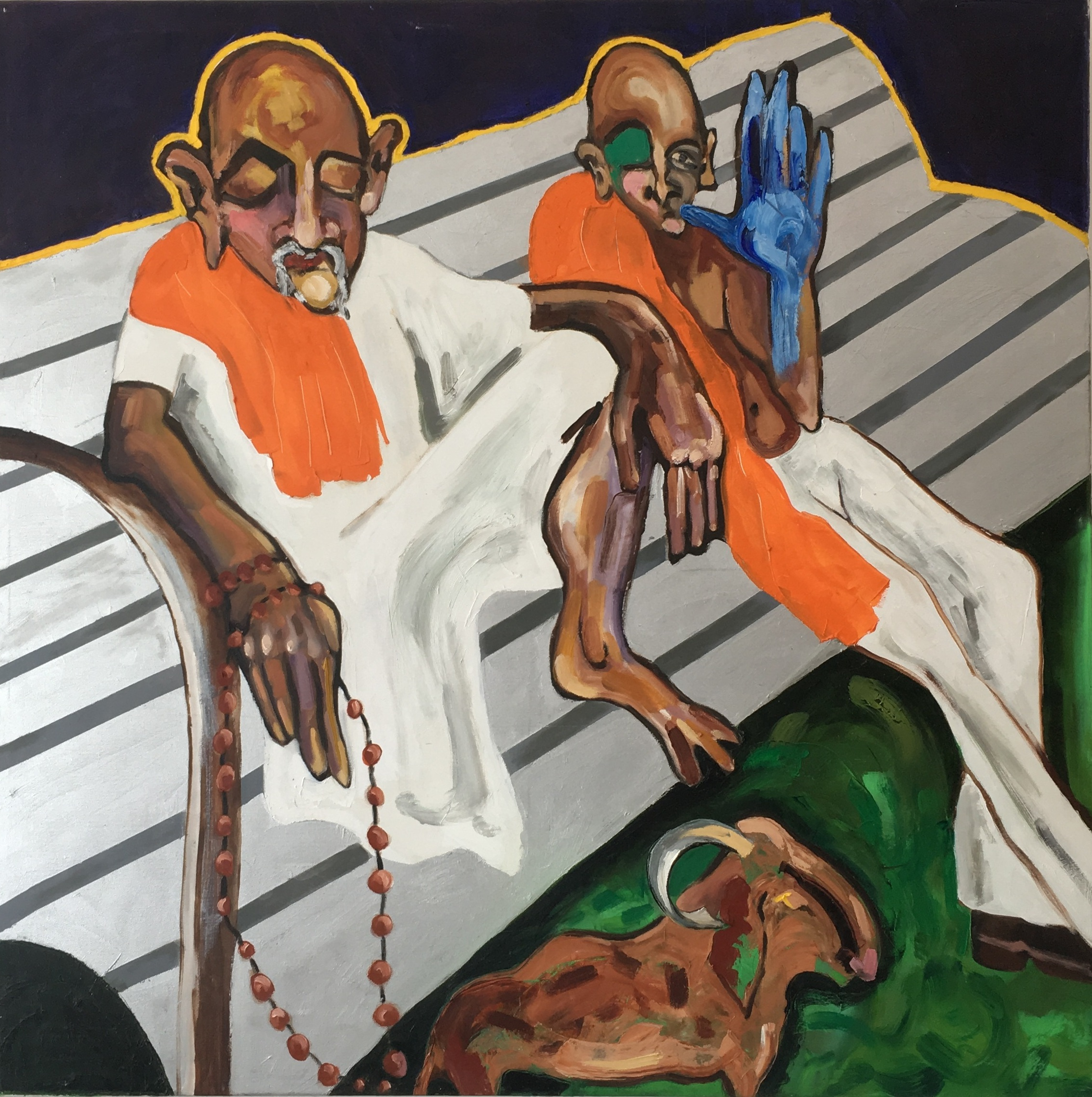
Bench (2017)
