= Haimona =

Haimona is a both a given name and a surname. It is a Māori transliteration of the name Simon. Notable people with the name include:

== As a given name ==
- Haimona Pita Matangi (c. 1780–1839), New Zealand tribal leader
- Haimona Patete (1863–1921), New Zealand Māori leader and religious founder

== As a surname ==
- Kelly Haimona (born 1986), New Zealand rugby union player
