= Simão =

Simao may refer to:

== Portuguese name ==
- Simão (footballer, born 1928), Brazilian footballer
- Simão Sabrosa (born 1979), Portuguese footballer
- Simão Mate Junior (born 1988), Mozambican footballer
- Miguel Simão (born 1973), former Portuguese footballer
- Ayres Cerqueira Simão (born 1988), Brazilian football player
- Simão Jatene (born 1949), Governor of the Brazilian state of Pará
- Simão Morgado (born 1979), male Portuguese swimmer
- Simão Rodrigues (1510–1579), was a Portuguese Jesuit priest
- Simão (Angolan footballer) (born 1976), Angolan football player
- Bruno Simão (born 1985), Portuguese football player
- David Simão (born 1990), Portuguese professional footballer
- Leonardo Simão (born 1953), Mozambican politician
- Paulo Simão (born 1976), Portuguese basketball player
- Simão (footballer, born 1968), Brazilian football defensive midfielder
- Simão (footballer, born 1984), Brazilian football attacking midfielder
- Pinda Simão (born 1949), Angolan politician

== Places ==
- São Simão, Goiás, Brazil
- São Simão, São Paulo, Brazil
- São Simão de Gouveia, Portugal
- Sarnadas de São Simão, Oleiros, Portugal
- São Simão de Litém, Pombal, Portugal
- São Simão, Nisa Portugal
- São Simão, Setúbal Portugal

=== Simao ===
- Simao District (Chinese: 思茅), in Pu'er City, Yunnan, China
- Samao, former name of Pu'er City, capital of Simao District

== See also ==
- Simon (disambiguation)
