= Symon =

Symon is both a surname and given name. Notable people with the name include:

== Surname ==
- Don Symon (born 1960), New Zealand Olympic rower
- Josiah Symon (1846–1934), Scottish-Australian lawyer and politician
- Keith Symon (1920–2013), American physicist
- Michael Symon (born 1969), American restaurant and television chef
- Mike Symon (born 1969), Australian politician from Deakin; Parliament member since 2007
- Paul Symon (born 1960), senior officer in the Australian Army
- Peter Symon (1922–2008), Australian politician
- Scot Symon (1911–1985), Scottish professional football manager
- Vanda Symon (born 1969), New Zealand crime writer and radio host

== Given name ==
- Symon Budny (c. 1530–1593), Polish-Belarusian humanist, educator, philosopher, sociologist and historian
- Symon Gould (died 1963), American Vegetarian Party founder
- Symon Hill, British activist and journalist
- Symon Petliura (1879–1926), Ukrainian politician, statesman, writer, and journalist
- Symon Sadik Bangladeshi film actor
- Symon Semeonis, 14th-century Irish Franciscan friar and author

== See also ==
- Simeon
- Simon (disambiguation)
- Simons
- Symons
