= Saint-Simon =

Saint-Simon or Saint Simon can refer to:

== Places ==
=== Canada ===
- Saint-Simon, New Brunswick, a settlement in Gloucester County, New Brunswick
- Saint-Simon, Quebec, a municipality in southwestern Quebec on the Yamaska River in Les Maskoutains Regional County Municipality
- Saint-Simon-les-Mines, Quebec, a municipality in the Municipalité régionale de comté de Beauce-Sartigan in Quebec, Canada
- Saint-Simon-de-Rimouski, Quebec, a parish municipality in the Les Basques Regional County Municipality in the Bas-Saint-Laurent region of Quebec

=== France ===
- Saint-Simon, Aisne, in the Aisne département
- Saint-Simon, Cantal, in the Cantal département
- Saint-Simon, Charente, in the Charente département
- Saint-Simon, Lot, in the Lot département
- Saint-Simon-de-Bordes, in the Charente-Maritime département
- Saint-Simon-de-Pellouaille, in the Charente-Maritime département

=== United States ===
- St. Simons, Georgia

== Organizations ==
- Saint-Simon Foundation, a defunct French think tank

== Other ==
- Simon (given name), is a given name

== People ==
- Simon the Zealot, one of the apostles of Jesus, canonized
- Simon the Athonite, or Simon the Myrrhbearer, founder of Simonopetra, the monastery of Mount Athos, canonized
- Simon of Cyrene, the man who carried the cross of Jesus as Jesus was taken to his crucifixion, canonized
- Saint Simon of Lipnica, 15th century Polish priest, canonized
- Louis de Rouvroy, duc de Saint-Simon, courtier in the court of Louis XIV and writer of memoirs thereof
- Claude Henri de Rouvroy, comte de Saint-Simon, utopian socialist and originator of Saint-Simonism
- San Simón, a Latin American folk saint
- Simon the Tanner, after whom the cave church in Egypt is named

== See also ==
- St. Simon (horse), a racehorse
- Saint-Simonism, an early socialist philosophy
- Saint Simeon (disambiguation)
- Simon of Trent, canonized 1575 (approximate)
- The Shins' album Chutes Too Narrow, which contains the song "Saint Simon"
