= John Simeon =

John Simeon may refer to:

- Sir John Simeon, 1st Baronet (1756–1824), Member of Parliament (MP) for Reading 1797–1802 and 1806–1818
- Sir John Simeon, 3rd Baronet (1815–1870), British politician and naval officer
- Sir John Simeon, 4th Baronet, MP for Southampton 1895–1906
