= Chaouki Chamoun =

Lebanese contemporary artist

- Born: January 19, 1942 (age 84); Sariine, Lebanon
- Known for: Artist

Chaouki Chamoun (born January 19, 1942) is a Lebanese contemporary artist.

== Biography ==
Chaouki Chamoun was born in Sarine, in the Bekaa Valley. As a school boy he worked as an art instructor to pay for the education of himself and his younger brothers, while at the same time attending art and design night schools, before finally joining the Fine Art Institute at the Lebanese University in Beirut in fall 1968, at the age of 26. He received his Diploma of Higher Studies in Painting in 1972, and received a five-year scholarship on to study art in the United States the same year.

In 1975, Chaouki received his Master of Fine Arts from Syracuse University, New York. He was a PhD fellow at New York University from 1975 to 1979. Chaouki since continued his academic career as an influential educator and architectural designer both in the United States and in Lebanon, and has donated a number of his works to raise funds and scholarships for educational and social institutions in Lebanon, including Brave Heart, Tawasul, Seri-Art, Lebanese American University.

In 2013, he published The Art and Life of Chaouki Chamoun, an artistic autobiography with more than 300 illustrations of his work, combined with anecdotes and observations about art and the creative process. The book was one of a series on Lebanese artists such as sculptor Hussein Madi and painter and printmaker Mohammad Rawas.

A major exhibition of his work was held in 2013 at the Beirut Exhibition Center.

== Publications ==
- Chamoun, Chaouki (September 2013). Prescott, Brian (ed.). The Art and Life of Chaouki Chamoun. Saqi Books. ISBN 9780863567919. Archived from the original on 20 December 2014.
