= Simon =

Simon may refer to:

== People ==
- Simon (given name), including a list of people and fictional characters with the given name Simon
- Simon (surname), including a list of people with the surname Simon

== Places ==
- Şimon (Hungarian: Simon), a village in Bran Commune, Braşov County, Romania
- Șimon, a right tributary of the river Turcu in Romania

== Arts, entertainment, and media ==
=== Films ===
- Simon (1980 film), starring Alan Arkin
- Simon (2004 film), Dutch drama directed by Eddy Terstall
- Simón (2018 film), Venezuelan short film directed by Diego Vicentini
- Simón (2023 film), Venezuelan feature film directed by Diego Vicentini

=== Games ===
- Simon (game), a popular computer game
- Simon Says, children's game

=== Literature ===
- Simon (Sutcliff novel), a children's historical novel written by Rosemary Sutcliff
- Simon (Sand novel), an 1835 novel by George Sand
- Simon Necronomicon (1977), a purported grimoire written by an unknown author, with an introduction by a man identified only as "Simon"

=== Music ===
- Simon (album), an album by the band Gruvis Malt
- Simon (EP), an EP by Dirty Little Rabbits
- "Simon" (song), a song by Joan Armatrading

=== Television ===
- Simon (French TV series), a 2016 French animated children's television series
- Simon (American TV series), a 1995 American sitcom
- Simon & Simon, 1980s television series with brother detectives
- Simon (The Walking Dead), a fictional character from the television series The Walking Dead

=== Other arts, entertainment, and media ===
- Simon's Cat, an animated cartoon and book series
- WSMW, aka Simon FM, a radio station in Greensboro, North Carolina

== Brands and enterprises ==
- La Maison Simons, a Quebec department store
- Simon Property Group

== Electronics and technology ==
- Simon (cipher)
- Simon (computer), a 1950s personal computer
- IBM Simon the first smartphone
- SIMON breach grenade, a door breaching rifle grenade

== Other uses ==
- Simon (cat), a ship's cat who was awarded the Dickin Medal

== See also ==
- Justice Simon (disambiguation)
- Saint-Simon (disambiguation)
- Shimon (disambiguation)
- Shimun (disambiguation)
- Simao (disambiguation)
- Simeon (disambiguation)
- Simone (disambiguation)
