= Simonis =

Simonis is both a surname and a given name. Notable people with the name include:

- Adrianus Johannes Simonis (1931–2020), Dutch Roman Catholic cardinal and former archbishop of Utrecht
- Eugène Simonis or Eugen Simonis (1810–1893), Belgian sculptor and architect
- Heide Simonis (1943–2023), German politician
- Kazys Šimonis (1887–1978), Lithuanian artist
- Simonis Palaiologina (1294– after 1336), Byzantine princess and third wife of Stefan Uroš II Milutin of Serbia
- Simonis Starovolsci (1588–1656), Polish scholar

== See also ==
- Simono, a Native American group that lived in Nuevo León and later in eastern Texas.
