= Simeon, Nebraska =

Unincorporated community in Cherry County, Nebraska

Coordinates: 42°36′48″N 100°43′12″W

Simeon is an unincorporated community in Cherry County, Nebraska, United States.

== History ==
A post office was established at Simeon in 1884, and remained in operation until it was discontinued in 1953. Simeon was named for Simeon Mortgareidge, a rancher.
