= Simone =

Simone may refer to:

== People ==
- Simone (given name), a feminine (or Italian masculine) given name of Hebrew origin
- Simone (surname), an Italian surname
- People known mononymously as Simone include:
  - Simone Bittencourt de Oliveira (born 1949), Brazilian singer
  - Simone Egeriis (born 1992), Danish pop singer
  - Simone Philip Kamel (born 1966), Egyptian singer
  - Simone Mendes (born 1984), Brazilian singer-songwriter
  - Lisa Simone (born 1962), American singer, composer and actress
  - Nina Simone (1933–2003), American singer, songwriter, musician, arranger, and civil rights activist

== Films ==
- Simone (1918 film), a French silent drama film
- Simone (1926 film), a French silent drama film
- Simone (2002 film), a science-fiction drama film

== Other uses ==
- Tropical Storm Simone (disambiguation), two tropical cyclones in the Eastern Pacific Ocean
  - 1961's Tropical Storm Simone – a continuation of Atlantic Hurricane Hattie
  - Tropical Storm Simone (1968)
- "Simone", a song by Goldfrapp from Tales of Us
- Simone (character), a fictional character in the ABC Family show The Nine Lives of Chloe King
- Simone (The Marvelous Mrs. Maisel), an episode from season 2 of The Marvelous Mrs. Maisel

== See also ==
- Simon (disambiguation)
