= Shimun Vrochek =

Russian sci-fi author

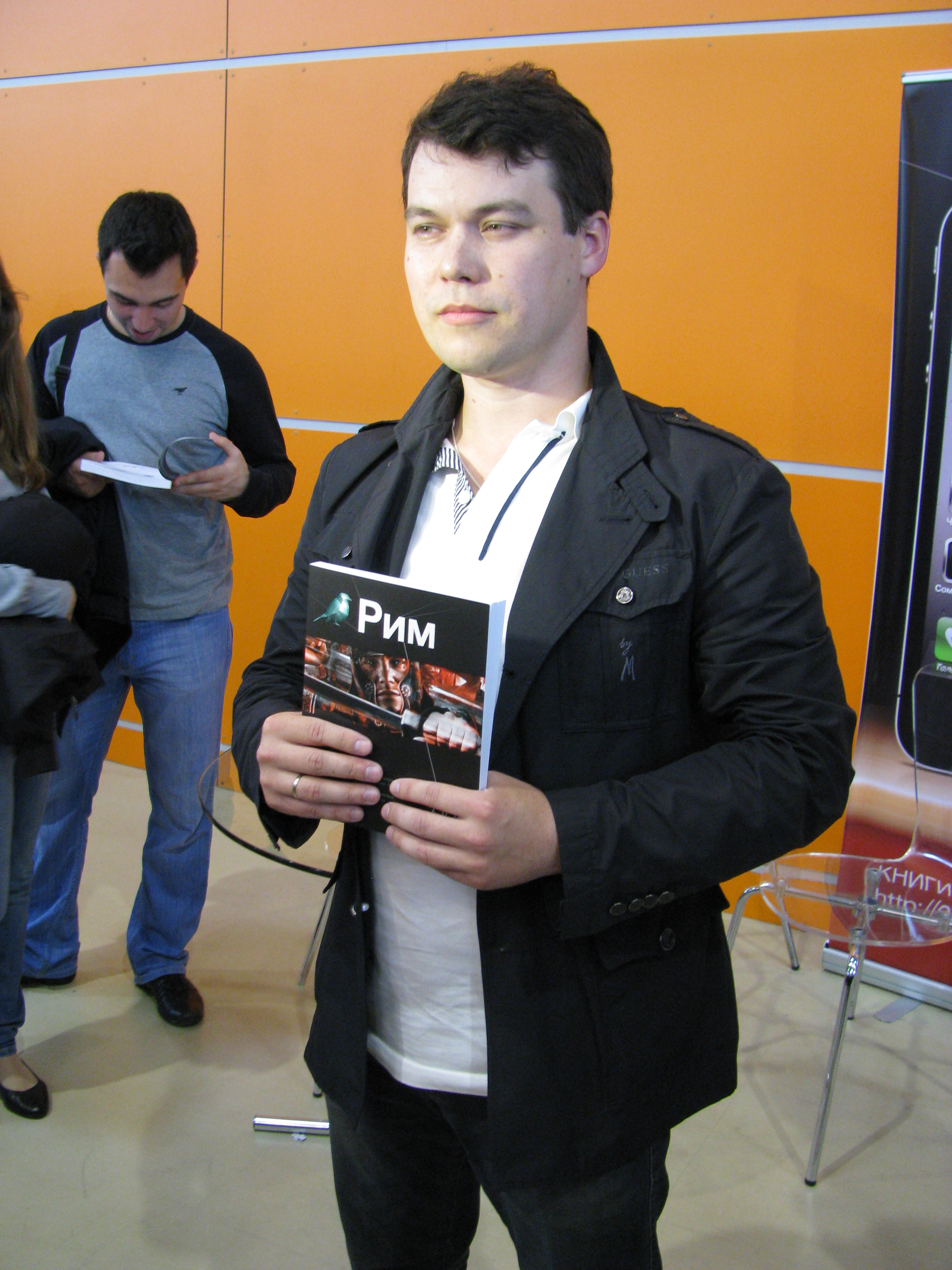
- Vrochek in September of 2011
- Born: Dmitry Stanislavovich Ovchinnikov; 1 November 1976 (age 49); Kungur, Russian SFSR, Soviet Union
- Occupation: Writer
- Writing career
- Genres: Sci-fi, fantasy
- Notable work: Piter

Shimun Vrochek (Russian: Шимун Врочек), real name Dmitry S. Ovchinnikov (Russian: Дмитрий Овчинников) (born 1 November 1976) is a Russian science fiction author. His work Piter (a novel from the Universe of Metro 2033 book series) has been cited as a case study of the boom in prosumer level participation in Russian fan fiction, using transmedia in ways that echo traditional Soviet methods, yet is completely commodified.

== Life and career ==
Vrochek was born in the Northern Urals, in the Kungur region and grew up in Nizhnevartovsk. He graduated from Gubkin Russian State University of Oil and Gas, then enrolled in graduate school but did not complete his studies.

He has been a writer since 2001. In 2003 he began studying acting at Russian Academy of Theatre Arts. He then studied directing at the Boris Shchukin Theater Institute under Leonid Heifetz. He is best known as the author of Piter, a novel from the Metro 2033 universe. All of his works were originally written in Russian, though some of them have been translated to other languages. Piter has been translated to a number of European languages – such as German, Polish and Spanish.

In 2006, Мир Фантастики honored his work as "best national collection." That year, his short story collection Serzhantu Nikto Ne Zvonit won the Golden Caduceus at the Kharkiv International Fiction Festival (nicknamed the Star Bridge festival).

== Selected publications ==
- Nobody Calls the Sergeant (Сержанту никто не звонит), 2006
- Wild Talent (Дикий Талант) (co-author), 2009
- Piter (Вселенная Метро 2033: Питер), 2010
- Tango Iron Heart (Танго железного сердца), 2011
- Latin K. 1. – Last Legat (Рим. К. 1. Последний Легат), part of Etnogenez project, 2011
- Uber and the Revolution (Вселенная Метро 2033: Убер и все-все-все). The Last Refuge (Вселенная Метро 2033: Последнее убежище), 2011 (novella)
- Latin K. 2. – The Legions Ask for Fire (Рим. К. 2. Легионы просят огня), 2015
- Piter. War. (Вселенная Метро 2033: Питер. Война.), 2018
- The Golden Bullet (Золотая пуля), co-authored with Yuriy Nekrasov, 2019
- How to Survive Among Princesses (Как выжить среди принцесс), collection of short stories, 2019
- Piter. Battle of the Twins (Вселенная Метро 2033: Питер. Битва близнецов), 2019
