= Shimon Iakerson =

- Семён Мордухович Якерсон
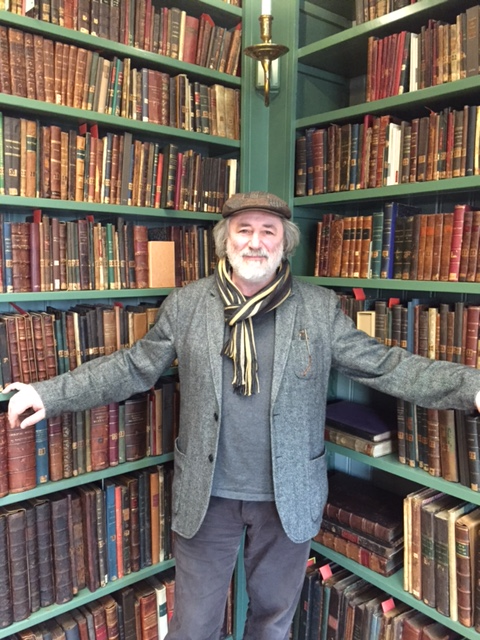
- Iakerson in 2016
- Born: August 4, 1956 (age 70); Leningrad, Russian SFSR, Soviet Union
- Known for: Research on Hebrew manuscripts and incunabula
- Awards: Honorable Medal of the Euro-Asian Jewish Congress (2005); Antsiferov Prize (2009); Narkiss Prize (2023)

Academic background
- Education: Saint Petersburg State University

Shimon Iakerson (Russian: Семён Мордухович Якерсон; born August 4, 1956) is a Russian scholar specializing in medieval Hebrew manuscripts and incunabula.

== Career ==
Iakerson is a specialist in Hebrew palaeography, codicology, and the history of early Hebrew printing. He is affiliated with the Institute of Oriental Manuscripts of the Russian Academy of Sciences, where he serves as a senior researcher, and has been associated with the Hebrew Palaeography Project (Jerusalem). He is also affiliated with St. Petersburg State University, where he has held academic teaching and administrative positions in the field of Semitic and Hebrew studies.

Iakerson has delivered lectures and presentations at academic and cultural institutions in Europe, Israel, and the United States. In February 2010, he delivered a public lecture at the Library of Congress devoted to Hebrew manuscript and early printed collections in Russia.

In addition to academic research, Iakerson has been involved in museum work related to Jewish history and material culture, including curatorial activity connected with Judaica collections of the Russian Museum of Ethnography. His participation in the development of Jewish museum exhibitions in post-Soviet Russia has been discussed in scholarly literature on contemporary Jewish museology.

== Research and publications ==
Iakerson’s research focuses on Hebrew manuscripts, early Hebrew printed books, and the transmission of Jewish textual culture from the medieval to the early modern period. He is the author and editor of numerous scholarly works published in Russian, Hebrew, English, French, and Dutch.

Among his major works is the Catalogue of Hebrew Incunabula from the Collection of the Library of the Jewish Theological Seminary of America (2004–2005), which provides a detailed scholarly description of Hebrew incunabula preserved in the Seminary’s library.

== Awards and recognition ==
In 2005, Iakerson received the Honorable Medal of the Euro-Asian Jewish Congress “For Service to the Jewish People” for his work on Hebrew incunabula. In 2009, he was awarded the Antsiferov Prize in Saint Petersburg studies for the illustrated volume Jewish Treasures of Petersburg: Scrolls, Codices, Documents.

In 2023, he received the Bezalel, Mordechai, and Nessia Narkiss Prize for excellence in the research of Jewish art, awarded by the Center for Jewish Art of the Hebrew University of Jerusalem.

A Festschrift was published in honor of S. M. Iakerson’s 70th birthday.

Scienti fata libellorum [To One Who Knows the Fates of Books]: A Collection of Essays in Honor of Semen Iakerson on the Occasion of His Seventieth Birthday / eds. Elena Yuzbashyan, Semen Parizhsky, Alina Lisitsyna, and Ekaterina Belkina. — Jerusalem, 2026. — 420 pp., ill. ISBN 978-965-596-124-9.

== Family ==
Iakerson has two daughters.

- Dina Yakerson (born 1983) is an Israeli art historian and artist.
- Maria Yakerson (born 1994) is a mathematician specializing in algebraic geometry and homotopy theory. She is affiliated with the University of Oxford and Sorbonne University and is active in the public communication of mathematics.

== Selected bibliography ==
Among Hebrew Manuscripts. Essays about Books and People. Tel Aviv-Yafo, 2026.

- Hebrew Incunabula. Moscow: Knizhniki, 2023.
- From Letter to Type: Essays on the History of the Medieval Hebrew Book. Saint Petersburg, 2016.
- Jewish Treasures of Petersburg: Scrolls, Codices, Documents. Saint Petersburg, 2008.
- Catalogue of Hebrew Incunabula from the Collection of the Library of the Jewish Theological Seminary of America. Vols. 1–2. New York & Jerusalem, 2004–2005.
- Ohel Hayim: A Catalogue of Hebrew Manuscripts of the Manfred and Anne Lehmann Family. Vol. 3: Printed Books. New York, 1996.
