= Daphne Simeon =

Daphne Simeon is an American psychiatrist, best known for her research on depersonalization disorder.

== Education ==
Simeon is a graduate of Columbia University's medical school, psychiatry residency and fellowship program, and psychoanalytic institute. Simeon works at Beth Israel Medical Center in New York, at the Family Center for Bipolar Disorder.

== Career ==
Simeon was an associate professor of psychiatry at the Mount Sinai School of Medicine in New York City, where she did research, supervised, and taught. It is here that she ran a clinic that specifically treated depersonalization disorder. She also co-chaired an international task force that generated new recommendations for the DSM-V classification of dissociative disorders.

== Works ==
With editor and magazine writer Jeffrey Abugel, Simeon co-authored the book Feeling Unreal: Depersonalization Disorder and the Loss of the Self (ISBN 0-19-517022-9), published by Oxford University Press in 2006. The book provides a thorough exploration of depersonalization disorder and represents more than a century of research. It presents a distillation of the scientific research on this disorder, the philosophical and literary references, as well as current treatment options.
