= Siim Sukles =

Estonian sports figure

Siim Sukles (born 17 July 1972 in Pärnu) is an Estonian sports figure.

In 2000 he graduated from the private high school Veritas' department of law.

1994-1997 he was the executive director of Eesti Olümpiafond. 1997-2000 he was the executive director of Estonian Olympic Committee. 2002-2012 he was chancellor of Ministry of Culture. Since 2013 he is Secretary General of Estonian Olympic Committee.

Awards:

- 2012: Merited Order of Estonian Olympic Committee (Estonian: EOK teenetemärk).
