= Shimon =

Shimon (Hebrew: שמעון) is the original Hebrew pronunciation of the names Simon and Simeon. Among individuals, Shimon can refer to:

== Given names ==
- Shimon Agranat (1906-1992), Israeli judge and President of the Israeli Supreme Court
- Shimon Amsalem (born 1966), Israeli basketball player
- Shimon Dotan (born 1949), Israeli filmmaker
- Shimon Gershon (born 1977), Israeli footballer
- Shimon Iakerson (born 1956), Russian historian
- Shimon Kagan (1942-2024), Israeli chess player
- Shimon Lev-Ari (1942–2012), Israeli actor, director and translator
- Shimon Moore (born 1982), Australian musician
- Shimon Moyal (1866–1915) was a Zionist activist and physician
- Shimon Peres (1923-2016), Israeli politician and President of Israel
- Shimon Sakaguchi (born 1951), Japanese immunologist
- Shimon Shetreet (born 1946), Israeli politician
- Shimon Ullman (born 1948), Israeli computer scientist
- Shimon Bar Yonah (1 BC-68 AD), the first Pope of the Roman Catholic Church, also known as Saint Peter
- Shimon (DJ), British music producer
- Šimon, a Viking warrior in Kyivan Rus

== Surnames ==
- Masato Shimon (born 1944), Japanese singer
- Ran Ben Shimon (born 1970), Israeli football player and manager
- Samuel Shimon (born 1956), Iraqi Assyrian journalist

== See also ==
- Simon (given name)
- Shimun
