= Simeon =

Simeon (/ˈsɪmiən/) is a given name, from the Hebrew שמעון (Biblical Šimʿon, Tiberian Šimʿôn), usually transliterated in English as Shimon. In Greek, it is written Συμεών, hence the Latinized spelling Symeon. It is a cognate of the name Simon.

== Meaning ==
The name is derived from Simeon, son of Jacob and Leah, patriarch of the Tribe of Simeon. The text of Genesis (29:33) states that the name of Simeon refers to Leah's belief that God had heard that she was hated by Jacob, in the sense of not being as favoured as Rachel.

כִּי־שָׁמַע יְהוָה כִּי־שְׂנוּאָה אָנֹכִי וַיִּתֶּן־לִי גַּם־אֶת־זֶה וַתִּקְרָא שְׁמֹו שִׁמְעֹון׃
Because the LORD had heard that I was hated, he had therefore given me this son also: and she called his name Simeon.

Implying a derivation from the Hebrew term shama on, meaning "he has heard"; this is a similar etymology as the Torah gives for the theophoric name Ishmael ("God has heard"; Genesis 16:11), on the basis of which it has been argued that the tribe of Simeon may originally have been an Ishmaelite group (Cheyne and Black, Encyclopaedia Biblica). Alternatively, Hitzig, W. R. Smith, Stade, and Kerber compared שִׁמְעוֹן Šīmə‘ōn to Arabic سِمع simˤ "the offspring of the hyena and the female wolf"; as supports, Smith points to Arabic tribal names Simˤ "a subdivision of the defenders (the Medinites)" and Samˤān "a subdivision of Tamim".

In classical rabbinical sources, the name is sometimes interpreted as meaning "he who listens [to the words of God]" (Genesis Rabbah 61:4), and at other times thought to derive from sham 'in, meaning "there is sin", which is argued to be a prophetic reference to Zimri's sexual miscegenation with a Midianite woman, a type of relationship which rabbinical sources regard as sinful (Jewish Encyclopedia).

== In the Bible ==
- Simeon (son of Jacob), in the Hebrew Bible
- Tribe of Simeon, one of the twelve tribes of Israel
- Simeon the Just (3rd century BC?) a Jewish High Priest, also called "Simeon the Righteous" (not the same as the New Testament figure, below)
- Simeon (Gospel of Luke), figure in the New Testament who blessed Jesus and his parents in the Jerusalem temple
- Simeon Niger, person in the Book of Acts

== Persons with the given name ==
=== Up to 1700 ===
Ordered chronologically.

- Simeon of Jerusalem (15–14 BC–c. 107 or 117), 2nd Bishop of Jerusalem, perhaps one of the Seventy Apostles sent out by Jesus
- Simeon ben Gamliel, Nasi of the Sanhedrin in 50 AD
- Simeon ben Gamliel II, Nasi of the Sanhedrin in c. 118 AD
- Simeon Bar Kokhba, leader of the Bar Kokhba revolt
- Simeon bar Yochai, rabbi of the Tannaim period, possibly the author of the Zohar
- Simeon Stylites (c. 388–459 AD), Christian pillar-hermit from Sisan, Syria
- Simeon Stylites III, 5th-century pillar-hermit
- Simeon Stylites the Younger (521–597 AD), hermit and pillar-hermit from Antioch
- Simeon, the name of one priest and one deacon martyred with Abda and Abdjesus
- Simeon the Holy Fool, 6th-century Christian saint and hermit
- Simeon I of Bulgaria (866–927), Bulgarian tsar
- Symeon Metaphrastes (10th century?), Byzantine hagiographer
- Symeon the New Theologian (949–1022), Eastern Orthodox saint
- Simeon (abbot) (994–1094), Abbot of Ely Cathedral
- Simeon Seth (fl. 1070), Jewish Byzantine physician, writer, and grand chamberlain from Antioch
- Simeon of Mantua (died 1016), Armenian monk
- Symeon of Durham (died after 1129), English chronicler and monk of Durham Priory
- Stefan Nemanja (1113–1199), canonized as Saint Simeon, Serbian ruler and saint of the Serbian Orthodox Church
- Simeon of Moscow, 14th-century Grand Prince of Moscow
- Simeon Uroš, 14th-century ruler of Epirus and Thessaly
- Simon of Trent, 15th-century boy supposedly killed by Jews, and formerly a martyr of the Catholic Church
- Patriarch Symeon I of Constantinople, or Symeon of Trebizond, reigned three times: 1466, 1471–1475 and 1482–1486
- Simeon Bekbulatovich, de jure Tsar of Russia (1575–1576)
- Symeon of Polotsk (1629–1680), Russian poet, dramatist, churchman, and enlightener

=== Since 1700 ===
Ordered alphabetically by last name.

- Simeon Barrow (born 2002), American football player
- Semyon Belits-Geiman (born 1945), former Soviet Olympic freestyle swimmer
- Simeon Brown (born 1991), New Zealand politician
- Simeon B. Brown (1812–1893), American brigadier general
- Semyon Budyonny (1883–1973), Soviet military commander
- Simeon Cottle (born 2004), American basketball player
- Simeon Coxe (usually known only as Simeon), American musician, singer and synth player of Silver Apples
- Simeon Jocelyn (1799-1879), minister and abolitionist
- Simeon Mangiuca (1831–1890), Austro-Hungarian Romanian folklorist
- Simeon V. Marcelo (born 1953), Filipino lawyer and former Ombudsman and Solicitor-General of the Philippines
- Simeon North (1765–1852), American gunmaker
- Siméon Denis Poisson (1781–1840), French mathematician
- Simeon Rice (born 1974), American football player
- Simeon Woods Richardson (born 2000), American professional baseball player
- Simeon Saxe-Coburg-Gotha (born 1937), Tsar of Bulgaria (1943–1946), prime minister of Bulgaria (2001–2005)
- Semyon Sereda (1871–1933), Soviet politician
- Simeon Solomon (1840-1905), British painter
- Simeon Thomas (born 1993), American football player
- Simeon Tienpont (born 1982), Dutch sailor
- Semyon Varlamov (born 1988), Russian ice hockey player
- Simeon S. Willis (1879–1965), American lawyer, judge, and politician from Kentucky

== See also ==
- Chamoun, also Shimun
- Semion (disambiguation)
- Semen (name)
- Shimun (disambiguation), also Shemon
- Simeon (surname)
- Simon (disambiguation)
- Simone (disambiguation)
- Symon
