= Siim Avi =

Estonian lawyer and elder

Siim Avi (born 22 July 1984 in Tartu, Soviet Union) is an Estonian politician and lawyer. He has mainly served as an elder of different municipalities. From 2011 to 2013 Avi served as the elder of Piirissaare Parish, from 2016 to 2017 Kõpu Parish and from 2018 to 2019 as the elder of Ruhnu Parish. He does not belong to any party but has described himself as a liberal.

Political offices
Preceded by Maria Korotkova	Elder of Piirissaare Parish; 2011–2013	Succeeded by Jelena Umbleja
Preceded by Tõnu Kiviloo	Elder of Kõpu Parish; 2016–2017	Succeeded by Position abolished
Preceded by Jaan Urvet	Elder of Ruhnu Parish; 2018–2019	Succeeded by Andre Nõu
