= San Simeon (disambiguation) =

San Simeon is an unincorporated town in California, and the home of the Hearst Castle landmark and attraction.

San Simeon may also refer to:

- San Simeon (horse), an Australian racehorse
- San Simeon Stakes, a horse race in the United States
- San Simeon State Park, a state park in California
- "San Simeon", a song by the band Goldfinger on the album Stomping Ground
- Rancho San Simeon, a Mexican land grant in present-day San Luis Obispo County, California

== See also ==
- 2003 San Simeon earthquake
