= Simonas =

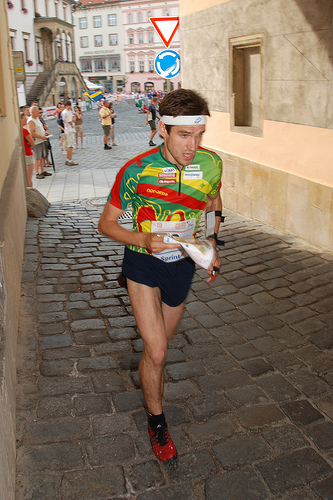
- Simonas Krėpšta
- Gender: Male

Origin
- Region of origin: Lithuania

Other names
- Related names: Simon

Simonas (shortened as Simas) is a Lithuanian masculine given name, a cognate of Simon, and may refer to:

- Simonas Daukantas (1793–1864), Lithuanian writer, ethnographer and historian
- Simonas Glinskis (born 1983), Lithuanian director of photography and cameraman
- Simonas Krėpšta (born 1984), Lithuanian orienteering competitor
- Simonas Martynas Kosakovskis (1741–1794), Polish-Lithuanian nobleman and military commander
- Monsignor Simonas Morkūnas (1902–1997), Lithuanian-born American priest
- Simonas Serapinas (born 1982), Lithuanian professional basketball forward
- Simonas Stanevičius (1799–1848), Lithuanian writer and a nationalist activist
