= Pinda Simão =

Angolan politician

Pinda Simão is an Angolan politician who served as the governor of Uíge Province. He previously served as minister of Education and was a member of the Defense General Assembly.

== Background and career ==
Simão holds a master's degree in Economics and Education Planning. He entered the civil service as a technical staff of the ministry of Education and served as Director in various departments in the ministry from 1981 to 1997. From 1997 to 2010, he was Deputy minister – Education Reform before he was appointed minister of Education in 2010 and served until 2017 when he was appointed the governor of Uíge Province. His governorship tenure ended in 2020.
