= Simaan AbouRizk =

Canadian engineer

Simaan M. AbouRizk is a Canadian engineer, currently the NSERC/Alberta Construction Industry Senior Industrial Research Chair in Construction Engineering and Management and, formerly the Canada Research Chair in Operations Simulation from 2001 to 2008, at University of Alberta.
