= Sīmanis =

Family name

Sīmanis is a Latvian surname (feminine: Sīmane) and masculine given name. Notable people with the surname include:

- Ādolfs Sīmanis (1909–1979), Latvian football player
- Haralds Sīmanis (1951–2022), Latvian singer and composer
