= Fuat Oduncu =

German hematologist, oncologist

Fuat Shamoun Oduncu
- Known for: Oncology, palliative care, medical ethics and health economics
- Awards: Vincenz-Czerny-Prize for Oncology, m4-Award for Personalized Medicine
- Scientific career
- Fields: hematology, oncology, biomedical ethics
- Workplaces: University Hospital LMU Munich

Fuat Shamoun Oduncu (born 1970 in Midyat, Turkey) is a German hematologist, oncologist and biomedical ethicist. He is professor for medicine at LMU Munich and known for his work in the fields of oncology, palliative care, medical ethics and health economics.

== Biography ==
Fuat Shamoun Oduncu was born in Midyat. As Assyrian he belongs to the Christian minority of the Syriac Orthodox Church. His foreign worker family emigrated to Germany in 1974, living in Füssen, Bavaria since. He finished high school in 1989 and studied medicine 1989–95 at the LMU Munich. 1997 he graduated with the medical doctor degree (Dr. med.) at the medical faculty of the LMU. In parallel he graduated with the master's degree of philosophy (M.A.) at the Jesuit's University of Philosophy in Munich in 1996. Later in 2005 he graduated with the degree of doctor of philosophy at the Department of Philosophy of the LMU. He obtained German citizenship in 1998 (prior Turkish citizenship). In 2002 Oduncu completed a postgraduate European Master in Bioethics (E.M.B.) at the universities of Nijmegen, Madrid, Leuven and Padova. In 2005 he received his Ph.D. (German Habilitation) in internal medicine at the medical faculty of the LMU Munich. In 2004 he was approved as internist, 2005 as hematologist and medical oncologist. In 2007 he became the head of the department of hematology and oncology (Medizinische Klinik und Poliklinik IV, Klinikum der Universität Munich). In 2009 he received his additional certifications for palliative care and for hemostaseology, and for medical quality management in 2012. In 2011 Oduncu completed a two-year part-time Master of Business Administration Health Care Management (M.B.A. HCM) at the Munich Business School in cooperation with the Boston University School of Management. In 2013 he was appointed professor at the LMU Munich.

As the general secretary of the Erich-Franck-Society Oduncu promoted the relationship between the medical faculties of the LMU Munich and the University of Istanbul. He supported an exchange program (Erasmus Programme) for students and university teachers. As a member of the charity foundation Christlicher Entwicklungsdienst and as a VSO worker Oduncu assists in foreign aid in the poorest regions of India and Africa (e.g. building of elementary and secondary schools and of homes for the poor).

== Scientific contribution ==
Oduncu's scientific goal is to contribute to the development of innovative drugs on the basis of antibody technologies in search of a curative treatment for cancer.

Oduncu, together with his research partners (Georg Fey, Karl-Peter Hopfner), puts efforts on the development of the so-called bi- and trispecific antibodies, i.e. the triplebodies. These molecules present antibody-derivatives and small molecules which specifically bind to the surface antigens of cancer cells and to CD16- or CD3-positive effector cells of the patient. Through this concept of dual targeting the triplebodies are able to specifically identify the tumor cell by binding to two different surface antigens of the same tumor cell and kill the tumor through the stimulation of effector cells.

Dual targeting provides selective binding and selective killing of the cancer cells, thus leading to high rates of efficacy and very low rates of adverse effects. Thus, the use of triplebody technology with dual targeting provides a considerable potential for a successful personalized cancer therapy with the realistic chance of long-term efficacy and cure for cancer patients. The research team of Oduncu established the concept of dual targeting using triplebodies first for the in-vitro treatment of leukemia.

Oduncu contributed as a medical ethicist a vast publication body dealing with central ethical and societal issues of the following topics such as dying in dignity, euthanasia, assisted-suicide, palliative care, priority-setting in health care, organ transplantation, and embryo and stem cell research.

== Publications ==
- Publication list ResearchGate
- Publication list PubMed
- Publication list: Clinic of the LMU

== Awards ==
- 1990–1996 Scholarship by the German National Academic Foundation, Bonn
- 1995 Award of the International Electrophoresis Conference, Paris
- 1996 Award of the International Conference on Malignant Lymphomas, Lugano
- 1996 Theodor-Fontane-Award of the German National Academic Foundation, Bonn
- 1998 Ethics-Prize of the Deutsches Allgemeines Sonntagsblatt
- 1999–2000 Grant for Research and Education (FöFoLe) at the Medical Faculty of the LMU Munich
- 2000–2001 Fellowship for European Postgraduate Study European Master in Bioethics (E.M.B.) at the universities of Nijmegen, Madrid, Leuven and Padua
- 2001 Walter-Brendel-Transplantation Award of the German Society for Transplantation, Hannover
- 2002 Grant by theGeschwister Boehringer Ingelheim Stiftung für Geisteswissenschaften
- 2005 Vincenz-Czerny-Prize for Oncology of the German Society for Hematology and Medical Oncology (DGHO)
- 2008–2011 Grant for the MBA Health Care study at the Munich Business School
- 2011 m4-Award for Personalized Medicine (excellence cluster grant by the Federal Ministry of Education and Research and the Bavarian Ministry of Economy)
- 2021 Cross of the Order of Merit of the Federal Republic of Germany
