= Simon Jackson (playwright) =

British playwright, filmmaker and poet

- Born: Manchester
- Education: University of Edinburgh
- Occupations: Playwright, filmmaker and poet Director of Living Arts Space Theatre Company, Manchester 1992 - 1995

Simon Jackson is a British playwright, filmmaker and poet, born in Manchester, UK. His plays deal with themes of redemptive love, the trauma of creation and the peeling back of layers to reveal the truth. The plays often exist in a dream like space between reality and fantasy and are characterised by poetic language and rich imagery.

== Life ==
Born in Manchester, Jackson studied Literature and Commercial Art at North Carolina State University in Raleigh, USA and Drama at Manchester University. He later graduated with an MA (Distinction) in Textual Analysis and Creative Writing at the University of Edinburgh.

He was director of Living Arts Space Theatre Company, Manchester, from 1992 until 1995. He co-wrote a series of training films for Reuters International and a series of radio plays for French children learning English then left to teach in Eastern Europe, North Africa and South America. In 1998 he became the academic advisor to Heinemann/Macmillan, for Peru and was Head of Drama at Newton International College, Lima from 1998 to 2001.

== Theatre ==
Jackson has had more than 20 plays performed.

=== Selected plays ===
- Turning to the Camera (2011) Siege Perilous Theatre, Edinburgh. The Guardian's Pick of the Week for Scottish theatre, 26 November 2011. Turning to the Camera is 'tightly-plotted with just the right number of twists and turns... a sharply-focused and well-developed thriller, it is certainly an impressive showcase for (Jackson's) talents' Edinburgh Spotlight Published by The Play Depot, ISBN 978-1-926849-10-2
- The Rose Garden (2009), published by The Play Depot, ISBN 978-1-894910-93-4, shortlisted for The Eileen Eckhart Award 2009 (Canada) and The Diana Raffles New Theatre Publications Award 2010 (UK). Broadcast on Phonic FM’s Radio Hour 24 March 2011.
- Beginning of a Great Adventure (2009) – winner of the Audience Award for Best Play, Cambridge Monologue and Duologue Festival 2009, performed at the Cambridge Hotbed festival
- The Algebra of Attraction (2004) performed at Teatro Peruano-Britanico, Lima, Peru to celebrate British-Peruvian co-operation
- Tantrum! (1995), Living Arts Space Theatre Company, Gateway Theatre, Chester and touring. Shortlisted for the Buxton Festival Fringe Best New Play and Best Comedy Awards, 1995
- The Lift – winner of Understanding Magazine's Edinburgh Fringe New Drama Award, 1995
- Reflections of Moonlight on Moving Water (1994), Contact Theatre Company, Manchester, Winner of the British Gas Young Playwrights' Award 1994
- Frankenstein – the Monster's Story (1994), Theatre of Fire – written with Theatre of Fire and the Irish band, Illywhacker, as a spectacular outdoor performance involving pyrotechnics, circus performers and live music. It headlined the theatre bill for Glastonbury 1994 and then toured outdoor venues and festivals in Northern Europe for two years.

== Poetry and short stories ==
Jackson’s poetry and short stories have been translated into Dutch, French, Japanese, Serbian and Spanish and widely published in anthologies and literary magazines in Britain and overseas

He has been the winner of several literary competitions, including the Malton Literature Festival Poetry Award 2011, Ware Poets Sonnet Prize 2011, Segora Poetry Prize 2010/11, The Writers Bureau Poetry Competition 2010, Grace Dieux Writers' Prize 2009 and Tyne Valley Writers Open Poetry Competition in 1997. He was the judge for the Grace Dieu Award 2010.

A collection entitled Fragile Cargo will be published by BeWrite Publishing in spring 2012.

== Film ==
In the 1990s Jackson co-wrote a series of training films for Reuters International with Reuters Training Editor, George Short. Since then he has specialised in short films, often using stop motion animation, winning the Special Jury Award in Cameo Cinema's Love is Hell festival (2007) and both the Audience Award and Best Screenplay Award in Edinburgh's 48 Hour Film Festival. Jackson composes the music for all his films and radio plays and won Best Soundtrack in Edinburgh's 2011 48 Hour Film Festival.

Other short films include work for Billy Bragg's Jail Guitar Doors charity and collaborations with Get Cape. Wear Cape. Fly and with Scottish poets and artists Brian McCabe, Andrew Greig, Ali Hayes and Aonghas MacNeacail, shown by the BBC, at the UN Climate Change Conference in Mexico and at Film and Literary Festivals around the world.

He was invited to write a series of treatments for Transporter 2 (2004) by Jason Statham. Although the treatments were not used he has recently finished a full length screenplay for a new Statham project.
