= Simeon Stylites III =

Pillar hermit

Saint Simeon Stylites III
- Venerated in: Eastern Orthodox Church; Coptic Orthodox Church

Simeon Stylites III was a pillar hermit bearing the same name as Simeon Stylites and Simeon Stylites the Younger.

He is honoured by both the Greek Orthodox Church and the Coptic Orthodox Church. He is hence believed to have lived in the fifth century before the breach which occurred between these Churches. However, very little certain is known of him. He is believed to have been struck by lightning upon his pillar, built near Hegca in Cilicia, in Turkey.
