= Simeon Stylites =

Syrian Christian ascetic (c. 390 – 459)

Saint Simeon Stylites
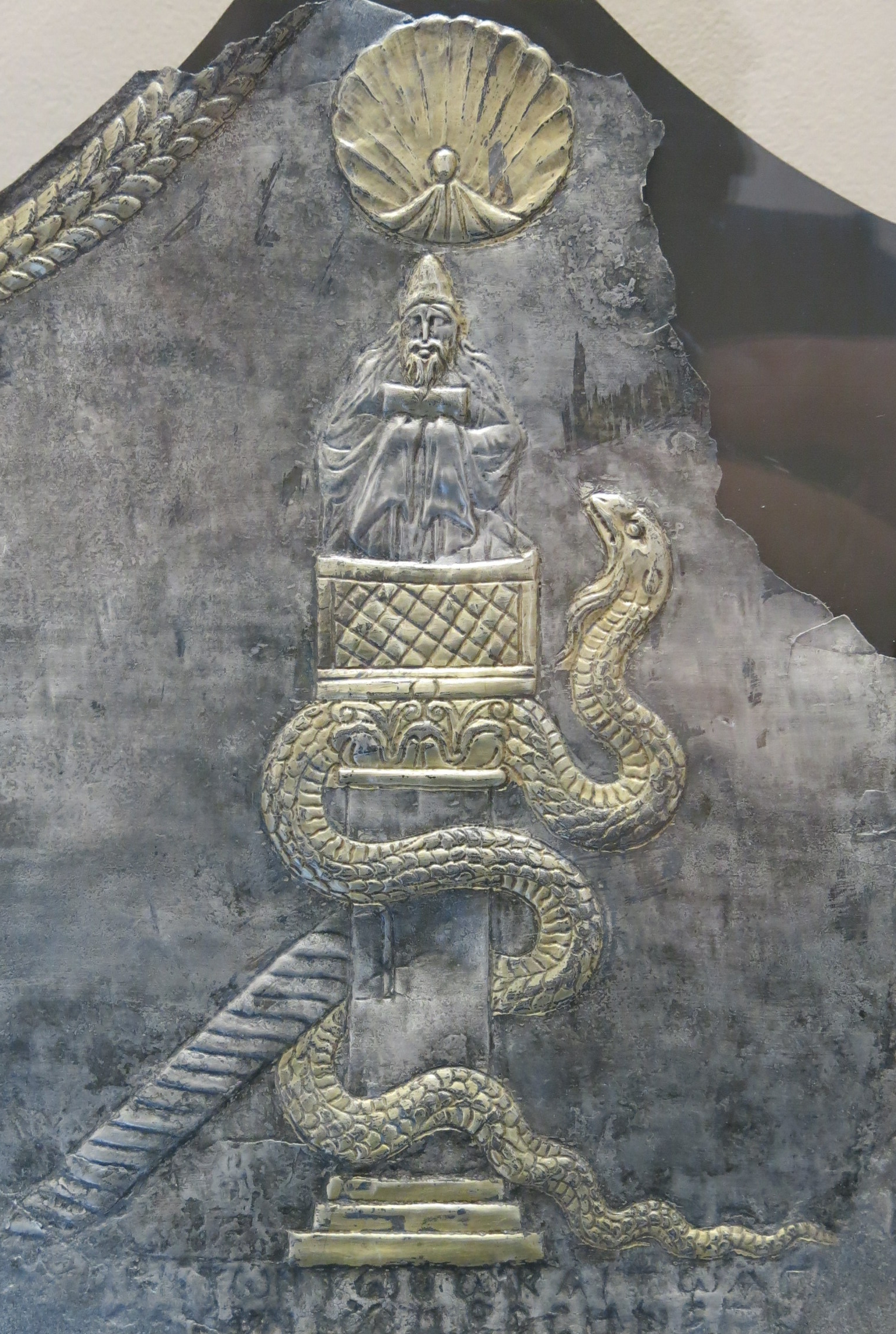
- 6th century depiction of Simeon on his column. A scallop shell symbolizing spiritual purity blesses Simeon; the serpent represents demonic temptations (Louvre).

Venerable Father
- Born: c. 390; Sis, Cilicia, Eastern Roman Empire
- Died: 2 September 459 (aged 68–69); Qalaat Semaan, Byzantine Syria (between Aleppo and Antioch)
- Venerated in: Oriental Orthodox Church; Eastern Orthodox Church; Catholic Church; Anglican Communion
- Canonized: Pre-congregation
- Feast: 1 September (Eastern Orthodox Church); 29 Pashons (Coptic Orthodox Church); 5 January (Western Christianity); 27 July (Syriac Orthodox Church); Monday after second Sunday of the Exaltation of the Cross (Armenian Apostolic Church)
- Attributes: Clothed as a monk in monastic habit, shown standing on top of his pillar

Simeon Stylites or Symeon the Stylite (Note: Classical Syriac: ܫܡܥܘܢ ܕܐܣܛܘܢܐ šamʻun dasṯonáyá, Koine Greek Συμεὼν ὁ Στυλίτης Symeón ho Stylítes, Arabic: سمعان العمودي Simʿān al-ʿAmūdī) (Greek: Συμεών ό Στυλίτης; Syriac: ܫܡܥܘܢ ܕܐܣܛܘܢܐ, romanized: Šimʕun dʼAstˁonā; Arabic: سمعان العمودي, romanized: Simʿān al-ʿAmūdī c. 390 – 2 September 459) was a Syrian Christian ascetic who achieved notability by living 36 years on top of a pillar near Aleppo (in modern Syria). Several other stylites later followed his model (the Greek word style means "pillar"). Simeon is venerated as a saint in the Catholic Church, Oriental Orthodox Churches, and the Eastern Orthodox Church. He is known formally as Simeon Stylites the Elder to distinguish him from Simeon Stylites the Younger, Simeon Stylites III and Symeon Stylites of Lesbos.

== Sources ==
Three major early biographies of Simeon exist. The first of these is by Theodoret, bishop of Cyrrhus, in his work Religious History. This biography was written during Simeon's lifetime. Theodoret relates several events of which he claims to be an eyewitness. The narrator of a second biography names himself as Antonius, a disciple of Simeon's. This work is of unknown date and provenance. The third is a Syriac source, which dates to 473. This is the longest of the three and the most effusive in its praise of Simeon. It places Simeon on a par with the Old Testament prophets, portraying him as a founder of the Christian Church. The three sources exhibit signs of independent development; although they each follow the same rough outline, they have hardly any narrative episodes in common. All three sources have been translated into English by Robert Doran. The Syriac life has also been translated by Frederick Lent.

The traditional consensus is that Simeon Stylites adhered to Chalcedonian Christianity, with Syriac letters claiming that he was a Monophysite being viewed as forgeries.

== Life ==
=== Early life ===
The son of a shepherd, Simeon was born and raised in Sis, which was then a part of the Eastern Roman province of Cilicia. According to Theodoret, Simeon developed a zeal for Christianity at the age of 13, following a reading of the Beatitudes. He entered a monastery before the age of 16. From the first day, he gave himself up to the practice of an austerity so extreme that his brethren judged him to be unsuited to any form of community life. They asked Simeon to leave the monastery.

Simeon shut himself up in a hut for one and a half years, where he passed the whole of Lent without eating or drinking. When he emerged from the hut, his achievement was hailed as a miracle. He later took to standing continually upright so long as his limbs would sustain him.

After one and a half years in his hut, Simeon sought a rocky eminence on the slopes of what is now the Sheik Barakat Mountain, part of Mount Simeon. He chose to live within a narrow space, less than 20 meters (66 ft) in diameter. But crowds of pilgrims invaded the area to seek him out, asking his counsel or his prayers, and leaving him insufficient time for his own devotions. This eventually led him to adopt a new way of life.

=== Atop the pillar ===
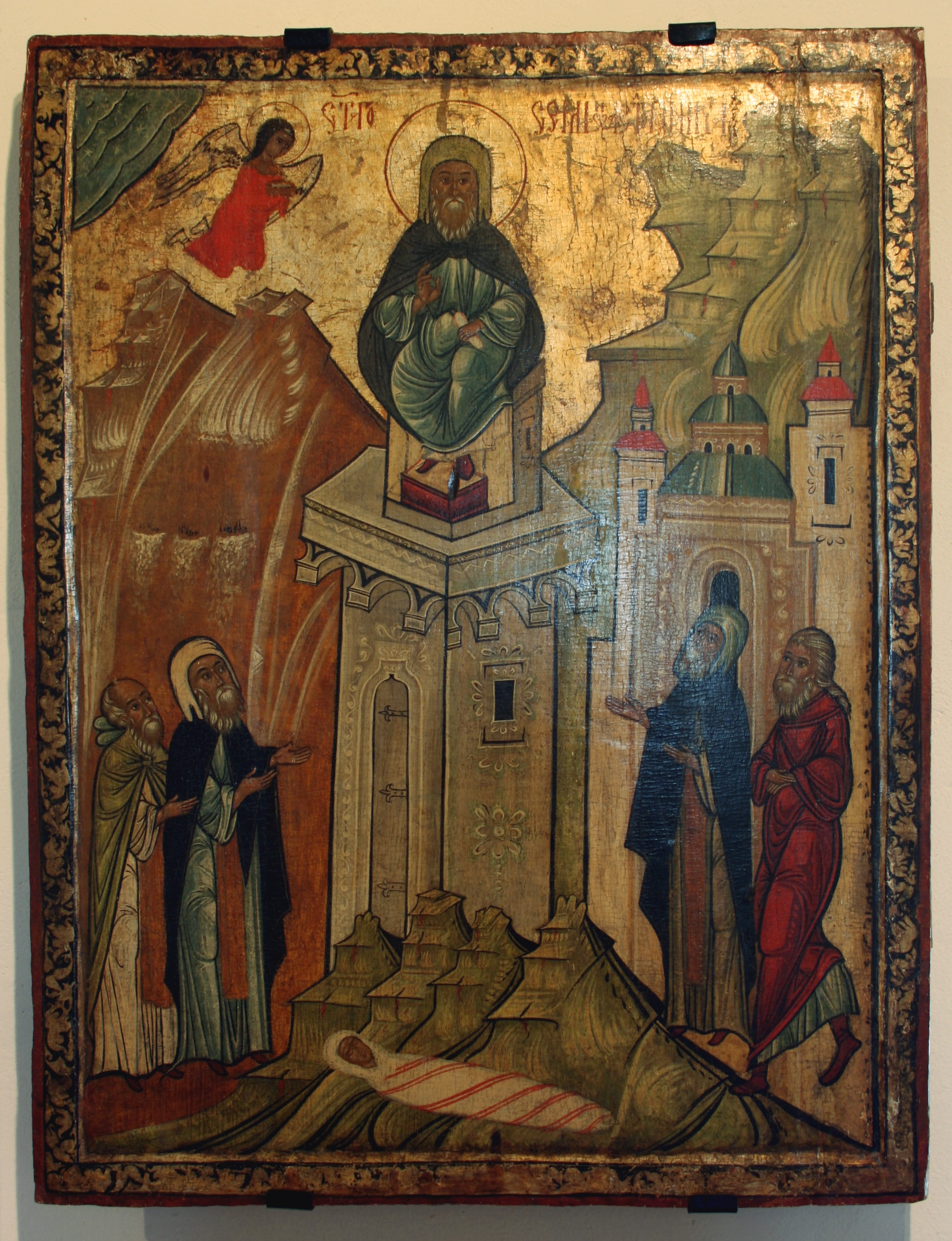
Sixteenth century icon of Simeon Stylites. At the base of the pillar is his mother's body. (Historic Museum in Sanok, Poland)

In order to get away from the ever-increasing number of people who came to him for prayers and advice, leaving him little if any time for his private austerities, Simeon discovered a pillar which had survived among ruins in nearby Telanissa (modern-day Taladah in Syria) and began occupying it.

When the monastic Elders living in the desert heard about Simeon, who had chosen a new and strange form of asceticism, they wanted to test him to determine whether his extreme feats were founded in humility or pride. They decided to order Simeon under obedience to come down from the pillar. They decided that if he disobeyed, they would forcibly drag him to the ground, but if he was willing to submit, they were to leave him on his pillar. Simeon displayed complete obedience and humility, and the monks told him to stay where he was.

The first pillar that Simeon occupied was little more than 3 meters (10 ft). He later moved his platform to others, the last in the series reportedly more than 15 meters (50 ft) from the ground. At the top of the pillar was a platform, which is believed to have been about one square meter and surrounded by a baluster.

Edward Gibbon in his History of the Decline and Fall of the Roman Empire describes Simeon's life as follows:

In this last and lofty station, the Syrian Anachoret resisted the heat of thirty summers and the cold of as many winters. Habit and exercise instructed him to maintain his dangerous situation without fear or giddiness, and successively to assume the different postures of devotion. He sometimes prayed in an erect attitude, with his outstretched arms in the figure of a cross, but his most familiar practice was that of bending his meagre skeleton from the forehead to the feet; and a curious spectator, after numbering twelve hundred and forty-four repetitions, at length desisted from the endless account. The progress of an ulcer in his thigh might shorten, but it could not disturb this celestial life; and the patient Hermit expired, without descending from his column.

Even on the highest of his columns, Simeon was not withdrawn from the world. If anything, the new pillar attracted even more people, both pilgrims who had earlier visited him and sightseers as well. Simeon was available each afternoon to talk with visitors. By means of a ladder, visitors were able to ascend within speaking distance. It is known that he wrote letters, the text of some of which have survived to this day, that he instructed disciples, and that he also lectured to those assembled beneath. He especially preached against profanity and usury. In contrast to the extreme austerity that he practiced, his preaching conveyed temperance and compassion and was marked with common sense and freedom from fanaticism.

Much of Simeon's public ministry, like that of other Syrian ascetics, can be seen as socially cohesive in the context of the Roman East. In the face of the withdrawal of wealthy landowners to the large cities, holy men such as Simeon acted as impartial and necessary patrons and arbiters in disputes between peasant farmers and within the smaller towns.

=== Fame and final years ===
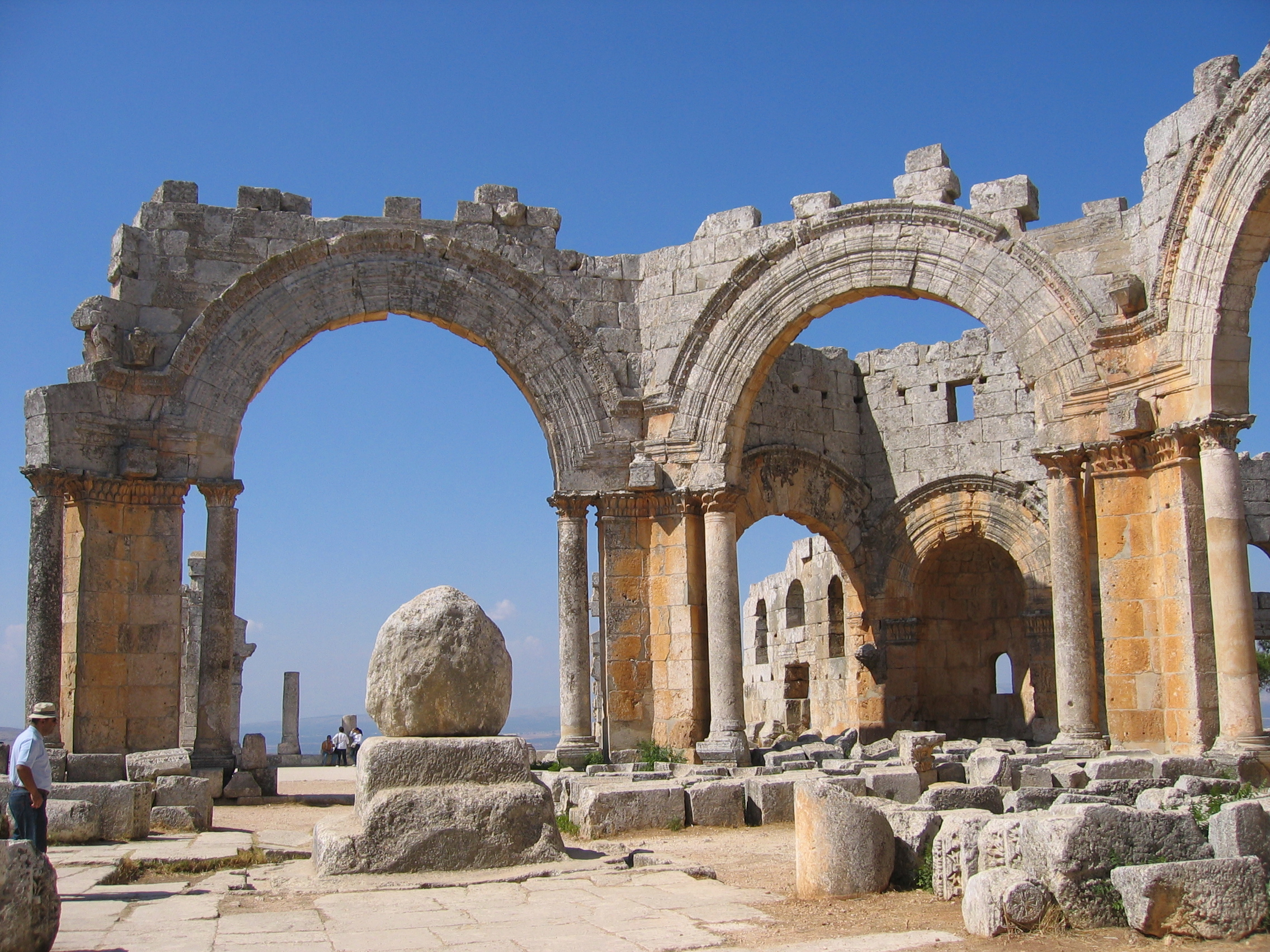
Ruins of the Church of Saint Simeon Stylites with remains of his column (centre, now topped with a boulder)

Reports of Simeon reached the church hierarchy and the imperial court. The Emperor Theodosius II and his wife Aelia Eudocia greatly respected Simeon and listened to his counsels, while the Emperor Leo I paid respectful attention to a letter he sent in favour of the Council of Chalcedon. Simeon is also said to have corresponded with Genevieve of Paris.

Patriarch Domninos II (441–448) of Antioch visited the monk and celebrated the Divine Liturgy on the pillar.

Evagrius Scholasticus records an instance in which Simeon denounced the emperor's prefect Asclepiodotus to Emperor Theodosius for supposedly encouraging pagans and Jews and undermining Christians. Theodosius then fired Asclepiodotus.

Once when Simeon was ill, Theodosius sent three bishops to beg him to come down and allow himself to be attended by physicians, but Simeon preferred to leave his cure in the hands of God, and before long he recovered.

A double wall was raised around him to keep the crowd of people from coming too close and disturbing his prayerful concentration. Women were, in general, not permitted beyond the wall, not even his own mother, whom he reportedly told, "If we are worthy, we shall see one another in the life to come." She submitted to this, remaining in the area, and embraced the monastic life of silence and prayer. When she died, Simeon asked that her coffin be brought to him, and he reverently bade farewell to his dead mother.

Accounts differ with regard to how long Simeon lived upon the pillar, with estimates ranging from 35 to 42 years. He died on 2 September 459. A disciple found his body stooped over in prayer. The Patriarch of Antioch, Martyrius, performed the funeral of the monk before a huge crowd. He was buried not far from the pillar.

== Legacy ==
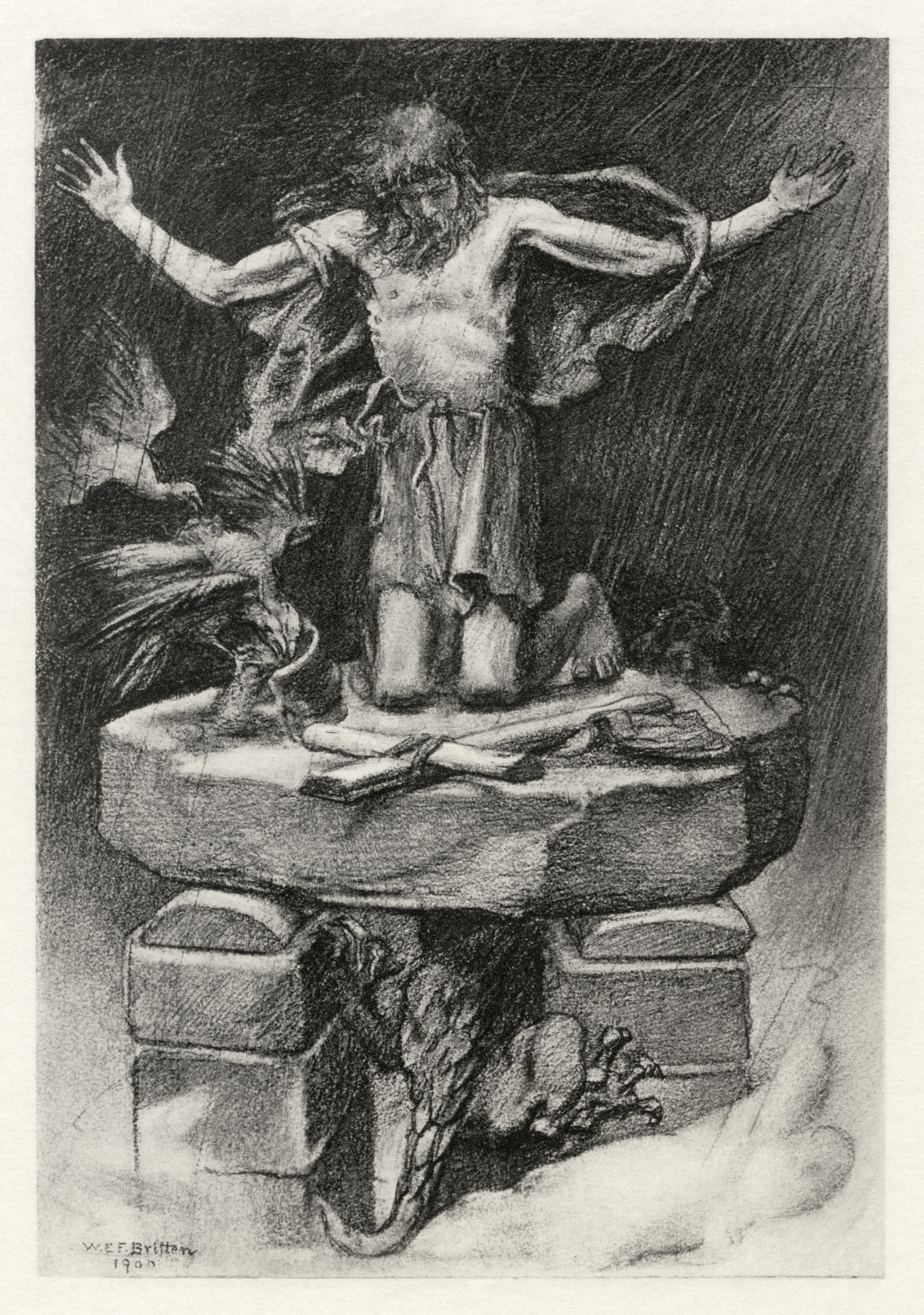
A 1901 illustration by W. E. F. Britten for Alfred Tennyson's St. Simeon Stylites.

Simeon inspired many imitators. For the next century, ascetics living on pillars, stylites, were a common sight throughout the Christian Levant.

He is commemorated as a saint in the Coptic Orthodox Church, where his feast is on 29 Pashons. He is commemorated 1 September by the Eastern Orthodox and Eastern Catholic Churches, and 5 January in the Roman Catholic Church.

A contest arose between Antioch and Constantinople for the possession of Simeon's remains. The preference was given to Antioch, and the greater part of his relics were left there as a protection to the unwalled city. Pilgrim tokens for Simeon Stylites have been found across the Byzantine Empire, attesting to the popularity of his veneration.

The ruins of the vast edifice erected in his honour and known in Arabic as the Qalaat Semaan ("the Fortress of Simeon") can still be seen. They are located about 30 km northwest of Aleppo (36°20′03″N 36°50′38″E) and consist of four basilicas built out from an octagonal court towards the four points of the compass to form a large cross. In the centre of the court stands the base of the style or column on which Simeon stood. On 12 May 2016, the pillar within the church reportedly took a hit from a missile, fired from what appeared to be Russian jets backing the Syrian government.

=== Cultural references ===
The life of Simeon Stylites inspired an 1842 poem by Alfred Tennyson, "St. Simeon Stylites". Modern works based upon the life of the saint include Luis Buñuel's 1965 film Simón del desierto, Hans Zender's 1986 opera Stephen Climax and the 1998 film At Sachem Farm.

James Hamilton-Paterson's Gerontius, a work of fiction based on Sir Edward Elgar's actual voyage to Brazil in 1923, includes a dream sequence in which the acolyte Rahut charges "dreamers" a fee to be allowed to ascend to the top of the pillar for a conversation with the ascetic. Awe mingles with horror as the visitor's "head sinks to the level of a pair of monstrous feet from whose rotting toes curl yellow nails."

Simeon Stylites is the eponymous persona in James Harpur's poem, "Symeon Stylites" in his book The Dark Age. The poem also appeared in Italian translation (San Simeone Stilita, trans. Francesca Diano).

== See also ==
- Desert Fathers
- Flagpole sitter
- Our Lady of the Pillar
