= Jamaican Patois =

English-based creole spoken in Jamaica

- Patwa, Jamiekan / Jamiekan Kriyuol, Jumiekan / Jumiekan Kryuol / Jumieka Taak / Jumieka taak / Jumiekan languij
- Native to: Jamaica
- Region: Greater Antilles
- Ethnicity: Afro-Jamaicans
- Native speakers: (3.2 million cited 2000–2001)
- Language family: English-African creole: Guinea Coast Creole English; Caribbean English Creole; Western Caribbean; Jamaicanic; Jamaican Patois
- Dialects: San Andrés–Providencia Creole; Limonese Creole; Iyaric; Bocas del Toro Creole; Belizean Creole; Bermudian Creole; Miskito Coast Creole
- Writing system: Latin (Cassidy/JLU orthography)

Language codes
- ISO 639-3: jam
- Glottolog: jama1262
- ELP: NE
- Linguasphere: 52-ABB-am

Female patois speaker saying two sentences

A Jamaican Patois speaker discussing the usage of the language in English

Jamaican Patois (/ˈpætwɑː/; locally rendered Jumiekan Patwah or Patwa and called Jamaican Creole by linguists (Note: In linguistics, a patois is the vernacular that develops amongst the first set of inhabitants from diverse backgrounds in a new locale. A creole is the vernacular that develops amongst subsequent generations from that same milieu.)) is a Caribbean English-based creole language with substantial admixture from predominantly West African languages, and some forms of Arawak, Spanish, French and other languages, spoken primarily in Jamaica and among the Jamaican diaspora. Words or slang from Jamaican Patois can be heard in other Caribbean countries, the United Kingdom (especially in London, where it has heavily influenced Multicultural London English), New York City and Miami in the United States, and Toronto, Canada. It is spoken by most Jamaicans as their first language.

Patois developed in the 17th century when enslaved people from West and Central Africa were exposed to, learned, and nativised the vernacular and dialectal languages spoken by the slaveholders and overseers: British English, Hiberno-English and Scots. Jamaican Creole exists in gradations between more conservative creole forms that are not significantly mutually intelligible with English, and forms virtually identical to Standard English.

Jamaicans refer to their language as Patois, a term also used as a lower-case noun as a multi-use description of pidgins, creoles, dialects, and vernaculars worldwide. Creoles, including Jamaican Patois, are often stigmatised as low-prestige languages even when spoken as the mother tongue by most of the local population. Jamaican pronunciation and vocabulary are significantly different from English despite heavy use of English words or derivatives.

Significant Jamaican Patois-speaking communities exist among Jamaican expatriates and non-Jamaicans in South Florida, New York City, Hartford, Connecticut, Washington, D.C., coastal Latin America, the Cayman Islands, Toronto, London, Birmingham, Manchester, and Nottingham. The Cayman Islands in particular have a large Jamaican Patois-speaking community, with 16.4% of the population using it. Mutually intelligible variations are found in San Andrés y Providencia Islands, Colombia, Limón Province, Costa Rica, Colón Province and Bocas del Toro Province, Panama, the Miskito Coast of Honduras and Nicaragua, and Belize— brought by enslaved and emancipated Afro-Jamaicans, Creole Jamaicans and Jewish-Jamaican merchants, as well as, labourers who migrated to work in agriculture (mainly banana production and lumbering), and later to build the Panama Canal, railroads and ports, between the mid-17th and 20th centuries. Mesolectal forms are similar to very basilectal Belizean Kriol.

Jamaican Patois exists mainly as a spoken language and is also heavily used for musical purposes, especially in mento, reggae and dancehall as well as other genres. Although standard British English is used for most writing in Jamaica, Jamaican Patois has gained ground as a literary language for almost a hundred years. Claude McKay published his book of Jamaican poems Songs of Jamaica in 1912. Patois and English are frequently used for stylistic contrast (codeswitching) in forms of Internet writing.

== Phonology ==
Accounts of basilectal Jamaican Patois (that is, its most divergent rural varieties) suggest around 21 phonemic consonants with an additional phoneme (/h/) in the Western dialect. There are between nine and sixteen vowels. Some vowels are capable of nasalisation and others can be lengthened.

Consonants
	Labial		Alveolar		Post- alveolar		Palatal^{2}		Velar		Glottal
Nasal		m		n				(ɲ)^{2}		ŋ	
Stop	p	b	t	d	tʃ	dʒ	(c)	(ɟ)^{2}	k	ɡ	
Fricative	f	v	s	z	ʃ	(ʒ)					(h)^{1}
Approximant /Lateral				ɹ				j		w	
Approximant /Lateral				l							

^1 The status of /h/ as a phoneme is dialectal: in western varieties, it is a full phoneme and there are minimal pairs (/hiit/ 'hit' and /iit/ 'eat'); in central and eastern varieties, vowel-initial words take an initial [h] after vowel-final words, preventing the two vowels from falling together, so that the words for 'hand' and 'and' (both underlyingly /an/) may be pronounced [han] or [an].
^2 The palatal stops [c], [ɟ] (Note: Also transcribed as [kʲ] and [ɡʲ].) and [ɲ] are considered phonemic by some accounts and phonetic by others. For the latter interpretation, their appearance is included in the larger phenomenon of phonetic palatalisation.

Examples of palatalisation include:

- /kiuu/ → [ciuː] → [cuː] ('a quarter quart (of rum)')
- /ɡiaad/ → [ɟiaːd] → [ɟaːd] ('guard')
- /piaa + piaa/ → [pʲiãːpʲiãː] → [pʲãːpʲãː] ('weak')

Voiced stops are implosive whenever in the onset of prominent syllables (especially word-initially) so that /biit/ ('beat') is pronounced [ɓiːt] and /ɡuud/ ('good') as [ɠuːd].

Before a syllabic /l/, the contrast between alveolar and velar consonants has been historically neutralised with alveolar consonants becoming velar so that the word for 'bottle' is /bakl̩/ and the word for 'idle' is /aiɡl̩/.

Vowels of Jamaican Patois. from Harry (2006:128)

Jamaican Patois exhibits two types of vowel harmony; peripheral vowel harmony, wherein only sequences of peripheral vowels (that is, /i/, /u/, and /a/) can occur within a syllable; and back harmony, wherein /i/ and /u/ cannot occur within a syllable together (that is, /uu/ and /ii/ are allowed but * /ui/ and * /iu/ are not). These two phenomena account for three long vowels and four diphthongs:

Vowel	Example	Gloss
/ii/	/biini/	'tiny'
/aa/	/baaba/	'barber'
/uu/	/buut/	'booth'
/ia/	/biak/	'bake'
/ai/	/baik/	'bike'
/ua/	/buat/	'boat'
/au/	/taun/	'town'

== Sociolinguistic variation ==
Jamaican Patois features a creole continuum (or a linguistic continuum): the variety of the language closest to the lexifier language (the acrolect) cannot be distinguished systematically from intermediate varieties (collectively referred to as the mesolect) or even from the most divergent rural varieties (collectively referred to as the basilect). This situation came about with contact between speakers of a number of Niger–Congo languages and various dialects of English, the latter of which were all perceived as prestigious and whose use carried socio-economic benefits. The span of a speaker's command of the continuum generally corresponds to social context.

== Grammar ==
The tense/aspect system of Jamaican Patois is fundamentally unlike that of English. There are no morphologically marked past participles; instead, two different participle words exist: en and a. These are not verbs, but rather invariant particles that cannot stand alone (like the English to be). Their function also differs from those of English: en is a tense indicator and a is an aspect marker.

According to Bailey (1966), the progressive category is marked by /a~da~de/. Alleyne (1980) claims that /a~da/ marks the progressive and that the habitual aspect is unmarked but by its accompaniment with words such as "always", "usually", etc. (i.e. is absent as a grammatical category). Mufwene (1984) and Gibson and Levy (1984) propose a past-only habitual category marked by /juusta/ as in /weɹ wi juusta liv iz not az kual az iiɹ/ ('where we used to live is not as cold as here').

For the present tense, an uninflected verb combining with an iterative adverb marks habitual meaning as in /tam aawez nua wen kieti tel pan im/ ('Tom always knows when Katy tells/has told about him').

For the future tense, (a) go is used to indicate the future.

Jamaican Patois Example		English Translation
Standard	Phonemic	English Translation
Mi run	/mi ɹon/	I run (habitually); I ran
Mi a run, Mi de run	/mi a ɹon/, /mi de ɹon/	I am running
A run mi did a run	/a ɹon mi dida ɹon/ or /a ɹon mi ben(w)en a ɹon/	I was running
Mi did run	/mi did ɹon/ or /mi ben(w)en ɹon/	I have run; I had run
Mi a go run	/mi a ɡo ɹon/	I am going to run; I will go on a run

As in other Caribbean Creoles (that is, Guyanese Creole and San Andrés-Providencia Creole; Sranan Tongo is excluded) /fi/ has a number of functions, including:

Grammatical Category	Function	Jamaican Patois Example		English Translation
Grammatical Category	Function	Standard	Phonemic	English Translation
Preposition	Directional, dative, or benefactive	Dem a fight fi wi	/dem a fait fi wi/	They are fighting for us
Preposition	Genitive	Dat a fi mi book	/dat a fi mi buk/	That's my book
Modal auxiliary	Expressing obligation or futurity	Him fi kom up ya	/im fi kom op ja/	He ought to come up here
Complementiser	Pre-infinitive	Unu haffi kiip sumting far di guinea people-dem fi biit dem muzik	/unu hafi kiip samtiŋ faɹ de ɡini piipl-dem fi biit dem miuzik/	You have to contribute something to the Guinean People for playing their music

=== Pronominal system ===
The pronominal system of Standard English has a four-way distinction of person, number, gender and case. Some varieties of Jamaican Patois do not have the gender or case distinction, but all varieties distinguish between the second person singular and plural (you).

Jamaican Patois Pronoun	Grammatical number	Grammatical person	Grammatical gender	English Translation
Phonemic	Grammatical number	Grammatical person	Grammatical gender	English Translation
/mi/	singular	first-person	neuter	I, me
/ju/	singular	second-person	neuter	You (singular)
/im/	singular	third-person	neuter	They, them (singular)
/im/	singular	third-person	masculine	He, him
/ʃi/	singular	third-person	feminine	She, her
/wi/	plural	first-person	neuter	We, us, our
/unu/	plural	second-person	neuter	You (plural)
/dem/	plural	third-person	neuter	They, them, their
Note: In basilect varieties, /im/ is pronounced [ĩ] and has no gender distinction.

=== Copula ===
- the Jamaican Patois equative verb is also a
  - e.g. /mi a di tiitʃa/ ('I am the teacher')
- Jamaican Patois has a separate locative verb deh
  - e.g. /wi de a london/ or /wi de inna london/ ('we are in London')
- with true adjectives in Jamaican Patois, no copula is needed
  - e.g. /mi haadbak nau/ ('I am old now')

This is akin to Spanish in that both have two distinct forms of the verb "to be" – ser and estar – in which ser is equative and estar is locative. Other languages, such as Portuguese and Italian, make a similar distinction.

=== Negation ===
- /no/ is used as a present tense negator:
  - /if kau no did nua au im tɹuatual tan im udn tʃaans pieɹsiid/ ('If the cow knew that his throat wasn't capable of swallowing a pear seed, he wouldn't have swallowed it')
- /kiaan/ is used in the same way as English can't
  - /it a puaɹ tiŋ dat kiaan maʃ ant/ ('It is a poor thing that can't mash an ant')
- /neva/ is a negative past participle.
  - /dʒan neva tiif di moni/ ('John did not steal the money')

== Orthography ==
Patois has long been written with various respellings compared to English so that, for example, the word "there" might be written ⟨de⟩, ⟨deh⟩, or ⟨dere⟩, and the word "three" as ⟨tree⟩, ⟨tri⟩, or ⟨trii⟩. Standard English spelling is often used and a nonstandard spelling sometimes becomes widespread even though it is neither phonetic nor standard (e.g. ⟨pickney⟩ for /pikni/, 'child').

In 2002, the Jamaican Language Unit was set up at the University of the West Indies at Mona to begin standardising the language, with the aim of supporting non-English-speaking Jamaicans according to their constitutional guarantees of equal rights, as services of the state are normally provided in English, which a significant portion of the population cannot speak fluently. The vast majority of such persons are speakers of Jamaican Patois. It was argued that failure to provide services of the state in a language in such general use or discriminatory treatment by officers of the state based on the inability of a citizen to use English violates the rights of citizens. The proposal was made that freedom from discrimination on the ground of language be inserted into the Charter of Rights. They standardised the Jamaican alphabet as follows:

Short vowels
Letter	Patois	English
i	sik	sick
e	bel	bell
a	ban	band
o	kot	cut
u	kuk	cook

Long vowels
IPA	Letter	Patois	English
[iː]	ii	tii	tea
[aː]	aa	baal	ball
[uː]	uu	shuut	shoot

Diphthongs
IPA	Letter	Patois	English
/ia/	ie	kiek	cake
/ua/	uo	gruo	grow
/ai/	ai	bait	bite
/au/	ou	kou	cow

Nasal vowels are written with -hn, as in kyaahn (can't) and iihn (isn't it?)

Consonants
Letter	Patois	English
b	biek	bake
d	daag	dog
ch	choch	church
f	fuud	food
g	guot	goat
h	hen	hen
j	joj	judge
k	kait	kite
l	liin	lean
m	man	man
n	nais	nice
ng	sing	sing
p	piil	peel
r	ron	run
s	sik	sick
sh	shout	shout
t	tuu	two
v	vuot	vote
w	wail	wild
y	yong	young
z	zuu	zoo
zh	vorzhan	version

h is written according to local pronunciation, so that hen (hen) and en (end) are distinguished in writing for speakers of western Jamaican, but not for those of central Jamaican.

== Vocabulary ==
Jamaican Patois contains many loanwords, some of which are African in origin, primarily from Twi (a dialect of Akan). Many loanwords come from English, but some are also borrowed from Spanish, Portuguese, French, Hindi, Arawak, as well as, Scottish and Irish dialects.

Examples from African languages include /se/ meaning that (in the sense of "he told me that..." = /im tel mi se/), taken from Ashanti Twi, and duppy meaning ghost, taken from the Twi word dupon ('cotton tree root'), because of the African belief of malicious spirits originating in the roots of trees (in Jamaica and Ghana, particularly the cotton tree known in both places as "Odom"). The pronoun /unu/, used for the plural form of you, is taken from the Igbo language. Red eboe describes a fair-skinned black person because of the reported account of fair skin among the Igbo in the mid-1700s. De meaning to be (at a location) comes from Yoruba. From the Ashanti-Akan, comes the term Obeah which means witchcraft, from the Ashanti Twi word Ɔbayi which also means "witchcraft".

Words from Hindi include ganja (marijuana). Pickney or pickiney meaning child, taken from an earlier form (piccaninny) was ultimately borrowed from the Portuguese pequenino (the diminutive of pequeno, small) or Spanish pequeño ('small'). There are many words referring to popular produce, food items, and Jamaican cuisine—ackee, callaloo, guinep, bammy, roti, dal, kamranga.

== Literature and film ==
A rich body of literature has developed in Jamaican Patois. Notable among early authors and works are Thomas MacDermot's All Jamaica Library and Claude McKay's Songs of Jamaica (1909), and, more recently, dub poets Linton Kwesi Johnson and Mikey Smith. Subsequently, the life-work of Louise Bennett or Miss Lou (1919–2006) is particularly notable for her use of the rich colourful patois, despite being shunned by traditional literary groups. "The Jamaican Poetry League excluded her from its meetings, and editors failed to include her in anthologies." Nonetheless, she argued forcefully for the recognition of Jamaican as a full language, with the same pedigree as the dialect from which Standard English had sprung:

Dah language weh yuh proud a,
Weh yuh honour an respec –
Po Mas Charlie, yuh no know se
Dat it spring from dialec!

— Bans a Killin

After the 1960s, the status of Jamaican Patois rose as a number of respected linguistic studies were published, by Frederic Cassidy (1961, 1967), Bailey (1966) and others. Subsequently, it has gradually become mainstream to codemix or write complete pieces in Jamaican Patois; proponents include Kamau Brathwaite, who also analyses the position of Creole poetry in his History of the Voice: The Development of Nation Language in Anglophone Caribbean Poetry (1984). However, Standard English remains the more prestigious literary medium in Jamaican literature. Canadian-Caribbean science-fiction novelist Nalo Hopkinson often writes in Trinidadian and sometimes Jamaican Patois. Jean D'Costa penned a series of popular children's novels, including Sprat Morrison (1972; 1990), Escape to Last Man Peak (1976), and Voice in the Wind (1978), which draw liberally from Jamaican Patois for dialogue, while presenting narrative prose in Standard English. Marlon James employs Patois in his novels including A Brief History of Seven Killings (2014). In his science fiction novel Kaya Abaniah and the Father of the Forest (2015), British-Trinidadian author Wayne Gerard Trotman presents dialogue in Trinidadian Creole, Jamaican Patois, and French while employing Standard English for narrative prose.

Jamaican Patois is also presented in some films and other media, such as for example the character Tia Dalma's speech from Pirates of the Caribbean: Dead Man's Chest, and a few scenes in Meet Joe Black in which Brad Pitt's character converses with a Jamaican woman (Lois Kelly Miller). In addition, early Jamaican films like The Harder They Come (1972), Rockers (1978), and many of the films produced by Palm Pictures in the mid-1990s (e.g. Dancehall Queen and Third World Cop) have most of their dialogue in Jamaican Patois; some of these films have even been subtitled in English. It was also used in the second season of Marvel's Luke Cage but the accents were described as "awful" by Jamaican Americans.

=== Bible ===
In December 2011, it was reported that the Bible was being translated into Jamaican Patois. The Gospel of Luke has already appeared as Jiizas: di Buk We Luuk Rait bout Im. While the Rev. Courtney Stewart, managing the translation as General Secretary of the West Indies Bible Society, believes this will help elevate the status of Jamaican Patois, others think that such a move would undermine efforts at promoting the use of English. The Patois New Testament was launched in Britain (where the Jamaican diaspora is significant) in October 2012 as "Di Jamiekan Nyuu Testiment", and with print and audio versions in Jamaica in December 2012.

A comparison of the Lord's Prayer

...as it occurs in Di Jamiekan Nyuu Testiment:

1. Wi Faada we iina evn, mek piipl av nof rispek fi yu an yu niem.
2. Mek di taim kom wen yu ruul iina evri wie. Mek we yu waahn apm pan ort apm, jos laik ou a wa yu waahn fi apm iina evn apm.
3. Tide gi wi di fuud we wi niid. Paadn wi fi aal a di rang we wi du, siem laik ou wi paadn dem we du wi rang.
4. An no mek wi fies notn we wi kaaz wi fi sin, bot protek wi fram di wikid wan.

...as it occurs in English Standard Version:

1. Our Father in heaven, hallowed be Your name.
2. Your kingdom come, your will be done, on earth, as it is in heaven.
3. Give us this day our daily bread, and forgive us our debts, as we also have forgiven our debtors.
4. And lead us not into temptation, but deliver us from evil.

The system of spelling used in Di Jamiekan Nyuu Testiment is the phonetic Cassidy Writing system adopted by the Jamaica Language Unit of the University of the West Indies, and while most Jamaicans use the informal "Miss Lou" writing system, the Cassidy Writing system is an effort at standardising Patois in its written form.

=== Recent developments ===
Jamaican Patois has made some major strides in recent years, becoming one of the languages available on Google Translate, being used in the title of the Eurovision Song Contest 2026 winner, and being used by the People's National Party (PNP), which released an audio version of its 2025 general election manifesto in the language.

== Sample text ==
Article 1 of the Universal Declaration of Human Rights in Jamaican Patois:

Evribadi baan frii an iikwal wid rispek fi demself (digniti) an wid raits. Dem nuo ou fi riizn kaa dem av sens an nuo we rait fram we rang (kanshenz) an dem fi chriit dem wan aneda laik se dem a breda an sista.

Article 1 of the Universal Declaration of Human Rights in English:

All human beings are born free and equal in dignity and rights. They are endowed with reason and conscience and should act towards one another in a spirit of brotherhood.

== See also ==
- Bermudian English
- Cayman Islands English
- San Andrés–Providencia Creole
- Turks and Caicos Creole
- English-based creole languages
- Jamaican English
- Nation language
