= Cliff Lashley =

Jamaican poet

Cliff Lashley (1935 – February 1993) was a Jamaican poet and educator. His work appeared in publications including New World Journal, Black Images, and Cotopaxi.

Lashley was murdered in February 1993. In his memory the poet Velma Pollard wrote "for the gentleman of the waterfront". The economist Simon B. Jones-Hendrickson wrote "Three Diamonds in the Sky" in memory of Lashley, George Beckford and opinion pollster Carl Stone.
