= Frederic G. Cassidy =

Jamaican linguist and lexicographer

Frederic Gomes Cassidy (October 10, 1907 – June 14, 2000) was a Jamaican-born linguist and lexicographer. He was a professor of English at the University of Wisconsin-Madison, and founder of the Dictionary of American Regional English (DARE) where he was also the chief editor from 1962 until his death. He was an advocate for the Jamaican language and a pioneer of autonomous orthographies for creole languages.

== Early life and education ==
He was born in Kingston, Jamaica on October 10, 1907. His father was Canadian and his mother was Jamaican. In 1918, aged 11, Cassidy moved with his family to Akron, Ohio where he graduated from high school. He enrolled in Ohio University later transferring to Oberlin College, where he graduated in 1930 and obtained a master's degree in 1932. By 1938, Cassidy had earned his doctoral degree at the University of Michigan, and had married Hélène Lucille Monod, a fellow student.

== Career ==
In 1939, Cassidy accepted a lectureship at the University of Wisconsin, and was made full professor in 1950. His first book, published in 1947, was entitled The Place Names of Dane County, Wisconsin. Cassidy then joined with Albert H. Marckwardt to produce the second edition of the Scribner Handbook of English, which was published in 1954.

Cassidy started as Chief Editor of the Dictionary of American Regional English in 1962, and saw Volume I (covering A-C) published by Harvard University Press in 1985. Volume II, in which Joan Houston Hall joined him, covered letters D-H and followed in 1991. They continued their collaboration with Volume III (I-O), published in 1996. Since Cassidy's death, Joan Houston Hall has carried on Cassidy's work as Chief Editor of what has come to be known as the DARE project. Volume IV, covering P-Sk, came out in 2002, and Volume V, covering Sl-Z, was published in 2012. Volume VI, subtitled "Contrastive Maps, Index to Entry Labels, Questionnaire, and Fieldwork Data," was released in 2013. Joining Hall for that volume was Luanne von Schneidemesser who served as Senior Editor. Late that same year, the digital version was launched.

=== Jamaican and other creole languages ===
In 1951 a Fulbright Research Fellowship gave Cassidy the opportunity to travel back to his native Jamaica to research a Jamaican English and Jamaican creole dictionary. He used a tape recorder to document the language and may have been the first person to use the technology in the country. In 1961 he described the language of the people of Jamaica, what he called "folk speech", in a book titled Jamaica Talk. In 1967 he edited the Dictionary of Jamaican English, co-edited with Robert B. LePage, which drew from four centuries of written and oral usage.

==== Orthography for creole languages ====
Cassidy advocated for creole languages to use an orthography, or writing style, that did not rely on European spelling conventions.

The more the creole differs phonemically from the lexicalizing language (English, French, Dutch - whatever), the more it must differ in its orthography. It should be taught and learned in a system of its own ... Paramount should be a phonemically accurate, consistent, autonomous system

— Cassidy (1993)

Cassidy pioneered an orthography, initially proposed in 1961 and known as the Cassidy System, developed specifically for Jamaican that uses a phonemic system that closely reproduces the sound of the language. The Cassidy System was later adopted and modified by the Jamaican Language Unit (JLU) at University of the West Indies, and is now known as the Cassidy/JLU orthography.

In 2012 the Bible Society, in collaboration with JLU, translated the New Testament into Jamaican using the Cassidy orthography, it was published as Di Jamiekan Nyuu Testiment.

== Awards and honours ==
He was awarded three medals from the Institute of Jamaica; the Centenary Medal in 1979, the Silver Musgrave Medal in 1962 and the Gold Musgrave Medal in 1983.

He has honorary doctorates from the Memorial University of Newfoundland and the University of West Indies.
