= Erna Brodber =

Jamaican sociologist and writer (born 1940)

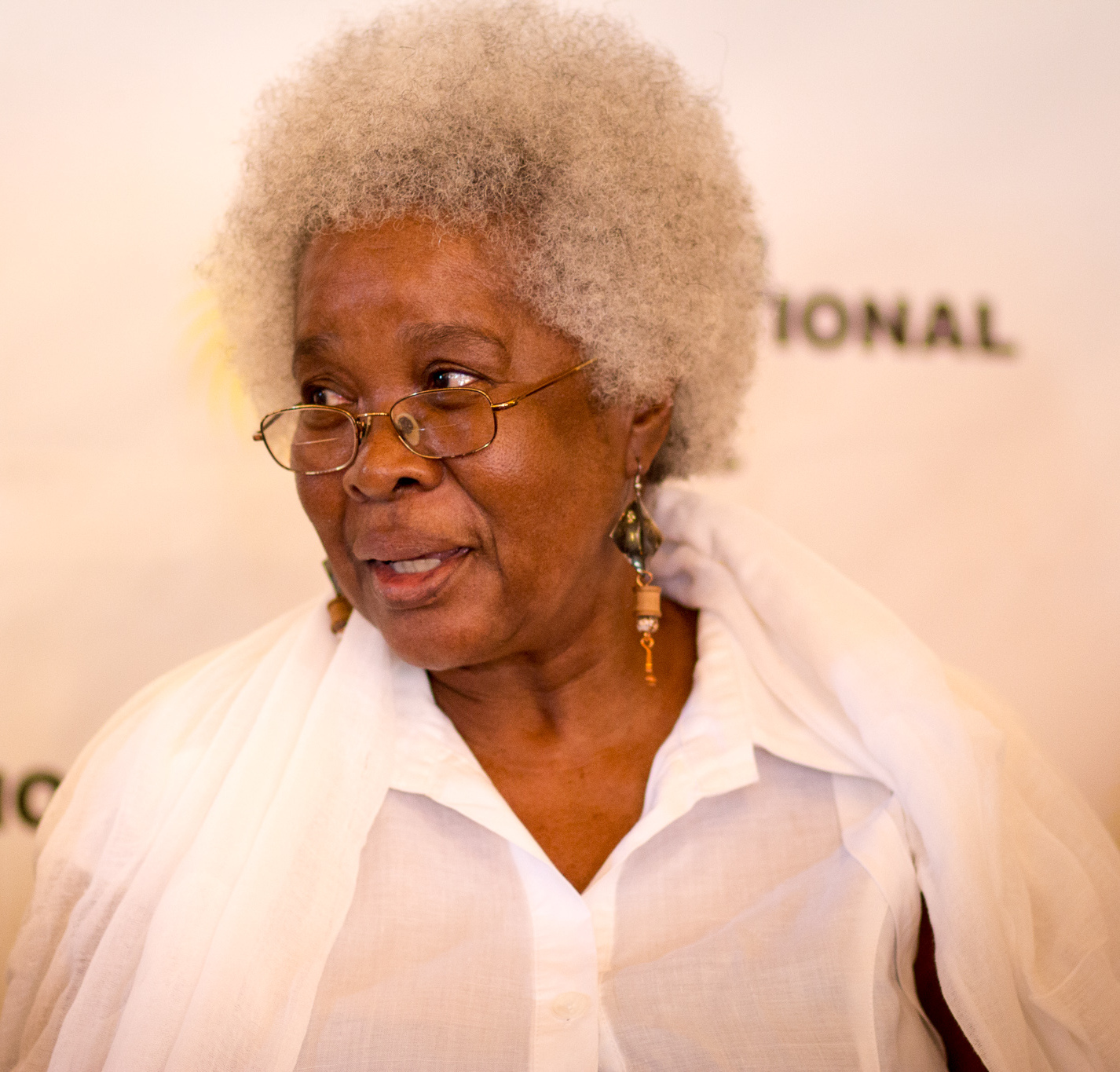
- Brodber at the 2015 Zanzibar International Film Festival
- Born: 20 April 1940 (age 86); Woodside, Saint Mary Parish, Colony of Jamaica, British Empire
- Education: University College of the West Indies
- Occupations: Novelist, sociologist, social activist
- Notable work: Jane and Louisa Will Soon Come Home (1980); Myal (1988)
- Relatives: Velma Pollard (sister)

Erna Brodber (born 20 April 1940) is a Jamaican writer, sociologist and social activist. She is the sister of writer Velma Pollard.

== Biography ==
Born in the farming village of Woodside, Saint Mary Parish, Jamaica, she gained a B.A. from the University College of the West Indies, followed by an MSc and PhD, and has received a predoctoral fellowship in psychiatric anthropology. She subsequently worked as a civil servant, teacher, sociology lecturer, and researcher at the Institute for Social and Economic Research in the University of the West Indies (UWI), Mona, Jamaica. During Brodber's time working at the Institute for Social and Economic Research at the University of the West Indies, she collected several oral histories of elderly people's lives in rural Jamaica, which inspired her novel, Louisiana. After working at the university, she left to work full-time in her home community of Woodside.

She is the author of five novels: Jane and Louisa Will Soon Come Home (1980), Myal (1988), Louisiana (1994), The Rainmaker's Mistake (2007), and Nothing's Mat (2014). She also writes non-fiction. Brodber works as a freelance writer, researcher, and lecturer in Jamaica. She was Writer-in-Residence at the University of the West Indies, Mona for the 2013-2014 academic year.

== Work ==
Brodber—trained as a sociologist with a Ph.D. and several publications on Jamaican society—emphasizes non-western forms of understanding in her fiction, deconstructing the historical methodologies of colonialist knowledge. She works to challenge western ways of ordering the world, and to resurrect myth and tradition as a form of historical rehabilitation from the psychic damage of slavery and colonialism. She weaves fantastical, non-realist elements with traditional modes of story-telling—emphasizing both as crucial to the psychic make-up of her characters and the world around them. As seen in her novel Louisiana, Brodber also plays with western notions of time. Time is ambiguous among the characters and not exactly viewed in a straight line. The shared experiences of those in the past mingle with those in the present.

== Awards and honours ==
Brodber won the Caribbean and Canadian regional Commonwealth Writers' Prize in 1989 for Myal. In 1999, she was awarded the Musgrave Gold Award for Literature and Orature from the Institute of Jamaica, and she was awarded the Order of Distinction (Commander Class) from the government of Jamaica in 2004. She received a Prince Claus Award in 2006 and a Windham–Campbell Literature Prize in 2017.

== Bibliography ==
Novels

- Jane and Louisa Will Soon Come Home (London: New Beacon Books, 1980). Extracted in Margaret Busby (ed.), Daughters of Africa (1992), pp. 503ff.
- Myal: A Novel (New Beacon Books, 1988), ISBN 978-0901241863
- Louisiana (New Beacon Books, 1994)
- The Rainmaker's Mistake (New Beacon Books, 2007), ISBN 978-1873201206
- Nothing's Mat (University of West Indies Press, 2014), ISBN 978-9766404949

Non-fiction

- The People of my Jamaican Village, 1817 - 1948 (Blackspace, 1999), ISBN 9789764101321
- Woodside, Pear Tree Grove P.O. (University of the West Indies Press, 2004), ISBN 978-9766401528
- The Second Generation of Freemen in Jamaica, 1907–1944 (University Press of Florida, 2004), ISBN 978-0-8130-2759-3
- The Continent of Black Consciousness: On the History of the African Diaspora from Slavery to the Present Day (New Beacon Books, 2003), ISBN 978-1-873201-17-6
- Moments of Cooperation and Incorporation: African American and African Jamaican Connections, 1782-1996 (The University of West Indies Press, 2019), ISBN 978-976-640-708-7

Play

- Ratoon: a New Jamaica (2015). Performed by the Edna Manley College of the Visual and Performing Arts, School of Drama, directed by Carolyn Allen.
