= Metro 2033 (video game) =

2010 video game

- Developer: 4A Games
- Publishers: THQ; Deep Silver (Redux)
- Director: Andrew Prokhorov
- Designer: Viacheslav Aristov
- Programmers: Oles Shyshkovstov; Alexander Maximchuk; Alexei Buinitskiy
- Artist: Andrey Tkachenko
- Writers: Dmitry Glukhovsky; Andrew Prokhorov; Viacheslav Aristov
- Composers: Alexei Omelchuk; Georgiy Beloglazov
- Series: Metro
- Engine: 4A Engine
- Platforms: Microsoft Windows; Xbox 360; PlayStation 4; Xbox One; Nintendo Switch; Linux; macOS; Stadia; PlayStation 5; Xbox Series X/S
- Release: 16 March 2010: Windows, Xbox 360; NA: 16 March 2010; AU: 18 March 2010; EU: 19 March 2010 PlayStation 4, Xbox One; NA: 26 August 2014; EU: 29 August 2014; AU: 4 September 2014 Linux; WW: 11 December 2014 OS X; WW: 14 April 2015 Nintendo Switch; WW: 28 February 2020 Stadia; WW: 23 June 2020 PlayStation 5, Xbox Series X/S; WW: 29 October 2026
- Genre: First-person shooter
- Mode: Single-player

Metro 2033 is a 2010 first-person shooter video game developed by 4A Games and published by THQ. The survival horror story is based on Dmitry Glukhovsky's novel of the same name, where survivors of a nuclear war have taken refuge in the Metro tunnels of Moscow. The player controls the silent protagonist Artyom, a man who must save his home station from the dangers lurking within the Metro. In the game, the player encounters human and mutant enemies, who can be killed with a variety of firearms. They must also wear a gas mask to explore areas covered in nuclear radiation, both underground and on the surface.

Metro 2033 was the debut title for 4A Games, whose founders had experience working on S.T.A.L.K.E.R.: Shadow of Chernobyl at GSC Game World. Glukhovsky chose 4A Games to adapt his novel due to the studio's location in Ukraine, and their expertise in developing first-person shooters. Glukhovsky gave the studio much creative freedom. 4A Games focused their efforts on storytelling and atmosphere, intentionally avoiding any multiplayer gameplay to achieve their goal. The game was powered by the studio's own proprietary 4A Engine. It was first announced in 2006 as Metro 2033: The Last Refuge.

The game was released in March 2010 for Microsoft Windows and Xbox 360. Critics gave the game positive reviews, with praise for its horror elements, detailed environments, and interesting plot. However, the game was also criticized for its bugs and artificial intelligence. Metro 2033 was profitable for THQ, selling more than 1.5 million copies by June 2012, though the publisher felt that their marketing efforts were rushed. A sequel titled Metro: Last Light was released in 2013, with Deep Silver acquiring the publishing rights from THQ after their bankruptcy. A remastered version titled Metro 2033 Redux was released in 2014 for Microsoft Windows, PlayStation 4 and Xbox One. The remastered version was also included as part of a compilation titled Metro Redux containing both Metro 2033 Redux and Metro: Last Light Redux. A third installment, Metro Exodus, was released in 2019.

== Gameplay ==
A gameplay screenshot of the original Metro 2033. The tunnels are often dimly lit, and the player must use a flashlight to see in the darkness.

Metro 2033 is a first-person shooter video game. It is predominantly set within the tunnels of the Moscow Metro, though some sections take place on the surface, in the ruins of Moscow. The story is told through a linear single-player campaign, and important plot moments are shown during cutscenes.

The human and mutant enemies can be killed with a variety of firearms. The game features traditional guns like a revolver, assault rifles and shotguns, as well as more inventive weapons like a pneumatic crossbow. In firefights, human enemies take cover and flank the player, while mutant enemies stay in the open and try to bite or maul them. Alternatively, the player can employ stealth to evade certain human and mutant enemies or kill them silently. This can be achieved by using a throwing knife to kill an enemy from afar, or shooting an enemy with a suppressed weapon. The player can recover health by waiting for it to regenerate, or by using a med-kit to heal themselves immediately. The game features a minimalistic heads-up display (HUD). Gameplay information is presented to the player via audio and visual cues. For instance, they must inspect their weapons to see if they are about to run out of ammunition and therefore have to reload.

Since the game has elements of the survival horror genre, the player often has little ammunition, and must scavenge for supplies from caches or dead bodies. An essential supply is pre-war 5.45×39mm ammunition, referred to in-game as "military grade ammunition", which is also the main currency in the tunnels. This ammunition can be traded for weapons and upgrades, or used directly as stronger bullets than other scavenged ammunition. As most of the tunnels feature little to no light, the player can use a flashlight to explore dark areas. However, the flashlight needs to be charged with a battery charger in order to stay effective. The player must also use a gas mask to explore areas affected by radiation, both underground and on the surface. The gas mask can be damaged in combat, which forces the player to find a replacement. The player's survival also depends on constantly replacing their air filter, which they can monitor by inspecting Artyom's wristwatch.

Throughout the game, there are certain moral choices that can be made. If the player is compassionate to the people living in the tunnels, such as giving the homeless some military grade ammunition, they may be able to watch a different cutscene at the end of the game. These moral choices are never explicitly mentioned, and it is possible to play through the game without knowing of their presence.

== Synopsis ==
=== Setting ===
Metro 2033 takes place in the city of Moscow, Russia 20 years after a global nuclear holocaust in 2013. Moscow has become a wasteland filled with killer mutants and irradiated air and is uninhabitable for humans without protective gear. The surviving population now lives in the Moscow Metro, which is described as a labyrinth of railways, tunnels, and bunkers. Inside the metro, food, water, and supplies are scarce which lead to the formation of factions; Most notably the "Hanza", the "Red Line", and the "Rangers of the Order". The metro is dilapidated, with some places even requiring a universal charger in order to activate certain gates or switches. Other areas of the metro are also irradiated and filled with water or debris. Some areas contain anomalies or the supernatural which can cause psychic damage towards those that approach those areas. On the surface, the city is desolate, air and water are contaminated with radiation, and nearly everything is covered in ice and snow. While uninhabitable to humans, the surface is home to many mutants, especially the Dark Ones. The overall tone that the game tries to encapture is a grim and melancholic feeling, as well as displaying the miserable lives of people who have survived the great war.

=== Plot ===
In 2013, nuclear war devastated the Earth, wiping out billions of lives. Among the affected nations is Russia, including the now-desolate wasteland of Moscow. A handful of survivors manage to hide in the Metro system, salvaging spare parts and growing mushrooms for food. Animals such as rats or bears have mutated into horrific monsters, while the air in many areas becomes heavily irradiated and impossible to survive in without a gas mask. There is a constant state of war between Stalinists and Nazis, while opportunistic bandits seize hostages and supplies in the metro tunnels. The Rangers emerge as a neutral peacekeeping force within the Metro.

By 2033, the northern station of VDNKh, now called Exhibition, is attacked by mysterious creatures called the Dark Ones. An elite Ranger named Hunter asks for support from a 24-year-old survivor named Artyom (Russian: Артём), the adopted son of the station commander. Before leaving to track the Dark Ones, Hunter gives Artyom his dog tags and tells him to present them to his superiors in Polis, the "capital" of the Metro.

The next day, Artyom signs on as a guard for a caravan headed to Riga, a neighboring station. Along the way, the crew is incapacitated by a psychic attack, but Artyom is not affected. After the caravan reaches safety, Artyom meets Bourbon, a smuggler who offers to take him to Polis. The two make their way through several stations and tunnels, and even pass through the surface of Moscow itself, before Bourbon is killed by bandits. A traveler named Khan then rescues Artyom. After escorting Artyom through haunted tunnels and an embattled station, Khan advises Artyom to meet his contact Andrew the Blacksmith, who lives under the control of the Red Line, a Stalinist regime. With Andrew's help, Artyom sneaks out of Red Line territory but is subsequently captured by their enemies, the neo-Nazi Fourth Reich.

Artyom is rescued from execution by two Rangers, Pavel and Ulman, before Pavel eventually dies escorting Artyom out of Reich territory. Now travelling alone, Artyom comes across a group of survivors trying to stop a mutant horde from reaching Polis. Although they fail, Artyom manages to rescue a young boy before they escape, and the defenders help Artyom reach the surface. There, he reunites with Ulman, who takes him to meet Miller, the colonel of the Rangers in Polis.

The Polis governing council ultimately refuses to help Exhibition. But Miller tells Artyom his back-up plan: a missile silo known as D6 that could destroy the Dark Ones' hive in the Botanical Gardens. To find a way to D6, Miller tells Artyom to meet him at the Moscow State Library to search for a map. As he makes his way to the library, Artyom is forced to continue alone while avoiding mutants. He eventually finds a map and flees with the help of both Miller and Ulman. They recruit Artyom as a Ranger, who joins an operation to locate and reactivate the D6 command center. After their success, Artyom and Miller climb Ostankino Tower to install a laser guidance system. Soon after, Artyom experiences a vivid hallucination induced by a Dark One.

After the hallucination, there are two possible endings depending on the player's choices throughout the game. In the canonical ending, Artyom allows the missiles to fire, destroying the Dark Ones. The alternate ending gives Artyom the choice to destroy the laser guidance device, citing a last-minute realization that the Dark Ones were using the hallucinations to make peaceful contact. This ending is only available if the player has performed certain compassionate acts, such as helping fellow humans and not fleeing the Dark Ones in various hallucinations.

== Development ==
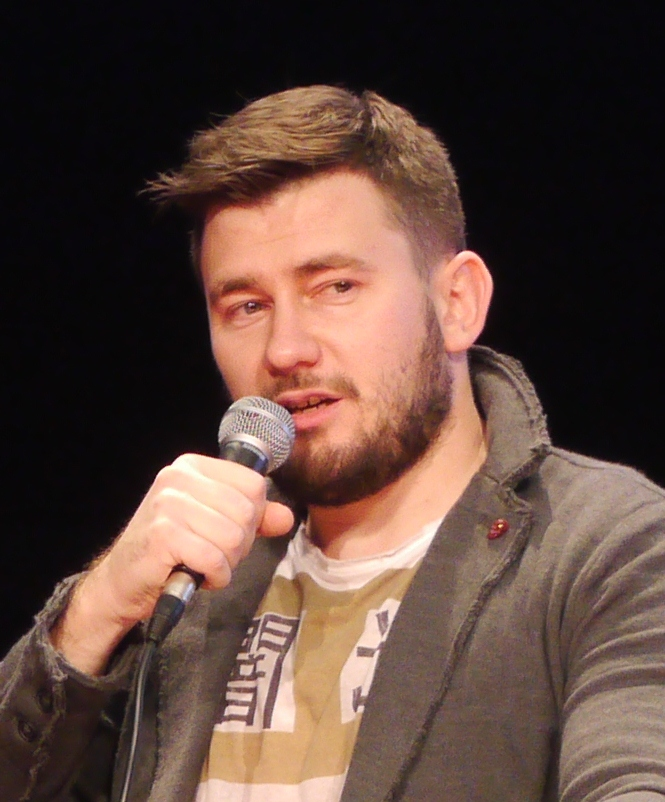
Dmitry Glukhovsky, the author of Metro 2033

Metro 2033 was developed by Ukrainian studio 4A Games, founded around 2005. The founders had worked at GSC Game World, previously Ukraine's only major game studio, and creators of S.T.A.L.K.E.R.: Shadow of Chernobyl. After the release of S.T.A.L.K.E.R., Andrew Prokhorov left GSC due to disagreements with management, helping to found 4A Games as director. GSC's chief executive officer also fired the entire art team after S.T.A.L.K.E.R. was released, and nearly all employees came to work at 4A.

The game is based on Dmitry Glukhovsky's novel of the same name. Glukhovsky was inspired by the books of Roger Zelazny and Ray Bradbury, as well as the first Fallout game. Years before Glukhovsky was offered a book publishing deal in 2005, he uploaded the manuscript of the novel to his personal website, leading a number of game studios to approach him for a potential adaptation of his work. Glukhovsky was open-minded about studios creating new chapters in his Metro series, describing this as "as much of an honor as getting the book screened and turned into a movie", and hoping that this would grow the audience for his fiction. He also felt that a game adaptation would allow him to focus on other projects, leaving the Metro universe in the careful custody of other artists.

Glukhovsky ultimately chose 4A Games because they shared an "Eastern European mindset", both having a first-hand understanding of the collapse of the Soviet Union. He was also impressed with the team's previous work, as well as their pitch to adapt Metro as a first-person shooter, since the book reveals the thoughts of the protagonists, albeit it is written in the third-person. Glukhovsky gave 4A much creative freedom, while ensuring that the game was true to his story, themes, and meaning, even rewriting the dialog for the Russian version of the game. According to Glukhovsky, the main theme of Metro 2033 is xenophobia, particularly the human reaction to the mysterious Dark Ones. Glukhovsky also saw it as a coming of age story for the protagonist Artyom, as a young man trying to find the meaning of his life. The game does feature political satire and social criticism, particularly about modern Russia, but this was not intended as the game's focus. The game differs from the book by offering two endings, which Glukhovsky felt was an interesting choice to give the player.

The game utilizes 4A Engine, a proprietary game engine developed by 4A Games. It was developed by programmers Oles Shishkovtsov and Oleksandr Maksimchuk, who had previously worked on the X-Ray engine for the S.T.A.L.K.E.R. series. Grygorovych accused 4A Games of using the pre-release versions of the X-Ray engine, but Shishkovtsov responded by refuting this. First, the GSC engine did not work on home consoles, whereas the 4A Engine was designed with this in mind. Shishkovtsov also described how the 4A Engine began as a pet project due to his frustrations with the X-Ray engine, before expanding his project with the 4A Games team.

The studio's goal was to focus on atmosphere and story, having been largely inspired by Half-Life 2. They hoped that their narrative focus would help the game stand out from other post-apocalyptic titles like S.T.A.L.K.E.R. and Fallout. According to producer Huw Beynon, their aim was for every scene to contribute to the game's narrative, describing this as "cinematic". Since it was not practical to turn every major plot point into a cutscene, the studio instead strove to create an immersive atmosphere by using both environmental storytelling and incidental conversations. For instance, non-playable characters have their own daily routines and frequently gossip with each other. The team also included many quieter non-combat moments, to improve the game's variety, pacing, and sense of discovery. The team decided to keep the HUD minimalistic, to keep the player immersed in the game world with fewer distractions. Instead, the game puts many of its cues in the environment, such as the player viewing their objectives by physically opening Artyom's journal. The team also focused their resources exclusively on the single-player experience, deliberately avoiding any multiplayer component.

== Marketing and release ==
In August 2006, 4A Games first announced the game as Metro 2033: The Last Refuge, for both PC and PlayStation 3. THQ's Dean Sharpe saw early footage of the game at a trade show, incidentally around the time that Sharpe was also promoting S.T.A.L.K.E.R.: Shadow of Chernobyl. Sharpe was impressed with 4A's work and convinced THQ to become their publisher, which later led him to join 4A Games as CEO. THQ officially announced the partnership in October 2009, revealing the now-retitled game Metro 2033 for both PC and Xbox 360. The decision to skip PlayStation 3 was a business decision for THQ, and not a technical limitation. Metro 2033 was marketed on Steam by offering Red Faction: Guerrilla with pre-orders. THQ also released a Limited Edition for the game, including the game disc, four art cards, and a replica of an in-game automatic shotgun.

The game was released on 16 March 2010 in North America, and 19 March 2010 in Europe. Immediately after the game's release, the studio announced that it had begun developing downloadable content for Metro 2033. The content was later revealed to as the "Ranger pack", which added two new weapons, as well as a Ranger mode that removed the HUD, and reduced the ammunition supply while boosting damage. The pack was released on 3 August 2010.

Reflecting on the game a year after release, THQ's Vice-President Danny Bilson admitted that the game was not "properly supported in all areas", singling out problems with product development and marketing. Bilson also described the game as "an orphan stepchild", as the publishing agreement with 4A Games was signed late in development, leaving less time to properly market the title before release.

=== Metro 2033 Redux ===
On 22 May 2014, a remastered version titled Metro 2033 Redux was announced, featuring updates to the 4A Engine from the development of the sequel, Metro: Last Light. This included graphical changes such as improved lighting, animations, and particle effects, as well as dynamic weather. This also allowed gameplay changes from Last Light, including improved controls, combat, stealth mechanics, and artificial intelligence. This also added Last Light's features to 2033, such as silent takedowns, customized weapons, and the ability to wipe gas masks. The Redux version was released on 26 August 2014 in North America, and 29 August 2014 in Europe for Microsoft Windows, PlayStation 4, and Xbox One. The remastered version also led to a compilation package with both 2033 Redux and Last Light Redux, under the cumulative title of Metro Redux.

The remastered versions of the two games were published by Deep Silver. A demo of 2033 Redux, which allows the player to play through the first one-third of the game, was released for PlayStation 4 and Xbox One on 2 June 2015. Metro 2033 Redux was later released for the Nintendo Switch on 28 February 2020 and on Stadia on 23 June 2020. A free "Next-Gen Update" for the PC version was released on 22 October 2026, while versions for PlayStation 5 and Xbox Series X/S were released on 29 October as a free upgrade for PlayStation 4 and Xbox One owners, respectively.

== Reception ==
=== Critical reception ===
Reception

Aggregate score
Aggregator	Score
Metacritic	PC: 81/100; X360: 77/100

Review scores
Publication	Score
1Up.com	C+
Destructoid	8/10
Eurogamer	8/10
Game Informer	9/10
GamePro	3.5/5
GameSpot	8/10
GamesRadar+	4.5/5
GameTrailers	7.8/10
Giant Bomb	3/5
IGN	Original: 6.9/10 Redux: 8.6/10
Joystiq	4/5
VideoGamer.com	7/10

Metro 2033 received "generally favorable reviews", according to review aggregator website Metacritic. Most critics agreed that the game was a compelling and engrossing experience undermined by inadequate gameplay systems and poor artificial intelligence.

During the 14th Annual Interactive Achievement Awards, the Academy of Interactive Arts & Sciences nominated Metro 2033 for "Outstanding Achievement in Story" and "Outstanding Achievement in Visual Engineering".

The game's story and pacing received acclaim from critics. Phil Kollar from Game Informer praised the main campaign's variety of scenarios and set-pieces, especially the climax of the game's story. Eurogamer's Jim Rossignol also liked the campaign's variety and cinematic sequences, highlighting how "the action is expertly punctuated with unexpected experiences". Justin McElroy from Joystiq also liked the story, praising the characters as likeable for their courage and resilience. IGN's Ryan Clements felt that the game included "interesting sights and sounds", that the game suffered from bland characters and a "clumsy" story. James Stephanie Sterling from Destructoid felt that the story was "decent" and the themes were "intruiging" and "powerful", but expressed disappointment that it was not as fleshed out as the source materials. GamePro's Tae K. Kim felt that there was not enough context for an otherwise strong backstory, as he "never fully understood the world", making the game an awkward entry point to the fiction of the novel.

The atmosphere was often considered one of the game's highlights. Matthew Pellett from GamesRadar described the setting as "evocative", and compared the game favourably to BioShock and Half-Life 2. Writing for GameSpot, Chris Watters praised the atmosphere as "oppressive", and that the "relentless gloom can begin to wear you down". The dialogue between non-playable characters was often praised for making the game world more immersive. McElroy highlighted details such as the wristwatch and battery pump for adding to the sense of immersion. Rossignol described the game world as one that is "heaving with apocalyptic detail", and praised the gas masks for inducing a "claustrophobic feeling". Sterling felt that the game's unforgiving gameplay also facilitated player immersion. He added that 2033 was "one of the most traditional survival horrors to be seen in years", as the player must survive the tunnels with a bare minimum of resources, making the experience more intense and frightening. Kim also praised the 4A Engine for "bringing this desolate and sad world to life", and applauded the developers' effort to interweave gameplay with the narrative. Tom Orry from VideoGamer.com also applauded the game for its visuals and immersion, but criticized the game's linearity and loading screens.

Critics had more mixed opinions for the gameplay. Watters praised the game for rewarding the player for exploration, as well as the game's diversity of weapons. However, Kollar felt that the weapons were not interesting enough. Rossignol liked the scarce ammunition and survivalist elements of combat, but felt that the inaccuracy of the aiming system was frustrating. Kollar agreed that the aiming and the control was too loose. Sterling also analyzed the combat, expressing that it was better as a survival game than an action game. Sterling and Clements criticized the stealth mechanics for bugs, with McElroy remarking that enemies become invincible during certain animations. Reviewers also criticized the game's artificial intelligence, as well as the game's lack of replay value.

The Redux version received a much more positive reception from critics. They heavily praised the game's overall atmosphere but especially the enhanced gameplay and graphical update with IGN's Mike Reparaz saying "Redux is overall a much smoother, more enjoyable, and better-looking way to experience Metro 2033."

=== Sales ===
Metro 2033 was the fifth best-selling retail game in the UK in its week of release, beaten by fellow new release God of War III and titles including Battlefield: Bad Company 2, Final Fantasy XIII and Just Dance. THQ described the game as "very profitable" for the company. CEO for THQ, Brain Farrell, added that due to the low cost of development in Eastern Europe, modest level of sales would already guarantee Metro 2033 as a commercial success. The game was significantly more popular in Europe than North America. In June 2012, it was revealed that the game had sold more than 1.5 million copies. While the exact sales of the game have not been revealed, Deep Silver announced that the Metro Redux collection sold more than 1.5 million copies in April 2015.

== Sequels ==
The sequel Metro: Last Light was released in 2013. The story continues the events from the original game, and does not follow any direct storylines from the book Metro 2034. Deep Silver acquired the publishing rights from THQ after they declared bankruptcy. A third instalment, Metro Exodus, was released in 2019.
