= Jean D'Costa =

Jamaican children's novelist, linguist and professor emeritus

- Born: Jean Constance Creary; 13 January 1937 (age 89); St. Andrew, Colony of Jamaica, British Empire
- Education: University College of the West Indies; Oxford University
- Occupations: Professor, linguist
- Spouse: David D'Costa
- Writing career
- Language: English, Jamaican Creole
- Genre: Children's literature
- Notable awards: Silver Musgrave Medal (1994)

Jean Constance D'Costa (born 13 January 1937) is a Jamaican children's novelist, linguist, and professor emeritus. Her novels have been praised for their use of both Jamaican Creole and Standard English.

== Early life and education ==
Jean Constance Creary was born in St. Andrew, Jamaica, the youngest of three children to parents who were school teachers. After retirement, her father was ordained an Anglican minister. The Crearys moved to Kingston in December, 1944, where she attended Whitfield Town elementary school (1945-1948), but she and her siblings spent many school holidays in St. James and Trelawny. In 1949 she attended St. Hilda's High School in Brown's Town, St. Ann as a government scholar. In 1955 she spent two transformative terms at St. Hugh's High School where she was advised to pursue the English Honors degree at University College of the West Indies. She earned a scholarship for a bachelor's degree in English literature and language at UCWI and then a master's degree in literature at Oxford University.

== Career ==
In 1962, after Oxford, she returned to teach Old English and linguistics at University College of the West Indies. She also served as a consultant to Jamaica's Ministry of Education on education in Jamaica in the newly independent country, and served on various education committees.

D'Costa continued her creative writing while teaching and consulting. Her two most popular novels, Sprat Morrison (1972) and Escape to Last Man Peak (1976), have been used in schools throughout Jamaica and the Caribbean region. Her novels are geared primarily towards children aged 11 to 13. She researched and wrote extensively on Jamaican creole culture., and published handbooks for service agencies in Jamaica, including the Kingston office of the United States Peace Corps.

In 1980, D'Costa received a professorship at Hamilton College where she stayed until 1998. She taught Old English, Caribbean literature, creative writing, and linguistics.

== Themes ==
Writing for children on the cusp of teenhood, D'Costa addresses "their need to relate to actuality ... and their need to retain some of the comforting illusions of childhood". To satisfy the latter need, she draws from Jamaican folklore and oral traditions for the plots, themes, and tone of her works. Prominent in Caribbean folklore are "duppy stories", in which ghosts or unsettled spirits return to haunt the land of the living. In her third novel, Voice in the Wind, for example, D'Costa addresses children's perceptions about death and the supernatural. She also references the oral tales that were traditionally told "at wakes and nine-nights". D'Costa paints a vivid picture of historical and contemporary Jamaican countryside.

D'Costa often uses Jamaican Creole for dialogue alongside Standard English. Her use of language, together with her understanding that her works are models for children's own literary attempts, makes her books natural subjects for classroom discussion. Sprat Morrison has been required reading in the "first grade" of Jamaican high schools since 1972, while Escape to Last Man Peak and Voice in the Wind are assigned by many teachers. Students have corresponded with D'Costa and she has accepted invitations to speak in schools. Her works have been lauded for preserving and conveying Jamaican speech rhythms and dialect.

== Personal life ==
D'Costa retired from Hamilton College in 1998, with the title of professor emeritus. She married David D'Costa, a journalist, in 1967. They relocated to Florida in 1997.

== Awards and recognition ==
- Children's Writers Award (Jamaican Reading Association, 1976)
- Gertrude Flesh Bristol Award (Hamilton College, 1984)
- Silver Musgrave Medal (Institute of Jamaica, 1994) for contributions to children's literature and linguistics

== Selected works ==
=== Novels and short stories ===
- Jenny and the General. Carlong. 2006. ISBN 9766380767.
- Duppy Tales. Longman. 1997. ISBN 0582297931.
- Caesar and the Three Robbers. Addison-Wesley Longman. 1996. ISBN 0582288142.
- Voice in the Wind. Longman Caribbean. 1978. ISBN 0582767180.
- Escape to Last Man Peak. Longman Caribbean. 1976. ISBN 0582765757.
- Sprat Morrison. Ministry of Education, Jamaica. 1972. ISBN 9780003900095. (2nd edition, 1990)

=== Anthologies ===
- Over Our Way: A Collection of Caribbean Short Stories for Young Readers. Longman Caribbean. 1980. ISBN 0582765676. (with Velma Pollard)

=== Books ===
- Caribbean Literary Discourse: Voice and Cultural Identity in the Anglophone Caribbean. University of Alabama Press. 2014. ISBN 978-0817318079. (with Barbara Lalla and Velma Pollard)
- Language in Exile: Three Hundred Years of Jamaican Creole. University of Alabama Press. 2009. ISBN 978-0817355654. (with Barbara Lalla)
- Voices in Exile: Jamaican Texts of the 18th and 19th centuries. University of Alabama Press. 2009. ISBN 978-0817355661. (with Barbara Lalla)
- Roger Mais: The Hills Were Joyful Together and Brother Man. Longman. 1978. ISBN 0582785006.

=== Linguistic handbooks ===
- Language and Dialect in Jamaica. Caribbean Communications Project/Arawidi Limited. 1980.
- Jamaica Patois: Vocabulary and Phraseology. Family Liaison Office. 1978.
- Core Phrase List and Vocabulary Items in Jamaican Usage: For Use by Peace Corps Volunteers. Peace Corps Jamaica. 1979.
- d'Costa, Jean; Berry, Jack (1971). Some Considerations of Tone in Jamaican Creole. (with Jack Berry)
