= Metro Exodus =

2019 video game

- Developer: 4A Games
- Publisher: Deep Silver
- Director: Andrew Prokhorov
- Producer: Mykola Muravskyi
- Designer: Viacheslav Aristov
- Programmers: Oles Shyshkovtsov; Alexander Maximchuk; Vlad Gapchych
- Artist: Sergei Karmalsky
- Writer: Andrei Paskhalov
- Composer: Alexei Omelchuk
- Series: Metro
- Engine: 4A Engine
- Platforms: PlayStation 4; Windows; Xbox One; Stadia; Linux; macOS; PlayStation 5; Xbox Series X/S
- Release: 15 February 2019: PS4, Windows, Xbox One; 15 February 2019; Stadia; 19 November 2019; Linux, macOS; 14 April 2021; Enhanced Edition; Windows; 6 May 2021; PS5, Xbox Series X/S; 18 June 2021
- Genre: First-person shooter
- Mode: Single-player

Metro Exodus is a first-person shooter video game developed by 4A Games and published by Deep Silver in 2019. The game is the third installment in the Metro video game series, which is based on Dmitry Glukhovsky's novels. It is a sequel to Metro: Last Light and the book Metro 2035, and follows protagonist Artyom and his allies as they flee the Moscow Metro and set off on an intercontinental journey through Russia and parts of Kazakhstan on a locomotive called Aurora. The story takes place over a year, during which Artyom visits locations such as the Volga River and the Caspian Sea. The game improves on the gameplay mechanics of Last Light; it includes both several miniature open world locations and more linear levels like earlier games in the series.

Starting in 2014, the game was developed by a team of around 150 based in Kyiv and Malta. The Exodus studio's main objective was to combine the core gameplay pillars of the Metro series with elements from S.T.A.L.K.E.R.: Shadow of Chernobyl (2007), which prioritizes emergent gameplay and features a large, explorable space. The team experimented with open-world gameplay and excluded mission markers so that players can explore naturally. To keep the game immersive, the game had a minimalistic head-up display, as in-game information was physicalized through Artyom's gears and equipment. 4A collaborated with Glukhovsky on the game's story, which focuses more on Artyom's personal story and relationships, forgoing some of the supernatural elements found in previous games for a more grounded story.

Announced in June 2017, Metro Exodus was released for PlayStation 4, Windows and Xbox One in February 2019. An upgraded version of the game titled Metro Exodus Enhanced Edition was released for PlayStation 5, Windows, and Xbox Series X/S in May 2021. The game received generally positive reviews from critics, who praised its visuals, level design, gameplay and story. It has sold over 10 million units as of February 2024. Two downloadable expansions titled The Two Colonels and Sam's Story, each of which features a new playable character, were released in August 2019 and February 2020, respectively. A sequel titled Metro 2039 is scheduled for release in February 2027.

== Gameplay ==
Unlike previous games in the series, Metro Exodus features large, open levels that can be freely explored by players.

Like earlier games in the series, Metro Exodus is a first-person shooter. The player controls player-character Artyom, who must leave the tunnels of Moscow and travel across the post-apocalyptic wasteland of the former Russian Federation and Republic of Kazakhstan while fighting against mutated creatures and hostile humans. The game occurs in one in-game year; environments change along with the seasons as the story progresses. Like earlier Metro games, Metro Exodus includes linear missions and introduces several large, open spaces for players to explore. A locomotive named the Aurora serves as the game's hub area, where players can converse with other non-playable characters. Using binoculars, players can identify points of interest in each of the game's map. Some areas are severely irradiated and a gas mask must be worn due to toxic air. Each gas filter lasts one minute each, and these must be replaced provided the player has more in reserve. Players must wipe off dirt and blood splatter that collect on the gas mask, which may crack if it is damaged, and players must temporarily repair it using duct tape. The game features a minimalist head-up display (HUD); information is usually displayed to the player through tangible objects. For instance, a timer on Artyom's wristwatch shows how long until the current filter expires; flashlight will flicker if it is running low on battery. A compass that displays the direction of their objectives can be attached to the wristwatch.

Players can use firearms such as pistols, shotguns, sniper rifles, and submachine guns, as well as air-powered weapons such as the Tikhar and the Helsing crossbow, to defeat enemies. Consumables such as Molotov cocktails and grenades can also be used against enemies. The player can carry three weapons at any one time. Players can swap their equipped weapons with those they find in the game world; weapons may also be dismantled for parts and resources, and they can be extensively customized; for instance, a laser sight may be attached to a weapon to increase its accuracy. Players must scavenge for resources as they explore the game's world. In addition to ammunition, players must collect "chemicals" and "materials", both of which are necessary for crafting new consumables and ammunition. Players can craft gas filters, medkits, and ammunition for air-powered weapons by deploying Artyom's backpack. Ammunition for regular weapons must be crafted at workbenches on Aurora. At workbenches, players can also permanently repair their gas masks and clean their weapons. Performance of uncleaned weapons will decrease and they may jam during combat. Through exploring and completing side activities, players will find new gears and upgrades; for instance, they will acquire night-vision goggles in the Volga River map and a motion tracker in the Caspian Sea level, both of which can aid the player in combat.

Players can approach their missions in a variety of ways. They can use stealth tactics such as turning off lights to remain hidden and throwing a can to distract enemies. Alternatively, they can use a lethal approach such as tossing a throwing knife at enemies to quietly kill them. Players are encouraged to plan before approaching a mission. The behavior of enemies, which are controlled by artificial intelligence, may change depending on the time of day. For instance, enemies patrolling a camp during daytime may retreat and sleep inside the camp at night, making infiltration easier. The game has a dynamic weather system, allowing players to take advantages of storms and rain, which mask the sounds of Artyom's footsteps. The time of day can be changed at safehouses in the game's world. Not all human survivors are hostile; some may provide valuable information and open up new points of interest, and some may join Artyom's crew. Subtle moral choices in the game provide karma; good karma can be gained by helping non-playable characters, speaking with survivors with Artyom's gun holstered, and sparing enemies who have surrendered. Karma affects the ending the player experiences. As players progress, they can find collectible items such as diary entries and postcards, which provide additional narrative lore to the game.

== Synopsis ==
=== Setting and characters ===
Metro Exodus is set in 2035, one year after the events of Metro: Last Light, on a post-apocalyptic Earth that has been devastated by a nuclear war. Many parts of the world are uninhabitable due to radiation, forcing humans to create communities to survive, and split into factions both peaceful and hostile, who often fight against one another and against aggressive mutant creatures that roam the surface and underground. The game continues the story from Metro: Last Light's "Redemption" ending. As in the two preceding games, the player assumes the role of Artyom, who flees the Moscow Metro and sets off on a locomotive called the Aurora with his allies on a journey to the Far East. The story takes place over one year, starting with a harsh nuclear winter in the Metro. Anna, another major character in the preceding game and the book Metro 2035, is now Artyom's wife. Miller, Anna's father and leader of the militaristic Spartan Order in previous games and novels, returns. Artyom's Spartan comrades include Alyosha, Damir, Duke, Idiot, Sam, Stepan, and Tokarev. Other characters who join the Aurora crew during their journey include an engineer named Yermak, a nurse named Katya, Katya's daughter Nastya, and a mechanic named Krest.

=== Plot ===
After the battle at D6, Artyom leaves the Spartan Order, disillusioned with the constant infighting and corruption within the Metro. He obsesses with proving other humans outside of Moscow have survived and makes numerous expeditions to the surface, despite Anna and Miller insisting it is futile. During an expedition with Anna, they witness a train running on the surface. Before they can follow it, they are captured by Hansa soldiers, who shoot Artyom and take Anna hostage. Artyom survives the shooting; he follows the soldiers to rescue Anna and inadvertently destroys a signal jammer that was blocking all radio communications between Moscow and the outside world. Radio transmissions begin to be received, and Artyom and Anna realize humanity has not gone extinct. They escape by stealing one of Hansa's locomotives that they later name Aurora.

As the train leaves, the Spartan Order moves in to retake it, and are shocked by Artyom's and Anna's presence. Knowing Hansa will kill all of them for knowing the truth, Miller concludes the Spartans' best chance of survival is to flee Moscow. Outside the city, Miller tells the others that while many of Russia's cities were bombed, the war did not end and NATO has occupied the remains of the nation. To prevent NATO from attacking Moscow, the Russian leadership decided to secretly jam all communications to make the outside world believe nobody had survived. They receive a radio broadcast from Moscow Defense Command calling for survivors to rally at the "Ark", which is located at Mount Yamantau. Miller decides to go there, believing it is where the Russian government has rebuilt itself.

After crossing the Volga River controlled by a technophobic cult, acquiring a passenger cart and a railcar in the process, the Spartans reach the Yamantau base, only to discover its service-and-construction crew have devolved into insane cannibals who lure survivors with the false promise of safety. Artyom and the Spartans fight their way out and escape. Using a map they recovered from Yamantau, they travel to a satellite communications center in the dried-out Caspian Sea, which is now controlled by slavers, hoping to gain access to satellite scans and find habitable land to settle. After helping the local resistance fight the slavers and obtaining fuel and water supplies, the Spartans move on. As they continue their journey, Anna falls ill from previously breathing poisonous gas at the Volga. They scout a nearby taiga forest valley to see if it is suitable to settle, encountering a tribe of local survivors called the "Children of the Forest". The Spartans find the dam protecting the valley from radiation is about to break, making the area uninhabitable. When Artyom returns to the train, he finds Anna's condition has worsened.

The Spartans detour to the heavily-irradiated city of Novosibirsk, where an antidote for Anna may be found. Despite the risk, Miller and Artyom head into the city alone. They enter the Novosibirsk Metro and find a young boy named Kirill, the last Novosibirsk survivor, who explains his father left on a mission to obtain a map marking a clean, habitable area. Miller and Artyom split up; Miller goes to find the map and Artyom searches for the antidote. Artyom finds it, but a mutant gravely wounds him and he absorbs a heavy dose of radiation. Artyom, Miller, and Kirill head for the train with the map and the antidote; on the return journey, Miller uses a dose of anti-radiation serum meant for himself to save Artyom, and dies of radiation poisoning. The rest of the Spartans donate blood to give Artyom a critical transfusion. Anna is cured and with the map, the Spartans settle on the shores of Lake Baikal, which is free from radiation.

Artyom's fate depends on the choices the player made during the journey; In the bad ending Artyom dies, the Spartans and a grieving Anna hold a funeral for him, and Artyom and Miller's spirits awaken on a dilapidated version of the Aurora, remaining for eternity in ghostly purgatory. In the good ending, Artyom survives, Miller is buried, and Artyom is selected to replace him as leader of the Spartan Order. Now with a radiation-free home, Artyom plans to return to Moscow and reveal the truth of the world to the people of the Metro.

=== The Two Colonels ===
While Artyom goes to find the cure for Anna's illness in Novosibirsk, Miller retraces the steps of Kirill's father Colonel Vyacheslav "Slava" Khlebnikov to find the satellite map. One year prior, Slava works as a soldier protecting the Novosibirsk Metro while raising Kirill. At the same time, the Novosibirsk Metro government (OSKOM) is planning to evacuate the Metro but there is insufficient anti-radiation serum to protect the entire population. OSKOM confiscates serum from civilians, causing unrest. Civil war breaks out in the Metro, forcing Slava to defend OSKOM headquarters from the rebels. Slava's superior, General Anatoliy "Tolya" Vinogradov, deploys poison gas during the battle. When Slava confronts him for this, Tolya reveals OSKOM leadership has already taken the remaining serum and fled, but not before flooding the Metro with poison gas to kill the rest of the population. Tolya, bitter at being left behind, destroys the OSKOM evacuation train before committing suicide upon learning of his son's death. With no other choice, Slava descends into a mutant-infested bunker to retrieve the map leading to Lake Baikal and escape the city with Kirill. He finds the map but succumbs to radiation poisoning after losing his dose of serum. In the present, Miller enters the bunker, and finds Slava's body and the map. He tells Slava he did not die in vain and promises to evacuate Kirill from Novosibirsk before leaving.

=== Sam's Story ===
After the Spartan Order settles in Lake Baikal, one of the Spartans, former Marine Security Guard Samuel "Sam" Taylor, decides to return to his home in San Diego to see if his father survived the nuclear war. Sam travels to the port city of Vladivostok where he meets Captain Eduard "Ed" Baranov. Baranov directs Sam to an intact nuclear submarine named the Mayflower, which can take Sam back to the United States. Sam is captured and brought to Tom, a fellow American. Tom says he was an arms dealer left stranded in Russia after the nuclear attacks, and asks Sam to find Ed, who is the only person who knows how to refuel the Mayflower. Ed does not trust Tom's intentions with the Mayflower, especially because it is still armed with nuclear missiles and his crew is missing, but Sam persuades Ed to negotiate a deal with Tom. Sam and Ed travel to a nearby abandoned naval base to recover the fuel rods needed to power the Mayflower. Ed, who is still mistrustful of Tom, asks Sam to sabotage the submarine, even if it means sacrificing his chance to return home. Tom's lieutenant Klim betrays him and attacks the Mayflower, forcing Sam, Ed, and Tom to work together. Sam kills Klim and the Mayflower sets sail from the port. Sam can choose whether to sabotage the Mayflower or leave it intact.

If Sam does not sabotage the Mayflower, Tom takes him to San Diego as promised with the firepower of the vessel at his command. If Sam sabotages the Mayflower, it explodes and sinks, killing both Ed and Tom. Sam remains in Vladivostok but is happy knowing nobody can use the nuclear weapons the Mayflower was carrying and resolves to find another way to return home.

== Development ==
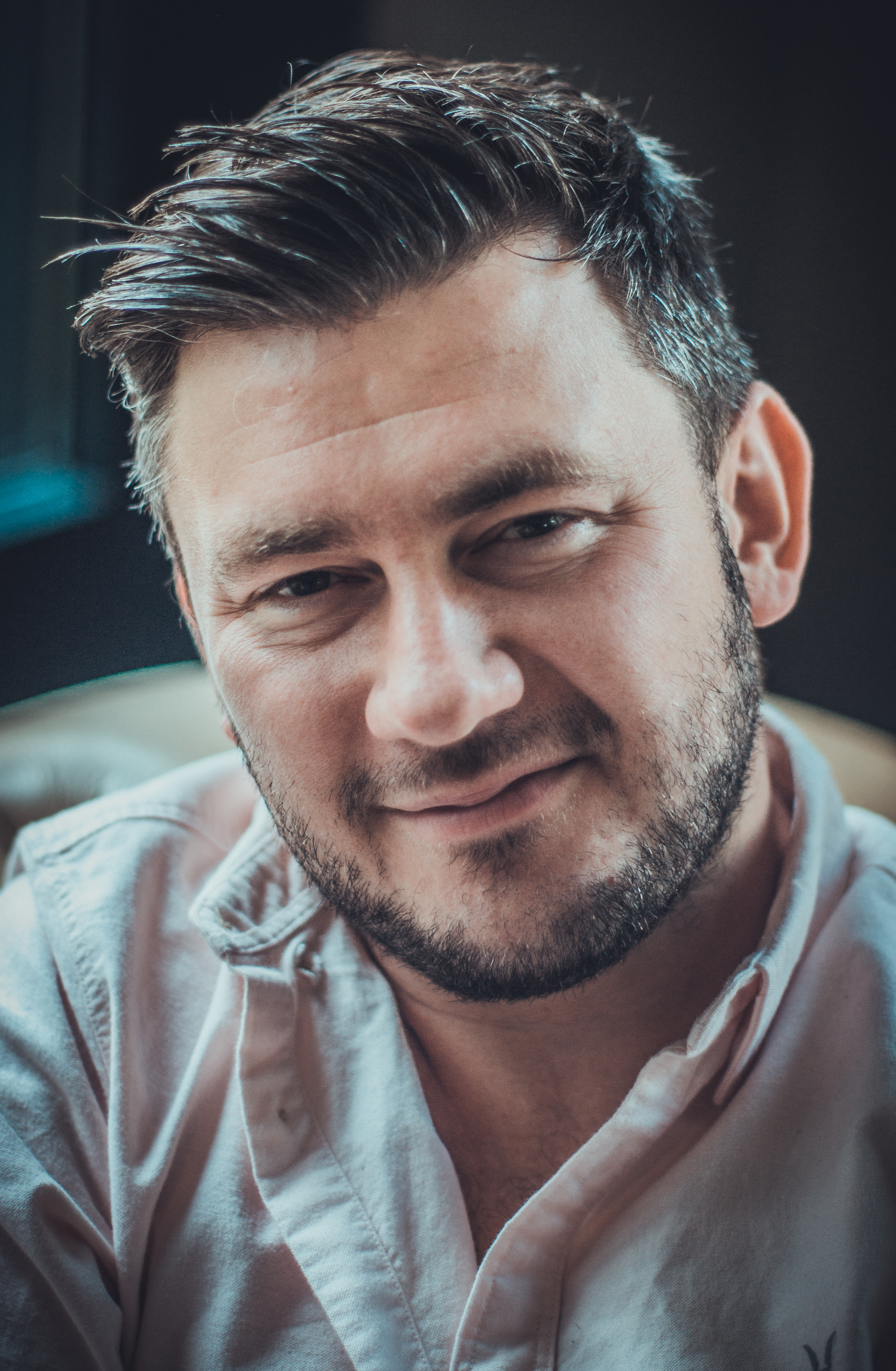
The developers partnered with franchise creator Dmitry Glukhovsky to create the game's narrative.

Metro Exodus was developed by a 150-strong team of developers at 4A Games, which was based in Kyiv, Ukraine, and Malta. Development of the game began in 2014. Andrew Prokhorov served as the game's director. 4A worked with Dmitry Glukhovsky, the franchise's creator, to write the game's story.

Following the release of the linear, story-driven games Metro 2033 and Metro: Last Light, the developers received feedback from players who wanted larger levels and more exploration. The team remembered their experience of working at GSC Game World on S.T.A.L.K.E.R.: Shadow of Chernobyl (2007), which has emergent gameplay and large, explorable spaces. The developers wanted to introduce the freeform gameplay of S.T.A.L.K.E.R. into Exodus, effectively blending the two games. Prokhorov and his team underestimated the difficulty of the task and they spent between two and three years trying to balance open-ended gameplay with storytelling. Prokhorov compared the structure of the game to that of an accordion because the design of the game's levels alternates between open and linear. According to 4A, Exodus is bigger than 2033 and Last Light combined. The developers described these large areas as "survival sandbox" levels, which adopt more survival elements than its more-linear counterparts. The development team was excited by the change in the game's direction, which allowed them to create more-diverse maps and locations than those of its predecessors, which are set nearly entirely in subway tunnels.

Despite the game's increased scope, the developers avoided deploying a full open world in Exodus because they deemed it would negatively affect the game's storytelling. The developers avoided introducing common open-world game elements such as side missions and fetch quests. Instead of relying on quest markers and waypoints, the developers hoped to pique player's curiosity and incentivize them to explore by creating visually interesting landmarks that can be seen from afar. Global brand manager Huw Beynon described the game as a "thinking person's shooter". The developers hoped to evoke feelings of being lost and alone with Exodus, and to reward players for "thinking before shooting" and "exploring off the beaten path". To make the gaming experience immersive, information typically told through a head up display (HUD) was physicalized through Artyom's gears and equipment. For instance, instead of placing a minimap on-screen, Artyom pulls from his backpack a physical map of the location attached to a leather binder for players to view. To accommodate the more-open levels, the developers overhauled the game's artificial intelligence system. For instance, human enemies are better coordinated, sharing with each other information about the player's location. Mutants and monsters also interact with each other.

Exodus is a sequel to the book Metro 2035, which is a sequel to Last Light. Glukhovsky was a consultant for 4A, working closely with the studio to ensure that the game's tone matched with that of the books. Glukhovsky gave 4A freedom to create the game's narrative but he occasionally clashed with them when they rejected his suggestions due to resources or technical limitations. According to the developers, the game's script was twice as long as those of 2033 and Last Light combined, and much of it was described as "ancillary". The developers wanted to write dialogue for the game's non-playable characters, including enemy conversations, that players can overhear from afar. While these dialogues are inconsequential to the game's overarching story, the developers believed they made the characters more alive, enhancing player immersion. According to Glukhovsky, Exodus's story is more personal than those of earlier games in the series, focusing on Artyom and his relationship with his wife Anna and his father-in-law Colonel Miller.

== Release ==
4A Games and publisher Deep Silver announced Metro Exodus on 11 June 2017 at Microsoft's press conference during E3. The game was Initially due to be released in late 2018 but it was delayed to avoid competition with other prominent titles. Development of the game was completed on 2 December 2018, when 4A games announced it had been declared gold, indicating it was being prepared for duplication and release. The game was released for PlayStation 4, Microsoft Windows, and Xbox One on 15 February 2019, which was followed by a Google Stadia version on 19 November 2019 as part of that system's launch. Linux and macOS versions were released on 14 April 2021. In addition to the game's standard edition, players can purchase the "Aurora Limited Edition", which includes a steelbook case, an artbook, and an expansion pass. Deep Silver also released a "Spartan Collector’s Edition", which includes a statuette of Artyom and other items.

On 28 January 2019, it was announced the Windows release would be exclusive to the Epic Games Store for one year; the publisher cited the platform's more-favorable revenue split. The game's pre-sales were discontinued on Steam following the announcement and existing Steam digital purchases were still fulfilled. The decision caused controversy and resulted in a large number of players calling for a boycott of the game, and review bombing the franchise's previous games on Steam. Valve wrote on the game's Steam page the game's removal from the storefront was "unfair", especially after a long pre-sales period. One of the game's developers was criticised in the gaming press for stating on a forum if Metro Exodus did not sell well on the Epic Games Store, its sequels may become console exclusives. In a statement, 4A Games said these views did not represent those of the company. Metro Exodus was released on Steam on 15 February 2020.

In March 2019, 4A Games released a patch named "Ranger Update" that introduced a New Game Plus mode in which players can modify individual gameplay elements such as persistent radiation and the number of weapons Artyom can carry. It also features developer commentary in the form of a collectible named Green Tape Players. Two expansions for the game were released; the first expansion, The Two Colonels, which was released in August 2019, features claustrophobic environments that are similar to those of the first two games in the series. It serves as a prequel to the game and follows Colonel Khlebnikov as he attempts to reunite with his son Kirill in Novosibirsk on New Year's Eve. The second expansion, Sam's Story, which features larger, more-open levels like Exodus, was released on 11 February 2020. The expansion follows an American marine named Sam, who must attempt to reach the harbor of Vladivostok and return to the US.

An upgraded version of the game titled Metro Exodus Enhanced Edition, which supports ray tracing and global illumination, was released for Microsoft Windows on 6 May 2021, and for PlayStation 5 and Xbox Series X/S on 18 June 2021. It was released as a free upgrade for all owners of the original version.

In January 2023, 4A Games released the game's software development kit for owners of Metro Exodus.

== Reception ==
=== Critical reception ===
Reception

Aggregate score
| Aggregator | Score |
|---|---|
| Metacritic | PC: 82/100; PS4: 80/100; XONE: 82/100; PC (Complete Edition): 85/100; PS5: 83/100; XSX: 81/100 |

Review scores
| Publication | Score |
|---|---|
| Game Informer | 8.75/10 |
| GameSpot | 8/10 |
| GamesRadar+ | 4.5/5 |
| IGN | 8.5/10 |
| PC Gamer (US) | 78/100 |

Metro Exodus was released to "generally favourable" reviews, according to the review aggregator website Metacritic. The game was nominated for "Best Action Game" at The Game Awards 2019. It was also nominated for "Outstanding Technical Achievement" at the 23rd Annual D.I.C.E. Awards, and "Technical Achievement" at the 16th British Academy Games Awards.

Critics generally liked the game's more-open structure. Writing for Game Informer, Matt Bertz praised the diverse biomes in the game, which kept the experience fresh as it introduced new characters, enemies, and factions as players progressed. He described the game's pacing as its "greatest triumph" because none of the large region overstays its welcome. Austin Wood from GamesRadar called the locations in the game "gorgeous" and said he liked the way the linear-story setpieces and open levels complement each other. He chose the two larger levels Caspian Sea and the Volga River as one of the game's strongest points. Michael Higham from GameSpot, however, was disappointed players were not rewarded for exploring the game's world, and that engaging in combat with mutants is a waste of time because they do not drop resources like their human counterparts. Both Bertz and Higham noted Artyom's movement is slow, a problem that is further aggravated by the larger levels. Andy Kelly from PC Gamer praised 4A's approach to open-world design for prioritizing attention to details over size.

Gameplay received a generally positive reception. Wood described the gameplay as "a varied mix of rock-solid gunplay and tense stealth missions". Higham praised the game's level design for allowing players to choose how they want to approach an objective. The weapon-customization system was also praised for allowing players to experiment, making combat flexible. Tristian Oglivie from IGN called the gameplay "refreshing" for encouraging and rewarding players to take their time and plan before attack. Kelly criticized the gameplay for being simplistic, summarizing the game as "a pretty rote FPS attached to a setting that deserves much better". The game was praised for its immersive gameplay. Oglivie praised its avoidance of menus and on-screen markers for grounding players in the game's world. In addition, he added by withholding information about locations of interest, players are more likely to explore locations out of curiosity. Brendan Lowry from Windows Central praised 4A's decision to turn gameplay systems into physical interactions within the game's world, which contributes to an "incredibly immersive" experience.

The game's story generally received positive reviews. Bertz compared the game's campaign to the Wolfenstein games developed by MachineGames, though he said subpar performances from the cast hinder the emotional impact of certain scenes. Higham said the story is more grounded than that of its predecessor, and that Metro Exodus forgoes the supernatural elements for a more personal story. He also praised the game's characters and wrote the "best parts of the story" can be found in the locomotive, interacting with Artyom's crew, which adds moments of levity to the game. Astrid Johnson from Polygon wrote unlike the series' earlier games, Exodus injects the story with hope, and interacting with other characters on the train is "captivating" because it juxtaposes with the game's bleak setting. Oglivie liked the game's story but said it does not have a central threat and that the ending "grinds to a halt". Critics criticized Artyom's status as a silent protagonist. Kelly praised the game's use of environment to tell side stories, describing them as "vivid". While he praised the game's environments and atmosphere for evoking a pervading sense of "hopelessness and melancholy", he said the game loses its identity when it is no longer set underground.

=== Sales ===
In the United Kingdom, Metro Exodus debuted at number two in the weekly sales charts, where it sold 50% more units than its predecessor Metro: Last Light. In Japan, the PS4 version sold approximately 17,513 physical units during its launch week, making it the seventh best-selling retail game of any format. The game debuted at number one in the weekly Switzerland retail charts. Exodus was the ninth best-selling video game in the United States in February 2019; its sales in its launch month set a new record for the series.

Up to the end of its release quarter on 31 March 2019, Metro Exodus generated €58 million for publisher Deep Silver. THQ Nordic, Deep Silver's parent company, said while physical sales performed in line with management's expectations, the game's digital sales exceeded it. According to CEO Lars Wingefors, the "absolute majority" of the game's sales came from console players. After its release on Steam on 15 February 2020, the game sold more than 200,000 units within two days. By February 2022, the game had sold six million units. By March 2023, it had sold over 8.5 million units. As of February 2024, it has sold over 10 million units.

== Sequel ==
In November 2020, 4A Games announced it was working on a sequel to Metro Exodus. Glukhovsky will be involved in the game's development. The sequel, titled Metro 2039, was officially announced in April 2026.
