= Jiizas: di Buk We Luuk Rait bout Im =

Jiizas: di Buk We Luuk Rait bout Im is a translation of the Gospel of Luke from the Biblical Greek version of the Bible into Jamaican Patois. The work was spearheaded by the Bible Society of West Indies, headquartered in Kingston, Jamaica. The translation was published in print and audio formats in summer 2010. It served as a precursor for Di Jamiekan Nyuu Testiment, which was launched in the United Kingdom and in Jamaica in 2012 - the year in which Jamaica celebrated its fiftieth anniversary of independence from Britain. The Luuk Buk Project falls within the Bible Society of the West Indies' larger translation endeavour, known as the Jamaican Creole Translation Project.

== Example ==
A translation of Luke 1:28, when the angel Gabriel first visits the virgin Mary.

Jamaican Patois Di ienjel go tu Mieri an se u ar se, 'Mieri, mi av nyuuz we a go mek yu wel api. Gad riili riili bles yu an im a waak wid yu all di taim.	English - King James Version And the angel came in unto her, and said, Hail, thou that art highly favoured, the Lord is with thee.	New Testament Greek καὶ εἰσελθὼν πρὸς αὐτὴν εἶπεν· χαῖρε, κεχαριτωμένη, ὁ κύριος μετὰ σοῦ.
