= Dictionary of American Regional English =

Regional North American English dictionary

- Dictionary of American Regional English cover
- Volume I (1985), Volume II (1991), Volume III (1996), Volume IV (2002), Volume V (2012), Volume VI (2013), Digital Version (2013)
- Country: United States
- Language: American English
- Genre: Dictionary, reference work
- Publisher: Belknap Press of Harvard University Press

The Dictionary of American Regional English (DARE) is a scholarly dictionary documenting regional and social variation in American English. It focuses on words, senses, and usages whose distribution varies geographically or among social groups in the United States, drawing on both nationwide fieldwork and historical and contemporary written sources. Its five alphabetical text volumes, covering A–Z, were published between 1985 and 2012; a sixth companion volume of maps, indexes, questionnaire material, and fieldwork data followed in 2013, and a digital edition was launched that December.

The project grew out of the American Dialect Society's longstanding aim, dating from its founding in 1889, to produce a dictionary of American regional speech. Work took its modern form after Frederic G. Cassidy was appointed chief editor in 1962. Between 1965 and 1970, trained fieldworkers interviewed 2,777 informants in 1,002 communities across the United States, producing about 2.3 million responses to a questionnaire on everyday vocabulary and usage. The survey material was supplemented by a large reading programme drawing on sources including newspapers, diaries, letters, histories, biographies, novels, and government documents.

DARE uses distribution maps and regional and social labels to show where particular forms were recorded and which groups used them. Its digital version also provides searchable entry data, fieldwork maps, demographic information, and more than 5,000 audio clips from the original interviews. Since 2015, the project has continued to publish new and substantially revised entries for incorporation into the digital edition.

== History ==
In 1889, when Joseph Wright began editing the English Dialect Dictionary (EDD), a group of American philologists founded the American Dialect Society with the ultimate purpose of producing a similar work for the United States. Members of the Society began to collect material, much of which was published in the Society's journal Dialect Notes, but little was done toward compiling a dictionary recording nationwide usage until Frederic G. Cassidy was appointed Chief Editor in 1962. Cassidy had done fieldwork in Wisconsin for the Linguistic Atlas of the North Central States project and in Jamaica for his Dictionary of Jamaican English. With the assistance of Audrey Duckert, he had also designed and administered an intensive mail-questionnaire survey of Wisconsin (the Wisconsin English Language Survey). Drawing on this experience, he and Duckert made plans for a nationwide, fieldworker-administered questionnaire that would provide a comprehensive foundation for the projected Dictionary.

The fieldwork, supported by a grant from the Office of Education, was conducted between 1965 and 1970. About eighty fieldworkers (mostly graduate students, but also some professors) were trained in phonetic transcription and fieldwork techniques; they were then sent to 1,002 carefully selected communities across the country, chosen to reflect population density and to account for settlement history and immigration patterns. Each fieldworker was required to find "informants", people willing to provide information about words, who were natives of their communities and who had lived there all, or almost all, their lives. The informants were then asked to answer the questions in the DARE questionnaire. In many communities more than one person contributed answers, so the total number of informants, 2,777, is much larger than the number of communities.

While the fieldworkers were interviewing people across the country, Cassidy and others in Madison organized an extensive volunteer reading program. Printed materials of all kinds were selected and sent to volunteers, who read them and identified regional words in context. These resources included historical and contemporary newspapers, diaries, letters, histories, biographies, novels, and government documents. A number of important unpublished collections of dialect materials were also donated to DARE for use in documenting the Dictionary entries.

As the fieldworkers sent their questionnaires back to Madison, the approximately 2.3 million answers were keypunched, and software was written to create a question-by-question tabulation of responses as well as an index. In addition, programs were written that allowed the interactive creation of maps showing where the responses were found and the production of statistical tables itemizing the age, sex, race, education level, and community type for each person who gave a particular response. These tools allow DARE editors to apply regional labels to entries based on where words were collected in the fieldwork project and to use social labels describing individuals who use those words.

In 1974, Cassidy contracted with Harvard University Press to publish the Dictionary, and editing began in earnest in 1975. By 1980 it was clear that the idea of writing and publishing DARE as a single unit was impossible. Early estimates of the time it would take to write and revise entries had been overly optimistic. Following the tradition of other historical dictionaries such as the Oxford English Dictionary (OED), DARE decided to publish each volume as it was ready. Because Cassidy had contracted to supply the text of the Dictionary on magnetic tape fully coded for typesetting, with camera-ready maps, a production department had to be set up. A system was devised for coding the many specifications for format, type size and style, and special characters. Procedures were worked out for the meticulous checking and correcting of text that would be required.

== Features ==
=== Contents of volumes, maps, and labels ===
Six print volumes of the DARE have been published by Harvard University's Belknap Press. Volume I (1985) contains detailed introductory material, plus the letters A-C; Volume II (1991) covers the letters D-H; Volume III (1996) contains I-O; Volume IV (2002) includes P-Sk; and Volume V (2012) covers Sl-Z as well as a bibliography of nearly 13,000 sources cited in the five volumes. (Starting with Volume IV, digital libraries provided many valuable resources for expanding the historical coverage of the entries.) Volume VI (2013) includes more than 1,700 maps showing contrastive distributions of regional synonyms (such as hero, hoagie, grinder, sub, torpedo, poor boy, and Cuban, all of which describe a sandwich in a long bun), as well as social distributions of regional terms (by age, sex, race, education, and community type). It also includes an index to the regional, usage, and etymological labels used in the five text volumes; the text of the DARE Questionnaire; the responses by all DARE informants to 430 of the questions asked in the original fieldwork. The digital version was launched in December 2013.

The five text volumes contain approximately 60,000 headwords and senses in 5,544 pages. There are nearly 3,000 computer-generated distribution maps included in the text, showing where the words were found during the fieldwork. The first volume also includes 156 pages of introductory matter, with an extensive introduction, an explanation of DARE's regions and maps, an essay on how language changes, a guide to pronunciation, text of the questionnaire, and a list of informants (showing where and when they were interviewed, the community type, the person's age, sex, race, occupation, education, and whether the person made an audiotape).

An unusual feature of DARE is its inclusion of maps showing where words were found during the nationwide fieldwork. The maps are adjusted to reflect population density rather than geographic area, so they look a bit strange at first, but one learns to "read" them quickly. Whenever possible, the editors apply regional labels to the entries, based both on the maps from the field survey and on the written citations. (There are nearly forty regional labels listed in the front matter to Volume I, but the most frequently used in the text of the Dictionary tend to be from the "South," "South Midland," "North," "New England," "Northeast," "West," "Gulf States," and "southern Appalachians.") Since language is not restricted by state or regional boundaries, the labels often include qualifying language, such as "chiefly N[ew] Eng[land]," or "scattered, but most freq[uent] S[ou]th, S[outh] Midl[and]." If the evidence from the fieldwork shows that a term is used disproportionately frequently by a particular social group (based on age, sex, race, education, or community type), a "social" label such as "old-fash[ioned]," "chiefly among women," or "esp[ecially] freq[uent] among Black speakers" will also be applied.

The digital version is available by subscription (for libraries or individuals) and perpetual access (libraries). In addition to the Basic Search, which yields both headwords and variant forms, an Advanced Search function allows Boolean searches of full text, headwords, parts of speech, variant forms, definitions, etymologies, quotations, and regional or social labels. Quotations link directly to specific entries in the bibliography, where users can link to every other quotation from that particular source.

The digital DARE also offers features based on the original fieldwork survey:

- Users can click on a state on the DARE map, or select from any of 41 regions in a pull-down menu (e.g., Appalachians, Desert Southwest, Gulf States, North Central, South Atlantic), to get to a link to "View all entries for [that state or region]." Because language does not adhere to state or regional boundaries, the user is also guided to a list of larger regions of which the state or region is a part, with links to searches for additional words characteristic of that area.
- All entries that include quotations based on the DARE survey have links to the questions cited in the entry. Clicking a link allows the user to go to the DARE map and call up any response (or group of responses) to that question. By mapping selected synonyms, the user can see regional distributions instantaneously. Users can also see the social distributions (by age, sex, race, education, and community type) of the people who offered a given response. Scholars who want to see the raw demographic data can download it as an Excel spreadsheet.
- More than 5,000 audio clips from the original DARE interviews are included in entries. Users can click on audio icons to hear bits of conversation recorded between 1965 and 1970 with people from all corners of the US.
- From the Results List of a search, users can filter the entries based on their inclusion of an audio clip, a DARE map, or a quotation from the DARE survey. Within the DARE Survey tab, searches can be refined by specific variables within the categories of age, sex, race, education, and community type.

Users who visit the digital website without a subscription can browse the headwords through a "Word Wheel," designed to replicate the serendipity of flipping through the pages of a print dictionary. (Within the Word Wheel are 100 entries highlighted in gold, which can be viewed without cost.) They can do a search for headwords from a state or region and see the results list, but they cannot click on the results and go to the full entries. They can also search the bibliography.

In addition to a history of the DARE project and its fieldwork, it includes introductory matter from the first print volume, an Index of virtually all the regional, social, usage, and etymological labels in the five volumes of text, a pronunciation guide and abbreviation list, the Questionnaire and List of Informants, and all the contrastive maps that are included in Volume VI of the print version of DARE. There is an "Introduction to Contrastive Maps," followed by about 1,400 geographic maps showing regional synonyms for various concepts, and more than 300 maps showing differences in usage by people according to their age, sex, race, education, and community type. An index follows, with all the words that are mapped, making it easy to start with a question about a specific term and go directly to a regional or social map.

=== Informants ===
Some 2,777 people in 1,002 American communities served as DARE informants by answering all or part of the DARE questionnaire. Each person was a native of the selected community and had lived there all (or almost all) his or her life. The "List of Informants" in the front matter to Volume I of DARE includes the following details for each participant: informant code (a state abbreviation and a number, e.g., AL001 for the first informant interviewed in Alabama); community name; community type (urban, large city, small city, village, rural); age group (60 or older=old, 40–59=middle-aged, 18–39=young); year of birth; year of interview; education level (unknown; less than grade five; at least grade five; at least two years of high school; at least two years of college or vocational school); occupation; sex; race; and whether the informant made an audiotape recording. At the end of the "List of Informants" is a supplementary list of people who made audiotape recordings but who did not answer any parts of the questionnaire.

Fieldworkers were asked to weight their selection of informants toward older people in an effort to collect words for objects and practices that were going out of use. As a result, 66% of the DARE informants were over 60 when interviewed between 1965 and 1970; 24% were middle-aged; and 10% were young. Knowing the proportion of informants from each age group who gave a particular response and contrasting that to the proportion of informants from each age group who answered that particular question allows DARE editors to detect which words appear to be old-fashioned and which are coming into greater use.

=== Questionnaire ===
The DARE questionnaire included a total of 1,847 questions; some that proved not to be fruitful in the early interviews were dropped, with others being added in their place. The questionnaire aimed to elicit responses about the everyday activities in Americans' lives. It includes 41 sections, starting with the neutral subjects of time and weather and moving to more personal subjects such as religion and health. Also included are the questions used in the early questionnaire only. The text of each question is included in the front matter to Volume I, and the quotations in the text of the Dictionary usually include full or abbreviated versions of each question; in cases where only the question number is cited, a reader can refer to the front matter. The categories are listed below:

- Time
- Weather
- Topography
- Houses
- Furniture
- Utensils
- Dishes
- Foods
- Vegetables and Fruit
- Domestic Animals
- Farm Animals
- Farming
- Farm Buildings
- Vehicles and Transportation
- Boats and Sailing
- Fishing, Hunting, Wildlife
- Birds
- Insects
- Wildflowers, Weeds
- Trees, Bushes, etc.
- Buying and Selling, Money
- Honesty and Dishonesty
- Clothing, Men's and Women's
- Parts of the Body
- Physical Actions
- Family Relationships
- Courtship, Marriage, Childbearing
- Health and Disease
- Religion and Beliefs
- Tobacco, Liquor
- Children's Games
- Entertainments and Celebrations
- Emotional States and Attitudes
- Types and Attitudes of People
- Relationships among People
- Schoolgoing, Mental Actions
- Manner of Action or Being
- Size, Quantity and Number
- Position
- Exclamations
- Verbs Forms (these are scattered throughout the questionnaire)

=== Audiotape recordings ===
In addition to responding to the DARE questionnaire, informants were invited to make audiotape recordings in which they both read a set passage and conversed informally about any topic of their choice. The use of the reading passage, a contrived story called "Arthur the Rat" that was designed to elicit all significant pronunciation variants in American English, allows comparison of sounds in the same context from places all across the country. The use of free conversation elicited the introduction of topics not covered in the questionnaire, resulting in a corpus of informal speech that can be contrasted to the formal style of the reading passage. It also provides an extremely valuable oral history of mid-20th-century America.

In all, 1,843 DARE informants agreed to make audiotape recordings. They are noted in the "List of Informants" in the front matter to Volume I of DARE, in the last column, marked "Audiotape."

In a project with the Max Kade Institute for German-American Studies, the Center for the Study of Upper Midwestern Cultures, and the University of Wisconsin Digital Collection Center, DARE has made its collection of readings of "Arthur the Rat" available for listeners. (This collaborative project was funded by the Institute for Museum and Library Services.) These recordings have been posted at "American Languages: Our Nation's Many Voices" website. In addition, samples of informal conversation from the DARE audiotapes may be heard at "American Languages: Our Nation's Many Voices Online" website. Additional excerpts will be added as time permits.

== New research ==
In order to determine how vocabulary use has changed since the original fieldwork was done, DARE staff in 2013 undertook a pilot survey in Wisconsin ("2013–14 survey"), preliminary to an anticipated new nationwide survey. The updated survey did not use face-to-face interviews with fieldworkers, but instead invited people to answer questions on a website developed by DARE and the University of Wisconsin Survey Center. The new questionnaire, modeled closely on the original, omitted questions for items that are obsolete, updated some terminology, and added questions for items that did not exist in the late 1960s. The survey targeted the original 22 Wisconsin communities, asking residents who had lived there all their lives to participate by answering as many of the 41 sections of the questionnaire as they chose. In addition, new communities, selected as representative of the state on the basis of the 2010 Census, were also targeted. In those communities, residents had to have lived there only fifteen years. Other Wisconsin residents were invited to participate, but their responses have been kept separate from those from "official" respondents. Results of the online survey may be seen at dare.wisc.edu/survey-results.

== Quarterly updates ==
Beginning in summer 2015, DARE staff members began publishing quarterly updates on the project website. These include both new and significantly revised entries. Harvard University Press will incorporate them in annual updates to the digital version.

== Funding ==
DARE has been supported financially by the National Endowment for the Humanities (NEH), the National Science Foundation, the Andrew W. Mellon Foundation, other private foundations, and many individuals. The DARE offices are located in the English Department at the University of Wisconsin–Madison, and the university has provided generous support, particularly in the form of funding for graduate assistants.

On 5 November 2017, Douglas Belkin, in The Wall Street Journal, reported that the Dictionary of American Regional English "has rung the knell, sugared off, finished out the row", meaning it is shutting down, closing shop. However, the quarterly updates have continued since then.

== See also ==
- American English
- American Dialect Society
- Frederic G. Cassidy

== Bibliography ==
- Chiasson, Dan (November 2012). "The humble vernacular : a word-of-mouth dictionary". Reviews. Harper's Magazine. Vol. 325, no. 1950. pp. 90–94. Review of Volume V : Sl-Z.
- Dictionary of American Regional English, Volume I, A-C, Ed. Frederic G. Cassidy. Cambridge, Massachusetts: Belknap Press of Harvard University Press 1985, ISBN 0-674-20511-1; Volume II, D-H, Eds. Frederic G. Cassidy and Joan Houston Hall. Cambridge, Massachusetts: Belknap Press of Harvard University Press 1991, ISBN 0-674-20512-X; Volume III, I-O, Eds. Frederic G. Cassidy and Joan Houston Hall. Cambridge, Massachusetts: Belknap Press of Harvard University Press 1996, ISBN 0-674-20519-7; Volume IV, P-Sk, Ed. Joan Houston Hall. Cambridge, Massachusetts: Belknap Press of Harvard University Press 2002, ISBN 0-674-00884-7; Volume V, Sl-Z, Ed. Joan Houston Hall. Cambridge, Massachusetts: Belknap Press of Harvard University Press 2012, ISBN 978-0-674-04735-8; Volume VI: Contrastive Maps, Index to Entry Labels, Questionnaire, and Fieldwork Data, Ed. Joan Houston Hall with Luanne von Schneidemesser. Cambridge, Massachusetts: Belknap Press of Harvard University Press 2013, ISBN 978-0-674-06653-3.
- Hall, Joan Houston. "The Dictionary of American Regional English." Language in the USA: Perspectives for the 21st Century. Eds. Edward Finegan, John Rickford. Cambridge: Cambridge University Press, 2004: 92–112.
- Harvard University Press. Flyer describing the Dictionary of American Regional English, 2005.
- An Index by Region, Usage, and Etymology to the Dictionary of American Regional English, Volumes I and II. Publication of the American Dialect Society 77 (1993). Tuscaloosa AL: University of Alabama Press.
- An Index by Region, Usage, and Etymology to the Dictionary of American Regional English, Volume III. Publication of the American Dialect Society 82 (1999). Durham NC: Duke University Press.
