= Lois Kelly Miller =

Jamaican actress (1917–2020)

- Born: Lois Kelly Miller; 15 October 1917
- Died: 8 April 2020 (aged 102) Gordon Town, Jamaica

Lois Kelly Miller, also spelled Lois Kelly-Miller and formerly known as Lois Kelly-Barrow, (15 October 1917 – 8 April 2020) was a Jamaican theatre and screen actress. She became a household name in Jamaica for her decades-long, professional career in theatre and pantomime, particularly with the Little Theatre Movement (LTM) National Pantomime. Kelly Miller was best known to international audiences for her role in the American film Meet Joe Black (1998) opposite Brad Pitt and Anthony Hopkins.

== Biography ==
Lois Kelly Miller was born on 15 October 1917, the daughter of businessman Lewis Kelly, who produced "Kelly's" soft drinks and syrups. During World War II, Kelly Miller went to London to study music in 1944 and 1945. Upon completion of her studies, Kelly Miller took a trans-Atlantic ship from the United Kingdom to return to Jamaica. However, during the trip, her ship was attacked and torpedoed by an enemy vessel. Lois Kelly Miller survived the attack, but suffered serious burns. However, two friends whom she was traveling with were killed, including the sister of Jamaican actress Carmen Lawrence (wife of Douglas Manley).

Kelly Miller was a member of a respected group of Jamaican theatre actors who emerged during the 1950s and 1960s. She was particularly known for her work with the Little Theatre Movement (LTM) National Pantomime. She co-wrote three of the LTM's annual theatre productions and performed in thirteen pantomimes. She worked alongside some of the most prominent figures in Jamaican theatre, including Louise Bennett-Coverley, Charles Hyatt, Oliver Samuels, and Ranny Williams. For example, Kelly Miller and Bennett-Coverley frequently worked together, starring opposite each other in the 1963, 1966, and 1973 LTM Pantomime productions of Queenie's Daughter. She and Bennett-Coverley also appeared together in "Pirate's Princess" pantomime. Her television credits included "Win Some Lose Some" on the Jamaica Broadcasting Corporation (JBC) with Leonie Forbes.

On screen, Lois Kelly Miller was best known for her role in the 1998 romantic fantasy film Meet Joe Black. The role included a lengthy hospital scene opposite Brad Pitt in which both actors conversed in Jamaican Patois.

Kelly Miller also appeared in Ecstasy, the debut play by playwright David Heron in 1997.

Lois Kelly Miller died at her home in Gordon Town, Saint Andrew Parish, just outside Kingston, on 8 April 2020, at the age of 102.
