= Escape to Last Man Peak =

1975 novel by Jean D'Costa

- Cover illustration of the paperback edition of Escape to Last Man Peak
- Author: Jean D'Costa
- Cover artist: Mike Bell/Ian Flemming & Assoc. Ltd
- Language: English/Jamaican Patois
- Genre: Social science fiction, adventure novel
- Publisher: Longman (Caribbean)
- Publication date: 1975 (first edition, paperback)
- Publication place: Jamaica
- Media type: Print (paperback)
- Pages: 179 pp (first edition, paperback)
- ISBN: 0-582-76575-7 (paperback edition)
- OCLC: 16482752

Escape to Last Man Peak is a popular Jamaican novel written by Jamaican author Jean D'Costa. First published in 1975, it chronicles the adventure of ten orphans who embark on a dangerous journey across Jamaica in search of a new home, after a deadly pneumonia epidemic kills the caretakers of their orphanage and propels the country into a state of anarchy and desolation.

Containing elements of social science fiction, the text examines genuine human nature in conditions of chaos and despair, and explores how determination and self-will can help people achieve the unthinkable. While narrated in standard English, the dialogue is written in Jamaican Creole (see Jamaican Patois). The novel was a standard text for English courses for first- or second-year high-school students, although it is now used less frequently. The novel is considered one of Jamaica's great works of fiction.

== Plot ==
At the beginning of the novel, the narrator, 11-year-old Nellie Atkins, as well as nine other children at the Sunrise Home Orphanage (Jimmy; Pauline; Sylvia; Wuss Wuss; Gerald; Frankie; Myrna; Pet and Precious) are informed by a policeman that the matron of their orphanage has died in the hospital from the pneumonia epidemic (referred to as "the sickness") that is raging through the country. Afraid that they will be made to work in a labour camp, the children are at first desolate; however they later learn that 11-year-old Wuss Wuss, a shy albino boy, is the secret owner of a house and a very large plot of land on the other side of the island called Last Man Peak, where he once lived with his grandfather.

Gathering the remains of food, clothing and other resources that they have left, the children skulk from the orphanage before dawn the following day. They first visit their neighbor Mr. Henry, who lives about half a mile away, and he explains that his wife has died, and that he has also caught the virus. He entrusts his large Alsatian-Labrador mix Bess to Jimmy with commands for her to "guard" and follow Jimmy. After a tearful goodbye, the children set off to their other remaining friend, the old Teacher Mack. Teacher Mack gives the children useful advise on how to travel, and the route they are to take, and repeatedly cautions them to avoid being seen by others.

After the children leave Teacher Mack, they trudge onward through fields and forest lands, and at nightfall, sleep in an old deserted hut by the path. During the night, Nellie and Jimmy hear footsteps outside and realize that someone has seen them; however, Bess' barking chases the assailants away. The following day, the children hear the sounds of drumming and singing, and are soon approached by a group of mysterious people dressed in white robes. The group, which is really a cult that believes that sacrificing children can prevent/cure the sickness, attacks the children. While the children eventually escape, Bess is stabbed at the neck (although the wound is shallow as her collar deflected the knife's impact), and Wuss Wuss is injured. Later, the children face more danger when a woman begins to shoot at them with a rifle.

Increasing threats of human confrontation force the group of children to forge a path along a more hilly and shrubbery terrain. Someone then notices that Bess is missing, and the group begins to contemplate whether it is safe to even continue on the journey. While resting near a ravine, Wuss Wuss claims he hears a baby crying, and is determined to go into the ravine to investigate. There they discover Bess, a donkey, a small boy of about seven years old, and a baby all partially submerged in a pool at the bottom of the ravine. Wuss Wuss acts at once, and with the help of Nellie and Pauline, saves the two children from drowning, and the group is reunited with Bess. The following day, the children are surprised to meet a friendly Rastafarian and self-proclaimed prophet named Isaiah at Brown's Town, Saint Ann, and he, along with his neighbors Mr and Mrs Jarrett, offer the children refuge for a day. They hold a feast for the children, which the entire community attends, and they hail the children as a sign of "better things to come". On their departure the next day, Isaiah and the Jarretts give the children food and water for the next stage of their journey, and two calves, as a Christmas gift.

At Goodhope, a town located a few miles from Last Man Peak, the children learn that a dangerous gang, known as the "Goodhope Boys", who have been looting and attacking and people, are living in an old abandoned hotel by the side of the road. As the group deduces, it would be dangerous to steal past the hotel, since they may be discovered and followed to as far as Last Man Peak, and would never feel safe from future attack. However, Gerald formulates a plan that he believes will ensure the group's safe passage to Last Man Peak. In the pitch dark of the night, while the Goodhope Boys prepares to sleep, the older children masquerade themselves in glowing, scary outfits, and with Bess and the animals, perform a strident, eerie song and dance on the front lawn. Believing the raucous to be the work of ghosts, the Goodhope Boys flee their home in terror.

The next day, on Christmas Eve, approximately two weeks after the children of Sunrise Home began their journey, they reach their destination.

== Characters ==
- Nellie Atkins
- James "Jimmy" Anderson
- Myrna Campbell
- Ronald
- Pauline Jenkins
- Franklyn "Frankie" Phipps
- Prince "Wuss-Wuss" Jones
- Sylvia Chin
- Gerald Lambert
- Teacher Mack
- Mr. Henry
- Petisha "Pet" King
- Precious King
- Andrew "Fudge" George
- Bess
- Pocomanian Dancers
- Police Man
- Matron
- Isaiah the Prophet

== Background and theme ==
D'Costa is a linguistic scholar who specializes in Caribbean language and vernacular, and the language dynamics of Escape to Last Man Peak has received praise from various critics. While the narrative of Escape to Last Man Peak is written in standard English, the dialogue of the story is indicative of the Jamaican creole. Reviewer Francis M Shim has praised D'Costa for her use of language in her stories, and has stated that "the language is boldly Jamaican, with all the dialogue passages being in the dialect." This has the effect of positively affirming the Jamaican identity, and providing a story to which the Caribbean student can immediately relate. In Fifty Caribbean Writers: A Bio-bibliographical Critical Sourcebook, Daryl Cumber Dance writes, "In Escape to Last Man Peak one recognizes a successful attempt to normalize a situation in language long seen as problematic for the Jamaican child and to put it into perspective. D'Costa's style moves easily between the prose and the narrative passages—a relaxed and flexible rendering of educated local usage—and the dialogue ranging from broad vernacular to English, showing only slight Creole interference."
