= Cassidy/JLU orthography =

Phonetic system for writing Jamaican Patois

The Cassidy/JLU orthography (Jamaican Patois: Kyasidi–JLU Sistim) is a phonemic system for writing Jamaican Patois originally developed by the linguist Frederic Cassidy. It is used as the writing system for the Jamaican Wikipedia, known in Patois, and written using the Cassidy/JLU system, as the Jumiekan Patwa Wikipidia.

== Background ==
Patois has long been written with various respellings compared to English so that, for example, the word "there" might be written ⟨de⟩, ⟨deh⟩, or ⟨dere⟩, and the word "three" as ⟨tree⟩, ⟨tri⟩, or ⟨trii⟩. Standard English spelling is often used and a nonstandard spelling sometimes becomes widespread even though it is neither phonetic nor standard (e.g. ⟨pickney⟩ for /pikni/, 'child').

== Creation ==
Cassidy advocated for creole languages to use an orthography, or writing style, that did not rely on European spelling conventions.

The more the creole differs phonemically from the lexicalizing language (English, French, Dutch - whatever), the more it must differ in its orthography. It should be taught and learned in a system of its own ... Paramount should be a phonemically accurate, consistent, autonomous system

— Cassidy (1993)

Cassidy's orthography, initially proposed in 1961, uses a phonemic system that closely reproduces the sound of the language. The Cassidy System was later adopted and modified by the Jamaican Language Unit (JLU) at the University of the West Indies.

== Development ==
In 2002, the Jamaican Language Unit was set up at the University of the West Indies at Mona to begin standardizing the language, with the aim of supporting non-English-speaking Jamaicans according to their constitutional guarantees of equal rights, as services of the state are normally provided in English, which a significant portion of the population cannot speak fluently. The vast majority of such persons are speakers of Jamaican Patois. It was argued that failure to provide services of the state in a language in such general use or discriminatory treatment by officers of the state based on the inability of a citizen to use English violates the rights of citizens. The proposal was made that freedom from discrimination on the ground of language be inserted into the Charter of Rights.

== Comparison with standard English ==
The JLU standardized the Jamaican alphabet as follows:

Short vowels
Letter	Patois	English
i	sik	sick
e	bel	bell
a	ban	band
o	kot	cut
u	kuk	cook

Long vowels
Letter	Patois	English
ii	tii	tea
aa	baal	ball
uu	shuut	shoot

Diphthongs
IPA	Letter	Patois	English
/ia/	ie	kiek	cake
/ua/	uo	gruo	grow
/ai/	ai	bait	bite
/au/	ou	kou	cow

Nasal vowels are written with -hn, as in kyaahn (can't) and iihn (isn't it?)

Consonants
IPA	Letter	Patois	English
/b/	b	biek	bake
/d/	d	daag	dog
/tʃ/	ch	choch	church
/f/	f	fuud	food
/g/	g	guot	goat
/h/	h	hen	hen
/dʒ/	j	joj	judge
/k/	k	kait	kite
/l/	l	liin	lean
/m/	m	man	man
/n/	n	nais	nice
/ŋ/	ng	sing	sing
/p/	p	piil	peel
/r/	r	ron	run
/s/	s	sik	sick
/ʃ/	sh	shout	shout
/t/	t	tuu	two
/v/	v	vuot	vote
/w/	w	wail	wild
/j/	y	yong	young
/z/	z	zuu	zoo
/ʒ/	zh	vorzhan	version

h is written according to local pronunciation, so that hen (hen) and en (end) are distinguished in writing for speakers of western Jamaican, but not for those of central Jamaican.

== Publications ==
In 2012 the Bible Society, in collaboration with the JLU, translated the New Testament into Jamaican using the Cassidy orthography, it was published as Di Jamiekan Nyuu Testiment.
