= Di Jamiekan Nyuu Testiment =

Bible translation

- Abbreviation: JNT
- Language: Jamaican Patois
- NT published: October 2012
- Authorship: Bible Society of the West Indies
- John 3:16 Kaa, yu si, Gad lov di worl so moch dat im gi op im wan dege-dege Bwai Pikni, so enibadi we chos iina im naa go ded bot a-go liv fi eva.

Di Jamiekan Nyuu Testiment is a translation of the New Testament into Jamaican Patois prepared by the Bible Society of the West Indies in 2012. In advance of the publication, a translation of the Gospel of Luke was published in 2010 as Jiizas: di Buk We Luuk Rait bout Im. The translation has been seen as a step towards gaining official recognition for the language, but has also been viewed as detrimental to efforts at promoting the use of English. Noel Leo Erskine, Professor of Theology and Ethics at Emory University, argued that the translation of the Bible into Patois is a breakthrough allowing Jamaicans to hear Christian scripture in their primary language and will promote the understanding that all cultures have access to divine truth.

It is written using the Cassidy/JLU orthography.

== Comparison with English Standard Version ==
A comparison of the Lord's Prayer—

As it occurs in Di Jamiekan Nyuu Testiment:

Wi Faada we iina evn,
mek piipl av nof rispek fi yu an yu niem.
Mek di taim kom wen yu ruul iina evri wie.
Mek we yu waahn apm pan ort apm,
jos laik ou a wa yu waahn fi apm iina evn apm
Tide gi wi di fuud we wi niid.
Paadn wi fi aal a di rang we wi du,
siem laik ou wi paadn dem we du wi rang.
An no mek wi fies notn we wi kaaz wi fi sin,
bot protek wi fram di wikid wan.

As it occurs in the English Standard Version:

Our Father in heaven,
hallowed be Your name.
Your kingdom come,
Your will be done,
on earth, as it is in heaven.
Give us this day our daily bread,
and forgive us our debts,
as we also have forgiven our debtors.
And lead us not into temptation,
but deliver us from evil.
