= Velma Pollard =

Jamaican poet and fiction writer (1937–2025

- c.1984 at West Indian Literature conference
- Born: 26 March 1937; Woodside, Saint Mary Parish, Colony of Jamaica, British Empire
- Died: 2 February 2025 (aged 87); Kingston, Jamaica
- Education: University College of the West Indies
- Occupations: Poet and fiction writer
- Children: 3
- Relatives: Erna Brodber (sister)
- Awards: Casa de las Americas (1992)

Velma Pollard (26 March 1937 – 1 February 2025) was a Jamaican poet and fiction writer. Among her most noteworthy works are Shame Trees Don't Grow Here (1991) and Leaving Traces (2007). She was known for the melodious and expressive mannerisms in her work. She was the sister of writer Erna Brodber.

== Background ==
Velma Pollard was born on 26 March 1937 to a farmer and school teacher in Woodside, Saint Mary Parish, Jamaica. Both Velma and her sister Erna expressed interest in the arts at a young age. Pollard attended Excelsior High School in Kingston, Jamaica. She went on to attend the University College of the West Indies, where she read Languages. She earned a Master's degree in English and Education from Columbia University and McGill University respectively. Pollard died in Kingston on 1 February 2025, at the age of 87.

== Career ==
Her interest in writing began at an early age; when she was seven years old, she won her first prize for a poem. It was not until 1975 that she became eager to have her work published. She submitted her work to various journals, including the Jamaica Journal. Since 1988, her writing was published in several mediums, and appeared in such anthologies as Jamaica Woman: An Anthology of Poems (edited by Pamela Mordecai and Mervyn Morris, 1980), Her True-True Name (edited by Pamela Mordecai and Betty Wilson), and Daughters of Africa (edited by Margaret Busby, 1992). Pollard published four poetry collections, in addition to writing fiction. Her book Karl won the Casa de las Americas literary prize in 1992. After her retirement, Pollard had a continued presence at the University of West Indies as a senior lecturer.

Pollard extensively researched Creole languages of the English-official Caribbean. From this area of research, she found inspiration for her poetry. In August 2022, Pollard was elected as an honorary member of the Society for Caribbean Linguistics (SCL), which she served with distinction as an SCL Executive Officer and SCL Financial Officer.

== Works ==
Pollard's upbringing in a rural community had a strong influence on her writing. Her work often features nostalgia of the countryside, and a strong philosophical tone. The way in which she recited her work reflected the firmness and richness of her writing. Her poetry often reflects on modernity in contrast with the slower lifestyles of the past. In 2013, Pollard released a collection of poetry titled And Caret Bay Again: New and Selected Poems. This collection showcases her witty style of writing as well as her ability to maintain her audiences' interest.

== Bibliography ==
=== Poetry ===
- Crown Point and Other Poems, Leeds: Peepal Tree Press, 1988, ISBN 9780948833243.
- Shame Trees Don't Grow Here, Leeds: Peepal Tree Press, 1991, ISBN 9780948833489.
- Leaving Traces, Peepal Tree Press, 2007, ISBN 9781845230210.
- And Caret Bay Again: New and Selected Poems, Peepal Tree Press, 2013, ISBN 9781845232092.

=== Fiction ===
- Considering Woman (short stories), London: The Women's Press, 1989, ISBN 9781845232092.
- Homestretch. Essex: Longman, 1994. ISBN 9780582227323.
- Karl and Other Stories, Longman Caribbean Writers, 1994, ISBN 978-0582227262

=== As editor ===
- (With Jean D'Costa) Over Our Way: A Collection of Caribbean Short Stories for Young Readers. Longman Caribbean. 1980. ISBN 0582765676..
