= Sprat Morrison =

1972 children's novel by Jean D'Costa

- 1990 edition
- Author: Jean D'Costa
- Language: English
- Genre: Children's novel
- Publication date: 1972
- Publication place: Jamaica
- OCLC: 24668741

Sprat Morrison (ISBN 0-582-05207-6) is a children's book published in 1972, and the first novel written by Jamaican author Jean D'Costa. The book is about the adventures of a young boy living in Papine, a suburb of Kingston. It is widely studied in Caribbean schools.

Sprat Morrison is part of the book series Horizons. Horizons is a series targeted towards 11 to 14-year-old Caribbean citizens.
