= Meet Joe Black =

1998 film by Martin Brest

- Theatrical release poster
- Directed by: Martin Brest
- Screenplay by: Bo Goldman; Kevin Wade; Ron Osborn; Jeff Reno
- Based on: Death Takes a Holiday by Maxwell Anderson; Gladys Lehman; Death Takes a Holiday by Walter Ferris; La morte in vacanza by Alberto Casella
- Produced by: Martin Brest
- Starring: Brad Pitt; Anthony Hopkins; Claire Forlani; Jake Weber; Marcia Gay Harden; Jeffrey Tambor
- Cinematography: Emmanuel Lubezki
- Edited by: Joe Hutshing; Michael Tronick
- Music by: Thomas Newman
- Production company: City Light Films
- Distributed by: Universal Pictures
- Release dates: November 8, 1998 (Tokyo International Film Festival); November 13, 1998 (United States)
- Running time: 180 minutes
- Country: United States
- Language: English
- Budget: $90 million
- Box office: $142.9 million

Meet Joe Black is a 1998 American romantic fantasy drama film directed and produced by Martin Brest, from a screenplay by Bo Goldman, Kevin Wade, Ron Osborn, and Jeff Reno. It stars Brad Pitt, Anthony Hopkins, and Claire Forlani, and is based on the 1934 film Death Takes a Holiday.

The story follows media mogul Bill Parrish, who is approached by Death shortly before his 65th birthday. Death assumes the body of a young man previously encountered by Parrish's daughter Susan and agrees to postpone Bill's death in exchange for being shown what it is like to live as a human, while developing a relationship with Susan.

Meet Joe Black premiered as the closing-night film of the Tokyo International Film Festival on November 8, 1998, and was released in the United States by Universal Pictures on November 13. It grossed $142.9 million worldwide against a budget of $90 million. Critical response was mixed: reviewers generally praised Hopkins's performance while criticizing the film's three-hour length, slow pacing, and screenplay.

== Plot ==
Media mogul Bill Parrish is nearing his 65th birthday, and hears a mysterious voice that he tries to ignore. His eldest daughter Allison is planning an elaborate party for him, and his younger daughter Susan, a resident in internal medicine, is in a relationship with his protégé Drew. Recognizing that Susan is not deeply in love, Bill suggests she wait for someone who will sweep her off her feet. Susan forms a connection with a man at a coffee shop, but departs without getting his name, before he is fatally struck by multiple cars.

At his office, Bill experiences chest pains as the voice says, "The answer to your question is yes." During dinner with his family, he is summoned out of the room by the voice. It says the question haunting Bill is, "Am I going to die?" The voice reveals itself, inhabiting the body of the man Susan met; Bill deduces he is Death. Curious about life, Death declares that for as long as Bill serves as his guide on Earth, he will postpone taking him.

Under pressure to introduce his new companion, Bill spontaneously names him "Joe Black". Surprised to see him again, Susan is intrigued by Joe's naïveté as he becomes fascinated by food, emotion, and the small things everyone else takes for granted. Drew, jealous of Susan and Joe's mutual attraction, conspires to sell the company after Bill rejects a major merger. Capitalizing on Bill's strange reliance on Joe, Drew manipulates Allison's husband Quince to convince the board of directors to vote Bill out as chairman and approve the merger.

Giving in to passion they have for each other, Susan and Joe make love. Bill later sees them kiss, and angrily confronts Joe and expresses his disapproval to Susan. Joe meets one of Susan's terminally ill patients, who senses that Joe is part of her impending death. They discuss his feelings for Susan and the meaning of life, and he comforts her as she dies peacefully. As Bill's birthday arrives, Allison acknowledges that Susan has always been his favorite, but assures him that he has been a loving father.

At the party, Joe reveals his intention to take Susan with him that night. Bill pleads with him to recognize the meaning of true love and not steal Susan's life. Joe changes his mind as Susan tells him that she has loved him since meeting in the coffee shop, and then – like her father before her – realizes who he truly is. They share a tearful goodbye as he tells her he loves her and thanks her for loving him. Bill forgives Quince, who apologizes for unwittingly undermining him, and summons Drew. Claiming to be an agent of the Internal Revenue Service, Joe exposes Drew's underhanded dealings to the board and restores control of the company to Bill. Knowing his death is imminent, Bill delivers a grateful speech to his guests for a fulfilling life and says goodbye to his family. Urging Susan to live with no regrets, he shares a final dance with her as the fireworks begin.

Finding Joe waiting with tears in his eyes, Bill thanks him for showing Susan how she should be loved, and Joe assures Bill that he has nothing to fear. Susan watches as they cross a nearby bridge, and only the man from the coffee shop reappears. Unsure where he has been, he rekindles his connection with Susan, who realizes that "Joe" is gone. Recalling their first meeting and both wishing that he could have met her father, Susan and the man return to the party hand-in-hand.

== Cast ==
- Brad Pitt as Joe Black / Young Man in Coffee Shop
- Anthony Hopkins as William Parrish
- Claire Forlani as Susan Parrish
- Jake Weber as Drew
- Marcia Gay Harden as Allison
- Jeffrey Tambor as Quince

In addition, Lois Kelly Miller portrays Susan's Jamaican patient who instinctively perceives who Joe really is.

== Production ==
=== Filming ===
Most of William Parrish's country mansion scenes were shot at the Aldrich Mansion in Warwick, Rhode Island. The penthouse interiors and Parrish Communications offices were sets built at the 14th Regiment Armory in the South Slope neighborhood in Brooklyn, New York.

The coffee shop where Susan meets the young man is Broadway Restaurant, at 2664 Broadway and West 101st Street in New York's Manhattan. Principal photography commenced on 11 June 1997 and concluded on 12 November 1997.

=== Versions ===
A two-hour version was made to show on television and airline flights, by cutting most of the plotline involving Bill Parrish's business. Since director Martin Brest derided this edit of his film and disowned it, the director's credit on this version used the Hollywood pseudonym Alan Smithee.

== Release ==
The film premiered as the closing night film of the Tokyo International Film Festival on 8 November 1998.

== Reception ==
=== Box office ===
Meet Joe Black opened in the United States and Canada on the weekend of 13–15 November 1998, and had a weekend gross of $15,017,995 ranking #3, behind The Waterboy's second weekend and the opening of I Still Know What You Did Last Summer. While the film had a disappointing box office gross in the United States and Canada of $44,619,100, it fared much better internationally. Taking in an additional $98,321,000, the movie grossed a worldwide total of $142,940,100.

As Meet Joe Black was one of the few films showing the first trailer for Star Wars: Episode I – The Phantom Menace, it was reported that Star Wars fans bought tickets just to see the trailer and then left right after it finished playing.

=== Critical response ===
Meet Joe Black received mixed reviews from critics, with most complimenting the performances but criticizing the film's three-hour length, the slow pacing, and the screenplay. Roger Ebert gave it three stars, but disliked the peripheral storylines and overly drawn-out ending. He concluded that despite its flaws, "there's so much that's fine in this movie". Peter Travers of Rolling Stone wrote that most of the characters were one-dimensional. Hopkins received uniform praise for his performance, with Travers opining that Hopkins' Bill Parrish was the only fully realized character in the film; Mick LaSalle wrote that "Hopkins' acting is so emotionally full that the tiniest moments...ring with complexities of thought and feeling." Pitt, on the other hand, received a mixed response, with LaSalle calling his performance so bad "it hurts" and James Berardinelli calling it "execrable". Thomas Newman's score received critical acclaim; it is generally considered one of his best works. Meet Joe Black earned a Razzie Award nomination for Worst Remake or Sequel, being a takeoff of the film Death Takes a Holiday.

On Rotten Tomatoes, the film holds a 48% approval rating on 52 reviews, with an average score of 5.60/10. The website's critical consensus reads, "Meet Joe Black is pretty to look at and benefits from an agreeable cast, but that isn't enough to offset this dawdling drama's punishing three-hour runtime." On Metacritic, the film received a 43% score on 24 reviews, indicating "mixed or average reviews". Audiences surveyed by CinemaScore graded the film "A−" on a scale of A to F.

In retrospect, Brad Pitt views his performance in Meet Joe Black as a low point in his career, feeling he lacked direction at the time. He admitted to underperforming, saying, "I dogged it. I muffed it." He believes someone else could have done a better job and regrets taking the role, stating it was "the pinnacle of my…loss of direction and compass." While he praises Anthony Hopkins for his performance, he recognizes that he did not fully connect with the material.
