= Psychic damage =

Negative effects of stereotypes on individual members of stigmatized groups

Psychic damage is a concept used in the field of social psychology to describe the negative effects of stereotypes on individual members of stigmatized groups. This definition of "psychic damage" was used by U.S. historian Daryl Scott to describe the effects of stereotyping on African-Americans in his 1997 book Contempt and Pity: Social Policy and the Image of the Damaged Black Psyche, 1880–1996, which won the Organization of American Historians' James A. Rawley Prize for the year's best work in race relations.

In his book Whistling Vivaldi: How Stereotypes Affect Us and What We Can Do, U.S. social psychologist Claude Steele wrote that the psyches of individual African-Americans gets damaged "by bad images of the group projected in society -- images of blacks as aggressive, as less intelligent, and so on." Repeated exposure to these images, he wrote, is internalized by members of the stigmatized group, which damages their character by causing low self-esteem, low expectations, low motivation and self-doubt, and contributes to societal problems such as high unemployment, poor marriage success, low educational achievement and criminality.

Initially the concept of psychic damage was used to describe the effects of stigmatization on African-Americans, but it has also been applied to other stigmatized groups, such as Native Americans, Latino people and women.
