= Simian (disambiguation) =

Simian refers to the higher primates: monkeys, apes, and humans.

Simian may also refer to:

== Places ==
- Șimian (island), an island on the Danube, in Romania
- Șimian, Bihor, a commune in Bihor County, Romania
- Șimian, Mehedinți, a commune in Mehedinţi County, Romania
- Simian Mountain, in Jiangjin, Chongqing

== People ==
- Ng Ser Miang, also known as Huáng Sīmián

== Anatomy ==
- Simian shelf, a bony thickening on the front of the ape mandible
- Single transverse palmar crease, also known as a simian crease orsimian line

== Arts, entertainment, and media ==
=== Literature ===
- Simians (Chinese poetry), monkeys, gibbons, and other primates in Chinese poetry

=== Music ===
- Simian (band), an English electronic group
- Simian Mobile Disco, an English electronic music duo and production team
- Simian Records, a record company founded by Elijah Wood

=== Other uses in arts, entertainment, and media ===
- "The Night of the Simian Terror" (1968), an episode of the television series Wild, Wild West
- The Simian Line (2001), an American improvisational film

== Software ==
- Simian (software), open-source Mac OS X software deployment utility
- Simian broadcast automation software, by Broadcast Software International

== Other uses ==
- Ethiopian wolf, also called a simian jackal

== See also ==
- Simeon (disambiguation)
- Simien (disambiguation)
- Simion, a Romanian name
