= Noblesse (disambiguation) =

Noblesse is a term used in Scottish nobility.

Noblesse may also refer to:

- Noblesse (cigarette), a brand of cigarette
- Noblesse (horse), a racehorse
- Noblesse (manhwa), a South Korean webtoon
- Noblesse (distillery), a defunct distillery
- The Noblesse, a South Korean television show
- Noblesse Palace, a palace in Romania

== See also ==
- Noblesse Oblige (disambiguation)
