= Ada Kaleh =

Former island on the Danube

Coordinates: 44°42′58″N 22°27′20″E

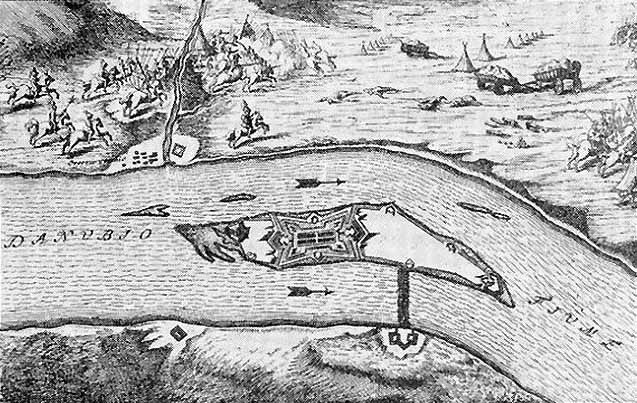
Early modern period map of the island

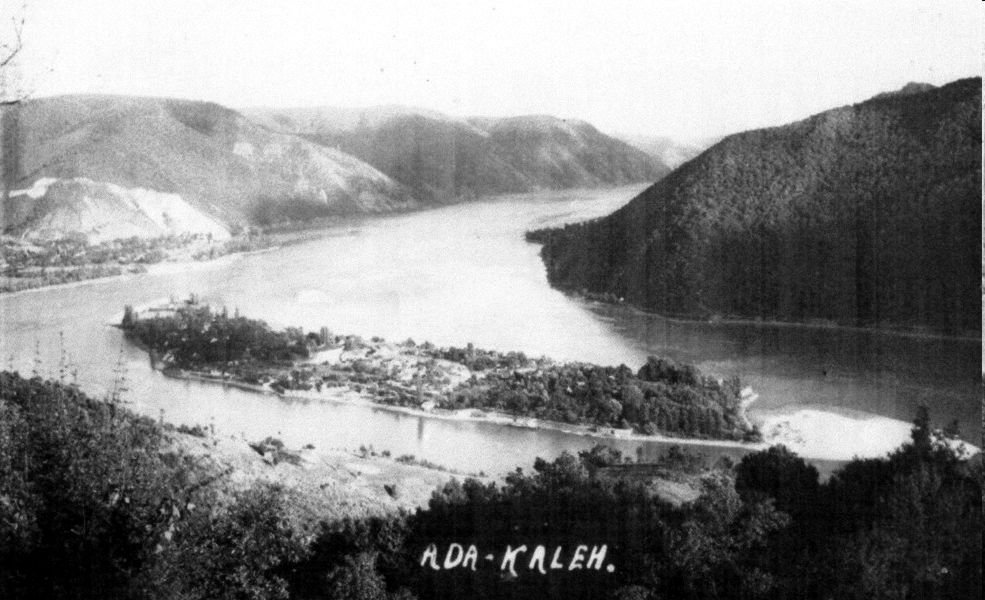
General view from north, photo from the end of the 19th century

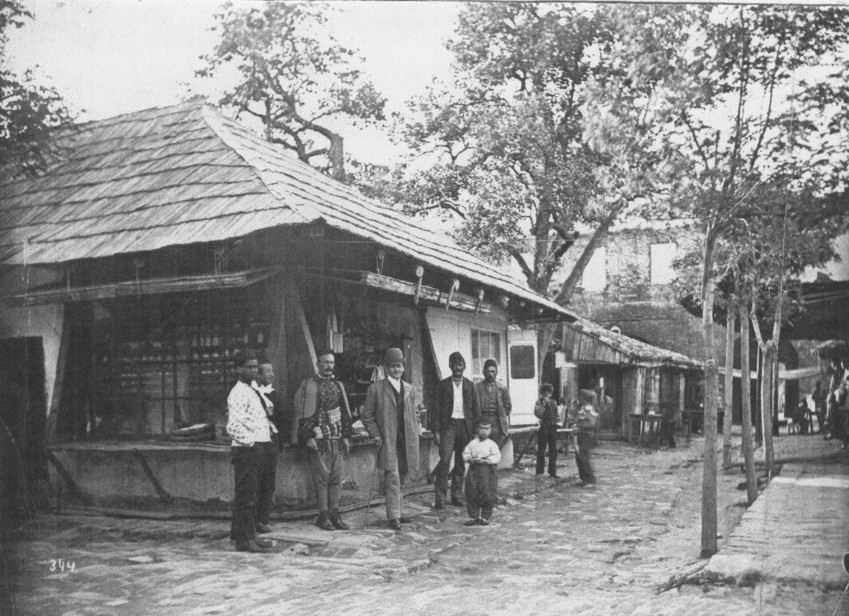
The bazaar

Ada Kaleh (Romanian pronunciation: [ˈada kaˈle]; from Turkish: Adakale, meaning "Island Fortress"; Hungarian: Újorsova or Ada Kaleh; Serbian and Bulgarian: Ада Кале, romanised: Ada Kale) was a small island on the Danube, located in Romania, that was submerged during the construction of the Iron Gates hydroelectric plant in 1970. The island was about 3 kilometres (1.9 mi) downstream from Orșova and was less than two kilometers long and approximately half a kilometer wide (1.75 x 0.4–0.5 km). Ada Kaleh was inhabited by Turkish Muslims from all parts of the Ottoman Empire, and there were also family ties to the Turkish Muslim populations of Vidin and Ruse, Bulgaria due to exogamic marriages.

The isle of Ada Kaleh is probably the most evocative victim of the Iron Gate dam's construction. Once an Ottoman Turkish exclave that changed hands multiple times in the 18th and 19th centuries, it had a mosque and numerous twisting alleys, and was known as a free port and a smuggler's nest. The islanders produced Turkish delight, baklava, rose water, rose marmalade, rose oil and fig. They were well known for Turkish oil wrestling. The existence of Ada Kaleh was overlooked at the 1878 Congress of Berlin peace talks surrounding the Russo-Turkish War, known in Romania as the War of Independence, which allowed the island to remain a de jure possession of the Ottoman Sultan until 1923.

== Turkish population ==
=== History ===
Adakale Turks (Turkish: Adakale Türkleri). The settlement of Turks began in 1699 when the Ottoman Empire took the island. In an Ottoman archive document, a brief history of the island and its inhabitants is described as follows: “After the 1770s, no boats crossed the Danube, presumably, and the Sipahi officers, who were under the command of an Ottoman pasha in Adakale, brought their families to Adakale. The people here are all descendants of these military families… This is why the native language of the people is Turkish.”

In 1830, when the Serbian Principality was established in the territory of the Sanjak of Smederevo of the Ottoman Empire, the crowded Turks in Serbia community living in the Principality of Serbia was settled in 6 settlements that would be considered Ottoman lands. Adakale became one of these six Turkish quarters, each of which was considered a township.

The islanders had family ties to the Turks of Vidin and Ruse, Bulgaria, due to exogamic marriages. A population census from 1913 shows that the majority of the inhabitants were Balkan Turks and Muslim Roma from Rumeli Eyalet, who came to the island after the Russo-Turkish War. The unifying bond was the Turkish language, Turkish culture, and Islam. The population practiced Sufism. The men wore the fez and women the çarşaf until they were forbidden to do so under the Socialist Republic of Romania. The islanders produced lokum, rose water, and rose oil. They also made a living from tourism, the tobacco industry, and fishery. The island was well known for its Turkish oil wrestling and football team.

During the Second Balkan War in 1913, the island was occupied by the Austro-Hungarian Army, and after World War I in 1919 it was occupied by the Kingdom of Romania. Some Turkish families left the island and went to Istanbul as Muhacir. These occupations were not accepted by the Ottoman Empire in the Treaty of Trianon.

After the Treaty of Lausanne in 1923, the island officially became a part of the Kingdom of Romania. From 1923 to 1938, due to Anti-Turkish sentiment, a lot of Turkish Families from Ada Kaleh and Dobruja went to Turkey. In 1945, some Turks from Ada Kaleh went to Turkey, because they didn't want to live in the Socialist Republic of Romania. In 1951, some Turkish families from Ada Kaleh were forced to settle in the Bărăgan Plain. In 1967, the entire remaining Turkish island population emigrated before the island was flooded. The majority went to Turkey, others settled in Dobruja in Romania. In the period of communism in the 1950s and 1960s, some Romanian, German, and Hungarian women from Orșova married Turkish men from Ada Kaleh.

=== Folk music ===
Alscher, who was on the island in the early 1900, gave information about the folk songs of islanders:

Girls sing folk songs. They are trying to sing in higher tones by vibrating their crystallized voices […]. The fishermen are singing recitative tunes and finishing them with a sharp ending […]. Afterwards, evening comes and Adakale rises through the phosphorescence of the water

Turkish folk songs, fairy tales, and lullabies from Adakale were recorded by the Hungarian Turkologist Ignac Kunos; the island was his first stop for his research. He compiled a hundred and fifty Adakale folk songs, including Ötme bülbül ötme yaz bahar oldu (Don't sing nightingale, summer has turned into spring), a Turkish folk song from Budin, but he did not record their melodies. For this reason, attempts are being made nowadays to recreate Adakale folk songs musically. Def, darbuka, and tanbur were used and songs were sung either by a group or individually. According to Eugenia Popescu-Judetz traditional Bektashi music was also popular in Adakale. Kemal Altınkaya, who was deeply interested in Balkan Turkish music also collected 600 folk songs and dance tunes, including from the island. Romanian Ioan R. Nicola and his team were also interested in Adakale's folklore and published the research Folclorul Turc Din Insula Ada-Kaleh in 1971, where they gave melodies of epic songs, war songs, love songs, wedding songs etc.

=== Dialect ===
Adakale Turkish belongs to the Rumelian subgroup (also known as Balkan subgroup) of the Turkish language. Before 1970, Adakale used to be the northernmost part where Western Rumelian was spoken. Just like other Western Rumelian dialects spoken in North, o and u were used instead of ö and ü.

Examples
| Adakale Turkish | Istanbul Turkish (official) | English |
|---|---|---|
| boyle | böyle | like this, such as |
| araysın | arıyorsun | you are looking for |
| dort | dört | four |
| yuru | yürü | go |

== History ==
The Habsburg monarchy built a Vauban-type fort there to defend it from the Ottoman Empire, and that fort would remain a bone of contention for the two empires. In 1699, under the Treaty of Karlowitz, the island came under Ottoman control, however, it was recaptured by the Austrians in the 1716–18 war, and the fortress of New Orșova was built by Austrian colonel Nicolas Doxat. After a four-month siege in 1738 it became Ottoman again, followed by the Austrians re-conquering it in 1789, but they had to return the island with the Treaty of Sistova (1791), which ended the 1787–91 war between the Ottoman Empire and the Habsburg monarchy (and, by extension, the Ottoman–Habsburg wars). Ada Kaleh was introduced to the Sanjak of Vidin, who was taken to the Danube vilayet in 1864. Thereafter, the island lost its military importance.

In 1804, during the First Serbian Uprising, Serbian rebels, led by Milenko Stojković, caught and executed the Dahije (renegade Janissary junta in the Sanjak of Smederevo) that had fled Belgrade and taken refuge on the island, thereby ending Dahije tyranny.

Even though the Ottomans lost the areas surrounding the island after the Russo-Turkish War (1877–1878), the biggest problem seen in the social life of the island was the poverty of the 179 Muslim Roma refugees who came from the lost Danube vilayet after 1878, due to the wars, and who did not even have a roof and lived in the Catacombs under the Fortress arches. From a Romanian perspective as the Romanian War of Independence, the island was totally forgotten during the peace talks at the Congress of Berlin in 1878, which allowed it to remain a de jure Ottoman territory and the Ottoman sultan's private possession, although de facto, in 1913, Austria-Hungary unilaterally declared its sovereignty over the island, until the Treaty of Lausanne in 1923.

Between 1878 and 1918, the areas surrounding the island were controlled by Austria-Hungary to the north and Serbia to the south, but the island was under Ottoman sovereignty. The Ottoman Government continued to appoint and send a nahiye müdürü (administrative head of a unit smaller than a district and bigger than a village) and a kadı (judge) regularly. The island's inhabitants (officially citizens of the Ottoman Empire) enjoyed exemption from taxes and customs and were not subject to conscription. The islanders also had the right to vote during the Ottoman general elections of 1908.

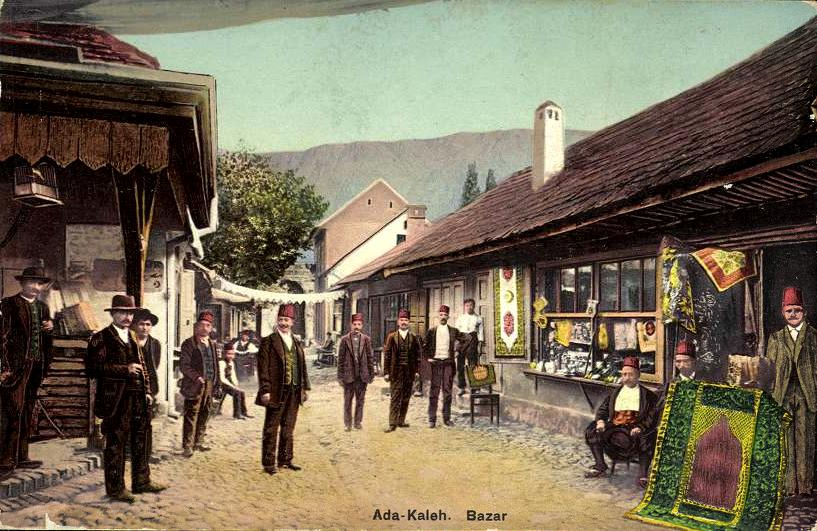
Ada Kaleh in 1912

On May 12, 1913, taking advantage of the Balkan Wars, dr. Zoltán Medve, the lord-lieutenant of Krassó-Szörény County, sailed to the island under Austro-Hungarian ensign and introduced Hungarian administration by the representation of the Dual Monarchy. The island was transformed into a municipality known as Újorsova and assigned into the Orsova district of Krassó-Szörény County. This was the last territorial expansion of Hungary before the outbreak of the First World War; the seizure was never officially recognised by the Ottoman government. In the first and only census conducted in 1913, it is recorded in the archive documents that 637 people lived in 171 households in Adakale. Of these, 458 were the resident population living in the island's houses. After the Austro-Hungarian occupation, some Turkish Families left the Island in 1913 and went to Istanbul as Muhacir.

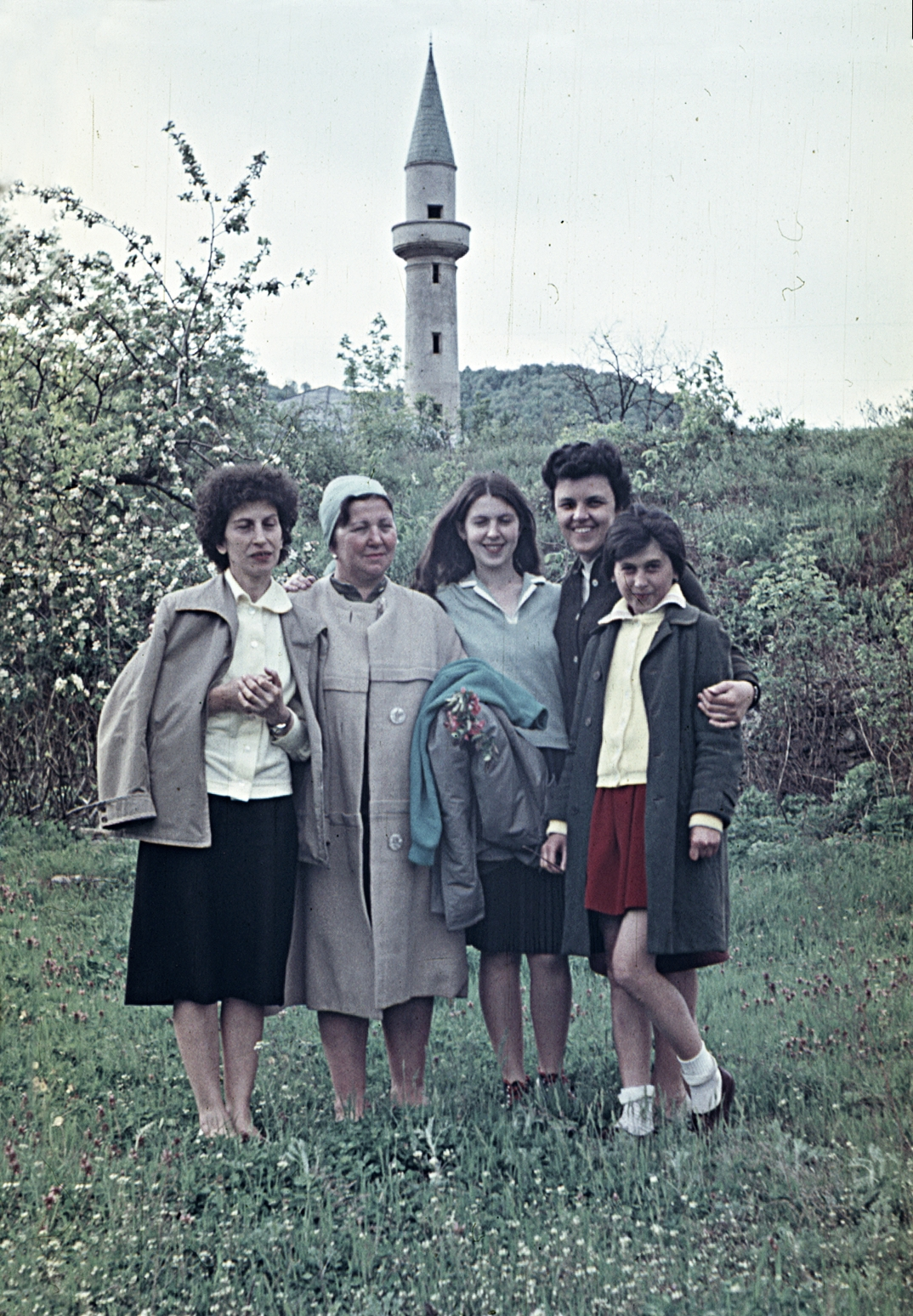
People posing before the mosque of Ada Kaleh, 1964

Following the end of World War I, Romania unilaterally declared its sovereignty in 1919 and strengthened its claim with the Treaty of Trianon in 1920. More Turkish families left for Istanbul. On July 24, 1923, the new Republic of Turkey officially ceded Ada Kaleh to Romania with Articles 25 and 26 of the Treaty of Lausanne; by formally recognising the related provisions in the Treaty of Trianon. The loss of the island is remembered with pain in Turkish historiography as İsmail Habib Sevük wrote in his "From Danube to the West":

We, who had lost half of the past geography, felt a much deeper melancholy for the loss of this small island, much stronger than the loss of the Arabic Lands. The Danube, which could not be kept by the Turks, was still connected to us with this small island. We feel the pain of an injured vessel in our grief.

From 1923 to 1938, Turkish Families from Ada Kaleh and Dobruja went to Turkey, and settled mostly in East Thrace.

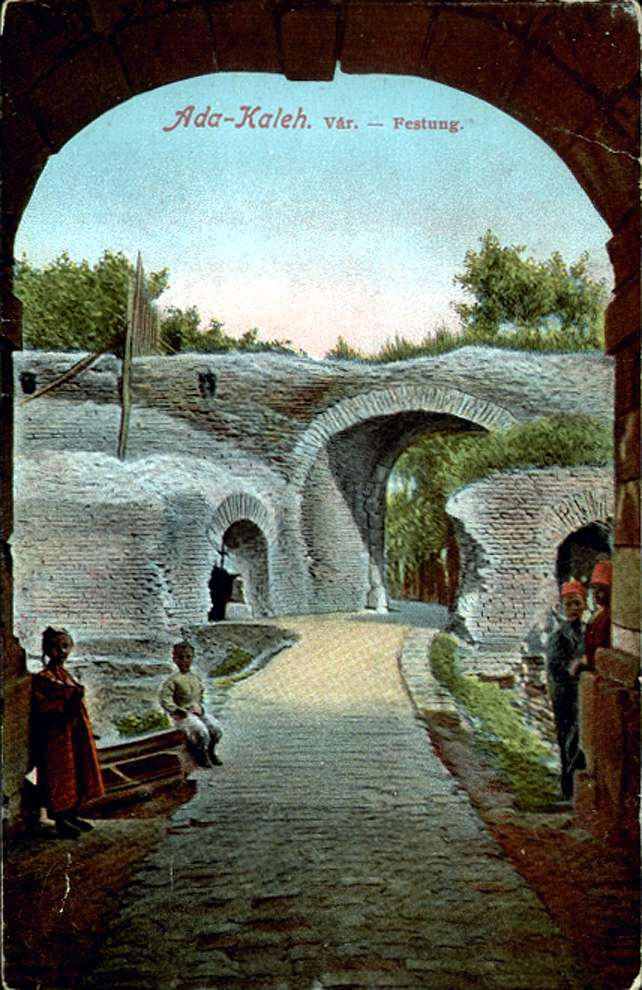
The fortress of Ada Kaleh, which gave its name to the island ("Island Fortress"). From a Hungarian postcard, 1912

The population lived primarily on the cultivation of tobacco and fishery, and later on tourism. In its last years of existence, the island's population ranged between 600 and 1,000 inhabitants. Before the island was covered by the waters of the Iron Gates Dam, part of the population moved in 1967 to Constanța in Romania and the rest to Turkey, invited by Prime Minister Demirel during his visit to the island.

The Ada Kaleh Mosque with Hammam, dating from 1903, was built on the site of an earlier Franciscan monastery from 1699. The carpet of the mosque, a gift from the Turkish Sultan Abdülhamid II, was relocated to the Grand Mosque of Constanța in 1965.

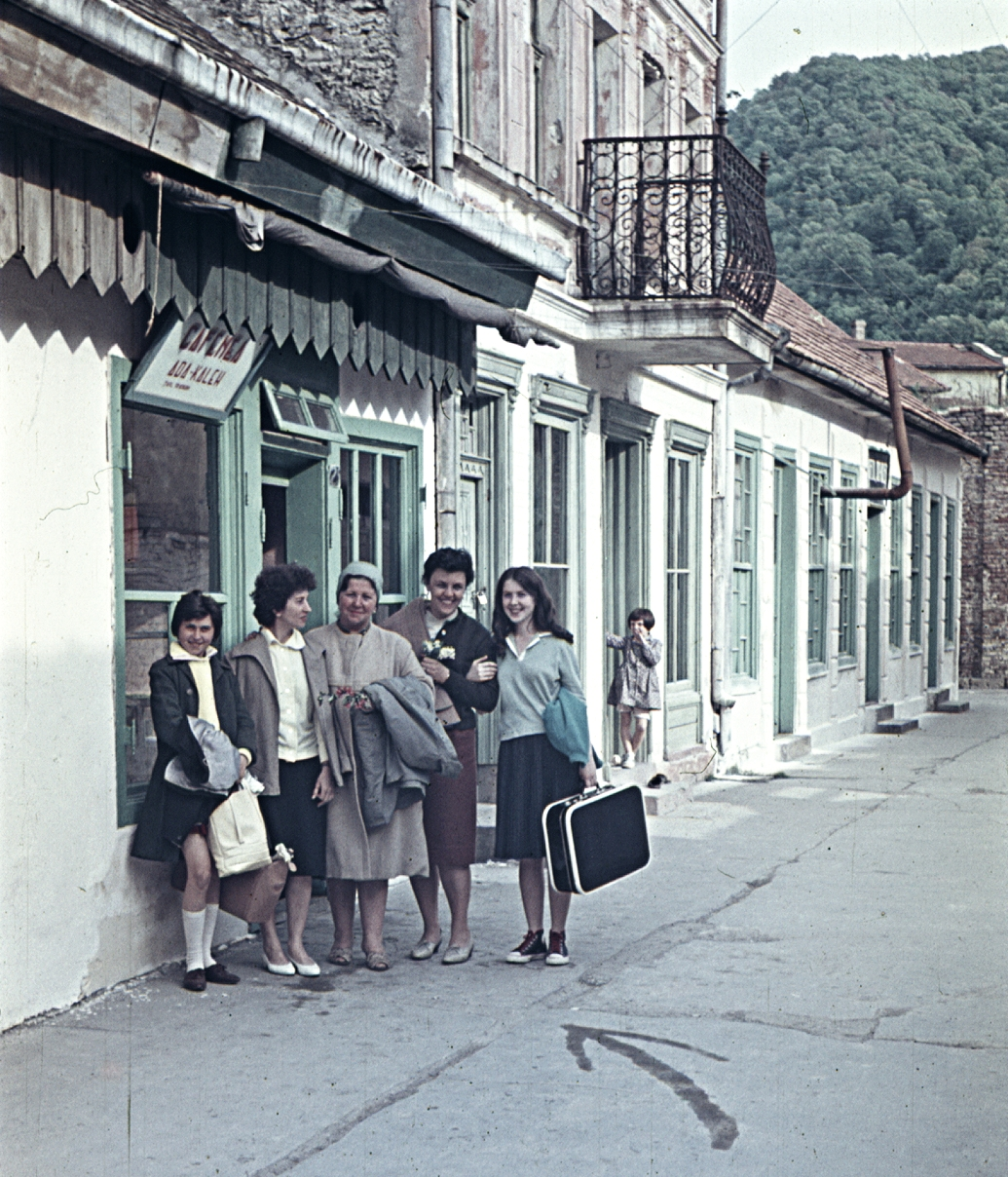
Residents of the island in 1964

The island was visited by King Carol II of Romania in 1931, and by Prime Minister Süleyman Demirel of Turkey on September 13, 1967.

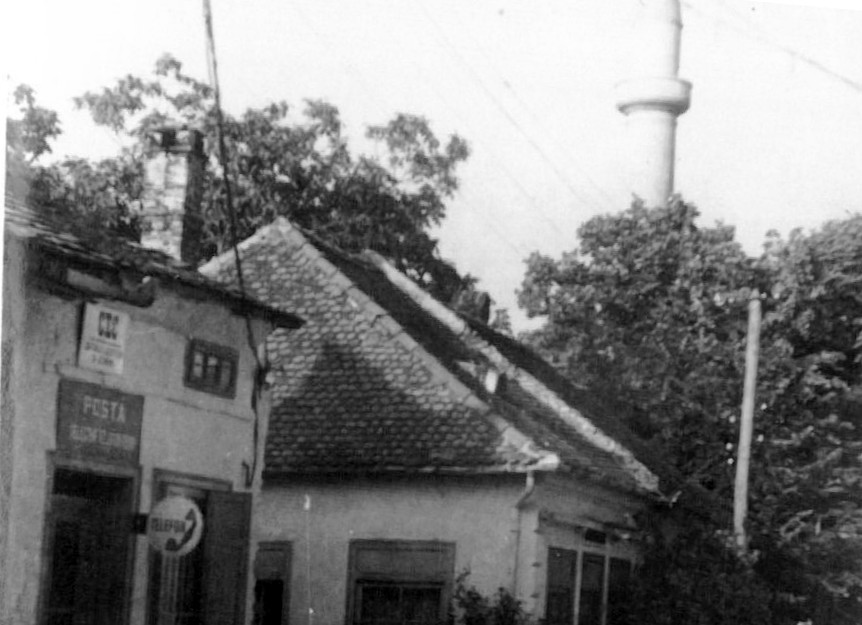
Post office (left) in 1968

The Muslim Turkish inhabitants of the island were described by visitors as kind, friendly, and openhearted.

== Aftermath ==
During the construction of the dam, some of the structures that were built on the island were relocated to the nearby Șimian Island, including part of the masonry of the fortress' catacombs, the mosque, the bazaar, Mahmut Pasha's house, the graveyard, and various other objects. However, the Ada Kaleh community decided to emigrate to Turkey after the evacuation of the island, instead of resettling on Șimian Island. A smaller part went to Dobruja, another Romanian territory with a Turkish minority, so the reconstruction of the "New Ada Kaleh" was never completed.

== In literature ==
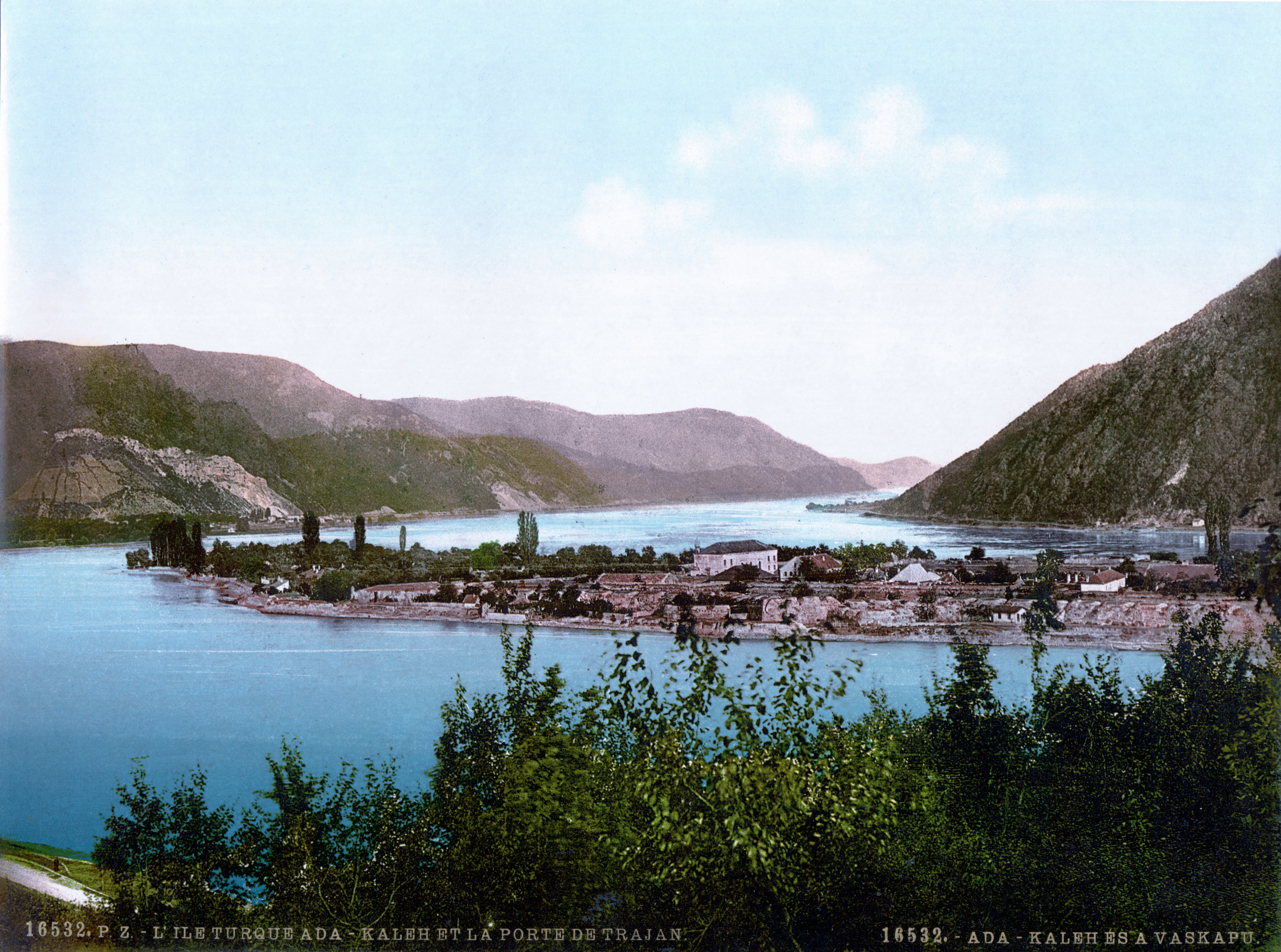
General view of the island, coloured photograph (between 1890 and 1905)

Ada Kaleh plays an important part in the novel of one of the most famous Hungarian authors, Mór Jókai. In the novel The Golden Man (Az Arany Ember), published in 1872, Ada Kaleh is called "No One's Isle" and it becomes an almost mythical symbol of peace, seclusion, and beauty, juxtaposed with the material outside world.

In Between the Woods and the Water, the second volume of Patrick Leigh Fermor's narrative of his journey across Europe, the author describes a delightful visit in 1934 with a group of elderly inhabitants and discusses the history of the island.

In De Laatste Eilanders, a historical fiction by Dutch-Rumanian author Stefan Popa, the last years of the island before it is flooded and the last inhabitants are relocated to Șimian Island, are described through the eyes of three teenagers.

== Notable people ==
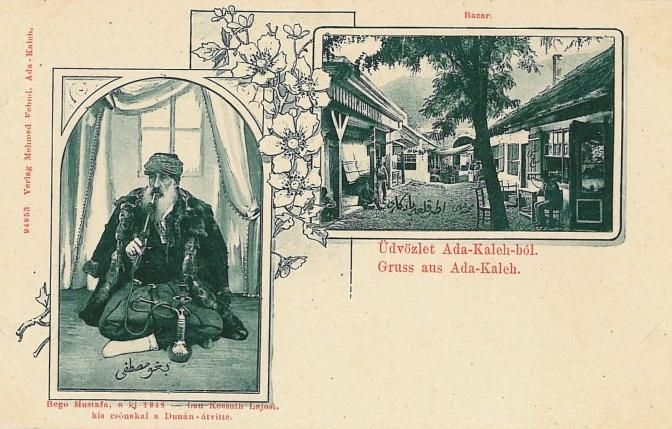
Bego Mustafa on an old postcard of Ada Kaleh. He helped the Hungarian national hero Lajos Kossuth cross the Danube and escape to Vidin (then part of the Ottoman Empire) in the aftermath of the Hungarian Revolution of 1848.

- Miskin Baba, was considered the patron Sufi saint by the Turks of Ada Kaleh. Legend says that he was an Uzbek prince from Bukhara, who came to the island around 1786 and died there around 1851. His Türbe was revered as a sanctuary
- Receb Ağa, the Island was ruled by him and his Family from 1788 - 1816
- Around 1860 the German Carl Heinrich Edmund von Berg visit Ada Kaleh and the House of Mahmut Pasha
- Bego Mustafa, former Corporal from Military of the Ottoman Empire, was a Turk who helped the Hungarian revolutionary Lajos Kossuth escape to Vidin at Ottoman Bulgaria in 1849, across the Danube river on a boat. Bego Mustafa's picture was often used for postcards from Ada Kaleh. He was the last Turkish Feudal Lord of Ada Kaleh
- Ali Kadri was the richest Turk on Ada Kaleh, he was an orphan and a former fisherman, later through his cigarette production he became very rich. He was a colorful personality, and was called Sultan of Ada Kaleh. He built a 24-room mansion with a Harem for his four wives, next the Mosque. Around 1945 he fled to Turkey together with his Family, to escape the communist regime in Romania, but his property was confiscated
