= Simien =

Simien or Semien may mean:

== People ==
- Wayne Simien, an American professional basketball player
- Terrance Simien, a U.S. zydeco musician, accordionist and songwriter
- Tracy Simien, a former NFL football player

== Places ==
- Kingdom of Simien, a Jewish kingdom said to have been located in the north-western part of Ethiopia
- Simien Mountains, Ethiopia
  - Semien Mountains National Park

== See also ==
- Simian, "pertaining to apes"
- Simian (disambiguation)
- Simion, a Romanian name
