= Alexandru Săvulescu =

Alexandru Săvulescu may refer to:

- Alexandru Săvulescu (architect) (1847–1902), Romanian architect
- Alexandru Săvulescu (footballer) (1898–1961), Romanian football manager
