= Amzei Church =

Heritage site in Bucharest, Romania

Coordinates: 44°26′40″N 26°05′38″E

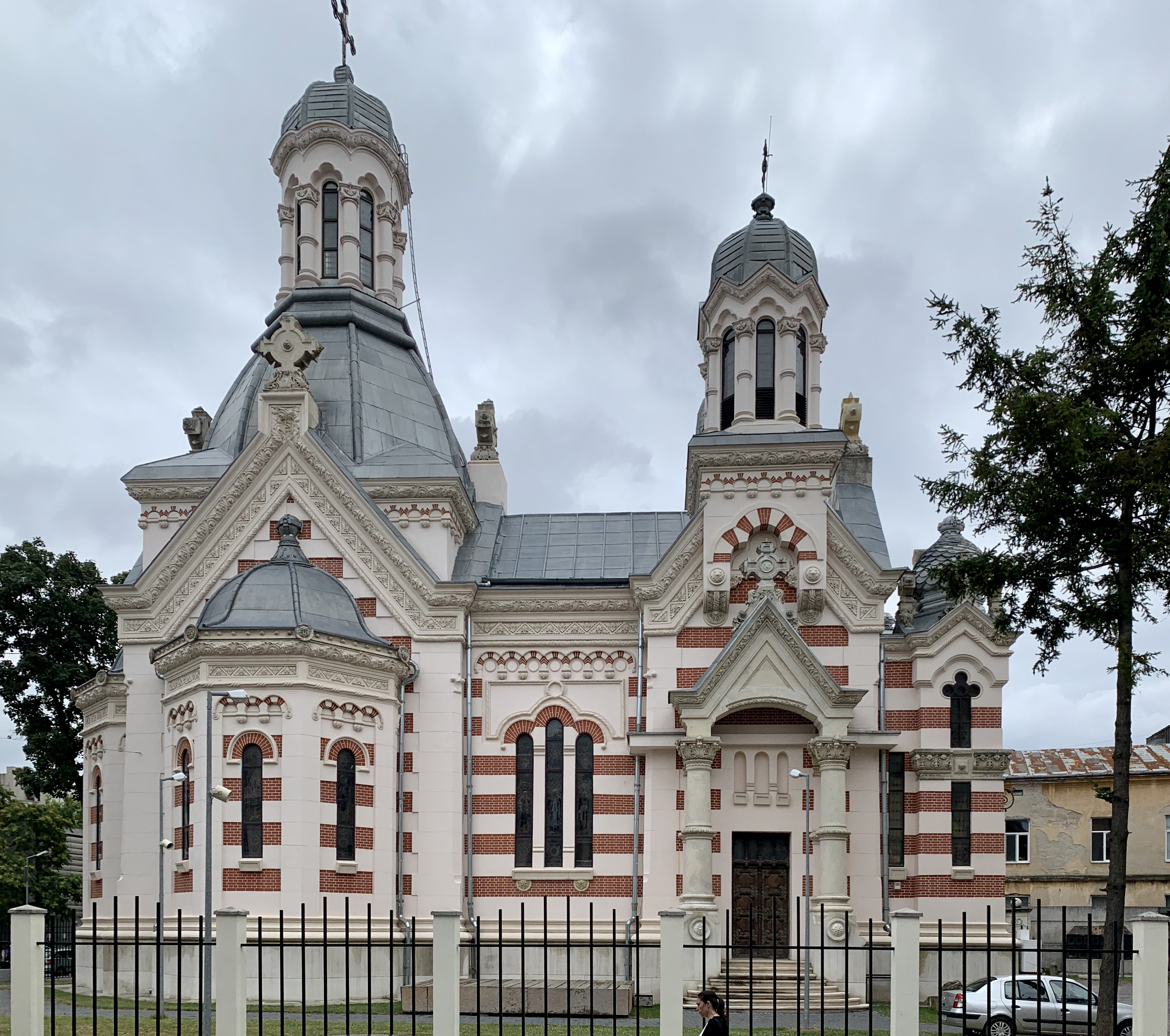
Amzei Church

Amzei Church (Romanian: Biserica Amzei) is a Romanian Orthodox church located at 12 Biserica Amzei Street in Bucharest, Romania. It is dedicated to the Feast of the Annunciation.

The original church on the site, a small single-domed structure dedicated to Saint Nicholas, was built between 1807 and 1810. The chief ktetor was the deputy Vistier (treasurer) of Wallachia, Amza Năescu; following his death, the church was nicknamed after him. A list of people to be prayed for (pomelnic) survives, carved in elegant Romanian Cyrillic; it was originally in the altar table and is now in the yard. Prior to 1832, the church was surrounded by cells where a school with two grades for beginners functioned. An 1846 fire destroyed the church; an ample restoration followed. During repairs in 1875, two domes of wood and tin were added. Also that year, a neoclassical stone fountain, partly sculpted, was built on the grounds, near the parish house. The old church was entirely demolished in 1898, on the initiative of the priest. Construction of the present structure, designed by Alexandru Săvulescu, began in July 1898 and was completed in October 1901, as the pisanie records.

The imposing cross-shaped church measures 28.7 meters long by 11 to 15.5 meters wide. It is eclectic in style, mainly Beaux-Arts. The exterior ornamentation, of stone and brick, features Romanian Revival touches: rows of brick alternating with masonry, niches beneath the cornice and richly carved string courses. The narthex is somewhat enlarged and there are three spires: a large one above the nave, ending in a spherical cupola and roof lantern; and two smaller ones above the sides of the narthex. The structure sits on a massive stone base some two meters high. There are three entry portals with doors of carved oak; the main one, on the west side, is beneath a trefoil arch. The north and south entrances have fairly deep porticoes with frontal arches. Each of the latter rests on columns with composite capitals, in academic style, and is topped by a sharp pediment. The interior is very high, with natural light entering through stained glass, in addition to three large bronze candelabra. The interior arches and columns are Renaissance Revival.

The church is listed as a historic monument by Romania's Ministry of Culture and Religious Affairs.
