= Carl Heinrich Edmund von Berg =

German forester (1800–1874)

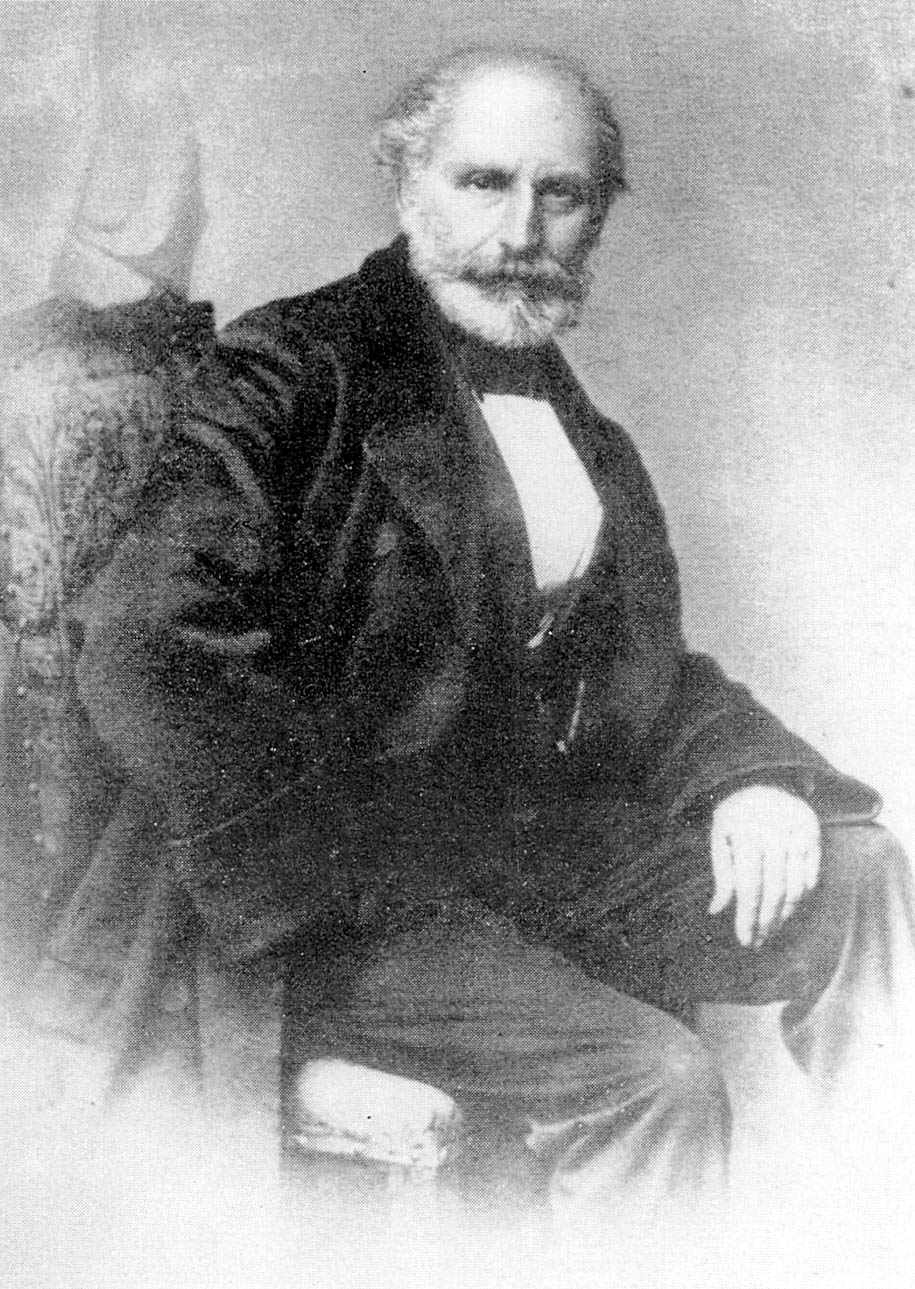
Carl Heinrich Edmund von Berg (1800–1874)

Carl Heinrich Edmund von Berg (30 November 1800 in Göttingen – 20 June 1874 in Schandau) was a German forestry scientist.

He was a student at the forestry academy in Dreißigacker, followed by studies at the University of Göttingen. In 1821 he became a teaching assistant at the Forstschule in Clausthal, where he subsequently served as a Forstschreiber (from 1824) and Oberförster and lecturer (from 1830). In 1833 he was named chief forester and forestry inspector in Lauterberg.

From 1845 to 1866, he was director of the Royal Saxon Academy of Forestry in Tharandt. Beginning in 1846, he headed the editorial staff of the Forstwissenschaftlichen Jahrbuchs der Akademie Tharandt.

== Published works ==
- Anleitung zum Verkohlen des Holzes ein Handbuch, 1830.
- Das Verdrängen der Laubwälder im nördlichen Deutschland durch die Fichte und die Kiefer in forstlicher und nationalökonomischer Hinsicht beleuchtet, 1844 – Displacement of deciduous forests in Northern Germany by spruce and pine, etc.
- Staatsforstwirtschaftslehre, 1850 – State forestry business administration.
- Aus dem Osten der österreichischen Monarchie, 1860 – From the east of the Austrian Monarchy.
- Betrachtungen über den einfluss der kleineren deutschen staaten auf die entwicklung und den fortschritt des forstwesens, 1867 – Observations on the influence of the smaller German states in the development and progress of forestry.
- Pürschgang im dickicht der jagd- und forstgeschichte, 1869.
- Geschichte der deutschen Wälder bis zum Schlusse des Mittelalters. Ein Beitrag zur Culturgeschichte, 1871 – History of German forests up until the end of the Middle Ages.
