= Noblesse Palace =

- Romanian
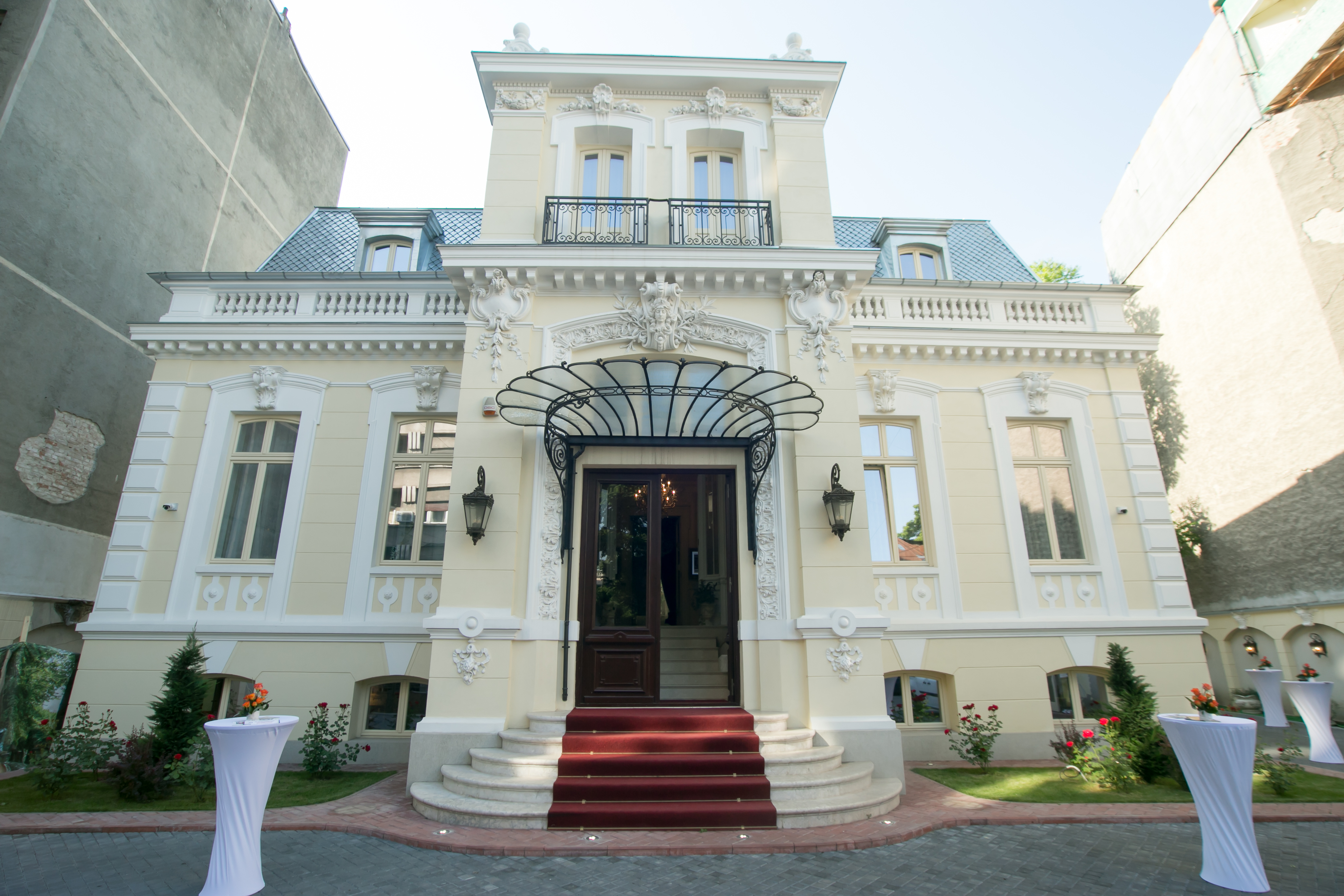
- Interactive map of the Noblesse Palace area

General information
- Architectural style: Eclectic
- Location: Bucharest, Romania, Romania
- Coordinates: 44.43539°N 26.10850°E
- Construction started: 1881
- Inaugurated: 2012
- Owner: Noblesse Group

Design and construction
- Architect: Alexandru Săvulescu

Website
- www.palatulnoblesse.ro

Noblesse Palace is a historical monument in Bucharest, Romania. The architecture of the building is in eclectic style built by architect Alexandru Săvulescu. It has 30 rooms on an area of 1,100 square metres (12,000 square feet). In the first phase, it was used as a bank and home by the Berkowits. It became an important cultural centre, including the Noblesse Interiors showroom and the Noblesse Art Gallery.

== Location ==
Noblesse Palace is located at 7 Sfinților Street, in Sector 3 of Bucharest, Romania. In the immediate vicinity is the Church with the Saints, dating from the 17th century. It is architecturally unique, having on the walls exterior paintings with "sibilities" (ancient characters), later named saints. The church gives its name to the street. It intersects with Calea Moșilor, an important commercial area.

== History ==
The first eclectic building in Bucharest, Palatul Noblesse is a historical monument built in 1881 by architect Alexandru Săvulescu (who also built the Romanian National Museum of History). The house was made for banker Ioan Pascu. It was the first building that Săvulescu designed after he returned from Paris, where he studied architecture.

In 1903, banker Leonid Berkowitz bought the house and changed architectural details designed by L. Schmid. The banker was the founder of the Berkowitz banks. He lived there after retiring from business. After his death, his son Max Berkowitz took over the house and transformed it into the bank's protocol centre. In 1936 it became the last official headquarters of the Berkowitz Banks. The Berkowitz family later left Romania.

Between 1945 and 1989 the house was dedicated to activities for children. It was abandoned from 1989–2012. In 2012 the house was bought by Noblesse Group and, after a long restoration, the house became one of the most important centres for design, art and culture.

== Restoration ==
The original plans of 1881 and 1903 existed in the Bucharest Archives. During the restoration, those plans guided the process. Interior fittings were adjusted to meet the needs of an event centre. Stucco was restored; walls were stripped and reinforced; marble added to rooms on the ground floor and Baroque painting was added to the ceiling. Two tile stoves dating to 1881 were kept. All items requiring restoration were made by teams of artisans who worked with traditional methods.
