= Șimian, Mehedinți =

Șimian
- Commune
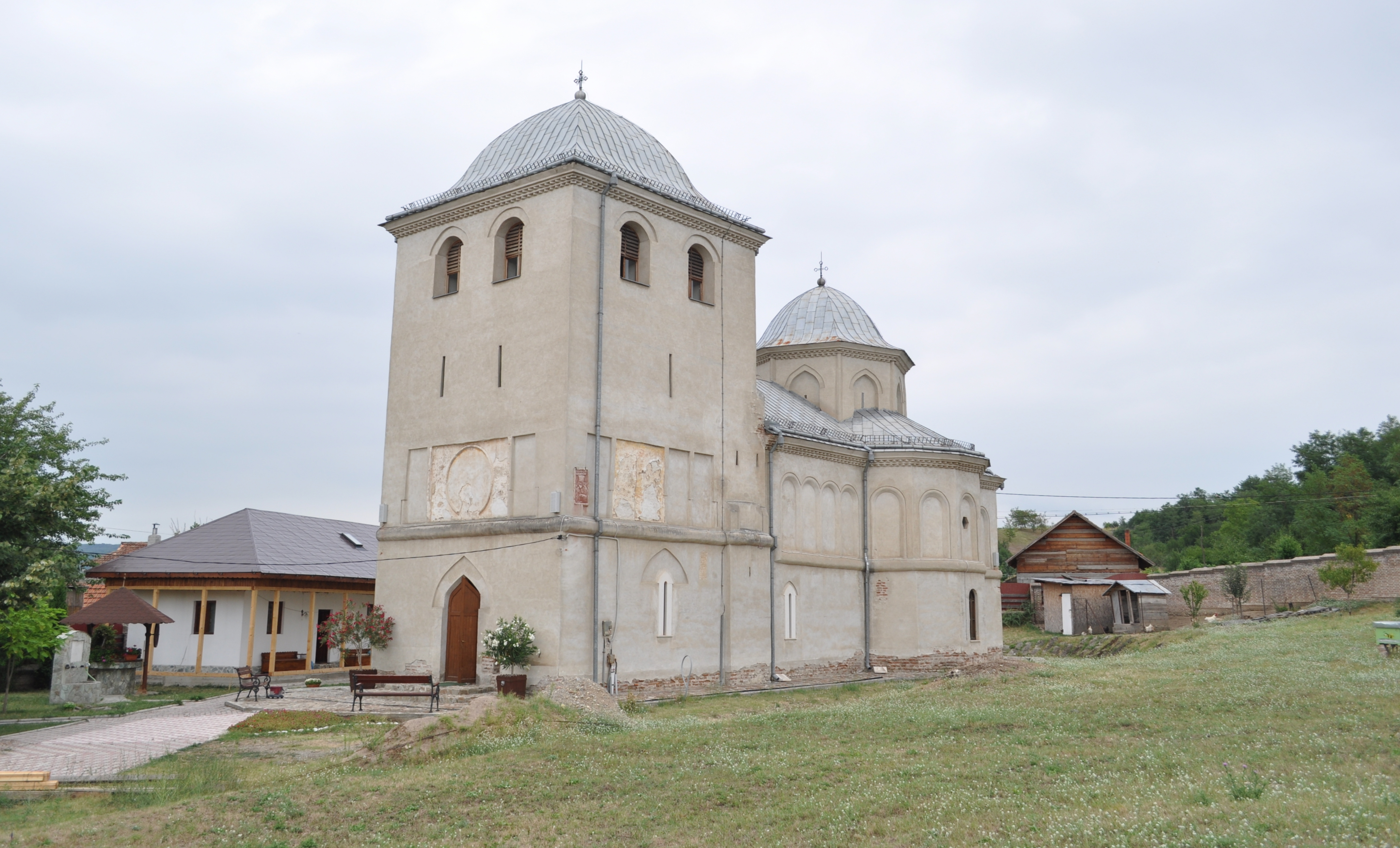
- Cerneți Monastery

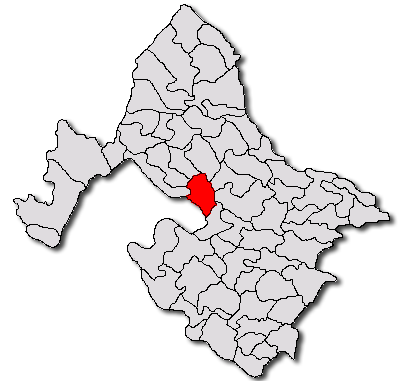
- Location in Mehedinți County

- Location in Romania
- Coordinates: 44.614°N 22.707°E
- Country: Romania
- County: Mehedinți

Government
  - Mayor (2020–2024): Constantin Trușcă (PNL)
- Area: 65.49 km^{2} (25.29 sq mi)
- Population (2021-12-01): 10,021
  - Density: 153.0/km^{2} (396.3/sq mi)
- Time zone: UTC+02:00 (EET)
  - Summer (DST): UTC+03:00 (EEST)
- Postal code: 227445
- Vehicle reg.: MH
- Website: www.primaria-simian.ro

Șimian is a commune located in Mehedinți County, Oltenia, Romania. It is composed of eight villages: Cerneți, Dedovița Nouă, Dedovița Veche, Dudașu, Erghevița, Poroina, Șimian, and Valea Copcii.

== Natives ==
- Dimitrie Grecescu (1841–1910), botanist and physician
- Constantin Oțet (1940–1999), football coach
- Alexandru Săvulescu (1847–1902), architect
- Sorin Vlaicu (b. 1965), football player

== See also ==
- Șimian (island)
- CS Minerul Mehedinți
