= Alexandru Săvulescu (architect) =

Romanian architect (1847 - 1902)

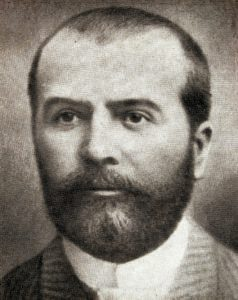
- Born: 1847; Cerneți, Mehedinți County, Wallachia
- Died: 1902 (aged 54–55); Bucharest, Kingdom of Romania
- Education: École des Beaux-Arts
- Occupation: Architect
- Years active: 1875–1902
- Notable work: Stătescu Villa

Alexandru Săvulescu (1847–1902) was a Romanian architect, one of his country's first prominent practitioners of modern architecture. He combined elements of traditional Byzantine architecture and Romanian architecture with French Art Nouveau in an eclectic style. He served as the chief architect for the Ministry of Public Education and Religious Affairs and the president of the Romanian Society of Architects. He helped found both the latter organization and the Romanian National School of Architecture. Some of his most renowned buildings are the Communal Palace of Buzău, the Noblesse Palace and the Post and Telegraph Palace, which now houses the National Museum of Romanian History.

== Biography ==
Săvulescu was born in 1847 in Cerneți, Mehedinți County, in what was then Wallachia. He studied in Bucharest and then went to Paris, where he graduated from the École des Beaux-Arts, in the studio of Léon Ginain. He returned to Romania in 1874 and became the architect for the Ministry of Education and Religious Affairs. In this capacity he designed several buildings for middle schools and high schools. He left the post in June 1899, succeeded by Ion D. Berindey.

His style was a unique blend of traditional Byzantine architecture and Romanian architecture mixed with French Art Nouveau, which is generically called eclectic. One of the first buildings he created, shortly after his return from training in Paris, was the Noblesse Palace, built in 1881, in the Jewish Quarter. Another 1881 building is located at 7 Sfinților Street, and is considered a historic monument by the Culture Ministry. Ioan Pascu requested a permit for Săvulescu to build on his lot No. 75, which was actually No. 7. The plans were signed by Săvulescu, who built it in an eclectic style with classical elements, featuring a central hallway with symmetrical rooms laid out on either side. The bedrooms, located off a T-shaped corridor, opened into a garden.

In Brăila, the Nicolae Bălcescu High School was built by Săvulescu between 1885 and 1886 in the neoclassical style. It is located at 182 Alexandru Ioan Cuza Boulevard. This was followed by a contract signing in March 1890 for construction of the Traian High School in Turnu Severin using Săvulescu's plans. Construction was completed in August 1890.

After Dimitrie Maimarolu won an international architecture competition for the Synodal Palace, a group of 24 prominent architects gathered in February 1891 and formed the Romanian Society of Architects (SAR). Maimarolu and Săvulescu, Grigore Cerchez, Ion Mincu, Alexandru Orăscu, and George Sterian, among others, founded the organization and elected Alexandru Orăscu as its first president. In October 1892, the group set up a private school of architecture. Between 1895 and 1902, Săvulescu served as president of the SAR and during his tenure, in 1897, the private school became the state-funded Romanian National School of Architecture, which today is the Ion Mincu University of Architecture and Urbanism in Bucharest.

Among Săvulescu's best known works is the Post, Casa II (1892 - 1897) and Telegraph Palace in Bucharest, built between 1894 and 1900. In 1892, the building was authorized, and Săvulescu was sent with the postal inspector, Ernest Sturza, to tour various postal facilities of Europe for the design. The final sketches were influenced primarily by the building in Geneva. Built in an eclectic style, it is rectangular with a large porch on a high basement and three upper floors. The stone façade features a portico supported by ten Doric columns and a platform consisting of twelve steps spanning the length of the building. There are many allegorical sculptural decorative details. Since 1972, the building has housed the National Museum of Romanian History, and it too been designated a historic monument.

Câmpulung features the bust of Muscel Regiment battalion commander Dimitrie Giurescu, a hero of the Romanian War of Independence of 1877, who died in action that November. Săvulescu and sculptor Dimitrie Demetrescu Mirea built the monument in 1897, upon the initiative of Colonel Scarlat Geanolu. It is located in the courtyard of a former infantry barracks. The bust is mounted on a solid, high pedestal to which are affixed two plates of black marble.

In 1892, he designed and built Casa II in Bucharest and in 1897, the Ștefan cel Mare School in Alexandria moved from its former location to 310 Libertății Street. A local entrepreneur, M. Frangulea, obtained the plot and hired Săvulescu to build the new boys' primary school for the city. The following year, work began on the Amzei Church of Bucharest, completed in 1901. Săvulescu designed the church, and his project team included his friend and fellow architect Ziegfried Kofszynski, engineer Dimitrie Dobrescu and the painter Umberto Marchetti, who supervised the interior decorations.

Săvulescu's last creation was the Communal Palace of Buzău, the landmark building of Buzău. Construction lasted from 1899 to 1903 on the Italian Renaissance style town hall, which features towers and loggia-style balconies. It represents some of his most elaborate work, blending styles in an art nouveau arrangement with motifs which appear on other local buildings. The vineyard and grape vines which decorate the column capitals are representative of the importance of grapes to the local economy. The columns are made of Cararra marble and the inscription, "Communal Palace", was carved by Ploiești sculptor Themistocle Vidali. Săvulescu would not live to see its inauguration in 1903 by King Carol I and Crown Prince Ferdinand, as he died in 1902. Kofszynski completed the project. The palace has been declared an architectural monument.

== Gallery ==
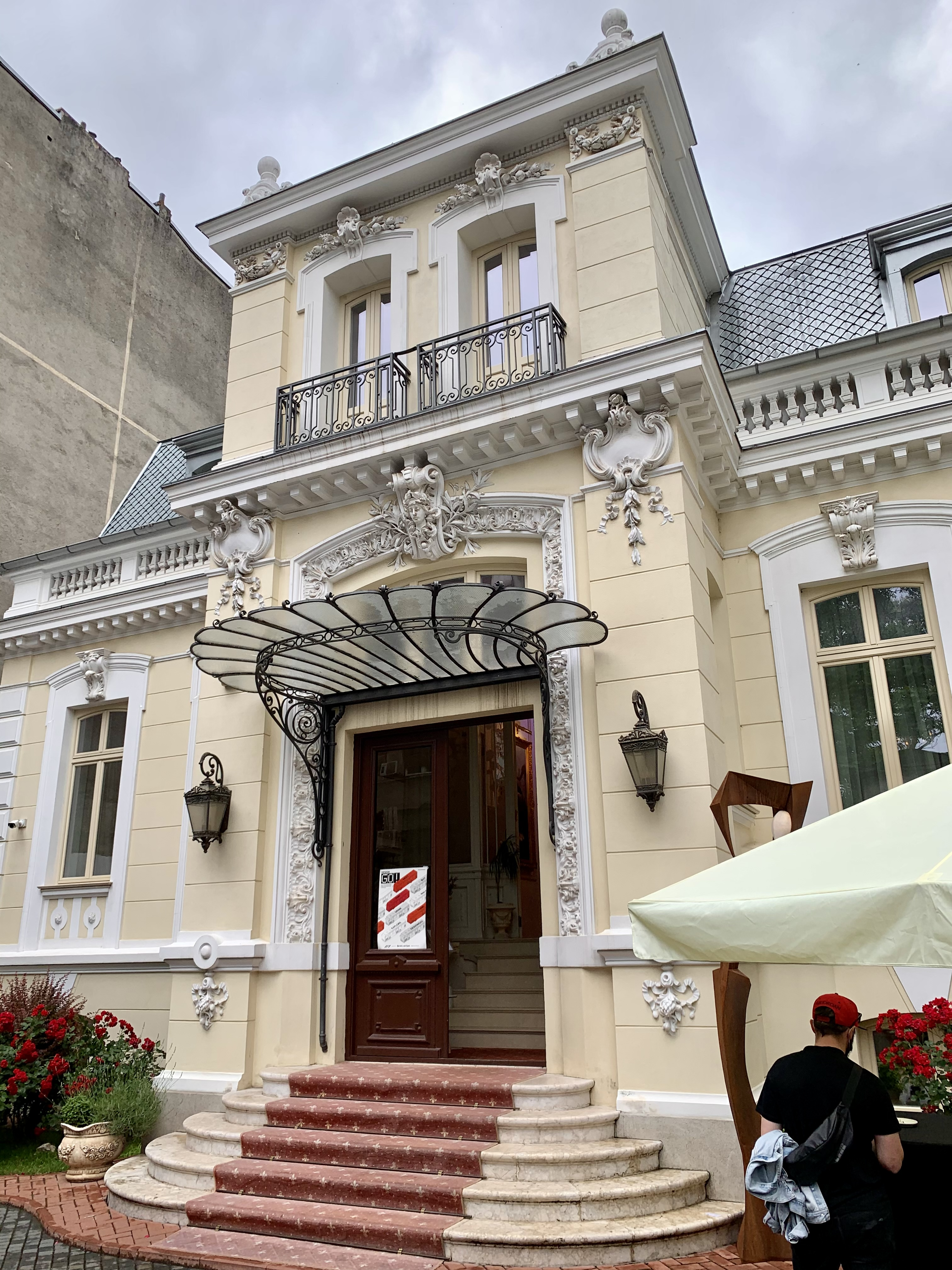
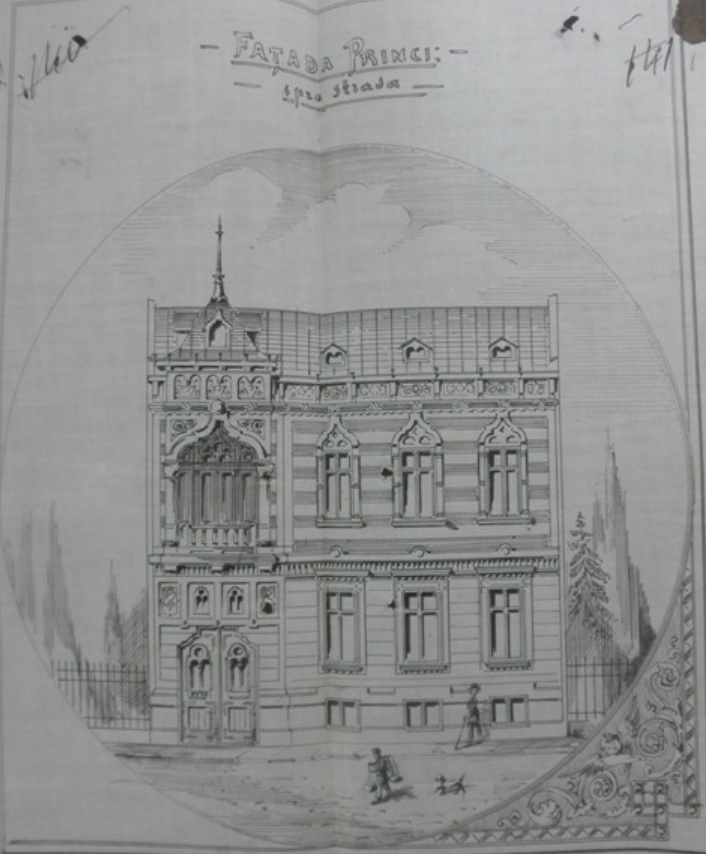
Casa II Amzei Street (nr. 22)
Amzei 22, Bucharest, Romania, 1891

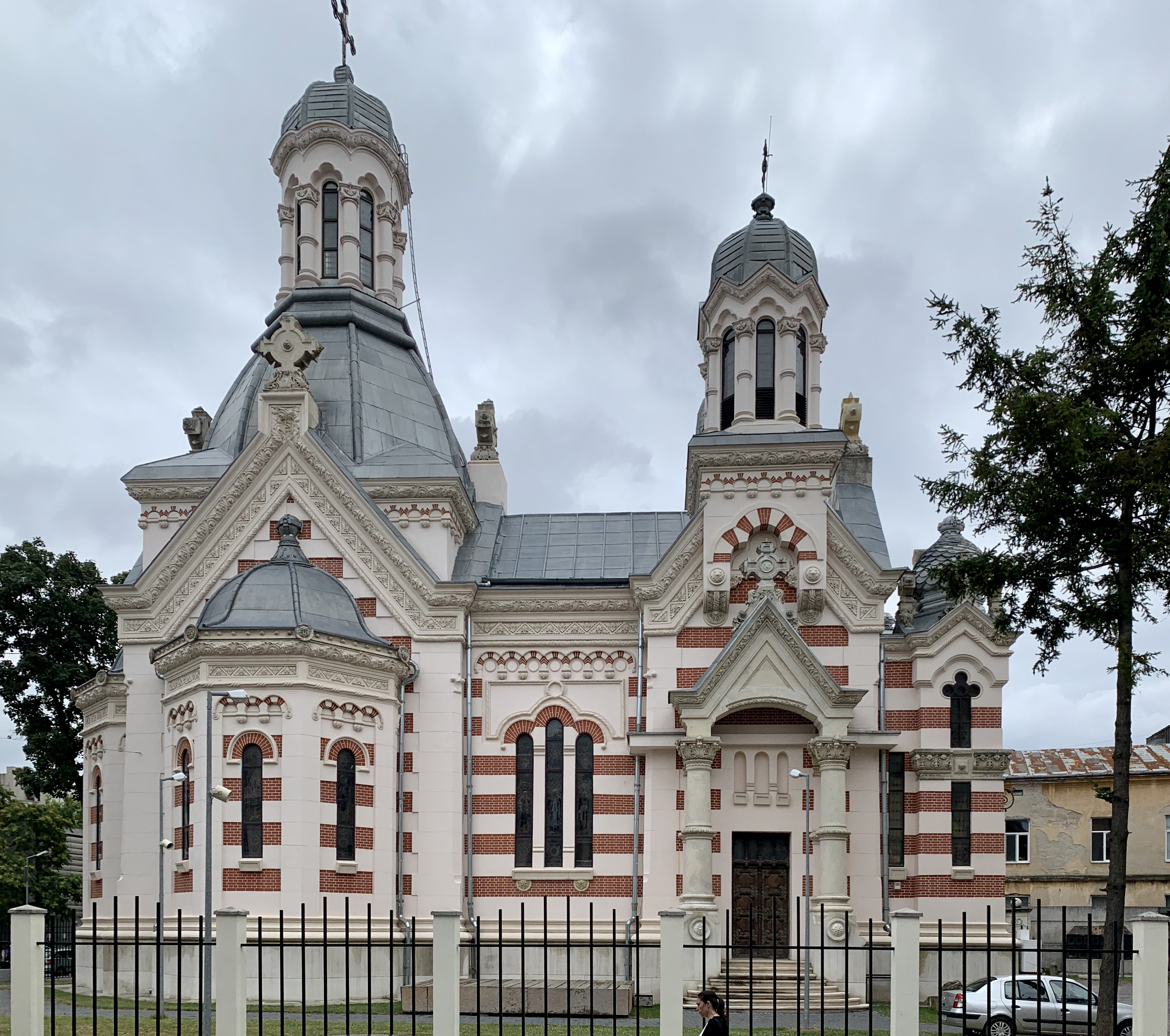
Amzei Church, Bucharest, 1898–1901

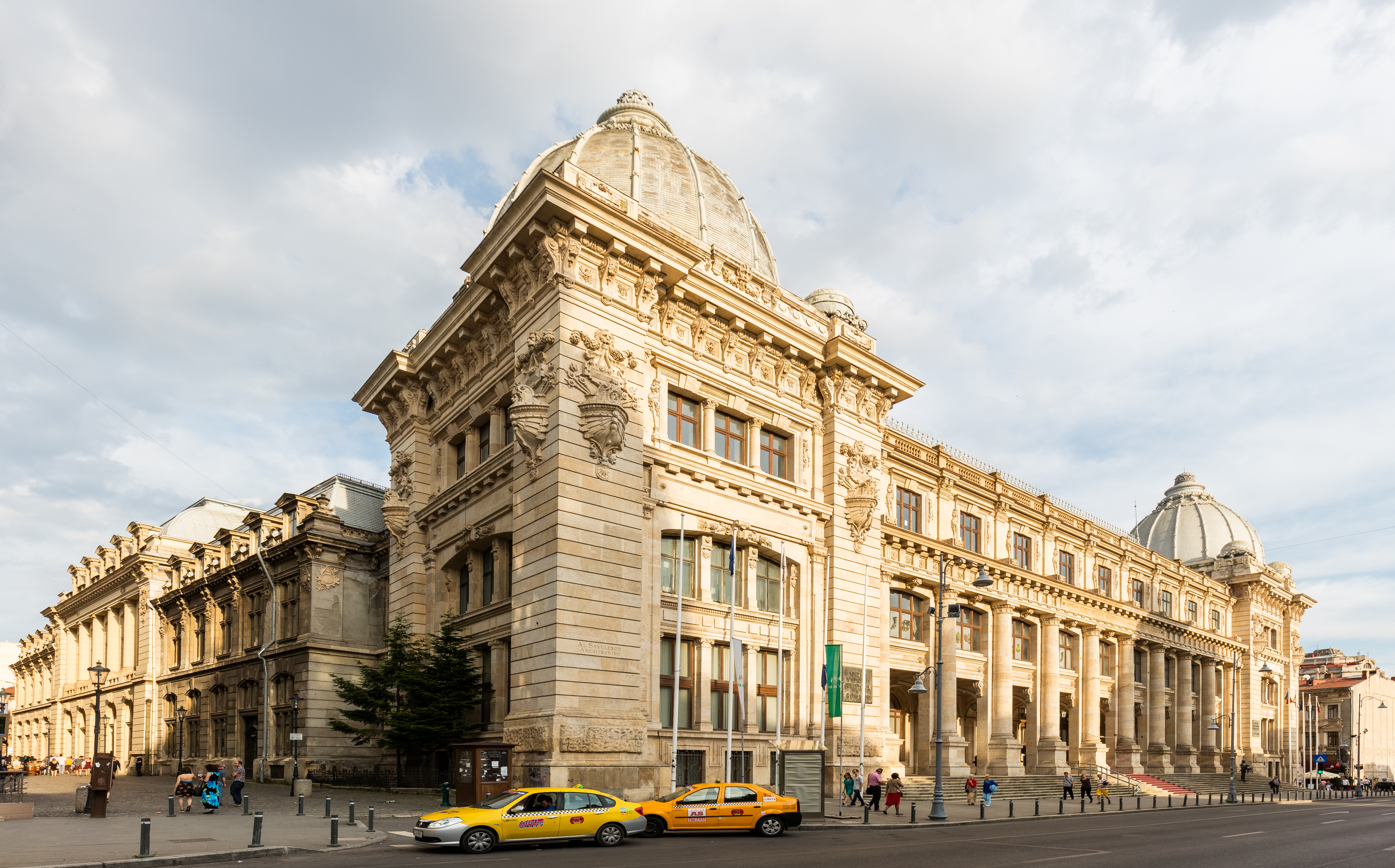
National Museum of Romanian History (the former Central Post Office) on Calea Victoriei, Bucharest, 1894–1900

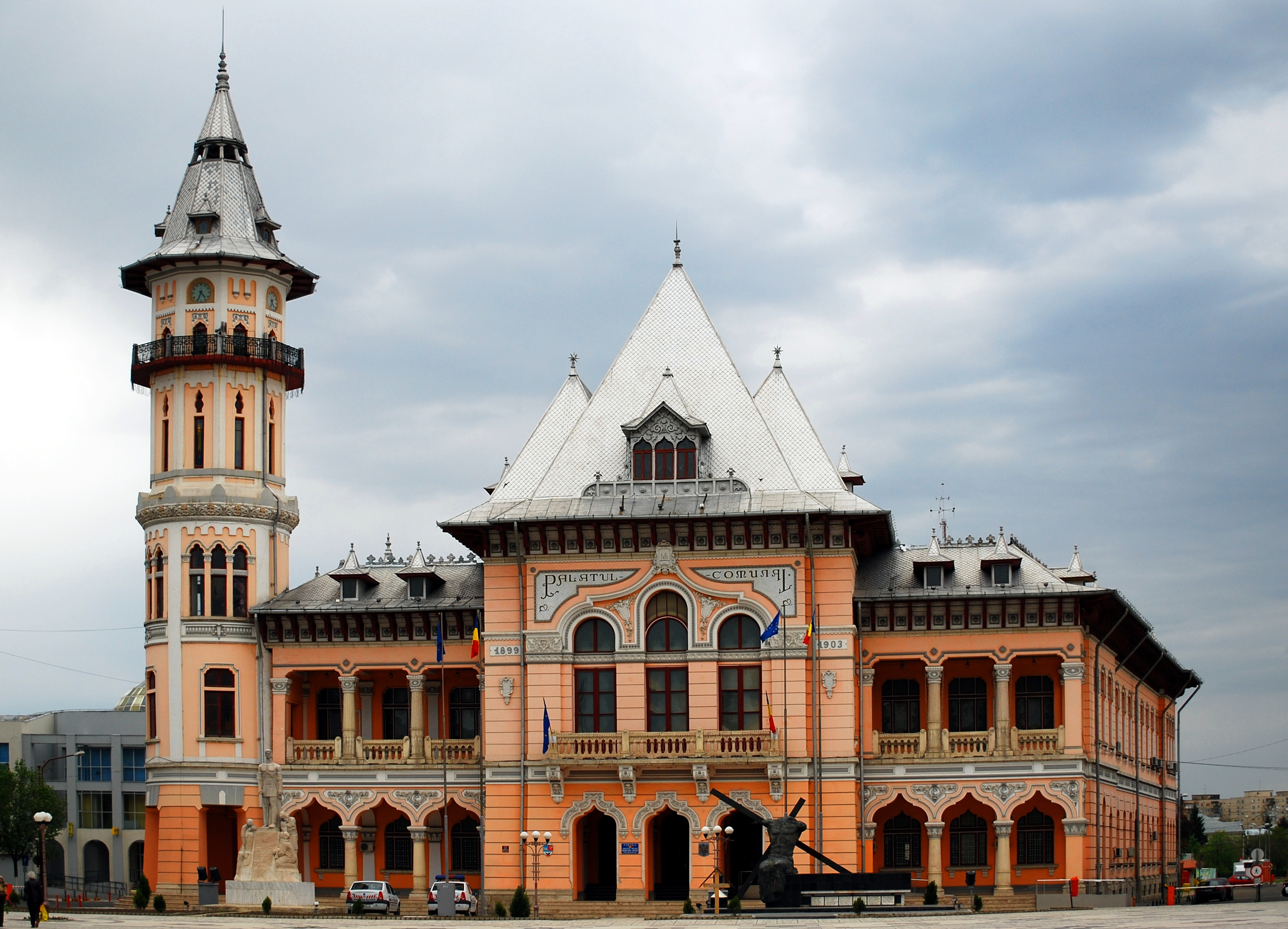
Communal Palace of Buzău, Romania, 1899–1903

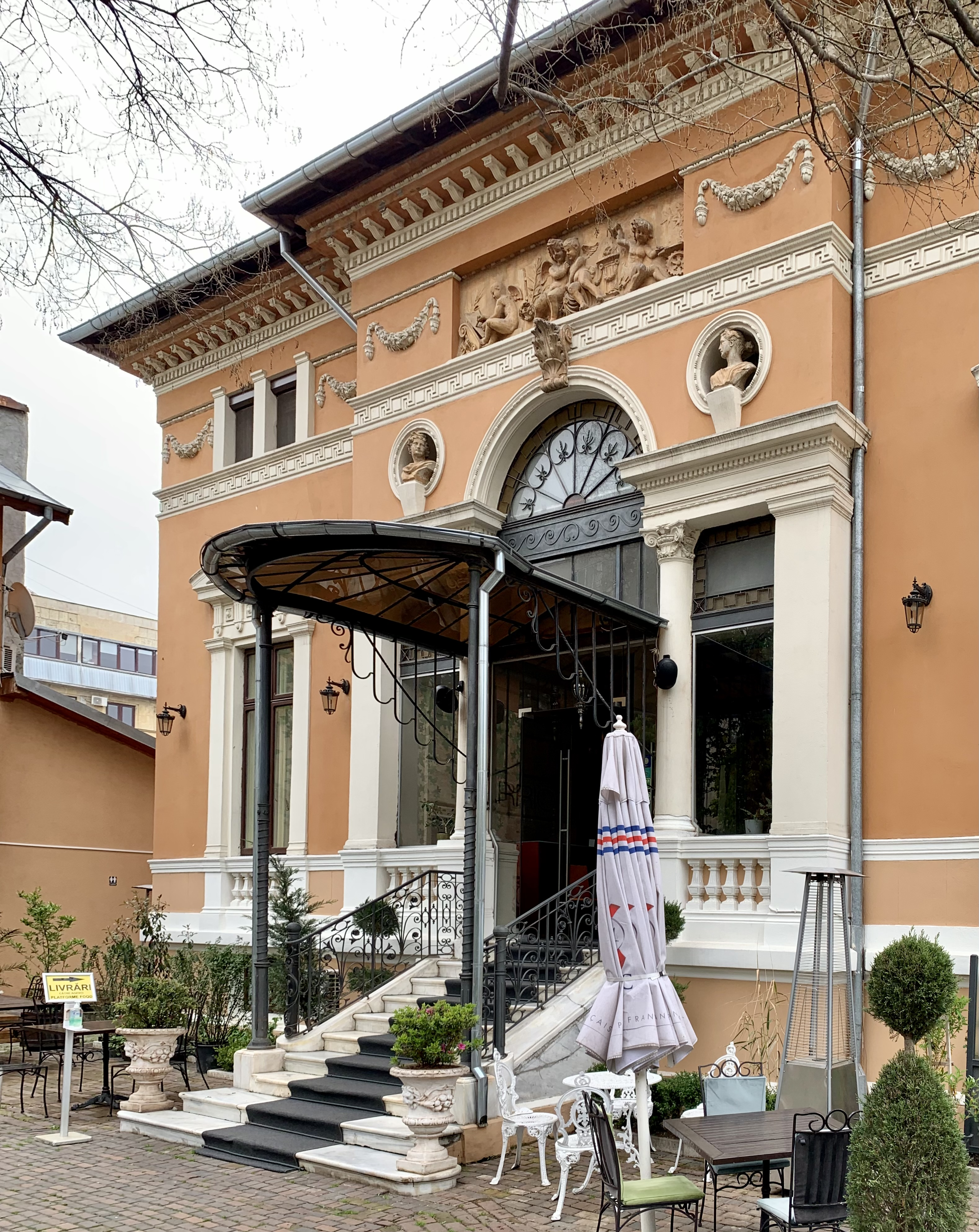
Lascăr Catargiu House on Strada Biserica Amzei, Bucharest, unknown date

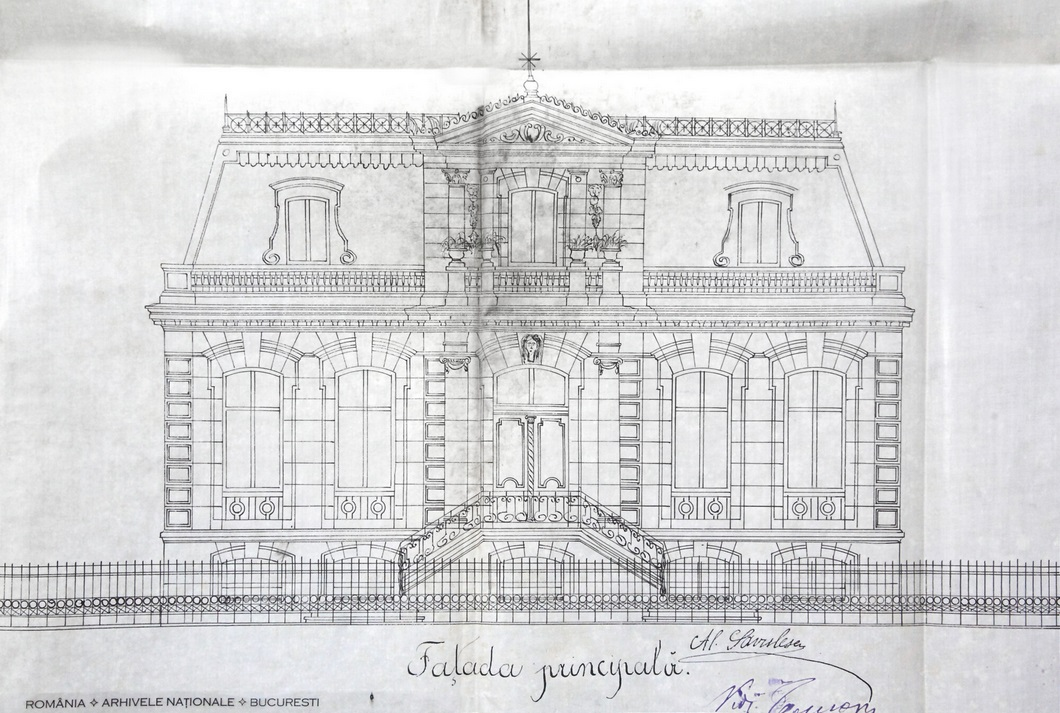
Noblesse Palace 1881
