= Noblesse Oblige (disambiguation) =

Noblesse oblige is a French phrase meaning "nobility obliges".

Noblesse Oblige may also refer to:

== Books ==
- Noblesse Oblige (book), a 1956 humorous book on U and non-U English, nominally edited by Nancy Mitford
- "Noblesse Oblige" (short story), a 1934 short story by P. G. Wodehouse
- Noblesse oblige, an 1851 novel by César Lecat de Bazancourt

== Film and TV ==
- Noblesse oblige, the French title of the 1949 film Kind Hearts and Coronets
- "Noblesse Oblige" (Justified), a 2015 episode of Justified
- "Noblesse Oblige" (Upstairs, Downstairs), a 1975 episode of Upstairs, Downstairs
- "Noblesse Oblige", a 5th episode of 2nd season of Freezing
- Noblesse Oblige (TV series), a 2014 Hong Kong TV series

== Music ==
- Noblesse Oblige (band), a British punk rock duo
- Noblesse Oblige (album), a 2012 album by Italian band Punkreas
- "Noblesse Oblige", also known as Opus #5 Adagio Contabile, an instrumental track on The Crest by Axel Rudi Pell
