= Șimian (island) =

River island in the Danube belonging to Romania

Coordinates: 44°36′36″N 22°41′27″E

Șimian (Serbian: Šimijan) is a river island on the Danube belonging to Romania, located just downstream of the city of Turnu Severin and overlooking the town of Șimian. The island is home to a reconstructed fortress that was relocated from the historic Ada Kaleh island, when it was threatened by the construction of the Iron Gate I dam in 1968. For that reason, it is also known as the "New Ada Kaleh", although the ambitious resettlement plan has never been fully completed.

During the construction of Trajan's Bridge in the 2nd century AD, the island served as a natural base for water-dividing dams.
