= Nicolas Doxat =

Swiss general and urban planner

Nicolas Doxat de Démoret also Nicolas Doxat von Morez (3 November 1682 – 20 March 1738) was a Swiss general in the army of the Habsburg Monarchy. He is also known as the engineer who rebuilt the Kalemegdan Fortress and as the first foreign Belgrade urban planner and builder.

== Biography ==
Nicolas Doxat, born in 1682 in Yverdon, a Swiss canton of Bern, was the son of Joseph zu Démoret (co-lord of Démoret) (1643–1718) and Marguerite von Stürler (b. 1645). They received the noble title of baron from Emperor Ferdianand. His parents were of the Reformed faith (Protestants) and a citizen of Démoret. Nicolas remained single and his wealth was estimated at 30,000 florin in gold). At the age of 18, Nikola Doxat joined the Dutch army, which sends him to school to become a fortification officer. As an engineer officer, he participated in the War of the Spanish Succession and in Flanders (1702–1714). After the siege of Lille, he joined the Austrian Imperial Army, where he advanced rapidly, rising to the rank of general. He participated in the Habsburg-Ottoman war in the Danube region (1716–1718) and in the war in Sicily (1718–1720). He was seriously wounded during the siege of Timisoara. A bullet hit him in the right knee, his left shoulder was crushed, and his left hip was severely injured. Because of these injuries, Nikola Doxat remained crippled for the rest of his life.

== Engineering work ==
As a fortification officer, Nicholas Doxat, by the emperor's special order, had to inspect the fortifications in Vienna and parts of the Kingdom of Hungary and improve them at his discretion. Anyone who saw his sketches even once had to be amazed by their precision. Doxat's idea was to move the strategic points in the defense of the fortification outside the walls, which he tried to achieve in practice already during his first service in Bavaria. However, the young engineer's forward-thinking and unconventional thinking led to him being declared a charlatan and sent to the front in France. Doxat's ideas were later adopted and are considered one of the best improvements in the field of fortification.

== Serving in Serbia ==
After being wounded and leaving the hospital, then with the rank of colonel, Nikola Doxat was assigned to the command of the Kingdom of Serbia. He was given the task to, with free hands, do everything necessary to fortify Belgrade.

== Urbanization of Belgrade ==
Part of the fortress was built according to the plans of Nikola Doxat - Charles VI Gate in the Lower Town with the rest of the north-eastern rampart. The gate is believed to be the work of Balthazar Neumann, a famous German Baroque architect who at one time worked in Belgrade as a military engineer. The gate was built in 1736 in honour of Charles VI, Holy Roman Emperor. Arriving in Belgrade, Nikola Doxat immediately began to rebuild the fortress, as part of the large logistical plans for the fortification of the city. Doxat studied the history of the city, developed his project, and submitted the final version of his urban plan to the Court Council in 1723. Considering that he had permission to do the renovation at his own discretion, the plan was approved and the work began immediately.

The first works related to the construction of seven one-story buildings, among which was the oldest house in Belgrade, today under state protection as a cultural monument. Its construction began in 1724 and ended in 1727, and it was built in the Baroque style. The specificity of this complex of buildings is the network of underground passages that connected them to each other, and it is believed to also be the fortress on Kalemegdan. The court of Eugene of Savoy and the house of Nikola Doxat, which were located in today's Dušanova Street, were connected to the fortress by these tunnels. The length of these underground passages, the routes they pass through and what they connect, due to strategic reasons, most probably only Nikola Doxat himself knew. Allegedly, he kept the plans to himself hidden and never disclosed, not even to his superiors. According to some beliefs, there are tunnels leading from the Belgrade fortress to Zemun, and their role was to supply the city in case of siege and a safe retreat in case of extreme emergency.According to architect Zoran Đukanović, with this reconstruction the fortress was supposed to be the most perfect defense machine and the first impenetrable bastion of defense of the Austro-Hungarian Empire, Europe and Christianity, and the city was to get new, significant public facilities.

== Conflict with Prince Alexander von Wittenberg ==
During his service in Belgrade, Nikola Doxat came into conflict with Prince Alexander von Wittenberg, the man who before him made plans for the reconstruction of Belgrade, but those ideas were dismissed as amateurism. Doxat did not get along well with him and tried to bring him back to Vienna on several occasions, but Alexander was left in Belgrade to participate in large works that were financed even by Pope Benedict XIII. In 1735, Doxat determined that Prince Alexander von Wittenberg was stealing money from the secret funds of the empire, and the disgraced prince was sent back to Vienna. Using the influence and connections he had, he managed to cover up the affair, but he remained determined to take revenge on the Belgrade urban planner Nikola Doxat. The only thing that prevented him was the fact that Doxat, due to an exceptionally well-done job in the fortification and reconstruction of Belgrade, found himself at the mercy of the court and was given the rank of general.

== Defense of Niš fortress ==
Two years later, in 1737, a new Austrian-Turkish war broke out. Suppressing the enemy, the Austrian army reaches as far as Niš and conquers it under the command of generals Ludwig Andreas von Khevenhüller and Friedrich Heinrich von Seckendorff (Frederick's protege, who decides to conquer Novi Pazar as well. In that conflict, the Austrians were beaten by the Turks and during the retreat, Khevenhüller and Seckendorff ordered Doxat to stay in Niš with 8,000 soldiers, in order to secure a retreat. As the Turks are preparing to march on Niš with 80,000 soldiers, Khevenhüller and Seckendorff send Doxat false news that they will send him reinforcements, though they have no intention to do so. In order to avoid the slaughter, Doxat accepted negotiations with the Turks. During the next few days, as long as the negotiations lasted, Doxat orders the army to perform maneuvers to make it appear to the enemy that there are more of them in the city. He managed to convince the Turks that the battle would be difficult for them as well, and effected a peaceful retreat from Niš, without a formal surrender. The enemy believed and agreed that Doxat, without formally surrendering the city, would leave Niš with the army and retreat to Belgrade. Because of this move, some considered him a hero because he saved the army, and others considered him a coward. Both Ludwig Andreas von Khevenhüller and Von Seckendorff, hearing about these events, sends a report full of lies to Vienna, stating that Doxat has violated orders. In order to prevent Doxat's report from reaching the emperor, he arrested him as soon as he arrived in Belgrade with 8,000 rescued soldiers and placed him under house arrest until the trial began, together with his top officers. Meanwhile, Alexander von Wittenberg also continues to plot against Doxat in Vienna, appealing that Doxat must become an example of how to deal with traitors who surrender without a single bullet. Emperor Charles VI eventually relented and decided that Nicolas Doxat should be executed in Belgrade. He was given a summary trial, and the commission sought the death penalty. The verdict for Doxat was as follows:

"The sentence is imposed because on October 16 of last year, without expecting an attack and providing defense, and without need, only on the basis of enemy threats, the Niš fortress, on the front line, which was entrusted to his command, was handed over to the sworn enemy of the Christian name and thereby acted against his honor, duty and conscience; to his imperial and Catholic majesty, as well as to the whole Christian world, inflicting considerable damage and loss, to the imperial arms incalculable shame, strengthening the Turks still more in their arrogance. Therefore, the aforementioned General Doxat is sentenced to death - by cutting off his head. "

== Death of Nicolas Doxat von Morez ==
The evening before the execution of the death sentence, Nikola Doxat had dinner, like every other day, and then slept peacefully. In the morning, he drank tea and prayed, and then he was taken to the slaughterhouse. On the way, he passed the soldiers he saved in Niš and said to them: "Goodbye, my friends, at least you know why I'm dying." His death was a painful one, receiving multiple cuts to the body with a sabre before being beheaded

== Sources ==
- Ćorović, Ljubica M., ed. (2010). Живот царског генерала и славног инжењера господина барона Доксата де Мореза погубљеног 20. марта 1738. у Београду уз опис појединих дешавања у тадашњем рату против Турака. [The life of the imperial general and famous engineer Baron Doxat de Morez executed on March 20, 1738 in Belgrade with a description of certain events in the then war against the Turks.] (in Serbian). Translated by Milorad Sofronijević. Belgrad: Belgrade City library. ISBN 978-86-7191-085-9. Translated from the German Leben des Kaiserlichen Generals und berühmten Ingenieurs Herren Baron Doxat von Morez, welcher Anno 1738 den 20sten Martii zu Belgrad enthauptet worden, nebst besondern Umständen des damaligen Türken-Krieges published in 1757.
