= Noblesse (distillery) =

The Noblesse company was a distillery in Hasselt. It was founded at the end of the 19th century and was active until 1950.

== History ==
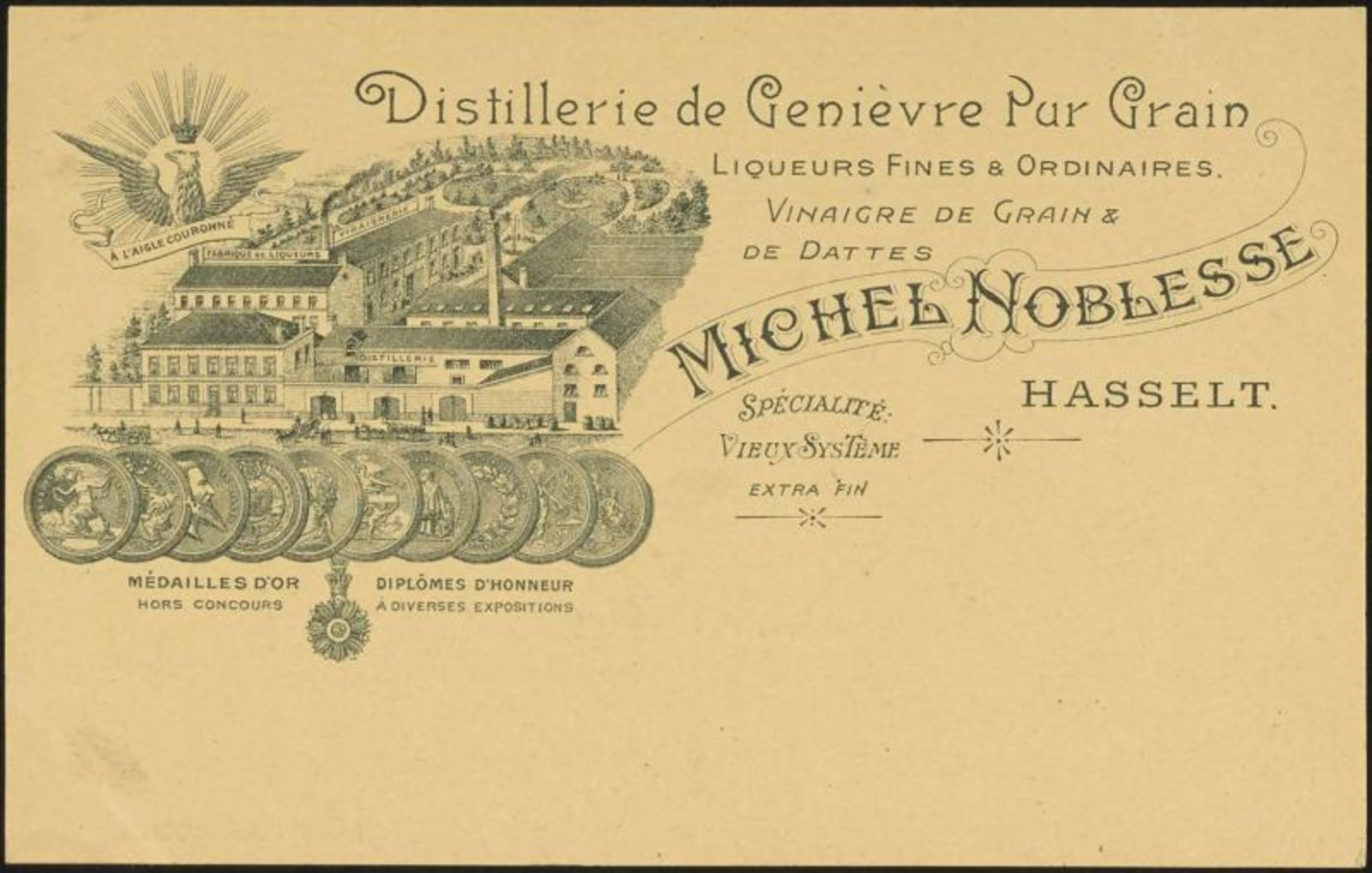
Postcard advertising the distillery

In 1882 Michel Noblesse founded the Distillerie de l’Aigle Couronné on the Koningin Astridlaan in Hasselt.

On 17 October, 1905 the company registered the brand name A L’Aigle Couronné along with its trademark, a crowned eagle with spread wings. In 1909 the Royal Netherlands Yeast and Spirits Factory, which also used an eagle with spread wings as its trademark, sued Noblesse for trademark infringement. On 30 June, 1909 it was agreed that the Noblesse distillery could retain the name but could no longer use its trademark image. Consequently, on 4 February, 1910 the Noblesse Distillery registered a new trademark, featuring an eagle with folded wings.

When Michel Noblesse died in 1912, his son Joseph took over the company renaming it Noblesse.

In 1934 Joseph Noblesse passed the company to his sons, Michel and Guillaume,

Following the disruptions of World War II, Michel resumed operations on a limited scale in 1947 at a new location, 4 Hemelrijk, in Hasselt. The distillery ultimately closed in 1950.

== Production and brands ==
Noblesse's best-known product was Oude Karel / Vieux Carlo, which was registered in 1942. The company also produced the brand Vieux Système Spécial 1830 and an advocaat called Sussex.

Around the turn of the century, like many other jenever and liqueur distillers, Noblesse diversified its product line to include vinegar.

== Promotion and advertising ==
The company had a promotional stand at several World Fairs, including the Liège International Exposition of 1905. In 1910, under the leadership of Michel Noblesse, the distillery was present at the Brussels International Exposition.

Among other things, the company issued playing cards to promote its products.
