= Simion =

Simion is a Romanian-language masculine given name. Notable people with this name include:

- Simion Bărnuțiu
- Simion Bughici
- Simion Coman
- Simion Cuciuc
- Simion Cuţov
- Simion Furdui
- Simion Galeţchi
- Simion Ghimpu
- Simion Grişciuc
- Simion Ismailciuc
- Simion Florea Marian
- Simeon G. Murafa
- Nae-Simion Pleşca
- Simion Popescu
- Simon Schobel
- Simion Stanciu
- Simion Stoilow
- Simion Stolnicu

It may also work as a surname:

- Adrian Simion
- Arnaud Simion
- Eugen Simion
- George Simion

== Arts & media ==
- "Simion", a 1996 episode of the American animated series Dexter's Laboratory

== See also ==
- Simeon
