= 2022–23 Håndboldligaen =

Season of the Danish Handball League

Håndboldligaen
- Season: 2022–23
- Champion: GOG Håndbold (9th title)
- Relegated: HC Midtjylland
- Champions League: Aalborg Håndbold; GOG
- European League: Skjern Håndbold; Skanderborg AGF
- Matches played: 182
- Goals scored: 10,565 (58.05 per match)
- Top goalscorer: Emil Wernsdorf Madsen (252 goals)

The 2022–23 Håndboldligaen (known as the HTH Herreligaen for sponsorship reasons) was the 87th season of the Danish Handball League, the top men's handball league in Denmark. A total of fourteen teams contested this season's league. HC Midtjylland was promoted from the 1st Division.

GOG Håndbold won the title, when they beat Aalborg Håndbold in the finals. This was the second time in a row GOG won the Danish Championship. GOG Håndbold won the regular season as well. HC Midtjylland were relegated, when they finished last in the regular season.

== Teams ==
Locations of the 2022–23 Håndboldligaen

=== Arenas and locations ===
The following 14 clubs competed in the Håndboldligaen during the 2022–23 season:

Team	City	Arena	Capacity
Aalborg Håndbold	Aalborg	Sparekassen Danmark Arena	5,000
Bjerringbro-Silkeborg Håndbold	Silkeborg	Jysk Arena	3.900
Fredericia HK	Fredericia	thansen Arena	2.700
GOG Håndbold	Gudme	Phønix Tag Arena	2.645
HC Midtjylland	Herning	Sportscenter Herning	1.700
KIF Håndbold	Kolding	Sydbank Arena	4.500
Lemvig-Thyborøn Håndbold	Lemvig	Arena Vestjylland Forsikring	1.400
Mors-Thy Håndbold	Nykøbing Mors; Thisted	Sparekassen Thy Arena Mors; Thyhallen	1.500; 1.336
Nordsjælland Håndbold	Helsinge; Helsingør; Hillerød	Helsinge Hallerne; Helsingørhallen; Royal Stage Hillerød	1.500; 2.400; 3.040
Ribe-Esbjerg	Esbjerg; Ribe	Blue Water Dokken; Ribe Fritidscenter	3.570; 2.000
Skanderborg Aarhus Håndbold	Aarhus; Skanderborg	Ceres Arena; Fælledhallen	4.700; 1.790
Skjern Håndbold	Skjern	Skjern Bank Arena	2.400
SønderjyskE	Sønderborg	Broager Sparekasse Skansen	2.200
TTH Holstebro	Holstebro	Gråkjær Arena	3.250

== Regular season ==
=== League table ===
Pos	Team	Pld	W	D	L	GF	GA	GD	Pts	Qualification or relegation
1	Aalborg Håndbold	26	22	1	3	828	710	+118	45	Championship Play-Off + Advance to Champions League
2	GOG Håndbold	26	22	1	3	897	797	+100	45	Championship Play-Off
3	Bjerringbro-Silkeborg	26	18	2	6	785	729	+56	38	Championship Play-Off
4	Skjern Håndbold	26	15	3	8	743	699	+44	33	Championship Play-Off
5	KIF Kolding	26	16	1	9	742	714	+28	33	Championship Play-Off
6	Skanderborg Aarhus Håndbold	26	15	2	9	790	733	+57	32	Championship Play-Off
7	Fredericia HK	26	12	2	12	755	772	−17	26	Championship Play-Off
8	Ribe-Esbjerg HH	26	10	2	14	777	797	−20	22	Championship Play-Off
9	SønderjyskE Herrer	26	10	1	15	734	778	−44	21	
10	Team Tvis Holstebro	26	9	2	15	743	761	−18	20	
11	Mors-Thy Håndbold	26	7	1	18	712	767	−55	15	
12	Nordsjælland Håndbold	26	6	3	17	706	774	−68	15	
13	Lemvig-Thyborøn Håndbold	26	6	0	20	662	761	−99	12	
14	HC Midtjylland	26	3	1	22	691	773	−82	7	Relegated

Updated to match(es) played on 16 February 2025. Source:
Rules for classification: 1) points; 2) Goal difference; 3) Goals scored.

== Second round ==
=== Championship round ===
==== Group 1 ====
Pos	Team	Pld	W	D	L	GF	GA	GD	Pts	Qualification
1	Aalborg Håndbold	6	3	2	1	195	183	+12	10 (Note: Aalborg Håndbold were added two point for in honoration of the Regular season's standings.)	Advance to playoffs
2	Skjern Håndbold	6	4	1	1	177	160	+17	10 (Note: Skjern Håndbold were added one point for in honoration of the Regular season's standings.)	Advance to playoffs
3	Ribe-Esbjerg HH	6	1	3	2	173	187	−14	5	
4	KIF Kolding	6	0	2	4	161	176	−15	2	

Source: Dansk Håndbold
Rules for classification: 1) points; 2) head-to-head points; 3) goal difference; 4) goals scored; 5) head-to-head goal difference; 6) head-to-head number of goals scored.

==== Group 2 ====
Pos	Team	Pld	W	D	L	GF	GA	GD	Pts	Qualification
1	GOG	6	3	2	1	199	196	+3	10 (Note: GOG were added two point for in honoration of the Regular season's standings.)	Advance to Playoffs
2	Fredericia HK	6	4	1	1	188	175	+13	9	Advance to Playoffs
3	Bjerringbro-Silkeborg	6	2	0	4	182	181	+1	5 (Note: Bjerringbro-Silkeborg were added one point for in honoration of the Regular season's standings.)	
4	Skanderborg Aarhus Håndbold	6	1	1	4	162	179	−17	3	

Source: Dansk Håndbold
Rules for classification: 1) points; 2) head-to-head points; 3) goal difference; 4) goals scored; 5) head-to-head goal difference; 6) head-to-head number of goals scored.

== Playoffs ==
=== Semifinals ===
Semifinals were played best-of-three format. Highest ranking team in the regular season plays at home in the second match.

Date				Home team in 1. match	Home team in 2. match	Result		
1. match	2. match	3. match	Agg.	Home team in 1. match	Home team in 2. match	1. match	2. match	3. match
21.05	24.05	28.05	93-78	Aalborg Håndbold	Fredericia HK	31-22	29-30	33-26
21.05	24.05		71-55	GOG	Skjern Håndbold	34-25	37-30	

! Best of three matches. In the case of a tie after the second match, a third match is played. Highest ranking team in the regular season has the home advantage in the first and possible third match.

=== Third place playoff ===
Semifinals were played best-of-three format. Highest ranking team in the regular season plays at home in the second match.

Date			Home team in 1. match	Home team in 2. match	Result			
1. match	2. match	3. match	Home team in 1. match	Home team in 2. match	Agg.	1. match	2. match	3. match
31.05	04.06	10.06	Skjern	Fredericia	2-4	34-23	25-27	25-28

! Best of three matches. In the case of a tie after the second match, a third match is played. Highest ranking team in the regular season has the home advantage in the first and possible third match.

=== Finals ===
Highest ranking team in the regular season plays at home in the second match.

Date			Home team in 1. match	Home team in 2. match	Result			
1. match	2. match	3. match	Home team in 1. match	Home team in 2. match	Agg.	1. match	2. match	1. match
31.05	04.06	10.06	Aalborg Håndbold	GOG	97-97	30-31	34-29	33-37

! Best of three matches. In the case of a tie after the second match, a third match is played. Highest ranking team in the regular season has the home advantage in the first and possible third match.

== Relegation round ==
=== Group stage ===
Pos	Team	Pld	W	D	L	GF	GA	GD	Pts	Qualification or relegation
9	Mors-Thy Håndbold	4	4	0	0	108	101	+7	10 (Note: Mors-Thy Håndbold were added two point for in honoration of the Regular season's standings.)	
10	SønderjyskE Håndbold	4	3	0	1	125	121	+4	8 (Note: SønderjyskE Håndbold were added two point for in honoration of the Regular season's standings.)	
11	TTH Holstebro	4	1	1	2	109	111	−2	4 (Note: TTH Holstebro were added one point for in honoration of the Regular season's standings.)	
12	Nordsjælland Håndbold	4	1	1	2	113	114	−1	4 (Note: Nordsjælland Håndbold were added one point for in honoration of the Regular season's standings.)	
13	Lemvig-Thyborøn Håndbold	4	0	0	4	107	115	−8	0	Qualification for Relegation play-offs

Source: Dansk Håndbold
Rules for classification: 1) points; 2) head-to-head points; 3) goal difference; 4) goals scored; 5) head-to-head goal difference; 6) head-to-head number of goals scored.

=== Promotion/relegation play-offs ===
The second and third placed team in the 1st Division meet in the semifinal. The loser of the relegation group meets the winner in the final.

==== Semifinal ====
Date			Home team in 1. match	Home team in 2. match	Result			
1. match	2. match	3. match	Home team in 1. match	Home team in 2. match	Agg.	1. match	2. match	3. match
21.04	04.05	-	Team Sydhavsøerne	Skive fH	65-61	27-24	28-27	-

! Best of three matches. In the case of a tie after the second match, a third match is played. Highest ranking team in the regular season has the home advantage in the first and possible third match.

==== Final ====
Date			Home team in 1. match	Home team in 2. match	Result			
1. match	2. match	3. match	Home team in 1. match	Home team in 2. match	Agg.	1. match	2. match	3. match
14.05	17.06	-	Lemvig-Thyborøn Håndbold	Team Sydhavsøerne	66-46	32-24	34-22	-

! Best of three matches. In the case of a tie after the second match, a third match is played. Highest ranking team in the regular season has the home advantage in the first and possible third match.

== Statistics ==
=== Top goalscorers ===
Rank	Name	Club	Goals
1	(Denmark) Emil Jakobsen	GOG Håndbold	252
2	(Denmark) Bjarke Christensen	TTH Holstebro	201
3	(Denmark) Mads Kjeldgaard Andersen	Bjerringbro-Silkeborg	200
4	(Denmark) Simon Pytlick	GOG Håndbold	194
5	(Denmark) Lukas Jørgensen	GOG Håndbold	183
6	(Norway) Eivind Tangen	Skjern Håndbold	174
7	(Denmark) Thomas Arnoldsen	Skanderborg Aarhus	165
8	(Denmark) Kristian Stoklund	Fredericia HK	164
9	(Sweden) Felix Claar	Aalborg Håndbold	162
9	(Denmark) Morten Balling	Skanderborg Aarhus	162
9	(Denmark) Andreas Lang	SønderjyskE	162

=== All-star team ===
Position	Name	Team
GK	(Denmark) Christoffer Bonde	Skjern Håndbold
LW	(Denmark) Bjarke Christensen	KIF Kolding
LB	(Denmark) Simon Pytlick	GOG
CB	(Denmark) Thomas Sommer Arnoldsen	Skanderborg-Århus Håndbold
RB	(Denmark) Emil Wernsdorf Madsen	GOG
RW	(Faroe Islands) Hákun West av Teigum	Skanderborg-Århus Håndbold
P	(Denmark) Lukas Lindhard Jørgensen	GOG

=== Coach of the season ===
(Denmark) Nicolej Krickau - GOG Håndbold

== See also ==
- 2022 Danish Cup
- 2022–23 1st Division
