= 2020–21 Håndboldligaen =

Danish handball league season

Håndboldligaen
- Season: 2020–21
- Dates: 1 September 2020 – 16 June 2021
- Champion: Aalborg Håndbold
- Relegated: Aarhus Håndbold (administrative relegation)
- Matches played: 182
- Goals scored: 10,419 (57.25 per match)
- Top goalscorer: Emil Jakobsen (244 goals)
- Total attendance: 57,330
- Average attendance: 274

The 2020–21 Håndboldligaen (known as the HTH Herreligaen for sponsorship reasons) was the 85th season of the Danish Handball League, the top men's handball league in Denmark. A total of fourteen teams contested this season's league. TMS Ringsted were promoted from the 1st Division the previous season.

Aalborg Håndbold won the title, when they beat Bjerringbro-Silkeborg in the finals. GOG Håndbold won the regular season.

== Relegation/promotion ==
TMS Ringsted finished last in the table, and should thus by league rules have been relegated. However, in April 2021, after the conclusion of the regular season, Aarhus Håndbold, was declared bankrupt. Their team was pulled out of the league, and their matches were considered not contested.

Nordsjælland Håndbold won the First Division, the second tier, and was thus promoted to the Håndboldligaen. Skive fH won the First Division play-off round and thus had to meet the worst placed team in the Håndboldligaen relegation round. This would be Aarhus Håndbold, as they had not competed, and thus had not gained any points at all. However, TMS Ringsted decided to appeal the relegation, and it was found that due to Aarhus Håndbold's bankruptcy, they had the right to remain in the league. This was decided after Skive fH had already secured promotion, as Aarhus Håndbold could not compete. This meant that only one team was relegated, but two were promoted. Therefore it was decided that for the following season the league would have 15, not 14 teams.

== Teams ==
Locations of the 2020–21 Håndboldligaen

=== Arenas and locations ===
The following 14 clubs competed in the Håndboldligaen during the 2020–21 season:

Team	Location	Arena	Capacity
Aalborg Håndbold	Aalborg	Jutlander Bank Arena	5,009
Aarhus Håndbold	Aarhus	Ceres Arena	5,001
Bjerringbro-Silkeborg	Bjerringbro	Silkeborg-Hallerne	2,845
Fredericia Håndboldklub	Fredericia	Fredericia Idrætscenter	2,225
GOG	Gudme	Gudme-Hallerne	2,265
KIF Kolding	Kolding	Tre-For Arena	5,182
Lemvig-Thyborøn Håndbold	Lemvig	Vestjysk BANK Arena	1,400
Mors-Thy Håndbold	Nykøbing Mors; Thisted	Jyske Bank Mors Arena; Thy Hallen	2,296; 1,284
Ribe-Esbjerg HH	Esbjerg; Ribe	Blue Water Dokken; Invactor Arena	3,386; 1,976
Skanderborg Aarhus Håndbold	Skanderborg; Aarhus	Fælledhallen; Ceres Arena	1,700; 5,000
Skjern Håndbold	Skjern	Skjern Bank Arena	3,264
SønderjyskE	Sønderborg	Broager Sparekasse Skansen	2,200
TTH Holstebro	Holstebro	Idrætscenter Vest	3,250
TMS Ringsted	Ringsted	Ringsted-Hallen	1,600

== Regular season ==
=== League table ===
Pos	Team	Pld	W	D	L	GF	GA	GD	Pts	Qualification or relegation
1	GOG Håndbold	26	19	4	3	836	739	+97	42	Championship Play-Off + Advance to Champions League
2	Aalborg Håndbold	26	20	1	5	839	742	+97	41	Championship Play-Off
3	Team Tvis Holstebro	26	18	2	6	796	733	+63	38	Championship Play-Off
4	Bjerringbro-Silkeborg	26	17	1	8	719	644	+75	35	Championship Play-Off
5	SønderjyskE Herrer	26	14	1	11	738	750	−12	29	Championship Play-Off
6	Skjern Håndbold	26	14	1	11	743	767	−24	29	Championship Play-Off
7	Skanderborg Håndbold	26	12	3	11	741	738	+3	27	Championship Play-Off
8	KIF Kolding	26	11	2	13	714	756	−42	24	Championship Play-Off
9	Ribe-Esbjerg HH	26	9	2	15	756	755	+1	20	
10	Fredericia HK	26	10	0	16	781	823	−42	20	
11	Mors-Thy Håndbold	26	9	1	16	711	729	−18	19	
12	AGF Håndbold	26	9	0	17	715	744	−29	18	
13	Lemvig-Thyborøn Håndbold	26	5	1	20	676	761	−85	11	
14	TMS Ringsted	26	5	1	20	654	738	−84	11	

Updated to match(es) played on 16 February 2025. Source:
Rules for classification: 1) points; 2) Goal difference; 3) Goals scored.

== Second round ==
=== Championship round ===
==== Group 1 ====
Pos	Team	Pld	W	D	L	GF	GA	GD	Pts	Qualification
1	GOG	6	5	1	0	211	181	+30	13 (Note: GOG were added two point for in honoration of the Regular season's standings.)	Advance to playoffs
2	Bjerringbro-Silkeborg	6	2	1	3	188	184	+4	6 (Note: Bjerringbro-Silkeborg were added one point for in honoration of the Regular season's standings.)	Advance to playoffs
3	SønderjyskE Herrer	6	3	0	3	184	188	−4	6	
4	KIF Kolding	6	1	0	5	170	200	−30	2	

Source: Danish Handball Federation (in Danish), Flashscore
Rules for classification: 1) points; 2) head-to-head points; 3) goal difference; 4) goals scored; 5) head-to-head goal difference; 6) head-to-head number of goals scored.

==== Group 2 ====
Pos	Team	Pld	W	D	L	GF	GA	GD	Pts	Qualification
1	TTH Holstebro	6	5	0	1	201	182	+19	11	Advance to Playoffs
2	Aalborg Håndbold	6	3	1	2	195	182	+13	9 (Note: Aalborg Håndbold were added two point for in honoration of the Regular season's standings.)	Advance to Playoffs
3	Skjern Håndbold	6	2	1	3	174	188	−14	5 (Note: TTH Holstebro were added one point for in honoration of the Regular season's standings.)	
4	Skanderborg Håndbold	6	1	0	5	167	185	−18	2	

Source: Danish Handball Federation (in Danish), Flashscore
Rules for classification: 1) points; 2) head-to-head points; 3) goal difference; 4) goals scored; 5) head-to-head goal difference; 6) head-to-head number of goals scored.

== Playoffs ==
=== Semifinals ===
Semifinals were played best-of-three format. Highest ranking team in the regular season plays at home in the second match.

Dato			Home team in 1. match	Home team in 2. match	Result	
1. match	2. match	Agg.	Home team in 1. match	Home team in 2. match	1. match	2. match
24.05	27.05	52-57	Holstebro	Bjerringbro-Silkeborg	27-27	30-25
24.05	27.05	58-63	GOG Håndbold	Aalborg Håndbold	28-30	33-30

! Best of three matches. In the case of a tie after the second match, a third match is played. Highest ranking team in the regular season has the home advantage in the first and possible third match.

=== Third place playoff ===
Semifinals were played best-of-three format. Highest ranking team in the regular season plays at home in the second match.

Date			Home team in 1. match	Home team in 2. match	Result			
1. match	2. match	3. match	Home team in 1. match	Home team in 2. match	Agg.	1. match	2. match	3. match
02.06	07.06	16.06	GOG Håndbold	TTH Holstebro	104-96	33-28	39-38	33-29

! Best of three matches. In the case of a tie after the second match, a third match is played. Highest ranking team in the regular season has the home advantage in the first and possible third match.

=== Finals ===
Highest ranking team in the regular season plays at home in the second match.

Date			Home team in 1. match	Home team in 2. match	Result			
1. match	2. match	3. match	Home team in 1. match	Home team in 2. match	Agg.	1. match	2. match	1. match
02.06	08.06	16.06	Aalborg Håndbold	Bjerringbro-Silkeborg	98-91	37-34	30-29	32-27

! Best of three matches. In the case of a tie after the second match, a third match is played. Highest ranking team in the regular season has the home advantage in the first and possible third match.

== Statistics ==
=== Top goalscorers ===
Rank	Name	Club	Goals
1	(Denmark) Emil Jakobsen	GOG Håndbold	244
2	(Netherlands) Kay Smits	TTH Holstebro	200
3	(Denmark) Aaron Mensing	TTH Holstebro	186
4	(Denmark) Mathias Gidsel	GOG Håndbold	173
5	(Sweden) Lukas Sandell	Aalborg Håndbold	172
6	(Denmark) Magnus Bramming	TTH Holstebro	171
6	(Denmark) Morten Hempel Jensen	TMS Ringsted	171
8	(Denmark) Peter Balling	KIF Kolding	170
9	(Denmark) Jacob Lassen	Bjerringbro-Silkeborg	155
10	(Denmark) Nikolaj Læsø	Aalborg Håndbold	153

=== All-star team ===
Position	Name	Team
GK	Josip Cavar	SønderjyskE Håndbold
LW	Emil Manfeldt Jakobsen	GOG
LB	Aaron Mensing	Team Tvis Holstebro
CB	Morten Olsen	GOG
RB	Peter Balling	KIF Kolding
RW	Andreas Flodman	KIF Kolding
P	Magnus Saugstrup	Aalborg Håndbold

=== Coach of the season ===
(Sweden) Stefan Madsen - Aalborg Håndbold

== See also ==
- 2021 Danish Cup
- 2021–22 1st Division
