= 2023–24 Håndboldligaen =

Season of the Danish Handball League

Håndboldligaen
- Season: 2023–24
- Champion: Aalborg Håndbold (7th title)
- Relegated: Lemvig-Thyborøn Håndbold
- Champions League: Aalborg Håndbold; GOG; Fredericia HK
- European League: BSH
- Matches played: 182
- Top goalscorer: Emil Wernsdorf Madsen (192 goals)

The 2023–24 Håndboldligaen (known as the HTH Herreligaen for sponsorship reasons) was the 88th season of the Danish Handball League, the top men's handball league in Denmark. A total of fourteen teams contested this season's league. TMS Ringsted was promoted from the 1st Division.

Aalborg Håndbold won the title, when they beat Fredericia HK in the finals. Aalborg Håndbold also won the regular season. Lemvig-Thyborøn Håndbold were relegated, when they finished last in the regular season.

== Teams ==
Locations of the 2023–24 Håndboldligaen

=== Arenas and locations ===
The following 14 clubs competed in the Håndboldligaen during the 2023–24 season:

Team	City	Arena	Capacity
Aalborg Håndbold	Aalborg	Sparekassen Danmark Arena	5,000
Bjerringbro-Silkeborg Håndbold	Silkeborg	Jysk Arena	3.900
Fredericia HK	Fredericia	thansen Arena	2.700
GOG Håndbold	Gudme	Phønix Tag Arena	2.645
TMS Ringsted	Ringsted	Ringsted-Hallen	1,600
KIF Håndbold	Kolding	Sydbank Arena	4.500
Lemvig-Thyborøn Håndbold	Lemvig	Arena Vestjylland Forsikring	1.400
Mors-Thy Håndbold	Nykøbing Mors; Thisted	Sparekassen Thy Arena Mors; Thyhallen	1.500; 1.336
Nordsjælland Håndbold	Helsinge; Helsingør; Hillerød	Helsinge Hallerne; Helsingørhallen; Royal Stage Hillerød	1.500; 2.400; 3.040
Ribe-Esbjerg	Esbjerg; Ribe	Blue Water Dokken; Ribe Fritidscenter	3.570; 2.000
Skanderborg Aarhus Håndbold	Aarhus; Skanderborg	Ceres Arena; Fælledhallen	4.700; 1.790
Skjern Håndbold	Skjern	Skjern Bank Arena	2.400
SønderjyskE	Sønderborg	Broager Sparekasse Skansen	2.200
TTH Holstebro	Holstebro	Gråkjær Arena	3.250

== Regular season ==
=== League table ===
Pos	Team	Pld	W	D	L	GF	GA	GD	Pts	Qualification or relegation
1	Aalborg Håndbold	26	22	2	2	839	710	+129	46	Championship Play-Off + Advance to Champions League
2	Fredericia HK	26	18	3	5	758	705	+53	39	Championship Play-Off
3	GOG Håndbold	26	15	3	8	862	791	+71	33	Championship Play-Off
4	Bjerringbro-Silkeborg	26	14	3	9	768	730	+38	31	Championship Play-Off
5	Mors-Thy Håndbold	26	12	7	7	798	769	+29	31	Championship Play-Off
6	Skjern Håndbold	26	11	4	11	736	730	+6	26	Championship Play-Off
7	TMS Ringsted	26	12	2	12	751	786	−35	26	Championship Play-Off
8	Ribe-Esbjerg HH	26	12	1	13	780	785	−5	25	Championship Play-Off
9	Skanderborg Aarhus Håndbold	26	11	2	13	680	712	−32	24	
10	SønderjyskE	26	9	4	13	740	754	−14	22	
11	Team Tvis Holstebro	26	8	2	16	735	789	−54	18	
12	KIF Kolding	26	6	4	16	744	774	−30	16	
13	Nordsjælland Håndbold	26	5	4	17	729	786	−57	14	
14	Lemvig-Thyborøn Håndbold	26	4	5	17	704	803	−99	13	Relegated

Rules for classification: 1) points; 2) Goal difference; 3) Goals scored.

== Second round ==
=== Championship round ===
==== Group 1 ====
Pos	Team	Pld	W	D	L	GF	GA	GD	Pts	Qualification
1	Aalborg Håndbold	6	4	2	0	204	164	+40	12 (Note: Aalborg Håndbold were added two point for in honoration of the Regular season's standings.)	Advance to playoffs
2	Ribe-Esbjerg HH	6	3	1	2	186	196	−10	7	Advance to playoffs
3	Bjerringbro-Silkeborg	6	1	1	4	189	192	−3	4 (Note: Bjerringbro-Silkeborg were added one point for in honoration of the Regular season's standings.)	
4	Mors-Thy Håndbold	6	2	0	4	168	195	−27	4	

Source: Dansk Håndbold
Rules for classification: 1) points; 2) head-to-head points; 3) goal difference; 4) goals scored; 5) head-to-head goal difference; 6) head-to-head number of goals scored.

==== Group 2 ====
Pos	Team	Pld	W	D	L	GF	GA	GD	Pts	Qualification
1	Fredericia HK	6	3	0	3	175	165	+10	8 (Note: Fredericia HK were added two point for in honoration of the Regular season's standings.)	Advance to Playoffs
2	Skjern Håndbold	6	4	0	2	184	172	+12	8	Advance to Playoffs
3	GOG	6	3	0	3	185	186	−1	7 (Note: GOG were added one point for in honoration of the Regular season's standings.)	
4	TMS Ringsted	6	2	0	4	168	189	−21	4	

Source: Dansk Håndbold
Rules for classification: 1) points; 2) head-to-head points; 3) goal difference; 4) goals scored; 5) head-to-head goal difference; 6) head-to-head number of goals scored.

== Playoffs ==
=== Semifinals ===
Semifinals were played best-of-three format. Highest ranking team in the regular season plays at home in the second match.

Date			Home team in 1st match and 3rd match	Home team in 2nd match	Result			
1. match	2. match	3. match	Home team in 1st match and 3rd match	Home team in 2nd match	Agg.	1. match	2. match	3. match
16.05	19.05		63-51	Aalborg Håndbold	Skjern Håndbold	29-26	34-25	
16.05	19.05	22.05	84-75	Fredericia HK	Ribe-Esbjerg	27-27	23-23	34-25

! Best of three matches. In the case of a tie after the second match, a third match is played. Highest ranking team in the regular season has the home advantage in the first and possible third match.

=== Third place playoff ===
Semifinals were played best-of-three format. Highest ranking team in the regular season plays at home in the second match.

Date			Home team in 1st match and 3rd match	Home team in 2nd match	Result			
1. match	2. match	3. match	Home team in 1st match and 3rd match	Home team in 2nd match	Agg.	1. match	2. match	3. match
26.05	29.05	01.06	Skjern	Ribe-Esbjerg	102-91	31-35	32-25	39-31

! Best of three matches. In the case of a tie after the second match, a third match is played. Highest ranking team in the regular season has the home advantage in the first and possible third match.

=== Finals ===
Highest ranking team in the regular season plays at home in the second match.

Date			Home team in 1st match and 3rd match	Home team in 2nd match	Result			
1. match	2. match	3. match	Home team in 1st match and 3rd match	Home team in 2nd match	Agg.	1. match	2. match	1. match
26.05	29.05	01.06	Aalborg Håndbold	Fredericia HK	88-82	31-26	30-31	27-26

! Best of three matches. In the case of a tie after the second match, a third match is played. Highest ranking team in the regular season has the home advantage in the first and possible third match.

== Relegation round ==
=== Group stage ===
Pos	Team	Pld	W	D	L	GF	GA	GD	Pts	Qualification or relegation
9	SønderjyskE Håndbold	4	3	0	1	112	110	+2	8 (Note: SønderjyskE Håndbold were added two point for in honoration of the Regular season's standings.)	
10	KIF Kolding	4	3	0	1	129	117	+12	7 (Note: KIF Kolding were added one point for in honoration of the Regular season's standings.)	
11	Skanderborg Aarhus Håndbold	4	1	0	3	108	117	−9	4 (Note: Skanderborg Aarhus were added two point for in honoration of the Regular season's standings.)	
12	Nordsjælland Håndbold	4	2	0	2	115	116	−1	4	
13	TTH Holstebro	4	1	0	3	118	122	−4	3 (Note: TTH Holstebro were added one point for in honoration of the Regular season's standings.)	Qualification for Relegation play-offs

Source: Dansk Håndbold
Rules for classification: 1) points; 2) head-to-head points; 3) goal difference; 4) goals scored; 5) head-to-head goal difference; 6) head-to-head number of goals scored.

=== Promotion/relegation play-offs ===
The second and third placed team in the 1st Division meet in the semifinal. The loser of the relegation group meets the winner in the final.

==== Semifinal ====
Date		Home team in 1st match	Home team in 2nd match	Result		
1. match	2. match	Home team in 1st match	Home team in 2nd match	Agg.	1. match	2. match
04.04	09.04	HC Midtjylland	Skive fH	53-62	25-29	33-28

! Best of three matches. In the case of a tie after the second match, a third match is played. Highest ranking team in the regular season has the home advantage in the first and possible third match.

==== Final ====
Date		Home team in 1st match	Home team in 2nd match	Result		
1. match	2. match	Home team in 1st match	Home team in 2nd match	Agg.	1. match	2. match
22.04	26.04	TTH Holstebro	Skive fH	63-52	29-24	28-34

! Best of three matches. In the case of a tie after the second match, a third match is played. Highest ranking team in the regular season has the home advantage in the first and possible third match.

== Statistics ==
=== Top goalscorers ===
Rank	Name	Club	Goals
1	(Denmark) Emil Madsen	GOG Håndbold	231
2	(Denmark) Nicolaj Jørgensen	SønderjyskE Håndbold	227
3	(Denmark) Tobias Nielsen	TMS Ringsted	204
4	(Denmark) Jeppe Gade	Lemvig-Thyborøn Håndbold	200
5	(France) Noah Gaudin	Skjern Håndbold	186
6	(Denmark) Anders Kragh Martinusen	Fredericia HK	181
7	(Norway) William Aar	Ribe-Esbjerg HH	180
8	(Denmark) Morten Hempel Jensen	Skanderborg Aarhus Håndbold	166
9	(Denmark) Mathias Jørgensen	Ribe-Esbjerg HH	165
10	(Denmark) Aaron Mensing	GOG	158

=== Goalkeepers ===
Best goalkeepers (minimum 10 games)
Rank	Name	Team	Saves (penalty saves)	Save %	Games
1	(Denmark) Niklas Landin Jacobsen	Aalborg Håndbold	287 (11)	36,9	33
2	(Denmark) Sebastian Frandsen	Bjerringbro-Silkeborg	357 (11)	33,2	38
3	(Denmark) Christoffer Bonde	Skjern Håndbold	448 (9)	32,9	37
4	(Denmark) Magnus Brandbyge	KIF Kolding	240 (8)	32,0	28
5	(Denmark) Rasmus Henriksen	Mors-Thy Håndbold	204 (4)	31,9	27
6	(Norway) Sander Heieren	Team Tvis Holstebro	293 (11)	31,6	30
7	(Denmark) Mikkel Løvkvist	Bjerringbro-Silkeborg	331 (16)	31,5	32
8	(Denmark) Salah Boutaf	Skanderborg-Århus	249 (11)	30,9	30
9	(Denmark) Thorsten Fries	Fredericia HK	104 (12)	30,8	29
10	(Sweden) Anton Hellberg	KIF Kolding	86 (8)	30,2	18
source: tophaandbold.dk, Updated: 30. Juni 2024

=== Coach of the season ===
(Denmark) Marc Uhd

== See also ==
- 2023 Danish Cup
- 2023–24 1st Division
