= 2013–14 Håndboldligaen (men's handball) =

Håndboldligaen
- Season: 2013–14
- Dates: 24 August 2013 - 16 May 2014
- Champions: KIF Kolding København (13th title)
- Relegated: Skive fH; Nordsjælland; TMS Ringsted
- Champions League: KIF Kolding København; AaB Håndbold
- EHF Cup: Team Tvis Holstebro; Skjern
- Matches: 218
- Goals: 12,030 (55.18 per match)
- Top goalscorer: (Denmark) Henrik Møllgaard (228 goals)

The 2013–14 Håndboldligaen is the 78th season of the Håndboldligaen, Denmark's premier Handball league.

KIF Kolding København won the championship, when they beat AaB Håndbold in the final. TMS Ringsted were relegated, when they finished last in the regular season. Skive fH and Nordsjælland Håndbold were relegated, as they finished bottom of each of their relegation groups.

== Team information ==
Locations of the 2013–14 Håndboldligaen

The following 14 clubs compete in the Håndboldligaen during the 2013–14 season:

Team	Location	Arena	Capacity
AaB Håndbold	Aalborg	Gigantium	4,500
Aarhus GF	Aarhus	NRGi Arena	4,700
Bjerringbro-Silkeborg	Bjerringbro	Silkeborg-Hallerne	3,900
GOG Svendborg	Gudme	Gudme-Hallerne	
KIF Kolding København	Kolding	Kolding Hallen	2,650
Mors-Thy	Nykøbing Mors	Jyske Bank Mors Arena	1,500
Nordsjælland	Helsinge	Helsinge-Hallen	1,600
Ribe-Esbjerg	Ribe	Ribe Fritidscenter	2,200
Skanderborg	Skanderborg	Morten Børup Hallen	
Skjern	Skjern	Skjern Bank Arena	2,400
Skive fH	Skive	Skivehallerne	
SønderjyskE	Sønderborg	Broager Sparekasse Skansen	2,200
Team Tvis Holstebro	Holstebro	Idrætscenter Vest	3,250
TMS Ringsted	Ringsted	Ringsted-Hallen	1,600

=== Personnel and kits ===
Following is the list of clubs competing in 2013–14 Håndboldligaen, with their manager, captain, kit manufacturer and shirt sponsor.

Team	President	Head coach	Kit manufacturer	Shirt sponsor
KIF Kolding	Jens Boesen	(Bosnia and Herzegovina) Bilal Šuman	kempa	TREFOR

== Regular season ==
=== Standings ===
	Team	Pld	W	D	L	GF	GA	Diff	Pts
1	KIF Kolding København	26	21	1	4	702	598	+104	43
2	Skjern Håndbold	26	21	0	5	793	640	+153	42
3	Team Tvis Holstebro	26	18	3	5	740	648	+92	39
4	AaB Håndbold	26	18	2	6	694	635	+58	38
5	SønderjyskE	26	13	6	7	701	670	+31	32
6	GOG Svendborg	26	14	3	9	731	673	+58	31
7	Aarhus GF	26	15	1	10	663	657	+6	31
8	Bjerringbro-Silkeborg	26	14	1	11	687	668	+19	29
9	Skanderborg Håndbold	26	13	1	12	708	709	−1	27
10	Mors-Thy Håndbold	26	8	0	18	637	690	−53	16
11	Nordsjælland Håndbold	26	5	1	20	636	764	−128	11
12	Ribe-Esbjerg HH	26	5	1	20	681	746	−65	11
13	Skive fH	26	4	1	21	556	671	−115	9
14	TMS Ringsted	26	1	3	22	609	768	−159	5

Championship Round
Relegation Round
Relegation

Pld - Played; W - Won; L - Lost; PF - Points for; PA - Points against; Diff - Difference; Pts - Points. Source:

== Championship Round ==
=== Group 1 ===
	Team	Pld	W	D	L	GF	GA	Diff	Pts
1	KIF Kolding København	6	4	0	2	150	134	+16	10
2	AaB Håndbold	6	3	0	3	143	136	+7	7
3	SønderjyskE	6	3	0	3	144	150	−6	6
4	Bjerringbro-Silkeborg	6	2	0	4	147	167	−17	4

Championship Playoff

Pld - Played; W - Won; L - Lost; PF - Points for; PA - Points against; Diff - Difference; Pts - Points.

==== Results (Group 1) ====
In the table below the home teams are listed on the left and the away teams along the top.

	AaB Håndbold	Bjerringbro SV	KIF Kolding København	SønderjyskE
AaB Håndbold		22–24	23–16	23–15
Bjerringbro-Silkeborg	23–31		23–27	23–20
KIF Kolding København	26–17	32–22		26–25
SønderjyskE	32–28	20–22	24–23	

=== Group 2 ===
	Team	Pld	W	D	L	GF	GA	Diff	Pts
1	Skjern Håndbold	6	3	1	2	166	164	+3	9
2	Tvis Holstebro	6	4	0	2	180	167	+13	7
3	GOG Svendborg	6	4	1	1	167	155	+12	7
4	Aarhus GF	6	0	0	6	160	188	−28	0

Championship Playoff

Pld - Played; W - Won; L - Lost; PF - Points for; PA - Points against; Diff - Difference; Pts - Points.

==== Results (Group 2) ====
In the table below the home teams are listed on the left and the away teams along the top.

	Aarhus GF	GOG Svendborg	Skjern Håndbold	Team Tvis Holstebro
Aarhus GF		27–30	27–38	27–30
GOG Svendborg	26–22		23–23	30–27
Skjern Håndbold	31–27	22–30		29–28
Team Tvis Holstebro	33–30	34–28	28–23	

== Championship Playoffs ==
Teams in bold won the playoff series. Numbers to the left of each team indicate the team's original playoff seeding. Numbers to the right indicate the score of each playoff game.

Semifinaler
Team Tvis Holstebro	23	23	**46**
**KIF Kolding København**	25	24	**49**
**AaB Håndbold**	27	28	**55**
Skjern Håndbold	26	27	**53**

Finale
**KIF Kolding København**	23	19	**42**
AaB Håndbold	18	17	**35**

== Relegation Round ==
=== Group 1 ===
	Team	Pld	W	D	L	GF	GA	Diff	Pts
1	Skanderborg	6	5	0	1	170	154	+16	**12**
2	Lemvig-Thyborøn	6	3	0	3	165	165	0	**6**
3	Odder Håndbold	6	3	0	3	166	170	−4	**6**
4	Nordsjælland	6	1	0	5	168	180	−12	**3**

Relegation Playoff
Relegation

Pld - Played; W - Won; L - Lost; PF - Points for; PA - Points against; Diff - Difference; Pts - Points.

==== Results (Group 1) ====
In the table below the home teams are listed on the left and the away teams along the top.

	Lemvig-Thyborøn	Odder Håndbold	Nordsjælland	Skanderborg
Lemvig-Thyborøn		22–27	33–29	27–28
Odder Håndbold	24–29		36–33	23–27
Nordsjælland	28–29	30–25		23–27
Skanderborg	29–25	29–31	30–25	

=== Group 2 ===
	Team	Pld	W	D	L	GF	GA	Diff	Pts
1	Mors-Thy Håndbold	6	3	2	1	145	124	+21	**10**
2	Ribe-Esbjerg HH	6	3	3	0	151	146	+5	**10**
3	Sydhavsøerne	6	2	1	3	131	152	−21	**5**
4	Skive fH	6	1	0	5	139	144	−5	**2**

Relegation Playoff
Relegation

Pld - Played; W - Won; L - Lost; PF - Points for; PA - Points against; Diff - Difference; Pts - Points.

==== Results (Group 2) ====
In the table below the home teams are listed on the left and the away teams along the top.

	Mors-Thy Håndbold	Ribe-Esbjerg HH	Skive fH	Sydhavsøerne
Mors-Thy Håndbold		26–26	23–18	27–13
Ribe-Esbjerg HH	21–21		28–26	26–24
Skive fH	22–25	23–24		29–21
Sydhavsøerne	24–23	26–26	23–21	

== Topscorers ==
No	Nat.	Name	team	Goals
1.	Denmark	Henrik Møllgaard	Skjern Håndbold	228
2.	Denmark	Bo Spellerberg	KIF Kolding-Kopenhagen	210
3.	Denmark	Rune Ohm	Århus Håndbold	190
4.	Norway	Håvard Tvedten	Aalborg Håndbold	189
5.	Norway	Kristian Kjelling	Bjerringbro-Silkeborg	172

== Coach of the season ==
(Denmark) Morten Henriksen
