= 2021–22 Håndboldligaen =

Season of the Danish Handball League

Håndboldligaen
- Season: 2021–22
- Dates: 10 September 2021 – 12 June 2022
- Champion: GOG; 8th title
- Relegated: TMS Ringsted; Skive fH
- Champions League: GOG; Aalborg Håndbold
- European League: Bjerringbro-Silkeborg; Skjern; Skanderborg Aarhus
- Matches played: 196
- Goals scored: 12,256 (62.53 per match)
- Top goalscorer: Jerry Tollbring (203 goals)
- Total attendance: 427,660
- Average attendance: 1,690

The 2021–22 Håndboldligaen (known as the HTH Herreligaen) was the 86th season of the Danish Handball League, the top men's handball league in Denmark. A total of fourteen teams contested this season's league, which began on 10 September 2021 and concluded on 12 June 2022. Nordsjælland Håndbold was the recently promoted team from the Danish 1st Division.

GOG won their eighth title. TMS Ringsted and Skive fH were relegated.

== Format ==
Under normal circumstances the league is made up of 14 teams. However, for this season only the team had 15 teams. This was because the previous season 2020-21, Aarhus Håndbold had gone bankrupt and was forced to leave the league.

The team TMS Ringsted finished last in the regular season, and should therefore under normal circumstances have been relegated. They decided however to appeal the relegation, and it was found that due to Aarhus Håndbold's bankruptcy, they had the right to remain in the league. Simultaneously, Nordsjælland Håndbold had won the First Division, and Skive fH had won the First Division play-off round and thus had to meet the worst placed team in the Håndboldligaen relegation round. This would be Aarhus Håndbold, as they had not competed, and thus had not gained any points at all. This was however decided after Skive fH had already secured promotion, as Aarhus Håndbold could not compete. This meant that only one team was relegated, but two were promoted. Therefore it was decided that for the 2021–22 Håndboldligaen, the league would have 15, not 14 teams.

In the 15 team league format, it meant that two teams, instead of the usual one team, was relegated directly after the regular season. The regular season also had two rounds more than usual.

== Teams ==
Locations of the 2021–22 Håndboldligaen

=== Arenas and locations ===
The following 15 clubs competed in the Håndboldligaen during the 2021–22 season:

Team	Location	Arena	Capacity
Aalborg Håndbold	Aalborg	Jutlander Bank Arena	5,009
Bjerringbro-Silkeborg	Bjerringbro	Silkeborg-Hallerne	2,845
Fredericia Håndboldklub	Fredericia	Fredericia Idrætscenter	2,225
GOG	Gudme	Gudme-Hallerne	2,265
KIF Kolding	Kolding	Tre-For Arena	5,182
Lemvig-Thyborøn Håndbold	Lemvig	Vestjysk BANK Arena	1,400
Mors-Thy Håndbold	Nykøbing Mors; Thisted	Jyske Bank Mors Arena; Thy Hallen	2,296; 1,284
Nordsjælland Håndbold	Helsinge; Hillerød	Helsinge-Hallen; Royal Stage	1,600; 3,000
Ribe-Esbjerg HH	Esbjerg; Ribe	Blue Water Dokken; Invactor Arena	3,386; 1,976
Skanderborg Aarhus Håndbold	Skanderborg; Aarhus	Fælledhallen; Ceres Arena	1,700; 5,000
Skive fH	Skive	Interfjord Arena	2,100
Skjern Håndbold	Skjern	Skjern Bank Arena	3,264
SønderjyskE	Sønderborg	Broager Sparekasse Skansen	2,200
TTH Holstebro	Holstebro	Idrætscenter Vest	3,250
TMS Ringsted	Ringsted	Ringsted-Hallen	1,600

== Regular season ==
=== League table ===
Pos	Team	Pld	W	D	L	GF	GA	GD	Pts	Qualification or relegation
1	GOG	28	25	2	1	929	794	+135	52	Qualification to Championship round
2	Aalborg Håndbold	28	23	1	4	931	808	+123	47	Qualification to Championship round
3	Skjern Håndbold	28	18	1	9	810	751	+59	37	Qualification to Championship round
4	Skanderborg Aarhus Håndbold	28	17	2	9	800	775	+25	36	Qualification to Championship round
5	Bjerringbro-Silkeborg	28	16	1	11	846	805	+41	33	Qualification to Championship round
6	Fredericia Håndboldklub	28	14	1	13	833	831	+2	29	Qualification to Championship round
7	Mors-Thy Håndbold	28	12	2	14	819	798	+21	26	Qualification to Championship round
8	Ribe-Esbjerg HH	28	12	0	16	798	815	−17	24	Qualification to Championship round
9	Lemvig-Thyborøn Håndbold	28	9	4	15	774	838	−64	22	Qualification to Relegation round
10	Nordsjælland Håndbold	28	8	5	15	769	810	−41	21 (Note: Nordsjælland Håndbold is ahead of SønderjyskE Herrer on head-to-head results: 54–50.)	Qualification to Relegation round
11	SønderjyskE Herrer	28	9	3	16	779	801	−22	21	Qualification to Relegation round
12	KIF Kolding	28	7	5	16	800	856	−56	19 (Note: KIF Kolding is ahead of TTH Holstebro on head-to-head results: 56–56 (a).)	Qualification to Relegation round
13	TTH Holstebro	28	9	1	18	820	858	−38	19	Qualification to Relegation round
14	TMS Ringsted (R)	28	8	3	17	805	872	−67	19	Relegated to 1st Division
15	Skive fH (R)	28	6	3	19	751	842	−91	15	Relegated to 1st Division

Source: Danish Handball Federation (in Danish), Flashscore
Rules for classification: 1) points; 2) head-to-head points; 3) goal difference; 4) goals scored; 5) head-to-head goal difference; 6) head-to-head number of goals scored.
(R) Relegated

== Second round ==
=== Championship round ===
==== Group 1 ====
Pos	Team	Pld	W	D	L	GF	GA	GD	Pts	Qualification
1	GOG	6	5	0	1	175	171	+4	12 (Note: GOG were added two point for in honoration of the Regular season's standings.)	Advance to playoffs
2	Bjerringbro-Silkeborg	6	5	0	1	184	160	+24	10	Advance to playoffs
3	Skanderborg Aarhus Håndbold	6	2	0	4	165	172	−7	5 (Note: Skanderborg Aarhus Håndbold were added one point for in honoration of the Regular season's standings.)	
4	Ribe-Esbjerg HH	6	0	0	6	167	188	−21	0	

Source: Danish Handball Federation (in Danish), Flashscore
Rules for classification: 1) points; 2) head-to-head points; 3) goal difference; 4) goals scored; 5) head-to-head goal difference; 6) head-to-head number of goals scored.

==== Group 2 ====
Pos	Team	Pld	W	D	L	GF	GA	GD	Pts	Qualification
1	Aalborg Håndbold	6	5	0	1	190	176	+14	12 (Note: Aalborg Håndbold were added two point for in honoration of the Regular season's standings.)	Advance to Playoffs
2	Skjern Håndbold	6	4	0	2	181	163	+18	9 (Note: Skjern Håndbold were added one point for in honoration of the Regular season's standings.)	Advance to Playoffs
3	Mors-Thy Håndbold	6	2	0	4	193	193	0	4	
4	Fredericia Håndboldklub	6	1	0	5	165	197	−32	2	

Source: Danish Handball Federation (in Danish), Flashscore
Rules for classification: 1) points; 2) head-to-head points; 3) goal difference; 4) goals scored; 5) head-to-head goal difference; 6) head-to-head number of goals scored.

=== Relegation round ===
Pos	Team	Pld	W	D	L	GF	GA	GD	Pts	Qualification or relegation
9	SønderjyskE Herrer	4	4	0	0	144	118	+26	9 (Note: SønderjyskE Herrer were added one point for in honoration of the Regular season's standings.)	
10	Nordsjælland Håndbold	4	2	1	1	124	121	+3	7 (Note: Nordsjælland Håndbold were added two point for in honoration of the Regular season's standings.)	
11	Lemvig-Thyborøn Håndbold	4	2	0	2	123	127	−4	6 (Note: Lemvig-Thyborøn Håndbold were added two point for in honoration of the Regular season's standings.)	
12	KIF Kolding	4	0	2	2	122	127	−5	3 (Note: KIF Kolding were added one point for in honoration of the Regular season's standings.)	
13	TTH Holstebro (O)	4	0	1	3	121	141	−20	1	Qualification for Relegation play-offs

Source: Danish Handball Federation (in Danish), Flashscore
Rules for classification: 1) points; 2) head-to-head points; 3) goal difference; 4) goals scored; 5) head-to-head goal difference; 6) head-to-head number of goals scored.
(O) Play-off winners

== Playoffs ==
=== Semifinals ===
Semifinals were played best-of-three format.

Team 1	Series	Team 2	Game 1	Game 2	Game 3
GOG	2–1	Skjern Håndbold	33–23	27–30	34–29
Aalborg Håndbold	2–0	Bjerringbro-Silkeborg	24–22	26–31	–

=== Finals ===
Team 1	Agg.	Team 2	1st leg	2nd leg
GOG	52–51	Aalborg Håndbold	25–25	27–26

==== Game 1 ====
8 June 2022; 20:30	GOG	25–25	Aalborg Håndbold	Phønix Tag Arena, Gudme; Attendance: 1,952; Referees: Pedersen, Nygaard
8 June 2022; 20:30	Tollbring 6	(14–11)	Pálmarsson, Claar 4	Phønix Tag Arena, Gudme; Attendance: 1,952; Referees: Pedersen, Nygaard
8 June 2022; 20:30	1× (yellow card) 4× (suspension)	Report	1× (yellow card) 3× (suspension)	Phønix Tag Arena, Gudme; Attendance: 1,952; Referees: Pedersen, Nygaard

==== Game 2 ====
12 June 2021; 17:00	Aalborg Håndbold	26–27	GOG	Gigantium, Aalborg; Attendance: 5,020; Referees: Madsen, Hansen
12 June 2021; 17:00	three players 5	(16–13)	Tollbring 8	Gigantium, Aalborg; Attendance: 5,020; Referees: Madsen, Hansen
12 June 2021; 17:00	4× (suspension)	Report	1× (yellow card) 3× (suspension)	Gigantium, Aalborg; Attendance: 5,020; Referees: Madsen, Hansen

GOG won the Finals 52–51 on aggregate.

=== Third place series ===
Team 1	Agg.	Team 2	1st leg	2nd leg
Skjern Håndbold	59–64	Bjerringbro-Silkeborg	28–30	31–34

== Promotion/relegation play-offs ==
The 13th-placed teams of the Håndboldligaen faces the 2nd and 3rd-placed team of the 1st Division. The Promotion/relegation play-offs were played best-of-three format. The winner of these tournament was promoted to Håndboldligaen and the other teams relegated to 1st Division.

Semifinals
I/13	TTH Holstebro	w/o
II/2	HØJ Elite	2
II/3	Grindsted GIF Håndbold	1

Finals
I/13	TTH Holstebro	2
II/2	HØJ Elite	0

== Final standings ==
Pos	Team	Pld	W	D	L	Qualification or relegation
1	GOG (C)	39	33	3	3	Qualification for Champions League group phase
2	Aalborg Håndbold	38	30	2	6	Qualification for Champions League group phase
3	Bjerringbro-Silkeborg	38	23	1	14	Qualification for European League first qualifying round
4	Skjern Håndbold	39	23	1	15	Qualification for European League group phase
5	Skanderborg Aarhus Håndbold	34	19	2	13	Qualification for European League second qualifying round
6	Mors-Thy Håndbold	34	14	2	18	
7	Fredericia Håndboldklub	34	15	1	18	
8	Ribe-Esbjerg HH	34	12	0	22	
9	SønderjyskE Herrer	32	13	3	16	
10	Nordsjælland Håndbold	32	10	6	16	
11	Lemvig-Thyborøn Håndbold	32	11	4	17	
12	KIF Kolding	32	7	7	18	
13	TTH Holstebro (O)	34	11	2	21	
14	TMS Ringsted (R)	28	8	3	17	Relegated to 1st Division
15	Skive fH (R)	28	6	3	19	Relegated to 1st Division

Source: Danish Handball Federation - HTH Herreligaen 2021/22
(C) Champions; (O) Play-off winners; (R) Relegated

== Statistics ==
=== Top goalscorers ===
Rank	Player	Club	Goals
1	(Sweden) Jerry Tollbring	GOG	203
2	(Denmark) Bjarke Christensen	Mors-Thy Håndbold	174
3	(Denmark) Martin Risom	TMS Ringsted	167
4	(Denmark) Lasse Mikkelsen	Skjern Håndbold	146
5	(Norway) Erik Thorsteinsen Toft	Mors-Thy Håndbold	136
6	(Denmark) Magnus Bramming	TTH Holstebro	136
7	(Sweden) Lukas Sandell	Aalborg Håndbold	136
8	(Denmark) Peter Balling	KIF Kolding	135
9	(Denmark) Jacob Lassen	Bjerringbro-Silkeborg	132
10	(Sweden) William Bogojevic	Bjerringbro-Silkeborg	132

=== All-Star team ===
The all-star team was announced on 1 June 2022.

Position	Player	Club
Goalkeeper	(Denmark) Christoffer Bonde	Skjern Håndbold
Left wing	(Sweden) Jerry Tollbring	GOG
Left back	(Denmark) Simon Pytlick	GOG
Centre back	(Sweden) Felix Claar	Aalborg Håndbold
Pivot	(Sweden) Oscar Bergendahl	GOG
Right back	(Denmark) Jacob Lassen	Bjerringbro-Silkeborg
Right wing	(Denmark) Oskar Vind Rasmussen	TMS Ringsted

=== Coach of the season ===
(Denmark) Nick Rasmussen

== See also ==
- 2021 Danish Cup
- 2021–22 1st Division
