= 2019–20 Håndboldligaen =

Håndboldligaen
- Season: 2019-20
- Champions: Aalborg Håndbold
- Relegated: Nordsjælland Håndbold
- Champions League: Aalborg Håndbold
- Matches: 182
- Goals: 9,427 (51.8 per match)
- Top goalscorer: (Denmark) Nikolaj Læsø (154 goals)
- Biggest home win: SØN 36–23 KIF; TTH 31–18 SKA
- Biggest away win: MTH 22–37 SKA
- Highest scoring: GOG 39–36 FHK
- Total attendance: 279,557
- Average attendance: 1,664

The 2019–20 Håndboldligaen, is the 84th season of the Håndboldligaen, Denmark's premier Handball league. Fredericia HK was promoted from the 1st Division the previous season. The season was stopped on 7th April 2021 due to the COVID-19 pandemic. Remaining regular season as well as play-offs were cancelled.Aalborg Håndbold was declared winner of the 2019-2020 Håndboldligaen. Nordsjælland Håndbold were relegated, as they came in last place in the table.

== Team information ==
Locations of the 2019–20 Håndboldligaen

The following 14 clubs compete in the Håndboldligaen during the 2019–20 season:

Team	Location	Arena	Capacity
Aalborg Håndbold	Aalborg	Jutlander Bank Arena	5,009
Aarhus Håndbold	Aarhus	Ceres Arena	5,001
Bjerringbro-Silkeborg Håndbold	Bjerringbro	Jysk Arena	2,845
Fredericia HK	Fredericia	Fredericia Idrætscenter	2,225
GOG	Gudme	SU`VI:T Arena	2,265
KIF Kolding	Kolding	Kolding Hallen	5,182
Lemvig-Thyborøn Håndbold	Lemvig	Arena Vestjylland Forsikring	1,400
Mors-Thy	Nykøbing Mors Thisted	Jyske Bank Mors Arena Thy Hallen	2,296 1,284
Nordsjælland Håndbold	Helsinge; Hillerød	Helsinge-Hallen; FrederiksborgCentret	1,600; 1,100
Ribe-Esbjerg	Esbjerg Ribe	Blue Water Dokken Invactor Arena	3,386 1,976
Skanderborg	Skanderborg	Fælledhallen	2,000
Skjern	Skjern	Skjern Bank Arena	3,264
SønderjyskE	Sønderborg	Skansen	2,200
TTH Holstebro	Holstebro	Idrætscenter Vest	3,250

=== Personnel and kits ===
Following is the list of clubs competing in 2019–20 Håndboldligaen, with their manager, kit manufacturer and shirt sponsor.

Team	President	Head coach	Kit manufacturer	Shirt sponsor
Aalborg Håndbold	Jan Larsen	(Denmark) Stefan Madsen	hummel	Jutlander Bank
Aarhus Håndbold	Henrik Lundorff	(Denmark) Erik Veje Rasmussen	hummel	Sparkassen Kronjylland, Jytas
Bjerringbro-Silkeborg Håndbold	Frank Lajer	(Denmark) Peter Bredsdorff-Larsen	adidas	Jyske Bank, Grundfos
Fredericia HK	Bent Jensen	(Denmark) Jesper Houmark	adidas	thansen
GOG	Kasper Jørgensen	(Denmark) Nicolej Krickau	Select	Fynske Bank, EnergiFyn
KIF Kolding	Jens Boesen	(Denmark) Lars Frederiksen	H2O Sportswear	Jolly Cola, EWII
Mors-Thy Håndbold	Johannes Søndergaard	(Denmark) Søren Hansen	hummel	Jyske Bank
Nordsjælland Håndbold	Jørgen Simonsen	(Denmark) Ian Marko Fog	hummel	GF Forsikring
Ribe-Esbjerg	Holger Refslund	(Denmark) Jan Leslie	hummel	fros
Skanderborg Håndbold	Jens Christensen	(Denmark) Nick Rasmussen	Puma	AVR, Skanderborg kommune
Skjern Håndbold	Henning Kjærgaard	(Iceland) Patrekur Jóhannesson	Puma	Skjern Bank
SønderjyskE	Klaus B. Rasmussen	(Denmark) Kasper Christensen	Diadora	SeaDane Travel
TTH Holstebro	Jørgen S. Hansen	(Finland) Patrick Westerholm	hummel	Vestjysk Bank
Lemvig-Thyborøn Håndbold	Tommy Bomholt Gay	(Denmark) Claus Uhrenholt	hummel	Vestjyske Bank

== Regular season ==
=== Standings ===
Pos	Team	Pld	W	D	L	GF	GA	GD	Pts	Qualification or relegation
1	Aalborg Håndbold (W)	24	19	4	1	706	637	+69	42	Winner + Advance to Champions League
2	GOG Håndbold	24	17	0	7	730	686	+44	34	
3	TTH Holstebro	24	14	5	5	708	624	+84	33	
4	Bjerringbro-Silkeborg Håndbold	24	13	3	8	717	672	+45	29	
5	Skjern Håndbold	24	13	2	9	685	653	+32	28	
6	Skanderborg Håndbold	24	12	3	9	680	671	+9	27	
7	Ribe-Esbjerg HH	24	10	4	10	649	649	0	24	
8	Mors-Thy Håndbold	24	12	0	12	653	659	−6	24	
9	SønderjyskE Herrer	24	10	2	12	656	659	−3	22	
10	Århus Håndbold	24	11	0	13	676	674	+2	22	
11	Fredericia HK	24	6	4	14	686	736	−50	16	
12	KIF Kolding København	24	5	3	16	653	730	−77	13	
13	Lemvig-Thyborøn Håndbold	24	4	5	15	610	656	−46	13	
14	Nordsjælland Håndbold (R)	24	4	1	19	618	721	−103	9	Relegated

Updated to match(es) played on 7 April 2020. Source:
Rules for classification: 1) points; 2) Goal difference; 3) Goals scored.
(R) Relegated; (W) ?

! There's a new relegation playoff made in November 2014

=== Schedule and results ===
Home \ Away	AAL	AAR	BSH	FHK	GOG	KIF	MTH	NSH	REH	SKA	SKJ	SØN	TTH	LTH
Aalborg Håndbold		28–26	32–26	29–24	32–26		27–25	34–25	30–27	26–26	28–28	28–23	23–21	28–27
Århus Håndbold	28–31			30–22	20–27	35–30	24–26	30–25	27–23	35–25	29–33	25–28	25–29	25–26
Bjerringbro-Silkeborg Håndbold		29–32		33–29	32–29	26–31	30–21	31–21	26–27	31–25	26–27	32–21	29–29	31–30
Fredericia HK	31–33	31–29	32–36		33–25	26–25	22–26	33–26	29–29	33–28	29–33	35–38	28–38	
GOG Håndbold	30–34	33–30	32–29	39–36		36–33	26–25	34–21	36–28	29–27	28–27	24–30		30–27
KIF Kolding	29–32	23–27	27–27	26–34	25–28		27–38		28–26	24–31	28–31	24–33	22–25	23–23
Mors-Thy Håndbold	33–30	38–26	20–32	34–29	23–29	28–32		33–28	22–23	22–37	28–28		34–26	29–27
Nordsjælland Håndbold	25–32	27–28	30–34	25–25		29–30	24–30		29–24	29–30	25–31	23–29	22–36	24–23
Ribe-Esbjerg HH	30–31	27–30	30–26	28–28	25–29	26–26	27–22	32–24			21–24	30–24	30–26	27–25
Skanderborg Håndbold	30–30	24–33	25–36	37–25	29–33	35–29	27–19	29–24	30–27			30–26	29–26	24–19
Skjern Håndbold	28–30		25–28	29–25	36–32	31–26	24–27	29–26	27–29	29–24		30–25	33–36	34–27
SønderjyskE Herrer	22–29	35–25	28–30	30–22	25–33	36–23	26–24	26–28		27–32	27–25		25–25	18–26
TTH Holstebro	25–27	35–31	26–26		33–23	38–30	31–26	33–23	27–27	31–18	22–22	29–27		27–21
Lemvig-Thyborøn Håndbold	22–22	19–26	35–31	25–25	26–34	29–32		25–27	23–26	28–28	27–24	27–27	23–34	

Legend: Blue = home team win; Yellow = draw; Red = away team win.

No. 1-8 from the regular season divided into two groups with the top two will advance to the semifinals

== Top goalscorers ==
As of matches played on 30 June 2020

=== Regular season ===
Rank	Player	Club	Goals
1	(Denmark) Nikolaj Læsø	Århus Håndbold	154
2	(Denmark) Lasse Møller	GOG Håndbold	150
3	(Denmark) Jóhan Hansen	Bjerringbro-Silkeborg Håndbold	138
4	(Denmark) Kasper Kisum	Nordsjælland Håndbold	135
5	(Denmark) Emil Jakobsen	GOG Håndbold	133
6	(Denmark) Magnus Bramming	TTH Holstebro	130
7	(Denmark) Kristian Stoklund	Fredericia HK	125
8	(Sweden) Andreas Flodman	KIF Kolding	121
9	(Denmark) Johan Meklenborg	TTH Holstebro	120
10	(Denmark) Cornelius Kragh Astrup	Skanderhånd Håndbold	114

=== Overall season ===
Rank	Player	Club	Goals
1	(Denmark) Nikolaj Læsø	Århus Håndbold	154
2	(Denmark) Lasse Møller	GOG Håndbold	150
3	(Denmark) Jóhan Hansen	Bjerringbro-Silkeborg Håndbold	138
4	(Denmark) Kasper Kisum	Nordsjælland Håndbold	135
5	(Denmark) Emil Jakobsen	GOG Håndbold	133
6	(Denmark) Magnus Bramming	TTH Holstebro	130
7	(Denmark) Kristian Stoklund	Fredericia HK	125
8	(Sweden) Andreas Flodman	KIF Kolding	121
9	(Denmark) Johan Meklenborg	TTH Holstebro	120
10	(Denmark) Cornelius Kragh Aastrup	Skanderborg Håndbold	114

== Coach of the season ==
(Sweden) Stefan Madsen - Aalborg Håndbold

== Number of teams by regions ==
	Region	No. teams	Teams
1	Midtjylland	5	Aarhus Håndbold, Bjerringbro-Silkeborg Håndbold, Skanderborg Håndbold, Skjern Håndbold, TTH Holstebro
2	Syddanmark	5	KIF Kolding København, GOG, Ribe-Esbjerg HH, SønderjyskE, Fredericia HK
3	Nordjylland	2	Aalborg Håndbold, Mors-Thy Håndbold
4	Hovedstaden	1	Nordsjælland Håndbold
