= 2025–26 Håndboldligaen =

Season of the Danish Handball League

Håndboldligaen
- Season: 2025–26
- Champion: Aalborg Håndbold
- Relegated: GGIF, HØJ
- Champions League: Aalborg Håndbold, Skanderborg AGF
- European League: Mors-Thy, TTH
- Matches played: 182
- Goals scored: 14,053 (77.21 per match)
- Top goalscorer: Frederik Bjerre (283)
- Longest winning run: Aalborg Håndbold (24)
- Longest unbeaten run: Aalborg Håndbold (24)
- Longest winless run: GGIF (25)
- Total attendance: 443,358

The 2025–26 Håndboldligaen was the 90th season of the Danish Handball League, the top men's handball league in Denmark. A total of fourteen teams contested this season's league. HØJ Elite were promoted from the 1st Division, for the first time in club history.

Aalborg Håndbold won the regular season. GGIF Grindsted were relegated, as they finished last in the regular season. HØJ Elite were later relegated when they lost the play-off to KIF Kolding.

== Teams ==
Locations of the 2025–26 Håndboldligaen

=== Arenas and locations ===
The following 14 clubs competed in the Håndboldligaen during the 2025–26 season:

Team	City	Arena	Capacity
Aalborg Håndbold	Aalborg	Sparekassen Danmark Arena	5.000
Bjerringbro-Silkeborg Håndbold	Silkeborg	Jysk Arena	3.900
Fredericia HK	Fredericia	thansen Arena	2.700
GOG Håndbold	Gudme	Phønix Tag Arena	2.645
TMS Ringsted	Ringsted	Ringsted-Hallen	1.600
HØJ Elite	Ølstykke; Jyllinge	Ølstykke-Hallen	500
Grindsted GIF Håndbold	Grindsted	Lynghallen	700
Mors-Thy Håndbold	Nykøbing Mors; Thisted	Sparekassen Thy Arena Mors; Thyhallen	1.500; 1.336
Nordsjælland Håndbold	Helsinge; Helsingør; Hillerød	Helsinge Hallerne; Helsingørhallen; Royal Stage Hillerød	1.500; 2.400; 3.040
Ribe-Esbjerg	Esbjerg; Ribe	Blue Water Dokken; Ribe Fritidscenter	3.570; 2.000
Skanderborg Aarhus Håndbold	Aarhus; Skanderborg	Ceres Arena; Fælledhallen	4.700; 1.790
Skjern Håndbold	Skjern	Skjern Bank Arena	2.400
SønderjyskE	Sønderborg	Broager Sparekasse Skansen	2.200
TTH Holstebro	Holstebro	Gråkjær Arena	3.250

== Regular season ==
=== League table ===
Pos	Team	Pld	W	D	L	GF	GA	GD	Pts	Qualification or relegation
1	Aalborg Håndbold	26	25	0	1	917	726	+191	50	Championship Play-Off
2	Skanderborg Aarhus Håndbold	26	15	5	6	831	778	+53	35	Championship Play-Off
3	GOG	26	15	4	7	851	789	+62	34	Championship Play-Off
4	Team Tvis Holstebro	26	11	7	8	821	813	+8	29	Championship Play-Off
5	Skjern Håndbold	26	12	5	9	764	738	+26	29	Championship Play-Off
6	Mors-Thy Håndbold	26	13	3	10	815	818	−3	29	Championship Play-Off
7	Bjerringbro-Silkeborg	26	11	5	10	805	795	+10	27	Championship Play-Off
8	Fredericia HK	26	11	2	13	805	825	−20	24	Championship Play-Off
9	Ribe-Esbjerg HH	26	9	4	13	788	816	−28	22	
10	Nordsjælland Håndbold	26	10	1	15	783	805	−22	21	
11	TMS Ringsted	26	8	4	14	748	817	−69	20	
12	SønderjyskE	26	7	6	13	825	854	−29	20	
13	HØJ Elite	26	8	2	16	753	805	−52	18	
14	Grindsted GIF Håndbold	26	1	4	21	720	847	−127	6	Relegated

Rules for classification: 1) points; 2) Goal difference; 3) Goals scored.

== Second round ==
=== Championship round ===
==== Group 1 ====
Pos	Team	Pld	W	D	L	GF	GA	GD	Pts	Qualification
1	Aalborg Håndbold	6	5	0	1	209	187	+22	12 (Note: Aalborg Håndbold were added two points for in honoration of the Regular season's standings.)	Advance to playoffs
2	GOG	6	3	0	3	189	187	+2	7 (Note: GOG were added one point for in honoration of the Regular season's standings.)	Advance to playoffs
3	Skjern Håndbold	6	2	0	4	186	200	−14	4	
4	Fredericia HK	6	2	0	4	185	195	−10	4	

Updated to match(es) played on 3 May 2026. Source: Dansk Håndbold
Rules for classification: 1) points; 2) head-to-head points; 3) goal difference; 4) goals scored; 5) head-to-head goal difference; 6) head-to-head number of goals scored.

==== Group 2 ====
Pos	Team	Pld	W	D	L	GF	GA	GD	Pts	Qualification
1	Skanderborg Aarhus Håndbold	6	3	1	2	201	191	+10	9 (Note: Skanderborg Aarhus Håndbold were added two points for in honoration of the Regular season's standings.)	Advance to Playoffs
2	Mors-Thy Håndbold	6	4	1	1	200	189	+11	9	Advance to Playoffs
3	Team Tvis Holstebro	6	3	0	3	193	195	−2	7 (Note: Team Tvis Holstebro were added one point for in honoration of the Regular season's standings.)	
4	Bjerringbro-Silkeborg	6	1	0	5	187	206	−19	2	

Updated to match(es) played on 2 May 2026. Source: Dansk Håndbold
Rules for classification: 1) points; 2) head-to-head points; 3) goal difference; 4) goals scored; 5) head-to-head goal difference; 6) head-to-head number of goals scored.

=== Relegation round ===
==== Group stage ====
Pos	Team	Pld	W	D	L	GF	GA	GD	Pts	Qualification or relegation
9	Ribe-Esbjerg HH	4	3	0	1	133	128	+5	8 (Note: Ribe-Esbjerg HH were added two points for in honoration of the Regular season's standings.)	
10	SønderjyskE Håndbold	4	1	2	1	135	127	+8	5 (Note: SønderjyskE Håndbold were added one point for in honoration of the Regular season's standings.)	
11	TMS Ringsted	4	2	0	2	113	122	−9	5 (Note: TMS Ringsted were added one point for in honoration of the Regular season's standings.)	
12	Nordsjælland Håndbold	4	1	1	2	119	129	−10	5 (Note: Nordsjælland Håndbold were added two points for in honoration of the Regular season's standings.)	
13	HØJ Elite	4	1	1	2	130	124	+6	3	Relegation play-offs

Updated to match(es) played on 2 May 2026. Source: tophåndbold.dk
Rules for classification: 1) points; 2) head-to-head points; 3) goal difference; 4) goals scored; 5) head-to-head goal difference; 6) head-to-head number of goals scored.

== Playoffs ==
=== Promotion/relegation play-offs ===
The second and third placed team in the 1st Division meet in a play off, where the winner meet the loser from the liga relegation round. The Winner is playing in the 2026–27 Håndboldligaen and the loser in the 2026–27 1st Division.

Date			Home team in 1st and 3rd match	Home team in 2nd match	Result			
1. match	2. match	3. match	Home team in 1st and 3rd match	Home team in 2nd match	Agg.	1. match	2. match	3. match
03.05	06.05	10.05	HØJ Elite	KIF Kolding	87-89	30–21	29-33	30-33

! Best of three matches. In the case of a tie after the second match, a third match is played. Highest ranking team in the regular season has the home advantage in the first and possible third match.

=== Championship semifinals ===
Semifinals were played best-of-three format. Highest ranking team in the regular season plays at home in the second match.

Date			Home team in 1st match and 3rd match	Home team in 2nd match	Result			
1. match	2. match	3. match	Home team in 1st match and 3rd match	Home team in 2nd match	Agg.	1. match	2. match	3. match
20.05	23.05		GOG	Skanderborg Aarhus Håndbold	71-61	38-35	26-33	
20.05	23.05		Aalborg Håndbold	Mors-Thy Håndbold	77-56	40-21	35-37	

! Best of three matches. In the case of a tie after the second match, a third match is played. Highest ranking team in the regular season has the home advantage in the first and possible third match.

=== Third place match ===
The third place games are played best-of-three format.

Date			Home team in 1st match and 3rd match	Home team in 2nd match	Result			
1. match	2. match	3. match	Home team in 1st match and 3rd match	Home team in 2nd match	Agg.	1. match	2. match	3. match
31.05	04.06		GOG	Mors-Thy Håndbold	73-60	38-31	35-29	

! Best of three matches. In the case of a tie after the second match, a third match is played. Highest ranking team in the regular season has the home advantage in the first and possible third match.

=== Championship match ===
The Championship games are played best-of-three format.

Date			Home team in 1st match and 3rd match	Home team in 2nd match	Result			
1. match	2. match	3. match	Home team in 1st match and 3rd match	Home team in 2nd match	Agg.	1. match	2. match	3. match
31.05	04.06		Aalborg Håndbold	Skanderborg Aarhus Håndbold	65-60	30-29	35-31	

Best of three matches. In the case of a tie after the second match, a third match is played. Highest ranking team in the regular season has the home advantage in the first and possible third match.

== Statistics ==
=== Top goalscorers ===
==== Regular season ====
Rank	Name	Club	Goals
1	(Denmark) Frederik Bjerre	GOG	225
2	(Denmark) Victor Norlyk	Mors-Thy	221
3	(Denmark) Frederik Tilsted	Sønderjyske	187
4	(Denmark) Mads Svane	Bjerringbro-Silkeborg	167
5	(Denmark) Magnus Storgaard	TTH Holstebro	155
6	(Denmark) Rasmus Graffe	TMS Ringsted	148
7	(Denmark) Hjalte Lykke	GOG	147
8	(Denmark) Jon Lindenchrone	Skjern	143
9	(Denmark) Mads Kjeldgaard Andersen	Fredericia HK	140
10	(Denmark) Oliver Wosniak	TMS Ringsted	136

=== Full season ===
Rank	Name	Club	Goals
1	(Denmark) Frederik Bjerre	GOG Håndbold	283
2	(Denmark) Victor Norlyk	Mors-Thy Håndbold	278
3	(Denmark) Mads Svane	Bjerringbro-Silkeborg Håndbold	215
3	(Denmark) Frederik Tilsted	Sønderjyske	215
5	(Denmark) Hjalte Lykke	GOG Håndbold	196
6	(Denmark) Emil Lærke	Skanderborg AGF	193
7	(Denmark) Nichlas Hald	Mors-Thy Håndbold	189
8	(Denmark) Jon Lindenchrone	Skjern Håndbold	180
8	(Denmark) Magnus Storgaard Pedersen	TTH Holstebro	180
8	(Denmark) Jóhan á Plógv Hansen	Skanderborg AGF	133

=== All Star team ===
The all-star team was announced on 24 May 2026.

Position	Player	Club
Goalkeeper	(Denmark) Niklas Landin	Aalborg Håndbold
Left wing	(Denmark) Frederik Bjerre	GOG Håndbold
Left back	(Denmark) Thomas Arnoldsen	Aalborg Håndbold
Centre back	(Denmark) Victor Norlyk	Mors-Thy Håndbold
Pivot	(Denmark) Andreas Søgaard	Skanderborg AGF
Right back	(Denmark) Mads Hoxer	Aalborg Håndbold
Right wing	(Denmark) Jóhan Hansen	Skanderborg AGF

== Coach of the year ==
- (Denmark) Nick Rasmussen - Skanderborg AGF

== See also ==
- 2025 Danish Cup
