= 2012–13 Håndboldligaen (men's handball) =

Håndboldligaen
- Season: 2012–13
- Dates: 5 September 2012 - 26 May 2014
- Champions: Aalborg Håndbold (2nd title)
- Relegated: Viborg HK (Withdrew)
- Champions League: Aalborg Håndbold, KIF Kolding
- EHF Cup: Skjern Håndbold, Mors-Thy Håndbold
- Matches: 218
- Goals: 12,030 (55.18 per match)
- Top goalscorer: (Denmark) Jeppe Riber (196 goals)

The 2012–13 Håndboldligaen was the 77th season of the Håndboldligaen, Denmark's premier Handball league.

Aalborg Håndbold won the championship, when they beat KIF Kolding København in the final. Nordsjælland Håndbold should have been relegated, when they finished last in the regular season, but due to Viborg HK pulling their men's team, they could stay in the league.

The previous season's champions, AG København, had gone bankrupt and had fused with KIF Kolding, making KIF Kolding København.

== Team information ==
Locations of the 2012–13 Håndboldligaen

The following 14 clubs compete in the Håndboldligaen during the 2012–13 season:

Team	Location	Arena	Capacity
AaB Håndbold	Aalborg	Gigantium	4,500
Aarhus GF	Aarhus	NRGi Arena	4,700
Bjerringbro-Silkeborg	Bjerringbro	Silkeborg-Hallerne	3,900
Viborg HK	Viborg	Viborg Stadionhal	2,865
KIF Kolding København	Kolding	Kolding Hallen	2,650
Mors-Thy	Nykøbing Mors	Jyske Bank Mors Arena	1,500
Nordsjælland	Helsinge	Helsinge-Hallen	1,600
Ribe-Esbjerg	Ribe	Ribe Fritidscenter	2,200
Skanderborg	Skanderborg	Morten Børup Hallen	
Skjern	Skjern	Skjern Bank Arena	2,400
Skive fH	Skive	Skivehallerne	
SønderjyskE	Sønderborg	Broager Sparekasse Skansen	2,200
Team Tvis Holstebro	Holstebro	Idrætscenter Vest	3,250
TMS Ringsted	Ringsted	Ringsted-Hallen	1,600

== Regular season ==
=== Standings ===
	Team	Pld	W	D	L	GF	GA	Diff	Pts
1	KIF Kolding København	26	23	1	2	740	605	+135	47
2	Skjern Håndbold	26	20	2	4	771	647	+124	42
3	Bjerringbro-Silkeborg	26	20	1	5	723	635	+88	41
4	Aalborg Håndbold	26	18	1	7	699	617	+82	37
5	Team Tvis Holstebro	26	17	1	8	709	652	+57	35
6	AGF	26	13	0	13	668	680	-12	26
7	Mors-Thy Håndbold	26	11	2	13	685	713	-28	24
8	SønderjyskE	26	11	1	13	740	765	-25	23
9	Ribe-Esbjerg HH	26	9	2	15	708	765	−57	23
10	Viborg HK	26	8	3	15	647	693	−46	19
11	Skanderborg Håndbold	26	7	3	16	681	721	−40	17
12	TMS Ringsted	26	5	3	18	681	746	−65	11
13	Skive fH	26	3	4	19	604	697	−93	10
14	Nordsjælland Håndbold	26	3	4	19	645	756	−111	10

Championship Round
Relegation Round
Relegation

Pld - Played; W - Won; L - Lost; PF - Points for; PA - Points against; Diff - Difference; Pts - Points. Source:

== Championship Round ==
=== Group 1 ===
	Team	Pld	W	D	L	GF	GA	Diff	Pts
1	Aalborg Håndbold	6	5	1	0	182	142	+40	12
2	KIF Kolding København	6	4	1	1	161	136	+25	11
3	SønderjyskE	6	1	0	5	171	196	−25	2
4	Team Tvis Holstebro	6	1	0	5	141	181	−40	2

Championship Playoff

Pld - Played; W - Won; L - Lost; PF - Points for; PA - Points against; Diff - Difference; Pts - Points.

=== Group 2 ===
	Team	Pld	W	D	L	GF	GA	Diff	Pts
1	Skjern Håndbold	6	5	0	1	167	160	+7	12
2	Mors-Thy Håndbold	6	4	0	2	160	154	+6	8
3	AGF	6	2	0	4	152	157	-5	6
4	BSV	6	1	0	5	149	157	−8	3

Championship Playoff

Pld - Played; W - Won; L - Lost; PF - Points for; PA - Points against; Diff - Difference; Pts - Points.

== Championship Playoffs ==
Teams in bold won the playoff series. Numbers to the left of each team indicate the team's original playoff seeding. Numbers to the right indicate the score of each playoff game.

Semifinals
Mors-Thy Håndbold	25	26	**51**
**Aalborg Håndbold**	23	29	**52**
**KIF Kolding København**	25	20	**45**
Skjern Håndbold	22	21	**43**

Finals
**Aalborg Håndbold**	29	29	**58**
Skjern Håndbold	21	26	**47**

== Relegation Round ==
=== Group 1 ===
	Team	Pld	W	D	L	GF	GA	Diff	Pts
1	Ribe-Esbjerg	6	4	0	2	168	165	+3	**10**
2	Skanderborg Håndbold	6	4	0	2	170	149	+21	**9**
3	Lemvig-Thyborøn	6	3	0	3	165	149	−4	**6**
4	Ajax København	6	1	0	5	160	180	−20	**2**

Relegation Playoff
Relegation

Pld - Played; W - Won; L - Lost; PF - Points for; PA - Points against; Diff - Difference; Pts - Points.

=== Group 2 ===
	Team	Pld	W	D	L	GF	GA	Diff	Pts
1	Viborg HK	6	4	0	2	157	148	+9	**10**
2	TMS Ringsted	6	4	0	2	158	151	+7	**9**
3	Skive fH	6	3	0	3	150	156	−6	**6**
4	Team Sydhavsøerne	6	1	0	5	153	163	−10	**2**

Relegation Playoff
Relegation

Pld - Played; W - Won; L - Lost; PF - Points for; PA - Points against; Diff - Difference; Pts - Points.

=== Relegation playoff ===
Home team in 1st match	Home team in 2nd match	Result		
Home team in 1st match	Home team in 2nd match	Agg.	1st match	2nd match
**Skive fH**	Skanderborg Håndbold	**61-55**	31-27	30-28

== Statistics ==
=== Topscorers ===
==== Regular season ====
No.	Nat.	Name	Team	Goals
1.	Denmark	Jeppe Riber	Ribe-Esbjerg HH	164
2.	Denmark	Rune Ohm	SønderjyskE Håndbold	150
3.	Denmark	Mikkel Sjøberg	TMS Ringsted	136
4.	Denmark	Henrik Møllgaard	Skjern Håndbold	133
5.	Denmark	Peter Balling	Skanderborg Håndbold	132
6.	Denmark	Patrick Wiesmach	Team Tvis Holstebro	126
6.	Denmark	Jonas Langerhuus	Ribe-Esbjerg HH	126
6.	Sweden	Kim Andersson	KIF Kolding København	126
6.	Denmark	Morten Balling	Mors-Thy Håndbold	126
10.	Denmark	Ronnie Mathiasen	Ribe-Esbjerg HH	125
Updated: 21 March 2013
