= SønderjyskE Herrehåndbold =

Danish men's handball team

SønderjyskE
- Full name: Sønderjysk Elitesport Herrehåndbold
- Short name: SE, SønderjyskE
- Founded: 2004; 22 years ago
- Arena: Sydjysk Sparekasse Skansen
- Capacity: 2,200
- President: Klaus B. Rasmussen
- Head coach: Rasmus Glad Vandbæk
- League: Herrehåndboldligaen
- 2025-26: 12th
Home	Away

SønderjyskE Herrehåndbold is a Danish men's handball club based in Sønderborg. They currently compete in the Danish Handball League and Danish Handball Cup.

They are part of the general sports club SønderjyskE, which also has a soccer and ice hockey team.

== History ==
SønderjyskE was created as a club for the whole region of South Jutland as it became obvious, that it was impossible to create elite teams able to compete in the top leagues on the basis of city teams, which was the former approach. The men's football team used to be solely based in the city of Haderslev under the name Haderslev FK. In 2004 all the elite teams in football, ice hockey and handball merged into SønderjyskE, enabling the clubs to represent not only a city but the whole region of South Jutland (Sønderjylland), which drew more attention to the teams from sponsors, fans and media and made it easier to keep talents in South Jutland.

In their first season, 2004-05 they were promoted from the 2nd Division to the 1st Division. In 2006 TM Tønder Håndbold withdrew from the project, when the team moved their home matches to Sønderborg, because they believed the team had come too far from their roots in Tønder. This meant that the team had to continue in the 3rd Division, the 4th tier, as they had been playing on TM Tønder's license. In the same season they were promoted after winning the 3rd Division. The following season they were promoted to the 1st Division again.

In the 2010-11 season they were promoted to the top division after two years in the 1st Division. In their first season in the top division, they finished 12th out of 14 and thus avoided relegation. In the 2012-13 season, they reached the Championship playoff of the Danish league for the first time.

From 1 July 2024, SønderjyskE Herrehåndbold became independent from SønderjyskE Elitesport to be owned by local businesses in Sønderborg. They will continue to use the same logo and colored kit.

== Team ==
=== Staff ===
Pos.	Name
Head coach	(Denmark) Kasper Søndergaard
Assistant coach	(Denmark) Lasse Folkman
Team Leader	(Denmark) Sonny Johansen
Team Leader	(Denmark) Poul Hansen
Team Leader	(Denmark) Mona Blank
Physiotherapist	(Denmark) Finn Zachariassen

=== Current squad ===
Squad for the 2025-26 season

Goalkeeper

- 1 (Netherlands) Matthias Rex Dorgelo
- 30 (Denmark) Julius Sten

Wingers
LW

- 5 (Denmark) Viktor Bergholt
- 43 (Denmark) Emil La Cour

RW

- 33 (Norway) Ebbe Stankiewicz

Pivots

- 2 (Denmark) Tobias Gregers Schmidt
- 14 (Denmark) Jacob Bagersted
- 18 (Denmark) Morten Bjørnshauge

Back players
LB

- 9 (Denmark) Nicolai Skytte
- 28 (Denmark) Frederik Tilsted

CB

- 6 (Sweden) Jesper Konradsson
- 29 (Norway) Magnus Fredriksen

RB

- 24 (Denmark) Sebastian Augustinussen
- 48 (Norway) Gabriel Setterblom

=== Transfers ===
Transfers for the 2026–27 season

Joining

- (Netherlands) (Cuba) Reinier Taboada (LB) from (Portugal) S.L. Benfica
- (Denmark) Thorsten Fries (GK) from (Denmark) KIF Kolding
- (Denmark) Rasmus Madsen (RB) from (Denmark) Mors-Thy Håndbold
- (Denmark) Kasper Teglgaard Pedersen (LP) from (Denmark) GOG Håndbold

Leaving

- (Denmark) Frederik Tilsted (CB) to (Switzerland) Kadetten Schaffhausen
- (Denmark) Julius Christian Sten (GK) to (France) Istres Provence Handball
- (Denmark) Jacob Bagersted (P) Retires

=== Transfer History ===
Transfers for the 2025–26 season

Joining

- (Sweden) Jesper Konradsson (CB) from (France) USAM Nîmes Gard
- (Denmark) Viktor Bergholt (LW) from (Denmark) Skjern Håndbold
- (Denmark) Emil La Cour (LW) (from (Denmark) GOG Håndbold)
- (Denmark) Nicolai Skytte (LB) from (Denmark) Grindsted Håndbold
- (Denmark) Frederik Tilsted (LB) from (Denmark) GOG Håndbold

Leaving

- (Germany) Patrick Volz (LW) loan back to (Germany) SG Flensburg-Handewitt
- (Denmark) Nikolaj Svalastog (LW) to (Denmark) Grindsted Håndbold
- (Germany) Lucas Rehfus (LB) to (Denmark) TM Tønder
- (Germany) Magnus Holpert (CB) to (Germany) VfL Lübeck-Schwartau
- (Denmark) Nicolaj Jørgensen (CB) to (Germany) HSV Hamburg
- (Sweden) August Wiger (CB) to (Sweden) Alingsås HK
- (Denmark) Tobias Olsen (RB) to (Denmark) Skive fH

== Kit manufacturers ==
- (Denmark) Hummel
