= 2011–12 Jack&Jones Ligaen =

Jack&Jones Ligaen
- Season: 2011–12
- Dates: 3 September 2011 - 2 June 2012
- Champions: AG København
- Relegated: Lemvig-Thyborøn Håndbold, Skive fH
- EHF Champions League: Bjerringbro-Silkeborg
- EHF Cup: KIF Kolding, TTH
- Matches: 182
- Goals: 9,804 (53.87 per match)
- Top goalscorer: Chris Jørgensen (153)
- Highest attendance: 10243 (Skjern - KIF, 10 December 2011)
- Lowest attendance: 280 (SønderjyskE - Nordsjælland, 10 December 2011)
- Average attendance: 1915

The 2011–12 Danish Handball League season, officially known as Jack & Jones Ligaen for sponsorship reasons, was the 76th edition of the Danish Handball League.

AG København won the title, when they beat Bjerringbro-Silkeborg in the final. Lemvig-Thyborøn Håndbold were relegated when they finished last in the regular season. Skive fH were relegated, when they lost the relegation play off match to TMS Ringsted.

After the season had concluded AG København went bankrupt, and they did therefore not compete in the following season. Skive fH were offered AG's place in the league, which they accepted, and they could therefore play in the 2012-13 Håndboldligaen.

== League table ==
=== Regular season ===
	Team	P	W	D	L	G+	G−	Diff.	Pts
1	AG København	26	23	1	2	768	627	+141	47
2	KIF Kolding	26	17	2	7	735	706	+29	36
3	Bjerringbro-Silkeborg	26	16	2	8	733	661	+72	34
4	Team Tvis Holstebro	26	13	5	8	755	689	+66	31
5	Skjern Håndbold	26	14	3	9	706	703	+3	31
6	AaB Håndbold	26	14	2	10	769	713	+56	30
7	Viborg HK	26	10	4	12	649	684	-35	24
8	Århus GF	26	10	3	13	716	713	+3	23
9	Mors-Thy HB	26	9	3	14	691	743	-52	21
10	Nordsjælland	26	9	3	14	641	689	-48	21
11	Skanderborg Håndbold	26	9	1	16	641	689	-48	19
12	SønderjyskE	26	7	3	16	698	736	-38	17
13	Skive fH	26	7	2	17	634	687	-53	16
14	Lemvig-Thyborøn	26	7	0	19	668	764	-96	14

Champion Playoff
Relegation Playoff
Relegation

=== Championship Round ===
==== Group 1 ====
	Team	P	W	D	L	G+	G−	Diff.	Pts
1	AG København	6	5	1	0	182	163	+19	13
2	Team Tvis Holstebro	6	3	1	2	165	159	+6	8
3	Århus GF	6	2	0	4	162	166	-4	4
4	Skjern Håndbold	6	0	2	4	152	173	-21	2

==== Group 2 ====
	Team	P	W	D	L	G+	G−	Diff.	Pts
1	Bjerringbro-Silkeborg	6	4	0	2	148	148	+0	9
2	KIF Kolding	6	3	0	3	166	149	+17	8
3	AaB Håndbold	6	4	0	2	171	150	+21	8
4	Viborg HK	6	1	0	5	127	165	-38	2

Champion Playoff
3rd Place

=== Semifinals ===
The semifinals were played on 12th and 13th of May (first leg) and 19th of May (second leg).

Team 1	Agg.	Team 2	1st leg	2nd leg
KIF Kolding	49 - 54	AG København	26 - 26	23 - 28
Team Tvis Holstebro	55 - 58	Bjerringbro-Silkeborg	26 - 23	29 - 35

=== 3rd Place ===
The matches were played on 24th and 30th of May

Team 1	Agg.	Team 2	1st leg	2nd leg
Team Tvis Holstebro	44 - 42	KIF Kolding	21 - 21	23 - 21

=== Finals ===
The finals were played on 30th of May and 2nd of June.

Team 1	Agg.	Team 2	1st leg	2nd leg
Bjerringbro-Silkeborg	40 - 52	AG København	19 - 30	21 - 22

== Relegation Groups ==
=== Group A ===
	Team	Games	W	D	L	Goals	GD	Points
1.	Mors-Thy Håndbold	6	4	0	2	169:157	+12	10
2.	Skanderborg Håndbold	6	3	0	3	154:147	+7	7
3.	TMS Ringsted	6	3	0	3	147:162	−15	7
4.	GOG	6	2	0	4	160:164	−4	4

=== Group B ===
	Team	Games	W	D	L	Goals	GD	Points
1.	SønderjyskE	6	5	0	1	188:163	+25	11
2.	Nordsjælland Håndbold	6	3	0	3	163:159	+4	8
3.	Skive fH	6	3	0	3	154:164	−10	6
4.	Odder Håndbold	6	1	0	5	178:197	−19	2

Legend
Qualified for Håndboldligaen 2012/13
Relegation play-off
Relegation

=== Relegation playoff ===
Date	Teams	Result
3 May	Skive fH – TMS Ringsted	32–25
5 May	TMS Ringsted - Skive fH	28–27
12 May	Skive fH – TMS Ringsted	25–28
