= Torben Winther =

Danish handball coach (born 1949)

Personal information
- Nationality: Danish
- Born: 16 January 1949 (age 77) Holbæk, Denmark

Sport
- Sport: Handball

Senior clubs
- Years: Team
- 1970–1973: HK Viben
- 1973–1982: Helsingør FC

Teams managed
- 1982–1986: Helsingør FC
- 1986–1989: SAGA/FIF
- 1989–1990: Rødovre HK women
- 1990–1994: Helsingør IF
- 1994–1997: Roar Roskilde
- 1997–2000: Team Helsinge
- 2000–2005: Denmark
- 2005–2006: Nordsjælland Håndbold
- 2006: Holbæk Elitesport
- 2007–2010: Ystads IF
- 2010–2013: HC Kriens-Luzern
Medal record
European Championship
Bronze medal – third place	2002 Sweden	Coach
Bronze medal – third place	2004 Slovenia	Coach

Torben Winther (born 16 January 1949) is a Danish handball coach, who was the head coach of the Danish national team from 2000 to 2005. He won two European bronze medals with Denmark.

== Coaching career ==
He started coaching in 1982 at his former club Helsingør FC, where he was until 1986. He then joined SAGA/FIF. In 1989 he became the head coach of Rødovre HK's women's team. In 1994 he joined Roar Roskilde, followed by Team Helsinge from 1997 to 2000.

He was then appointed head coach of the Danish national team. At the 2002 European Men's Handball Championship he won bronze medals, losing to Germany in the semifinal and beating Iceland in the third place-playoff. This was Denmark's first ever medals at a European Championship and first medals at any tournament since the 1967 World Championship.

At the 2003 World Men's Handball Championship he finished 9th with Denmark. The year after he would repeat his success at the European Championship with another bronze medal at the 2004 European Championship. He was fired after a disappointing 13th-place finish at the 2005 World Championship and replaced by Ulrik Wilbek.

Afterwards he was appointed head coach of the newly created Nordsjælland Håndbold, who played in the Danish 1st Division at the time. He was however fired in 2006 and replaced by his assistant Henrik Kronborg.

In 2006 he was the sporting director at Holbæk Elitesport for a single season.

From 2007 to 2010 he coached the Swedish club Ystads IF. He reached the semifinals of the Swedish Championship twice, but would lose of both occasions.

He then became the head coach of the Swiss club HC Kriens-Luzern. In 2013 he returned to Denmark to coach the U-18 team of TMS Ringsted.

== Playing career ==
Winther played first for HK Viben from 1970 to 1973 and then for Helsingør FC. As a player he won both the Danish Championship and Danish Cup. He also finished fourth in the Danish league 4 times with Helsingør. He played a few matches for the Danish youth teams, but never obtained a cap for the Danish national team.

== Private ==
He is educated as a teacher.
