= 2000–01 Håndboldligaen (men's handball) =

Danish Handball League
- Season: 2000–01
- Champions: KIF Kolding 7th title
- Relegated: HK Roar, Otterup HK
- EHF Champions League: KIF Kolding
- EHF Cup: GOG
- EHF Cup Winners' Cup: Viborg HK
- EHF Challenge Cup: Frederiksberg IF, Skjern Håndbold
- Matches: 189
- Top goalscorer: (Bosnia and Herzegovina) Bilal Šuman (178 goals)
- Total attendance: 128,007
- Average attendance: 682

The 2000–01 Danish Handball League season was the 56th edition of the Danish Handball League. GOG were the defending champions.

KIF Kolding won the title for a second year in a row, when they beat Bjerringbro FH in the finals. KIF Kolding also won the regular season. HK Roar and Otterup HK were relegated.

== League table ==
The regular season was a double round robin. The 4 best teams qualified for the championship playoff, while the 2 last-placed teams were relegated. The 12th and 11th place met in a relegation play-off. The rest qualified for the next season. The loser of the relegation play-off played the winner of the 1st Division in a play-off, where the winner was promoted to the 2001-02 Håndboldligaen.

=== Regular season ===
	Team	P	W	D	L	G+	G−	Pts
1	KIF Kolding	26	21	1	4	722	610	43
2	GOG	26	17	4	5	694	615	38
3	Frederiksberg IF	26	17	2	7	672	593	36
4	Virum-Sorgenfri HK	26	16	2	8	701	650	34
5	Skjern Håndbold	26	14	4	8	629	584	32
6	Bjerringbro FH	26	13	5	8	606	588	31
7	Viborg HK	26	14	2	10	692	643	30
8	Team Tvis Holstebro	26	14	1	11	661	611	29
9	Aalborg HSH	26	13	1	12	644	638	27
10	Team Helsinge	26	8	4	14	617	640	20
11	Ikast-Bording EH	26	6	3	17	613	671	15
12	Aarhus HK	26	5	4	17	632	727	14
13	Otterup HK	26	4	3	19	598	706	11
14	HK Roar	26	2	0	24	550	755	4

Champion Playoff
Relegation Playoff
Relegation

=== Championship Round ===
The championship round was played with two semifinals; one between the 1st and 4th placed and one between the 2nd and 3rd placed teams.

== Semifinals ==
Teams	Result
Virum-Sorgenfri – KIF Kolding	22–26
KIF Kolding – Virum-Sorgenfri	29–25

Teams	Result
GOG – Frederiksberg IF	31–26
Frederiksberg IF – GOG	26–18
GOG – Frederiksberg IF	21–18

=== Finals ===
Teams	Result
KIF Kolding – GOG	26–22
GOG – KIF Kolding	29–31
