= HC Midtjylland =

Danish handball club

- Full name: HC Midtjylland
- Short name: HCM
- Founded: 2005
- Arena: Sportcenter Herning
- Capacity: 1700
- President: Peter Andersen
- Head coach: Mads Hjortshøj
- League: Danish 1st Division
- 2025-26: 6th
- Club colours
| Home | Away |

HC Midtjylland is a handball club based in the town of Herning in Jutland, Denmark. They play in Danish 2nd tier Danish 1st Division.

== History ==
HC Midtjylland where founded in 2005 based on the local teams Hauge G/F and Herning FH. In the 2008/2009 season they finished 2nd in the Danish 1st Division and thus reached the promotion playoff for the first time. They did however lose to top flight team TMS Ringsted. Promotion came in the 2009/2010 season after finishing 3rd and going up through the playoffs.

Only the season after they were however relegated again. In the 2013/2014 season they gained promotion by winning the 1st Division. In 2015 they won the Danish Handball Cup despite struggling against relegation.

In 2018 they went bankrupt because of financial problems. The club resurrected, shortly after it went bankrupt, but was forced into the Danish 2nd Division.

In the first season they gained promotion from the 2nd division, and in 2021/2022 they were once again promoted to the top flight in Denmark. They were however relegated again only the next season, when they finished last in the 2022-23 Håndboldligaen.

== European record ==
| Season | Competition | Round | Club | 1st leg | 2nd leg | Aggregate |
|---|---|---|---|---|---|---|
| 2016–17 | EHF Cup | R3 | (Russia) Dinamo Astrakhan | 29–29 | 36–25 | 64–55 |
| 2016–17 | EHF Cup | Group Stage | (Spain) Fraikin Granollers | 24–27 | 32–34 | 4th place |
| 2016–17 | EHF Cup | Group Stage | (Portugal) FC Porto | 29–26 | 25–33 | 4th place |
| 2016–17 | EHF Cup | Group Stage | (Germany) Frisch Auf Göppingen | 23–31 | 22–25 | 4th place |

== Accomplishments ==
- Danish Handball Cup: 1
  - Gold: 2015

== Team ==
=== Current squad ===
Goalkeepers

- 1 (Denmark) Simon Egtved
- 16 (Denmark) Rasmus Døssing

Wingers
LW

- 14 (Denmark) Christian Højgaard Brandt
- 35 (Denmark) Kasper Søndergaard Kvist

RW

- 40 (Denmark) Laurits Kristensen
- 90 (Denmark) Magnus Møland Sønnichsen

Line players

- 5 (Denmark) Silas Krabbe
- 6 (Denmark) Valdemar Hermansen
- 54 (Denmark) Rasmus Mørup

Back players
LB

- 4 (Denmark) Rasmus Graffe
- 8 (Denmark) Matias Damgaard
- 10 (Denmark) Emil Vestergaard Larsen

CB

- 18 (Denmark) Matias Helt Jepsen

RB

- 9 (Denmark) Livio Klausen
- 13 (Denmark) Oscar von Oettingen

=== Technical staff ===
- (Denmark) Head coach: Claus Uhrenholt
- (Denmark) Assistant Coach: Martin Hansen
- (Denmark) Physical Trainer: Steffan Storgaard Espersen
- (Denmark) Physiotherapist: Gabriel Zaar Jensen
- (Denmark) Team Leader: Henrik Andersen

=== Transfers ===
Transfers for the 2026–27 season

Joining

Leaving

- (Denmark) Valdemar Hermansen (LP) to (Denmark) KIF Kolding

=== Transfer History ===
Transfers for the 2025–26 season

Joining

- (Denmark) Anton Bramming (LW) from (Denmark) Skanderborg AGF Håndbold
- (Denmark) Nicolai Snogdal (LW) (from (Denmark) TM Tønder)
- (Denmark) Malte Pedersen (LB) (from (Denmark) TM Tønder)
- (Denmark) Emil Jensen (CB) (from (Denmark) Lemvig-Thyborøn Håndbold)

Leaving

- (Denmark) Rasmus Graffe (CB) to (Denmark) TMS Ringsted
- (Denmark) Kasper Kvist (LW) (Retires)
