= Kasper Jørgensen (handballer) =

Danish handball player (born 1977)

Personal information
- Full name: Kasper Dan Jørgensen
- Nationality: Danish (Denmark)
- Born: 9 February 1977 (age 49) Gentofte, Denmark
- Height: 1.87 m (6 ft 2 in)

Sport
- Sport: Handball
- Position: Left Back
- Current club: GOG Gudme (CEO)

Senior clubs
- Years: Team
- 2004-2010: GOG
- 2010: Team Sydhavsøerne
- 2010-2015: GOG
National team
Years	Team	Apps	(Gls)
1998-2000	Denmark	3	(8)
Medal record
Representing Denmark
Men's Handball
Junior World Championship
Gold medal – first place	1997 Turkey	Team

Kasper Jørgensen (born 9 February 1977) is a Danish former handballer and handball coach, who has previously played for Danish Handball League side GOG. He is the current Managing Director of GOG, and coach since 2023.

In 2010 he was the playing director at GOG Håndbold, after the club had gone bankrupt and refounded in the Danish 3rd tier. The first season after the forced relegation, the 2010–11 season, the club was promoted to Danish 1st Division. In the 2012/2013 season, GOG managed to win the 1st division and was promoted back to the men's Danish Men's Handball League.

Jørgensen has made 3 appearances for the Danish national handball team, and during his youth years, he became World Champion with the Danish youth handball team in 1999.
