= Bilal Šuman =

Bosnian handball player and coach

Personal information
- Nationality: Bosnian
- Born: 9 June 1968 (age 58) Sarajevo, SFR Yugoslavia
- Height: 1.85 m (6 ft 1 in)

Sport
- Sport: Handball
- Position: Right wing

Youth career
- Years: Team
- 1982–1986: Igman Ilidža

Senior clubs
- Years: Team
- 1986–1988: Igman Ilidža
- 1988–1991: RK Pelister
- 1992–1993: KIF Kolding
- 1995–2006: KIF Kolding
National team
Years	Team	Apps	(Gls)
1997–2006	Bosnia and Herzegovina	32	(124)

Teams managed
- 2013–2014: KIF Kolding
- 2015–2016: KIF Kolding
- 2016–2021: Bosnia and Herzegovina

Bilal Šuman (born 9 June 1968) is a Bosnian former handball player and current coach. He has coached Danish Men's Handball League club KIF Kolding and the Bosnia and Herzegovina national team.

== Career ==
As a player, he played in the right wing position for Igman Ilidža and Eurofarm Pelister 2 in the former Yugoslavia and for KIF Kolding in Denmark and has also represented the Bosnia and Herzegovina men's national handball team, making 32 appearances and scoring 124 goals. With KIF Kolding he won the 1996 Danish Men's Handball Cup and was named MVP for the tournament. He is the only Bosnian (by 2025) to have been so. He was also the first non-Dane to win the award. In the 2000-01 season he was the top scorer in the Danish league with 178 goals.

As a coach, Šuman worked at Kolding where he won the 2013–14 Håndboldligaen and qualified Bosnia and Herzegovina for the 2020 EHF European Men's Handball Championship. He remained as Bosnia's coach until 17 February 2021.

== Personal life ==
Šuman's son, Benjamin, is also a professional handball player who plays as a left winger for his father's former club Kolding.

== Honours ==
=== Player ===
KIF Kolding

- Herreligaen: 1992–93, 2000–01, 2001–02, 2002–03, 2004–05, 2005–06
- Danish Cup: 1998–99, 2001–02, 2004–05

Individual

- Danish Cup MVP: 1996

=== Coach ===
KIF Kolding

- Herreligaen: 2013–14

Individual

- Bosnian Coach of the Year: 2019
