= Victor Norlyk =

Danish handball player (born 2003)

Personal information
- Full name: Victor Amnitzbøll Norlyk
- Nationality: Danish
- Born: 24 October 2003 (age 22) Aars, Danmark
- Height: 182 cm (72 in)

Sport
- Sport: Handball
- Position: Center back
- Current club: Mors-Thy Håndbold
- Number: 19

Youth career
- Years: Team
- –: Aars HK
- –2021: HF Mors

Senior clubs
- Years: Team
- 2021–2026: Mors-Thy Håndbold
- 2026–: HBC Nantes
National team
Years	Team	Apps	(Gls)
2026–	Denmark	1	(2)
- Updated on 20 March 2026

Victor Amnitzbøll Norlyk (born 24 October 2003) is a Danish handball player for Mors-Thy Håndbold and the Danish national team.

== Career ==
Norlyk started playing handball at Aars HF, before he joined the local top league club Mors-Thy Håndbold. In 2021 he made his debut in the Danish top league at the age of 17. In 2024 he extended his contract until 2027.

In 2026 he was sold to the French club HBC Nantes. In February 2026 he was the player of the month in the Danish league. At the end of the season he was included in the 2025-26 all-star team, when Mors-Thy reached the semifinals of the Danish Championship.

== National team ==
Norlyk played 15 matches for the Denmark men's national youth handball team. He played at the 2022 European Men's U-20 Handball Championship, where Denmark finished 8th.

He was called up to the Danish national team for the first time in March 2026 for the Golden League matches. He made his debut on 19 March 2026 against Norway.

== Private ==
His older brother Oliver Norlyk and his twin brother Magnus Norlyk are also handball players and have both played for Mors-Thy Håndbold.
