= Jeppe Riber =

Danish handballer (born 1985)

Personal information
- Nationality: Danish (Denmark)
- Born: 11 July 1982 (age 44) Esbjerg, Denmark
- Height: 189 cm (74 in)

Sport
- Sport: Handball
- Position: Left Wing
- Current club: Retired

Senior clubs
- Years: Team
- 2002-2011: Skjern Håndbold
- 2011-2015: Ribe-Esbjerg HH

Jeppe Riber (born 15 April 1985 in Esbjerg) is a Danish former handballer who played for the Danish league club Skjern Håndbold for 9 years as well as Ribe-Esbjerg HH. He retired in 2013 to have more time to his family and civil career, but decided to un-retire in 2014 to join Ribe-Esbjerg HH, as they were plagued by injuries. He played as a left winger.

He was the top scorer of the regular season in the 2012/2013 season with 196 goals.

After his playing career he has worked as a banker.
