= Henrik Kronborg =

Danish handball player and coach (born 1970)

Personal information
- Nationality: Danish
- Born: 16 June 1970 (age 56) Helsingør, Denmark

Sport
- Sport: Handball
- Current club: Aalborg Håndbold (assistant coach)

Senior clubs
- Years: Team
- –: Helsingør IF
- –: Team Helsinge
- –: Nordsjælland Håndbold
National team
Years	Team	Apps
1993	Denmark	1

Teams managed
- 2006–2011: Nordsjælland Håndbold
- 2011–2013: KIF Kolding København (assistant)
- 2013–2015: KIF Kolding København
- 2012: Denmark men's national junior handball team
- 2012–2013: Denmark (assistant)
- 2015–2019: Skjern Håndbold
- 2016–2026: Denmark (assistant)
- 2021–10/2023: Skjern Håndbold
- 12/2023–2025: HØJ Elite (sporting consultant)
- 2025–: Aalborg Håndbold (assistant)
- 2026–: Norway (men) (assistant)

Henrik Kronborg (born 16 June 1970) is a Danish handball coach, who is currently the assistant coach for Aalborg Håndbold. Until March 2026 he was the assistant coach on the Danish national team.

As a player he played a single match for the Danish national team in 1993. At club level he played for Helsingør IF, Team Helsinge and Nordsjælland Håndbold.

== Coaching career ==
=== Nordsjælland ===
In 2006 he became the head coach of Nordsjælland Håndbold, who had just been promoted to the Danish top league. Here he was until 2011. His best result was a 4th place in the 2009-10 season. He left the club as he was not satisfied with the player budget provided. From 2005 to 2007 he was also the assistant coach for the Danish youth team.

=== KIF Kolding København ===
Afterwards he joined KIF Kolding København, where he was from 2011 until 2015. First as the assistant and later as head coach. In October 2015 he was fired due to unsatisfying results. In 2012 he became the head coach of the Denmark men's national junior handball team alongside his position at Kolding København. Shortly afterwards he was appointed assistant coach on the Danish national team under Ulrik Wilbek. He left this position in December 2013 due to health concerns and was replaced by Klavs Bruun Jørgensen.

=== Skjern ===
In 2015 he joined Skjern Håndbold. Here he won the Danish Cup in 2016 and the 2018 Danish Championship. He then left Skjern in 2019.

In 2021 he returned to Skjern. In the lead-up to the 2023-24 season he announced his intention to leave the club after the season. He would however not last that long, as he was fired in 2023 due to a series of bad results. He was replaced by Mathias Madsen.

=== HØJ and Aalborg ===
Afterwards he became a sporting consultant at HØJ Elite.

After the 2024–25 season he left HØJ to become the assistant coach at Aalborg Håndbold under Simon Dahl. In his last season at HØJ he helped the team getting promoted to the top Danish league. In April 2026 he extended his contract with the club, together with Dahl until 2029.

=== The Danish national team ===
In 2016 he returned to the position as assistant coach on the Danish national team, this time under Nikolaj Jacobsen. This was by far the most successful period in Danish handball history with 4 World Championship titles, two Olympic gold medals, one Olympic silver medal and one European Championship.
