= TM Tønder =

Danish handball club

TM Tønder Håndbold
- Full name: Team Møgeltønder Tønder
- Short name: TM Tønder
- Founded: 1998; 28 years ago
- Arena: Hal2, Tønderhallerne, Tønder
- Capacity: 1,500
- President: Stefan Østerby-Jørgensen
- Head coach: Lars Krarup
- League: 1st Division
- 2025–26: 5th
- Club colours

TM Tønder Håndbold is a Danish handball club from Tønder. They play in the 1st Division, the second tier of Danish handball.

TM Tønder Håndbold was created as a fusion of Tønder SF Håndbold and Møgeltønder UIF. Initially the team was known as HF Vest Sønderjylland.

From 2004 to 2006 the club participated in the Southern Jutland club SønderjyskE Håndbold. When the men's team was moved to Sønderborg, TM Tønder decided to withdraw from the project as they deemed it too far from their base in Tønder/Møgeltønder.

The team was promoted to the top division, Herrehåndboldligaen, in the 2015-16 season after finishing 2nd in the 1st Division. They were promoted after play-off matches versus Nordsjælland Håndbold. In their first season they managed to survive, but they were relegated again in the 2017-18 season. In 2018-19 they narrowly missed promotion, when they lost the promotion play-off matches to KIF Kolding.

== Team ==
=== Current squad ===
Squad for the 2026–27 season

Goalkeepers

- (Democratic Republic of the Congo) Shadrach-Amie Nsoni

Left Wingers
Right Wingers

- (Denmark) Silas Frank

Line players

- (Denmark) Mads Emil Winterskov Møller

Left Backs

- (Germany) Lucas Rehfus
- (Denmark) Oliver Eggert

Central Backs
Right Backs

=== Transfers ===
Transfers for the 2026–27 season

Joining

- (Democratic Republic of the Congo) Shadrach-Amie Nsoni (GK) from (Denmark) Skive fH
- (Denmark) Oliver Eggert (LB) from (Switzerland) Pfadi Winterthur
- (Denmark) Silas Frank (RW) from (Denmark) Skanderborg AGF Håndbold

Leaving

- (Denmark) Magnus Siim Pedersen (GK) to (Denmark) Fredericia HK
- (Denmark) Mathias Nikolajsen (CB) to (Denmark) Skive fH
- (Denmark) Jonas Nielsen (RW) to (Denmark) Grindsted GIF Håndbold

=== Transfer History ===
Transfers for the 2025–26 season

Joining

- (Germany) Lucas Rehfus (LB) from (Denmark) Sønderjyske Handbold
- (Denmark) Mads Emil Winterskov Møller (LP) from (Denmark) Fredericia HK

Leaving
