= Peter Balling =

Danish handball player (born 1990)

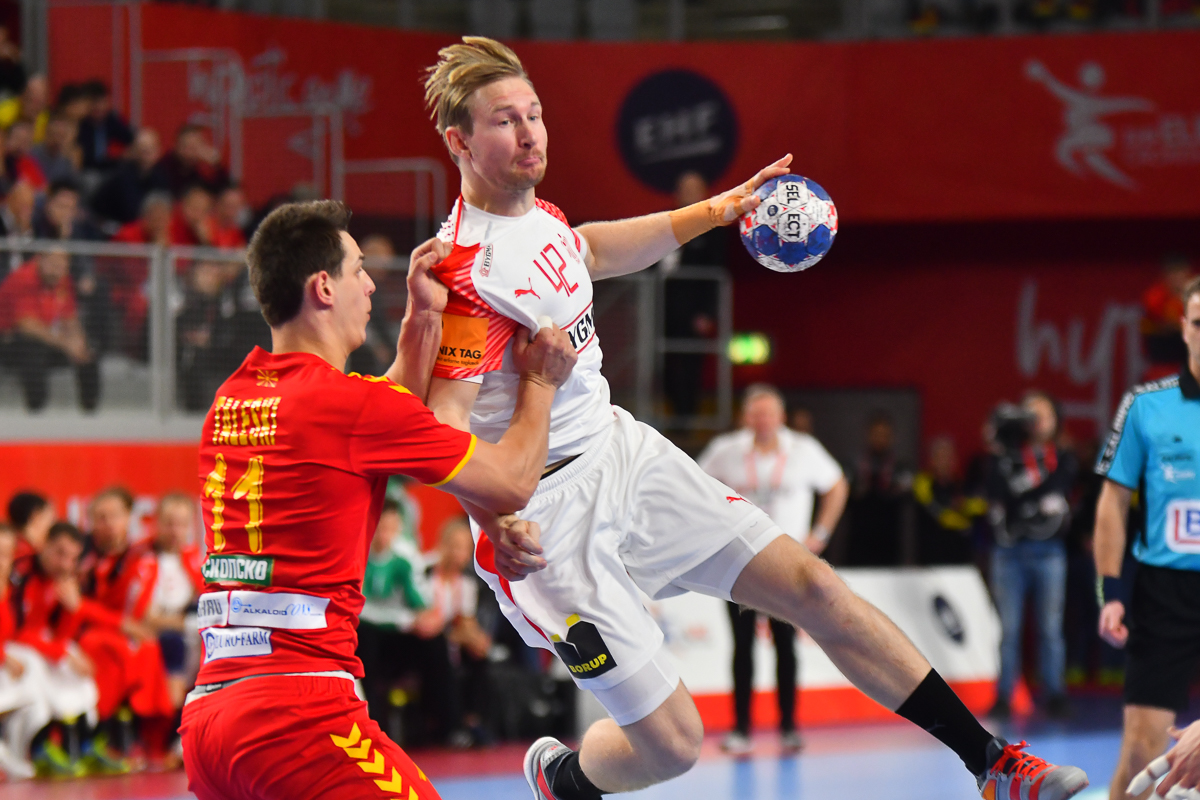

Personal information
- Full name: Peter Balling Christensen
- Nationality: Danish
- Born: 5 April 1990 (age 36) Skive, Denmark
- Height: 1.88 m (6 ft 2 in)

Sport
- Sport: Handball
- Position: Right back
- Current club: Bjerringbro-Silkeborg
- Number: 26

Senior clubs
- Years: Team
- 2008–2011: Mors-Thy Håndbold
- 2011–2014: Skanderborg Håndbold
- 2014–2020: TTH Holstebro
- 2020–2022: KIF Kolding
- 2022–: Bjerringbro-Silkeborg
National team
Years	Team	Apps	(Gls)
2015–	Denmark	26	(47)
- Updated on 20 March 2026

Peter Balling (born 5 April 1990) is a Danish handball player for Bjerringbro-Silkeborg Håndbold and the Danish national team.

He participated at the 2016 and 2018 European Men's Handball Championship.

He is the younger brother of fellow handball player Morten Balling.

== Career ==
Peter Balling started his senior career at Mors-Thy Håndbold, where he played for three years before moving to league rivals Skanderborg Håndbold. In 2015 he moved to TTH Holstebro. Here he won the Danish Supercup in 2018.

He played two seasons at KIF Kolding. In the 2021-22 he scored a crucial goal with 7 seconds remaining against TTH Holstebro, which prevented relegation for KIF. The following summer he then moved to Bjerringbro-Silkeborg Håndbold in 2022, citing the possibility to win medals with the club as the reason. In May 2026 he announced his intention to retire after the 2025–26 season.

He made his debut for the Danish national team in June 2015.
