= Odder Håndbold =

Danish handball club

- Arena: Spektrum Odder, Odder
- Capacity: 700
- President: Henrik Bentsen
- Head coach: Jacob Trangeled Knudsen
- League: 1st Division
- 2025-26: 9th
Home	Away

Odder Håndbold is a Danish handball team from Odder. The team played in the Herrehåndboldligaen in the 2014-15 season, which is their best result to date. They were relegated after a season getting only 4 points and 1 win. In 2020 they were administratively relegated to the 2nd Division, the third tier, for economic reasons. They were promoted to the 1st Division again a season later.

== Team ==
=== Current squad ===
Squad for the 2026–27 season

Goalkeepers
Left Wingers
Right Wingers
Line players

Left Backs
Central Backs
Right Backs

=== Transfers ===
Transfers for the 2026–27 season

Joining

Leaving

- (Denmark) Simon Toft (GK) to (Denmark) Skive fH
