= Nordsjælland Håndbold =

Danish handball club

- Founded: 2006
- Arena: Helsinge Hallerne; Helsingør-hallen
- Capacity: 2,500
- President: Jørgen Simonsen
- Head coach: Laurids Søgaard
- League: Håndboldligaen
- 2025–26: Håndboldligaen, 10th of 14
- Club colours
Home	Away

Nordsjælland Håndbold is a handball club, based in Northern Zealand. The team has three home towns: Helsinge, Helsingør and Hillerød. Currently, Nordsjælland Håndbold competes in the men's Danish Handball League, and plays its home matches in Helsinge-Hallen in Helsinge. The women's team is competing in the third-best tier of the women's Danish league system.

== History ==
=== Founding ===
The club was founded in 2006, when Team Helsinge and Hillerød HK merged their first teams to create the new club. Team Helsinge was founded back in 1993. The plans for the creation of the club were started in October 2005 and played on Team Helsinge's license. Originally Helsingør Elite 3000 were intended to also take part, but they withdrew shortly before the announcement. In their first season, 2006-07 the team gained promotion to the Danish Handball League. Afterwards the team hired Henrik Kronborg as coached. In November 2007 the first fan club for the team were created.

In April 2008 the women's team were promoted to the 1st Division. Later the same year Elite 3000 finally joined the club after 3 negotiation attempts, meaning that the team now had three home courts. In the 2008-09 season the women's team were relegated again to the 2nd Division.

In the 2009-10 season the men's team qualified for an international tournament: the 2010-11 EHF Cup. Their international debut came against Israeli Hapoel Rishon LeZion. They were knocked out in the quarterfinals by Spanish team Naturhouse La Rioja.

=== After Henrik Kronborg ===
In April 2011 Henrik Kronborg leaves the position as head coach, as he was not satisfied with the budget for player acquisitions. To replace him the club hired Kristian Kristensen, but he only lasted until January in his first season due to mediocre results. To replace him the club hired Klavs Bruun Jørgensen as head coach.

In the 2011-12 season the team reached the final4 of the Danish Cup for the first time, beating Bjerringbro-Silkeborg in the quarterfinal.

In the 2012/2013 season the team finished in the relegation spots, but due to the bankruptcy and subsequent forced relegation of Viborg HK, the team could remain in the top division. In 2013 the club hired ther former player Ian Marko Fog as head coach. In the 2013/2014 season however the team was relegated, when they finished last in their relegation playoff. Despite that the team decided to stick with their head coach, Marko Fog.

In the 1st Division the first team was overhauled and a focus was put on local young talent. The strategy worked well, and the team was promoted once again.

=== Relegation turmoil in 2015-16 ===
In the 2015/2016 season Nordsjælland finished in the relegation playoff position. They met TM Tønder Håndbold, who had finished 2nd in the 1. division. This turned out to be a highly controversial match due to a late red card for Nordsjælland goalkeeper and penalty throw for Tønder, when he threw the ball away in the last seconds to prevent Tønder from getting the ball.

In the following season Nordsjælland won the 1. Division and was promoted back to the top division. The same season the women's team were promoted to the 2nd Division again.

=== 2017 to present day ===
In the 2017-18 season the club reached the Championship play-offs despite being tipped for relegation. Head coach Ian Marko Fog was named Danish Men's Coach of the Year as a result.

In June 2019 Ian Marko Fog resigned as head coach after 6 seasons. Nordsjælland promoted former assistant Simon Dahl as his replacement. He left this position in 2023 to become the assistant coach at Aalborg Håndbold. He was replaced by Icelandic coach Halldór Sigfússon.

In the 2019-20 season, the team were relegated. Due to the COVID-19 pandemic, Dansk Håndbold decided to cancel the season after 24 rounds, and as Nordsjælland were last in the table at the time, they were relegated. They were back in the top league for the 2021-22 season after winning the 20-21 Danish 1st Division.

In 2024 the stock majority was sold to Team Red Performance Håndbold Elite, which stated that the intended to bring the capital to make Nordsjælland one of the best teams in Denmark. For the 2024-25 season the team appointed former assistant coach and chief of talent development, Laurids Søgaard.

=== Coaching history ===
- 2005–2006 (Denmark) Torben Winther
- 2006–2011 (Denmark) Henrik Kronborg
- 2011–2012 (Denmark) Kristian Kristensen
- 2012–2012 (Denmark) Klavs Bruun Jørgensen
- 2013–2019 (Denmark) Ian Marko Fog
- 2019–2023 (Denmark) Simon Dahl
- 2023–2024 (Iceland) Halldór Sigfússon
- 2024– (Denmark) Laurids Søgaard

== Team ==
=== Staff ===
Pos.	Name
Head Coach	Laurids Søgaard
Assistant Coach	Christoffer Zinck
Physical Trainer	Per Nielsen
Goalkeeping Coach	Mathias Ekstrøm
Team Leader	Hans-Chr. Hæsum Pedersen
Team Leader	Ib Mathiesen
Physiotherapist	Rasmus Hartmann
Physiotherapist	Peter Christiansen

=== Current squad ===
Squad for the 2026-27 season

Goalkeeper

- 1 (Denmark) Carl Poulsen (on loan at Team Sydhavsøerne)
- 12 (Norway) Emil Kheri Imsgard
- 16 (Sweden) Erik Hvenfelt

Wingers
LW

- 14 (Denmark) Rasmus Madsbøll
- 37 (Denmark) Martin Theter

RW

- 3 (Denmark) Carl-Emil Haunstrup
- 38 (Denmark) Henrik Theter

Pivots

- 6 (Sweden) Marcus Björkman
- 9 (Norway) August Olsen Storbugt
- 35 (Denmark) Mads Nickelsen

Back players
LB

- 8 (Sweden) Martin Lindell
- 17 (Denmark) Nichlas Hald

CB

- 7 (Sweden) Isak Larsson
- 10 (Denmark) Rasmus Arvling Andreasen
- 42 (Denmark) Matias Campbell

RB

- 4 (Denmark) Aksel Hørlykke (on loan at Køge Håndbold)
- 20 (Denmark) Jesper Dahl
- 57 (Denmark) Nikolaj Larsson

DF

- 33 (Denmark) Erik Skat Tiedje

=== Transfers ===
Transfers for the 2026–27 season

Joining

- (Norway) Emil Kheri Imsgard (GK) from (Denmark) HØJ Elite
- (Sweden) Isak Larsson (CB) from (Sweden) HF Karlskrona
- (Sweden) Marcus Björkman (LP) from (Sweden) OV Helsingborg
- (Denmark) Nichlas Hald (LB) from (Denmark) Mors-Thy Håndbold
- (Denmark) Andrew Wisman (LB) (back from loan at (Sweden) Ystads IF)
- (Denmark) Jacob Bro Sørensen (CB) (back from loan at (Sweden) OV Helsingborg)
- (Sweden) Marcus Björkman (LP) (from (Sweden) OV Helsingborg)

Leaving

- (France) Léo Martinez (CB) to (France) Istres Provence Handball
- (Denmark) Tim Hjorth Rantala (LP) to (Sweden) Ystads IF
- (Denmark) Julius Mørch (LP) to (Denmark) Fredericia HK
- (Denmark) Mathias Kragh (LW) to (Denmark) KIF Kolding
- (Denmark) Gustav Bruun (LB) to (Denmark) Skanderborg AGF Håndbold
- (Denmark) Jacob Bro Sørensen (CB) to (Denmark) HC København
- (Denmark) Jimmi Andersen (GK) (to ?)
- (Denmark) Carl Poulsen (GK) (on loan to (Denmark) Team Sydhavsøerne)
- (Denmark) Andrew Wisman (LB) (to (Iceland) HK Handbolti)

=== Transfer History ===
Transfers for the 2025–26 season

Joining

- (Sweden) Erik Hvenfelt (GK) from (Sweden) Ystads IF
- (Sweden) Martin Lindell (LB) from (Norway) Runar Sandefjord
- (Norway) August Olsen Storbugt (LP) from (Norway) Drammen HK
- (Denmark) Jacob Bro Sørensen (CB) back from loan at (Denmark) Roskilde Håndbold
- (Denmark) Nikolai Kløigaard (RW) back from loan at (Denmark) Roskilde Håndbold

Leaving

- (Norway) Thomas Boilesen (LB) to (Norway) Runar Sandefjord
- (Denmark) Magnus Petersen (GK) to (Denmark) Skanderborg AGF Håndbold
- (Denmark) Nikolai Kløigaard (RW) to (Denmark) Lemvig-Thyborøn Håndbold
- (Denmark) Jonas Raundahl (LP) to (Denmark) TTH Holstebro
- (Denmark) Oliver Klarskov (CB) to (Denmark) Roskilde Håndbold
- (Sweden) Assar Kammenhed (RB) (to (France) Istres Provence Handball)
- (Denmark) Andreas Dysseholm (RW) (break from handball)
- (Denmark) Konrad Hübner (LP) (to (Switzerland) Pfadi Winterthur)
