= Team Sydhavsøerne =

Danish handball club

- Founded: May 2003; 23 years ago
- Arena: Maribo-Hallerne, Maribo, Denmark
- Capacity: 1,800, 725 seated
- President: Lars Stuckert
- Head coach: Morten Harkjær Nielsen
- League: 1st Division
- 2025–26: 4th

Team Sydhavsøerne is a handball club from Lolland, Denmark. They play their matches at Maribo-Hallerne in Maribo. They play in the 1st Division, the second tier of Danish Handball.

== History ==
The team was founded in May 2003 by Rødby Håndboldklub. The team started in the 2nd Division, the third tier of Danish handball. Three years later Håndboldklubben Maribo/Hunseby joined the club, and became the co-owner with 50% of the stakes. In this period home matches were played in both Rødby and Maribo. In 2021 Rødby HK sold most of their shares to NMH, keeping only about 10%. From then on home matches were only played in Maribo.

In 2005 the team was promoted to the 1st Division, but were relegated in 2007.

== Team ==
=== Current squad ===
Squad for the 2025–26 season

Goalkeepers

- (Denmark) Atal Lakanval

Left Wingers
Right Wingers
Line players

Left Backs

- (Denmark) Frederik Albrechtsen

Central Backs

- (Denmark) Mathias Nikolajsen

Right Backs

- (Denmark) Dines Kjeldgaard

=== Transfers ===
Transfers for the 2026–27 season

Joining

- (Denmark) Frederik Albrechtsen (LB) from (Denmark) TMS Ringsted
- (Denmark) Atal Lakanval (GK) from (Denmark) Skive fH

Leaving

=== Transfer History ===
Transfers for the 2025–26 season

Joining

- (Denmark) Dines Kjeldgaard (RB) from (Denmark) TMS Ringsted
- (Denmark) Mathias Nikolajsen (CB) from (Denmark) HØJ Elite

Leaving

== Notable former players ==
- (Denmark) Nicolaj Jørgensen
- (Denmark) Kasper Jørgensen
