= TMS Ringsted =

Danish handball club

- Full name: Team Midtsjælland Ringsted
- Short name: TMS
- Founded: 5 December 1997; 28 years ago
- Arena: Ringsted-Hallen
- Capacity: 1600
- President: Henrik Dudek
- Head coach: Kenneth Olsen (Men); Per Wulff (Women)
- League: Danish Handball League (Men); 1st Division (Women)
- 2024-25: 12th (men); 11th (relegation) (women)
- Club colours
Home	Away

TMS Ringsted is a handball club from Ringsted, Denmark. Currently, TMS Ringsted competes in the men's Danish Handball League, whereas the women's team competes in the 1st Division. The home arena of the club is Ringsted-Hallen.

== History ==
The club was founded on 15 December 1997, when Vetterslev-Høm G.F and Ringsted IF merged their first teams to create the new club. TMS is an abbreviation for Team Midtsjælland (Team central Zealand), the area in which Ringsted is located. The club has been nicknamed the "Ring Stingers" by fans. The club gained their first promotion to the Danish Handball League in 2003. In their first season the team was close to going bankrupt, but narrowly avoided doing so.

In the 2020-21 TMS Ringsted finished last in the table, and should thus by league rules have been relegated. However, in April 2021, after the conclusion of the regular season, Aarhus Håndbold, was declared bankrupt. Their team was pulled out of the league, and their matches were considered not contested. Nordsjælland Håndbold won the First Division, the second tier, and was thus promoted to the Håndboldligaen. Skive fH won the First Division play-off round and thus had to meet the worst placed team in the Håndboldligaen relegation round. This would be Aarhus Håndbold, as they had not competed, and thus had not gained any points at all. However, TMS Ringsted decided to appeal the relegation, and it was found that due to Aarhus Håndbold's bankruptcy, they had the right to remain in the league. This was decided after Skive fH had already secured promotion, as Aarhus Håndbold could not compete. This meant that only one team was relegated, but two were promoted. Therefore, it was decided that for the following season the league would have 15, not 14 teams.

The next season, 2021-22 the club was however relegated, with 19 points, the same amount as KIF Kolding and TTH Holstebro, but they had a worse head-to-head record of the three. The season after they were promoted again to the top league.

In the 2023-24 season the men's team reached the championship play-off for the first time in club history. In April 2024 the club had their first ever national team player, when Benjamin Hallgren was selected for the Norwegian national team.

In 2026 they reached the final of the Danish Men's Handball Cup for the first time in club history. They did however lose the final 34–24 to Aalborg Håndbold.

== Current squad ==
Squad for the 2026-27 season

Goalkeeper

- 1 (Bosnia and Herzegovina) Ante Grbavac
- 29 (Denmark) Malte Eichhorst
- 71 (Czech Republic) Šimon Mizera

Wingers
Left Wing

- 20 (Faroe Islands) Jàkup Egholm
- 27 (Denmark) Victor Wolf

Right Wing

- 11 (Denmark) Mikkel Helqvist
- 37 (Denmark) Karl Albert

Pivots

- 19 (Denmark) Valdemar Landvad
- 34 (Sweden) Gustav Karl Håkan Bergendahl
- 41 (Germany) Evgeni Pevnov

Back players
Left Back

- 17 (Sweden) William Elovson
- 23 (Denmark) Frederik Bertelsen
- 43 (Denmark) Andreas Tesgaard
- 44 (Denmark) Tobias Tombak

Center Back

- 4 (Denmark) Rasmus Graffe
- 35 (Egypt) Ahmed Sameh

Right Back

- 5 (Faroe Islands) Pauli Rasmussen
- 13 (Norway) Birk Hermann Inselseth
- 14 (Iceland) Isak Gústafsson

=== Transfers ===
Transfers for the 2026–27 season

Joining

- (Bosnia and Herzegovina) Ante Grbavac (GK) (from (Croatia) RK Zagreb)
- (Faroe Islands) Jàkup Egholm (LW) (from (Faroe Islands) H71)
- (Sweden) William Elovson (LB) from (Sweden) IFK Skövde
- (Faroe Islands) Pauli Rasmussen (RB) (from (Faroe Islands) Stranda Ítróttarfelag)
- (Germany) Evgeni Pevnov (P) from (Denmark) Fredericia HK

Leaving

- (Sweden) Axel Andersson (LW) (to ?)
- (Denmark) Oliver Wosniak (LB) to (Denmark) Mors-Thy Håndbold
- (Denmark) Frederik Albrechtsen (LB) to (Denmark) Team Sydhavsøerne
- (Iceland) Guðmundur Bragi Ástþórsson (CB) to (Austria) Bregenz Handball
- (Denmark) Joachim Møller (P) to (Denmark) Skjern Håndbold

=== Transfer history ===
Transfers for the 2025–26 season

Joining

- (Czech Republic) Šimon Mizera (GK) from (Norway) Elverum Håndball
- (Denmark) Frederik Bertelsen (LB) (from (Denmark) Skanderborg AGF Håndbold)
- (Denmark) Frederik Albrechtsen (LB)
- (Denmark) Rasmus Graffe (CB) from (Denmark) HC Midtjylland
- (Iceland) Guðmundur Bragi Ástþórsson (CB) from (Denmark) Bjerringbro-Silkeborg Håndbold
- (Egypt) Ahmed Sameh (CB) (from (Egypt) Zamalek SC) (20th November 2025)
- (Norway) Birk Hermann Inselseth (RB) from (Norway) ØIF Arendal
- (Iceland) Ísak Gústafsson (RB) from (Iceland) Valur
- (Denmark) Karl Albert (RW) from (Denmark) HØJ Elite
- (Sweden) Gustav Bergendahl (P) from (Norway) Nærbø Håndball
- (Denmark) Valdemar Landvad (P) (from (Germany) SG Flensburg-Handewitt)

Leaving

- (Denmark) Andreas Haagen (GK) to (Denmark) Ribe-Esbjerg HH
- (Denmark) Christoffer Dreyer (LB) to (Denmark) Skanderborg AGF Håndbold
- (Denmark) Oscar Lykke (LB) to (Iceland) UMF Afturelding
- (Denmark) Mark Nikolajsen (CB) (retires)
- (Norway) Benjamin Hallgren (RB) to (Denmark) Ribe-Esbjerg HH
- (Denmark) Dines Kjeldgaard (RB) to (Denmark) Team Sydhavsøerne
- (Denmark) Tobias Nielsen (RW) to (Denmark) Aalborg Håndbold
- (Denmark) Rasmus Winther (RW) to (Denmark) HC København
- (Belgium) Simon Ooms (P) to (France) Cesson Rennes MHB
- (Denmark) Anders Agger Pedersen (P) to (Norway) Elverum Håndball

== Women's team ==
=== Staff ===
Pos.	Name
Head Coach	(Denmark) Kevin Arildtoft Moer
Physical Trainer	(Denmark) Oliver Vallebo
Team Manager	(Denmark) Per Byrialsen
Physiotherapist	(Denmark) Charlotte Kaas

=== Current squad ===
Squad for the 2024-25 season

Goalkeeper

- 1 (Denmark) Frederikke De Sparra Rasmussen
- 35 (Denmark) Stella Jensen

Wingers
LW

- 15 (Iceland) Harpa María Friðgeirsdóttir
- 17 (Denmark) Julie Kibenich

RW

- 9 (Denmark) Thea Frejlev Merrild

Pivots

- 7 (Norway) Maria Kvannli
- 18 (Denmark) Silje Marie Agerbo
- 26 (Denmark) Alberte Rasmussen
- 33 (Denmark) Christine Grøn Veggerby

Back players
LB

- 27 (Norway) Isabel Gunnerød
- 39 (Denmark) Kamilla Marcher Kristiansen¨
- 50 (Denmark) Freja Green Jensen

CB

- 5 (Denmark) Natascha Wollesen
- 24 (Denmark) Laura Stjerne Green
- 51 (Denmark) Zara Bargfeldt

RB

- 25 (Denmark) Mathilde Dohn
- 64 (France) Alexandra Lacrabère

=== Transfers ===
Transfers for the season 2024-25

Joining

- (Denmark) Kevin Arildtoft Moer (Head Coach)
- (Denmark) Frederikke De Sparra Rasmussen (GK) (from (Denmark) HØJ Elite)
- (Denmark) Stella Jensen (GK) (from own rows)
- (Iceland) Harpa María Friðgeirsdóttir (LW) ( (Iceland) Fram Reykjavik)
- (Denmark) Julie Kibenich (LW) (from own rows)
- (Norway) Isabel Gunnerød (LB) (from (Norway) Randesund IL)
- (Denmark) Matilde Dohn (LB) (from own rows)
- (Denmark) Freja Green Jensen (LB) (from own rows)
- (Denmark) Laura Stjerne Green (CB) (from own rows)
- (Denmark) Zara Bargfeldt (CB) (from own rows)
- (France) Alexandra Lacrabère (RB) (comeback)
- (Denmark) Thea Frejlev Merrild (RW) (from (Denmark) Gunslevholm Idrætsefterskole)
- (Norway) Maria Kvannli (P) (from (Denmark) Ajax København)
- (Denmark) Christine Grøn Veggerby (P) (from own rows)
- (Denmark) Silje Marie Agerbo (P) (from own rows)
- (Denmark) Alberte Rasmussen (P) (from own rows)

Leaving

- (Denmark) Tomas Laursen (Head Coach)
- (Denmark) Dan Hansen (Assistant Coach)
- (Denmark) Christina Gregersen (Goalkeeper Coach)
- (Denmark) Sofie Flintholm Andersen (GK) (to (Denmark) Ajax København)
- (Denmark) Philipa Poulsen (GK)
- (Denmark) Josephine Togsverd (GK)
- (Denmark) Sylvie Gamys (LW) (to (Denmark) Ajax København)
- (Denmark) Berinda Tükenmez (LW)
- (Denmark) Emilie West (LW)
- (Denmark) Anne Cathrine Lundbye (LB) (to (Denmark) HØJ Elite)
- (Denmark) Mathilde Blaabjerg Madsen (LB)
- (Denmark) Laura Bjaldby (LB) (to (Denmark) Rødovre HK)
- (Denmark) Louise Hansen (LB)
- (Denmark) Nikoline Holden (CB) (to (Denmark) Randers HK)
- (Faroe Islands) Liv Poulsen (RB) (to (Denmark) EH Aalborg)
- (Denmark) Nicoline Vendelborg (RW) (to (Sweden) Lugi HF)
- (Denmark) Frida Svingholm (P) (Retires)
- (Denmark) Laura Westerdahl-Møller (P)
- (Denmark) Alberte Kristensen (P)
- (Faroe Islands) Var Bentsdóttir Zachariasen (P) (to (Denmark) Ajax København)
