= Skive fH =

Danish handball club

- Full name: Skive forenede Håndboldklubber
- Founded: 1982; 44 years ago
- Arena: Interfjord Arena
- Capacity: 2,100
- President: Peter Andersen
- Head coach: Arne Damgaard
- League: 1st Division
- 2025-26: 1st place (promotion)
Home	Away

Skive fH (Skive forenede Håndboldklubber) is a Danish handball club from Skive. The club has a team in the men's 1st Division. They play their home matches in Freja Arena.

The Club is a fusion between Skive KFUM and Skive Håndboldklub and is among the country's biggest handball clubs with approximately 600 members, 7 senior teams and 50 youth teams.

== History ==
The team was founded in 1982 as a fusion between Skive KFUM and Skive Håndboldklub.

In the 2008-09 season the team won their group in the 2nd Division, the third tier of Danish handball, and was promoted to the 1st Division. In the 2010-11 season they came second in the 1st Division and thus qualified for the promotion play-off against Viborg HK and Fredericia HK from the top league and Skanderborg Håndbold from the 1st Division. With 3 wins and a draw they secured promotion.

In season 2011/12 they ended second-to-last in the regular season and then being no. 3 in the relegation playoff. Then they lost by 1-2 in matches to TMS Ringsted, meaning they should have been relegated to the 1st division. But during the summer of 2012 went AG København bankrupt, and therefore Skive fH was offered the extra space in the league, which they accepted. In the 2013-14 season the team was however relegated.

The club has previously had a women's team, that played in the top division, Damehåndboldligaen. On March 15th, 2015 the team decided to withdraw their women's team from the Damehåndboldligaen as the club board did not believe, they could finance two top league teams.

In the 2020-21 season the team was once again promoted to the top league after five years' hiatus. In the following season they were however relegated again after finishing last in the regular season. In the 2025-26 season they were promoted again by winning the 1st Division.

== Men's team ==
=== Current squad ===
Squad for the 2026–27 season

Goalkeepers

- 1 (Denmark) Kasper Larsen
- 12 (Denmark) Simon Toft
- 45 (Denmark) Philip Gludsted

Wingers
LW

- 8 (Denmark) Jeppe Bangshøi
- 11 (Denmark) Sebastian Skøtt

RW

- 3 (Denmark) Victor Ilsøe
- 10 (Denmark) Jeppe Dyring
- 17 (Denmark) Mikkel Lang Rasmussen

Line players

- 21 (Denmark) Christoffer Langerhuus
- 23 (Denmark) Daniel Guldsmed
- 33 (Denmark) Mads Tingleff
- 91 (Denmark) Gustav Østergaard

Back players
LB

- 7 (Denmark) Nikolaj Haagen Pytlick
- 9 (Denmark) Jens Dolberg Plougstrup

CB

- 4 (Denmark) Tobias Laursen
- 5 (Denmark) Joachim Hyldgaard
- 20 (Denmark) Mathias Nikolajsen
- 47 (Denmark) Nickolei Jensen

RB

- 6 (Denmark) Nicolaj Kjær Spanggaard
- 14 (Denmark) Tobias Olsen

=== Transfers ===
Transfers for the 2026–27 season

Joining

- (Denmark) Kasper Larsen (GK) from (Denmark) Bjerringbro-Silkeborg Håndbold
- (Denmark) Nicolaj Spanggaard (RB) from (Denmark) Ribe-Esbjerg HH
- (Denmark) Simon Toft (GK) from (Denmark) Odder Håndbold
- (Denmark) Mathias Nikolajsen (CB) from (Denmark) TM Tønder
- (Denmark) Mikkel Lang Rasmussen (RW)

Leaving

- (Democratic Republic of the Congo) Shadrach-Amie Nsoni (GK) to (Denmark) TM Tønder
- (Denmark) Atal Lakanval (GK) to (Denmark) Team Sydhavsøerne
- (Denmark) Magnus Kronborg (CB) to (Denmark) Rækker Mølle Håndbold
- (Denmark) Simon Bak Ostersen (RB) to (Denmark) Rækker Mølle Håndbold
- (Denmark) Peter Torpegaard Lund (RW)
