= Arena Vestjylland Forsikring =

Danish indoor sports arena

Coordinates: 56°32′28″N 8°17′56″E

- Interactive map of Arena Vestjylland Forsikring
- Capacity: 1,400

Tenants
- Lemvig-Thyborøn Håndbold; Lemvig Basket

Arena Vestjylland Forsikring (West Jutland Insurance), or Lemvig Idræts- & Kulturcenter, is an indoor sports arena in Lemvig, Denmark. It has a capacity of 1,400 spectators and is the home court of the handball team, Lemvig-Thyborøn Håndbold and the basketball club Lemvig Basket.

The arena contains a handball court, six badminton courts, three volleyball courts and a basketball court.
