= Ringsted-Hallen =

Indoor sports arena in Ringsted, Denmark

Coordinates: 55°26′51″N 11°48′02″E

Ringsted-Hallen is an indoor sports arena in Ringsted, Denmark primarily used for handball. The arena was built in 1997 and holds 1,600 spectators (approx. 600 seated).

It is home to the Danish Handball League side TMS Ringsted.
