= Gudme-Hallerne =

Sports complex in Gudme, Funen, Denmark

Coordinates: 55°8′54.31″N 10°42′32.47″E

Gudme-hallerne is a complex of indoor sports arenas in the town of Gudme on Funen, Denmark. The arena is primarily used for handball, and is home to as well the men's Danish Handball League team GOG, and the women's 1st Division team.

The construction began September 1, 1972. It was first taken into use on October 2, 1972. For many years the arena had been planned in Svendborg Amt. On June 29, 1966 the first planning meeting took place between the relevant sports associations.

The first arena had only one handball court. Because of GOG's sporting success, additional training facilities were requisted in 1992. The plans were soon expanded from a training court to a public court with room for spectators, which became the hall now known as 'Hal1'. The first match took place on October 3, 1993; a match in the EHF Cup. The construction was however first completely finished on January 7, 1994.

In 2022 it was announced that a new arena in the nearby town, Svendborg was planned to serve as the home arena for GOG Håndbold as well as the basketball team Svendborg Rabbits. The plans sparked a debate on where the GOG team really belonged.
