= Helsinge-Hallen =

Sports arena in Denmark

Coordinates: 56°1′27″N 12°11′9″E

Helsinge-Hallen is an indoor sports arena in Helsinge, Denmark, primarily used for handball. The arena can hold 1,600 spectators and is home to Danish Handball League team Nordsjælland Håndbold. There are also fields for soccer, tennis, sports shooting and a swimming pool.

The construction was completed on November 5th, 1966. It was built partly by volunteers.
