= Lemvig-Thyborøn Håndbold =

Danish handball club

- Full name: Lemvig-Thyborøn Håndbold
- Founded: 1969
- Arena: Vestjysk BANK Arena
- Capacity: 1.400
- Head coach: Dennis Bo Jensen
- League: 1st Division (men)
- 2025-26: 7th
- Club colours
Home	Away

Lemvig-Thyborøn Håndbold is a handball team from Lemvig, Denmark. It plays in the Danish Handball League. Their head coach is Arne Damgaard.

== History ==
Lemvig-Thyborøn Håndbold's license belongs to the parent club Lemvig Nissum Håndbold, which was founded way back in 1969, under the name NNFH Lemvig. The team reached the top division of Danish handball for the first time in 1975, and played there until 1978. The best result in club history was when the club won the Danish Men's Handball Cup in 1984. Their best league result ever was a third place finish in the top league in 1987. In 2006, a professional elite division was created for the best men's team, first under the name Lemvig Håndbold, and later Lemvig-Thyborøn Håndbold. In their first season under a new name, the club was relegated to the 1st Division.

In the 2023–24 season they were relegated to the 1st Division after finishing last in the league.

Location of Lemvig-Thyborøn Håndbold

== Team ==
=== Staff ===
Staff for the 2025-26 season

Pos.	Name
Head Coach	Peter Jagd
Assistant Coach	Tobias Thorsen
Team Leader	Mikael Pedersen
Team Leader	Kenneth Slavensky
Physiotherapist	Lasse Sørensen
Physiotherapist	Malene Dissing

=== Current squad ===
Squad for the 2026-27 season

Goalkeeper

- 1 (Denmark) Simon Lundorf
- 16 (Denmark) Kim Sonne

Wingers
LW

- 13 (Denmark) Oliver Hamann-Boeriths
- 18 (Denmark) Emil Kristensen

RW

- 5 (Denmark) Mads Stensgård
- 17 (Denmark) Nikolai Kløigaard

Line Players

- 7 (Denmark) Niels Lindholt
- 14 (Norway) Fredrik Clementsen
- 74 (Norway) Sigurd Nordjordet Villadsen

Back players
LB

- 25 (Denmark) Jonas Porup (c)
- 33 (Denmark) Ole Ellegaard
- 77 (Denmark) Marius Elgaard

CB

- 15 (Denmark) Jonas Fuglsbjerg
- 21 (Iceland) Jón Ísak Halldórsson

RB

- 23 (Denmark) Nikolaj Juhl Petersen
- 42 (Denmark) Mathias Bitsch

=== Transfers ===
Transfers for the season 2026-27

Joining

- (Denmark) Jonas Fuglsbjerg (LB) from (Denmark) Grindsted GIF Håndbold
- (Denmark) Oliver Hamann-Boeriths (LW) from (Norway) Kristiansand Topphåndball
- (Denmark) Marius Elgaard (LB) from (Denmark) BSH U19
- (Norway) Sigurd Nordjordet Villadsen (P) from (Denmark) BSH U19

Leaving

- (Denmark) Laurits Hoffmann (LW) to (Norway) Halden Topphåndball
- (Denmark) Bertram Simonsen (CB) to (Iceland) Þór Akureyri
- (Denmark) Nicolai Pugholm Hvid (P) retires

== Notable former players ==
- Nicolaj Øris Nielsen
- Klaus Thomsen
- Jannick Green
- Heino Holm Knudsen
- Søren Nørgård
- Rasmus Porup
- Joakim Hykkerud
- Andreas Holst
