= Sydjysk Sparekasse Skansen =

Handball arena in Sønderborg, Denmark

Broager Sparekasse Skansen
- Skansen
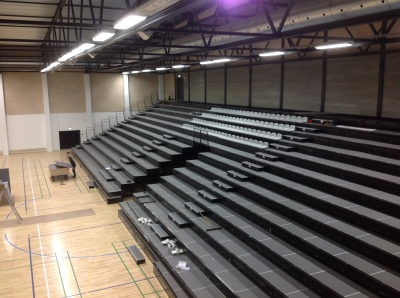
- Interactive map of Broager Sparekasse Skansen
- Full name: Broager Sparekasse Skansen
- Location: Sønderborg, Denmark
- Coordinates: 54.9111°N 9.7697°E
- Capacity: 2000

Construction
- Built: 2012

Tenant
- SønderjyskE

Broager Sparekasse Skansen is a handball arena in Sønderborg, in Sønderjylland, which is primarily used for SønderjyskE handball home matches. The arena has a fixed stand with 1000 seats, as well as a long side stand that can be pulled out during handball matches, also with 1000 seats, so the arena has a total capacity of 2000 seats. The arena was built in 2012 in order to replace both Dybbølhallhallene and Humlehøjhallen arenas where they previously played their home matches. The arena is named after Broager Sparekasse which is a local bank that has financed a large part of the arena expenses.

== Website ==
- Official homepage in Danish
