= Danish 1st Division (handball) =

Danish handball league

- men's league logo women's league logo
- Founded: 1946; 80 years ago
- No. of teams: 12 (women); 14 (men)
- Country: Denmark
- Most recent champions: HØJ Elite (women); HØJ Elite (men)
- Promotion to: Danish Women's Handball League; Danish Handball League
- Relegation to: 2nd Division
- Website: Women 1st division Men 1st division
- 2024-25 (women)

1st Division is the name of the second highest handball league for both genders. The top-ranking teams each wins promotion to Damehåndboldligaen and Danish Handball League, while the bottom finishers get relegated to the Danish 2nd Divisions. The men's division consists of 14 teams that meet each opponent once away and once at home, while the women's division consists of 12 teams.

When the first Danish national league system was created in 1946, 1. division was the top league, but with the creation of the Herrehåndboldligaen and Damehåndboldligaen in 1998, it was relegated to 2nd tier.

== Promotion to the League ==
=== Women ===
In Promotion to the Danish Women's Handball League is the winner of the 1st division ensures direct promotion to the league while no. 2 from the 1st division is playing against no. 11 from Women's Handball League and no. 10 from the 1st division is playing against no. 10 from Women's Handball League. Playing 1 home and 1 away about promotion.

=== Men ===
In promotion to the Danish Handball League is the winner of the 1st division ensures direct promotion to the league while number 2-4 is playing a playoff against number 9-13 from Danish Handball League. The 8 teams will be divided into two groups and play two matches against each other, one at home and one away. Number 1-2 is promoted while number 3 from each group is playing against each other. The winner is promoted with the 4 other teams

== Relegation ==
After the season the teams finishing in 12th, 13th and 14th are relegated to the second division, while the teams in 10th and 11th has to play qualification matches against teams from the 2. division in order to survive.

However, 2nd teams of top league or first division teams cannot gain promotion to the 1st division. So, if a 2nd team has won its second division pool (there are three pools in the 2nd division), the number of relegated teams are reduced. The playoff sports (No. 10 and 11 by default) are moved corresponding downward.

The playoff-bound teams each face a team from the second division. The first match played in the second division side's home ground, the return game is played at the 1st divisions ground. The team with the greater goal difference after the two matches played, will play the following season in the first division.

== Current Season (2024/2025) ==
Herrer (Men)	Damer (Women)
Aarhus Håndbold Herrer	Ajax København
Elitesport Vendsyssel	AGF Håndbold
FIF	DHG Håndbold
Norddjurs Håndbold	Randers HK
HC Midtjylland	Ejstrup/Hærvejen HK
HC Odense	Rødovre HK
HØJ Elite	Gudme HK
Roskilde Håndbold	Holstebro Håndbold
Fåborg ØH	HØJ Elite
Odder Håndbold	Roskilde Håndbold
Rækker Mølle Håndbold	Søndermarkens IK
Skive fH	TMS Ringsted
Team Sydhavsøerne	
TM Tønder	

== See also ==
- Handball
- Danish Women's Handball League
- Danish Handball League
