= 2024–25 Håndboldligaen =

Season of the Danish Handball League

Håndboldligaen
- Season: 2024–25
- Dates: 3 September 2024 - 7 June 2025
- Champion: Aalborg Håndbold
- Relegated: KIF Kolding
- Champions League: Aalborg Håndbold, GOG
- European League: Skanderborg AGF Håndbold, Fredericia HK
- Matches played: 182
- Goals scored: 13,586 (74.65 per match)
- Top goalscorer: Nicolaj Jørgensen (275 goals)

The 2024–25 Håndboldligaen was the 89th season of the Danish Handball League, the top men's handball league in Denmark. A total of fourteen teams contested this season's league. Grindsted GIF Håndbold was promoted from the 1st Division, for the first time in club history.

Aalborg Håndbold won the regular season. KIF Kolding were relegated, when they finished last in the regular season. This was their first relegation in 41 years. Aalborg Håndbold won the title when they beat Skjern Håndbold in the final 2-0 in matches.

GOG Håndbold qualified for the EHF Champions League, after Aalborg Håndbold won both the regular season and the championship, as the qualification therefore went to the second placed team in the regular season. After the season Skjern Håndbold appealed GOG's qualification to the EHF Champions League, claiming that since they reached the final, they were entitled to Denmark's second spot in the tournament. Danish Handball Federation later denied the appeal.

== Teams ==
Locations of the 2024–25 Håndboldligaen

=== Arenas and locations ===
The following 14 clubs competed in the Håndboldligaen during the 2023–24 season:

Team	City	Arena	Capacity
Aalborg Håndbold	Aalborg	Sparekassen Danmark Arena	5,000
Bjerringbro-Silkeborg Håndbold	Silkeborg	Jysk Arena	3.900
Fredericia HK	Fredericia	thansen Arena	2.700
GOG Håndbold	Gudme	Phønix Tag Arena	2.645
TMS Ringsted	Ringsted	Ringsted-Hallen	1.600
KIF Håndbold	Kolding	Sydbank Arena	4.500
Grindsted GIF Håndbold	Grindsted	Lynghallen	700
Mors-Thy Håndbold	Nykøbing Mors; Thisted	Sparekassen Thy Arena Mors; Thyhallen	1.500; 1.336
Nordsjælland Håndbold	Helsinge; Helsingør; Hillerød	Helsinge Hallerne; Helsingørhallen; Royal Stage Hillerød	1.500; 2.400; 3.040
Ribe-Esbjerg	Esbjerg; Ribe	Blue Water Dokken; Ribe Fritidscenter	3.570; 2.000
Skanderborg Aarhus Håndbold	Aarhus; Skanderborg	Ceres Arena; Fælledhallen	4.700; 1.790
Skjern Håndbold	Skjern	Skjern Bank Arena	2.400
SønderjyskE	Sønderborg	Broager Sparekasse Skansen	2.200
TTH Holstebro	Holstebro	Gråkjær Arena	3.250

== Regular season ==
=== League table ===
Pos	Team	Pld	W	D	L	GF	GA	GD	Pts	Qualification or relegation
1	Aalborg Håndbold	26	22	1	3	859	754	+105	45	Championship Play-Off
2	GOG	26	17	3	6	807	776	+31	37	Championship Play-Off
3	Fredericia HK	26	16	2	8	784	718	+66	34	Championship Play-Off
4	Mors-Thy Håndbold	26	12	8	6	837	791	+46	32	Championship Play-Off
5	Skanderborg Aarhus Håndbold	26	14	3	9	774	760	+14	31	Championship Play-Off
6	Bjerringbro-Silkeborg	26	13	4	9	789	781	+8	30	Championship Play-Off
7	Team Tvis Holstebro	26	13	3	10	833	799	+34	29	Championship Play-Off
8	Skjern Håndbold	26	12	4	10	805	753	+52	28	Championship Play-Off
9	SønderjyskE	26	9	4	13	767	770	−3	22	
10	TMS Ringsted	26	10	2	14	804	841	−37	22	
11	Nordsjælland Håndbold	26	9	1	16	773	799	−26	19	
12	Ribe-Esbjerg HH	26	5	3	18	739	782	−43	13	
13	Grindsted GIF Håndbold	26	4	4	18	694	800	−106	12	
14	KIF Kolding	26	2	6	18	694	835	−141	10	Relegated

Rules for classification: 1) points; 2) Goal difference; 3) Goals scored.

Grindsted GIF Håndbold was awarded a 10-0 win against Ribe-Esbjerg HH after REH had fielded an ineligible player in a match on 8 February 2025. The match ended 27-27 on the court.

== Second round ==
=== Championship round ===
==== Group 1 ====
Pos	Team	Pld	W	D	L	GF	GA	GD	Pts	Qualification
1	Aalborg Håndbold	6	5	1	0	182	158	+24	13 (Note: Aalborg Håndbold were added two point for in honoration of the Regular season's standings.)	Advance to playoffs
2	Skjern Håndbold	6	2	2	2	181	176	+5	6	Advance to playoffs
3	Skanderborg Aarhus Håndbold	6	2	1	3	180	192	−12	5	
4	Mors-Thy Håndbold	6	0	2	4	189	206	−17	3 (Note: Mors-Thy Håndbold were added one point for in honoration of the Regular season's standings.)	

Source: Dansk Håndbold
Rules for classification: 1) points; 2) head-to-head points; 3) goal difference; 4) goals scored; 5) head-to-head goal difference; 6) head-to-head number of goals scored.

==== Group 2 ====
Pos	Team	Pld	W	D	L	GF	GA	GD	Pts	Qualification
1	GOG	6	4	1	1	176	176	0	11 (Note: GOG were added two point for in honoration of the Regular season's standings.)	Advance to Playoffs
2	Team Tvis Holstebro	6	3	2	1	183	177	+6	8	Advance to Playoffs
3	Bjerringbro-Silkeborg	6	2	1	3	183	181	+2	5	
4	Fredericia HK	6	1	0	5	171	179	−8	3 (Note: Fredericia HK were added one point for in honoration of the Regular season's standings.)	

Source: Dansk Håndbold
Rules for classification: 1) points; 2) head-to-head points; 3) goal difference; 4) goals scored; 5) head-to-head goal difference; 6) head-to-head number of goals scored.

=== Relegation round ===
==== Group stage ====
Pos	Team	Pld	W	D	L	GF	GA	GD	Pts	Qualification or relegation
9	SønderjyskE Håndbold	4	2	1	1	114	107	+7	7 (Note: SønderjyskE Håndbold were added two point for in honoration of the Regular season's standings.)	
10	Ribe-Esbjerg HH	4	3	0	1	112	97	+15	7 (Note: Ribe-Esbjerg HH were added one point for in honoration of the Regular season's standings.)	
11	Nordsjælland Håndbold	4	2	1	1	102	101	+1	6 (Note: Nordsjælland Håndbold were added one point for in honoration of the Regular season's standings.)	
12	TMS Ringsted	4	0	1	3	110	124	−14	3 (Note: TMS Ringsted were added two point for in honoration of the Regular season's standings.)	
13	Grindsted GIF Håndbold	4	1	1	2	113	122	−9	3	Relegation play-offs

Source: tophåndbold.dk
Rules for classification: 1) points; 2) head-to-head points; 3) goal difference; 4) goals scored; 5) head-to-head goal difference; 6) head-to-head number of goals scored.

== Playoffs ==
=== Promotion/relegation play-offs ===
The second and third placed team in the 1st Division meet in a play off, where the winner meet the loser from the liga relegation round. The Winner is playing in the 2025–26 Håndboldligaen and the loser in the 2025-26 1st Division.

Date			Home team in 1st and 3rd match	Home team in 2nd match	Result			
1. match	2. match	3. match	Home team in 1st and 3rd match	Home team in 2nd match	Agg.	1. match	2. match	3. match
17.05	21.05	25.05	Grindsted GIF Håndbold	Skive fH	95-87	32-31	37-29	27-26

! Best of three matches. In the case of a tie after the second match, a third match is played. Highest ranking team in the regular season has the home advantage in the first and possible third match.

=== Championship semifinals ===
Semifinals were played best-of-three format. Highest ranking team in the regular season plays at home in the second match.

Date			Home team in 1st match and 3rd match	Home team in 2nd match	Result			
1. match	2. match	3. match	Home team in 1st match and 3rd match	Home team in 2nd match	Agg.	1. match	2. match	3. match
25.05	28.05	31.05	GOG	Skjern Håndbold	78-85	25-19	27-38	26-28
25.05	28.05	31.05	Aalborg	TTH Holstebro	65-54	28-23	37-31	

! Best of three matches. In the case of a tie after the second match, a third match is played. Highest ranking team in the regular season has the home advantage in the first and possible third match.

=== Third place match ===
The third place games were played best-of-three format.

Date			Home team in 1st match and 3rd match	Home team in 2nd match	Result			
1. match	2. match	3. match	Home team in 1st match and 3rd match	Home team in 2nd match	Agg.	1. match	2. match	3. match
04.06	07.06	11.06	GOG	TTH Holstebro	99-92	28-30	33-32	38-30

! Best of three matches. In the case of a tie after the second match, a third match is played. Highest ranking team in the regular season has the home advantage in the first and possible third match.

=== Championship match ===
The Championship games were played best-of-three format.

Date			Home team in 1st match and 3rd match	Home team in 2nd match	Result			
1. match	2. match	3. match	Home team in 1st match and 3rd match	Home team in 2nd match	Agg.	1. match	2. match	3. match
04.06	07.06	11.06	Aalborg Håndbold	Skjern	55-48	26-22	29-26	

! Best of three matches. In the case of a tie after the second match, a third match is played. Highest ranking team in the regular season has the home advantage in the first and possible third match.

== Statistics ==
=== Top goalscorers ===
==== Regular season ====
Rank	Name	Club	Goals
1	(Denmark) Nicolaj Jørgensen	SønderjyskE	239
2	(France) Noah Gaudin	Skjern Håndbold	165
3	(Norway) Tobias Grøndahl	GOG	151
4	(Norway) William Aar	TTH Holstebro	145
5	(Denmark) Marcus Midtgaard	Mors-Thy Håndbold	143
6	(Denmark) Tobias Nielsen	TMS Ringsted	136
6	(Denmark) Morten Hempel Jensen	Skanderborg Aarhus	136
8	(Denmark) Kristoffer Vestergaard	Grindsted	134
9	(Denmark) Carl-Emil Haunstrup	Nordsjælland Håndbold	133
9	(Sweden) Edwin Aspenbäck	TTH Holstebro	133

==== Full season ====
Rank	Name	Club	Goals
1	(Denmark) Nicolaj Jørgensen	SønderjyskE	275
2	(Norway) Tobias Grøndahl	GOG	230
3	(France) Noah Gaudin	Skjern Håndbold	216
4	(Norway) William Aar	TTH Holstebro	205
5	(Denmark) Marcus Midtgaard	Mors-Thy Håndbold	176
6	(Portugal) Joaquim Nazaré	Skjern Håndbold	175
7	(Denmark) Morten Hempel Jensen	Skanderborg Aarhus	168
8	(Denmark) Frederik Tilsted	GOG	162
8	(Denmark) Thomas Damgaard	TTH Holstebro	162
10	(Denmark) Tobias Nielsen	TMS Ringsted	133

=== Goalkeepers ===
Best goalkeepers (Min. 10 matches)
Rank	Name	Team	Saves (penalty saves)	Save %	Matches
1	(Denmark) Niklas Landin Jacobsen	Aalborg Håndbold	230 (21)	32,0	28
2	(Denmark) Christoffer Bonde	Skjern Håndbold	417 (14)	31,1	37
3	(Denmark) Sebastian Frandsen	Fredericia HK	141 (6)	31,0	25
4	(Denmark) Thorsten Fries	Fredericia HK	158 (21)	30,6	21
5	(Denmark) Magnus Kjærsgaard Petersen	Nordsjælland Håndbold	234 (4)	30,4	30
6	(Norway) Sander Heieren	Team Tvis Holstebro	293 (11)	31,6	30
7	(Denmark) Mikkel Løvkvist	Bjerringbro-Silkeborg	234 (16)	30,2	27
8	(Sweden) Fabian Norsten	Aalborg Håndbold	196 (7)	29,4	36
9	(Sweden) Peter Johannesson	GOG	219 (12)	29,4	37
10	(Denmark) Jimmi Andersen	Nordsjælland Håndbold	138 (8)	29,3	28
Source: tophaandbold.dk, Updated: 30 June 2025

=== All Star team ===
==== Regular season ====
The all-star team was announced on 16 April 2025.

Position	Player	Club
Goalkeeper	(Denmark) Christoffer Bonde	Skjern Håndbold
Left wing	(Denmark) Martin Bisgaard	Fredericia HK
Left back	(France) Noah Gaudin	Skjern Håndbold
Centre back	(Denmark) Nicolaj Jørgensen	SønderjyskE
Pivot	(Denmark) Andreas Søgaard	Ribe-Esbjerg HH
Right back	(Sweden) Edwin Aspenbäck	TTH Holstebro
Right wing	(Denmark) Tobias Nielsen	Ribe-Esbjerg HH

==== Coach of the season ====
(Iceland) Arnor Atlason - TTH Holstebro

== See also ==
- 2024 Danish Cup
- 2024–25 1st Division
