= 2002–03 Håndboldligaen (men's handball) =

Danish Handball League
- Season: 2002–03
- Champions: KIF Kolding 9th title
- Relegated: Viborg HK
- EHF Champions League: Skjern Håndbold, KIF Kolding
- EHF Cup: Aarhus GF, AAB Håndbold
- EHF Cup Winners' Cup: GOG
- EHF Challenge Cup: FCK Håndbold
- Matches: 164
- Goals: 8,891 (54.21 per match)
- Top goalscorer: (Denmark) Lars Rasmussen (179 goals)
- Average attendance: 1,037

The 2002–03 Danish Handball League season was the 67th edition of the Danish Handball League. KIF Kolding were the defending champions.

KIF Kolding won the title for a third year in a row, when they beat Skjern Håndbold in the finals. KIF Kolding won the regular season. Viborg HK were relegated.

== League table ==
The regular season was a double round robin. The 4 best teams qualified for the championship playoff, while the last-placed team was relegated. The 12th and 11th place met in a relegation play-off. The rest qualified for the next season. The loser of the relegation play-off played the winner of the 1st Division in a play-off, where the winner was promoted to the 2003-04 Håndboldligaen.

=== Regular season ===
	Team	P	W	D	L	G+	G−	Pts
1	KIF Kolding	24	18	4	2	750	615	40
2	GOG Håndbold	24	18	1	5	729	602	37
3	Skjern Håndbold	24	18	1	5	674	588	37
4	AAB Håndbold	24	15	1	8	667	616	31
5	Aarhus GF	24	14	1	9	676	675	39
6	FCK Håndbold	24	12	1	11	635	631	25
7	Elite 3000	24	10	2	12	672	673	22
8	Bjerringbro FH	24	10	1	13	602	626	21
9	Team Tvis Holstebro	24	9	2	13	615	657	20
10	Ajax Farum	24	8	3	13	645	682	19
11	Fredericia HK	24	8	1	15	610	664	17
12	Otterup HK	24	4	1	19	610	664	9
13	Viborg HK	24	1	0	21	576	684	2

Champion Playoff
Relegation Playoff
Relegation

=== Championship Round ===
The championship round was played with two semifinals; one between the 1st and 4th placed and one between the 2nd and 3rd placed teams.

== Semifinals ==
Teams	Result
KIF Kolding – AaB	33–20
AaB – KIF Kolding	26–27

Teams	Result
GOG – Skjern Håndbold	32–26
Skjern Håndbold – GOG	32–31
GOG – Skjern Håndbold	31–32

=== Finals ===
Teams	Result
KIF Kolding – Skjern Håndbold	30–27
Skjern Håndbold – KIF Kolding	28–27
KIF Kolding – Skjern Håndbold	34–33

== Top scorers ==
Topscorere i grundspillet
#	Name	Team	Goals	Matches
1	Lars Rasmussen	Ajax København	179	24
2	Hans Lindberg	Elite 3000 Helsingør	175	24
3	Micke Næsby	Fredericia HK	160	23
4	Lasse Boesen	KIF Kolding	156	24
5	Paw Peters	Fredericia HK	125	23
6	Dennis Kirkegaard	Team Tvis Holstebro	123	24
7	Jesper Monrad	Elite 3000 Helsingør	122	23
7	Thomas Mogensen	Viborg HK	122	24
9	Michael V. Knudsen	Skjern Håndbold	121	23
10	Torben Vinther	Århus Håndbold	119	24
source: dhf.dk
