= Peter Henriksen =

Danish handball player (born 1972)

Personal information
- Nationality: Danish
- Born: 20 August 1972 (age 54) København, Denmark
- Height: 1.84 m (6 ft 0 in)

Sport
- Sport: Handball
- Position: Goalkeeper
- Current club: Retired

Youth career
- Years: Team
- –: Holte

Senior clubs
- Years: Team
- –: Helsingør IF
- -1998: Ajax København
- 1998-1999: VfL Gummersbach
- 1999-2001: Virum-Sorgenfri Håndboldklub
- 2001-2010: GOG
- 2011-2012: Fredericia HK
- 2012: AG København
National team
Years	Team	Apps	(Gls)
1997-2008	Denmark	71	(0)

Teams managed
- 2026-: KIF Kolding (GK Coach)
Medal record
Representing Denmark
Men's handball
World Championships
Bronze medal – third place	2007 Germany	Team competition
European Championships
Gold medal – first place	2008 Norway	Team competition

Peter Henriksen (born 20 August 1972) is a former Danish team handball player (goalkeeper) and current coach. He is European Champion by winning the 2008 European Men's Handball Championship with the Danish national handball team. He also received a bronze medal at the 2007 World Men's Handball Championship. As of 2026 he is the goalkeeping coach at KIF Kolding.

== Club career ==
Henriksen started playing handball at the age of 8. He played for numerous clubs in Northern Sjælland before moving to German handball with VfL Gummersbach in 1998. In 1999 he returned to Denmark to join Virum-Sorgenfri Håndboldklub From 2001 to 2010 he played for GOG Svendborg TGI, where he is considered a club legend. With GOG he won the Danish Championship in 2004 and 2007 and the Danish Cup in 2003, 2004 and 2006. In the 2004-05 he was named the best goalkeeper in the Danish League. Henriksen then joined Fredericia Håndboldklub, who he signed for when GOG went bankrupt in 2010. In 2011 he retired, but he returned to handball in March 2012, when he joined AG København to replace the injured Steiner Ege. Here he won the Danish Championship and Cup in 2012.

== National team ==
Henriksen was part of the Danish team that won silver at the 1993 World Junior Championship. He debuted for the senior national team in 1997. He was however often second choice to various other anish goalkeepers. He missed the 2005 World Championship due to injury, and was not selected for the 2006 European Championship.

He returned to the Danish national team for the 2007 World Championship, where Denmark won bronze medals. During the tournament he was the second choice behind Kasper Hvidt. In 2008 he won the European Men's Handball Championship. The same year he participated in the 2008 Olympics, where Denmark finished 7th.

== Coaching career ==
In 2026 he became the goalkeeping coach at KIF Kolding.
