= Jérôme Cazal =

French handball player (born 1973)

Personal information
- Full name: Jérôme Bolvig Cazal
- Nationality: French (France)
- Born: 2 November 1973 (age 52) Saint-Céré
- Height: 189 cm (74 in)

Sport
- Sport: Handball
- Position: Goalkeeper
- Number: 16

Jérôme Cazal (born 2 November 1973) is a French former handballer, who played as a goalkeeper for Danish Handball League side Nordsjælland Håndbold. He has previously played for league rivals FCK Håndbold and Virum-Sorgenfri HK. In both FCK and Virum-Sorgenfri he was partnered with Peter Nørklit.

In 2010 he left Nordsjælland Håndbold and joined Frederiksberg IF at the age of 36.

Today he is part of the board at the Danish amateur club Herlev/Hjorten Håndbold.

== Teams ==
- (Denmark) Virum-Sorgenfri HK
- (Sweden) H 43 Lund
- (Germany) TuS N-Lübbecke
- (Germany) Eintracht Hildesheim
- (Denmark) FCK Håndbold
- (Denmark) Nordsjælland Håndbold
- (Denmark) Frederiksberg IF
