= Sofie Bloch-Sørensen =

Danish handball player (born 1986)

Personal information
- Nationality: Danish
- Born: 19 May 1986 (age 40) Frederiksberg, Denmark
- Height: 1.80 m (5 ft 11 in)

Sport
- Sport: Handball
- Position: Left back
- Current club: Retired

Senior clubs
- Years: Team
- 2004-2010: FC København Håndbold
- 2007-2008: Team Eslövs IK on loan (Sweden)
- 2010-2012: SK Århus
- 2012-2013: Frederiksberg IF
- 2013-2014: FC København Håndbold
National team
Years	Team	Apps	(Gls)
2010-2012	Denmark	15	(5)
- Updated on January 2024

Sofie Bloch-Sørensen (born 19 May 1986) is a Danish former handball player for Frederiksberg IF, SK Århus and FC København Håndbold and the Danish national team.
