= 2003–04 Håndboldligaen (men's handball) =

Danish Handball League
- Season: 2003–04
- Champions: GOG 10th title
- Relegated: Otterup HK, Ajax København
- EHF Champions League: Håndbold, KIF Kolding
- Top goalscorer: (Denmark) Micke Næsby (227 goals)

The 2003–04 Danish Handball League season was the 68th edition of the Danish Handball League. KIF Kolding were the defending champions.

GOG won the title, when they beat KIF Kolding in the finals. KIF Kolding won the regular season. Otterup HK and Ajax København were relegated.

== League table ==
The regular season was a double round robin. The 4 best teams qualified for the championship playoff, while the last-placed team was relegated. The rest qualified for the relegation playoff.

=== Regular season ===
	Team	P	W	D	L	G+	G−	Pts
1	KIF Kolding	26	23	2	1	866	717	48
2	GOG Håndbold	26	20	2	4	910	715	42
3	AAB Håndbold	26	17	4	5	744	676	38
4	Skjern Håndbold	26	17	0	9	783	680	34
5	FCK Håndbold	26	14	2	10	708	668	30
6	Team Tvis Holstebro	26	14	2	10	713	677	30
7	Aarhus GF	26	14	1	11	828	781	29
8	Bjerringbro FH	26	13	1	12	684	730	27
9	Fredericia HK	26	12	2	12	718	728	26
10	Elite 3000	26	10	1	15	727	772	21
11	Silkeborg-Voel KFUM	26	6	0	20	621	743	12
12	TMS Ringsted	26	5	1	20	621	743	11
13	Ajax København	26	4	1	21	620	745	9
14	Otterup HK	26	3	1	22	589	765	7

Champion Playoff
Relegation Playoff
Relegation

=== Championship Round ===
The championship round was played with two semifinals; one between the 1st and 4th placed and one between the 2nd and 3rd placed teams.

== Semifinals ==
Date	Teams	Result
1 May	KIF Kolding – Skjern Håndbold	31–29
8 May	Skjern Håndbold – KIF Kolding	27–30

Date	Teams	Result
1 May	GOG – AaB	35–33
8 May	AaB – GOG	31–35

=== Finals ===
Date	Teams	Result
15 May	KIF Kolding – GOG	36–43
20 May	GOG – KIF Kolding	34–34
