= Sara Eriksson =

Sara Eriksson may refer to:

- Sara Eriksson (footballer) (born 2003), Swedish footballer with Linköping FC
- Sara Eriksson (handballer) (born 1981), Swedish handballer
- Sara Eriksson (wrestler) (born 1974), Swedish wrestler

== See also ==
- Sara Erikson (fl. after 2003), American actress
