= Simon Hammer =

Danish handball player (born 1983)

Personal information
- Full name: Simon Hammer
- Nationality: Danish (Denmark)
- Born: 2 March 1983 (age 43) Rødding, Viborg Municipality, Denmark
- Height: 186 cm (73 in)

Sport
- Sport: Handball
- Position: Left winger
- Number: 6

Senior clubs
- Years: Team
- 2004: HF Mors
- 2002-2010: FCK Håndbold
- 2010-?: Frederiksberg IF

Simon Hammer (born 2 March 1983) is a Danish handball player. He grew up in Rødding, Viborg Municipality, but switched to the Copenhagen-based club FCK when he was 19. He has previously played for another league side HF Mors, and joined FCK Håndbold at the age of 19.

Until 2005 he played part time for the club while studying at Niels Brocks Handelsskole. He played professionally full time for a short while, but according to himself he was bored with the lack of working hours, and thus starting working in banking simultaneously with the handball career.

In 2010 he won the Danish cup with FCK Håndbold, when they beat Bjerringbro-Silkeborg 31–30 in the final. He then joined Frederiksberg IF.
