= Mikkel Holm Aagaard =

Danish handball player (born 1976)

Mikkel Aagaard
Personal information
- Full name: Mikkel Holm Aagaard
- Nationality: Danish
- Born: 26 November 1979 (age 46) Copenhagen, Denmark
- Height: 1.89 m (6 ft 2 in)

Sport
- Sport: Handball
- Position: Left wing

Senior clubs
- Years: Team
- –: Frederiksberg IF
- -2001: Virum-Sorgenfri HK
- 2001-2002: Team Helsinge
- 2002-2003: Bjerringbro HK
- 2003: CB Torrevieja
- 2003-2007: Skjern Håndbold
- 2007: Bidasoa Irún
- 2007-2010: Viborg HK
National team
Years	Team	Apps	(Gls)
2000-2008	Denmark	59	(107)
Medal record
Men's Handball
European Championships
Bronze medal – third place	2006 Switzerland	Team
Gold medal – first place	2008 Norway	Team

Mikkel Holm Aagaard (born 26 November 1979) is a Danish former handball player, who played as left winger. He was part of the Danish team that won the 2008 European Champion for the first time in history.

== Club career ==
He started playing handball at FIF before joining Virum-Sorgenfri HK and Team Helsinge. From January 2002 to January 2003 he played for Bjerringbro HK, before joining CB Torrevieja in Spain for half a season.

From 2003 to 2007 he played for Skjern Håndbold, before joining Bidasoa Irún from March 2007 until the end of season. His last club was Viborg HK, where he played from 2007 to 2010. He retired in 2010 due to injuries.

He debuted for the Danish national team on 22 June 2000 against Croatia. played 59 games for the Danish national team, scoring 107 goals.
