= Jørgen Heidemann =

Danish handball player (born 1946)

Jørgen D. Heidemann (born March 27, 1946) is a Danish former handball player who competed in the 1972 Summer Olympics. In total he played 89 games for the Danish national team, scoring 183 goals.

He played his club handball with Fredericia KFUM, and was the top goalscorer of the club in the 1969 Danish Handball League season. In 1976 he reached the final of the European Cup with the club, but lost to Borac Banja Luka in the final.

He debuted for the Danish national team in December 1967 in a match against Norway. In 1972 he was part of the Danish team which finished thirteenth in the Olympic tournament. He played all five matches and scored eight goals.
