= Michael Berg =

Michael Berg may refer to:

- Michael Berg (activist) (born 1945), American activist and politician
- Michael Berg (screenwriter), American screenwriter
- Michael Jørn Berg (born 1955), Danish handball player
- Michael Berg, main character in the 1995 Bernhard Schlink novel The Reader and 2008 film adaptation
