= Jesper Monrad =

Danish handball player and coach (born 1976)

Personal information
- Full name: Jesper Monrad
- Nationality: Danish (Denmark)
- Born: 18 October 1976 (age 50)
- Height: 183 cm (72 in)

Sport
- Sport: Handball
- Position: Back / Playmaker

Senior clubs
- Years: Team
- –: Frederiksberg IF
- –: Elite 3000 Helsingør
- ??-2017: FCK Håndbold
- 2017-??: TMS Ringsted

Teams managed
- –: Holte IF
- 2011- ??: Frederiksberg IF
- ??-2017: Frederiksberg IF Sporting Director

Jesper Monrad (born 18 October 1976) is a Danish former handball player and coach. He has previously played for Danish Handball League sides Frederiksberg IF, TMS Ringsted and FCK Håndbold.

In 2011 he was the coach of 1st division side Holte IF. They were relegated, but Monrad was praised for his work anyway. This prompted his former club Frederiksberg IF to sign him as the head coach for the 2011/12 season. Later he became the sporting director at the club.
