= Mads Lind =

Danish handball player (born 1980)

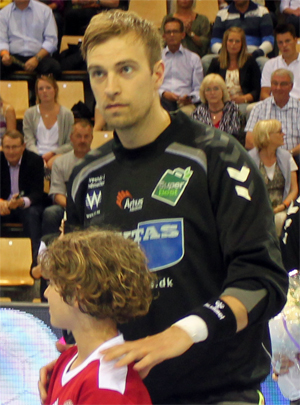
- Mads Lind, retired Danish handballer

Personal information
- Full name: Mads Lind
- Nationality: Danish (Denmark)
- Born: 7 July 1980 (age 46) Aarhus, Denmark
- Height: 195 cm (77 in)

Sport
- Sport: Handball
- Position: Line player

Youth career
- Years: Team
- –: Vejlby-Risskov

Senior clubs
- Years: Team
- 2001-2015: Aarhus GF/Århus Håndbold

Mads Lind (born 7 July 1980) is a Danish retired handballer, who played for Danish Handball League side Aarhus GF and Århus Håndbold. He played for the club since its founding in 2001 until the new professional merger that founded the new Århus Håndbold club.

Mads was captain for Århus Håndbold until he retired from professional handball in 2015. When he retired he had both the club record for most matches with 321 and most goals with 850.

In 2011 the Danish club Aalborg Håndbold sued him for breaching his contract, claiming that he had signed a two-year contract with the club, which he did not intend to fulfill. Aalborg Håndbold dropped the case two weeks later.

In 2002, Lind was issued a two-year ban from handball after testing positive for the use of anabolic steroids. It was the first doping case in Danish handball.

In 2021 he became the sporting director at Skanderborg Aarhus Håndbold, a club created in a fusion involving his former club Aarhus GF.
