= Jan Pytlick =

Danish handball coach (born 1967)

Personal information
- Full name: Jan Pytlick
- Nationality: Danish
- Born: 5 June 1967 (age 59) Thurø, Denmark
- Height: 1.80 m (5 ft 11 in)

Sport
- Sport: Handball

Teams managed
- Years: Team
- 1991–1995: GOG Women's team
- 1995–1997: Team Esbjerg
- 1997–1998: GOG Men's team
- 1998–2006: Denmark
- 2006–2007: GOG
- 2007–2014: Denmark
- 2015–2016: ŽRK Vardar
- 2016–2020: Odense Håndbold
- 2020–2022: SønderjyskE Håndbold
- 2022–2023: Saudi Arabia
Medal record
Coach for women's handball
Denmark
Olympic Games
Gold medal – first place	2004 Athens	Team
Gold medal – first place	2000 Sydney	Team
World Championship
Bronze medal – third place	2013 Serbia	Team
European Championship
Gold medal – first place	2002 Denmark	Team
Silver medal – second place	1998 Netherlands	Team
Silver medal – second place	2004 Hungary	Team

Jan Pytlick (born 5 June 1967) is a Danish handball coach, and trains Saudi Arabia national team. He was head coach for the Danish women's national handball team from 1998 to 2006, and again from 2007 to 2014. Pytlick has led the women's national team to victory in two Summer Olympics, as they became Olympic Champions in 2000, and again in 2004. After the team's flop at the 2014 European Women's Handball Championship, DHF and Pytlick agreed to end cooperation.

He is educated as a bricklayer. He played handball himself until he was forced to stop by injuries at the age of 19. This lead him to pursue a training career instead.

He was the coach of the Danish teams Team Esbjerg and GOG Handball, both in Women's handball and men's handball, before DHF suggested that he applied to become the Danish national coach. He rejected the idea initially, but decided to apply anyway.

His three children Simon Pytlick, Camilla Pytlick and Josephine Pytlick are all professional handball players, and so was his wife, Berit Bogetoft. His nephew Andreas Haagen Pytlick is also a professional handballer.

== The Danish Women's national team ==
He met success immediately in the position, when he won silver medals at the 1998 European Women's Handball Championship despite the fact, that recently a long list of established players had decided to retire.

He won back-to-back Olympic gold medals as well as gold at the 2002 European Women's Handball Championship and silver at the 2004 European Women's Handball Championship.

In 2005 he rejoined his former club GOG Håndbold. He did however not have much success, as the club finished the season in the middle of the table.

In February 2007 he was once again hired as the Denmark when Brian Lyngholm decided to withdraw. It was initially only ment to be a temporary return, but in March 2007 he decided to quit his GOG position to focus 100% on the national team. He signed a five-year agreement up to and including the 2012 Olympics. In the end he was the Danish national coach until 2014.

== After the Danish National Team ==
He returned to club Handball to coach Odense Håndbold, but was fired in 2019. He then joined SønderjyskE Håndbold, where he was given a three-year deal, but was fired in 2019 due to disappointing results. He had initially planned to retire after the SønderjyskE position, but was convinced to join the Saudi Arabia men's national handball team up and until the 2023 World Cup.

Sporting positions
Preceded by Ulrik Wilbek	Denmark women's national handball team head coach 1998–2005	Succeeded by Brian Lyngholm
Preceded by Brian Lyngholm	Denmark women's national handball team head coach 2007–2014	Succeeded by Klavs Bruun Jørgensen
