= Mads Kjeldgaard Andersen =

Danish handball player (born 1996)

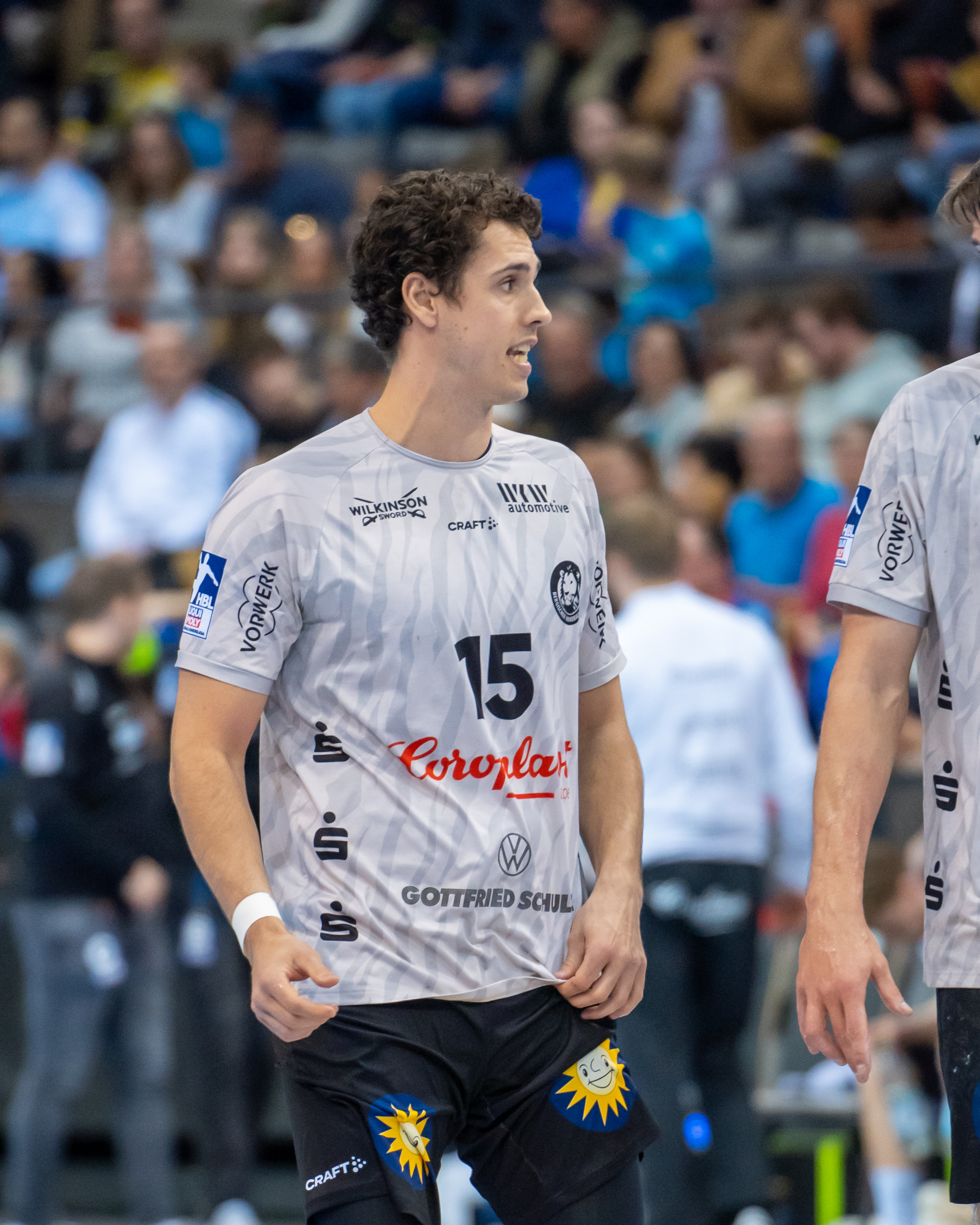
- Kjeldgaard in March 2024.

Personal information
- Nationality: Danish
- Born: 14 December 1996 (age 29) Nykøbing Mors, Denmark
- Height: 1.95 m (6 ft 5 in)

Sport
- Sport: Handball
- Position: Left back
- Current club: Fredericia HK
- Number: 15

Senior clubs
- Years: Team
- 2016–2019: Mors-Thy Håndbold
- 2019–2023: Bjerringbro-Silkeborg
- 2023–2024: Bergischer HC
- 2024–: Fredericia HK
Medal record
Junior World Championship
Silver medal – second place	2017 Algeria

Mads Kjeldgaard Andersen (born 14 December 1996) is a Danish handball player for Fredericia HK in the Danish Men's Handball League.

He represented Denmark at the 2017 Men's Junior World Handball Championship in Algeria, where the team claimed a silver medal.

In 2023, he signed a 3 year-contract with German Bundesliga team Bergischer HC. A year later, Kjeldgaard left the team due to its relegation for the 2. Handball-Bundesliga and economic situation.
