= Cazal =

Cazal is a French surname. Notable people with the surname include:

- Iván Cazal (born 1999), Paraguayan footballer
- Jérôme Cazal (born 1973), French handball player
- Louis Cazal (1901–1945), French footballer and manager
- Olivier Cazal (born 1962), French classical pianist
- Patrick Cazal (born 1971), French handball player
- Pierre Cazal (1948–2024), French literature professor and football historian

Cazal may also refer to Cazal Eyewear, a luxury sunglass brand.
