= Toni Røseler Andersen =

Danish handball player (born 1940)

Toni Dorthe Røseler Andersen née Røseler (born 29 July 1940) is a Danish former handball player. She was part of the Danish team that won silver medals at the 1962 World Women's Handball Championship in Romania. Røseler debuted for the national team in 1958 and would go on to play 60 matches, scoring 68 goals.

She reached the final of the 1962–63 Women's European Cup with Frederiksberg IF.

== Career medals ==
- 1959: DM Gold
- 1962: DM Gold
- 1964: Pokal Gold
- 1965: Pokal Gold
- 1966: DM Gold, Pokal Silver
- 1967: DM Gold, Pokal Silver
- 1968: DM Silver
- 1969: DM Silver, Pokal Gold
- 1970: DM Silver, Pokal Gold
- 1971: DM Gold
- 1972: DM Gold, Pokal Gold

== Personal life ==
Toni Røseler is married to the former Danish handball player Gert Andersen. They became parents to twins, Camilla and Charlotte of which the first mentioned became a handball player too. Toni Røselers father, Walter Røseler, was also a handball player, playing for Københavns Håndboldklub.
