= Trine Pedersen =

Danish handball player (born 1993)

Personal information
- Full name: Trine Dalgaard Fomsgaard Pedersen
- Nationality: Danish
- Born: 3 May 1993 (age 33) Horsens, Denmark
- Height: 1.70 m (5 ft 7 in)

Sport
- Sport: Handball
- Position: Centre back
- Current club: Odense Håndbold
- Number: 5

Senior clubs
- Years: Team
- 2010–2011: Horsens HK
- 2011–2014: Skanderborg Håndbold
- 2014–2015: Silkeborg-Voel KFUM
- 2015–2016: Fredericia HK
- 2016–2019: Skanderborg Håndbold
- 2019–2020: TTH Holstebro
- 2020–2021: HH Elite
- 2021–2023: Odense Håndbold

Trine Dalgaard Fomsgaard Pedersen (born 3 May 1993) is a Danish handball player who plays as centre back for Danish club Odense Håndbold in the Bambusa Kvindeligaen. She has previously played for Silkeborg-Voel KFUM, Skanderborg Håndbold and TTH Holstebro, played around 150 matches in the Damehåndboldligaen.

On 3 August 2021, it was announced that she had signed a 1-year contract with Odense Håndbold, from HH Elite.

== Achievements ==
- Danish Women's Handball Cup:
  - Silver Medalist: 2022
  - Bronze Medalist: 2019
