= Anne-Marie Nielsen =

Danish handball player and coach (born 1941)

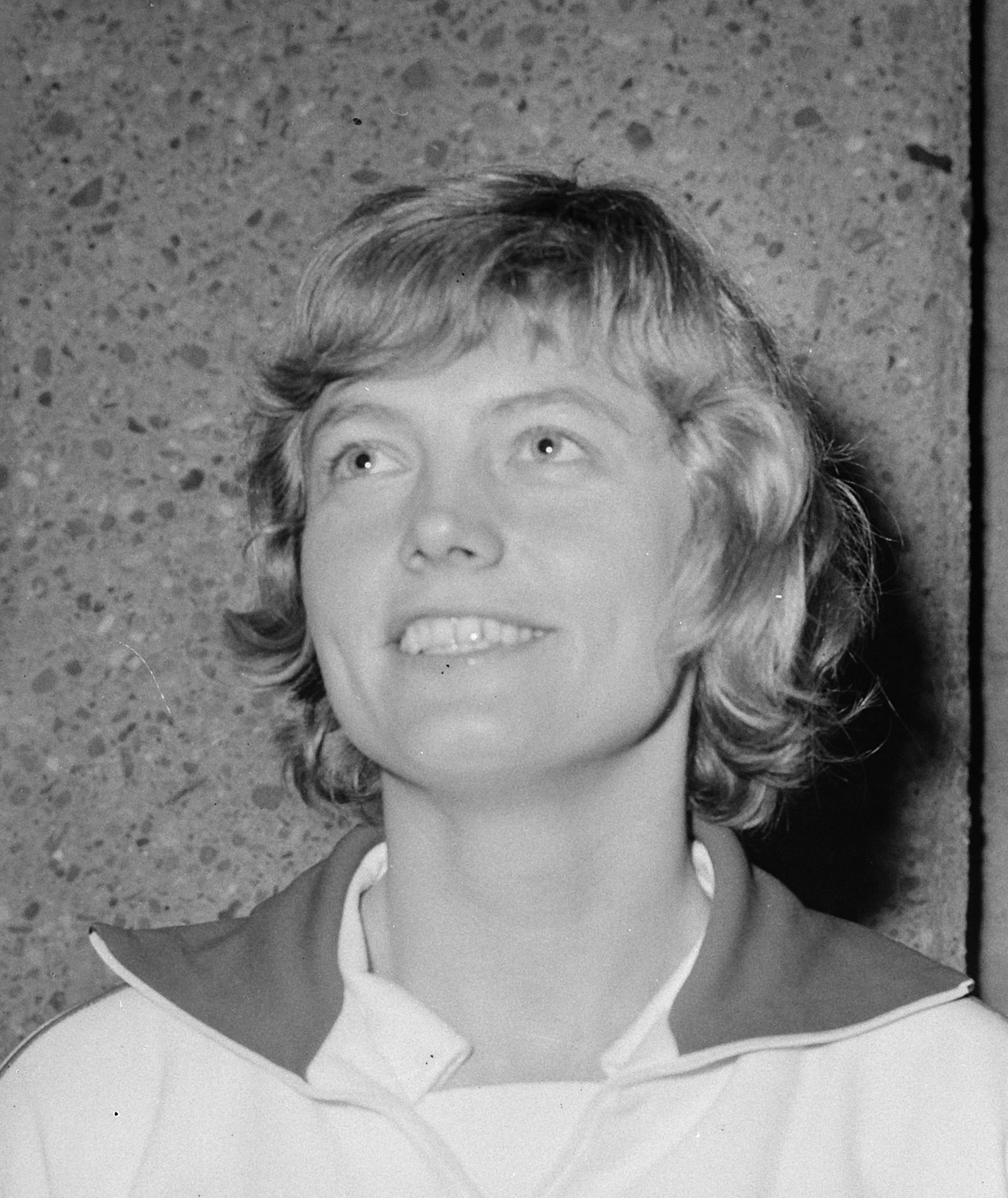
- Anne-Marie Nielsen in 1971

Personal information
- Nationality: Danish
- Born: 11 July 1941 (age 85) Odense, Denmark

Sport
- Sport: Handball

Senior clubs
- Years: Team
- –: Frederiksberg IF
National team
Years	Team	Apps	(Gls)
1959–1975	Denmark	180	(301)
Medal record
Representing Denmark
World Championships
Silver medal – second place	1962 Romania	Team
European Champions Cup
Silver medal – second place	1963 Prague	Team

Anne-Marie Nielsen (born 11 July 1941) is a Danish retired handball player and coach.

Between January 1959 and December 1975 she played 180 international matches and scored 301 goals. In 1971 she became the first player ever to reach 100 games for the Danish Women's National Team. She is to this day still the 11th most capped Danish player ever, even though she was active before the times where the European Women's Handball Championship was played, and before women's handball was an Olympic sport. From June 1960 to November 1973 she took part in all 133 matches of the national team, which remains the longest series in Danish history. Nielsen won silver medals at the 1962 World Championships and 1962–1963 European Champions Cup, as well as 10 national titles and 5 Danish cups. This is a record in Danish handball. At the 1965 World Women's Handball Championship she was the tournament top scorer.
