= Nick Rasmussen (handballer) =

Danish handball coach (born 1968)

Personal information
- Full name: Claes Nick Rasmussen
- Born: 6 December 1968 (age 57) Ringsted, Denmark

Sport
- Sport: Handball
- Position: Pivot
- Current club: Skanderborg AGF Håndbold

Senior clubs
- Years: Team
- 1984–2005: Fredericia HK
National team
Years	Team	Apps	(Gls)
1992	Denmark	1	(0)

Teams managed
- 2006–2007: Fredericia HK
- 2010–2011: Vejle Håndbold
- 2011–2014: Ribe-Esbjerg HH
- 2014–2017: Fredericia HK (youth)
- 2017–2021: Skanderborg Håndbold
- 2021–: Skanderborg AGF

Claes Nick Rasmussen (born 26 September 1968) is a Danish handball coach and former player, who is currently the head coach of Skanderborg AGF Håndbold.

He played 1 single match for the Danish national team in 1992 against the Netherlands.

== Career ==
As a player, he played his entire career for Fredericia HK, where he also had his first coaching position. He was fired after a season as the head coach, after he had publicly criticized the club leadership. He was later the head coach of Vejle Håndbold, followed by Ribe-Esbjerg HH. In 2012 helped Ribe-Esbjerg getting promoted to the Danish top division. In 2014 he was fired by Ribe-Esbjerg after failing to reach the Championship Play-off in the 2013-14 season.

In 2014 he returned to Fredericia HK as a youth coach.

In 2017 he became the head coach of Skanderborg Håndbold's men's team. In 2019 the team reached the final of the Danish Men's Handball Cup for the first time in club history. Here they would however lose to Aalborg Håndbold.

When the team fused their men's team with that of AGF Håndbold to become Skanderborg AGF Håndbold he was appointed to continue coaching the first team. In his first season he managed to qualify the team EHF European League. In the same season he was named Danish League coach of the year.

In the 2025-26 season he managed to get the team to the final the Danish Championship for the first time, where they once again lost to Aalborg Håndbold. For that accomplishment he was named Coach of the Year in Denmark. The same season he extended his contract with the club until 2028.

== Private ==
His daughter Thea Hamann Rasmussen is also a handball player.
