= 2008–09 Håndboldligaen (men's handball) =

Danish Handball League
- Season: 2008–09
- Champions: KIF Kolding 12th title
- Relegated: Ajax København
- EHF Champions League: FCK Håndbold, KIF Kolding
- EHF Cup: GOG, AaB
- Top goalscorer: (Sweden) Fredrik Petersen (171 goals)

The 2008–09 Danish Handball League season, officially known as CBB Mobil Ligaen for sponsorship reasons, was the 73rd edition of the Danish Handball League. FCK Håndbold were the defending champions.

KIF Kolding won the title, when they beat FCK Håndbold in the finals. AaB Håndbold won the regular season. Ajax København were relegated, when they finished last in the league table.

== League table ==
The regular season was a double round robin. The 8 best teams qualified for the championship playoff, while the last place was relegated. The rest qualified for the relegation playoff.

=== Regular season ===
| | Team | P | W | D | L | G+ | G− | Diff. | Pts |
|---|---|---|---|---|---|---|---|---|---|
| 1 | AaB Håndbold | 26 | 19 | 3 | 4 | 824 | 696 | +218 | 41 |
| 2 | FCK Håndbold | 26 | 20 | 0 | 6 | 841 | 740 | +101 | 40 |
| 3 | Bjerringbro-Silkeborg | 26 | 19 | 1 | 6 | 788 | 705 | +83 | 39 |
| 4 | KIF Kolding | 26 | 17 | 4 | 5 | 826 | 756 | +70 | 38 |
| 5 | Skjern Håndbold | 26 | 14 | 5 | 7 | 732 | 711 | +21 | 33 |
| 6 | Viborg HK | 26 | 15 | 0 | 11 | 766 | 729 | +37 | 30 |
| 7 | Team Tvis Holstebro | 26 | 13 | 3 | 10 | 776 | 744 | +32 | 29 |
| 8 | GOG Svendborg TGI | 26 | 11 | 3 | 12 | 778 | 751 | +27 | 25 |
| 9 | Aarhus Håndbold | 26 | 10 | 2 | 14 | 783 | 769 | +14 | 22 |
| 10 | Nordsjælland Håndbold | 26 | 10 | 1 | 15 | 637 | 694 | -57 | 21 |
| 11 | Fredericia HK | 26 | 7 | 1 | 18 | 692 | 770 | -78 | 15 |
| 12 | Mors-Thy Håndbold | 26 | 6 | 3 | 17 | 732 | 798 | -66 | 15 |
| 13 | TMS Ringsted | 26 | 5 | 1 | 20 | 674 | 822 | -148 | 11 |
| 14 | Ajax København | 26 | 2 | 1 | 23 | 654 | 818 | -164 | 5 |

| Champion Playoff |
| Relegation Playoff |
| Relegation |

=== Championship Round ===
The championship round was played in two groups of four. The winner of each group advanced to the championship finals. The second place advanced to the third place playoff.

==== Group 1 ====
| | Team | P | W | D | L | G+ | G− | Diff. | Pts |
|---|---|---|---|---|---|---|---|---|---|
| 1 | KIF Kolding | 6 | 4 | 1 | 1 | 190 | 190 | 0 | 10 |
| 2 | GOG | 6 | 4 | 1 | 1 | 201 | 169 | +32 | 9 |
| 3 | AaB | 6 | 3 | 0 | 3 | 188 | 179 | +9 | 8 |
| 4 | Viborg HK | 6 | 0 | 0 | 6 | 166 | 207 | -41 | 0 |

==== Group 2 ====
| | Team | P | W | D | L | G+ | G− | Diff. | Pts |
|---|---|---|---|---|---|---|---|---|---|
| 1 | FCK | 6 | 3 | 1 | 2 | 177 | 177 | 0 | 9 |
| 2 | TTH | 6 | 3 | 1 | 2 | 179 | 174 | +5 | 7 |
| 3 | Bjerringbro-Silkeborg | 6 | 3 | 0 | 3 | 166 | 168 | -2 | 7 |
| 4 | Skjern Håndbold | 6 | 2 | 0 | 4 | 175 | 178 | -3 | 4 |

| Championship Playoff |
| 3rd Place |

=== 3rd Place ===
| Date | Time | Teams | Result | Half Time Res. |
|---|---|---|---|---|
| 22 May | 19:30 | Team Tvis Holstebro – GOG | 29–27 | 13–11 |
| 27 May | 19:30 | GOG – Team Tvis Holstebro | 27–22 | 13–11 |
| 29 May | 19:30 | Team Tvis Holstebro – GOG | 34–26 | 18–11 |

==== Finals ====
| Date | Time | Teams | Result | Half Time Res. |
|---|---|---|---|---|
| 23 May | 16:15 | FCK – KIF Kolding | 34–32 | 17-17 |
| 30 May | 16:15 | KIF Kolding – FCK | 37–32 | 19-16 |
| 1 June | 16:00 | FCK – KIF Kolding | 27–31 | 15–15 |
