= Frida Jensen =

Danish handball player (born 1938)

Frida Helene Jensen (born 12 January 1938) is a Danish former national team player in team handball. She was part of the Danish team that won silver medals at the 1962 World Women's Handball Championship in Romania.

Frida Jensen started her playing career at Kolding IF. She debuted on the national team on 7 December 1958. She played 31 matches for the Danish team. She reached the final of the 1962–63 Women's European Cup with Frederiksberg IF. Additionally she won the Danish Women's Handball League three times and the Danish Women's Handball Cup two times with the club.

== Medals ==
- 1959: DM Gold
- 1962: DM Gold
- 1964: Pokal Gold
- 1965: Pokal Gold
- 1966: DM Gold, Pokal Silver
