= Monrad =

Monrad may refer to:

- Cally Monrad (1879–1950), Norwegian singer, actress and poet
- David Monrad Johansen (1888–1974), Norwegian composer
- Ditlev Gothard Monrad (1811–1887), Danish politician and bishop of Lolland-Falster
- I. H. Monrad Aas (born 1948), Norwegian researcher
- Jens Zetlitz Monrad Kielland (1866–1926), Norwegian architect
- Jesper Monrad (born 1976), Danish handballer
- Lars Monrad-Krohn (born 1933), Norwegian engineer and entrepreneur
- Martin Monrad (born 1977), male table tennis player from Denmark
- Monrad Metzgen (1894–1956), well known national hero of Belize having been a leading citizen in the Colony of British Honduras
- Monrad Norderval (1902–1976), Norwegian bishop
- Monrad Wallgren (1891–1961), American politician, served as the 13th Governor of Washington from 1945 to 1949

== See also ==
- 92297 Monrad (provisional designation: 2000 EL156), a main-belt minor planet
