= Sara Holmgren =

Swedish handball player (born 1979)

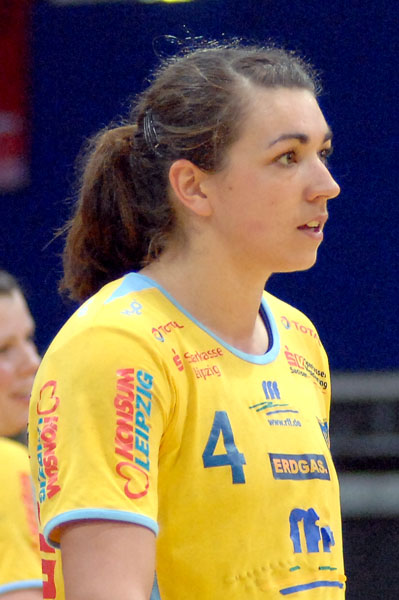
- Holmgren (2009)

Personal information
- Full name: Sara Josefina Holmgren
- Born: 29 March 1979 (age 47) Hörby, Sweden
- Height: 181 cm (71 in)

Sport
- Sport: Handball
- Position: Pivot

Youth career
- Years: Team
- –: IK Lågan

Senior clubs
- Years: Team
- -1999: IK Lågan
- 1999-2001: Team Skåne EIK
- 2001-2005: Horsens HK
- 2005-2008: FCK Handball
- 2008-2010: HC Leipzig
National team
Years	Team	Apps	(Gls)
1998-2009	Sweden	135	(180)

Sara Holmgren (born 1979) is a Swedish former handball player. She played for IK Lågan and Team Skåne EIK in her home country, Horsens HK and FCK Håndbold in Denmark and HC Leipzig in Germany. The also played for the Swedish national team. She participated at the 2008 Summer Olympics in China, where the Swedish team placed eighth.

== Career ==
Holmgren started playing handball at IK Lågan from her home town Hörby, where she played until she debuted for the Swedish national team at the age of 19. She then joined Team Skåne EIK, before moving to Denmark to become a professional handball player. Here she played four years for Horsens HK before joining FCK Håndbold. In 2004 she won the Danish Cup with Horsens HK.

Her last club was German HC Leipzig where she played for two years and won two Championships.

== Post player career ==
She has a degree in Medicine. In this role she has been a part of staff around the Swedish national team.

In 2014 she was elected for the Swedish Handball Federation board.
