= Sofie Blichert-Toft =

Danish handball player (born 1994)

Personal information
- Nationality: Danish
- Born: 31 March 1994 (age 32) Skive, Denmark
- Height: 1.81 m (5 ft 11 in)

Sport
- Sport: Handball
- Position: Left Back
- Current club: Skanderborg Håndbold

Youth career
- Years: Team
- –: Stoholm IF
- –: Skive fH
- –: Viborg HK
- –: Team Tvis Holstebro

Senior clubs
- Years: Team
- 2011-2013: Team Tvis Holstebro
- 2013-2017: Ringkøbing Håndbold
- 2017-2018: Team Esbjerg
- 2018-: Skanderborg Håndbold
Medal record
IHF Junior World Championship
| Bronze medal – third place | 2014 Croatia |
IHF Youth World Championship
| Gold medal – first place | 2012 Montenegro |
European Youth Championship
| Silver medal – second place | 2011 Czech Republic |

Sofie Blichert-Toft (born 31 March 1994) is a Danish handball player who currently plays for Skanderborg Håndbold.
