= Celine Holst Elkjær =

Danish handball player (born 1997)

Personal information
- Full name: Celine Holst Elkjær
- Nationality: Danish
- Born: 25 May 1997 (age 29) Skanderborg, Denmark
- Height: 1.78 m (5 ft 10 in)

Sport
- Sport: Handball
- Position: Line player
- Current club: HH Elite
- Number: 10

Senior clubs
- Years: Team
- 2014–2015: GOG Håndbold
- 2014–2015: Odense Håndbold
- 2015–2017: Skanderborg Håndbold
- 2017–2019: Aarhus United
- 2019–2020: Skanderborg Håndbold
- 2020–2021: HH Elite
- 2021–: Aarhus United Handball
Medal record
European Youth Olympic Festival
Gold medal – first place	2013 Utrecht

Celine Holst Elkjær (born 25 May 1997) is a Danish handball player who currently plays for HH Elite.

== Achievements ==
- Danish Cup
  - Bronze Medalist: 2017
