= Virum-Sorgenfri HK =

Danish handball club

- Full name: Virum-Sorgenfri Håndboldklub
- Founded: October 1, 1941; 84 years ago
- Dissolved: 2002; 24 years ago
- Arena: Virumhallerne
- Capacity: 688 (588 seats)

Virum-Sorgenfri Håndboldklub was a handball club based in Virum, north of Copenhagen, Denmark. They played at Virumhallerne. The club was founded in 1941 under the name Virum Gymnastikforening. Due to primarily being a handball club, they change their name – first to Virum Håndboldklub, and later Virum-Sorgenfri Håndboldklub. The club went bankrupt in 2002. The club VSH 2002 was founded as phoenix club.

The men's team was first promoted to the highest tier of Danish handball in 1973. In 1984/85 they fininshed third and in 1996/97 they won their only league title with Klavs Bruun Jørgensen as the undisputed star player. In the same season they won silver medals in the EHF Cup, losing to German SG Flensburg-Handewitt in the finals.

== Results ==
=== Danish league ===
- Won: 1996/97
- Second place: 1995/96, 1999/00
- Third place: 1984/85, 1991/92, 1997/1998.

=== Danish Cup ===
- Gold: 1988.

=== European tournaments ===
- Silver in EHF Cup 1996/97.

== Notable former players ==
- Irving Larsen
- Klavs Bruun Jørgensen
- Peter Bruun Jørgensen
- Sisse Bruun Jørgensen
- Rikke Hørlykke
- Camilla Andersen
- Charlotte Andersen
- Kristian Andersen
- Camilla Høgh Andersen
- Søren Herskind
- Lars Jørgensen
- Lars Rasmussen
- Ian Marko Fog
- Ulrik Wilbek
- Peter Henriksen
- Peter Nørklit
- Kim Keller
- Marianne Florman
- Thomas Sande
- Hans Henrik Hattesen
- Mikkel Holm Aagaard
- Mikkel Hansen
- Kasper Jørgensen
- Jannick Secher
- Martin Bager
- Michael Hoffmann
- Tommy Gernot
- Michael Riis
- Jeppe Haugaard
- Jeppe Sigfusson
- Karsten Nørsøller
- Mads Storgaard
- Jerome Cazal
- Lars Krogh Jeppesen
- Lars Thomsen
- Tom Høgh Andersen
- Otto Mertz
- Jan Eiberg Jørgensen
- Jørgen Sauer
- Maja Grønbæk

== Former Coaches ==
- Gert Andersen
- Ulrik Wilbek
- Flemming Oliver Jensen
- Brian Lyngholm
- Morten Soubak
