= Kristján Örn Kristjánsson =

Icelandic handball player (born 1997)

Personal information
- Nationality: Icelandic
- Born: 25 December 1997 (age 28) Reykjavík, Iceland
- Height: 1.93 m (6 ft 4 in)

Sport
- Sport: Handball
- Position: Right back
- Current club: Skanderborg AGF Håndbold
- Number: 3

Senior clubs
- Years: Team
- 2013–2018: Fjölnir
- 2018–2020: ÍBV
- 2020–2024: Pays d'Aix UC
- 2024–: Skanderborg AGF Håndbold
National team
Years	Team	Apps	(Gls)
2020–	Iceland	33	(61)
- Updated on 11 February 2025

Kristján Örn Kristjánsson (born 25 December 1997) is an Icelandic handball player for Skanderborg AGF Håndbold and the Icelandic national team. He represented Iceland at the 2021 and 2023 World Championships.
