= Rikke Hørlykke =

Danish handball player (born 1976)

Personal information
- Full name: Rikke Hørlykke Bruun Jørgensen
- Born: 2 May 1976 (age 50) Vejle, Denmark
- Spouse: Klavs Bruun Jørgensen (m. 2000)
- Handball career
- Height: 171 cm (67 in)
- Sport: Handball
- Position: Centre back

Senior clubs
- Years: Team
- –: Ballerup HK
- –: Værløse HK
- –1998: Virum-Sorgenfri HK
- 1998–1999: TV Lützellinden
- 1999–2001: Frederiksberg IF
- 2001–2004: GOG
- 2004–2006: Slagelse FH
- 2011: Frederiksberg IF
- 2012–2013: Virum-Sorgenfri HK
National team
Years	Team	Apps	(Gls)
2000–2005	Denmark	125	(234)
Medal record
Women's handball
Representing Denmark
Olympic Games
Gold medal – first place	2004 Athens	Team
European Championship
Gold medal – first place	2002 Denmark	Team
Silver medal – second place	2004 Hungary	Team

Rikke Hørlykke Bruun Jørgensen (born 2 May 1976) is a Danish former team handball player and Olympic champion. She received a gold medal with the Danish national team at the 2004 Summer Olympics in Athens. Additionally she won the European Championship 2002, and the Danish league and EHF Champions League in 2004.

At club level she played for a long list of clubs around Copenhagen, including Virum-Sorgenfri HK, Værløse HK, Ballerup HK and Frederiksberg IF. She also played for the German club TV Lützellinden in the 1998–99 season. Here she won the DHB-Pokal. From 2001 to 2004 she played for GOG Håndbold, followed by Slagelse DT before retiring in 2006 due to pregnancy. In 2011 she made a comeback for FIF. In January 2012 she rejoined Virum-Sorgenfri HK and helped them getting promoted to the Danish 1st Division. She retired for a second time after the 2012–13 season.

In 2000, she married the handball player Klavs Jørgensen. After her playing career she has worked as a TV-show host and as a personal trainer.
