= Maren Baumbach =

German handball player (born 1981)

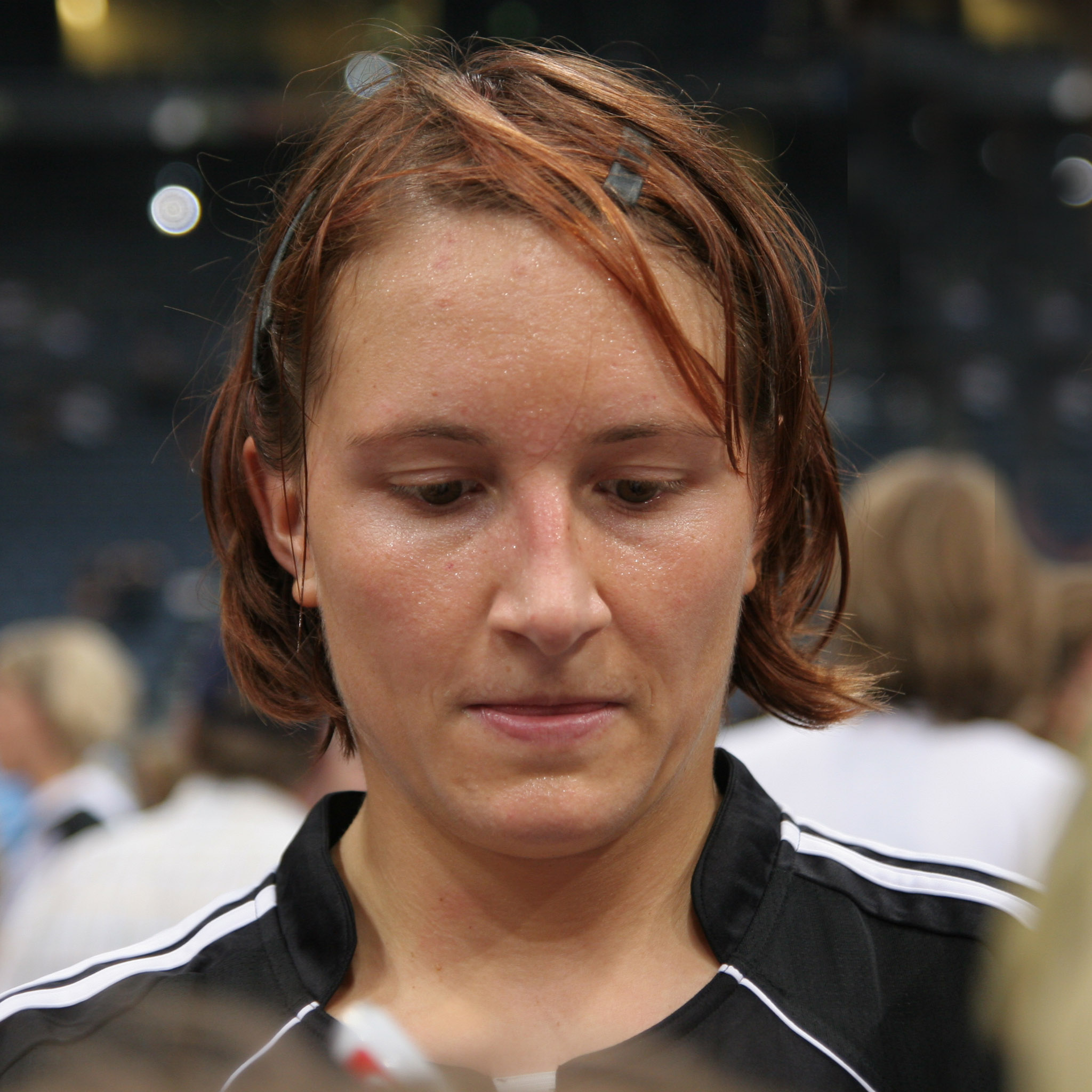
- Maren Baumbach (2008)

Personal information
- Nationality: German
- Born: 14 January 1981 (age 45) Bad Cannstatt, Tyskland
- Height: 1.70 m (5 ft 7 in)

Sport
- Sport: Handball
- Position: Centre back
- Current club: Retired

Youth career
- Years: Team
- 1989-1993: TV Oeffingen
- 1993-1999: VfL Waiblingen

Senior clubs
- Years: Team
- 1999-2000: TuS Metzingen
- 2000-2001: TuS Eintracht Minden
- 2001-2007: DJK/MJC Trier
- 2007-2009: FCK Håndbold
- 2010-2011: VfL Sindelfingen
National team
Years	Team	Apps	(Gls)
2000-2008	Germany	120	(341)
Medal record
Women's handball
Representing Germany
World Championship
Bronze medal – third place	2007 France	Team

Maren Baumbach (born 14 January 1981 in Stuttgart) is a German handball player. She played for the Danish club FCK Handball, as well as TuS Metzingen, TuS Eintracht Minden, DJK/MJC Trier and VfL Sindelfingen in Germany.

She won a bronze medal at the 2007 World Women's Handball Championship.

She competed with the German national team at the 2008 Summer Olympics in China, where Germany was placed 11th.
