= Micke Næsby =

Danish handball player (born 1973)

Personal information
- Full name: Micke Ricko Næsby
- Nationality: Danish
- Born: 13 May 1973 (age 53)
- Height: 193 cm (76 in)

Sport
- Sport: Handball
- Position: Right back

Senior clubs
- Years: Team
- -2004: Fredericia HK
- 2004-2004: Algeciras BM
- 2004-2004: CB Cangas
- 2005-2006: Aarhus GF
- 2006-2006: HSG Wetzlar
- 2007-2008: Fredericia HK
- 2008-?: Vejle Bredballe
- 2011-?: Børkop HK (player-coach)

Teams managed
- 2011-?: Børkop HK (player-coach)

Micke Ricko Næsby (born 13 May 1973) is a Danish former handball player.

== Career ==
Næsby played for Fredericia HK until 2004. In the 2003-04 season he was the top scorer in the Danish League with 227 goals. He then joined Spanish team Algeciras BM, followed by CB Cangas.

In 2005 he returned to Danish handball where he joined Aarhus GF. After 1 season he left the club after a mutual termination of his contract. He then joined HSG Wetzlar in Germany, but already in November the same year he had his contract cancelled. He returned to Fredericia HK. He could however not play for the rest of the season, as the paper work had not been completed in time for him to be registrered. He therefore played for the 2nd team, for the rest of the season and only joined the first team for the 2007-08 season. In the 2007-08 season he was named the player of the year by the Fredericia fan group. During the season, he publicly criticized the decision to fire Nick Rasmussen.

In 2008 he joined the third tier club Vejle Bredballe. In 2011 he joined the lower league club Børkop HK as a player-coach.
