= Ida Götzsche =

Danish handball player (born 2005)

Personal information
- Full name: Ida Ernfred Götzsche
- Nationality: Danish
- Born: 25 May 2005 (age 21) Copenhagen, Denmark
- Height: 1.79 m (5 ft 10 in)

Sport
- Sport: Handball
- Position: Right wing
- Current club: Skanderborg Håndbold
- Number: 5

Youth career
- Years: Team
- 2021–2023: Ajax København

Senior clubs
- Years: Team
- 2023–2024: København Håndbold
- 2024–2025: Aarhus Håndbold
- 2025–: Skanderborg Håndbold
Medal record
Youth World Championship
Silver medal – second place	2022 North Macedonia
Junior European Championship
Silver medal – second place	2023 Romania

Ida Ernfred Götzsche (born 25 May 2005) is a Danish handball player for Skanderborg Håndbold in the Damehåndboldligaen.

Götzsche also represented the Danish junior national team at the 2021 European Women's U-17 Handball Championship in Montenegro, 2022 IHF Women's U18 Handball World Championship in North Macedonia and the 2023 European Women's U-19 Handball Championship in Romania, winning silver both times.

In June 2023, she joined København Håndbold for a one-year deal. In July 2025, she signed a two-year contract with Skanderborg Håndbold.

== Achievements ==
- Youth World Championship:
  - Silver Medalist: 2022
- Junior European Championship:
  - Silver Medalist: 2023
