= Hans Hattesen =

Danish handball player (born 1958)

Hans Henrik Hattesen (born May 12, 1958) is a Danish former handball player who competed in the 1980 Summer Olympics and in the 1984 Summer Olympics.

He was born in Copenhagen.

In 1980 he was part of the Danish team which finished ninth in the Olympic tournament. He played five matches and scored seven goals.

Four years later he finished fourth with the Danish team in the 1984 Olympic tournament. He played all six matches and scored 14 goals.

He debuted for the Danish national team in November 1979 in a match against Yugoslavia. In total he played 134 games for the Danish national team, scoring 284 goals. At club level he played for Virum-Sorgenfri HK in Denmark and Pfadi Winterthur in Switzerland. In 1985 he was joint topscorer in the Danish league with 101 goals. He shared the position with Michael Jørn Berg. The same year he was named Danish handballer of the year.
