= Gert Andersen =

Danish handball player (born 1939)

Gert Andersen (born 18 June 1939) is a Danish former handball player, playing on the Danish national team.

He played on the national team at the world championships in both 1964 and 1970. He played more than 530 matches for the club HG from 1957 to 1970 winning six Danish championships.

While still playing he trained the FIF women making them Danish Champions twice. He also won a championship with the men from Helsingør as a coach in 1987–88.

He was educated as an Engineer. Privately he was married to the handball player Toni Røseler in 1963. They became parents to twins, Camilla and Charlotte of which the first mentioned became a handballplayer too, and has the record for most goals ever on the Danish women's team.
