= Torbjørn Bergerud =

Norwegian handball player (born 1994)

- Bergerud in 2026

Personal information
- Full name: Torbjørn Sittrup Bergerud
- Nationality: Norwegian
- Born: 16 July 1994 (age 32) Åros Røyken, Norway
- Height: 1.99 m (6 ft 6 in)

Sport
- Sport: Handball
- Position: Goalkeeper
- Current club: Fredericia HK
- Number: 30

Senior clubs
- Years: Team
- 2011–2015: Drammen HK
- 2015–2016: Lugi HF
- 2016–2018: TTH Holstebro
- 2018–2021: SG Flensburg-Handewitt
- 2021–2022: GOG Håndbold
- 2022–2025: Kolstad Håndball
- 2025–2026: Wisła Płock
- 2026–: Fredericia HK
National team
Years	Team	Apps	(Gls)
2013–	Norway	174	(0)
Medal record
World Championship
Silver medal – second place	2017 France
Silver medal – second place	2019 Germany/Denmark
European Championship
Bronze medal – third place	2020 Sweden/Austria/Norway

Torbjørn Sittrup Bergerud (born 16 July 1994) is a Norwegian handball player for Fredericia HK and the Norwegian national team.

In 2017, he won the Danish Men's Handball Cup and was named MVP for the tournament.

== International honours ==
- World Championship:
  - Silver: 2017, 2019
- European Championship:
  - Bronze: 2020
