= Sisse Bruun Jørgensen =

Danish handball player and coach (born 1971)

Personal information
- Nationality: Danish
- Born: 20 August 1971 (age 55) Gentofte, Denmark

Sport
- Sport: Handball

Senior clubs
- Years: Team
- 1993-1997: Virum-Sorgenfri HK
- 1998: Ferrobus Mislata
- 1998-1999: Viborg HK
- 2000-2002: Virum-Sorgenfri HK
- 2002-2003: HC Salerno
National team
| Years | Team | Apps | (Gls) |
| 1994–1996 | Denmark | 30 | (65) |

Teams managed
- 2006-2007: Nordsjælland Håndbold assistant
- 2008-2009: Nordsjælland Håndbold

Sisse Bruun Jørgensen (born 20 August 1971) is a Danish handball player and coach, who played for the Danish national team.

== Playing career ==
She was the top scorer in the Danish top league, Damehåndboldligaen in the 1993-94 season, when she played for Virum-Sorgenfri HK. She announced her retirement in 2001 at the age of 29, despite her club Virum-Sorgenfri HK wanting to keep her. Ultimately she decided to continue and played for two more seasons.

== Coaching career ==
In the 2006-07 season she was the assistent coach at Nordsjælland Håndbold under Flemming Hansen, while also playing for the club's second team in the 3rd division (5th tier). When Flemming Hansen surprisingly decided to quit his position despite good results, Sisse Bruun Jørgensen was promoted to head coach at the club. She was in the position for a year. From 2013 to 2015 she was responsible for youth development at her former club Virum-Sorgenfri HK.

== Private ==
Her two brother, Peter Bruun Jørgensen and Klavs Bruun Jørgensen, are both former professional handball players. All three players came through at Virum-Sorgenfri HK, as their parents were active members of the club.

She has a degree in pedagogy.
