= 2007–08 Håndboldligaen (men's handball) =

Danish Handball League
- Season: 2007–08
- Champions: FCK Håndbold 1st title
- Relegated: Skanderborg Håndbold
- EHF Champions League: FCK Håndbold, GOG
- EHF Cup: BSH, AGF
- Top goalscorer: (Serbia) Milutin Dragićević (177 goals)

The 2007–08 Danish Handball League season, officially known as Tele2 Ligaen for sponsorship reasons, was the 72nd edition of the Danish Handball League. GOG were the defending champions.

FCK Håndbold won the title, when they beat GOG Håndbold in the finals. FCK Håndbold won the regular season, while Skanderborg Håndbold were relegated, when they finished last in the regular season.

== League table ==
The regular season was a double round robin. The 4 best teams qualified for the championship playoff, while the last place was relegated. The rest qualified for the relegation playoff.

=== Regular season ===
	Team	P	W	D	L	G+	G−	Pts
1	FCK Håndbold	26	21	2	3	850	711	44
2	Aarhus GF	26	17	2	7	819	751	36
3	GOG	26	17	2	7	794	733	36
4	Bjerringbro-Silkeborg	26	17	2	7	794	733	35
5	KIF Kolding	26	16	3	7	847	760	35
6	Skjern	26	16	3	7	774	708	34
7	AaB	26	13	4	9	771	760	30
8	Team Tvis Holstebro	26	12	2	12	726	709	26
9	Fredericia HK	26	11	2	13	708	730	24
10	Viborg HK	26	10	1	15	771	765	21
11	Nordsjælland	26	9	3	14	730	761	21
12	Mors-Thy Håndbold	26	6	1	19	639	814	13
13	TMS Ringsted	26	3	1	22	662	826	13
14	Skanderborg	26	0	2	24	645	863	2

Champion Playoff
Relegation Playoff
Relegation

=== Championship Round ===
The championship round was played with two semifinals; one between the 1st and 4th placed and one between the 2nd and 3rd placed teams.

== Semifinals ==
Date	Teams	Result
19 April	FCK Håndbold – Bjerringbro-Silkeborg	31–31
26 April	Bjerringbro-Silkeborg – FCK Håndbold	37–39

Date	Teams	Result
19 April	AGF – GOG	36–37
26 April	GOG – AGF	29–26

=== Finals ===
Date	Teams	Result
16 May	FCK – GOG	36–29
20 May	GOG – FCK	31–31
