= Sara Eriksson (handballer) =

Swedish handball player (born 1981)

Personal information
- Full name: Sara Linnéa Eriksson
- Nationality: Swedish
- Born: April 13, 1981 (age 45) Linköping, Sweden
- Height: 182 cm (72 in)

Sport
- Sport: Handball
- Position: Left back
- Current club: Retired

Youth career
- Years: Team
- –: Lambohov IF
- –: Risbrinkspojkarna

Senior clubs
- Years: Team
- 2000-2004: Team Eslövs IK
- 2004-2006: Gjerpen Håndball
- 2006-2008: FCK Håndbold
- 2008-2011: HC Leipzig
National team
Years	Team	Apps	(Gls)
2002-2010	Sweden	126	(167)

Sara Eriksson (born 13 April 1981) is a Swedish former handball player. She plays for the Swedish national team. She participated at the 2008 Summer Olympics in China, where the Swedish team placed eighth.

== Career ==
Eriksson started playing handball at Lambohov IF before joining Risbrinkspojkarna. Her first senior team was Team Eslövs IK. Here she won two Swedish championships. After 5 years at the club she moved to Gjerpen Håndball in Norway, where she became a professional handball player. She only played there for two years, before joining Danish side FCK Håndbold in 2006. In 2008 she joined German HC Leipzig. Here she won the German championship twice before retiring in 2011.
