= Flemming Hansen (handballer) =

Danish handball player (1948-2013)

Flemming Ladefoged Hansen (September 11, 1948 in Fredericia, Denmark – July 14, 2013) was a Danish handball player who competed in the 1972 Summer Olympics.

He played his club handball with Fredericia KFUM, and was the top goalscorer of the 1971, 1972, 1973, 1974, 1975, and 1976 Danish Handball League seasons. He debuted for the Danish national team in July 1968 against the Soviet Union. During his active years he played 75 matches for the Danish national team, scoring 359 goals. His last match for Denmark was in January 1977 against Sweden. In 1972 he was part of the Denmark team which finished thirteenth in the Olympic tournament. He played all five matches and scored 27 goals.

From 1971 to 1998 he held the record for most goals in a single match for the Danish national team with 14, until he was overtaken by Nikolaj Jacobsen with 15.
