= Súna Krossteig Hansen =

Faroese handball player (born 2000)

Personal information
- Full name: Súna Krossteig Hansen
- Nationality: Faroese
- Born: 29 March 2000 (age 26) Torshavn, Faroe Islands
- Height: 1.67 m (5 ft 6 in)

Sport
- Sport: Handball
- Position: Left back
- Current club: Skanderborg Håndbold
- Number: 20

Senior clubs
- Years: Team
- 2017–2022: Kyndil
- 2022–2024: Ajax København
- 2024–: Skanderborg Håndbold
National team
Years	Team	Apps	(Gls)
2022–	Faroe Islands	37	(82)
- Updated on November 2025

Súna Krossteig Hansen (born 29 March 2000) is a Faroese handballer who plays for Danish club Skanderborg Håndbold in the Danish Women's Handball League and the Faroe Islands women's national team.

She played for Faroese club Kyndil until 2022, where she joined Danish side Ajax København. She played here for 2 years before joined Skanderborg Håndbold in 2024.

Her first major international tournament was the 2024 European Women's Handball Championship, which was also the first ever major international tournament for Faroes Islands ever. At the 2025 World Championship she was part of the Faroe Islands team that played for the first time at a World Championship. With wins over Spain and Paraguay they advanced from the preliminary groups and recorded their first ever win at a major international tournament.
