= Bjarne Jeppesen =

Danish handball player (1954–2024)

Bjarne Andersen
Personal information
- Nationality: Danish
- Born: 19 August 1954 Glostrup Denmark
- Died: 14 October 2024 (aged 70) Fredericia, Denmark

Sport
- Sport: Handball
- Position: Left wing

Senior clubs
- Years: Team
- –: Efterslægten
- –: Fredericia KFUM
- 1983-1985: Kolding HK
- 1985-1991: KIF Kolding
National team
Years	Team	Apps	(Gls)
1977-1982	Denmark	88	(290)

Teams managed
- 1985-1994: KIF Kolding

Bjarne Jeppesen (19 August 1954 – 14 October 2024) was a Danish handball player who competed in the 1980 Summer Olympics. He was known for his speed on the left wing. He died on 14 October 2024, at the age of 70.

== Playing career ==
Jeppesen started his handball career at Efterslægten, and joined Fredericia KFUM in the late 1970s. In 1976 he reached the final of the EHF Cup with the club, but lost to Borac Banja Luka in the final. In 1979 he was named Danish male handball player of the year. In the 1981-82 he was the top scorer in the Danish handball league with 117 goals.

In 1983 he joined Kolding HK where he was the player-coach for two years before joining city rivals KIF Kolding, once again as a player coach. Here he won the Danish championship four times in a row between 1987 and 1991; the first championships in club history. He retired in 1991 at the age of 37. He then continued as a coach at the club for three more years, winning a fifth Danish championship. Later he played for a short while for TMS Ringsted.

=== National team ===
He debuted for the Danish national team on February 24th, 1977 and played a total of 88 national team matches. His last match was in 1982.

In 1980 he finished ninth with the Danish team in the Olympic tournament. The Danish team only one a single match. He played five matches and scored 24 goals.

His most famous moment was when he scored the winning goal against Spain at the 1982 World Championship in West Germany. Denmark had finished third in the preliminary round. In the main round a draw against Hungary meant that the team did not reach the final, but had to contend with the third place play-off against Poland, which they lost by a single goal.

== Post-playing career ==
Bjarne Jeppesen worked as a teacher in Fredericia.
