= Brian Lyngholm =

Danish handball coach (born 1963)

Personal information
- Nationality: Danish
- Born: 22 December 1963 (age 62)

Sport
- Sport: Handball

Teams managed
- Years: Team
- 1990-1991: Roskilde Roar (assistant coach)
- 1992-1994: Viborg HK
- 1995-1997: Virum-Sorgenfri Håndboldklub women's team
- 1999-2000: Virum-Sorgenfri Håndboldklub men's team
- 2003-2005: Slagelse DT (assistant coach)
- 2006-2007: Denmark women's national team

Brian Lyngholm (born 22 December 1963) is a Danish handball coach, who acted as the coach for the Denmark Women's national team.

Lyngholm's tenure as national coach was brief. He was seen as the natural successor to Ulrik Wilbek og Jan Pytlick. However, the results at his only major tournament, the 2006 European Women's Handball Championship were not satisfactory, with Denmark finishing 11th, which is the worst result for the Danish national team ever. He stepped down from the job a month after the tournament. He was replaced by Jan Pytlick, who returned to the position following Lyngholm's departure.
