= Christoffer Bonde =

Danish handball player (born 1999)

Personal information
- Full name: Christoffer Hoffmann Bonde
- Nationality: Danish
- Born: 5 January 1999 (age 27) Hornbæk, Randers, Denmark
- Height: 193 cm (76 in)

Sport
- Sport: Handball
- Position: goalkeeper
- Current club: Skjern Håndbold
- Number: 1

Youth career
- Years: Team
- –: Hornbæk SF
- –: Randers DH
- –: Randers HH

Senior clubs
- Years: Team
- 2018–2021: Aarhus Håndbold
- 2021–2026: Skjern Håndbold
- 2026–: HBC Nantes
National team
Years	Team	Apps	(Gls)
2026–	Denmark	3	(0)
- Updated on 8 April 2026

Christoffer Hoffmann Bonde (born 5 January 1999) is a Danish handball goalkeeper, who plays for Skjern Håndbold and the Danish national team.

== Career ==
Bonde started playing handball at age 10 for Hornbæk SF and later moved to Randers DH and Randers HH. In 2018 he joined Aarhus Håndbold, where he made his senior debut. In 2020 he extended his contract until 2023. He would however not stay in Aarhus long, as the club went bankrupt and was relegated in April 2021. He then joined Skjern Håndbold. In his first season at the club he was a part of the Danish League all-star team. In 2023 he extended his contract with the club until 2027.

In the 2024-25 season he was included in the Danish league all-star team for a second time.

From the 2026–27 season he will join French club HBC Nantes.

=== National team ===
He was selected for the Danish national team for the first time in March 2026 for the Golden League tournament. He made his debut against Norway. On his first play, he managed to make a penalty throw double-save.
