= Lars Rasmussen (handballer) =

Danish handball player (born 1976)

Personal information
- Nationality: Danish
- Born: 9 April 1976 (age 50) Hillerød, Denmark
- Height: 1.73 m (5 ft 8 in)

Sport
- Sport: Handball
- Position: Left Wing
- Current club: KIF Kolding

Youth career
- Years: Team
- -: Lyngby HK

Senior clubs
- Years: Team
- 1995-2002: Virum-Sorgenfri HK
- 2002-2003: Ajax Farum
- 2003-2005: GWD Minden
- 2005-2010: Team Tvis Holstebro
National team
Years	Team	Apps	(Gls)
1998-2010	Denmark	86	(220)

Teams managed
- 2010-2012: Horsens HK
- 2013-2015: Vendsyssel Håndbold
- 2015-2017: Ringkøbing Håndbold
- 2017-2018: Siófok KC
- 2018: KIF Kolding (assistant)
- 2019: KIF Kolding
Medal record
Representing Denmark
Men's handball
World Championships
Bronze medal – third place	2007 Germany	Team competition
European Championships
Gold medal – first place	2008 Norway	Team competition
Bronze medal – third place	2006 Switzerland	Team competition

Lars Rasmussen (born 9 April 1976) is a Danish former team handball player and coach. He was European Champion by winning the 2008 European Men's Handball Championship with the Danish national handball team. This was the first time Denmark won a major international tournament. He also received a bronze medal at the 2007 World Men's Handball Championship and at the 2006 European Men's Handball Championship.

== Playing career ==
Rasmussen started his career Virum-Sorgenfri HK, where he won the 1997 Herrehåndboldligaen, the first in club history. He then joined Ajax Farum. In the 2002-03 season he was the topscorer in the Danish league. In 2003 he joined German team GWD Minden. In 2005 he returned to Denmark to play for Team Tvis Holstebro, where he played until 2010, where he retired. With TTH he won the Danish Men's Handball Cup in 2008.

=== National team ===
He made his debut for the Danish national team in 1998, where he was primarily the back up to first Nikolaj Jacobsen followed Lars Christiansen.

He played at the 2006 European Championship, but was only included in the squad after Boris Schnuchel was injured shortly before the tournament. Here he won a bronze medal with Denmark.

== Coaching career ==
In 2010 he became the assistant coach at the women's team of Horsens HK. Later he became the head coach of both the men's and women's team. He left the team, when they went bankrupt in 2012.

In 2013 he took over Vendsyssel Håndbold in the Danish 1st Division.

In 2015 he took over Ringkøbing Håndbold in the top flight. In 2017 he moved to Hungary and became the head coach of Siófok KC.

In 2018 he returned to Denmark and became the assistant coach at KIF Kolding. In February 2019 he was promoted to head coach, which he was for the rest of the season.

== Post-playing career ==
In November 2023 he published a book titled What the fuck, Lars! Alle kan blive til noget, about how his life changed following getting diagnosed with autism and ADHD.
