= Grindsted GIF Håndbold =

Danish handball club

- Full name: Grindsted GIF Håndbold
- Founded: 1902
- Arena: Lynghallen, Grindsted, Denmark
- Capacity: 700
- President: Flemming Pedersen
- Head coach: Jacob Vinholt Pedersen
- League: Håndboldligaen
- 2025–26: 14th out of 14th (relegated)
- Club colours
Home	Away

Grindsted GIF Håndbold is the handball department of the multi-sports club Grindsted GIF based in the town of Grindsted in Jutland, Denmark. The club was founded in 1902. Grindsted competes in the men's Danish Handball League in the 2024/25 season for the first time in club history.

The club also has a soccer team in the Danish amateur divisions.

== History ==
In 2016 they played in Serie 1, the 6th tier of Danish handball. In 2018 they were promoted to the second division.

In 2020 they were promoted to the Danish 1st division, the second tier, and two years after they were close to promotion, but lost the playoff matches.

In 2024 they secured promotion by winning the Danish 1st division, being a fully amateur team while doing it. In 2023 the club formally became a professional handball club, but chose not sign any contracts with any players. During their first season in the Danish top division, they reached the semifinal of the Danish Cup for the first time in club history. They did however lose the semifinal to Bjerringbro-Silkeborg 23:37. They also lost the third place play-off to SønderjyskE Håndbold the day after by 24-25. This was the first time a newly promoted team had reached the semifinals of the Danish cup. During the 2024-25 season they were noted by playing 7v6 more often than not. On the last day of the regular season, they survived direct relegation after beating Bjerringbro-Silkeborg away. They later won the relegation playoff against Skive fH.

However the season after they were relegated when they finished last in the league phase.

== Team ==
=== Current squad ===
Squad for the 2025–26 season

Goalkeepers

- 12 (Denmark) Benjamin Boye
- 16 (Denmark) Christian Wechte

Left Wingers

- 10 (Denmark) Nikolaj Svalastog
- 20 (Denmark) Frederik Lagerbon-Iversen

Right Wingers

- 3 (Denmark) Thomas Theilgaard
- 7 (Denmark) Jakob Villemoes

Line players

- 17 (Norway) Aksel Strupstad
- 22 (Denmark) Hjalmar Andersen
- 23 (Denmark) Jonas Neve

Left Backs

- 8 (Denmark) Anders Toft
- 15 (Denmark) Jonas Fuglsbjerg
- 24 (Faroe Islands) Búi Djurhuus Poulsen
- 25 (Denmark) Rune Overlund Sørensen

Central Backs

- 4 (Denmark) Frederik Hildebrand Mølby
- 19 (Denmark) Oskar Jakobsen Egsgaard
- 21 (Denmark) Kristoffer Vestergaard

Right Backs

- 5 (Denmark) Mads Jørgensen
- 14 (Denmark) Jon Katballe
- 18 (Denmark) Martin Risom

Defenders

- 11 (Denmark) Kristoffer Jessen

=== Transfers ===
Transfers for the 2026–27 season

Joining

- (Denmark) Frederik Jaegerum (LW) from (Denmark) Fredericia HK
- (Denmark) Jonas Nielsen (RW) from (Denmark) TM Tønder
- (Denmark) Lukas Sandgaard (LP) (from (Denmark) Rækker Mølle Håndbold
- (Denmark) Jacob Dalager (LB) on loan from (Denmark) GOG Håndbold
- (Denmark) Frederik Schrader Rudolph (LB) (from (Denmark) Skanderborg AGF Håndbold U19)

Leaving

- (Denmark) Jacob Villemoes (RW) to (Denmark) Skanderborg AGF Håndbold
- (Denmark) Jonas Fuglsbjerg (LB) to (Denmark) Lemvig-Thyborøn Håndbold
- (Denmark) Lasse Boesen (Assistant Coach) (to ?)
- (Denmark) Frederik Lagerbon-Iversen (LW) (to ?)
- (Denmark) Martin Risom (RB) (Retires)
- (Denmark) Hjalmar Andersen (P) (Retires)
- (Norway) Aksel Strupstad (P) (to ?)
