= Sander Heieren =

Norwegian handball player (born 1998)

Personal information
- Full name: Sander Drange Heieren
- Nationality: Norwegian
- Born: 23 October 1998 (age 27) Sande, Vestfold, Norway
- Height: 1.95 m (6 ft 5 in)

Sport
- Sport: Handball
- Position: Goalkeeper
- Current club: TTH Holstebro
- Number: 16

Senior clubs
- Years: Team
- 2017–2019: Fold-St. Hallvard
- 2019–2022: Drammen HK
- 2022–2025: TTH Holstebro
- 2025–: Fredericia HK
National team
| Years | Team | Apps | (Gls) |
| 2021– | Norway | 9 | (0) |

Sander Drange Heieren (born 23 October 1998) is a Norwegian handball player for TTH Holstebro and the Norwegian national team.

He represented Norway at the 2022 European Men's Handball Championship.

== Career ==
Heieren started playing handball aged 14. In the 2020-21 season he was named goalkeeper of the yeer, while playing for Drammen HK. The next season he won the Norwegian League with the club. In 2022 he joined Danish club TTH Holstebro.

In 2025 he joined league rivals Fredericia HK.

== Individual awards ==
- All-Star Goalkeeper of REMA 1000-ligaen: 2020/21, 2021/22
