= Paw Peters =

Danish handball player (born 1976)

Personal information
- Nationality: Danish
- Born: 1 July 1976 (age 50) Fredericia, Denmark
- Height: 194 cm (76 in)
- Weight: 100 kg (220 lb)

Sport
- Sport: Handball
- Position: Left back

Senior clubs
- Years: Team
- –: Fredericia HK

Paw Peters (born July 1, 1976) is a Danish former handballer, playing left back. He played all his career in the Danish league club Fredericia HK, even following them down to the fourth tier of Danish handball, following the clubs bankruptcy.

He is educated as a police officer.
