= Camilla Andersen =

Danish handball player (born 1973)

Personal information
- Nationality: Danish
- Born: 5 July 1973 (age 53) Gentofte, Denmark
- Height: 1.69 m (5 ft 7 in)

Sport
- Sport: Handball
- Position: Playmaker

Senior clubs
- Years: Team
- 1985–1991: Virum-Sorgenfri Håndboldklub
- 1991–1992: FIF
- 1992–1993: Nordstrand IF
- 1993–1996: Buxtehuder SV
- 1996–1997: Bækkelagets SK
- 1997–2001: FIF
- 2001–2004: Slagelse FH
- 2004–2005: FCK Håndbold
National team
Years	Team	Apps	(Gls)
1992–2000	Denmark	194	(846)
Medal record
Women's handball
Representing Denmark
Olympic Games
Gold medal – first place	1996 Atlanta	Team
Gold medal – first place	2000 Sydney	Team
World Championship
Gold medal – first place	1997 Germany	Team
Silver medal – second place	1993 Norway	Team
Bronze medal – third place	1995 Austria/Hungary	Team
European Championship
Gold medal – first place	1994 Germany	Team
Gold medal – first place	1996 Denmark	Team
Silver medal – second place	1998 Netherlands	Team
- Updated on 1 July 2013

Camilla Røseler Andersen (born 5 July 1973) is a Danish former team handball player, two times Olympic champion and a World champion. She received gold medals with the Danish national team at the 1996 Summer Olympics in Atlanta and at the 2000 Summer Olympics in Sydney. She is widely regarded as one of the best players Danish handball has ever seen. With 846 goals she has scored the most goals in the Danish Women's national team ever, and she has played the 6th most matches on the national team.

Both of her parents, Gert Andersen and Toni Røseler as well as her maternal Grandfather, Walter Røseler, were also handball players and played on their respective Danish national teams.

In 2000, she entered a registered partnership with Norwegian handball player Mia Hundvin, but the couple split three years later. Sports Illustrated ran a lengthy feature on the two, who are much-discussed celebrities in their countries.

After retiring from sports, Camilla Andersen's civil career started as a student in the travel industry of the defunct company, Reisegalleriet. Later she started her travel agency Travel Sense specializing in sports trips.

In 2012, she was admitted to the National Olympic Committee and Sports Confederation of Denmark's Hall of Fame as the 27th member.

== Achievements ==
- Danish Championship:
  - Winner: 2003
  - Silver Medalist: 2004
- Danish Cup:
  - Winner: 1997, 2002
- Norwegian Cup:
  - Winner: 1997
- EHF Champions League
  - Winner: 2004
- EHF Cup:
  - Winner: 2003
- EHF Cup Winners' Cup:
  - Winner: 1994

== Individual awards ==
- All-Star Playmaker of European Championship: 1994, 1998
- All-Star Playmaker of World Championship: 1997
- Player of the Year in Denmark: 2003
- EHF Hall of Fame in 2023.
- Damehåndboldligaen topscorer: 1997–98, 1998–99, 1999–2000, 2001–02, 2002-03
