= Tobias Nielsén =

Swedish economist and writer (born 1975)

Tobias Nielsén (born 1975) is a graduated economist from Stockholm School of Economics and Columbia Business School, New York City, publisher and writer. He began his career as a journalist for the Swedish newspaper Expressen in 1995 and later founded the publishing house/research firm Volante where he now is CEO and publisher. Nielsén is also running the blog www.kulturekonomi.se together with researcher Emma Stenström. In 2009 he was nominated for the "Cultural Policy Research Award", established by the European Commission.

In 2013 Nielsén was named one of Sweden's 101 Super Talents by the business weekly magazine "Veckans Affärer".

== Bibliography ==
- Nielsén, Tobias (2013), "Fragile Creativity: Lessons from the rise and fall, and rise again, of Sweden’s biggest rock festival", in Lindeborg, Lisbeth--Lindkvist, Lars (eds.), The Value of Arts and Culture for Regional Development, London: Routledge.
- Nielsén, Tobias (2013), "Passion och innovation", in Strömbäck, Jesper (ed.), Framtidsutmaningar: Det nya Sverige, Stockholm: 8tto.
- Nielsén, Tobias et al. (2010), Creative Business — 10 lessons to help you build a business your way. Stockholm: Volante.
- Nielsén, Tobias — Rydell, Anders (red. 2010), “Noll Noll: decenniet som förändrade världen”, Volante.
- Nielsén, Tobias et al. (2006), The Eriba Model – an effective and successful policy framework for the creative industries. Stockholm: The Knowledge Foundation.
