= Skanderborg Håndbold =

Danish women's handball club

- Founded: 1981; 45 years ago
- Arena: Skanderborg Fælled
- Capacity: 1,700
- President: Jens Christensen
- Head coach: Kim Johansen
- League: Damehåndboldligaen
- 2024-25: 13th
- Club colours
Home	Away

Skanderborg Håndbold, previously known as Vrold-Skanderborg Håndboldklub is a handball club, currently only running a women's team at the top level. It is based in Skanderborg in Jutland, Denmark.

The club has over 650 members, which makes it one of the biggest handball clubs in Denmark and the biggest in Jutland.

In 2021, Aarhus Håndbold merged with Skanderborg Håndbold's men's team, and they changed the name to Skanderborg Aarhus Håndbold. Their academy is called Skanderborg Håndbold Elite Akademi or normally just called SHEA.

== History ==
The club was founded in 1982 and was the result of a merger between Stilling-Skanderborg and Vrold-Skanderborg Handball Club.

In the 2007-08 season the team was relegated from the top league, after not winning a single game in the regular season. The men's team played in the top division Herrehåndboldligaen from the 2011-12 season until the merger with Aarhus GF Håndbold in 2021. In 2019 the men's team reached the Danish Men's Handball Cup final for the first time, where they lost to Aalborg Håndbold.

The women's team was promoted to the top division, Damehåndboldligaen in 2016. The promoted team had only amateur players. In their first season they were however relegated after finishing last. Two years after they were back in the top league. In the 2018-19 Damehåndboldligaen they survived, when they finished 10th in the league. The following 5 years they would survive, although they often ended only a single spot above the relegation zone and then surviving the relegation play-out. In the 2019-20 they were in 13th place when the season was cancelled due to the Covid-19 Pandemic, beating EH Aalborg only by virtue of winning the single head-to-head match. In the 2024-25 season they beat Aarhus Håndbold by having a better head-to-head record, after both teams finished on 12 points, and then later beating Holstebro Håndbold in the relegation play-out.

The club played at Morten Børup Hallen until 2017, where they changed to Fælledhallen.

Location of Skanderborg Håndbold

== Team ==
Squad for the 2026-27 season

Goalkeeper

- 1 (Denmark) Emilia Borgstrøm
- 16 (Denmark) Lucca Else Bøg Hede
- 88 (Faroe Islands) Rakul Wardum

Wingers
LW

- 6 (Denmark) Freya Koch
- 19 (Denmark) Julie Bjerregaard

RW

- 5 (Denmark) Ida Götzsche
- 22 (Denmark) Anne Sofie Filtenborg
- 44 (Denmark) Louise Hald

Pivots

- 3 (Denmark) Liva Strøm Andersen
- 8 (Denmark) Katrine Jacobsen
- 23 (Denmark) Caroline Friis Hansen

Back players
LB

- 14 (Denmark) Laura Skytte
- 18 (Denmark) Johanne Blond
- 21 (Denmark) Dicte Sønderskov Andersen

CB

- 7 (Denmark) Andrea Vejsgaard
- 9 (Denmark) Cecilie Frydendahl Nørskov
- 25 (Denmark) Astrid Leslie
- 35 (Denmark) Annika Solberg

RB

- 4 (Denmark) Anna Mathilde Hansen
- 17 (Denmark) Malou Mørch Axel
- 57 (Denmark) Anna Hviid Bang

=== Technical staff ===
Staff for the 2025-26 season.

- (Denmark) Head Coach: Kim Johansen
- (Denmark) Assistant coach: Frederik Friis
- (Denmark) Team Leader: Pernille Mikkelsen
- (Denmark) Team Leader: Bent Mikkelsen
- (Denmark) Physiotherapist: Morten Kirk Olesen
- (Denmark) Chiropractor: Anne-Marie Madsen
- (Denmark) Goalkeeping coach: Kent Jæger

=== Transfers ===
Transfers for the season 2026-27

Joining

- (Denmark) Ole Bukholt Jensen (Head Coach)
- (Faroe Islands) Rakul Wardum (GK) (from (Denmark) Ringkøbing Håndbold)
- (Denmark) Emilia Borgstrøm (GK) (from youth team)
- (Denmark) Freya Koch (LW) (from (Denmark) Gudme HK)
- (Denmark) Laura Skytte (LB) (from (Denmark) Ajax København)
- (Denmark) Johanne Blond (LB) (from youth team)
- (Denmark) Annika Solberg (CB) (from (Denmark) Bjerringbro FH)
- (Denmark) Cecilie Frydendahl Nørskov (CB) (from youth team)
- (Denmark) Andrea Vejsgaard (CB) (from youth team)
- (Denmark) Anna Mathilde Nordvig Hansen (RB) (from youth team)
- (Denmark) Anna Hviid Bang (RB) (from (Denmark) Bjerringbro FH)
- (Denmark) Malou Mørch Axel (RB) (from youth team)
- (Denmark) Louise Hald (RW) (from (Denmark) Bjerringbro FH)

Leaving

- (Denmark) Kim Johansen (Head Coach) (to (Denmark) SønderjyskE Damehåndbold)
- (Denmark) Isabella Mathorne (GK) (to (Denmark) Holstebro Håndbold)
- (Denmark) Astrid Lynnerup (LW) (to (Denmark) Ikast Håndbold)
- 32 (Denmark) Cecillie Kjær Lindgaard (LB) (to ?)
- (Faroe Islands) Súna Hansen (CB) (to (Montenegro) ZRK Buducnost)
- (Denmark) Nicoline Lauritsen (CB) (to (Denmark) SønderjyskE Damehåndbold)
- (Denmark) Frida Møller (RB) (to ?)
- (Denmark) Cecilie Specht (RB) (to ?)
- (Denmark) Emma Laursen (RW) (to (Denmark) Silkeborg-Voel KFUM)
- (Denmark) Emilie Schleicher (P) (to (Denmark) EH Aalborg)

== Notable former players ==
- (Iceland) Steinunn Hansdóttir
- (Sweden) Åsa Eriksson
- (Denmark) Kristina Jørgensen
- (Denmark) Trine Knudsen
- (Denmark) Anna Kristensen
- (Denmark) Laura Damgaard
- (Denmark) Sofie Blichert-Toft
- (Denmark) Sofie Alnor
- (Denmark) Mette Brandt Nielsen
- (Denmark) Sofia Deen
- (Denmark) Celine Holst Elkjær
- (Denmark) Stine Holm
- (Denmark) Annika Jakobsen
- (Denmark) Monika Kongsgaard
- (Denmark) Sarah Stougaard
- (Denmark) Amalie Wichmann
- (Denmark) Marie Aamand Sørensen
- (Denmark) Nicoline Olsen
- (Denmark) Edita Nukovic
- (Denmark) Sophie Moth
- (Denmark) Mette Lassen
- (Denmark) Sidsel Mejlvang
- (Denmark) Ida Mikkelsen
- (Denmark) Anna Wierzba
- (Denmark) Emilie Ytting
- (Denmark) Anna Kristensen
