= Klavs Bruun Jørgensen =

Danish handball player and coach (born 1974)

Personal information
- Nationality: Danish
- Born: 3 April 1974 (age 52) Copenhagen, Denmark
- Height: 1.84 m (6 ft 0 in)

Sport
- Sport: Handball
- Position: Right back

Senior clubs
- Years: Team
- –1998: Virum-Sorgenfri HK
- 1998–1999: SG Wallau-Massenheim
- 1999–2003: Virum-Sorgenfri HK
- 2003–2007: GOG
- 2007–2009: FCK Håndbold
- 2009–2010: AG København
National team
Years	Team	Apps	(Gls)
1994–2009	Denmark	185	(440)

Teams managed
- 2010–2011: AG København
- 2012: Nordsjælland Håndbold
- 2012–2015: TTH Holstebro
- 2015–2020: Denmark women's team
- 2021-: SønderjyskE Håndbold
Medal record
European Championship
Bronze medal – third place	2002 Sweden
Bronze medal – third place	2004 Slovenia

Klavs Bruun Jørgensen (born 3 April 1974) is a Danish handball player and coach.

== Playing career ==
As a player, he led FCK Håndbold to the Danish championship in May 2008. He has previously played for many years for Danish Handball League rivals GOG, with whom he won two Danish titles. For a short period he played for German league side SG Wallau-Massenheim.

== Coaching career ==
In his coaching career he has coached several men danish side clubs such as AG København, Nordsjælland Håndbold and Team Tvis Holstebro. On 13 January 2015 DHF announced the Klavs Bruun Jørgensen would take over as head coach of the danish women's national team as of 1 June 2015.

Jørgensen has played 168 matches for the Danish national handball team, and participated in the 2002 and 2004 European Men's Handball Championship, both times securing bronze medals.

Jørgensen is married to fellow handball player Rikke Hørlykke His two older siblings, Peter Bruun Jørgensen and Sisse Bruun Jørgensen are both former handballer players, who played on their respective national teams. All three players started at Virum-Sorgenfri HK as their parents where involved in the club.
