= Skanderborg AGF Håndbold =

Danish handball club

- Founded: 1982; 44 years ago
- Arena: Skanderborg Fælled and Ceres Arena
- Capacity: 1,700 / 5,001
- President: Mads Lind
- Head coach: Nick Rasmussen
- League: Håndboldligaen
- 2025–26: 2nd
- Club colours
Home	Away

Skanderborg AGF Håndbold, previously Skanderborg Aarhus Håndbold, is a men's handball club based in Skanderborg in Jutland, Denmark. The club was founded in 1982 as the result of a merger between Stilling-Skanderborg and Vrold-Skanderborg Handball Club.

The women's team still competes under the name Skanderborg Håndbold.

== History ==
In 2021, Aarhus Håndbold merged with Skanderborg Håndbold's men's team, and the club changed its name to Skanderborg Aarhus Håndbold. After the merger, the club inherited the league licence of Skanderborg Håndbold, while the first governing board consisted of four members from each former club. At the time, both Skanderborg Håndbold and Aarhus Håndbold were at the brink of bankruptcy due to lost income following the COVID-19 pandemic. The fusion was criticized from both fan bases, as Skanderborg fans disliked the composition of the new club board and Aarhus fans disliked the fact that the club played all their matches in Skanderborg.

Their first season was the 2021–22 Håndboldligaen. In their first season they reached the Championship play-off. In June 2023, the sports association Aarhus Gymnastikforening bought 50 percent of the club, prompting the name change to Skanderborg AGF Håndbold.

In the 2025-26 season, the club reached the Danish Championship semifinals for the first time in club history. They would go on to beat GOG Håndbold to reach their first ever final. They would however lose both finals to Aalborg Håndbold.

Location of Skanderborg AGF Håndbold

== Team ==
=== Staff ===
Staff for the 2025–26 season

Pos.	Name
Head coach	(Denmark) Nick Rasmussen
Assistant coach	(Denmark) Søren Fisker
Goalkeeping coach	(Denmark) Mads Sørensen
Physical coach	(Denmark) Thomas Cortebeeck
Mental coach	(Denmark) Jakob Freil
Physiotherapist	(Denmark) Kathja Rasmusen
Physiotherapist	(Denmark) Christina Maajen
Masseur	(Denmark) Claus Sørensen
Chiropractor	(Denmark) Jan Anders Sørensen
Team leader	(Denmark) Frank Jensen
Team leader	(Denmark) Kasper Voetmann
Team leader	(Denmark) Alex Sørensen

=== Current squad ===
Squad for the 2026–27 season

Goalkeeper

- 12 (Denmark) Magnus Brandbyge
- 21 (Denmark) Magnus Petersen

Wingers
LW

- 5 (Denmark) Alexander Jensen
- 25 (Denmark) Jeppe Cieslak

RW

- 26 (Denmark) Jóhan Hansen
- 29 (Denmark) Jacob Villemoes

Pivots

- 17 (Denmark) Andreas Søgaard
- 28 (Denmark) Morten Kaalund

Back players
LB

- 6 (Denmark) Kristian Bonefeld
- 7 (Denmark) Christoffer Dreyer
- 13 (Denmark) Gustav Bruun
- 15 (Denmark) Emil Lærke

CB

- 22 (Denmark) Jakob Rasmussen
- 32 (Sweden) Fredrik Olsson
- 33 (Norway) Tobias Mehren Søberg

RB

- 3 (Iceland) Kristján Örn Kristjánsson
- 14 (Denmark) Oscar Hansen

=== Transfers ===
Transfers for the 2026–27 season

Joining

- (Norway) Tobias Mehren Søberg (CB) from (Norway) Drammen HK
- (Denmark) Jakob Rasmussen (CB) from (Denmark) Skjern Håndbold
- (Denmark) Gustav Bruun (LB) from (Denmark) Nordsjælland Håndbold
- (Denmark) Jacob Villemoes (RW) from (Denmark) Grindsted GIF Håndbold

Leaving

- (Denmark) Silas Frank (RW) to (Denmark) TM Tønder
- (Denmark) Simon Sejr (GK) to ?
- (Denmark) Morten Balling (CB) Retires
- (Denmark) Sebastian Henneberg (CB) Retires
