= Fredericia Idrætscenter =

Indoor sports arena in Fredericia, Denmark

Coordinates: 55°34′36.92″N 9°43′38.91″E

Fredericia Idrætscenter is an indoor sports arena in Fredericia, Denmark, used for several sports, including handball. The arena can hold 2,225 spectators (app. 850 seated) and is home to Fredericia HK.
