= Herreligaen =

Handball league in Denmark

- Current season, competition or edition: 2025–26 Håndboldligaen
- Sport: Handball
- Founded: 1936; 90 years ago
- Administrator: DHF
- No. of teams: 14
- Country: Denmark
- Confederation: EHF
- Most recent champion: Aalborg Håndbold (9th title) (2025–26)
- Most titles: KIF Kolding (14 titles)
- Relegation to: 1st Division
- Domestic cup: Danish Cup
- International cups: EHF Champions League; EHF European League
- Website: tophaandbold.dk

The Herreligaen (men's league), formerly known as Herrehåndboldligaen (men's handball league), is the men's top Danish professional handball league. The winners of the Herreligaen are recognised as the Danish men's handball champions. The current champions are Aalborg Håndbold.

== History ==
Prior to 1946, four regional tournaments were arranged, and the winner of each of those met in an unofficial tournament. In 1939 Danmarks Idrætsforbund gave permission, making the 1939 championship the official Danish Championship and Handelsstandens Gymnastikforening the first official Danish Champions.

From the 1946-47 onwards national tournaments were arranged for the first time, called the 1st Division. There were attempts to make a proper national league in 1939, but they were halted by the German occupation of Denmark in the 2nd world war, and therefore the tournament kept its old structure during the war, and in 1945 it was outright cancelled. After the war the Danish Men's Handball League was created. In the beginning, the Copenhagen based clubs were dominant, and first in 1951 did Helsingør IF become the first club outside Copenhagen to win the Danish Championship.

From the 1998-99 season, the Håndboldligaen was created as the new first tier, relegating the 1st division to become a second tier.

In the late 50's and early 60's Aarhus became the dominant city with AGF Håndbold, Skovbakken and Aarhus KFUM winning multiple championships.

In the 70's Fredericia KFUM emerged as one of the strongest teams, and won 5 straight championships.

In the 80's, 90's and 2000's the league was dominated by a rivalry between KIF Kolding and GOG. Between 1986 and 2010 there was only a single Danish Championship final without either of the team, and there were 8 direct championship matches between them. The period ended when GOG went bankrupt in 2010.

In the 2010's Aalborg Håndbold emerged as the new superpower, winning their first championship in 2010, the second in 2013 and then 7 titles in 10 years between 2017 and 2026, only interrupted by Skjern Håndbold, and lately by GOG reemergence in the 2020's.

== Season ==
The Herreligaen season consists of 14 teams, each playing 26 regular season games. The eight best teams of the regular season advance to further games, where they are divided into two groups of four teams each. No. 1 and 2 from the regular season start with 2 points. No. 3 and 4 start with 1 point, while no. 5-8 start with no points. After these six games the two top teams in each group will play semifinals. No. 1 from one group is up against no. 2 from the other. The winners will meet in finals, while the losers will play against each other for the bronze medal. Semifinals, finals, and bronze games are all played in best of 3.

The lowest placed team of the regular season is directly relegated to the second-best division, and replaced by the winner of this. The teams finishing as 9, 10, 11, 12 and 13 are put in a group where they will play against each other. In the second-best division, the teams that end up 2nd and 3rd will play against each other in best of 3. The winner of those games will get to meet the lowest placed team from the 9-13 group from the top league, yet again in best of 3. The winner will get to play in the top league next season, while the loser plays in the second-best division.

== Teams ==
The teams for the 2024–25 season are:

| Team | Location | Arena | Capacity |
|---|---|---|---|
| Aalborg Håndbold | Aalborg | Jutlander Bank Arena | 5,009 |
| Bjerringbro-Silkeborg | Bjerringbro | Silkeborg-Hallerne | 2,845 |
| Fredericia HK | Fredericia | Fredericia Idrætscenter | 2,225 |
| Grindsted GIF Håndbold | Grindsted | Vestjysk Bank Arena | 500 |
| GOG | Gudme | Gudme-Hallerne | 2,265 |
| KIF Kolding | Kolding | Tre-For Arena | 5,182 |
| Mors-Thy | Nykøbing Mors Thisted | Jyske Bank Mors Arena Thy Hallen | 2,296 1,284 |
| Nordsjælland Håndbold | Helsinge; Hillerød | Helsinge-Hallen; Royal Stage | 1,600; 3,000 |
| Ribe-Esbjerg | Esbjerg Ribe | Blue Water Dokken Invactor Arena | 3,386 1,976 |
| Skanderborg Aarhus Håndbold | Skanderborg Aarhus | Fælledhallen Ceres Arena | 1,700 5,000 |
| Skjern | Skjern | Skjern Bank Arena | 3,264 |
| SønderjyskE | Sønderborg | Broager Sparekasse Skansen | 2,200 |
| TMS Ringsted | Ringsted | Poul Christensen Arena | 1,200 |
| TTH Holstebro | Holstebro | Idrætscenter Vest | 3,250 |

== Champions ==
The complete list of the Danish men's handball champions since 1936.

| Year | Winner (titles) | Top goalscorer (goals), club |
|---|---|---|
| 1935-36 | IF Vidar (1) | |
| 1936-37 | IF Ajax (1) | |
| 1937-38 | IF Vidar (2) | |
| 1938-39 | Handelsstandens Gymnastikforening (1) | |
| 1939-40 | Handelsstandens Gymnastikforening (2) | |
| 1940-41 | Handelsstandens Gymnastikforening (3) | |
| 1941-42 | IF Ajax (2) | |
| 1942-43 | Handelsstandens Gymnastikforening (4) | |
| 1943-44 | IF Ajax (3) | |
| 1944-45 | Season suspended | |
| 1945-46 | Handelsstandens Gymnastikforening (5) | |
| 1946-47 | Handelsstandens Gymnastikforening (6) | Svend Aage Madsen (36), IF Ajax |
| 1947-48 | IF Ajax (4) | Svend Aage Madsen (47), IF Ajax |
| 1948-49 | IF Ajax (5) | Per Theilmann (42), Helsingør IF |
| 1949-50 | IF Ajax (6) | Svend Aage Madsen (48), IF Ajax |
| 1950-51 | Helsingør IF (1) | Per Theilmann (56), Helsingør IF |
| 1951-52 | IF Ajax (7) | Per Theilmann (97), Helsingør IF |
| 1952-53 | IF Ajax (8) | Mogens Olsen (109), Aarhus KFUM |
| 1953-54 | Tarup HK (1) | Mogens Olsen (101), Aarhus KFUM |
| 1954-55 | Aarhus KFUM (1) | Mogens Olsen (130), Aarhus KFUM |
| 1955-56 | Handelsstandens Gymnastikforening (7) | Mogens Olsen (128), Aarhus KFUM |
| 1956-57 | AGF (1) | Mogens Olsen (144), Aarhus KFUM |
| 1957-58 | Helsingør IF (2) | Mogens Olsen (162), Aarhus KFUM |
| 1958-59 | AGF (2) | Mogens Olsen (178), Aarhus KFUM |
| 1959-60 | Handelsstandens Gymnastikforening (8) | Jens Ove Hansen (144), IF Stjernen |
| 1960-61 | AGF (3) | Max Nielsen (127), MK 31 |
| 1961-62 | Skovbakken (1) | Jørgen P. Hansen (128), Tarup Pårup IF; Peter Nielsen (128), IF Ajax |
| 1962-63 | Aarhus KFUM (2) | Mogens Olsen (102), Aarhus KFUM |
| 1963-64 | IF Ajax (9) | USG |
| 1964-65 | AGF (4) | Jørgen Petersen (142), H.G. Handball |
| 1965-66 | Handelsstandens Gymnastikforening (9) | Mogens Olsen (122), Aarhus KFUM |
| 1966-67 | Handelsstandens Gymnastikforening (10) | Jørgen Petersen (118), H.G. Handball |
| 1967-68 | Handelsstandens Gymnastikforening (11) | Karl Erik Jørgensen (131), IF Stjernen |
| 1968-69 | Handelsstandens Gymnastikforening (12) | Hans Jørn Graversen (132), Skovbakken |
| 1969-70 | Handelsstandens Gymnastikforening (13) | Hans Jørn Graversen (128), Skovbakken |
| 1970-71 | Efterslægten (1) | Flemming Hansen (161), Fredericia KFUM |
| 1971-72 | IF Stadion (1) | Flemming Hansen (97), Fredericia KFUM |
| 1972-73 | IF Stadion (2) | Flemming Hansen (152), Fredericia KFUM |
| 1973-74 | Aarhus KFUM (3) | Flemming Hansen (137), Fredericia KFUM |
| 1974-75 | Fredericia KFUM (1) | Flemming Hansen (109), Fredericia KFUM |
| 1975-76 | Fredericia KFUM (2) | Flemming Hansen (136), Fredericia KFUM |
| 1976-77 | Fredericia KFUM (3) | Michael Jørn Berg (168), Holte IF |
| 1977-78 | Fredericia KFUM (4) | Michael Jørn Berg (201), Holte IF |
| 1978-79 | Fredericia KFUM (5) | Michael Jørn Berg (148), Holte IF |
| 1979-80 | Aarhus KFUM (4) | Michael Jørn Berg (141), Holte IF |
| 1980-81 | Helsingør IF (3) | Michael Jørn Berg (148), Holte IF |
| 1981-82 | Skovbakken (2) | Bjarne Jeppesen (117), Fredericia KFUM |
| 1982-83 | Aarhus KFUM (5) | Erik Veje Rasmussen (121), Helsingør IF |
| 1983-84 | Gladsaxe/HG (1) | Michael Jørn Berg (125), Holte IF |
| 1984-85 | Helsingør IF (4) | Michael Jørn Berg (101), Holte IF; Hans Henrik Hattesen (101), Virum-Sorgenfri HK |
| 1985-86 | Hellerup IK (1) | Flemming Hansen (100), Helsingør IF |
| 1986-87 | Kolding IF (1) | Flemming Hansen (98), Helsingør IF |
| 1987-88 | Kolding IF (2) | Kim G. Jacobsen (105), Kolding IF |
| 1988-89 | Helsingør IF (5) | John Mortensen (112), Nyborg GIF |
| 1989-90 | Kolding IF (3) | Otto Mertz (107), Kolding IF |
| 1990-91 | Kolding IF (4) | John Jacobsen (150), Ribe HK |
| 1991-92 | GOG (1) | Per Sabroe Thomsen (121), GOG |
| 1992-93 | Kolding IF (5) | Fritz Thomsen (141), Aalborg KFUM |
| 1993-94 | Kolding IF (6) | Kim Keller Christensen (170), Virum-Sorgenfri HK |
| 1994-95 | GOG (2) | Jan Paulsen (168), HK Roar |
| 1995-96 | GOG (3) | Klavs Bruun Jørgensen (167), Virum-Sorgenfri HK |
| 1996-97 | Virum-Sorgenfri HK (1) | Nikolaj Jacobsen (205), GOG |
| 1997-98 | GOG (4) | Lars E. Jørgensen (142), HK Roar |
| 1998-99 | Skjern Håndbold (1) | Ole Nielsen (158), Team Esbjerg |
| 1999-2000 | GOG (5) | Brian Jensen (140), Vrold/Skanderborg HK |
| 2000-01 | Kolding IF (7) | Bilal Šuman (178), Kolding IF |
| 2001-02 | KIF Kolding (8) | Heins Kart Pedersen (172), Bjerringbro FH |
| 2002-03 | KIF Kolding (9) | Lars Rasmussen (179), Ajax/Farum |
| 2003-04 | GOG (6) | Micke Næsby (227), Fredericia HK |
| 2004-05 | KIF Kolding (10) | Robert Gunnarsson (241), Århus GF |
| 2005-06 | KIF Kolding (11) | Jesper Nøddesbo (178), KIF Kolding |
| 2006-07 | GOG (7) | Hans Lindberg (187), Viborg HK |
| 2007-08 | FCK Håndbold (1) | Milutin Dragićević (177), Bjerringbro-Silkeborg |
| 2008-09 | KIF Kolding (12) | Fredrik Petersen (171), GOG |
| 2009-10 | AaB Håndbold (1) | Claus Møller Jakobsen (149), Skjern |
| 2010-11 | AG København (1) | Jonas Larholm (160) AaB Håndbold |
| 2011-12 | AG København (2) | Michael Pedersen (184), Skive fH |
| 2012-13 | Aalborg Håndbold (2) | Jeppe Riber (196), Ribe-Esbjerg HH |
| 2013-14 | KIF Kolding Copenhagen (13) | Henrik Møllgaard (228), Skjern |
| 2014-15 | KIF Kolding Copenhagen (14) | Nikolaj Ø. Nielsen (205), Bjerringbro-Silkeborg |
| 2015-16 | Bjerringbro-Silkeborg (1) | Patrick Wiesmach Larsen (217), Team Tvis Holstebro |
| 2016-17 | Aalborg Håndbold (3) | Sander Sagosen (206), Aalborg Håndbold; Jacob Holm (206), Ribe-Esbjerg HH |
| 2017-18 | Skjern Håndbold (2) | Nikolaj Ø. Nielsen (202), Bjerringbro-Silkeborg |
| 2018-19 | Aalborg Håndbold (4) | Anders Eggert (223), Skjern |
| 2019-20 | Aalborg Håndbold (5) | Nikolaj Læsø (153), Aarhus Håndbold |
| 2020-21 | Aalborg Håndbold (6) | Emil Jakobsen (244), GOG |
| 2021-22 | GOG Håndbold (8) | Jerry Tollbring (266), GOG |
| 2022-23 | GOG Håndbold (9) | Emil Wernsdorf Madsen (252), GOG |
| 2023-24 | Aalborg Håndbold (7) | Emil Wernsdorf Madsen (192), GOG |
| 2024-25 | Aalborg Håndbold (8) | Nicolaj Jørgensen (275), SønderjyskE Herrehåndbold |
| 2025-26 | Aalborg Håndbold (9) | Frederik Bjerre (283), GOG |

== Total titles won ==
The following clubs have won the Danish championship.

| Club | Winners |
|---|---|
| KIF Kolding | 14 |
| Handelsstandens Gymnastikforening | 13 |
| IF Ajax | 9 |
| GOG | 9 |
| Aalborg Håndbold | 9 |
| Helsingør IF | 5 |
| Aarhus KFUM | 5 |
| Fredericia KFUM | 5 |
| AGF | 4 |
| Skjern Håndbold | 2 |
| AG København | 2 |
| Skovbakken | 2 |
| IF Stadion | 2 |
| IF Vidar | 2 |
| Bjerringbro-Silkeborg | 1 |
| FCK Håndbold | 1 |
| Virum-Sorgenfri HK | 1 |
| Hellerup IK | 1 |
| Gladsaxe/HG | 1 |
| Efterslægten | 1 |
| Tarup HK | 1 |

== EHF coefficients ==
The following data indicates Danish coefficient rankings between European handball leagues.

Country ranking

EHF League Ranking for 2021/22 season:

- 5. (3) (North Macedonia) Super Liga (93.00)
- 6. (6) (Poland) Polish Superliga (77.00)
- 7. (6) (Denmark) Danish Handball League (74.50)
- 8. (9) (Portugal) 1ª Divisão (69.00)
- 9. (8) (Croatia) Croatian Premier Handball League (46.33)

Club ranking

EHF Club Ranking as of 25 September 2025:

- 5. Aalborg (513)
- 15. GOG (330)
- 43. Bjerringbro-Silkeborg (106)
- 47. Skjern (98)
- 55. Fredericia (87)

== Names ==
The Danish Handball League has had several different names due to the main sponsor changing:

- 1998–2001: Byggekram Ligaen
- 11/2001–2004: TDC Ligaen
- 1/2007–2008: Tele2 Ligaen
- 2008–2009: CBB Mobil Ligaen
- 2009–2013: Jack & Jones Ligaen
- 2014–2016: Boxer TV Ligaen
- 2016–2018: 888.dk Ligaen
- 2019–2020: Primo Tours Ligaen
- 11/2020–2023: HTH Ligaen
- 2025–: Bambuni Ligaen

== See also ==
- Danish Women's Handball League
