= Michael Jørn Berg =

Danish handball player (born 1955)

Michael Berg
Personal information
- Full name: Michael Jørn Berg
- Nationality: Danish
- Born: 29 May 1955 (age 71) Hørsholm, Favrskov Municipality
- Height: 186 cm (73 in)

Sport
- Sport: Handball
- Position: Back

Senior clubs
- Years: Team
- 1973–1981: Holte IF
National team
Years	Team	Apps	(Gls)
1973–1981	Denmark	90	(313)

Michael Jørn Berg (born 29 May 1955) is a Danish former handball player who competed in the 1980 Summer Olympics.

In 1980 he finished ninth with the Danish team in the Olympic tournament. He played all six matches and scored 16 goals.

In club handball he played the entire career at Holte IF. Here he won silver medals three times in the 1970's. In 7 seasons he was the league top scorer, with his best year being 1978 where he scored 201 goals. He was awarded the male player of the year by the Håndbold Spiller Foreningen in 1978 and 1981.

He debuted for the national team in 1973, but had to wait three years for his second match. But from 1976 he was a regular on the national team for the next 5 years. Berg initially retired from the national team in 1980, but decided to return in 1981 playing another year.
