= Eslövs IK =

Swedish sports club

- Full name: Eslövs Idrottsklubb
- Short name: EIK
- Founded: 1961
- Arena: Eslövshallen, Eslöv
- Capacity: 1,500
- League: Allsvenskan
- Club colours
Home	Away

Eslövs IK is a sports club in Eslöv, Sweden, established in 1961. The club nowadays mostly runs handball activity. The women's team won the Swedish national indoor championship titles in 2002 and 2003.

The women's team plays under the name Eslövs IK (up to 2002 Team Skåne EIK). The club also runs the women's Division 2 team 'Eslövstjejerna'.

Location of Eslövs IK

== Sports Hall information ==
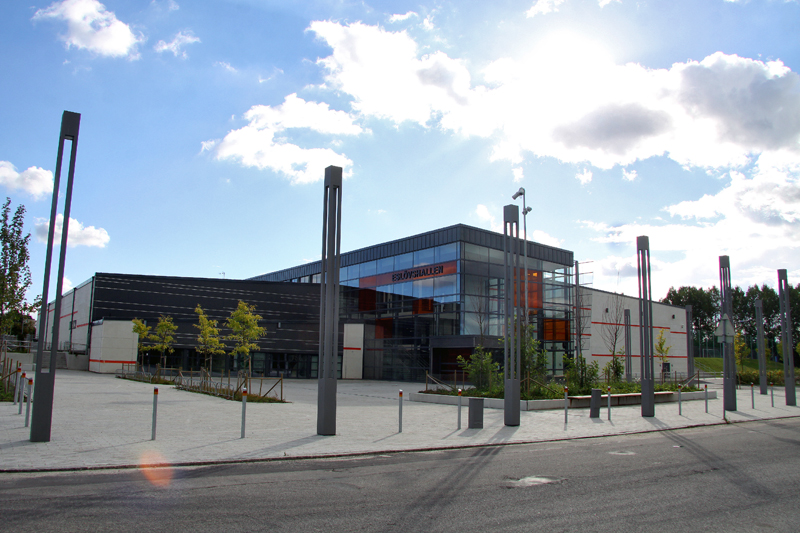
Home hall: Eslövshallen

- Name: – Eslövshallen
- City: – Eslöv
- Capacity: – 1500
- Address: – Onsjövägen 3, 241 34 Eslöv, Sweden

== Kits ==
HOME
2011-12	2015-16	2017-20	2020-

AWAY
2016-18	2019-20
