= 1962–63 Women's European Cup (handball) =

1962–63 Women's Handball European Cup
Tournament details
- Dates: 30 November 1962 – 14 April 1963
- Teams: 12 (knockout stage)

Final positions
- Champions: (Soviet Union) Trud Moscow
- Runners-up: (Denmark) Frederiksberg IF

Tournament statistics
- Matches played: 11

The 1962–63 Women's Handball European Champions Cup was the third edition of the premier international competition for European women's handball clubs, taking place from November 1962 to April 1963. Fourteen teams took part in the competition, with Denmark, East Germany, Hungary, Netherlands and Sweden making its first appearance, so a first round was introduced. 1962 champion and runner-up Czechoslovakia and Yugoslavia were granted byes for the quarter-finals. For the first time the final was carried out as a single match, taking place in Prague on April 14.

Trud Moscow, representing the Soviet Union as the first champion of the newly founded Soviet Championship, became the first of three Soviet teams to win the competition by beating Ruch Chorzów, defending champion Spartak Prague Sokolovo and finally Frederiksberg IF, which was the first team from Western Europe to reach the final.

== First round ==
Team #1	Agg.	Team #2	1st leg	2nd leg
ČKD Prague (Czechoslovakia)	11 – 5	(Austria) Danubia Wien	9 – 3	2 – 2
Fortschritt Weissenfels (East Germany)	22 – 9	(Sweden) Ymer	14 – 3	8 – 6
Ruch Chorzów (Poland)	18 – 26	(Soviet Union) Trud Moscow	11 – 11	7 – 15
Spartak Prague (Czechoslovakia)	Bye
Frederiksberg (Denmark)	17 – 10	(Germany) Südwest 1947	9 – 4	8 – 6
Budapesti Spartacus (Hungary)	8 – 20	(Romania) Rapid Bucharest	2 – 4	6 – 16
Niloc Amsterdam (Netherlands)	14 – 13	(France) Ivry	8 – 6	6 – 7
Lokomotiva Zagreb (Socialist Federal Republic of Yugoslavia)	Bye

== Quarter-finals ==
Team #1	Agg.	Team #2	1st leg	2nd leg
ČKD Prague (Czechoslovakia)	14 – 15	(East Germany) Fortschritt Weissenfels	8 – 8	6 – 7
Trud Moscow (Soviet Union)	17 – 15	(Czechoslovakia) Spartak Prague	8 – 7	9 – 8
Frederiksberg (Denmark)	30 – 13	(Netherlands) Niloc Amsterdam	17 – 7	13 – 6
Rapid Bucharest (Romania)	19 – 14	(Socialist Federal Republic of Yugoslavia) Lokomotiva Zagreb	13 – 8	6 – 6

== Semifinals ==
Team #1	Agg.	Team #2	1st leg	2nd leg
Fortschritt Weissenfels (East Germany)	16 – 19	(Soviet Union) Trud Moscow	10 – 7	6 – 12
Frederiksberg (Denmark)	14 – 13	(Romania) Rapid Bucharest	11 – 7	3 – 6

== Final ==
Date	Team #1	Result	Team #2
14.04.1963	Trud Moscow (Soviet Union)	11 – 8	(Denmark) Frederiksberg

Women's Handball European Cup
1962–63 Winner

(Soviet Union) Trud Moscow
First title
