= FCK Håndbold =

Danish handball club

- Full name: F.C. København Håndbold
- Short name: FCK
- Founded: 2002; 24 years ago
- Dissolved: 2010; 16 years ago
- Arena: Frederiksberghallen
- Capacity: 1,767
- Club colours
| Home | Away |

F.C. Copenhagen Handball (or simply FCK Handball) was a Danish handball team, playing in Copenhagen. They had both a male and a female team, both playing in the best Danish leagues, the Danish Handball League (men) and Danish Women's Handball League (women). FCK Handball was owned by Parken Sport & Entertainment - the same company behind the football team, F.C. Copenhagen.

The official fan club was called FCKHFC (FC København Håndbold Fan Club).

== History ==
The team was founded on 7 June 2002, after FC Copenhagen had acquired the playing licence of former Danish champions Frederiksberg IF. Both the men's and women's team played regularly in the top flight. The Danish handball icon Anja Andersen was brought in as the head coach. The clubs biggest achievement was winning the Danish Men's Handball League in 2007-08. In 2008-09 they reached the final again, where they lost to KIF Kolding.

After the 2009–10 season, Parken Sport & Entertainment returned the license to Frederiksberg IF. The male team squad became a part of AG København, when they fused with AG Håndbold. The women's team, both players and coaches, were released of their contracts.

AG København then went on to win two Danish Championships, before they declared bankruptcy and became a part of KIF Kolding København.

== Notable former players ==
=== Women's ===
- (Sweden) Matilda Boson
- (Sweden) Madeleine Grundström
- (Sweden) Johanna Wiberg
- (Sweden) Lina Möller
- (Sweden) Sara Holmgren
- (Sweden) Sara Eriksson
- (Hungary) Katalin Pálinger
- (Hungary) Anita Bulath
- (Hungary) Eszter Siti
- (Russia) Emiliya Turey
- (Russia) Anna Andryushchenko
- (Norway) Linn-Kristin Riegelhuth
- (Norway) Cecilie Leganger
- (Norway) Sölvi Hylleseth
- (Brazil) Chana Masson
- (Germany) Nadine Krause
- (Germany) Maren Baumbach
- (Romania) Carmen Amariei
- (Romania) Steluța Luca
- (Serbia) Tanja Milanović
- (Serbia) Ana Batinic
- (Serbia) Suzana Cubela
- (Montenegro) Maja Savić
- (Denmark) Camilla Andersen
- (Denmark) Sofie Bloch-Sørensen
- (Denmark) Marianne Bonde
- (Denmark) Christina Pedersen
- (Denmark) Mia Rej
- (Denmark) Mia Falk
- (Denmark) Mette Sjøberg
- (Denmark) Mette Vestergaard
- (Denmark) Josephine Touray
- (Denmark) Jonas Atwood Christensen Jr.
- (Denmark) Mette Melgaard
- (Denmark) Christina Krogshede
- (Denmark) Lene Tobiasen
- (Denmark) Louise Lyksborg
- (Denmark) Karina Jespersen
- (Netherlands) Elly an de Boer
- (France) Leila Lejeune

=== Men's ===
- (Denmark) Kasper Hvidt
- (Denmark) Klavs Bruun Jørgensen
- (Denmark) Simon Hammer
- (Denmark) Jacob Bagersted
- (Sweden) Martin Boquist
- (Sweden) Pelle Linders
- (Sweden) Fredrik Lindahl
- (Norway) Steiner Ege
- (Norway) Einar Riegelhuth Koren
- (Norway) Erlend Mamelund
- (Iceland) Arnór Atlason
- (Croatia) Valter Matošević

== Coaching history ==
| (Denmark) | Morten Soubak | 2003–2005 |
| (Denmark) | Thomas Hylle | 2005–2008 |
| (Denmark) | Anja Andersen | 2008–2010 |
