= Frederiksberg IF =

Danish sports club

- Full name: Frederiksberg Idræts-Forening
- Short name: FIF
- Founded: February 24, 1913; 113 years ago
- Arena: Frederiksberghallen
- Capacity: 1,767
- Head coach: Jesper Monrad
- League: Danish 1st Division
- 2024-25: 7th
- Club colours
Home	Away

Frederiksberg Idræts-Forening, often just called Frederiksberg IF or FIF is a Danish sports club based in Frederiksberg. The club has teams in many different sports, but is most famous for its handball team. The men's team is currently playing in the second tier, Danish 1st Division.

The official fan group is called FIF Ultras.

== History ==
The club was founded on 24 February 1913, while the handball department was founded in 1935.

The women's handball team has won the Danish Women's Handball League 12 times, most of them being in the 1950's, 60's and 70's. They last won the Danish championship in 1989. They used to have the record for most titles, until Viborg HK won their 13th title in the 2009-10 season. They still hold the record for most cup titles in Denmark with 11. In the 1960's several Frederiksberg based club were dominant in Danish handball.

From 2002 to 2010 FCK Håndbold played on FIF's license.

Since 2014, København Håndbold has been playing on FIF's license in the Danish Women's Handball League.

The club has raised a host of A-national team players on both sides, with Camilla Andersen, Mette Vestergaard, Anne-Marie Nielsen, Toni Røseler Andersen, Bo Spellerberg and Kasper Hvidt as some of the most prominent.

== Titles ==
- EHF Women's Champions League
  - Second place: 1963
- Danish Women's Handball League
  - Winner: (12) 1956, 1959, 1962, 1966, 1967, 1971, 1972, 1973, 1974, 1976, 1978, 1980, 1981, 1985, 1989
  - Second place: (8) 1967, 1968, 1969, 1975, 1977, 1979, 1990, 2000
  - Third place: (6) 1982, 1983, 1991, 1992, 1993, 1998
- Danish Women's Handball Cup
  - Winner: (11) 1964, 1965, 1967, 1969, 1970, 1972, 1973, 1982, 1985, 1995, 1997
  - Second place: (8) 1966, 1975, 1984, 1988, 1989, 1991, 1992, 1998
- Danish Men's Handball Cup
  - Second place: (2) 1974, 1999

== Notable former players ==
- Mette Vestergaard
- Bo Spellerberg
- Camilla Andersen
- Birgitte Wilbek
- Anne-Marie Nielsen
- Toni Røseler Andersen
- Frida Jensen
- Josephine Touray
- Karin Mortensen
- Rikke Hørlykke
- Mads Mensah Larsen
- Lene Rantala
- Marianne Bonde
- Christina Pedersen
- Alexander Lynggaard
- Karina Jespersen
