= Fredericia HK =

Danish handball club

- Full name: Fredericia Håndboldklub
- Short name: FHK
- Founded: 1990
- Arena: thansen.dk Arena
- Capacity: 2,225
- President: Thomas Renneberg-Larsen
- Head coach: Jesper Houmark
- League: Herrehåndboldligaen
- 2024–25: 5th
- Club colours
Home	Away

Fredericia HK is a handball club from Fredericia, Denmark. Currently, Fredericia HK competes in the men's Danish Handball League. The home arena of the team is thansen.dk Arena. The club was founded in 1990 on the license of former 5 time Danish champions Fredericia KFUM.

== History ==
=== Fredericia KFUM ===
The progenitor club, Fredericia KFUM, was founded in 1916. During the 1970s Fredericia KFUM was one of the best clubs in the country and contributed many players to the Danish men's national team, including Jørgen Heidemann, Flemming Ladefoged Hansen, Søren Andersen, Anders Dahl-Nielsen and Bjarne Jeppesen. The club won 5 straight Danish championships from 1975 to 1979 and won the Danish cup 6 times in 7 years from 1971 to 1977. In 1976 the club reached the final of the European Cup, but lost to Borac Banja Luka in the final.

=== Fusion ===
In 1990 Fredericia KFUM and FFF fused to create Fredericia HK under the name Fredericia Håndboldklub af 1990 on the license of Fredercia KFUM. Both teams had fallen down into the second tier, and the fusion was intended to bring them back to the top of Danish handball again.

In the 2001-02 season the team was promoted to the Herrehåndboldligaen again. The following season the club survived in 11th out of 13.

=== Relegations and Bankruptcy ===
During the 2007-08 season the club fired head coach Nick Rasmussen, after he had publicly criticized the club. That in turn led the player Micke Næsby to publicly criticize the club, and he left them at the end of the season.

In 2008 the club nearly went bankrupt due to a debt of 2.7 million DKR. The club was however saved by the bell, partly due to a new main sponsor and partly due to donation from their fan club.

In the 2010-11 season the team was surprisingly relegated after finishing 9th and losing the relegation playoff. As a consequence the entire club board resigned. The season after they were relegated again from the 1st Division to the 2nd Division. In 2012 the club went bankrupt and the leadership of the club was overtaken by FHK 90. The club were relegated to Jyllandsserien, the fifth tier of Danish handball.

In 2012-13 they were promoted to the 3. Division, and in 2014–15 to the 2nd Division. They were helped by former league players Paw Peters and Kasper Findahl. In the 2015-16 the club were already favourites to be promoted to the 1st Division, together with HC Odense. They were promoted with 3 matches to spare in front of 1,200 spectators.

In their first and second seasons in the 1st Division, they finished 6th on both occasions. In the 2018-19 season the team won the 1st Division, after beating Ajax København 30-26 with 4 rounds to go.

In September 2017 the 'af 1990' was removed from the club name.

=== 2019-today ===
In 2019, the team promoted to the Danish Men's Handball League after eight years competing in the 1st Division. A few seasons later, they made their way to the top tier position of the league, surprisingly claiming a bronze medal in the 2022-23 season. The season after they won silver medals.

In 2024 the club ownership model was reformed and the ownership was transferred to the company FHK 2024 A/S.

== Rivalries and fan clubs ==
The club has a rivalry with Kolding IF. The official fan club is called HK Ultras, and was founded in 2005.

== Achievements ==
- Danish Championship
  - Winners (5): 1975, 1976, 1977, 1978, 1979
  - Silver (1): 1980, 2024
  - Bronze (2): 1974, 2023
- Danish Cup
  - Winners (7): 1971, 1972, 1973, 1974, 1976, 1977, 1982
  - Finalist (1): 1979
- Limburgse Handbal Dagen
  - Winners (1): 2003

== Men's team ==
=== Staff ===
Pos.	Name
Coach	(Denmark) Jesper Houmark
Assistant Coach	(Denmark) Henrik Wollesen
Goalkeeping coach	(Denmark) Johnny Ebbesen
Team Leader	(Denmark) Jan Jochumsen
Physical trainer	(Denmark) Thomas Padkær
Physiotherapist	(Denmark) Flemming Smidt
Physiotherapist	(Denmark) Helena Vang
Physiotherapist	(Denmark) Maja Daugård

=== Current squad ===
Squad for the 2026–27 season

GK

- 1 (Denmark) Magnus Siim Pedersen
- 16 (Norway) Sander Heieren
- 24 (Denmark) Kalle Nissen Møller
- 30 (Norway) Torbjørn Bergerud

Wingers
LW

- 9 (Denmark) Martin Bisgaard
- 11 (Denmark) Morten Jørgensen

RW

- 7 (Denmark) Kasper Young Andersen
- 17 (Denmark) Malthe Rolighed Bull

Pivots

- 4 (Denmark) Julius Mørch
- 5 (Norway) Kristian Hübert Larsen
- 19 (Norway) Henrik Jakobsen

Back players
LB

- 6 (Denmark) Mads Thymann
- 15 (Denmark) Mads Kjeldgaard Andersen
- 18 (Denmark) Malthe Hejsel
- 20 (Denmark) Jeffrey Asamoah-Larsen
- 95 (Sweden) Pelle Segertoft

CB

- 22 (Sweden) Adam Ljungquist
- 31 (Sweden) William Andersson Moberg

RB

- 91 (Sweden) Kasper Palmar
- 93 (Denmark) Anders Kragh Martinusen

=== Transfers ===
Transfers for the 2027–28 season

Joining

- (Denmark) Jonas Kruse Kristensen (CB) (back from loan at (Sweden) IFK Skövde)
- (Denmark) Niclas Kirkeløkke (RB) (from (Germany) SG Flensburg-Handewitt)

Leaving

=== Transfer History ===
Transfers for the 2026–27 season

Joining

- (Norway) Torbjørn Bergerud (GK) from (Poland) Wisła Płock
- (Norway) Henrik Jakobsen (LP) from (Denmark) GOG Håndbold
- (Denmark) Malthe Rolighed Bull (RW) from (Denmark) Mors-Thy Håndbold
- (Denmark) Morten Jørgensen (LW) from (Denmark) Ribe-Esbjerg HH
- (Denmark) Magnus Siim Pedersen (GK) from (Denmark) TM Tønder
- (Denmark) Julius Mørch (LP) from (Denmark) Nordsjælland Håndbold

Leaving

- (Germany) Evgeni Pevnov (LP) to (Denmark) TMS Ringsted
- (Spain) Rolando Uríos González (LP) to (Spain) BM Proin Triana
- (Norway) Fredrik Mossestad (RW) (retires)
- (Denmark) Sebastian Frandsen (GK) to (Denmark) Bjerringbro-Silkeborg Håndbold
- (Denmark) Rasmus Storm Jensen (GK) to (Denmark) KIF Kolding
- (Denmark) Frederik Jaegerum (LW) to (Denmark) Grindsted GIF Håndbold
- (Denmark) Rasmus Qualmann Andersen (LB) to (Norway) Bodø HK
- (Denmark) Jonas Kruse Kristensen (CB) on loan at (Sweden) IFK Skövde

Transfers for the 2025–26 season

Joining

- (Norway) Sander Heieren (GK) from (Denmark) TTH Holstebro
- (Sweden) Pelle Segertoft (LB) from (Sweden) Önnereds HK
- (Iceland) Arnór Viðarsson (LB) (back from loan at (Germany) Bergischer HC)
- (Norway) Kristian Hübert Larsen (LP) from (Norway) Elverum Håndball
- (Spain) Rolando Uríos González (LP) from (Spain) CB Ciudad de Logroño

Leaving

- (Iceland) Einar Ólafsson (LB) to (Germany) HSV Hamburg
- (Netherlands) (Cuba) Reinier Taboada (LB) to (Portugal) S.L. Benfica
- (Norway) Lasse Balstad (LP) to (Denmark) GOG Håndbold
- (Denmark) Thorsten Fries (GK) to (Denmark) KIF Kolding
- (Denmark) Mads Hyldahl (LW) (to ?)
- (Denmark) Sebastian Henneberg (LB) to (Denmark) Skanderborg AGF Håndbold
- (Iceland) Arnór Viðarsson (LB) to (Sweden) HF Karlskrona
- (Denmark) Rasmus Peluffo Johansen (LB) to (Denmark) HC København
- (Denmark) Anton Filtenborg (RW) (to ?)
- (Denmark) Nikolaj A. Nielsen (LP) (to ?)
- (Denmark) Mads Emil Winterskov Møller (LP) (to (Denmark) TM Tønder)
