= 2014–15 Håndboldligaen =

Handball league season

Håndboldligaen
- Season: 2014–15
- Champions: KIF Kolding Copenhagen (14th title)
- Relegated: Odder Håndbold; Lemvig-Thyborøn
- Champions League: KIF Kolding Copenhagen; Skjern Håndbold (Wildcard)
- EHF Cup: Bjerringbro-Silkeborg; Team Tvis Holstebro
- Matches: 218
- Goals: 11,388 (52.24 per match)
- Top goalscorer: (Denmark) Nikolaj Ø. Nielsen (205 goals)
- Biggest home win: GOG 40–25 Odder; Mors-Thy 31–16 Odder
- Biggest away win: Odder 19–41 GOG
- Highest scoring: SønderjyskE 35–34 GOG

The 2014–15 Håndboldligaen (known as the Boxer Herreligaen for sponsorship reasons) was the 79th season of the Håndboldligaen, Denmark's premier Handball league.

KIF Kolding København won the championship, when they beat Skjern Håndbold in the final. Odder Håndbold was relegated, as they finished last in the regular season. Lemvig-Thyborøn Håndbold was also relegated, as they finished 12th in the regular season, and afterwards lost the promotion/relegation play-off to Skive fH.

== Team information ==
Locations of the 2014–15 Håndboldligaen

The following 14 clubs compete in the Håndboldligaen during the 2014–15 season:

Team	Location	Arena	Capacity
AaB Håndbold	Aalborg	Gigantium	4,500
Aarhus Håndbold	Aarhus	NRGi Arena	4,700
Bjerringbro-Silkeborg	Bjerringbro	Silkeborg-Hallerne	3,900
GOG	Gudme	Gudme-Hallerne	2,645
HC Midtjylland	Herning	Sportscenter Herning	1,600
KIF Kolding Copenhagen	Kolding	Tre-For Arena; Brøndby Hall	2,650; 4,500
Lemvig-Thyborøn	Lemvig	Vestjysk BANK Arena	1,400
Mors-Thy	Nykøbing Mors	Jyske Bank Mors Arena	1,500
Odder	Odder	Spektrum Odder	700
Ribe-Esbjerg	Ribe	Ribe Fritidscenter	2,200
Skanderborg	Skanderborg	Morten Børup Hallen	550
Skjern	Skjern	Skjern Bank Arena	2,400
SønderjyskE	Sønderborg	Broager Sparekasse Skansen	2,200
Tvis Holstebro	Holstebro	Idrætscenter Vest	3,250

=== Personnel and kits ===
Following is the list of clubs competing in 2014–15 Håndboldligaen, with their manager, captain, kit manufacturer and shirt sponsor.

Team	President	Head coach	Kit manufacturer	Shirt sponsor
AaB Håndbold	Jan Larsen	(Denmark) Jesper Jensen	hummel	Jutlander Bank
Aarhus Håndbold	Henrik Lundorff	(Denmark) Erik Veje Rasmussen	hummel	Sparkassen Kronjylland, Jytas
Bjerringbro-Silkeborg	Frank Lajer	(Denmark) Peter Bredsdorff-Larsen	adidas	Jyske Bank, Grundfos
GOG	Kasper Jørgensen	(Greenland) Jakob Larsen	hummel	Daloon, Fyske Bank
HC Midtjylland	Allan Witt	(Finland) Patrick Westerholm	hummel	eptools, KP Industri
KIF Kolding Copenhagen	Jens Boesen	(Iceland) Aron Kristjánsson	Kempa	TREFOR
Lemvig-Thyborøn	Troels Banggaard	(Denmark) Arne Damgaard	hummel	Vestjysk Bank
Mors-Thy	Johannes Søndergaard	(Denmark) Jan Paulsen	hummel	Jyske Bank
Odder	Henrik Bentsen	(Denmark) Morten Secher	hummel	Kvickly
Ribe-Esbjerg	Rikke Tangaa	(Denmark) Sune Agerschou	hummel	fros
Skanderborg	Jens Christensen	(Denmark) Nicolej Krickau	Puma	AVR, Skanderborg kommune
Skjern	Henning Kjærgaard	(Denmark) Ole Nørgaard	Puma	Skjern Bank
SønderjyskE	Klaus B. Rasmussen	(Denmark) Morten Henriksen	Diadora	SeaDane Travel
Tvis Holstebro	Jacob Ørngreen Jørgensen	(Denmark) Klavs Bruun Jørgensen	hummel	Vestjysk Bank

== Regular season ==
=== Standings ===
	Team	Pld	W	D	L	GF	GA	Diff	Pts
1	KIF Kolding Copenhagen	26	22	1	3	741	613	+128	45
2	Aalborg Håndbold	26	17	4	5	657	602	+55	38
3	Bjerringbro-Silkeborg	26	17	1	8	674	634	+40	35
4	Team Tvis Holstebro	26	16	2	8	743	668	+75	34
5	Skjern Håndbold	26	14	4	8	747	691	+56	32
6	HC Midtjylland	26	11	6	9	670	661	+9	28
7	GOG Håndbold	26	11	5	10	706	672	+34	27
8	Aarhus Håndbold	26	12	3	11	691	690	+1	27
9	Ribe-Esbjerg HH	26	11	3	12	630	626	+4	25
10	Mors-Thy Håndbold	26	12	0	14	631	638	-7	24
11	SønderjyskE Herrer	26	11	2	13	664	696	−32	24
12	Lemvig-Thyborøn	26	5	1	20	665	776	−111	11
13	Skanderborg Håndbold	26	5	0	21	647	733	−86	10
14	Odder Håndbold	26	1	2	23	635	801	−166	4

Championship Round
Relegation Round
Relegation

Pld - Played; W - Won; L - Lost; GF - Goals for; GA - Goals against; Diff - Difference; Pts - Points.

! There's a new relegation playoff made in November 2014

=== Schedule and results ===
In the table below the home teams are listed on the left and the away teams along the top.

	AaB Håndbold	Aarhus Håndbold	Bjerringbro-Silkeborg	GOG Gudme	HC Midtjylland	KIF Kolding Copenhagen	Lemvig-Thyborøn	Mors-Thy Håndbold	Odder Håndbold	Ribe-Esbjerg HH	Skanderborg Håndbold	Skjern Håndbold	SønderjyskE	Team Tvis Holstebro
Aalborg		29–24	23–22	26–20	23-20	30–26	30–20	27–25	36–28	26–18	26–22	24–24	28–24	24–24
Aarhus Håndbold	23–16		25–29	24-24	23–23	29-26	30–29	25-16	33–23	29–29	34–29	21–28	24–25	23–21
Bjerringbro-Silkeborg	27-24	29–27		22–20	25–23	16–25	29–22	29–16	32–25	23–22	31–26	25-21	29-25	32–33
GOG Gudme	22-22	30–27	24–25		28–28	26-25	34–24	27–30	40–25	20–18	32–27	24-27	24–24	18–26
HC Midtjylland	27–26	25-26	31–24	28–28		28–30	27–25	25-24	28–25	26–20	21–28	31–27	26–26	29-30
KIF Kolding Copenhagen	20–20	31–23	24–20	34–28	30–24		38–26	23–19	33-20	26-22	29–17	30–27	30-19	30–26
Lemvig-Thyborøn	21-22	34–30	20–28	31–35	27–32	29–37		29–27	29–29	19-25	33–30	26–34	29-31	28–27
Mors-Thy	22–23	26–28	24-23	26-29	20–17	22–26	27–19		31–16	19–18	33–25	27–23	19–18	22–27
Odder	22–27	23–33	22–29	19–41	27–28	24–28	24-32	23–24		23–32	35–26	29–29	22–27	20–30
Ribe-Esbjerg	24–26	29–25	30–19	23–18	21–21	27–28	24–19	26–24	31-25		25–21	29–29	27–31	25-33
Skanderborg	25-24	26–28	19–25	20–29	26–30	23–29	27–23	25-28	29-20	13–19		27–28	29–22	27-38
Skjern	22–30	34-24	24–24	30–24	29-19	30-31	29–22	38–32	31–29	37–25	30–28		35–26	34–25
SønderjyskE	27–21	31–27	22–26	35–34	20–30	19–28	35–24	22–24	28–25	19-21	30-29	26–22		24–29
Tvis Holstebro	23–24	25–26	37-31	26–27	23–23	19–24	35-25	27–24	34-32	27–20	31–23	33–25	34–28	

No .1-8 from the regular season divided into two groups with the top two will advance to the semifinals

=== Group 1 ===
	Team	Pld	W	D	L	GF	GA	Diff	Pts
1	KIF Kolding København	6	4	0	2	167	150	+17	10
2	Skjern Håndbold	6	4	0	2	160	160	0	8
3	Team Tvis Holstebro	6	2	0	4	169	174	-5	5
4	Aarhus Håndbold	6	2	0	4	161	173	-12	4

	KIF	HOL	SKJ	AAR
KIF Kolding København		33–24	31–20	23–22
Team Tvis Holstebro	32-23		24–30	39-32
Skjern Håndbold	27–26	29-24		23–29
Aarhus Håndbold	25-31	27-26	26-31	

=== Group 2 ===
	Team	Pld	W	D	L	GF	GA	Diff	Pts
1	Bjerringbro-Silkeborg	6	6	0	0	157	132	+25	13
2	Aalborg Håndbold	6	4	0	2	168	155	+13	10
3	GOG Gudme	6	1	1	4	155	169	-14	3
4	HC Midtjylland	6	0	1	5	149	173	-24	1

	AAL	BSV	HCM	GOG
Aalborg Håndbold		25–28	31-27	33–27
Bjerringbro-Silkeborg	22-19		32-22	26-24
HC Midtjylland	26–29	19-25		28–29
GOG	25-31	23-24	27-27	

== Semifinal ==
Date		Home team in 1. match	Home team in 2. match	Result		
1. match	2. match	Home team in 1. match	Home team in 2. match	Agg.	1. match	2. match
9/5	23/5	Aalborg Håndbold	KIF Kolding København	49-52	21-27	28-25
10/5	24/5	Skjern Håndbold	Bjerringbro-Silkeborg	52-46	31-25	21-21

== 3rd place ==
Highest ranking team in the regular season plays at home in the second match.

Dato		Home team in 1. match	Home team in 2. match	Result		
1. match	2. match	Home team in 1. match	Home team in 2. match	Agg.	1. match	2. match
28/5	31/5	Bjerringbro-Silkeborg	Aalborg Håndbold	52-43	24-18	28-25

== Final ==
Highest ranking team in the regular season plays at home in the second match.

Dato		Home team in 1. match	Home team in 2. match	Result		
1. match	2. match	Home team in 1. match	Home team in 2. match	Agg.	1. match	2. match
28/5	31/5	Skjern Håndbold	KIF Kolding København	45-50	24-30	21-20

== Relegation playoff ==
No. 12-13 from Håndboldligaen and no. 2-3 from the first division is meet each other for the last 2 seats. The winner stays in the league. the loser relegated to Division 1

=== Group 1 ===
Date		Home team in 1st match	Home team in 2nd match	Result		
1st match	2nd match	Home team in 1st match	Home team in 2nd match	Agg.	1st match	2nd match
29/3	5/4	Skive fH	Lemvig-Thyborøn Håndbold	53-46	30-23	23-23

=== Group 2 ===
Date		Home team in 1st match	Home team in 2nd match	Result		
1st match	2nd match	Home team in 1st match	Home team in 2nd match	Agg.	1st match	2nd match
30/3	6/4	Randers HH	Skanderborg Håndbold	55-57	26-28	29-29

== Number of teams by regions ==
	Region	No. teams	Teams
1	Midtjylland	8	Aarhus Håndbold, Bjerringbro-Silkeborg, HC Midtjylland, Lemvig-Thyborøn, Odder, Skanderborg, Skjern and Tvis Holstebro
2	Syddanmark	4	GOG, KIF Kolding Copenhagen, Ribe-Esbjerg and SønderjyskE
3	Nordjylland	2	Aalborg Håndbold and Mors-Thy

== Top goalscorers ==
Statistics.

As of 1 June 2015

Rank	Player	Team	Goals
1	(Denmark) Nikolaj Ø. Nielsen	Bjerringbro-Silkeborg	205
2	(Denmark) Søren Nørgård	Lemvig-Thyborøn Håndbold	178
3	(Denmark) Michael Damgaard	Team Tvis Holstebro	177
4	(Denmark) Kristian Klitgaard	Odder Håndbold	163
5	(Denmark) Mads Christiansen	Bjerringbro-Silkeborg	157
6	(Denmark) Bo Spellerberg	KIF Kolding København	156
7	(Denmark) Henrik Møllgaard	Skjern Håndbold	151
8	(Norway) Håvard Tvedten	Aalborg Håndbold	149
9	(Greenland) Minik Dahl Høegh	GOG	138
9	(Slovenia) Sebastian Skube	Bjerringbro-Silkeborg	138
9	(Denmark) Lasse Mikkelsen	Skjern Håndbold	138

== All Star Team ==
- Goalkeeper: (Denmark) Sebastian Frandsen (REHH)
- Left Wing: (Denmark) Søren Nørgård (LTH)
- Left Back: (Denmark) Michael Damgaard (THH)
- Centre Back: (Slovenia) Sebastian Skube (BSV)
- Pivot: (France) Cyril Viudes (KIF)
- Right Back: (Denmark) Nikolaj Ø. Nielsen (BSV)
- Right Wing: (Denmark) Patrick Wiesmach Larsen (THH)

=== Coach of the season ===
(Finland) Patrick Westerholm - TTH Holstebro
