= 2015–16 Håndboldligaen =

Håndboldligaen
- Season: 2015–16
- Champions: Bjerringbro-Silkeborg (1st title)
- Relegated: Skive fH; Nordsjælland Håndbold
- Champions League: Bjerringbro-Silkeborg; Team Tvis Holstebro
- EHF Cup: GOG; KIF Kolding København; HC Midtjylland
- Matches: 218
- Goals: 11,064 (50.75 per match)
- Top goalscorer: (Denmark) Patrick Wiesmach Larsen (217 goals)
- Biggest home win: HCM 36-19 Skive
- Biggest away win: Skive 16-31 KIF
- Highest scoring: BSH 38-30 Aarhus

The 2015–16 Håndboldligaen (known as the Boxer Herreligaen for sponsorship reasons) is the 80th season of the Håndboldligaen, Denmark's premier Handball league.

Bjerringbro-Silkeborg won their first title ever, when they beat Team Tvis Holstebro in the final. Skive fH was relegated, as they finished last in the regular season.

== Team information ==
Locations of the 2015–16 Håndboldligaen

The following 14 clubs compete in the Håndboldligaen during the 2015–16 season:

Team	Location	Arena	Capacity
Aalborg Håndbold	Aalborg	Jutlander Bank Arena	5,000
Aarhus Håndbold	Aarhus	Ceres Arena	5,001
Bjerringbro-Silkeborg	Bjerringbro	Silkeborg-Hallerne	3,900
GOG	Gudme	Gudme-Hallerne	2,645
HC Midtjylland	Herning	Sportscenter Herning	1,600
KIF Kolding Copenhagen	Kolding	Tre-For Arena; Brøndby Hall	2,650; 4,500
Mors-Thy	Nykøbing Mors	Jyske Bank Mors Arena	1,500
Nordsjælland Håndbold	Helsinge; Hillerød	Helsinge-Hallen; FrederiksborgCentret	1,600; 1,100
Skive fH	Skive	Skivehallerne	2,100
Ribe-Esbjerg	Ribe	Ribe Fritidscenter	2,200
Skanderborg	Skanderborg	Morten Børup Hallen	550
Skjern	Skjern	Skjern Bank Arena	3,100
SønderjyskE	Sønderborg	Broager Sparekasse Skansen	2,200
Tvis Holstebro	Holstebro	Idrætscenter Vest	3,250

=== Personnel and kits ===
Following is the list of clubs competing in 2015–16 Håndboldligaen, with their manager, kit manufacturer and shirt sponsor.

Team	President	Head coach	Kit manufacturer	Shirt sponsor
Aalborg Håndbold	Jan Larsen	(Denmark) Jesper Jensen	hummel	Jutlander Bank
Aarhus Håndbold	Henrik Lundorff	(Denmark) Erik Veje Rasmussen	hummel	Sparkassen Kronjylland, Jytas
Bjerringbro-Silkeborg	Frank Lajer	(Denmark) Peter Bredsdorff-Larsen	adidas	Jyske Bank, Grundfos
GOG	Kasper Jørgensen	(Greenland) Jakob Larsen	hummel	Daloon, EnergiFyn, Fynske Bank
HC Midtjylland	Allan Witt	(Denmark) Morten Secher	hummel	eptools, KP Industri
KIF Kolding Copenhagen	Jens Boesen	(Bosnia and Herzegovina) Bilal Šuman	kempa	TREFOR
Mors-Thy Håndbold	Johannes Søndergaard	(Denmark) Jan Paulsen	hummel	Jyske Bank
Nordsjælland Håndbold	Jørgen Simonsen	(Denmark) Ian Marko Fog	hummel	GF Forsikring
Skive fH	Mogens Garder	(Denmark) Simon Sørensen	kappa	Spar Bank
Ribe-Esbjerg	Rikke Tangaa	(Denmark) Claus Uhrenholt	hummel	fros
Skanderborg	Jens Christensen	(Denmark) Nicolej Krickau	Puma	AVR, Skanderborg kommune
Skjern Håndbold	Henning Kjærgaard	(Denmark) Ole Nørgaard	Puma	Skjern Bank
SønderjyskE	Klaus B. Rasmussen	(Denmark) Morten Henriksen	Diadora	SeaDane Travel
Team Tvis Holstebro	Jørgen S. Hansen	(Finland) Patrick Westerholm	hummel	Vestjysk Bank

== Regular season ==
=== Standings ===
Pos	Team	Pld	W	D	L	GF	GA	GD	Pts	Qualification or relegation
1	Team Tvis Holstebro	26	19	1	6	719	659	+60	39	Championship Play-Off + Advance to Champions League
2	KIF Kolding København	26	14	7	5	665	591	+74	35	Championship Play-Off
3	Århus Håndbold	26	16	3	7	697	653	+44	35	Championship Play-Off
4	Skjern Håndbold	26	15	3	8	726	686	+40	33	Championship Play-Off
5	Bjerringbro-Silkeborg	26	15	3	8	672	607	+65	33	Championship Play-Off
6	GOG Håndbold	26	14	2	10	704	648	+56	30	Championship Play-Off
7	Aalborg Håndbold	26	12	4	10	676	663	+13	28	Championship Play-Off
8	SønderjyskE Herrer	26	10	5	11	637	652	−15	25	Championship Play-Off
9	Skanderborg Håndbold	26	10	3	13	619	640	−21	23	
10	Mors-Thy Håndbold	26	7	5	14	632	673	−41	19	
11	Ribe-Esbjerg HH	26	9	1	16	585	643	−58	19	
12	HC Midtjylland	26	9	1	16	674	690	−16	19	Relegation Play-Off
13	Nordsjælland Håndbold (R)	26	7	2	17	620	678	−58	16	Relegation Play-Off
14	Skive fH (R)	26	5	0	21	573	716	−143	10	Relegated

Updated to match(es) played on 18 March 2016. Source:
Rules for classification: 1) points; 2) Goal difference; 3) Goals scored.
(R) Relegated

! There's a new relegation playoff made in November 2014

=== Schedule and results ===
Home \ Away	AAL	AAR	BSV	GOG	HCM	KIF	MOR	NOR	REH	SKA	SKI	SKJ	SØN	TTH
Aalborg Håndbold		24–27	27–24	31–28	25–26	24–29	33–25	27–25	27–19	30–26	25–27	28–24	23–21	23–30
Århus Håndbold	26–27		23–29	31–27	29–27	25–25	27–15	26–20	25–19	27–22	24–30	35–29	26–27	27–22
Bjerringbro-Silkeborg	24–19	38–30		24–21	30–21	24–18	25–22	23–16	28–17	28–28	33–22	26–29	26–20	25–28
GOG Håndbold	25–28	31–22	27–22		31–29	24–26	24–23	30–26	28–21	24–26	22–16	24–27	26–26	30–20
HC Midtjylland	26–26	27–29	23–25	27–34		25–24	28–21	32–20	25–24	24–21	36–19	21–30	24–25	26–28
KIF Kolding København	25–25	20–20	25–25	27–29	30–20		24–24	25–20	26–22	29–21	20–16	28–26	30–20	30–26
Mors-Thy Håndbold	29–25	23–25	26–29	24–23	33–31	25–25		24–25	28–19	25–25	27–23	25–30	25–28	24–28
Nordsjælland Håndbold	20–20	26–30	30–26	31–27	26–27	20–29	22–22		21–19	24–28	24–23	28–29	22–25	22–25
Ribe-Esbjerg HH	25–24	19–25	24–19	19–33	28–21	22–20	26–23	20–27		21–21	31–19	21–26	22–27	23–29
Skanderborg Håndbold	25–22	21–22	23–21	26–28	27–19	20–29	26–21	26–23	25–28		27–26	24–23	21–20	21–22
Skive fH	28–32	19–25	21–26	17–30	16–27	16–31	23–26	25–23	22–24	20–19		23–36	29–27	22–32
Skjern Håndbold	27–26	29–29	24–24	26–29	32–29	29–24	33–25	23–30	27–23	30–22	30–27		31–31	23–31
SønderjyskE Herrer	25–25	27–25	17–23	23–23	22–21	19–22	22–22	29–27	22–29	25–21	29–25	27–28		27–28
Team Tvis Holstebro	27–30	30–35	26–25	30–26	35–32	24–24	24–25	36–22	25–20	29–27	30–19	26–25	28–26	

Legend: Blue = home team win; Yellow = draw; Red = away team win.

No. 1-8 from the regular season divided into two groups with the top two will advance to the semifinals

=== Top Goalscorers - Regular Season ===
As of matches played on 23 March 2016

Rank	Player	Club	Goals
1	(Denmark) Patrick Wiesmach Larsen	Team Tvis Holstebro	167
2	(Denmark) Bo Spellerberg	KIF Kolding København	152
3	(Denmark) Cornelius Kragh Aastrup	Nordsjælland Håndbold	150
4	(Denmark) Tim Sørensen	Skanderborg Håndbold	146
5	(Denmark) Kasper Søndergaard	Skjern Håndbold	137
6	(Denmark) Tobias Ellebæk	Mors-Thy Håndbold	134
7	(Denmark) Andreas Holst Jensen	GOG	127
8	(Denmark) Peter Balling	Team Tvis Holstebro	125
9	(Denmark) Kasper Gudnitz	HC Midtjylland	117
10	(Norway) Sander Sagosen	Aalborg Håndbold	116

== Winner's playoff ==
=== Group 1 ===
Pos	Team	Pld	W	D	L	GF	GA	GD	Pts	Qualification
1	Bjerringbro-Silkeborg	6	4	0	2	161	155	+6	8	Advance to semifinals
2	Team Tvis Holstebro	6	3	0	3	151	151	0	8	Advance to semifinals
3	Skjern Håndbold	6	3	0	3	159	156	+3	7	
4	SønderjyskE Herrer	6	2	0	4	148	157	−9	4	

Updated to match(es) played on 10 May 2016. Source:
Rules for classification: 1) points; 2) Goal difference; 3) Goals scored.

Home \ Away	TTH	BSV	SKJ	SØN
Team Tvis Holstebro		30–28	24–27	25–21
Bjerringbro-Silkeborg	26–24		25–24	27–22
Skjern Håndbold	27–25	31–23		24–30
SønderjyskE Herrer	22–23	24–32	29–26	

Legend: Blue = home team win; Yellow = draw; Red = away team win.

=== Group 2 ===
Pos	Team	Pld	W	D	L	GF	GA	GD	Pts	Qualification
1	KIF Kolding København	6	3	2	1	154	147	+7	10	Advance to semifinals
2	GOG Håndbold	6	3	3	0	164	155	+9	9	Advance to semifinals
3	Aalborg Håndbold	6	2	1	3	161	157	+4	5	
4	Århus Håndbold	6	0	2	4	148	168	−20	3	

Updated to match(es) played on 12 May 2016. Source:
Rules for classification: 1) points; 2) Goal difference; 3) Goals scored.

Home \ Away	AAR	KIF	GOG	AAL
Århus Håndbold		23–27	26–26	29–29
KIF Kolding København	26–21		26–26	27–25
GOG Håndbold	31–25	26–26		29–2
Aalborg Håndbold	29–24	26–22	25–26	

Legend: Blue = home team win; Yellow = draw; Red = away team win.

== Playoff ==
=== Semifinal ===
Date		Home team in 1. match	Home team in 2. match	Result		
1. match	2. match	Home team in 1. match	Home team in 2. match	Agg.	1. match	2. match
18/5	21/5	GOG	Team Tvis Holstebro	52-58	27-28	25-30
18/5	22/5	Bjerringbro-Silkeborg	KIF Kolding København	55-51	24-23	31-28

=== 3rd place ===
Date		Home team in 1. match	Home team in 2. match	Result		
1. match	2. match	Home team in 1. match	Home team in 2. match	Agg.	1. match	2. match
25/5	28/5	GOG	KIF Kolding København	58-56	32-27	29-26

=== Final ===
Date		Home team in 1. match	Home team in 2. match	Result		
1. match	2. match	Home team in 1. match	Home team in 2. match	Agg.	1. match	2. match
25/5	28/5	Bjerringbro-Silkeborg	Team Tvis Holstebro	52-46	27-20	26-25

== Relegation playoff ==
No. 12-13 from Håndboldligaen and no. 2-3 from the first division is meet each other for the last 2 seats. The winner stays in the league. the loser relegated to Division 1,

=== Group 1 ===
Date		Home team in 1. match	Home team in 2. match	Result		
1. match	2. match	Home team in 1. match	Home team in 2. match	Agg.	1. match	2. match
15/4	21/4	Odder	HC Midtjylland	49-51	29-25	26-20

=== Group 2 ===
Date		Home team in 1. match	Home team in 2. match	Result		
1. match	2. match	Home team in 1. match	Home team in 2. match	Agg.	1. match	2. match
12/4	18/4	TM Tønder	Nordsjælland Håndbold	46-45	29-25	20-17

== Number of teams by regions ==
	Region	No. teams	Teams
1	Midtjylland	7	Aarhus Håndbold, Bjerringbro-Silkeborg, HC Midtjylland, Skanderborg Håndbold, Skive fH, Skjern Håndbold, Team Tvis Holstebro
2	Syddanmark	4	KIF Kolding København, GOG, Ribe-Esbjerg HH, SønderjyskE
3	Nordjylland	2	Aalborg Håndbold, Mors-Thy Håndbold
4	Hovedstaden	1	Nordsjælland Håndbold

== All Star Team ==
- Goalkeeper: (Denmark) Kasper Hvidt (KIF)
- Left Wing: (Denmark) Magnus Landin Jacobsen (KIF)
- Left Back: (Denmark) Bo Spellerberg (KIF)
- Centre Back: (Norway) Sander Sagosen (AAL)
- Pivot: (Norway) Bjarte Myrhol (SKJ)
- Right Back: (Denmark) Kasper Søndergaard (SKJ)
- Right Wing: (Denmark) Patrick Wiesmach Larsen (TTH)

=== Coach of the season ===
(Finland) Patrick Westerholm - TTH Holstebro

== Top goalscorers ==
As of matches played on 6 June 2016

Rank	Player	Club	Goals
1	(Denmark) Patrick Wiesmach Larsen	Team Tvis Holstebro	217
2	(Denmark) Bo Spellerberg	KIF Kolding København	198
3	(Denmark) Andreas Holst Jensen	GOG	175
4	(Denmark) Kasper Søndergaard	Skjern Håndbold	169
5	(Norway) Sander Sagosen	Aalborg Håndbold	153
6	(Denmark) Cornelius Kragh Aastrup	Nordsjælland Håndbold	150
7	(Greenland) Minik Dahl Høegh	GOG	127
8	(Denmark) Tim Sørensen	Skanderborg Håndbold	146
8	(Denmark) Martin Larsen	Aalborg Håndbold	146
10	(Denmark) Nikolaj Markussen	Bjerringbro-Silkeborg	141
