= 2017–18 Håndboldligaen =

Håndboldligaen
- Season: 2017-18
- Champions: Skjern Håndbold
- Relegated: TM Tønder; HC Midtjylland
- Champions League: Skjern Håndbold, Bjerringbro-Silkeborg
- EHF Cup: GOG, Aalborg Håndbold, TTH Holstebro
- Matches: 222
- Goals: 12,195 (54.93 per match)
- Top goalscorer: (Denmark) Nikolaj Ø. Nielsen (202 goals)
- Biggest home win: 28 goals: GOG 41–13 HCM
- Biggest away win: 19 goals: HCM 17–36 AAL
- Highest scoring: 75 goals: KIF 39–36 NSH
- All statistics correct as of 25 April 2018.

The 2017–18 Håndboldligaen, known as the 888ligaen for sponsorship reasons, was the 82nd season of the Håndboldligaen, Denmark's premier handball league. Nordsjælland Håndbold was the promoted team from the previous year's 1st Division.

Skjern Håndbold was declared Danish champion after they beat Bjerringbro-Silkeborg in the final.

HC Midtjylland was declared bankrupt during the season, and it was thus administratively relegated to the 2nd Division, the third tier of Danish handball.

== Team information ==
Locations of the 2017–18 Håndboldligaen

14 clubs competed in the Håndboldligaen during the 2017–18 season:

Team	Location	Arena	Capacity
Aalborg Håndbold	Aalborg	Jutlander Bank Arena	5,009
Aarhus Håndbold	Aarhus	Ceres Arena	5,001
Bjerringbro-Silkeborg	Bjerringbro	Jysk Arena	2,845
GOG	Gudme	SU`VI:T Arena	2,265
HC Midtjylland	Herning	Messecenter Herning	3,350
KIF Kolding Copenhagen	Kolding Copenhagen	Tre-For Arena; Brøndby Hall	5,182; 5,063
Mors-Thy	Nykøbing Mors Thisted	Jyske Bank Mors Arena Thy Hallen	2,296 1,284
Nordsjælland Håndbold	Helsinge; Hillerød	Helsinge-Hallen; FrederiksborgCentret	1,600; 1,100
Ribe-Esbjerg	Esbjerg Ribe	Blue Water Dokken Invactor Arena	3,386 1,976
Skanderborg	Skanderborg	Fælledhallen	2,000
Skjern	Skjern	Skjern Bank Arena	3,264
SønderjyskE	Sønderborg	Skansen	2,200
TTH Holstebro	Holstebro	Idrætscenter Vest	3,250
TM Tønder	Tønder	Tønder Sport- og FritidsCenter	1,500

=== Personnel and kits ===
Following is the list of clubs competing in 2017–18 Håndboldligaen, with their manager, kit manufacturer and shirt sponsor.

Team	President	Head coach	Kit manufacturer	Shirt sponsor
Aalborg Håndbold	Jan Larsen	(Iceland) Aron Kristjánsson	hummel	Jutlander Bank
Aarhus Håndbold	Henrik Lundorff	(Denmark) Erik Veje Rasmussen	hummel	Sparkassen Kronjylland, Jytas
Bjerringbro-Silkeborg	Frank Lajer	(Denmark) Peter Bredsdorff-Larsen	adidas	Jyske Bank, Grundfos
GOG	Kasper Jørgensen	(Denmark) Nicolej Krickau	Select	Fynske Bank, EnergiFyn
HC Midtjylland	Allan Witt	(Norway) Jonas Wille	hummel	eptools, KP Industri
KIF Kolding Copenhagen	Jens Boesen	(Denmark) Lars Frederiksen	H2O Sportswear	Jolly Cola, EWII
Mors-Thy Håndbold	Johannes Søndergaard	(Denmark) Søren Hansen	hummel	Jyske Bank
Nordsjælland Håndbold	Jørgen Simonsen	(Denmark) Ian Marko Fog	hummel	GF Forsikring
Ribe-Esbjerg	Rikke Tangaa	(Denmark) Jan Leslie	hummel	fros
Skanderborg	Jens Christensen	(Denmark) Nick Rasmussen	Puma	AVR, Skanderborg kommune
Skjern Håndbold	Henning Kjærgaard	(Denmark) Ole Nørgaard	Puma	Skjern Bank
SønderjyskE	Klaus B. Rasmussen	(Denmark) Kasper Christensen	Diadora	SeaDane Travel
TTH Holstebro	Jørgen S. Hansen	(Finland) Patrick Westerholm	hummel	Vestjysk Bank
TM Tønder	Uwe Nielsen	(Denmark) Torben Sørensen	hummel	Sparekassen Bredebro

=== Managerial changes ===
Team	Outgoing manager	Manner of departure	Date of vacancy	Replaced by	Date of appointment	Position in table
Ribe-Esbjerg HH	(Denmark) Jan Leslie	Mutual Consent	29 November 2017	(Denmark) Sune Agerschou	29 November 2017	11th

== Regular season ==
=== Standings ===
Pos	Team	Pld	W	D	L	GF	GA	GD	Pts	Qualification or relegation
1	Skjern Håndbold	26	20	3	3	739	674	+65	43	Championship Play-Off + Advance to Champions League
2	GOG Håndbold	26	20	2	4	759	632	+127	42	Championship Play-Off
3	Bjerringbro-Silkeborg	26	20	0	6	789	668	+121	40	Championship Play-Off
4	Aalborg Håndbold	26	16	0	10	711	656	+55	32	Championship Play-Off
5	TTH Holstebro	26	14	3	9	694	660	+34	31	Championship Play-Off
6	KIF Kolding København	26	11	3	12	713	719	−6	25	Championship Play-Off
7	Nordsjælland Håndbold	26	10	4	12	726	745	−19	24	Championship Play-Off
8	Århus Håndbold	26	11	1	14	732	737	−5	23	Championship Play-Off
9	Mors-Thy Håndbold	26	11	1	14	691	715	−24	23	
10	Ribe-Esbjerg HH	26	9	4	13	719	708	+11	22	
11	SønderjyskE Herrer	26	8	1	17	693	741	−48	17	
12	Skanderborg Håndbold	26	8	1	17	642	691	−49	17	Relegation Play-Off
13	HC Midtjylland	26	6	1	19	606	778	−172	13	Relegation Play-Off
14	TM Tønder Håndbold (R)	26	5	2	19	654	744	−90	12	Relegated

Updated to match(es) played on 28 March 2018. Source:
Rules for classification: 1) points; 2) Goal difference; 3) Goals scored.
(R) Relegated

! There's a new relegation playoff made in November 2014

=== Schedule and results ===
Home \ Away	AAL	AAR	BSV	GOG	HCM	KIF	MTH	NSH	REH	SKA	SKJ	SØN	TTH	TØN
Aalborg Håndbold		29–24	24–23	27–25	28–26	30–20	25–21	33–29	29–25	23–26	25–27	28–24	25–26	31–28
Århus Håndbold	20–24		32–34	24–31	33–15	33–26	27–28	28–28	30–26	24–30	26–29	33–29	27–29	29–22
Bjerringbro-Silkeborg	36–28	38–28		24–25	38–19	31–28	40–31	30–31	30–27	28–22	26–19	28–20	27–25	31–15
GOG Håndbold	30–26	33–23	21–19		41–13	24–22	31–22	24–21	31–23	28–27	26–31	32–22	28–23	34–22
HC Midtjylland	17–36	26–30	32–30	30–35		23–24	25–23	20–34	27–26	26–21	21–27	25–41	17–27	27–25
KIF Kolding København	23–22	25–28	28–34	32–31	37–24		35–31	33–28	31–27	29–23	24–28	29–30	26–26	27–27
Mors-Thy Håndbold	18–24	28–33	26–30	23–29	27–28	31–28		29–22	29–23	24–23	24–24	38–33	20–19	29–23
Nordsjælland Håndbold	30–28	32–25	24–36	25–34	30–30	31–29	32–31		27–27	32–28	29–32	26–26	27–22	31–26
Ribe-Esbjerg HH	23–25	24–26	27–30	33–23	29–16	23–24	29–25	34–32		33–22	29–29	30–28	21–21	25–25
Skanderborg Håndbold	24–23	25–29	24–20	23–30	20–19	29–29	22–29	26–25	31–34		19–26	27–19	22–32	29–19
Skjern Håndbold	31–29	32–27	30–31	29–29	25–24	25–24	30–26	31–27	33–29	31–30		27–22	34–23	26–22
SønderjyskE Herrer	28–35	27–31	21–30	26–30	26–24	23–28	30–33	30–26	26–28	28–20	24–21		29–26	23–28
TTH Holstebro	26–24	32–31	26–28	18–18	29–26	32–35	32–22	31–22	33–29	23–22	30–31	27–31		27–24
TM Tønder Håndbold	26–30	35–31	31–32	24–36	36–26	25–27	18–23	22–25	25–35	28–27	28–31	26–23	24–29	

Legend: Blue = home team win; Yellow = draw; Red = away team win.

No. 1-8 from the regular season divided into two groups with the top two will advance to the semifinals

== Top goalscorers ==
As of matches played on 4 June 2018

=== Regular season ===
Rank	Player	Club	Goals
1	(Denmark) Johan Meklenborg	Nordsjælland Håndbold	167
2	(Denmark) Nicolai Pedersen	Nordsjælland Håndbold	150
3	(Denmark) Bo Spellerberg	KIF Kolding København	149
4	(Denmark) Jacob Holm	Ribe-Esbjerg HH	146
5	(Norway) Erik Thorsteinsen Toft	Mors-Thy Håndbold	145
6	(Sweden) Marcus Dahlin	Mors-Thy Håndbold	143
7	(Denmark) Nikolaj Ø. Nielsen	Bjerringbro-Silkeborg	142
8	(Denmark) Morten Balling Christensen	Skanderborg Håndbold	139
9	(Denmark) Anders Eggert	Skjern Håndbold	134
10	(Sweden) Philip Stenmalm	KIF Kolding København	130

=== Overall season ===
Rank	Player	Club	Goals
1	(Denmark) Nikolaj Ø. Nielsen	Bjerringbro-Silkeborg	202
2	(Denmark) Bo Spellerberg	KIF Kolding København	195
3	(Denmark) Johan Meklenborg	Nordsjælland Håndbold	194
4	(Denmark) Anders Eggert	Skjern Håndbold	189
5	(Denmark) Nicolai Pedersen	Nordsjælland Håndbold	180
6	(Denmark) Jacob Holm	Ribe-Esbjerg HH	168
7	(Denmark) Lasse Kjær Møller	GOG Håndbold	167
8	(Sweden) Markus Olsson	Skjern Håndbold	162
9	(Denmark) Jacob Lassen	Bjerringbro-Silkeborg	159
10	(Norway) Erik Thorsteinsen Toft	Mors-Thy Håndbold	158

== Winner's playoff ==
=== Group 1 ===
Pos	Team	Pld	W	D	L	GF	GA	GD	Pts	Qualification
1	Aalborg Håndbold	6	5	0	1	186	166	+20	11	Advance to semifinals
2	Skjern Håndbold	6	3	0	3	173	174	−1	8	Advance to semifinals
3	TTH Holstebro	6	3	1	2	172	168	+4	7	
4	Aarhus Håndbold	6	0	1	5	155	178	−23	1	

Rules for classification: 1) points; 2) Goal difference; 3) Goals scored.

Home \ Away	AAL	AAR	SKJ	TTH
Aalborg Håndbold		28–27	33–30	35–23
Aarhus Håndbold	29–35		26–33	21–29
Skjern Håndbold	26–25	26–28		35–30
TTH Holstebro	31–27	27–27	32–22	

Legend: Blue = home team win; Yellow = draw; Red = away team win.

=== Group 2 ===
Pos	Team	Pld	W	D	L	GF	GA	GD	Pts	Qualification
1	GOG Håndbold	6	3	2	1	191	181	+10	10	Advance to semifinals
2	Bjerringbro-Silkeborg	6	3	2	1	181	170	+11	9	Advance to semifinals
3	KIF Kolding København	6	3	1	2	182	185	−3	7	
4	Nordsjælland Håndbold	6	0	1	5	174	192	−18	1	

Rules for classification: 1) points; 2) Goal difference; 3) Goals scored.

Home \ Away	BSV	GOG	KIF	NSH
Bjerringbro-Silkeborg		28–29	31–28	30–30
GOG Håndbold	32–32		29–29	38–31
KIF Kolding København	27–32	33–32		39–36
Nordsjælland Håndbold	24–28	28–31	25–26	

Legend: Blue = home team win; Yellow = draw; Red = away team win.

== Playoff ==
=== Semifinal ===
Date			Home team in the 1st match & 3rd match	Home team in the 2nd match	Results		
1st match	2nd match	3rd match	Home team in the 1st match & 3rd match	Home team in the 2nd match	1st match	2nd match	3rd match
10-05-18	13-05-18	16-05-18	Skjern Håndbold	GOG Håndbold	28–31	24–23	38–30
10-05-18	13-05-18	16-05-18	Bjerringbro-Silkeborg	Aalborg Håndbold	28–20	32–28	–

! Best of three matches. In the case of a tie after the second match, a third match is played. Highest ranking team in the regular season has the home advantage in the first and possible third match.

=== 3rd place ===
Date			Home team in the 1st match & 3rd match	Home team in the 2nd match	Results		
1st match	2nd match	3rd match	Home team in the 1st match & 3rd match	Home team in the 2nd match	1st match	2nd match	3rd match
21-05-18	28-05-18	31-05-18	GOG Håndbold	Aalborg Håndbold	25–26	37–31	25–22

! Best of three matches. In the case of a tie after the second match, a third match is played. Highest ranking team in the regular season has the home advantage in the first and possible third match.

=== Final ===
Date			Home team in the 1st match & 3rd match	Home team in the 2nd match	Results		
1st match	2nd match	3rd match	Home team in the 1st match & 3rd match	Home team in the 2nd match	1st match	2nd match	3rd match
20-05-18	29-05-18		Skjern Håndbold	Bjerringbro-Silkeborg	29–29	27–26	–

! Best of three matches. In the case of a tie after the second match, a third match is played. Highest ranking team in the regular season has the home advantage in the first and possible third match.

== Relegation playoff ==
No. 5 from the relegation playoff and winner, of the playoff match between 2nd and 3rd, from the first division is meet each other for the last seat. The winner stays in the league. the loser relegated to Division 1.

Pos	Team	Pld	W	D	L	GF	GA	GD	Pts	Qualification or relegation
1	SønderjyskE	3	3	0	0	95	81	+14	7	
2	Mors-Thy Håndbold	3	2	0	1	92	95	−3	6	
3	Ribe-Esbjerg HH	3	0	1	2	84	91	−7	3	
4	Skanderborg Håndbold	3	0	1	2	83	87	−4	2	
5	HC Midtjylland (Note: HC Midtjylland was excluded from the relegation playoff on 23 April 2017 due to license violation. The results were abandoned.)	0	0	0	0	0	0	0	0	Relegated

Rules for classification: 1) points; 2) Goal difference; 3) Goals scored.
Notes:

Home \ Away	~~HCM~~	MTH	REH	SKA	SØN
~~HC Midtjylland~~		DQ	DQ	DQ	DQ
Mors-Thy Håndbold	DQ		32–31	27–26	
Ribe-Esbjerg HH	DQ				22–28
Skanderborg Håndbold	DQ		31–31		
SønderjyskE Håndbold	DQ	38–33		29–26	

Legend: Blue = home team win; Yellow = draw; Red = away team win.

== Number of teams by regions ==
	Region	No. teams	Teams
1	Midtjylland	6	Aarhus Håndbold, Bjerringbro-Silkeborg, HC Midtjylland, Skanderborg Håndbold, Skjern Håndbold, TTH Holstebro
2	Syddanmark	5	KIF Kolding København, GOG, Ribe-Esbjerg HH, SønderjyskE, TM Tønder
3	Nordjylland	2	Aalborg Håndbold, Mors-Thy Håndbold
4	Hovedstaden	1	Nordsjælland Håndbold

== Coach of the season ==
(Denmark) Ian Marko Fog - Nordsjælland Håndbold
