= Nikolaj Øris Nielsen =

Danish handball player (born 1986)

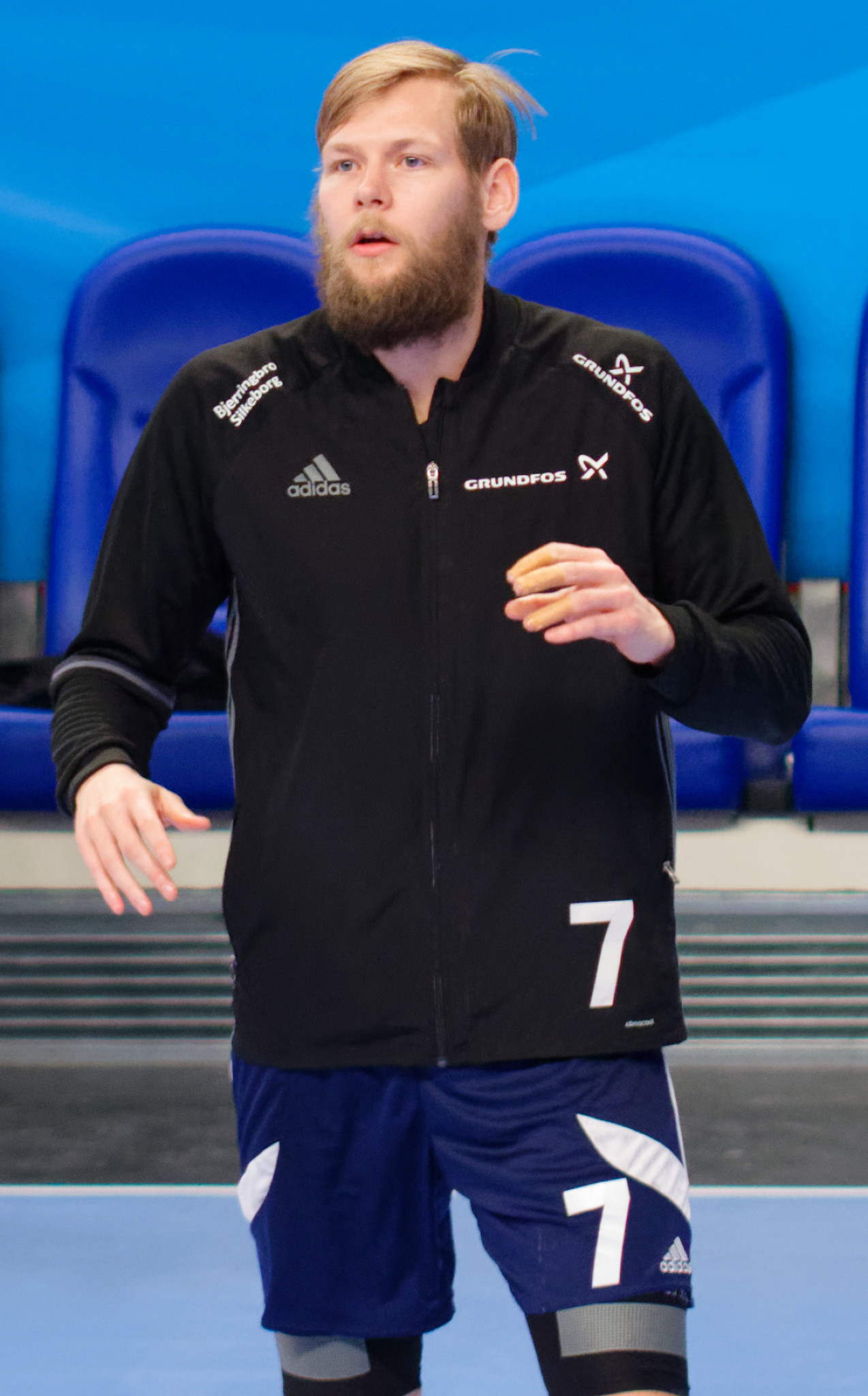

Personal information
- Nationality: Danish
- Born: 26 March 1986 (age 40) Bjerringbro, Denmark
- Height: 1.94 m (6 ft 4 in)

Sport
- Sport: Handball
- Position: Right back
- Current club: Bjerringbro-Silkeborg
- Number: 7

Youth career
- Years: Team
- 1991–2004: Bjerringbro FH

Senior clubs
- Years: Team
- 2004–: Bjerringbro-Silkeborg
- 2008–2009: → Lemvig Håndbold (loan)
National team
Years	Team	Apps	(Gls)
2010–	Denmark	57	(94)
Medal record
World Championship
Gold medal – first place	2019 Germany/Denmark
Gold medal – first place	2021 Egypt

Nikolaj Øris Nielsen (born 26 March 1986) is a Danish handballer for Bjerringbro-Silkeborg and the Danish national team.

He has played his entire career for BSH except a single loan year, where he played for league rivals club Lemvig-Thyborøn Håndbold. In the 2015-16 he was part of the team that won the Danish Championship for the first time in club history.

Nikolaj Øris is the younger brother of follow handball players Mads Ø. Nielsen and Mikkel Ø. Nielsen. He made his debut for the Danish national team in 2010. He has played for Bjerringbro-Silkeborg all his professional career, with the exception of a year on loan at Lemvig-Thyborøn Håndbold.

In 2019 he won the 2019 World Men's Handball Championship with the Danish team. This was the first time ever, that Denmark won the title. In 2021 he won it for a second time at the 2021 World Championship.

== Individual awards ==
- Herreligaen top goalscorer: 2015, 2018

== Honours ==
- Danish Championship:
  - Gold: 2016
