= Henrik Toft Hansen =

Danish handball player (born 1986)

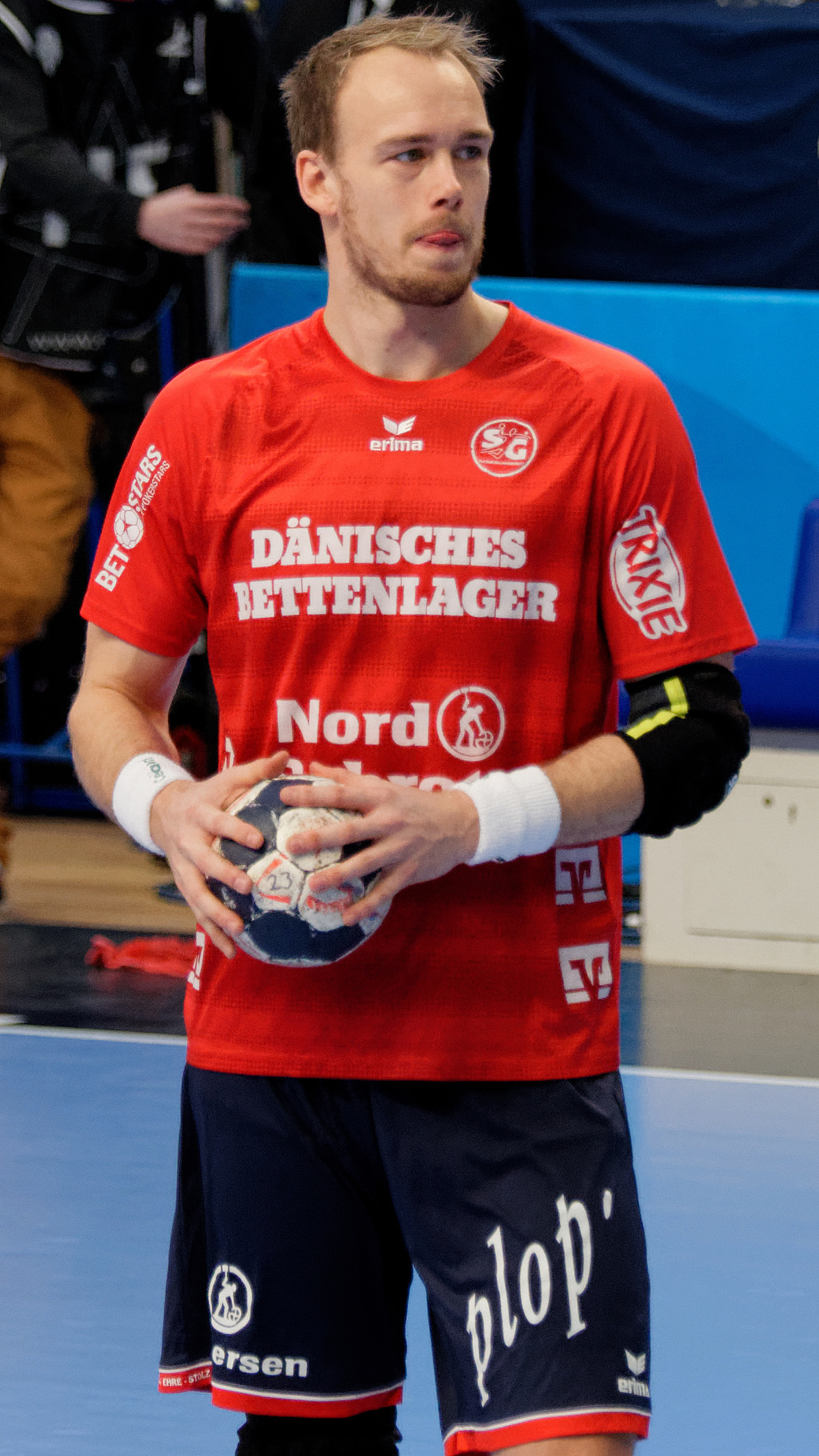
- Hansen in 2018

Personal information
- Nationality: Danish
- Born: 18 December 1986 (age 39) Skive, Denmark
- Height: 2.00 m (6 ft 7 in)

Sport
- Sport: Handball
- Position: Pivot

Youth career
- Years: Team
- 1992–2000: HRH 74 Roslev
- 2000–2004: Mors-Thy Håndbold

Senior clubs
- Years: Team
- 2004–2006: Mors-Thy Håndbold
- 2006–2011: Aalborg Håndbold
- 2011–2012: AG København
- 2012–2013: Bjerringbro-Silkeborg
- 2013–2015: HSV Hamburg
- 2015–2018: SG Flensburg-Handewitt
- 2018–2023: Paris Saint-Germain
- 2023–2026: Mors-Thy Håndbold
National team
Years	Team	Apps	(Gls)
2008–2022	Denmark	148	(254)
Medal record
Olympic Games
Gold medal – first place	2016 Rio de Janeiro	Team
Silver medal – second place	2020 Tokyo	Team
World Championship
Gold medal – first place	2019 Germany/Denmark
Silver medal – second place	2013 Spain
European Championship
Gold medal – first place	2012 Serbia
Bronze medal – third place	2022 Hungary/Slovakia
Junior World Championship
Bronze medal – third place	2007 Macedonia

Henrik Toft Hansen (born 18 December 1986) is a Danish former professional handball player who last played for Mors-Thy Håndbold. He was also a long-standing player of the Danish national team.

== Club career ==
Hansen started his career at Mors-Thy Håndbold, and later moved to Aalborg Håndbold.

In 2011, he signed for AG København, where his brother, René Toft Hansen already played. Here he won the Danish championship in 2012. When the club went bankrupt the same summer he signed for Bjerringbro-Silkeborg. In 2013, he signed for German Bundesliga team Hamburg. Here, he won the EHF Champions League.

In 2014, he joined league rivals SG Flensburg-Handewitt. In 2018, he won the German championship with the club.

The following summer, he joined Paris Saint-Germain. Here, he won the French championship every season from 2019 to 2023, as well as the 2021 and 2022 French cup and 2019 French league cup.

In 2023, he returned to Denmark to re-join Mors-Thy Håndbold. In August 2025 he announced his retirement after the 2025–26 season.

== International career ==
In 2008, Hansen's performances for AaB Håndbold earned him his first call-up for the Danish national team. His first major international tournament was the 2011 World Championship. He was a part of the team when it won the 2012 European Championship in Serbia, defeating the host nation in the final by 21–19. At the 2013 World Championship, he won silver medals with the Danish team.

At the 2016 Olympics, he won gold medals with the Danish team; the first ever Olympic gold medal for the Danish men's team.

In 2019, he won the World Championship with the Danish team; the first time Denmark ever won the title.

He missed the 2021 World Championship due to injuries. He played his last national team matches the following year.

== Personal life ==
He is the younger brother of René Toft Hansen. He has three younger siblings: Allan Toft Hansen (da) of Mors-Thy Håndbold, Majbritt Toft Hansen of Viborg HK and Jeanette Toft Hansen of Aarhus United. All five siblings have played on the pivot position.

Hansen is married to Swedish handballer Ulrika Toft Hansen. They became parents to a boy, Oliver, in November 2015 and to a girl, Ida in July 2018.

== Honours ==
- French Championship:
  - Gold: 2019, 2020, 2021, 2022, 2023
- French Cup:
  - Gold: 2021, 2022
- Danish Championship:
  - Gold: 2012
- German Championship
  - Silver: 2016, 2017
  - Gold: 2018
- German Cup
  - Silver: 2016, 2017
- EHF Cup:
  - Silver: 2015
- EHF Champions League:
  - Gold: 2013
- Summer Olympics:
  - Gold: 2016
- European Championship:
  - Gold: 2012
- World Championship:
  - Silver: 2013
