= Jesper Nøddesbo =

Danish handball player (born 1980)

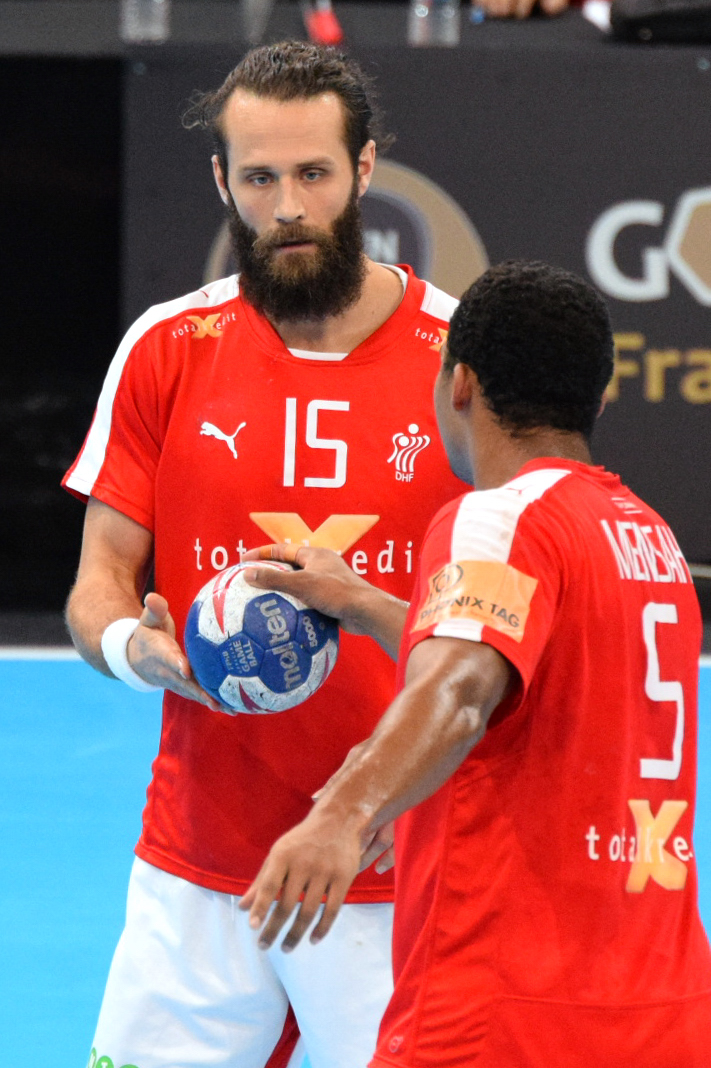
- Nøddesbo with Denmark in 2016

Personal information
- Full name: Jesper Brian Nøddesbo
- Nationality: Danish
- Born: 23 October 1980 (age 45) Herning, Denmark
- Height: 1.99 m (6 ft 6 1/2 in)

Sport
- Sport: Handball
- Position: Pivot
- Current club: Bjerringbro-Silkeborg
- Number: 18

Youth career
- Years: Team
- -1999: Hauge GIF

Senior clubs
- Years: Team
- 1999–2004: Team Tvis Holstebro
- 2004–2007: KIF Kolding
- 2007–2017: FC Barcelona
- 2017–2021: Bjerringbro-Silkeborg
National team
Years	Team	Apps	(Gls)
2001–2017	Denmark	223	(450)
Medal record
Olympic Games
Gold medal – first place	2016 Rio de Janeiro	Team
World Championship
Silver medal – second place	2011 Sweden
Silver medal – second place	2013 Spain
Bronze medal – third place	2007 Germany
European Championship
Gold medal – first place	2008 Norway
Silver medal – second place	2014 Denmark
Bronze medal – third place	2006 Switzerland

Jesper Brian Nøddesbo (born 23 October 1980) is a Danish former handball player.

He is European Champion by winning the 2008 European Men's Handball Championship in Norway with the Danish national team, and an Olympic champion from 2016. He also received a bronze medal at the 2006 European Men's Handball Championship, and again at the 2007 World Men's Handball Championship. At the 2014 European Championship he won silver medals. He retired from the Danish national team in 2017.

== Career ==
Nøddesbo joined Danish top league team Team Tvis Holstebro in 1999, where he played for 5 years, before joining KIF Kolding. Here he won the Danish Championship twice in 2005 and 2006, and the Danish Cup in 2005 and 2007. Nøddesbo was top scorer in the Danish Handball league in 2006. In 2007 he joined Spanish FC Barcelona where he won the league 7 times in a row from 2011 to 2017, as well as the EHF Champions League in 2011 and in 2015.

In 2017 he returned to Denmark to join Bjerringbro-Silkeborg, where he played for four years before retiring in 2021.
