= Kristian Asmussen =

Danish handballer (born 1971)

Personal information
- Full name: Kristian Asmussen
- Nationality: Danish (Denmark)
- Born: 16 April 1971 (age 55) Ramløse, Denmark
- Height: 1.93 m (6 ft 4 in)

Sport
- Sport: Handball
- Position: Goalkeeper
- Current club: Retired

Youth career
- Years: Team
- –: Ramløse IF

Senior clubs
- Years: Team
- –: Hellerup IK
- –2001: Team Helsinge
- 2001–2003: GWD Minden
- 2003–2006: BM Altea
- 2006–2009: Nordsjælland Håndbold
- 2009–2010: OV Helsingborg HK
- 2010–2012: Skjern Håndbold
- 2012–: Nordsjælland Håndbold
- 2012–2013: → SC Magdeburg (loan)
- 2015–2016: → KIF Kolding CPH (loan)
- 2016–2018: Team Helsinge
- 2018–2020: Nordsjælland Håndbold
National team
Years	Team	Apps	(Gls)
1995–2007	Denmark	74	(0)

Kristian Asmussen (born 16 April 1971) is a Danish former handballer, who played as the goalkeeper. He played for the Danish Handball League side KIF Kolding København and Nordsjælland Håndbold, and he has played abroad for the Spanish club BM Altea and the Swedish club OV Helsingborg HK.

He was until 2023 the most capped player for Nordsjælland Håndbold with 181 matches. His record was overtaken by his own nephew Carl-Emil Haunstrup.

Asmussen has played 74 matches for the Danish national handball team.
