= Mads Øris Nielsen =

Danish handball player (born 1981)

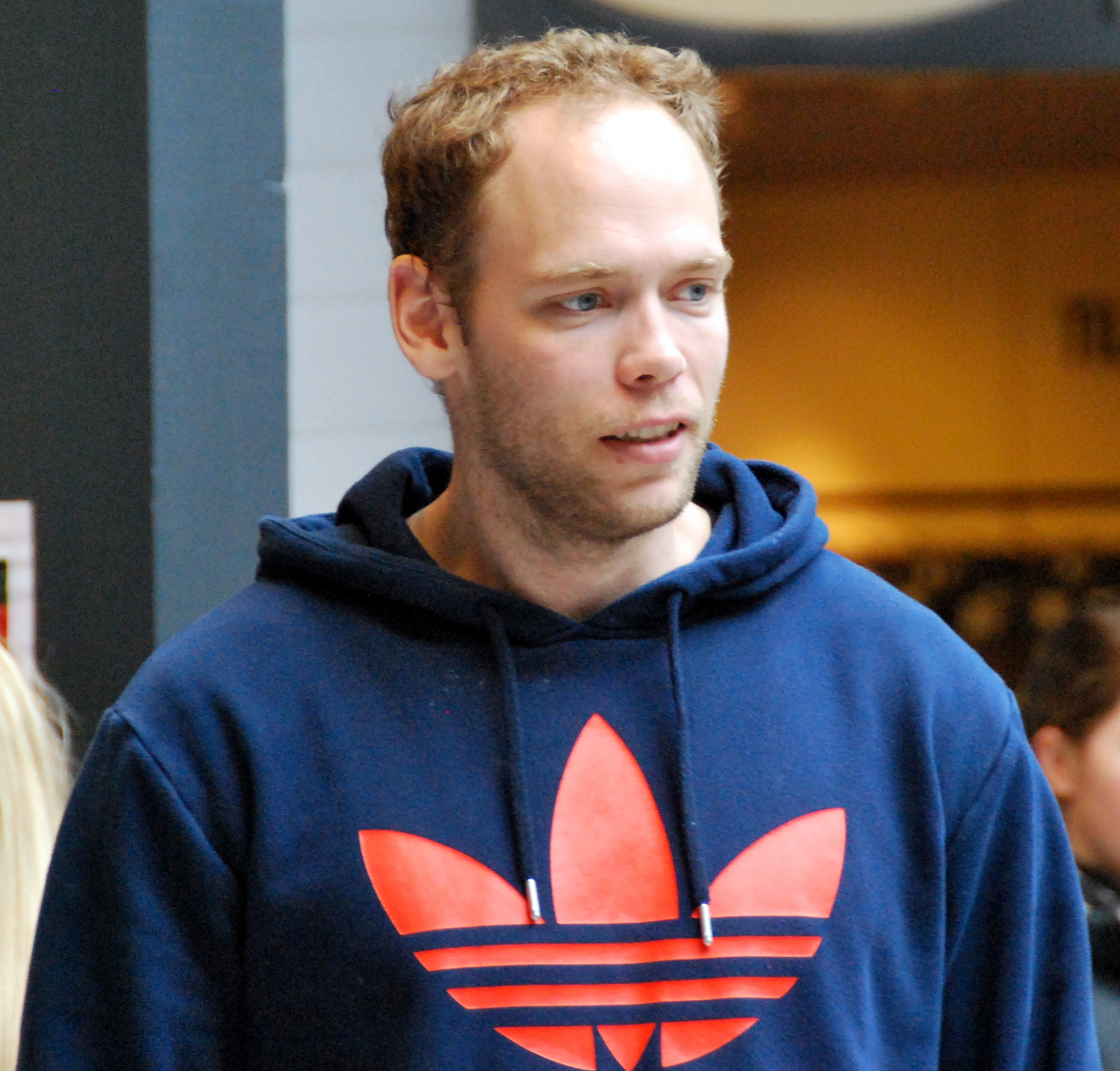

Personal information
- Nationality: Danish
- Born: 17 March 1981 (age 45) Bjerringbro, Denmark
- Height: 197 cm (78 in)

Sport
- Sport: Handball
- Position: Back
- Current club: Retired

Senior clubs
- Years: Team
- 2000–2005: Bjerringbro FH
- 2005–2014: Bjerringbro-Silkeborg Håndbold
- 2014–2017: Skive fH
- 2017–2021: Bjerringbro-Silkeborg Håndbold
National team
Years	Team	Apps	(Gls)
2008–2010	Denmark	27	(53)

Mads Øris Nielsen (born 17 March 1981) is a Danish former handballer. He played almost his entire career for in the Danish club Bjerringbro-Silkeborg Håndbold with the sole exception being three years from 2014 to 2017 at Skive fH. His two younger brothers, Mikkel Øris Nielsen and Nikolaj Øris Nielsen are also professional handballers.

He started playing professional handball in 2000 at Bjerringbro FH before the club fusioned with Silkeborg-Voel KFUM to become Bjerringbro-Silkeborg Håndbold. He is in the club's Hall of Fame and has even earned the nickname 'Mister BSH'. He played his first national game on 28 November 2008 and has scored 53 goals in 27 games. He retired after the 2020/2021 season.

After his playing career, he has worked at Jyske Bank.
