= 2005–06 Håndboldligaen (men's handball) =

Danish Handball League
- Season: 2005–06
- Champions: KIF Kolding 11th title
- Relegated: Mors-Thy Håndbold, Team Helsinge
- EHF Champions League: KIF Kolding, GOG
- Top goalscorer: (Denmark) Jesper Nøddesbo (178 goals)

The 2005–06 Danish Handball League season was the 70th edition of the Danish Handball League. KIF Kolding were the defending champions.

KIF Kolding won the title for a second year in a row, when they beat GOG in the finals. GOG won the regular season. HF Mors and Team Helsinge were relegated.

== League table ==
The regular season was a double round robin. The 4 best teams qualified for the championship playoff, while the last-placed team was relegated. The rest qualified for the relegation playoff.

=== Regular season ===
| | Team | P | W | D | L | G+ | G− | Pts |
|---|---|---|---|---|---|---|---|---|
| 1 | GOG | 26 | 23 | 1 | 2 | 881 | 728 | 47 |
| 2 | KIF Kolding | 26 | 19 | 2 | 5 | 854 | 727 | 40 |
| 3 | Skjern Håndbold | 26 | 18 | 0 | 8 | 835 | 735 | 36 |
| 4 | FCK Håndbold | 26 | 17 | 2 | 7 | 855 | 774 | 36 |
| 5 | Viborg HK | 26 | 17 | 0 | 9 | 845 | 769 | 34 |
| 6 | Aarhus GF | 26 | 11 | 4 | 11 | 817 | 823 | 26 |
| 7 | AAB Håndbold | 26 | 8 | 8 | 10 | 790 | 790 | 24 |
| 8 | BSV | 26 | 10 | 3 | 13 | 762 | 762 | 23 |
| 9 | TTH | 26 | 10 | 3 | 13 | 815 | 825 | 23 |
| 10 | Fredericia HK | 26 | 8 | 3 | 15 | 664 | 711 | 19 |
| 11 | TMS Ringsted | 26 | 8 | 2 | 16 | 700 | 765 | 18 |
| 12 | Ajax København | 26 | 7 | 2 | 17 | 702 | 835 | 16 |
| 13 | Elite 3000 | 26 | 6 | 1 | 19 | 704 | 818 | 13 |
| 14 | HF Mors | 26 | 3 | 3 | 20 | 721 | 883 | 9 |

| Champion Playoff |
| Relegation Playoff |
| Relegation |

=== Championship Round ===
The championship round was played with two semifinals; one between the 1st and 4th placed and one between the 2nd and 3rd placed teams.

== Semifinals ==
| Date | Teams | Result |
|---|---|---|
| 6 May | GOG – FCK | 37–35 |
| 12 May | FCK – GOG | 31–34 |

| Date | Teams | Result |
|---|---|---|
| 6 May | KIF Kolding – Skjern Håndbold | 34–31 |
| 12 May | Skjern Håndbold – KIF Kolding | 36–36 |

=== Finals ===
| Date | Teams | Result |
|---|---|---|
| 20 May | GOG – KIF Kolding | 26–26 |
| 23 May | KIF Kolding – GOG | 26–23 |
