= Mia Biltoft =

Danish handball player (born 1992)

Personal information
- Nationality: Danish
- Born: 3 April 1992 (age 34) Ringkøbing, Denmark
- Height: 1.76 m (5 ft 9 in)

Sport
- Sport: Handball
- Position: Pivot
- Current club: Retired

Youth career
- Years: Team
- –: Rindum SU
- –: FC Midtjylland Håndbold

Senior clubs
- Years: Team
- -2013: FC Midtjylland Håndbold
- 2012-2016: Ringkøbing Håndbold
- 2016-2018: SG BBM Bietigheim (Germany)
- 2019-2020: Thüringer HC (Germany)
National team
Years	Team	Apps	(Gls)
2016	Denmark	4	(3)
Medal record
European Junior Championship
Gold medal – first place	2011 Netherlands
European Youth Championship
Gold medal – first place	2009 Serbia
- Updated on 20 March 2024

Mia Biltoft (born 3 April 1992) is a Danish former handball player. She played on the Danish national team.

== Career ==
Biltoft started playing handball at Rindum SU. She then joined Ikast-Brande Elite Håndbold and was with them when the changed name to FC Midtjylland Håndbold, where she played for the senior team.

In 2012 she joined Danish second tier side Ringkøbing Håndbold on loan, and joined permanently in 2013. Ringkøbing Håndbold had been promoted to the first league, as Aalborg DH had gone bankrupt and thus had to leave the league.

From 2016 to 2018 she played for the German club SG BBM Bietigheim. Here she won the 2017 German championship.

In October 2019 she joined Thüringer HC, where she played until the rest of the season.

== National team ==
Biltoft played more than 100 games for various Danish youth teams. In 2009 she won the U-17 European championship and in 2011 she won the U-19 European championship with the Danish team.

She played 4 matches in total for the Senior national team, all in 2016.

== Private ==
She is married to fellow Danish handballer Patrick Wiesmach.
