= Per Leegaard =

Danish handball player

Personal information
- Nationality: Danish
- Born: 15 July 1985 (age 41) Thisted, Denmark
- Height: 1.93 m (6 ft 4 in)

Sport
- Sport: Handball
- Position: Right Back
- Current club: Retired

Youth career
- Years: Team
- -: Midtthy HK
- -: Thisted IK

Senior clubs
- Years: Team
- –: Team Tvis Holstebro
- –2009: Viborg HK
- 2009–2012: Skjern Håndbold
National team
Years	Team	Apps	(Gls)
2004–2012	Denmark	35	(102)
Medal record
Representing Denmark
Men's handball
World Championships
Bronze medal – third place	2007 Germany	Team competition
European Championships
Bronze medal – third place	2006 Switzerland	Team competition

Per Leegaard (born 15 July 1982 in Thisted, Denmark) is a Danish former team handball player. He played for the Danish clubs Team Tvis Holstebro, Viborg HK and Skjern Håndbold. He retired in 2012 due to muscle injuries after being in rehabilitation for a year.

He has made several appearances for the Danish national handball team, winning bronze medals at the 2006 European Men's Handball Championship and the 2007 World Men's Handball Championship.
