= René Toft Hansen =

Danish handball player (born 1984)

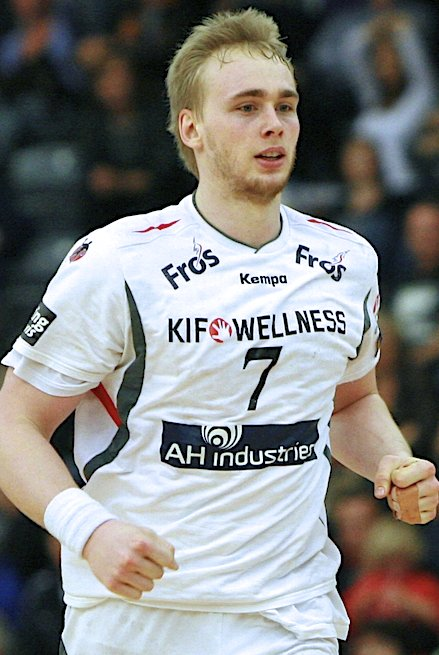
- Hansen playing for KIF Kolding in 2009

Personal information
- Nationality: Danish
- Born: 1 November 1984 (age 41) Skive, Denmark
- Height: 2.00 m (6 ft 7 in)

Sport
- Sport: Handball
- Position: Pivot
- Current club: Bjerringbro-Silkeborg Håndbold
- Number: 19

Youth career
- Years: Team
- –: HRH 74 Roslev
- –: Skive fH

Senior clubs
- Years: Team
- –2003: HF Mors 2000
- 2003–2007: Viborg HK
- 2007–2010: KIF Kolding
- 2010–2012: AG København
- 2012–2018: THW Kiel
- 2018–2019: Telekom Veszprém
- 2019–2020: Benfica
- 2020–2025: Bjerringbro-Silkeborg Håndbold
National team
Years	Team	Apps	(Gls)
2005–2020	Denmark	146	(205)
Medal record
Olympic Games
Gold medal – first place	2016 Rio de Janeiro	Team
World Championship
Gold medal – first place	2019 Germany/Denmark
Silver medal – second place	2011 Sweden
Silver medal – second place	2013 Spain
European Championship
Gold medal – first place	2012 Serbia
Silver medal – second place	2014 Denmark
Junior World Championship
Gold medal – first place	2005 Hungary

René Toft Hansen (born 1 November 1984), is a Danish former professional handballer for Bjerringbro-Silkeborg Håndbold and the Denmark national team. He is the oldest of 5 siblings, all of which have been handball players: His brother Henrik, who also played for the Denmark national team, and the three younger siblings: Allan Toft Hansen (da) of Mors-Thy Håndbold, Majbritt Toft Hansen of Viborg HK and Jeanette Toft Hansen. All five siblings have played on the pivot position.

== Career ==
Hansen made his senior debut for HF Mors. In 2003, he joined Viborg HK, which had just been relegated to the 1st Division. In 2004, he extended his contract at the club. In the 2006–07, he reached the final of the Danish championship, but lost to GOG Svendborg TGI.

In 2007, he joined KIF Kolding, which had bought him. Here, he won the Danish championship in 2009. In July 2010, he joined AG København. Here, he won the 2011 and 2012 Danish championships. The latter of which he played with his brother, Henrik Toft Hansen.

Hansen moved to THW Kiel for the 2012–2013 season. He was named the new captain for THW Kiel beginning in the 2015–16 season, after Filip Jícha's transfer to FC Barcelona. With Kiel, he won the 2013 and 2017 DHB-Pokal and the 2013, 2014 and 2015 German Championships. In 2016, he ceased to be the Kiel captain, leaving the position for Domagoj Duvnjak at Hansen's own wish.

In 2018, he joined Hungarian team KC Veszprém. Here, he won the Hungarian championship in the one season he played for the club. In 2019, he joined Portuguese side Benfica.

In 2020, he returned to Denmark and joined Bjerringbro-Silkeborg. In October 2024, he announced his intention to retire after the 2024–25 season.

== National team ==
Hansen had his first game with the Denmark national team in 2005.

Hansen is European Champion with the Danes, after winning the 2012 Championship in Serbia, defeating the host nation in the final, 21–19. Also, he won the silver medal at the World Men's Handball Championship in 2013 in Spain (after losing to Spain 35–19) and in 2011 in Sweden (after losing to France in the overtime 35–37)

At the 2013 World Championship and the 2014 European Championship, he won silver medals with the Danish team at both occasions.

He missed the 2015 World Championship due to injury.

At the 2016 Olympics, he won gold medals with the Danish team; the first ever Olympic gold medal for the Danish men's team.

In 2019, he won the World Championship with the Danish team; the first time Denmark ever won the title.

== Individual awards ==
- All-Star Line Player of the European Championship: 2012
- Best Defender of the EHF Champions League: 2015

== Honours ==
- Danish Championship:
  - Gold: 2009, 2011, 2012
  - Silver: 2007, 2010, 2021
  - Bronze: 2022
- Danish Cup:
  - Gold: 2011
- German Championship:
  - Gold: 2013, 2014, 2015
- German Cup:
  - Gold: 2013
