= Majbritt Toft Hansen =

Danish handball player (born 1993)

Personal information
- Nationality: Danish
- Born: 27 April 1993 (age 33) Skive, Denmark
- Height: 1.83 m (6 ft 0 in)

Sport
- Sport: Handball
- Position: Pivot
- Current club: SønderjyskE
- Number: 21

Senior clubs
- Years: Team
- 2010–2015: Skive fH
- 2015–2017: SK Aarhus
- 2017–2019: Aarhus United
- 2019–2021: Viborg HK
- 2021–2024: HH Elite
- 2021–2024: Jelling fS
- 2024–: SønderjyskE
National team
Years	Team	Apps	(Gls)
2020–2021	Denmark	14	(5)

Majbritt Toft Hansen (born 27 April 1993) is a Danish handball player for SønderjyskE and previously the Danish national team.

== Career ==
Toft Hansen began her senior career at Skive fH before moving to SK Aarhus, later Aarhus United. In 2019 she signed a two-year contract with league rivals Viborg HK.

She is the younger sister of René Toft Hansen and Henrik Toft Hansen, and the older sister of Allan Toft Hansen and Jeanette Toft Hansen. Like her three brothers Toft Hansen plays the pivot position.

She represented Denmark at the 2020 European Women's Handball Championship.
