= Skjern Håndbold =

Danish handball club

- Founded: 1 April 1992; 34 years ago
- Arena: Skjern Bank Arena, Skjern
- Capacity: 3500
- President: Carsten Thygesen
- Head coach: Oscar Carlén
- League: Håndboldligaen
- 2025–26: Håndboldligaen, 8th
Home	Away

Skjern Handball (Danish: Skjern Håndbold) is a handball club from Skjern, Denmark. Currently, Skjern Handball competes in the Danish Handball League, which they have won twice, in 1999 and in 2018. They have also achieved international success, by winning the EHF Challenge Cup twice, in 2002 and 2003. The home arena of Skjern Håndbold is Skjern Bank Arena. This handball club has developed several professional handball players such as Kasper Søndergaard, Jesper Jensen, and Claus Møller Jakobsen.

== History ==
The club was founded in 1992 as a merger between Skjern Gymnastikforening af 1916 and Skjern KFUM og KFUK's Idrætsforening to promote handball in Western Jutland. The club started in the third tier, the 2nd Division.

In the 1997/1998 season the team was promoted from the 1st Division to the top flight, and the year after in 98/99 they won the Danish Championship. This makes Skjern Håndbold the first Danish side to win a title as a newly promoted team. The team also won the Danish cup the same season beating Frederiksberg IF in the final. Under Henrik Kronborg the club won the Danish Cup again in 2016, and in 2018 the team won their second Danish Championship.

In the 2024-25 season the team broke their attendance record with 2,963 spectators per match.

Location of Skjern Håndbold

== Kits ==
HOME
2014–15	2017–19

AWAY
2014–15	2017–19	2020–21

== Achievements ==
- Danish Championship: 2
  - Gold: 1999, 2018
  - Silver: 2003, 2015, 2017, 2025
  - Bronze: 2006, 2011, 2013, 2019
- Danish Handball Cup: 3
  - Gold: 1999, 2014, 2016
  - Silver: 1994, 1998, 2003, 2004, 2012, 2022
- Danish Super Cup: 1
  - Gold: 2017
- EHF Cup:
  - Bronze: 2015
- EHF Challenge Cup: 2
  - Gold: 2002, 2003

== Team ==
=== Current squad ===
Squad for the 2026–27 season

Goalkeepers

- 1 (Denmark) Svend Rughave
- 12 (Sweden) Kristian Zetterlund

Wingers
LW

- 19 (Denmark) Bjarke Christensen
- 70 (Denmark) Simon Sejer Kristensen

RW

- 20 (Sweden) Alfred Arnelin
- 21 (Denmark) René Rasmussen

Pivots

- 7 (Bosnia and Herzegovina) Senjamin Burić
- 11 (Denmark) Joachim Møller
- 25 (Sweden) Hugo Stuivers
- 36 (Denmark) Julius Raaholt

Back players
LB

- 2 (Denmark) Mads Bjergfelt
- 5 (Denmark) Jacob Holm
- 23 (Denmark) Marcus Midtgaard

CB

- 22 (Denmark) Mads Mensah Larsen
- 24 (Denmark) Marius Winckler Nørsøller (on loan at (Denmark) HØJ Elite)
- 27 (Sweden) Axel Månsson

RB

- 4 (Denmark) Jon Lindenchrone Andersen

DF

- 26 (Denmark) Jonathan Würtz

=== Staff ===
Staff for the 2026–27 season

- Head Coach: (Sweden) Oscar Carlén
- Assistant Coach: (Denmark) Rasmus Wilbek
- Physiotherapist: (Denmark) Hans Jensen
- Physical Trainer: (Denmark) Phillip Holm
- Team Leader: (Denmark) Jørgen Jørgensen

=== Transfers ===
Transfers for the 2026–27 season

Joining

- (Sweden) Axel Månsson (CB) from (Sweden) IFK Kristianstad
- (Sweden) Hugo Stuivers (LP) from (Sweden) HK Malmö
- (Sweden) Alfred Arnelin (RW) from (Sweden) OV Helsingborg HK
- (Denmark) Jacob Holm (CB) from (France) Paris Saint-Germain
- (Denmark) Joachim Møller (LP) from (Denmark) TMS Ringsted
- (Denmark) Svend Rughave (GK) from (Denmark) Mors-Thy Håndbold

Leaving

- (Portugal) Joaquim Nazaré (RB) to (Portugal) S.L. Benfica
- (Denmark) Emil Bergholt (LP) (to (Germany) SG Flensburg-Handewitt)
- (Denmark) Christoffer Bonde (GK) to (France) HBC Nantes
- (Denmark) Jakob Rasmussen (CB) to (Denmark) Skanderborg AGF Håndbold
- (Denmark) Morten Vium (RW) (Retires)
- (Denmark) Marius Nørsøller (CB) on loan at (Denmark) HØJ Elite

=== Transfer history ===
Transfers for the 2025–26 season

Joining

- (Sweden) Kristian Zetterlund (GK) from (Sweden) HK Malmö
- (Denmark) Mads Mensah Larsen (CB) from (Germany) SG Flensburg-Handewitt
- (Denmark) Marcus Midtgaard (LB) from (Denmark) Mors-Thy Håndbold
- (Denmark) Jon Andersen (RB) from (Germany) Rhein-Neckar Löwen
- (Denmark) Jonathan Würtz (LB) from (Denmark) Ribe-Esbjerg HH

Leaving

- (France) Noah Gaudin (CB) to (France) Paris Saint-Germain
- (Norway) Vetle Rønningen (LP) to (Denmark) Aalborg Håndbold
- (Denmark) Viktor Bergholt (LW) to (Denmark) SønderjyskE Handbold
- (Denmark) Tobias Mygind (LB) to (Norway) Halden Topphåndball
- (Denmark) Tim Winkler (GK) (Retires)
- (Denmark) Lasse Mikkelsen (CB) (Retires)
- (Norway) Eivind Tangen (RB) (Retires)
- (Denmark) Jonathan Havndrup Sørensen (RW) (to ?)
- (Serbia) Simo Šijan (CB) loan back to (Serbia) RK Vojvodina

== European Handball ==
=== EHF Champions League ===
Season	Round	Club	Home	Away	Aggregate
1999–00	Qualification	(Netherlands) Horn Sittardia	31–26	28–22	59–48
1999–00	Group Stage; Group C	(Croatia) Badel 1862 Zagreb	24–33	19–22	4th place
1999–00	Group Stage; Group C	(Ukraine) ZTR Zaporizhzhia	16–20	20–23	4th place
1999–00	Group Stage; Group C	(Switzerland) TV Suhr	26–28	29–24	4th place
2003–04	Group Stage; Group G	(Hungary) Veszprém KC	23–26	29–33	2nd place
2003–04	Group Stage; Group G	(Poland) Vive Kielce	26–22	25–25	2nd place
2003–04	Group Stage; Group G	(Bosnia and Herzegovina) RK Bosna Sarajevo	30–20	18–27	2nd place
2003–04	Round of 16	(Germany) SC Magdeburg	30–25	24–34	54–59
2015–16	Group Stage; Group D	(Ukraine) Motor Zaporizhzhia	36–36	26–31	2nd place
2015–16	Group Stage; Group D	(Switzerland) Kadetten Schaffhausen	25–29	30–24	2nd place
2015–16	Group Stage; Group D	(Romania) HC Baia Mare	38–28	28–28	2nd place
2015–16	Group Stage; Group D	(Norway) Elverum Håndball	34–29	37–23	2nd place
2015–16	Group Stage; Group D	(North Macedonia) RK Metalurg Skopje	20–19	25–24	2nd place
2015–16	Playoffs	(Belarus) HC Meshkov Brest	31–31	23–27	54–58
2017–18	Group Stage; Group C	(Spain) CB Ademar León	33–25	31–26	1st place
2017–18	Group Stage; Group C	(Slovenia) RK Gorenje Velenje	35–20	29–31	1st place
2017–18	Group Stage; Group C	(Norway) Elverum Håndball	35–25	32–27	1st place
2017–18	Group Stage; Group C	(Switzerland) Kadetten Schaffhausen	32–22	24–25	1st place
2017–18	Group Stage; Group C	(Romania) Dinamo București	39–28	36–23	1st place
2017–18	Playoffs	(Ukraine) HC Motor Zaporizhzhia	33–26	30–32	63–58
2017–18	Round of 16	(Hungary) Veszprém KC	32–25	29–34	61–59
2017–18	Quarter-final	(France) HBC Nantes	27–27	27–32	54–59
2018–19	Group Stage; Group B	(France) Paris Saint-Germain	24–26	28–38	7th place
2018–19	Group Stage; Group B	(Hungary) MOL-Pick Szeged	26–29	33–33	7th place
2018–19	Group Stage; Group B	(Germany) SG Flensburg-Handewitt	24–31	22–26	7th place
2018–19	Group Stage; Group B	(France) HBC Nantes	32–34	27–35	7th place
2018–19	Group Stage; Group B	(Ukraine) HC Motor Zaporizhzhia	37–33	23–33	7th place
2018–19	Group Stage; Group B	(Croatia) PPD Zagreb	31–31	29–32	7th place
2018–19	Group Stage; Group B	(Slovenia) Celje Pivovarna Laško	35–32	27–26	7th place

=== EHF Cup ===
Season	Round	Club	Home	Away	Aggregate
2004–05	Round 2	(Bulgaria) Vadislav '95 Spartak Varna	38–16	39–18	77–34
2004–05	Round 3	(Russia) Lukoil-Dynamo Astrakhan	32–37	30–31	62–68
2006–07	Round 3	(Belgium) KV Sasja HC	35–27	29–21	64–48
2006–07	1/8 final	(Sweden) IK Sävehof	39–28	25–30	64–58
2006–07	1/4 final	(France) Dunkerque	27–25	28–23	55–48
2006–07	1/2 final	(Spain) CAI BM Aragón	29–25	24–29	53–54
2011–12	Round 3	(Ukraine) HC Dinamo-Poltava	33–21	21–26	54–47
2011–12	Last 16	(France) Dunkerque	28–24	18–24	46–48
2013–14	Round 2	(Czech Republic) Ronal Jičín	29–21	38–21	67–42
2013–14	Round 3	(Serbia) RK Vojvodina	31–24	24–18	55–42
2013–14	Group Stage; Group B	(France) Montpellier Handball	23–26	25–27	3rd place
2013–14	Group Stage; Group B	(Portugal) Sporting CP	25–32	28–30	3rd place
2013–14	Group Stage; Group B	(North Macedonia) RK Strumica	31–20	24–23	3rd place
2014–15	Round 2	(Austria) Bregenz	36–32	36–27	72–59
2014–15	Round 3	(Hungary) Orosháza	40–20	32–25	72–45
2014–15	Group Stage; Group C	(Germany) Füchse Berlin	32–28	24–29	
2014–15	Group Stage; Group C	(Portugal) Porto	27–21	23–24	
2014–15	Group Stage; Group C	(Serbia) Vojvodina	32–23	25–23	
2014–15	Quarter-finals	(Germany) MT Melsungen	25–20	23–28	48–48
2014–15	Semifinal	(Germany) HSV Hamburg	23–27		
2014–15	Third place match	(Slovenia) RK Gorenje	27–22		

=== EHF Cup Winners' Cup ===
Season	Round	Club	Home	Away	Aggregate	Comment
2005–06	Round 2	(Italy) A.S. Pallamano Secchia	36–18	28–40	76–46	–
2005–06	Round 3	(Slovenia) RK Gold Club Kozina	38–32	30–29	67–62	–
2005–06	1/8 Final	(Poland) Wisła Płock	30–26	30–32	62–56	–
2005–06	1/4 Final	(Romania) HCM Constanța	31–35	35–28	59–70	–

=== EHF Challenge Cup ===
Season	Round	Club	Home	Away	Aggregate	Comment
2002–03	Round 3	(Sweden) IFK Skövde	24–23	25–27	51–48	–
2002–03	Round 4	(Austria) Alpla HC Hard	25–21	28–24	49–49	–
2002–03	1/4 Final	(Italy) SC Torggler Group Merano	30–25	24–25	55–49	–
2002–03	1/2 Final	(Sweden) IK Sävehof	31–27	24–24	55–51	–
2002–03	Final	(Greece) "Filippos" Verias	35–25	30–27	62–55	–
2001–02	Round 2	(North Macedonia) RK Metalurg Skopje	33–25	21–34	67–46	–
2001–02	Round 3	(Portugal) A.A. Aguas Santas	27–18	26–20	47–44	–
2001–02	Round 4	(Ukraine) Shakhtyor Akademi Donetsk	25–24	31–31	56–55	–
2001–02	1/4 Final	(Italy) Pallamano Rubiera	28–26	20–30	58–46	–
2001–02	1/2 Final	(France) US d'Ivry Handball	33–23	24–26	59–47	–
2001–02	Final	(North Macedonia) RK "Pelister" Bitola	34–17	27–20	54–44	–

== Notable former players ==
Men

- (Denmark) Claus Møller Jakobsen
- (Denmark) Jesper Jensen
- (Denmark) Michael V. Knudsen
- (Denmark) Lars Møller Madsen
- (Denmark) René Hamann-Boeriths
- (Denmark) Thomas Klitgaard
- (Denmark) Lasse Mikkelsen
- (Denmark) Henrik Møllgaard
- (Denmark) Anders Eggert
- (Denmark) Per Leegaard
- (Denmark) Sune Agerschou
- (Denmark) Rune Ohm
- (Denmark) Daniel Svensson
- (Denmark) Kristian Asmussen
- (Denmark) Lasse Mikkelsen
- (Denmark) Jeppe Riber
- (Iceland) Vignir Svavarsson
- (Iceland) Aron Kristjánsson
- (Norway) Magnus Dahl
- (Norway) Bjarte Myrhol
- (Norway) Robin Paulsen Haug
- (Norway) Simen Holand Pettersen
- (Serbia) Tibor Ivanišević
- (Sweden) Markus Olsson

== Notable former coaches ==
- (Serbia) Veroljub Kosovac
- (Denmark) Anders Dahl-Nielsen
- (Iceland) Aron Kristjánsson
