= Andreas Holst Jensen =

Danish handball player (born 1994)

Personal information
- Nationality: Danish
- Born: 1 December 1994 (age 31) Lemvig, Denmark
- Height: 2.02 m (6 ft 8 in)

Sport
- Sport: Handball
- Position: Left back
- Current club: SG Flensburg-Handewitt
- Number: 18

Senior clubs
- Years: Team
- 2012–2015: Lemvig-Thyborøn Håndbold
- 2015–2017: GOG Håndbold
- 2017–2022: Aalborg Håndbold
- 2022–2023: Montpellier Handball
- 2023–2024: Rhein-Neckar Löwen
- 2025–: SG Flensburg-Handewitt
National team
Years	Team	Apps	(Gls)
2015–	Denmark	4	(21)
Medal record
Youth World Championship
Gold medal – first place	2013 Hungary
European Youth Olympic Festival
Gold medal – first place	2011 Turkey
Youth European Championship
Bronze medal – third place	2012 Austria

Andreas Holst Jensen (born 1 December 1994) is a Danish handball player for SG Flensburg-Handewitt.

== Achievements ==
- EHF Champions League
  - Runner-up: 2021
- Danish Handball League
  - Winner: 2019, 2020, 2021
  - Runner-up: 2022
- Danish Cup
  - Winner: 2018, 2021
  - Runner-up: 2020
- Danish Super Cup
  - Winner: 2019, 2020, 2021
- IHF Super Globe
  - Bronze medal: 2021
