= Patrick Wiesmach =

Danish handball player (born 1990)

Personal information
- Full name: Patrick Wiesmach Larsen
- Nationality: Danish
- Born: 23 March 1990 (age 36) Vodskov, Denmark
- Height: 1.78 m (5 ft 10 in)

Sport
- Sport: Handball
- Position: Right Wing
- Current club: Aalborg Håndbold
- Number: 4

Senior clubs
- Years: Team
- 2009–2010: Aalborg Håndbold
- 2010–2016: TTH Holstebro
- 2016–2018: Aalborg Håndbold
- 2018–2023: SC DHfK Leipzig
- 2023–: Aalborg Håndbold
National team
Years	Team	Apps	(Gls)
2011–	Denmark	27	(61)
- Updated on 20 March 2026

Patrick Wiesmach (born 23 March 1990) is a Danish handball player for Aalborg Håndbold and the Danish national team.

== Career ==
Wiesmach started playing handball at his hometown club Vodskov IF and Hjallerup IF before joining Aalborg Håndbold in 2005. From 2010 to 2016 he played for TTH Holstebro.In the 2015-16 season he was the topscorer in the Danish league with 212 goals.

He then returned to Aalborg Håndbold for a second time in 2016, before joining German club SC DHfK Leipzig in 2016. He returned home from SC DHfK Leipzig for a third time in 2022

In 2025 he won the Danish Cup with Aalborg Håndbold. Later the same season he won the Danish championship.

=== National team ===
He made his debut for the Danish national team on 4 November 2011 against Norway.

== Private ==
He is married to fellow Danish handballer Mia Biltoft.
