= Kasper Søndergaard =

Danish handball player (born 1981)

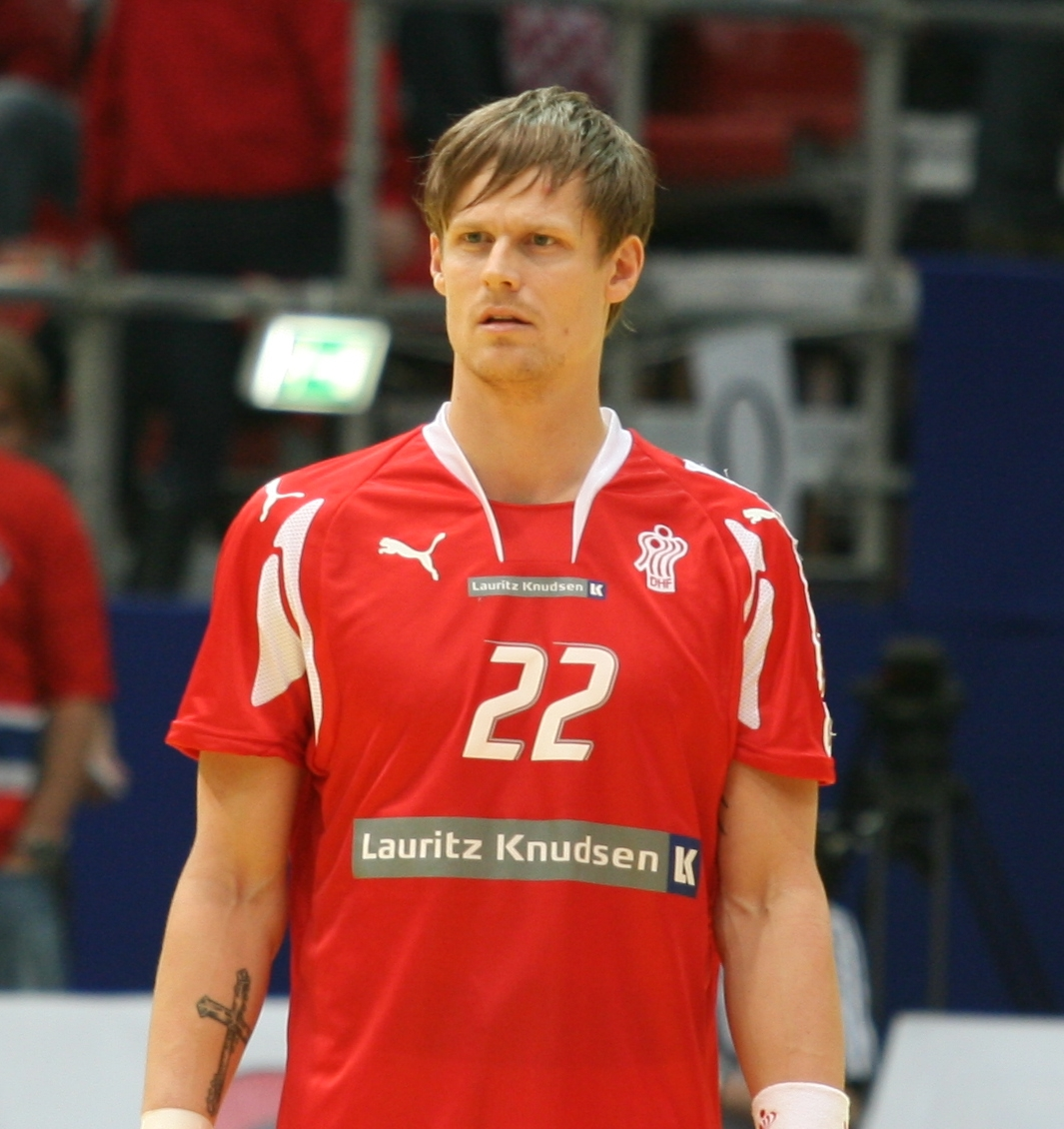

Personal information
- Full name: Kasper Søndergaard Sarup
- Nationality: Danish
- Born: 9 June 1981 (age 45) Skive, Denmark
- Height: 1.92 m (6 ft 4 in)

Sport
- Sport: Handball
- Position: Right back
- Current club: Skjern Håndbold (assistant coach)

Senior clubs
- Years: Team
- 1999–2003: Ikast-Bording
- 2003–2007: Aarhus GF
- 2007–2011: KIF Kolding
- 2011–2020: Skjern Håndbold
National team
Years	Team	Apps	(Gls)
2004–2017	Denmark	184	(395)
Medal record
Olympic Games
Gold medal – first place	2016 Rio de Janeiro	Team
World Championship
Silver medal – second place	2013 Spain
Silver medal – second place	2011 Spain
Bronze medal – third place	2007 Germany
European Championship
Gold medal – first place	2012 Serbia
Gold medal – first place	2008 Norway
Silver medal – second place	2014 Denmark

Kasper Søndergaard Sarup (born 9 June 1981) is a Danish former handball player for Skjern Håndbold and the Danish national team and current handball coach.

He is a double European champion, winning the 2008 and 2012 European Men's Handball Championship with the Danish national team. He also has three medals from the World Men's Handball Championship, a bronze in 2009 and two silver, in 2011 and 2013.

== Career ==
Søndergaard started at Ikast fS, but his breakthrough came at AGF Håndbold, who he signed for in 2003. In 2005 he came second in the Danish league with AGF, before switching to KIF Kolding. Here he won the Danish League in 2009. In 2011 he switched to Skjern Håndbold, where he played out the last 11 years of his playing career.

After his playing career he has worked as the assistant coach for the Danish handball club Skjern Håndbold, and he has said that he aspires to become a head coach one day.
