= Sune Agerschou =

Danish handballer (born 1974)

Personal information
- Full name: Sune Duevang Agerschou
- Nationality: Danish
- Born: 10 March 1974 (age 52) Esbjerg, Denmark
- Height: 191 cm (75 in)

Sport
- Sport: Handball
- Position: Goalkeeper

Senior clubs
- Years: Team
- –: Team Esbjerg
- 1999-2001: GOG
- 2001-2002: SC Magdeburg
- 2002-2010: Skjern Håndbold
National team
Years	Team	Apps	(Gls)
1999-2008	Denmark	33	(0)

Teams managed
- 2010-2019: Ribe-Esbjerg HH (sporting director)
- 11/2017-12/2017: Ribe-Esbjerg HH

Sune Agerschou (born 10 March 1974) is a Danish former handballer. He played for Danish Handball League side Skjern Håndbold, GOG Svendborg and German league side SC Magdeburg, with whom he won the Champions League in 2002.

He made 33 appearances for the Danish national team.

He ended his career at the age of 36 in 2010 due to a concussion. Afterwards he became the sporting director at Ribe-Esbjerg HH, where he was until the end of the 2018-2019 season. In November 2017 he became the head coach at the club, replacing Jan Leslie. He was however forced to stop already a month later, as his concussion from 2010 continued to trouble him.
