= Bjerringbro =

- town
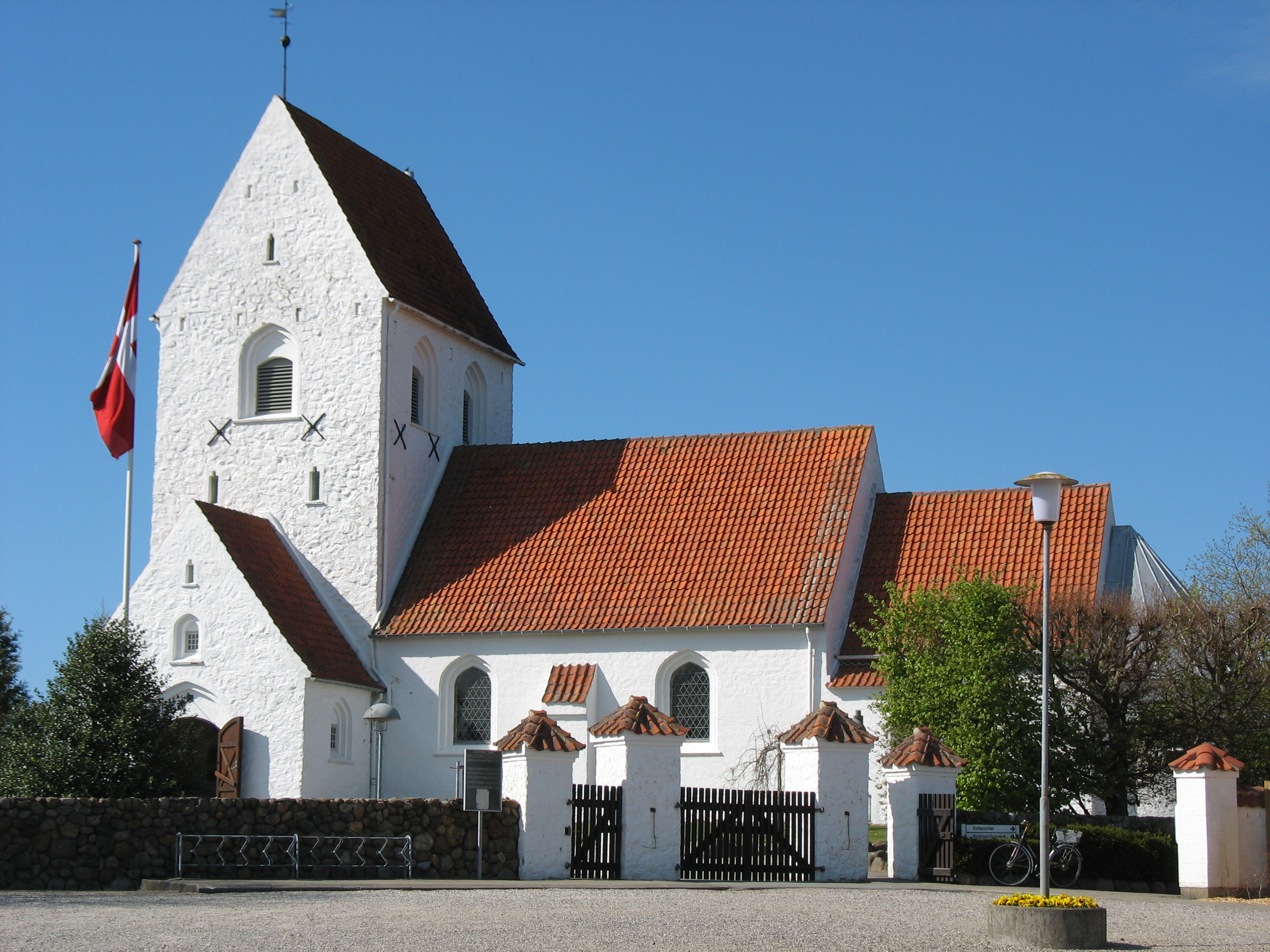
- Bjerringbro Church

- Location in Denmark Bjerringbro (Central Denmark Region)
- Coordinates: 56°22′34″N 9°39′23″E
- Country: Denmark
- Region: Central Denmark (Midtjylland)
- Municipality: Viborg

Area
  - Urban: 6.4 km^{2} (2.5 sq mi)

Population (2026)
  - Urban: 7,407
  - Urban density: 1,200/km^{2} (3,000/sq mi)
  - Gender: 3,682 males and 3,751 females
- Time zone: UTC+1 (CET)
  - Summer (DST): UTC+2 (CEST)
- Postal code: DK-8850 Bjerringbro

Bjerringbro is a railway town located at the railway line between Viborg and Randers and lying on both sides of the Gudenå (River Guden). Until 1 January 2007 it was the municipal seat of the former Bjerringbro Municipality and today, with a population of 7,407 (1 January 2026), it is the second largest town of Viborg Municipality, Central Denmark Region in Denmark.

The town is the site of the headquarters of Grundfos, the world's largest pump manufacturer.

== Sports ==
Bjerringbro is the home of two handball clubs, that features in the women's and men's league, respectively: Bjerringbro FH and Bjerringbro-Silkeborg. Bjerringbro-Silkeborg has won the Danish Championship once, in 2016.

== Gallery ==
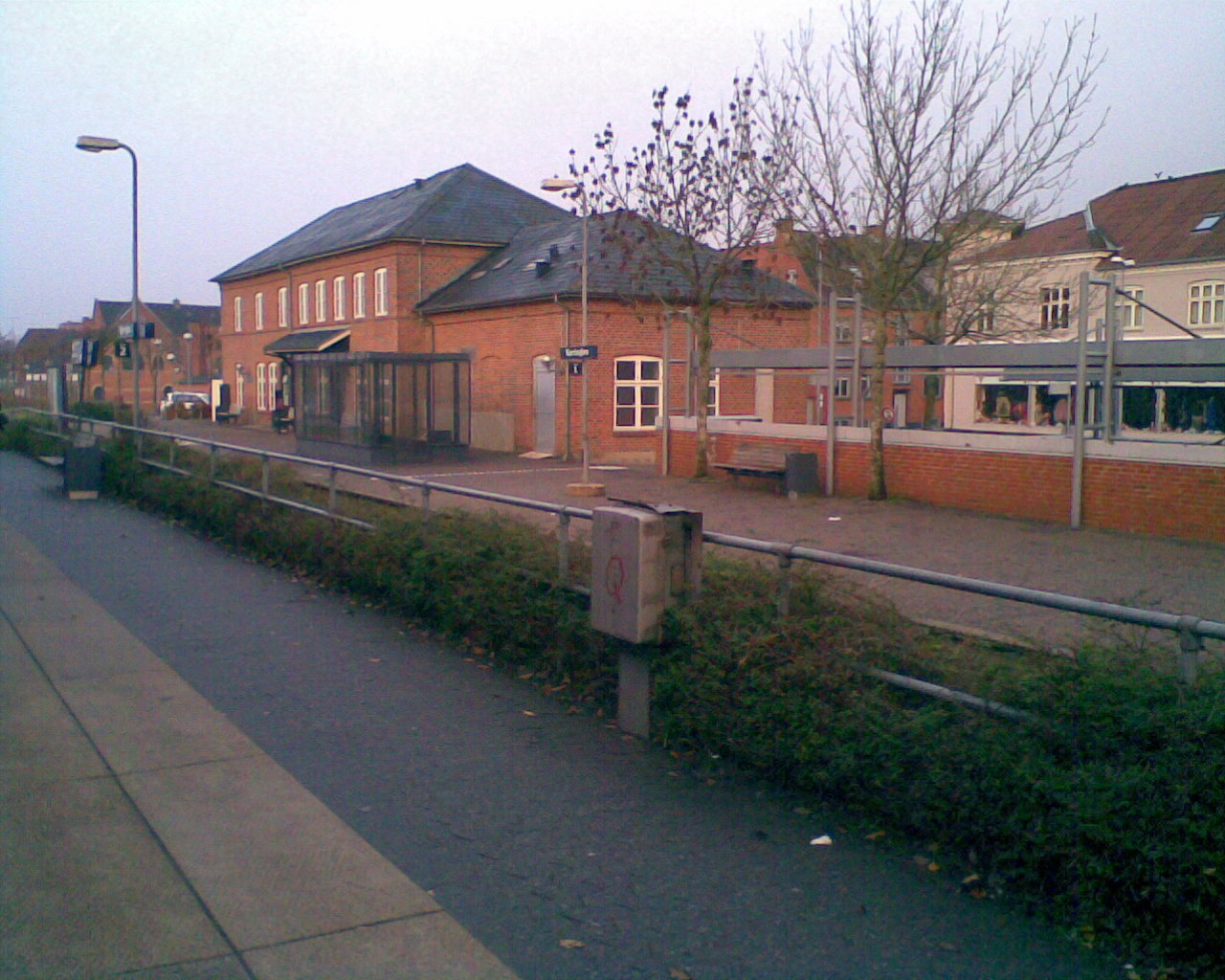
Bjerringbro railway station

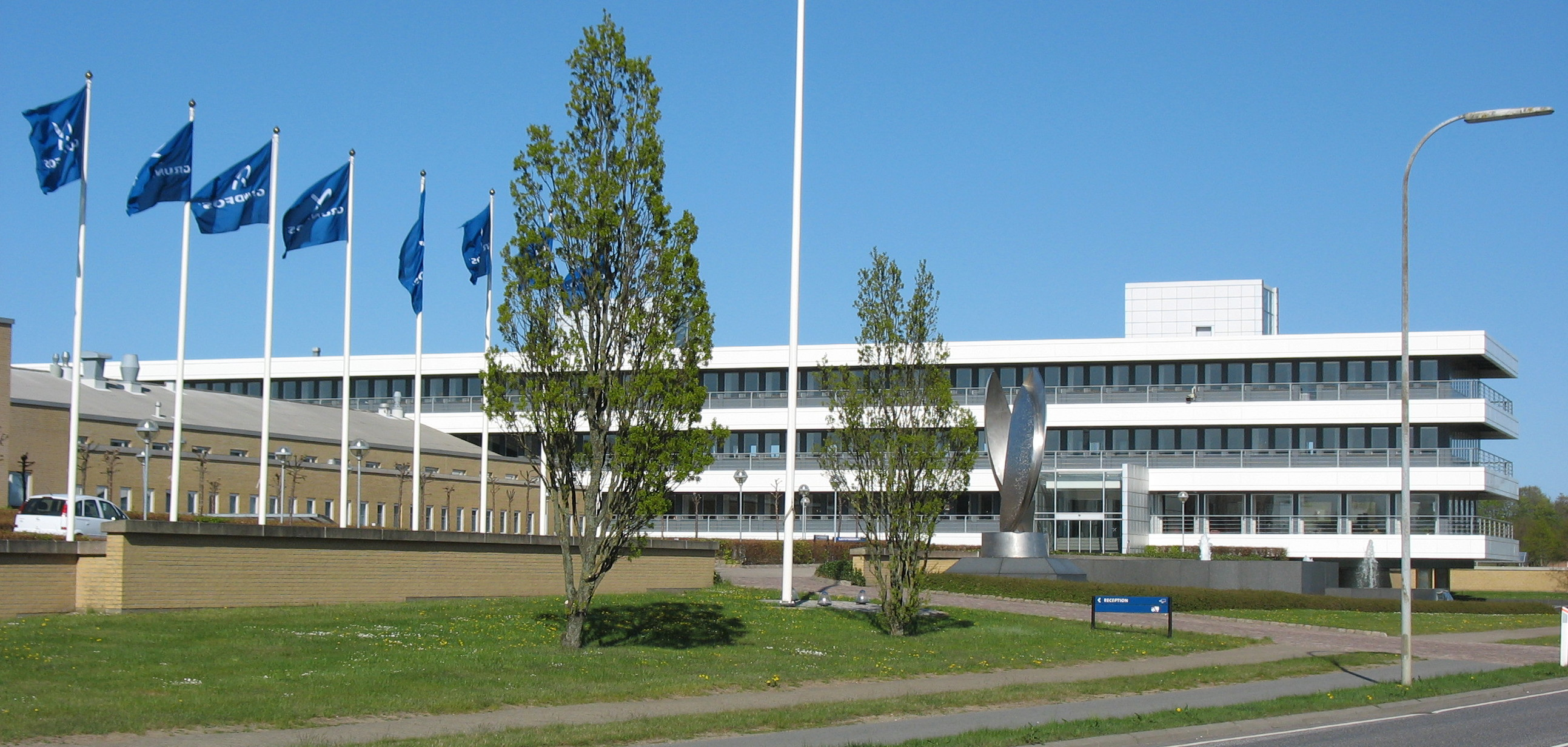
Grundfos

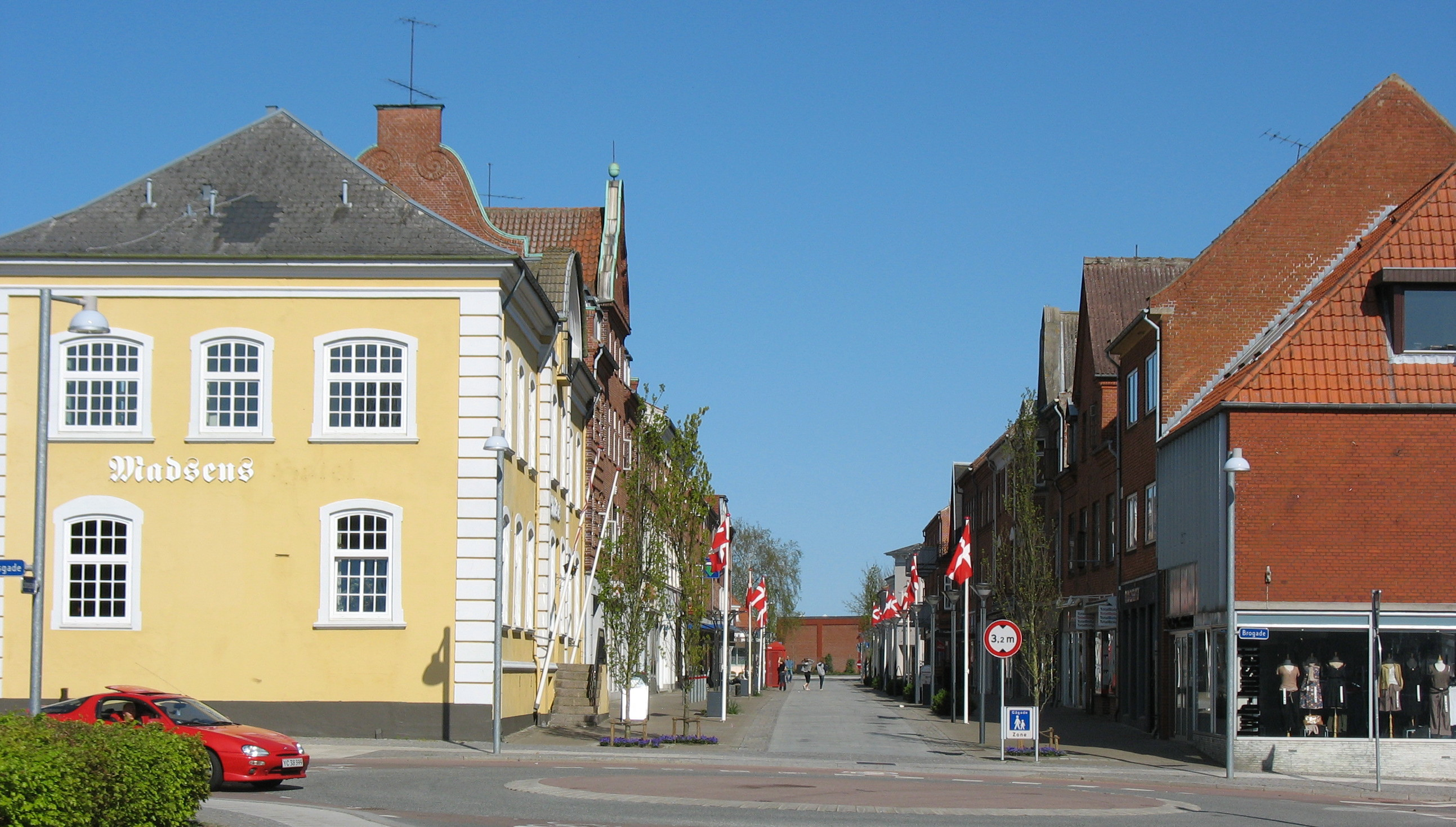
The pedestrian street in Bjerringbro

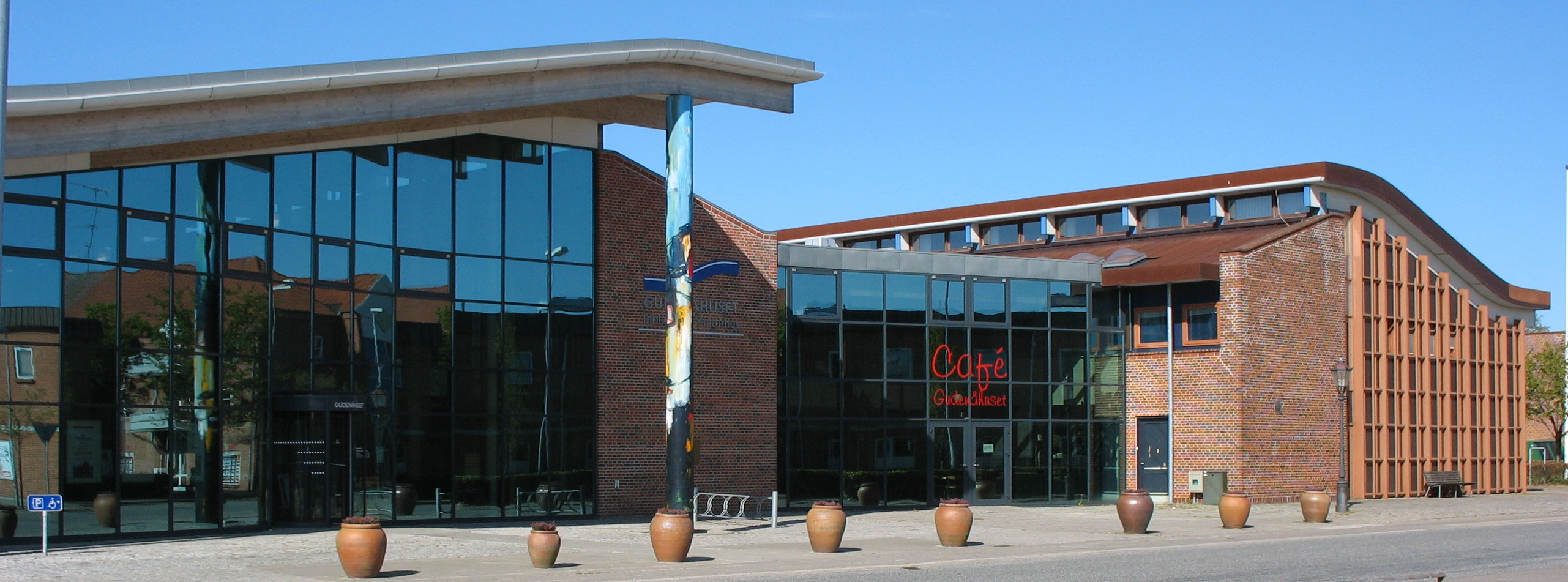
Gudenåhuset, a cultural center in Bjerringbro

== Notable residents ==
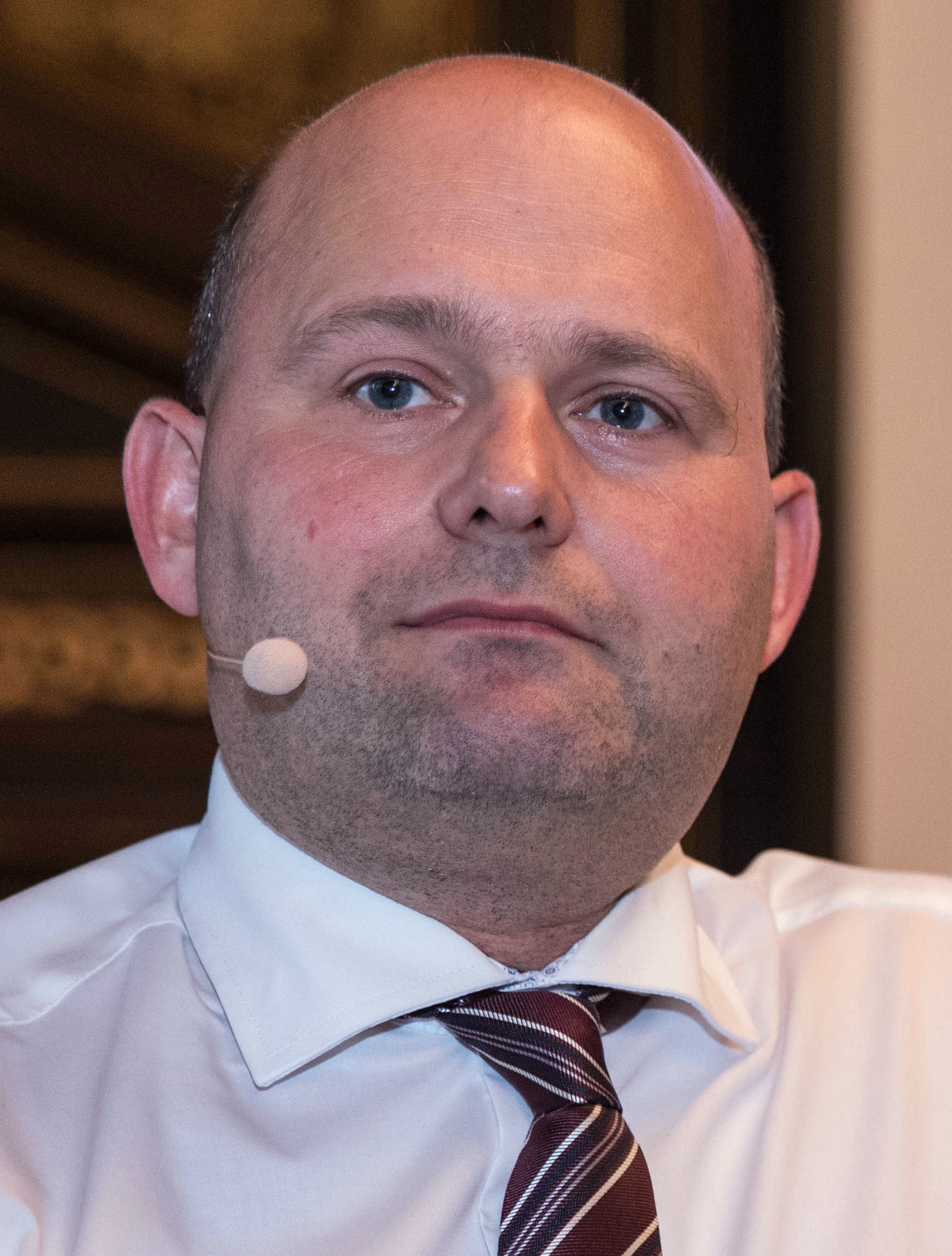
Søren Pape Poulsen, 2017

- Marie Hjelmer (1869 Bjerring – 1937) a Danish women's rights activist and politician.
- Charles Buchwald (1880 in Bjerringbro – 1951) an amateur footballer who played seven games for Denmark and won two team silver medals, at the 1908 and 1912 Summer Olympics
- Søren Pape Poulsen (1971 in Bjerringbro – 2024) politician, former Justice Minister and Mayor of Viborg Municipality 2010 – 2014
- Henrik Baltzersen (born 1984 in Bjerringbro) a Danish amateur BMX cyclist, competed at the 2008 Summer Olympics
- Nikolaj Øris Nielsen (born 1986 in Bjerringbro) a handballer for Bjerringbro-Silkeborg, with 57 caps with for Denmark
- Mads Øris Nielsen (born 1981 in Bjerringbro) a handballer for Bjerringbro-Silkeborg, with 27 caps with for Denmark
- Rasmus Lauge Schmidt (born 1991 in Bjerringbro) a handball player, 180 caps with Denmark
