= Morsø Sparekasse Arena =

Danish indoor sports arena

Coordinates: 56°46′54″N 8°50′13″E

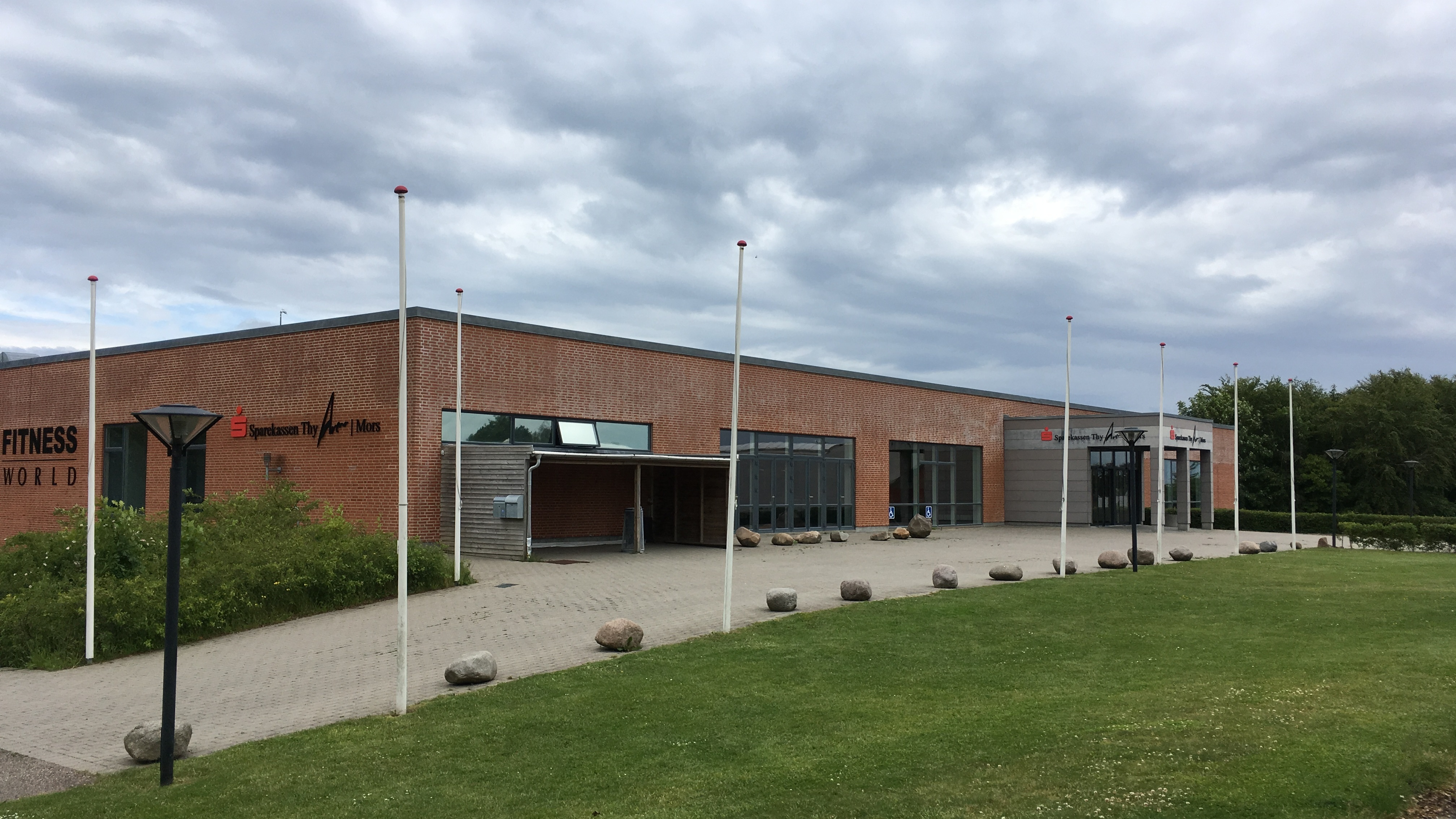
Sparekassen Thy Arena Mors set fra hovedindgangen til foyeen.

Sparekassen Thy Arena Mors is an indoor sports arena in Nykøbing Mors, Denmark primarily used for handball. The arena was built in 2008, and is one of the homes to Danish Handball League side Mors-Thy Håndbold, together with Thyhallen.

The hall is decorated by Danish artist Ingrid Kæseler and Danish furniture designer Niels Hvass.

== Names ==
The arena has had several names, due to sponsor ship reasons.

- 2008-2010: Morsø Sparekasse Arena
- 2010-2011: Fjordbank Arena
- 2011-2017: Jyske Bank Mors Arena
- 2017- : Sparekassen Thy Arena Mors
