= Mors-Thy Håndbold =

Danish handball club

- Full name: Mors-Thy Håndbold
- Short name: Mors-Thy
- Founded: 2007; 19 years ago
- Arena: Sparekassen Mors Arena; Thy Hallen
- Capacity: 2,300; 1,284
- President: H.P. Madsen
- Head coach: Toni Johansson
- League: Håndboldligaen
- 2024–25: Håndboldligaen, 4th of 15
- Club colours
Home	Away

Location of Mors-Thy Håndbold

Mors-Thy Håndbold is a handball club, based in Nykøbing Mors and Thisted, Denmark. Currently, Mors-Thy Håndbold competes in the men's Danish Handball League. The home arena of the team is Sparekassen Thy Arena and Thyhallen in Thisted.

It is the only professional sports team on Mors.

They are known for their talent development, and has contributed with several Danish national team players.

== History ==
The newborn club was founded in 2007, when HF Mors and Thisted IK merged their first teams to create the new club. Thisted IK has roots back from 1904. The team played in the Danish Top League already in their first season, as they continued on HF Mors' license, and they had secured promotion from the Danish 1st Division the season prior. HF Mors had played in the top league in the 2005-06 season.

In the first seasons they were among the relegation candidates, but in the 2012-13 season they qualified for the Championship playoff for the first time. Here they managed to reach the semifinals, where they lost to Aalborg Håndbold. They then lost the third-place playoff to Skjern Håndbold, but it was enough to qualify for the EHF Cup, marking their first European qualification. In the 2013-14 EHF Cup they reached the 3rd round, where they were knocked out by Romanian HCM Constanța.

In 2021 they won their first title; the Danish Men's Handball Cup, beating Aalborg Håndbold in the final 32-31.

== Honours ==
- Danish Handball Cup: 1
  - Gold: 2020

== Team ==
=== Staff ===
Staff for the 2026-27 season

Pos.	Name
Head Coach	(Sweden) Toni Johansson
Assistant Coach	(Denmark) Henrik Tilsted
Assistant Coach	(Denmark) Henrik Toft Hansen
Team Leader	(Denmark) Keld Kristensen
Physioterapeut	(Denmark) Maja Rysz Clausen
Physioterapeut	(Denmark) Mikkel Svingel
Physioterapeut	(Denmark) Lars Henrik Therkildsen

=== Current squad ===
Squad for the 2026-27 season

Goalkeeper

- 1 (Denmark) Rasmus Henriksen
- 12 (Denmark) Johannes Dalsgaard
- 20 (Denmark) Oliver Larsen

Wingers
LW

- 6 (Norway) Sebastian Barthold (c)
- 14 (Denmark) Christoffer Brorson Hansen

RW

- 11 (Denmark) Lasse Pedersen
- 66 (Faroe Islands) Magnus Árason

Pivots

- 4 (Denmark) Kasper Lindgren
- 15 (Denmark) Jonas Dehn Nielsen
- 33 (Denmark) Kasper Didriksen

Back players
LB

- 2 (Denmark) Lasse Mathias Pedersen
- 9 (Denmark) Nikolaj Madsen
- 17 (Denmark) Oliver Wosniak
- 36 (Denmark) Silas Overby

CB

- 8 (Denmark) Frederik Kvistgaard Bak
- 18 (Denmark) Anton Houe
- 27 (Denmark) Simon Skovhus

RB

- 5 (Denmark) Mads-Peter Lønborg
- 22 (Denmark) Gustav Sandbæk Sunesen
- 23 (Denmark) Jonathan Mollerup

=== Transfers ===
Transfers for the 2026–27 season

Joining

- (Denmark) Rasmus Henriksen (GK) from (Denmark) TTH Holstebro
- (Norway) Sebastian Barthold (LW) (from (Germany) SC Magdeburg
- (Denmark) Oliver Wosniak (LB) from (Denmark) TMS Ringsted
- (Denmark) Simon Skovhus (CB) on loan from (Denmark) Aalborg Håndbold
- (Denmark) Mads-Peter Lønborg (RB) from (Denmark) Aarhus Håndbold
- (Denmark) Jonathan Mollerup (RB) (from (Denmark) HØJ Elite)
- (Faroe Islands) Magnus Árason (RW) (from (Denmark) GOG Håndbold Youth)

Leaving

- (Denmark) Henrik Toft Hansen (LP) (retires)
- (Denmark) Victor Norlyk (CB) to (France) HBC Nantes
- (Denmark) Nichlas Hald (LB) to (Denmark) Nordsjælland Håndbold
- (Denmark) Magnus Norlyk (LW) to (Denmark) Aalborg Håndbold
- (Denmark) Malthe Rolighed Bull (RW) to (Denmark) Fredericia HK
- (Denmark) Kristoffer Vestergaard (RB) to (Denmark) KIF Kolding
- (Denmark) Rasmus Madsen (RB) to (Denmark) SønderjyskE Herrehåndbold
- (Denmark) Svend Rughave (GK) to (Denmark) Skjern Håndbold

=== Transfer History ===
Transfers for the 2025–26 season

Joining

- (Denmark) Lasse Pedersen (LB) from (Denmark) Lemvig-Thyborøn Håndbold
- (Denmark) Simon Lundorf (GK) (back from loan at (Denmark) Lemvig-Thyborøn Håndbold)

Leaving

- (Denmark) Marcus Midtgaard (LB) to (Denmark) Skjern Håndbold
- (Denmark) Mads Svane Knudsen (CB) to (Denmark) Bjerringbro-Silkeborg Håndbold
- (Denmark) Simon Lundorf (GK) (to (Denmark) Lemvig-Thyborøn Håndbold)

== Kit manufacturers ==
- (Denmark) Hummel

== Fan Culture ==
Their official fanclub is called 'Bette Balken' (eng: Tiny Balcan), supposedly because a journalist should have said at some point that 'Only in eastern Europe could you find so noisy handball fans'.

== Notable former players ==
- (Denmark) Allan Toft Hansen
- (Denmark) Henrik Toft Hansen
- (Denmark) Rene Toft Hansen
- (Denmark) Mads Hoxer Hangaard
- (Denmark) Mads Svane Knudsen
- (Denmark) Frederik Bjerre
- (Denmark) Nicolaj Jørgensen
- (Denmark) Morten Balling
- (Denmark) Peter Balling
- (Denmark) Tobias Ellebæk
- (Denmark) Jesper Meinby
