= Grundfos =

Danish Pump Manufacturer

- Type: Private
- Industry: Mechanical engineering
- Founded: 1945
- Founder: Poul Due Jensen
- Headquarters: Bjerringbro, Denmark
- Number of locations: 60+
- Area served: Worldwide
- Key people: Poul Due Jensen (CEO / Group President)
- Products: Pumps
- Revenue: ▲28.733 billion DKK (2021)
- Total assets: ▲28.687 billion DKK (2021)
- Number of employees: 19,221 (2020)
- Parent: Poul Due Jensen Foundation (86%)
- Website: www.grundfos.com

Grundfos (Danish pronunciation: [ˈkʁɔnfʌs]) is the largest pump manufacturer in the world, based in Denmark, with more than 19,000 employees globally.

The annual production of more than 16 million pump units, circulator pumps (UP), submersible pumps (SP), and centrifugal pumps (CR). Grundfos also produces electric motors for the pumps as well as electric motors for separate merchandising. Grundfos develops and sells electronics for controls for pumps and other systems.

Grundfos at Plumbex India 2026, BIEC

== History ==
Grundfos was established in 1945 in Bjerringbro by the late Poul Due Jensen in the cellar of his home. He gave his company the name of "Bjerringbro Pressestøberi og Maskinfabrik" (Bjerringbro Die-Casting and Machine Factory). In 1953, the company name was changed to "Bjerringbro Pumpefabrik" (Bjerringbro Pump Factory). The icon Archimedes water screw logo was introduced in 1955, and has been used since this time in various forms. In 1967, the company name again changed to "Grundfoss", which originally served as the name of a pump product produced by the company. In 1968 a slight change was made to "Grundfos" by dropping one 's' from the name.

== Ownership ==
The Poul Due Jensen Foundation was established as a self-governing institution in 1975. Today, the foundation owns about 86%, employees about 2%, and the founder's family about 12% of shares in Grundfos Holding A/S. The aim of the foundation is the continued development of the Grundfos Group. The capital and the profits of the foundation are used solely for the aim of the foundation, that, is the profits are to be re-invested in the Grundfos companies. Grundfos Holding A/S is the majority shareholder in all the Grundfos companies. Flemming Konradsen serves as the Foundation's chairman.

== Products and industries ==
- Submersible pumps
- Dosing pumps
- Disinfection systems
- End suction pumps
- Booster pumps
- Booster systems
- Wastewater pumps
- Circulator pumps
- Fire pumps

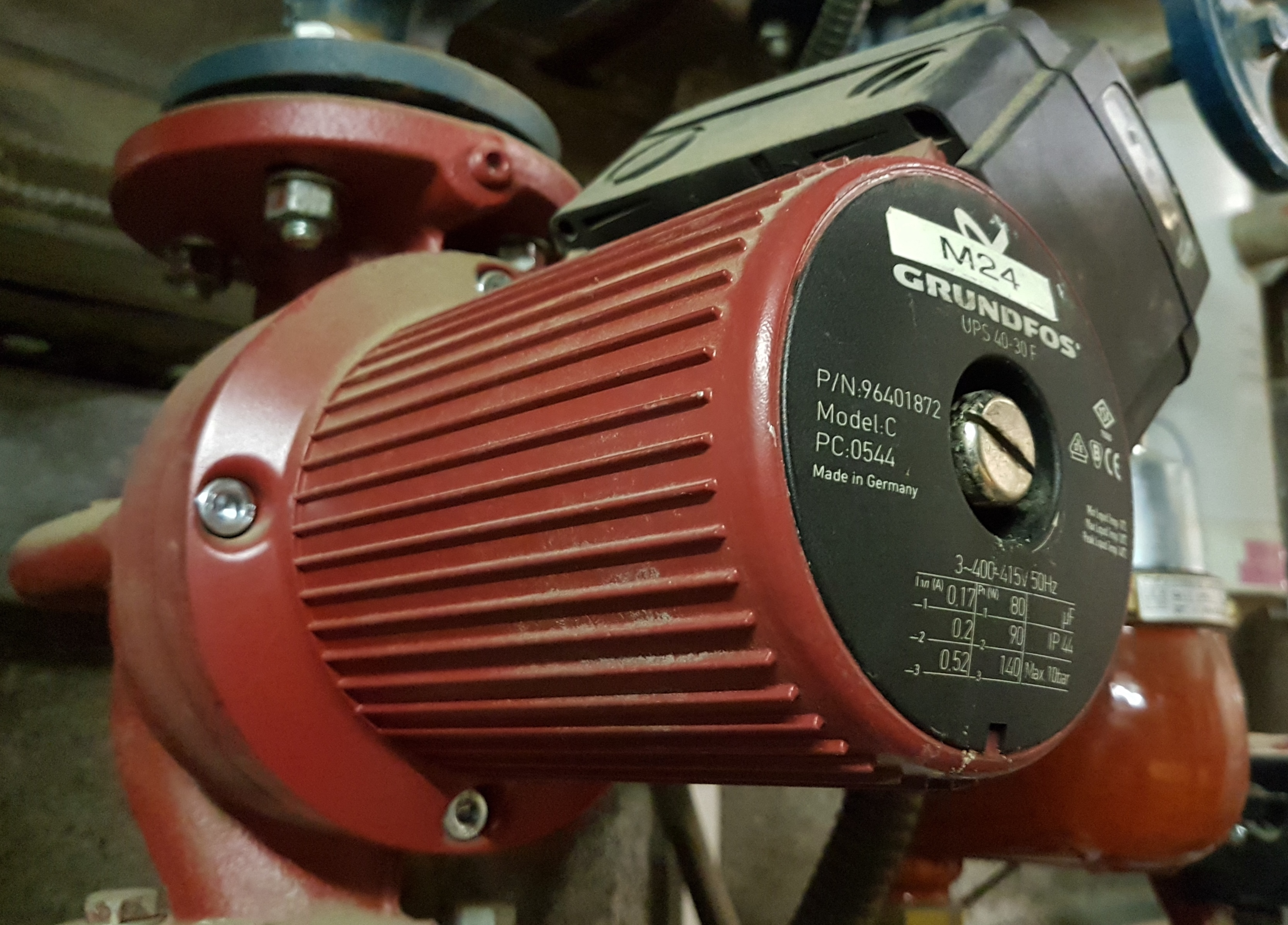
A Grundfos pump in Austria (2021)

Grundfos circulator pumps are used for heating, ventilation and air-conditioning in many applications, including private homes, office buildings, and hotels. In industry, circulator pumps are used in processes, plant maintenance, and as built-in parts in Original Equipment Manufacturer (OEM) products.

In the water supply and wastewater sector, Grundfos offers pumps for irrigation, green houses, and for municipal, private and industrial water supply as well as for sewage applications.

In the fire systems sector, the products are compliant with the popular standards of: FM, NFPA20, LPCB, VdS, EN12845 for fire sprinkler systems, among many other local standards.

== Global expansion ==
The Grundfos Group is represented by companies in all parts of the world. In addition, Grundfos products are merchandised by distributors in more than 50 countries."Grundfos Locations".

== Acquisitions ==
In 2006, Hilge, a producer for pumps in sterile applications, was acquired by the group and sold to GEA in 2015.

Alldos, a German manufacturer of dosing pumps and disinfection equipment, was acquired in early 2005. Alldos employed around 250 people and had a strong presence in Europe, the Middle East, and Australia. Alldos was the only competitor to Grundfos's 'digital dosing' technology. Grundfos dosing products now include Alldos's corporate colour green with Grundfos black.

Grundfos announced that it had purchased US pump manufacturer Peerless Pump Company on December 1, 2007.

In November 2020, Grundfos completed the acquisition of EUROWATER (known as SILHORKO in Denmark). This was followed by an additional acquisition of MECO, which was completed in November 2021, and Metasphere of UK in 2023.

== Innovation ==
In 1985, Grundfos established its own electronics production and in 1991, Grundfos Electronics was inaugurated, including a hybrid factory with clean room production.

In May 1995, the Grundfos Technology Centre was inaugurated. The center is used for research into new materials, development of process technology, and construction of advanced production equipment and machines. In 1993, development, design and product management moved into a newly built "innovation centre".

== Advertising ==
Grundfos is a long-standing Official Partner of the EHF EURO handball Men's and Women's teams.
