= 2024 IHF Men's Olympic Qualification Tournaments =

Handball tournaments

Logo

The 2024 IHF Men's Olympic Qualification Tournaments were held from 14 to 17 March 2024. Four teams took part in each tournament, with the two best-ranked teams qualifying for the 2024 Summer Olympics.

Croatia, Germany, Hungary, Norway, Slovenia and Spain, all six from Europe, qualified for the Olympics.

== Format ==
There were three qualifying tournaments. Only twelve eligible teams through the five events mentioned above qualified for these tournaments:

- The top six teams from the World championship that did not already qualify through their continental championships were eligible to participate in the tournament.
- The highest-ranked teams of each continent in the World championship represented the continent in order to determine the continental ranking. The first-ranked continent (Europe) received two more places for the tournament. The second (Africa), third (Asia), and fourth (Americas)-ranked continents received one place each. The last place belongs to a team from Oceania, if one was ranked between 8 and 12th at the World Championship. As no team from Oceania met this condition, the second-ranked continent received an extra place instead. The teams that already earned their places through their World championship ranking were not considered for receiving places through the continental criterion. In such cases, the access list was rebalanced accordingly.
- The twelve teams were allocated in three pools of four teams according to the table below. The top two teams from each pool qualified for the 2024 Olympic Games.

2024 Olympic Qualification Tournament #1	2024 Olympic Qualification Tournament #2	2024 Olympic Qualification Tournament #3
3rd from World: Spain; 10th from World: Slovenia; 2nd from Asia: Bahrain; 2nd from Americas: Brazil	5th from World: Germany; 9th from World: Croatia; 2nd from Africa: Algeria; 8th from Europe: Austria	6th from World: Norway; 8th from World: Hungary; 7th from Europe: Portugal; 3rd from Africa: Tunisia

The host countries were announced on 2 February 2024.

== Referees ==
The referees were announced on 27 February 2024.

Tournament 1
Algeria	Youcef Belkhiri; Sid Ali Hamidi
Czech Republic	Václav Horáček; Jiří Novotný
France	Julie Bonaventura; Charlotte Bonaventura
Hungary	Ádám Bíró; Olivér Kiss

Tournament 2
Argentina	Sebastián Lenci; Julián López
Denmark	Mads Hansen; Jesper Madsen
Norway	Havard Kleven; Lars Jørum
Spain	Ignacio García; Andreu Marín

Tournament 3
Germany	Robert Schulze; Tobias Tönnies
Montenegro	Ivan Pavićević; Milos Ražnatović
North Macedonia	Gjorgji Nachevski; Slave Nikolov
Slovenia	Bojan Lah; David Sok

== Tournament 1 ==
Tournament 1
Tournament details
- Host country: Spain
- Venue(s): 1 (in 1 host city)
- Dates: 14–17 March
- Teams: 4 (from 3 confederations)

Tournament statistics
- Matches played: 6
- Goals scored: 334 (55.67 per match)
- Attendance: 19,244 (3,207 per match)
- Top scorer(s): (Slovenia) Blaž Janc (16 goals)

The tournament was held in Granollers, Spain.

=== Standings ===
Pos	Team	Pld	W	D	L	GF	GA	GD	Pts	Qualification
1	Spain (H)	3	3	0	0	99	75	+24	6	2024 Summer Olympics
2	Slovenia	3	2	0	1	81	84	−3	4	2024 Summer Olympics
3	Brazil	3	1	0	2	77	79	−2	2	
4	Bahrain	3	0	0	3	77	96	−19	0	

Source: IHF
Rules for classification: 1) Points; 2) Head-to-head points; 3) Head-to-head goal difference; 4) Head-to-head goals scored; 5) Goal difference; 6) Goals scored; 7) Draw.
(H) Hosts

=== Matches ===
All times are local (UTC+1).

14 March 2024; 18:30	Spain	39–27	Bahrain	Palau d'Esports de Granollers, Granollers; Attendance: 2,132; Referees: Bíró, Kiss (HUN)
14 March 2024; 18:30	Fernández Jiménez 8	(18–11)	Eid 7	Palau d'Esports de Granollers, Granollers; Attendance: 2,132; Referees: Bíró, Kiss (HUN)
14 March 2024; 18:30	2× (suspension)	Report	2× (suspension)	Palau d'Esports de Granollers, Granollers; Attendance: 2,132; Referees: Bíró, Kiss (HUN)

14 March 2024; 21:00	Slovenia	27–26	Brazil	Palau d'Esports de Granollers, Granollers; Attendance: 1,968; Referees: Belkhiri, Hamidi (ALG)
14 March 2024; 21:00	Janc 7	(13–12)	Monte da Silva 5	Palau d'Esports de Granollers, Granollers; Attendance: 1,968; Referees: Belkhiri, Hamidi (ALG)
14 March 2024; 21:00	2× (yellow card) 4× (suspension)	Report	2× (suspension)	Palau d'Esports de Granollers, Granollers; Attendance: 1,968; Referees: Belkhiri, Hamidi (ALG)

15 March 2024; 18:30	Bahrain	24–25	Brazil	Palau d'Esports de Granollers, Granollers; Attendance: 1,980; Referees: Bonaventura, Bonaventura (FRA)
15 March 2024; 18:30	Habib 6	(14–11)	Hackbarth 6	Palau d'Esports de Granollers, Granollers; Attendance: 1,980; Referees: Bonaventura, Bonaventura (FRA)
15 March 2024; 18:30	4× (suspension)	Report	1× (suspension)	Palau d'Esports de Granollers, Granollers; Attendance: 1,980; Referees: Bonaventura, Bonaventura (FRA)

15 March 2024; 21:00	Spain	32–22	Slovenia	Palau d'Esports de Granollers, Granollers; Attendance: 5,500; Referees: Horáček, Novotný (CZE)
15 March 2024; 21:00	Garciandia 6	(20–13)	Bombač 5	Palau d'Esports de Granollers, Granollers; Attendance: 5,500; Referees: Horáček, Novotný (CZE)
15 March 2024; 21:00	5× (suspension)	Report	1× (yellow card) 5× (suspension) 1× (red card)	Palau d'Esports de Granollers, Granollers; Attendance: 5,500; Referees: Horáček, Novotný (CZE)

17 March 2024; 15:15	Slovenia	32–26	Bahrain	Palau d'Esports de Granollers, Granollers; Attendance: 1,744; Referees: Bíró, Kiss (HUN)
17 March 2024; 15:15	Vlah 8	(17–12)	Eid 5	Palau d'Esports de Granollers, Granollers; Attendance: 1,744; Referees: Bíró, Kiss (HUN)
17 March 2024; 15:15	1× (yellow card) 4× (suspension)	Report	3× (suspension)	Palau d'Esports de Granollers, Granollers; Attendance: 1,744; Referees: Bíró, Kiss (HUN)

17 March 2024; 17:45	Brazil	26–28	Spain	Palau d'Esports de Granollers, Granollers; Attendance: 5,920; Referees: Bonaventura, Bonaventura (FRA)
17 March 2024; 17:45	Silva 5	(14–14)	Solé 7	Palau d'Esports de Granollers, Granollers; Attendance: 5,920; Referees: Bonaventura, Bonaventura (FRA)
17 March 2024; 17:45	3× (suspension)	Report	4× (suspension)	Palau d'Esports de Granollers, Granollers; Attendance: 5,920; Referees: Bonaventura, Bonaventura (FRA)

== Tournament 2 ==
Tournament 2
Tournament details
- Host country: Germany
- Venue(s): 1 (in 1 host city)
- Dates: 14–17 March
- Teams: 4 (from 2 confederations)

Tournament statistics
- Matches played: 6
- Goals scored: 385 (64.17 per match)
- Attendance: 60,594 (10,099 per match)
- Top scorer(s): (Germany) Renārs Uščins (26 goals)

The tournament was held in Hanover, Germany.

=== Standings ===
Pos	Team	Pld	W	D	L	GF	GA	GD	Pts	Qualification
1	Croatia	3	3	0	0	102	81	+21	6	2024 Summer Olympics
2	Germany (H)	3	2	0	1	105	93	+12	4	2024 Summer Olympics
3	Austria	3	1	0	2	101	95	+6	2	
4	Algeria	3	0	0	3	77	116	−39	0	

Source: IHF
Rules for classification: 1) Points; 2) Head-to-head points; 3) Head-to-head goal difference; 4) Head-to-head goals scored; 5) Goal difference; 6) Goals scored; 7) Draw.
(H) Hosts

=== Matches ===
All times are local (UTC+1).

14 March 2024; 17:45	Germany	41–29	Algeria	ZAG-Arena, Hanover; Attendance: 10,099; Referees: Lenci, López (ARG)
14 March 2024; 17:45	Uščins 10	(16–13)	Abdi 8	ZAG-Arena, Hanover; Attendance: 10,099; Referees: Lenci, López (ARG)
14 March 2024; 17:45	2× (suspension)	Report	1× (yellow card) 3× (suspension)	ZAG-Arena, Hanover; Attendance: 10,099; Referees: Lenci, López (ARG)

14 March 2024; 20:15	Croatia	35–29	Austria	ZAG-Arena, Hanover; Attendance: 10,099; Referees: Kleven, Jørum (NOR)
14 March 2024; 20:15	Martinović 9	(16–16)	Bilyk 8	ZAG-Arena, Hanover; Attendance: 10,099; Referees: Kleven, Jørum (NOR)
14 March 2024; 20:15	1× (suspension) 1× (red card)	Report	3× (suspension)	ZAG-Arena, Hanover; Attendance: 10,099; Referees: Kleven, Jørum (NOR)

16 March 2024; 14:30	Germany	30–33	Croatia	ZAG-Arena, Hanover; Attendance: 10,099; Referees: García, Marín (ESP)
16 March 2024; 14:30	Uščins 8	(10–16)	Martinović 8	ZAG-Arena, Hanover; Attendance: 10,099; Referees: García, Marín (ESP)
16 March 2024; 14:30	1× (yellow card) 3× (suspension) 1× (red card)	Report	2× (yellow card) 4× (suspension)	ZAG-Arena, Hanover; Attendance: 10,099; Referees: García, Marín (ESP)

16 March 2024; 17:30	Algeria	26–41	Austria	ZAG-Arena, Hanover; Attendance: 10,099; Referees: Hansen, Madsen (DEN)
16 March 2024; 17:30	Berkous 9	(13–20)	Frimmel 8	ZAG-Arena, Hanover; Attendance: 10,099; Referees: Hansen, Madsen (DEN)
16 March 2024; 17:30	1× (suspension) 1× (red card)	Report	1× (suspension)	ZAG-Arena, Hanover; Attendance: 10,099; Referees: Hansen, Madsen (DEN)

17 March 2024; 14:10	Austria	31–34	Germany	ZAG-Arena, Hanover; Attendance: 10,099; Referees: Hansen, Madsen (DEN)
17 March 2024; 14:10	Božović 7	(15–18)	Köster, Uščins 8	ZAG-Arena, Hanover; Attendance: 10,099; Referees: Hansen, Madsen (DEN)
17 March 2024; 14:10	3× (suspension)	Report	1× (yellow card) 3× (suspension)	ZAG-Arena, Hanover; Attendance: 10,099; Referees: Hansen, Madsen (DEN)

17 March 2024; 16:45	Croatia	34–22	Algeria	ZAG-Arena, Hanover; Attendance: 10,099; Referees: Lenci, López (ARG)
17 March 2024; 16:45	Glavaš 9	(15–11)	Abdi 8	ZAG-Arena, Hanover; Attendance: 10,099; Referees: Lenci, López (ARG)
17 March 2024; 16:45	1× (suspension) 1× (red card)	Report	3× (suspension)	ZAG-Arena, Hanover; Attendance: 10,099; Referees: Lenci, López (ARG)

== Tournament 3 ==
Tournament 3
Tournament details
- Host country: Hungary
- Venue(s): 1 (in 1 host city)
- Dates: 14–17 March
- Teams: 4 (from 2 confederations)

Tournament statistics
- Matches played: 6
- Goals scored: 360 (60 per match)
- Attendance: 26,115 (4,353 per match)
- Top scorer(s): (Portugal) Luís Frade (19 goals)

The tournament was held in Tatabánya, Hungary.

=== Standings ===
Pos	Team	Pld	W	D	L	GF	GA	GD	Pts	Qualification
1	Norway	3	3	0	0	102	78	+24	6	2024 Summer Olympics
2	Hungary (H)	3	2	0	1	88	80	+8	4	2024 Summer Olympics
3	Portugal	3	1	0	2	93	91	+2	2	
4	Tunisia	3	0	0	3	77	111	−34	0	

Source: IHF
Rules for classification: 1) Points; 2) Head-to-head points; 3) Head-to-head goal difference; 4) Head-to-head goals scored; 5) Goal difference; 6) Goals scored; 7) Draw.
(H) Hosts

=== Matches ===
All times are local (UTC+1).

14 March 2024; 18:30	Norway	32–29	Portugal	Tatabányai Multifunkcionális Sportcsarnok, Tatabánya; Attendance: 2,640; Referees: Lah, Sok (SLO)
14 March 2024; 18:30	Lyse, Sagosen 6	(18–13)	Frade 8	Tatabányai Multifunkcionális Sportcsarnok, Tatabánya; Attendance: 2,640; Referees: Lah, Sok (SLO)
14 March 2024; 18:30	6× (suspension)	Report	5× (suspension)	Tatabányai Multifunkcionális Sportcsarnok, Tatabánya; Attendance: 2,640; Referees: Lah, Sok (SLO)

14 March 2024; 21:00	Hungary	33–24	Tunisia	Tatabányai Multifunkcionális Sportcsarnok, Tatabánya; Attendance: 4,975; Referees: Pavićević, Ražnatović (MNE)
14 March 2024; 21:00	Lékai 6	(17–10)	three players 4	Tatabányai Multifunkcionális Sportcsarnok, Tatabánya; Attendance: 4,975; Referees: Pavićević, Ražnatović (MNE)
14 March 2024; 21:00	5× (suspension)	Report	1× (yellow card) 6× (suspension)	Tatabányai Multifunkcionális Sportcsarnok, Tatabánya; Attendance: 4,975; Referees: Pavićević, Ražnatović (MNE)

16 March 2024; 17:00	Portugal	37–29	Tunisia	Tatabányai Multifunkcionális Sportcsarnok, Tatabánya; Attendance: 3,000; Referees: Schulze, Tönnies (GER)
16 March 2024; 17:00	Frade 6	(18–12)	three players 4	Tatabányai Multifunkcionális Sportcsarnok, Tatabánya; Attendance: 3,000; Referees: Schulze, Tönnies (GER)
16 March 2024; 17:00	2× (suspension)	Report	1× (yellow card) 1× (suspension)	Tatabányai Multifunkcionális Sportcsarnok, Tatabánya; Attendance: 3,000; Referees: Schulze, Tönnies (GER)

16 March 2024; 19:30	Norway	29–25	Hungary	Tatabányai Multifunkcionális Sportcsarnok, Tatabánya; Attendance: 6,000; Referees: Nachevski, Nikolov (MKD)
16 March 2024; 19:30	Grøndahl 8	(16–13)	four players 3	Tatabányai Multifunkcionális Sportcsarnok, Tatabánya; Attendance: 6,000; Referees: Nachevski, Nikolov (MKD)
16 March 2024; 19:30	1× (yellow card) 5× (suspension) 1× (red card)	Report	4× (suspension)	Tatabányai Multifunkcionális Sportcsarnok, Tatabánya; Attendance: 6,000; Referees: Nachevski, Nikolov (MKD)

17 March 2024; 18:30	Tunisia	24–41	Norway	Tatabányai Multifunkcionális Sportcsarnok, Tatabánya; Attendance: 3,500; Referees: Pavićević, Ražnatović (MNE)
17 March 2024; 18:30	Rzig 7	(12–20)	Barthold 11	Tatabányai Multifunkcionális Sportcsarnok, Tatabánya; Attendance: 3,500; Referees: Pavićević, Ražnatović (MNE)
17 March 2024; 18:30	2× (suspension)	Report	3× (suspension)	Tatabányai Multifunkcionális Sportcsarnok, Tatabánya; Attendance: 3,500; Referees: Pavićević, Ražnatović (MNE)

17 March 2024; 21:00	Hungary	30–27	Portugal	Tatabányai Multifunkcionális Sportcsarnok, Tatabánya; Attendance: 6,000; Referees: Schulze, Tönnies (GER)
17 March 2024; 21:00	Imre 9	(16–16)	Portela 6	Tatabányai Multifunkcionális Sportcsarnok, Tatabánya; Attendance: 6,000; Referees: Schulze, Tönnies (GER)
17 March 2024; 21:00	3× (suspension) 1× (red card)	Report	1× (yellow card) 4× (suspension)	Tatabányai Multifunkcionális Sportcsarnok, Tatabánya; Attendance: 6,000; Referees: Schulze, Tönnies (GER)

== See also ==
- 2024 IHF Women's Olympic Qualification Tournaments
