= Simon Hald =

Danish handball player (born 1994)

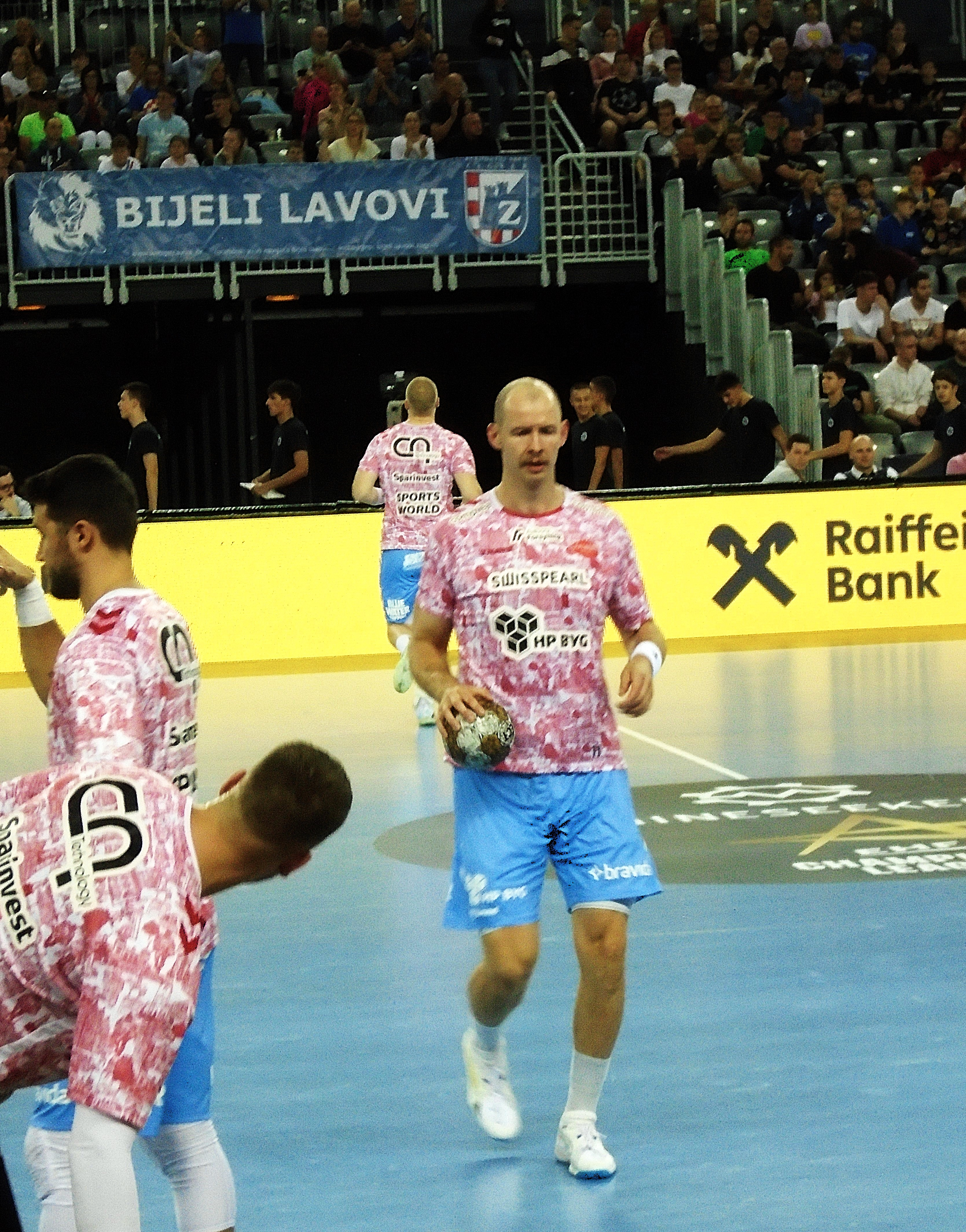
- Hald during the match RK Zagreb - Aalborg Håndbold (31:23) in Zagreb Arena, Croatia, on 18th September 2024

Personal information
- Full name: Simon Hald Jensen
- Nationality: Danish
- Born: 28 September 1994 (age 32) Aalborg, Denmark
- Height: 2.03 m (6 ft 8 in)

Sport
- Sport: Handball
- Position: Pivot
- Current club: Aalborg Håndbold
- Number: 11

Youth career
- Years: Team
- –: Nøvling IF
- –: Team Vesthimmerland

Senior clubs
- Years: Team
- 2013–2018: Aalborg Håndbold
- 2018–2023: SG Flensburg-Handewitt
- 2023–: Aalborg Håndbold
National team
Years	Team	Apps	(Gls)
2015–	Denmark	91	(97)
Medal record
Olympic Games
Gold medal – first place	2024 Paris	Team
World Championship
Gold medal – first place	2019 Germany/Denmark
Gold medal – first place	2021 Egypt
Gold medal – first place	2023 Poland/Sweden
Gold medal – first place	2025 Croatia/Denmark/Norway
European Championship
Gold medal – first place	2026 Denmark/Norway/Sweden
Silver medal – second place	2024 Germany
Bronze medal – third place	2022 Hungary/Slovakia
Youth World Championship
Gold medal – first place	2013 Hungary
- Updated on 29 January 2024

Simon Hald Jensen (born 29 September 1994) is a Danish handball player for Aalborg Håndbold and the Danish national team.

== Club career ==
Hald started playing top handball at the Danish club Aalborg Håndbold, where he was a part of the league team from 2013 to 2018. Here he won two Danish Championships, in 2013 and 2017.

In 2018 she switched to the German top club Flensburg-Handewitt on a three-year deal, where he won the German Bundesliga in 2019.

In 2023 he re-signed with his old club Aalborg Håndbold. In his first season back in Aalborg, he won the Danish Championship again. In 2025 he won the Danish Cup with the club. Later the same season he won the Danish championship.

== National team career ==
Playing for the Danish U-19 National Team, he was part of the team that won the U-19 World Cup in 2013 in Hungary, where he won the Player of the Tournament award.

He made his debut for the senior national team in 2015 in an away match against Poland, and in 2019 he made his tournament debut at the 2019 World Men's Handball Championship on home soil, where he won the World Cup, Denmarks first World Cup Title. He was also on the Danish team that won gold medals at the 2021 World Men's Handball Championship in Egypt.

In 2024 he was part of the Danish team at the 2024 Olympics, but was injured in the second match against Egypt, and was forced to leave the tournament. Denmark won Olympic Gold at that tournament.

At the 2026 European Men's Handball Championship he won gold medals, meaning that Denmark held both the World, European and Olympic titles at the same time, as only the second team ever after France's 'Les Experts'. He was however injured during the semi-final against Iceland, which sparked an injury crisis for Denmark, as both Lukas Jørgensen and Emil Bergholt had also been injured, leaving Magnus Saugstrup as the only pivot for the final.

== Individual awards ==
- Most Valuable Player (MVP) of the Youth World Championship: 2013
