= Emil Bergholt =

Danish handball player (born 1997)

Personal information
- Full name: Emil Siersbæk Bergholt
- Nationality: Danish
- Born: 25 August 1997 (age 29) Skjern, Denmark
- Height: 1.90 m (6 ft 3 in)

Sport
- Sport: Handball
- Position: Pivot
- Current club: Skjern Håndbold
- Number: 14

Senior clubs
- Years: Team
- 2014–2017: Skjern Håndbold
- 2017–2019: TM Tønder Håndbold
- 2019–2021: Mors-Thy Håndbold
- 2021–2026: Skjern Håndbold
- 2026–: SG Flensburg-Handewitt
National team
Years	Team	Apps	(Gls)
2023–	Denmark	32	(15)
Medal record
World Championship
Gold medal – first place	2025 Croatia/Denmark/Norway
European Championship
Gold medal – first place	2026 Denmark/Norway/Sweden
- Updated on 2 February 2026

Emil Siersbæk Bergholt (born 25 August 1997) is a Danish handball player for Skjern Håndbold and the Danish national team. He is the captain at his club, Skjern Håndbold.

Bergholt comes from a handball family with deep ties to Skjern Håndbold. His father Henrik Bergholt was also playing for the same club, reaching 354 matches for the club. His brother Viktor Bergholt is also a handball player at Skjern Håndbold.

== Career ==
Bergholt played as a junior for Skjern Håndbold, where he also started his senior career in 2014. With Skjern he won the Danish Cup twice. In 2017 he left for the second-tier club TM Tønder, where he ended up staying for two seasons. He shifted to Mors-Thy Håndbold in 2019, and won the Danish Cup again in 2020. Since 2021 he's back in Skjern Håndbold.

In March 2025 it was announced that from the 2026–27 season he will play for German SG Flensburg-Handewitt. Flensburg-Handewitt activated a 135.000 euro release clause to sign him.

=== National team ===
He made his debut for the Danish national team on 9 March 2023 against Germany, scoring one goal. He was however injured less than a month later, which ended his season.

His first major international tournament was the 2025 World Men's Handball Championship, where Denmark won the tournament. Being a surprising callup from Skjern Håndbold he started the tournament as a backup, but would become a regular starter as the tournament progressed.

He also represented Denmark at the 2026 European Men's Handball Championship. During a main round game against Norway, he got a foot injury, which kept him out for the rest of the tournament. This sparked an injury crisis for Denmark, as both Lukas Jørgensen and Simon Hald were also injured during the tournament, leaving Magnus Saugstrup as the only pivot in the final. Denmark would despite that go on to win the title, meaning that Denmark held both the World, European and Olympic titles at the same time, as only the second team ever after France's 'Les Experts'.

== Achievements ==
- Danish Handball Cup:
  - Winner: 2014, 2016, 2020
