= Magnus Landin Jacobsen =

Danish handball player (born 1995)

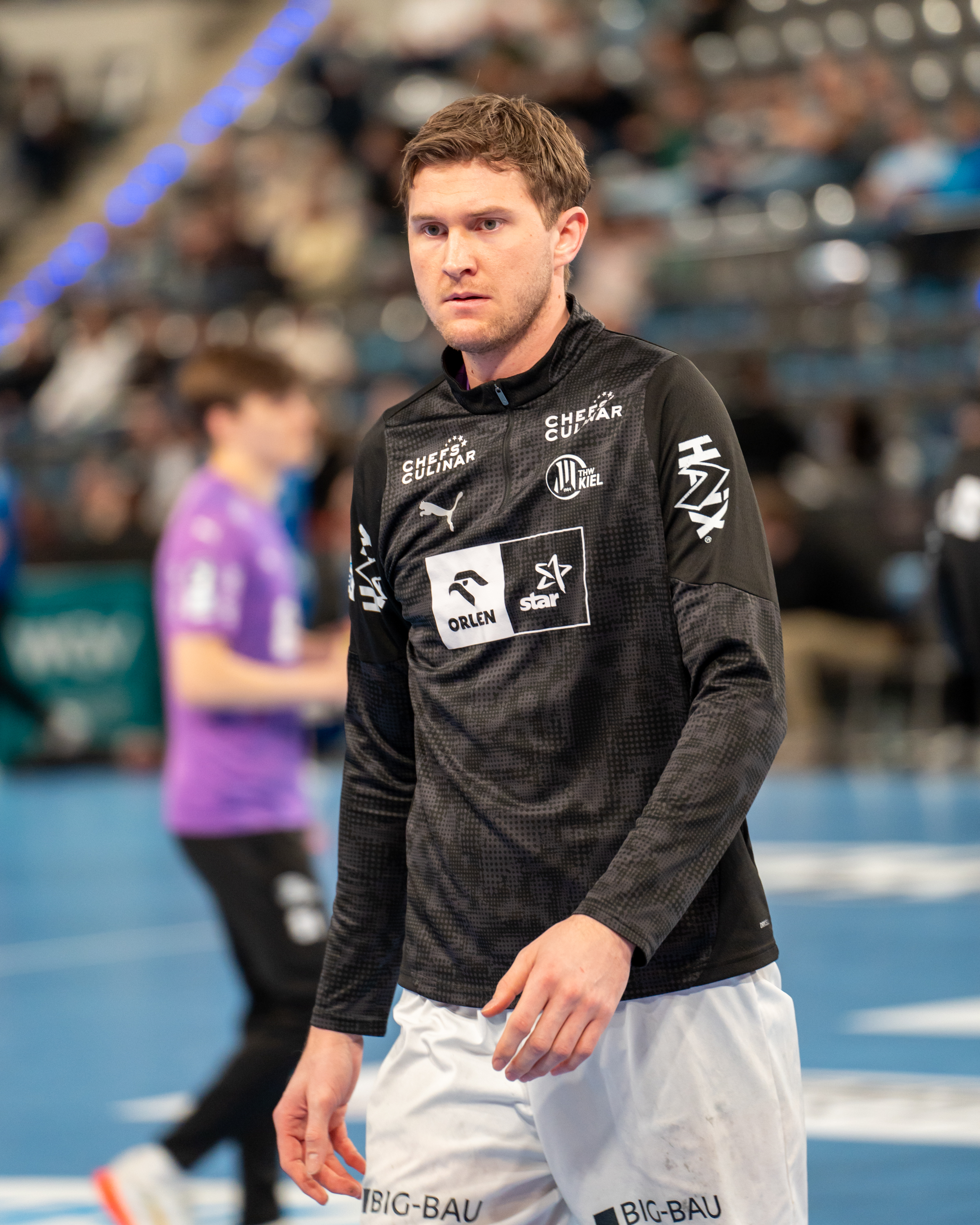
- Landin with THW Kiel in 2026

Personal information
- Nationality: Danish
- Born: 20 August 1995 (age 31) Søborg, Denmark
- Height: 1.97 m (6 ft 6 in)

Sport
- Sport: Handball
- Position: Left wing
- Current club: Aalborg Håndbold
- Number: 19

Senior clubs
- Years: Team
- –2013: HIK
- 2013–2014: Nordsjælland Håndbold
- 2014–2018: KIF Kolding København
- 2018–2026: THW Kiel
- 2026–: Aalborg Håndbold
National team
Years	Team	Apps	(Gls)
2015–	Denmark	172	(311)
Medal record
Olympic Games
Gold medal – first place	2024 Paris	Team
Silver medal – second place	2020 Tokyo	Team
World Championship
Gold medal – first place	2019 Germany/Denmark
Gold medal – first place	2021 Egypt
Gold medal – first place	2023 Poland/Sweden
Gold medal – first place	2025 Croatia/Denmark/Norway
European Championship
Gold medal – first place	2026 Denmark/Norway/Sweden
Silver medal – second place	2024 Germany
Bronze medal – third place	2022 Hungary/Slovakia
Junior World Championship
Silver medal – second place	2015 Brazil
Youth World Championship
Gold medal – first place	2013 Hungary
- Updated on 1 February 2026

Magnus Landin Jacobsen (born 20 August 1995) is a Danish professional handballer for Aalborg Håndbold and the Danish national team.

== Personal life ==
He is the younger brother of fellow Danish national team player Niklas Landin Jacobsen.

== Playing career ==
Landin won the 2013 Men's Youth World Handball Championship along the Danish youth national team, defeating Croatia 32–26 in OT.

In 2013 Landin signed with Nordsjælland Håndbold transferring from HIK.

In 2014 it was announced that Landin had signed a two-year contract with KIF Kolding København starting at the begin of the 2014–15 season. He won his first Danish championship the first year at KIF Kolding Copenhagen.

On 17 November 2017, KIF Kolding København announced that Landin would leave the club at the end of the 2017–18 season. Later same day, it was announced that he would join THW Kiel on a two-year contract starting at the begin of the 2018–19 season. His brother, Niklas Landin, already played at the club.

Landin made his debut for the Danish national team on 10 June 2015 in a match against Lithuania. He won gold medals at three world cups in a row, at the 2019, 2021 and 2023 World Championships. He also won gold at the 2024 Olympics.

At the 2026 European Men's Handball Championship he won gold medals, meaning that Denmark held both the World, European and Olympic titles at the same time, as only the second team ever after France's 'Les Experts'.

From the 2026–27 season, he will join Aalborg Håndbold, once again becoming a teammate with his brother.

== Honours ==
- EHF Champions League:
  - Gold: 2020
- EHF Cup:
  - Gold: 2019
- German Championship
  - Gold: 2020, 2021, 2023
- DHB-Pokal
  - Gold: 2019, 2022, 2025
- DHB-Supercup
  - Gold: 2020, 2021, 2022, 2023
- Danish Championship:
  - Gold: 2015
