= Renārs Uščins =

German handball player (born 2002)

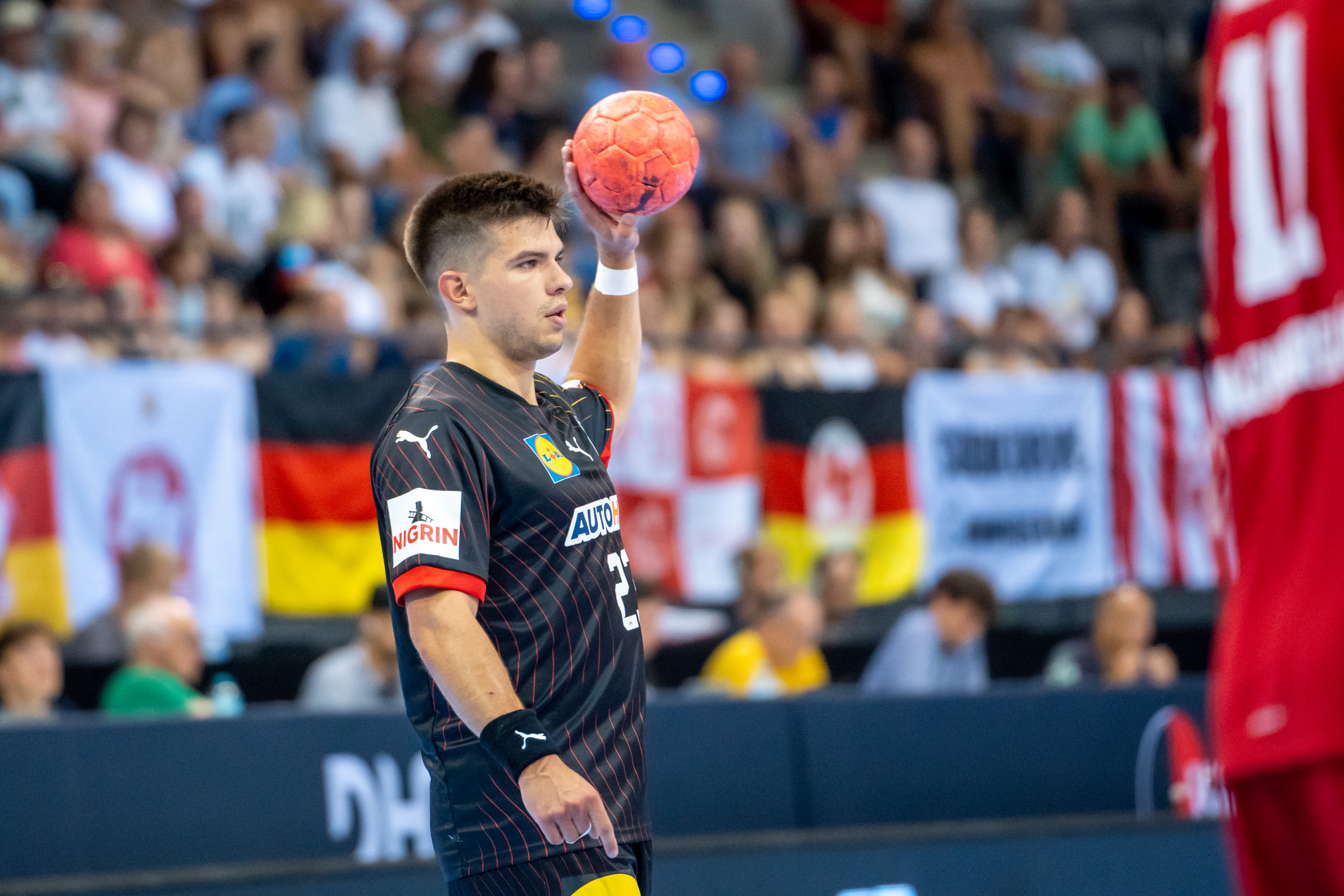
- Uščins with Germany in 2024

Personal information
- Nationality: Latvian, German
- Born: 29 April 2002 (age 24) Cēsis, Latvia
- Height: 1.89 m (6 ft 2 in)

Sport
- Sport: Handball
- Position: Right back
- Current club: TSV Hannover-Burgdorf
- Number: 10

Youth career
- Years: Team
- 2011–2015: SG Kühnau
- 2015–2021: SC Magdeburg

Senior clubs
- Years: Team
- 2020–2021: SC Magdeburg II
- 2021–2022: SC Magdeburg
- 2021: → Bergischer HC (loan)
- 2022–: TSV Hannover-Burgdorf
- 2022–2023: TSV Burgdorf II
National team
Years	Team	Apps	(Gls)
2023–	Germany	59	(242)
Medal record
Olympic Games
Silver medal – second place	2024 Paris	Team
European Championship
Silver medal – second place	2026 Denmark/Norway/Sweden
- Updated on 8 November 2026

Renārs "Recke" Uščins (born 29 April 2002) is a Latvian-born German handball player who plays for TSV Hannover-Burgdorf and the Germany national team.

== Club career ==
Uščins started playing handball at SG Kühnau in Dessau as his father played for 2. Bundesliga team Dessau-Roßlauer HV. When he was 13 years old he joined SC Magdeburg, where he played for the Magdeburg 2nd team in the 3. Liga.

In February 2021 he joined Bergischer HC on loan.

In the 2021–22 season he was a part of the Magdeburg first team, where he won the German Championship.

For the 2022–23 season he joined TSV Hannover-Burgdorf on a permanent deal. In 2025 he was named the best young player in the world by IHF.

== International career ==
Uščins was part of the Germany U19 national team which won the 2021 European Men's U-19 Handball Championship. He was voted into the tournament's All-Star-Team.

He captained the Germany U21 at the 2023 Men's Junior World Handball Championship in summer 2023, which Germany won.

Uščins played for the Germany senior national team at the 2024 European Men's Handball Championship. He was voted Player of the Match in the semifinals, where Germany lost 29–26 to Denmark.

At the 2026 European Men's Handball Championship he won silver medals, losing to Denmark in the final. In the final he scored only 2 goals out of 7 shots.

== Personal life ==
His father is former Latvia national team player Armands Uščins.

== Honours ==
Germany U21

- Men's Junior World Handball Championship: 2023

Germany U19

- IHF Men's Junior World Championship: 2021

Individual

- All-Star right back of the Olympic Games: 2024
- IHF Best young men's player in the world: 2025
