= Handball at the 2024 Summer Olympics – Men's tournament =

Men's handball at the XXXIII Olympiad

Tournament details
- Host country: France
- Venue(s): South Paris Arena 6 Pierre Mauroy Stadium (in 2 host cities)
- Dates: 27 July – 11 August
- Teams: 12 (from 5 confederations)

Final positions
- Champions: Denmark (2nd title)
- Runners-up: Germany
- Third place: Spain
- Fourth place: Slovenia

Tournament statistics
- Matches played: 38
- Goals scored: 2,221 (58.45 per match)
- Attendance: 367,592 (9,673 per match)
- Top scorer(s): (Denmark) Mathias Gidsel (62 goals)

Awards
- Best player: (Denmark) Mathias Gidsel

The men's handball tournament at the 2024 Summer Olympics was the 15th edition of the handball event for men at the Summer Olympic Games. It was held from 27 July to 11 August 2024. The preliminary round games were played at the South Paris Arena 6 in Paris and the final games at the Pierre Mauroy Stadium in Lille, France.

Denmark won their second title with a win over Germany. It was Denmark's third final in a row and the biggest win in an olympic final. Spain captured the bronze medal after a victory against Slovenia.

== Schedule ==
The schedule of the tournament was as follows.

Legend
G	Group stage	¼	Quarter-finals	½	Semi-finals	B	Bronze medal match	F	Gold medal match

Sat 27	Sun 28	Mon 29	Tue 30	Wed 31	Thu 1	Fri 2	Sat 3	Sun 4	Mon 5	Tue 6	Wed 7	Thu 8	Fri 9	Sat 10	Sun 11	
G		G		G		G		G			¼		½		B	F

== Qualification ==
Qualification	Date	Host	Berths	Qualified team
Host nation	—	—	1	France
2023 World Championship	11–29 January 2023	Poland; Sweden	1	Denmark
2023 Asian Qualification Tournament	18–28 October 2023	(Qatar) Doha	1	Japan
2023 Pan American Games	30 October – 4 November 2023	(Chile) Viña del Mar	1	Argentina
2024 European Championship	10–28 January 2024	Germany	1	Sweden
2024 African Championship	17–27 January 2024	(Egypt) Cairo	1	Egypt
2024 IHF Men's Olympic Qualification Tournaments	14–17 March 2024	(Spain) Granollers	2	Spain; Slovenia
2024 IHF Men's Olympic Qualification Tournaments	14–17 March 2024	(Germany) Hanover	2	Croatia; Germany
2024 IHF Men's Olympic Qualification Tournaments	14–17 March 2024	(Hungary) Tatabánya	2	Norway; Hungary
Total			12	

== Draw ==
The draw was held on 16 April 2024.

=== Seeding ===
The seeding was revealed on 17 March 2024.

Pot 1	Pot 2	Pot 3	Pot 4	Pot 5	Pot 6
Denmark; Spain	Croatia; Norway	Hungary; Germany	Slovenia; France	Sweden; Egypt	Argentina; Japan

== Referees ==
The referee pairs were announced on 26 April 2024.

Referees
Algeria	Youcef Belkhiri; Sid Ali Hamidi
Argentina	Mariana García; María Paolantoni
Bosnia and Herzegovina	Amar Konjičanin; Dino Konjičanin
Czech Republic	Václav Horáček; Jiří Novotný
Denmark	Mads Hansen; Jesper Madsen
France	Charlotte Bonaventura; Julie Bonaventura
Germany	Robert Schulze; Tobias Tönnies
Germany	Tanja Kuttler; Maike Merz

Referees
Hungary	Ádám Bíró; Olivér Kiss
North Macedonia	Gjorgji Nachevski; Slave Nikolov
Montenegro	Ivan Pavićević; Miloš Ražnatović
Norway	Lars Jørum; Håvard Kleven
Slovenia	Bojan Lah; David Sok
Spain	Ignacio García; Andreu Marín
Sweden	Mirza Kurtagic; Mattias Wetterwik
Switzerland	Arthur Brunner; Morad Salah

== Preliminary round ==
All times are local (UTC+2).

=== Group A ===
Pos	Team	Pld	W	D	L	GF	GA	GD	Pts	Qualification
1	Germany	5	4	0	1	162	144	+18	8	Quarterfinals
2	Slovenia	5	3	0	2	140	142	−2	6 (Note: Slovenia 2 Pts, +2 GD; Spain 2 Pts, 0 GD; Sweden 2 Pts, −2 GD.)	Quarterfinals
3	Spain	5	3	0	2	151	148	+3	6	Quarterfinals
4	Sweden	5	3	0	2	158	139	+19	6	Quarterfinals
5	Croatia	5	2	0	3	148	156	−8	4	
6	Japan	5	0	0	5	143	173	−30	0	

Source: Olympics Paris 2024 rankings
Rules for classification: 1) Points; 2) Head-to-head points; 3) Head-to-head goal difference; 4) Head-to-head goals scored; 5) Goal difference; 6) Goals scored; 7) Draw.
Notes:

27 July 2024; 09:00	Spain	25–22	Slovenia	Paris Expo Porte de Versailles, Paris; Attendance: 5,776; Referees: C. Bonaventura, J. Bonaventura (FRA)
27 July 2024; 09:00	Gómez 7	(8–11)	Bombač 5	Paris Expo Porte de Versailles, Paris; Attendance: 5,776; Referees: C. Bonaventura, J. Bonaventura (FRA)
27 July 2024; 09:00	3× (suspension)	Report	5× (suspension)	Paris Expo Porte de Versailles, Paris; Attendance: 5,776; Referees: C. Bonaventura, J. Bonaventura (FRA)

27 July 2024; 14:00	Croatia	30–29	Japan	Paris Expo Porte de Versailles, Paris; Attendance: 5,749; Referees: Jørum, Kleven (NOR)
27 July 2024; 14:00	Šoštarič 6	(13–18)	Yasuhira 10	Paris Expo Porte de Versailles, Paris; Attendance: 5,749; Referees: Jørum, Kleven (NOR)
27 July 2024; 14:00	3× (suspension)	Report	4× (suspension)	Paris Expo Porte de Versailles, Paris; Attendance: 5,749; Referees: Jørum, Kleven (NOR)

27 July 2024; 19:00	Germany	30–27	Sweden	Paris Expo Porte de Versailles, Paris; Attendance: 5,739; Referees: Hansen, Madsen (DEN)
27 July 2024; 19:00	Uščins 8	(12–11)	Wanne 8	Paris Expo Porte de Versailles, Paris; Attendance: 5,739; Referees: Hansen, Madsen (DEN)
27 July 2024; 19:00	1× (suspension) 1× (red card)	Report	2× (suspension)	Paris Expo Porte de Versailles, Paris; Attendance: 5,739; Referees: Hansen, Madsen (DEN)

29 July 2024; 09:00	Japan	26–37	Germany	Paris Expo Porte de Versailles, Paris; Attendance: 5,788; Referees: Bíró, Kiss (HUN)
29 July 2024; 09:00	Fujisaka 6	(10–21)	Uščins 7	Paris Expo Porte de Versailles, Paris; Attendance: 5,788; Referees: Bíró, Kiss (HUN)
29 July 2024; 09:00	3× (suspension)	Report	1× (suspension)	Paris Expo Porte de Versailles, Paris; Attendance: 5,788; Referees: Bíró, Kiss (HUN)

29 July 2024; 11:00	Slovenia	31–29	Croatia	Paris Expo Porte de Versailles, Paris; Attendance: 5,788; Referees: Nachevski, Nikolov (MKD)
29 July 2024; 11:00	Janc, Vlah 8	(13–13)	three players 5	Paris Expo Porte de Versailles, Paris; Attendance: 5,788; Referees: Nachevski, Nikolov (MKD)
29 July 2024; 11:00	1× (yellow card) 5× (suspension)	Report	1× (yellow card) 8× (suspension) 1× (red card)	Paris Expo Porte de Versailles, Paris; Attendance: 5,788; Referees: Nachevski, Nikolov (MKD)

29 July 2024; 16:00	Sweden	29–26	Spain	Paris Expo Porte de Versailles, Paris; Attendance: 5,764; Referees: Horáček, Novotný (CZE)
29 July 2024; 16:00	three players 5	(11–11)	Fernández 7	Paris Expo Porte de Versailles, Paris; Attendance: 5,764; Referees: Horáček, Novotný (CZE)
29 July 2024; 16:00	1× (yellow card) 4× (suspension)	Report	1× (yellow card) 5× (suspension)	Paris Expo Porte de Versailles, Paris; Attendance: 5,764; Referees: Horáček, Novotný (CZE)

31 July 2024; 11:00	Croatia	31–26	Germany	Paris Expo Porte de Versailles, Paris; Attendance: 5,774; Referees: Horáček, Novotný (CZE)
31 July 2024; 11:00	Martinović 9	(15–13)	Golla 8	Paris Expo Porte de Versailles, Paris; Attendance: 5,774; Referees: Horáček, Novotný (CZE)
31 July 2024; 11:00	1× (yellow card) 5× (suspension) 1× (red card)	Report		Paris Expo Porte de Versailles, Paris; Attendance: 5,774; Referees: Horáček, Novotný (CZE)

31 July 2024; 14:00	Spain	37–33	Japan	Paris Expo Porte de Versailles, Paris; Attendance: 5,813; Referees: Pavićević, Ražnatović (MNE)
31 July 2024; 14:00	Odriozola 6	(20–18)	Fujisaka, Yasuhira 7	Paris Expo Porte de Versailles, Paris; Attendance: 5,813; Referees: Pavićević, Ražnatović (MNE)
31 July 2024; 14:00	1× (yellow card)	Report	1× (yellow card) 1× (suspension)	Paris Expo Porte de Versailles, Paris; Attendance: 5,813; Referees: Pavićević, Ražnatović (MNE)

31 July 2024; 16:00	Slovenia	29–24	Sweden	Paris Expo Porte de Versailles, Paris; Attendance: 5,813; Referees: Brunner, Salah (SUI)
31 July 2024; 16:00	Janc 10	(15–14)	Wanne 6	Paris Expo Porte de Versailles, Paris; Attendance: 5,813; Referees: Brunner, Salah (SUI)
31 July 2024; 16:00	1× (yellow card) 4× (suspension) 1× (red card)	Report	1× (yellow card) 3× (suspension) 1×	Paris Expo Porte de Versailles, Paris; Attendance: 5,813; Referees: Brunner, Salah (SUI)

2 August 2024; 14:00	Croatia	27–38	Sweden	Paris Expo Porte de Versailles, Paris; Attendance: 5,774; Referees: C. Bonaventura, J. Bonaventura (FRA)
2 August 2024; 14:00	Martinović 8	(15–18)	Pellas 9	Paris Expo Porte de Versailles, Paris; Attendance: 5,774; Referees: C. Bonaventura, J. Bonaventura (FRA)
2 August 2024; 14:00	1× (yellow card) 4× (suspension)	Report	3× (suspension)	Paris Expo Porte de Versailles, Paris; Attendance: 5,774; Referees: C. Bonaventura, J. Bonaventura (FRA)

2 August 2024; 16:00	Germany	33–31	Spain	Paris Expo Porte de Versailles, Paris; Attendance: 5,774; Referees: Nachevski, Nikolov (MKD)
2 August 2024; 16:00	Uščins 8	(20–18)	Gómez 10	Paris Expo Porte de Versailles, Paris; Attendance: 5,774; Referees: Nachevski, Nikolov (MKD)
2 August 2024; 16:00	5× (suspension)	Report	3× (suspension)	Paris Expo Porte de Versailles, Paris; Attendance: 5,774; Referees: Nachevski, Nikolov (MKD)

2 August 2024; 19:00	Japan	28–29	Slovenia	Paris Expo Porte de Versailles, Paris; Attendance: 5,652; Referees: Hansen, Madsen (DEN)
2 August 2024; 19:00	Yasuhira 8	(15–15)	Vlah 14	Paris Expo Porte de Versailles, Paris; Attendance: 5,652; Referees: Hansen, Madsen (DEN)
2 August 2024; 19:00	7× (suspension)	Report	1× (yellow card) 6× (suspension)	Paris Expo Porte de Versailles, Paris; Attendance: 5,652; Referees: Hansen, Madsen (DEN)

4 August 2024; 09:00	Sweden	40–27	Japan	Paris Expo Porte de Versailles, Paris; Attendance: 5,808; Referees: Schulze, Tönnies (GER)
4 August 2024; 09:00	Karlsson 6	(16–9)	Sugioka 9	Paris Expo Porte de Versailles, Paris; Attendance: 5,808; Referees: Schulze, Tönnies (GER)
4 August 2024; 09:00	2× (suspension)	Report	2× (suspension)	Paris Expo Porte de Versailles, Paris; Attendance: 5,808; Referees: Schulze, Tönnies (GER)

4 August 2024; 14:00	Germany	36–29	Slovenia	Paris Expo Porte de Versailles, Paris; Attendance: 5,685; Referees: Jørum, Kleven (NOR)
4 August 2024; 14:00	Häfner 7	(23–14)	Horžen 7	Paris Expo Porte de Versailles, Paris; Attendance: 5,685; Referees: Jørum, Kleven (NOR)
4 August 2024; 14:00	1× (suspension)	Report	1× (suspension)	Paris Expo Porte de Versailles, Paris; Attendance: 5,685; Referees: Jørum, Kleven (NOR)

4 August 2024; 21:00	Spain	32–31	Croatia	Paris Expo Porte de Versailles, Paris; Attendance: 5,723; Referees: Horáček, Novotný (CZE)
4 August 2024; 21:00	Rodríguez 6	(20–15)	Klarica 7	Paris Expo Porte de Versailles, Paris; Attendance: 5,723; Referees: Horáček, Novotný (CZE)
4 August 2024; 21:00	2× (suspension)	Report	1× (yellow card) 6× (suspension)	Paris Expo Porte de Versailles, Paris; Attendance: 5,723; Referees: Horáček, Novotný (CZE)

=== Group B ===
Pos	Team	Pld	W	D	L	GF	GA	GD	Pts	Qualification
1	Denmark	5	5	0	0	165	133	+32	10	Quarterfinals
2	Egypt	5	3	1	1	148	140	+8	7	Quarterfinals
3	Norway	5	3	0	2	139	136	+3	6	Quarterfinals
4	France (H)	5	2	1	2	129	131	−2	5	Quarterfinals
5	Hungary	5	1	0	4	137	138	−1	2	
6	Argentina	5	0	0	5	131	171	−40	0	

Source: Olympics Paris 2024 rankings
Rules for classification: 1) Points; 2) Head-to-head points; 3) Head-to-head goal difference; 4) Head-to-head goals scored; 5) Goal difference; 6) Goals scored; 7) Draw.
(H) Hosts

27 July 2024; 11:00	Hungary	32–35	Egypt	Paris Expo Porte de Versailles, Paris; Attendance: 5,776; Referees: Nachevski, Nikolov (MKD)
27 July 2024; 11:00	Imre 7	(15–19)	Adel, Omar 9	Paris Expo Porte de Versailles, Paris; Attendance: 5,776; Referees: Nachevski, Nikolov (MKD)
27 July 2024; 11:00	4× (suspension)	Report	1× (yellow card) 2× (suspension)	Paris Expo Porte de Versailles, Paris; Attendance: 5,776; Referees: Nachevski, Nikolov (MKD)

27 July 2024; 16:00	Norway	36–31	Argentina	Paris Expo Porte de Versailles, Paris; Attendance: 5,749; Referees: Horáček, Novotný (CZE)
27 July 2024; 16:00	Grøndahl 8	(22–15)	D. Simonet 5	Paris Expo Porte de Versailles, Paris; Attendance: 5,749; Referees: Horáček, Novotný (CZE)
27 July 2024; 16:00	1× (red card)	Report	3× (suspension)	Paris Expo Porte de Versailles, Paris; Attendance: 5,749; Referees: Horáček, Novotný (CZE)

27 July 2024; 21:00	Denmark	37–29	France	Paris Expo Porte de Versailles, Paris; Attendance: 5,739; Referees: Schulze, Tönnies (GER)
27 July 2024; 21:00	Gidsel, Pytlick 11	(18–17)	Descat 7	Paris Expo Porte de Versailles, Paris; Attendance: 5,739; Referees: Schulze, Tönnies (GER)
27 July 2024; 21:00	1× (yellow card)	Report	1× (yellow card) 4× (suspension)	Paris Expo Porte de Versailles, Paris; Attendance: 5,739; Referees: Schulze, Tönnies (GER)

29 July 2024; 14:00	Egypt	27–30	Denmark	Paris Expo Porte de Versailles, Paris; Attendance: 5,764; Referees: Lah, Sok (SLO)
29 July 2024; 14:00	three players 5	(9–19)	Arnoldsen, Gidsel 8	Paris Expo Porte de Versailles, Paris; Attendance: 5,764; Referees: Lah, Sok (SLO)
29 July 2024; 14:00	1× (yellow card) 3× (suspension)	Report	1× (yellow card) 3× (suspension)	Paris Expo Porte de Versailles, Paris; Attendance: 5,764; Referees: Lah, Sok (SLO)

29 July 2024; 19:00	France	22–27	Norway	Paris Expo Porte de Versailles, Paris; Attendance: 5,602; Referees: García, Marín (ESP)
29 July 2024; 19:00	Mem 10	(11–16)	Blonz 7	Paris Expo Porte de Versailles, Paris; Attendance: 5,602; Referees: García, Marín (ESP)
29 July 2024; 19:00	1× (yellow card) 1× (suspension)	Report	2× (suspension)	Paris Expo Porte de Versailles, Paris; Attendance: 5,602; Referees: García, Marín (ESP)

29 July 2024; 21:00	Argentina	25–35	Hungary	Paris Expo Porte de Versailles, Paris; Attendance: 5,602; Referees: Schulze, Tönnies (GER)
29 July 2024; 21:00	P. Simonet 5	(12–17)	Imre 7	Paris Expo Porte de Versailles, Paris; Attendance: 5,602; Referees: Schulze, Tönnies (GER)
29 July 2024; 21:00	4× (suspension) 2× (red card)	Report	3× (suspension)	Paris Expo Porte de Versailles, Paris; Attendance: 5,602; Referees: Schulze, Tönnies (GER)

31 July 2024; 09:00	Norway	26–25	Hungary	Paris Expo Porte de Versailles, Paris; Attendance: 5,774; Referees: Lah, Sok (SLO)
31 July 2024; 09:00	Blonz 9	(11–13)	three players 6	Paris Expo Porte de Versailles, Paris; Attendance: 5,774; Referees: Lah, Sok (SLO)
31 July 2024; 09:00	4× (suspension)	Report	3× (suspension)	Paris Expo Porte de Versailles, Paris; Attendance: 5,774; Referees: Lah, Sok (SLO)

31 July 2024; 19:00	France	26–26	Egypt	Paris Expo Porte de Versailles, Paris; Attendance: 5,780; Referees: Kurtagic, Wetterwik (SWE)
31 July 2024; 19:00	Fabregas 5	(11–15)	Omar 8	Paris Expo Porte de Versailles, Paris; Attendance: 5,780; Referees: Kurtagic, Wetterwik (SWE)
31 July 2024; 19:00	3× (suspension)	Report	2× (suspension)	Paris Expo Porte de Versailles, Paris; Attendance: 5,780; Referees: Kurtagic, Wetterwik (SWE)

31 July 2024; 21:00	Denmark	38–27	Argentina	Paris Expo Porte de Versailles, Paris; Attendance: 5,780; Referees: Belkhiri, Hamidi (ALG)
31 July 2024; 21:00	Gidsel 13	(19–14)	Parker 6	Paris Expo Porte de Versailles, Paris; Attendance: 5,780; Referees: Belkhiri, Hamidi (ALG)
31 July 2024; 21:00	5× (suspension)	Report	2× (yellow card) 4× (suspension) 1× (red card)	Paris Expo Porte de Versailles, Paris; Attendance: 5,780; Referees: Belkhiri, Hamidi (ALG)

2 August 2024; 09:00	Hungary	25–28	Denmark	Paris Expo Porte de Versailles, Paris; Attendance: 5,764; Referees: García, Marín (ESP)
2 August 2024; 09:00	Ilić 5	(14–16)	Gidsel 8	Paris Expo Porte de Versailles, Paris; Attendance: 5,764; Referees: García, Marín (ESP)
2 August 2024; 09:00	6× (suspension)	Report	1× (suspension)	Paris Expo Porte de Versailles, Paris; Attendance: 5,764; Referees: García, Marín (ESP)

2 August 2024; 11:00	Argentina	21–28	France	Paris Expo Porte de Versailles, Paris; Attendance: 5,764; Referees: Pavićević, Ražnatović (MNE)
2 August 2024; 11:00	Parker 7	(8–15)	Descat 8	Paris Expo Porte de Versailles, Paris; Attendance: 5,764; Referees: Pavićević, Ražnatović (MNE)
2 August 2024; 11:00	4× (suspension)	Report	1× (yellow card) 1× (suspension)	Paris Expo Porte de Versailles, Paris; Attendance: 5,764; Referees: Pavićević, Ražnatović (MNE)

2 August 2024; 21:00	Norway	25–26	Egypt	Paris Expo Porte de Versailles, Paris; Attendance: 5,652; Referees: Schulze, Tönnies (GER)
2 August 2024; 21:00	Reinkind 7	(13–14)	Omar 7	Paris Expo Porte de Versailles, Paris; Attendance: 5,652; Referees: Schulze, Tönnies (GER)
2 August 2024; 21:00	2× (suspension) 1× (red card)	Report	2× (suspension)	Paris Expo Porte de Versailles, Paris; Attendance: 5,652; Referees: Schulze, Tönnies (GER)

4 August 2024; 11:00	Egypt	34–27	Argentina	Paris Expo Porte de Versailles, Paris; Attendance: 5,808; Referees: Bíró, Kiss (HUN)
4 August 2024; 11:00	S. El-Deraa, Zein 6	(14–15)	F. Pizarro 6	Paris Expo Porte de Versailles, Paris; Attendance: 5,808; Referees: Bíró, Kiss (HUN)
4 August 2024; 11:00	4× (suspension)	Report	1× (suspension)	Paris Expo Porte de Versailles, Paris; Attendance: 5,808; Referees: Bíró, Kiss (HUN)

4 August 2024; 16:00	Hungary	20–24	France	Paris Expo Porte de Versailles, Paris; Attendance: 5,685; Referees: Hansen, Madsen (DEN)
4 August 2024; 16:00	Imre 6	(8–11)	Prandi 7	Paris Expo Porte de Versailles, Paris; Attendance: 5,685; Referees: Hansen, Madsen (DEN)
4 August 2024; 16:00		Report	1× (yellow card) 2× (suspension)	Paris Expo Porte de Versailles, Paris; Attendance: 5,685; Referees: Hansen, Madsen (DEN)

4 August 2024; 19:00	Denmark	32–25	Norway	Paris Expo Porte de Versailles, Paris; Attendance: 5,723; Referees: Nachevski, Nikolov (MKD)
4 August 2024; 19:00	Pytlick 9	(17–12)	Reinkind 6	Paris Expo Porte de Versailles, Paris; Attendance: 5,723; Referees: Nachevski, Nikolov (MKD)
4 August 2024; 19:00	2× (yellow card) 3× (suspension)	Report	4× (suspension)	Paris Expo Porte de Versailles, Paris; Attendance: 5,723; Referees: Nachevski, Nikolov (MKD)

== Knockout stage ==
=== Bracket ===
Quarterfinals
7 August
Germany (ET)	35
France	34
7 August
Spain (ET)	29
Egypt	28
7 August
Norway	28
Slovenia	33
7 August
Denmark	32
Sweden	31

Semifinals
9 August
Germany	25
Spain	24
9 August
Slovenia	30
Denmark	31

Gold medal
11 August
Germany	26
Denmark	39
Bronze medal
11 August
Spain	23
Slovenia	22

=== Quarterfinals ===
7 August 2024
09:30
Spain
29–28 (ET)
Egypt
Stade Pierre-Mauroy, Lille
Attendance: 25,697
Referees: Horáček, Novotný (CZE)
Gómez 9
(8–12)
Y. El-Deraa 8
2× (suspension)
Report
5× (suspension)

FT: 25–25 ET: 4–3

7 August 2024
13:30
Germany
35–34 (ET)
France
Stade Pierre-Mauroy, Lille
Attendance: 27,014
Referees: Hansen, Madsen (DEN)
Uščins 14
(14–17)
Mem 10
3× (suspension)
Report
1× (yellow card) 6× (suspension)

FT: 29–29 ET: 6–5

7 August 2024; 17:30	Denmark	32–31	Sweden	Stade Pierre-Mauroy, Lille; Attendance: 26,449; Referees: C. Bonaventura, J. Bonaventura (FRA)
7 August 2024; 17:30	Pytlick 9	(16–16)	Claar 7	Stade Pierre-Mauroy, Lille; Attendance: 26,449; Referees: C. Bonaventura, J. Bonaventura (FRA)
7 August 2024; 17:30	2× (yellow card) 3× (suspension)	Report	1× (yellow card) 4× (suspension)	Stade Pierre-Mauroy, Lille; Attendance: 26,449; Referees: C. Bonaventura, J. Bonaventura (FRA)

7 August 2024; 21:30	Norway	28–33	Slovenia	Stade Pierre-Mauroy, Lille; Attendance: 26,406; Referees: García, Marín (ESP)
7 August 2024; 21:30	Blonz 7	(12–16)	Vlah 11	Stade Pierre-Mauroy, Lille; Attendance: 26,406; Referees: García, Marín (ESP)
7 August 2024; 21:30	4× (suspension)	Report	1× (yellow card) 1× (suspension) 1× (red card)	Stade Pierre-Mauroy, Lille; Attendance: 26,406; Referees: García, Marín (ESP)

=== Semifinals ===
9 August 2024; 16:30	Germany	25–24	Spain	Stade Pierre-Mauroy, Lille; Attendance: 22,745; Referees: Nachevski, Nikolov (MKD)
9 August 2024; 16:30	Uščins 6	(12–12)	Fernández 5	Stade Pierre-Mauroy, Lille; Attendance: 22,745; Referees: Nachevski, Nikolov (MKD)
9 August 2024; 16:30	1× (yellow card) 1× (suspension)	Report	1× (yellow card) 1× (suspension)	Stade Pierre-Mauroy, Lille; Attendance: 22,745; Referees: Nachevski, Nikolov (MKD)

9 August 2024; 21:30	Slovenia	30–31	Denmark	Stade Pierre-Mauroy, Lille; Attendance: 22,329; Referees: Horáček, Novotný (CZE)
9 August 2024; 21:30	Bombač, Vlah 7	(10–15)	M. Landin 6	Stade Pierre-Mauroy, Lille; Attendance: 22,329; Referees: Horáček, Novotný (CZE)
9 August 2024; 21:30	3× (suspension)	Report	1× (suspension)	Stade Pierre-Mauroy, Lille; Attendance: 22,329; Referees: Horáček, Novotný (CZE)

=== Bronze medal game ===
11 August 2024; 09:00	Spain	23–22	Slovenia	Stade Pierre-Mauroy, Lille; Attendance: 17,242; Referees: Hansen, Madsen (DEN)
11 August 2024; 09:00	Gómez 5	(12–12)	Dolenec 6	Stade Pierre-Mauroy, Lille; Attendance: 17,242; Referees: Hansen, Madsen (DEN)
11 August 2024; 09:00	2× (yellow card) 2× (suspension)	Report	3× (suspension)	Stade Pierre-Mauroy, Lille; Attendance: 17,242; Referees: Hansen, Madsen (DEN)

=== Gold medal game ===
11 August 2024; 13:30	Germany	26–39	Denmark	Stade Pierre-Mauroy, Lille; Attendance: 27,328; Referees: Lah, Sok (SLO)
11 August 2024; 13:30	Knorr 6	(12–21)	Gidsel 11	Stade Pierre-Mauroy, Lille; Attendance: 27,328; Referees: Lah, Sok (SLO)
11 August 2024; 13:30	1× (suspension)	Report	1× (suspension)	Stade Pierre-Mauroy, Lille; Attendance: 27,328; Referees: Lah, Sok (SLO)

== Ranking and statistics ==
=== Final ranking ===
Rank	Team
1st place, gold medalist(s)	Denmark
2nd place, silver medalist(s)	Germany
3rd place, bronze medalist(s)	Spain
4	Slovenia
5	Egypt
6	Norway
7	Sweden
8	France
9	Croatia
10	Hungary
11	Japan
12	Argentina

=== All Star Team ===
The all-star team was announced after the final on 11 August 2024.

Position	Player
Goalkeeper	(Denmark) Niklas Landin Jacobsen
Right wing	(Slovenia) Blaž Janc
Right back	(Germany) Renārs Uščins
Centre back	(Germany) Juri Knorr
Left back	(Denmark) Simon Pytlick
Left wing	(Spain) Daniel Fernández
Pivot	(Denmark) Lukas Jørgensen
MVP	(Denmark) Mathias Gidsel

=== Top goalscorers ===
Rank	Name	Goals	Shots	%
1	(Denmark) Mathias Gidsel	62	83	75
2	(Slovenia) Aleks Vlah	56	87	64
3	(Denmark) Simon Pytlick	54	79	68
4	(Germany) Renārs Uščins	52	76	68
5	(Spain) Aleix Gómez	48	61	79
6	(Slovenia) Blaž Janc	43	58	74
7	(Germany) Johannes Golla	37	47	79
7	(France) Dika Mem	37	60	62
9	(France) Hugo Descat	34	45	76
10	(Germany) Juri Knorr	33	52	63

Source: Olympics Paris 2024 goalscorers

=== Top goalkeepers ===
Rank	Name	%	Saves	Shots
1	(Hungary) Roland Mikler	40	23	58
2	(France) Vincent Gérard	35	68	192
3	(Sweden) Tobias Thulin	34	35	102
4	(Croatia) Dominik Kuzmanović	33	56	171
4	(Spain) Gonzalo Pérez de Vargas	33	82	251
6	(Egypt) Mohamed Aly	32	46	142
6	(Spain) Rodrigo Corrales	32	24	74
6	(Slovenia) Klemen Ferlin	32	56	177
9	(Denmark) Emil Nielsen	31	48	157
9	(Hungary) Kristóf Palasics	31	33	107
9	(Sweden) Andreas Palicka	31	46	147
9	(Germany) David Späth	31	40	131
9	(Germany) Andreas Wolff	31	66	210

Source: Olympics Paris 2024 goalkeepers

== Medalists ==
Gold	Silver	Bronze
Denmark Niklas Landin Jacobsen (c) (GK); Niclas Kirkeløkke; Magnus Landin Jacobsen; Emil Jakobsen; Rasmus Lauge; Emil Nielsen (GK); Magnus Saugstrup; Hans Lindberg; Mathias Gidsel; Henrik Møllgaard; Mikkel Hansen; Lukas Jørgensen; Lasse Andersson; Simon Hald; Thomas Sommer Arnoldsen; Simon Pytlick Head coach: Nikolaj Jacobsen	Germany David Späth (GK); Johannes Golla (c); Luca Witzke; Sebastian Heymann; Justus Fischer; Juri Knorr; Julian Köster; Renārs Uščins; Kai Häfner; Tim Hornke; Andreas Wolff (GK); Rune Dahmke; Lukas Mertens; Christoph Steinert; Marko Grgić; Jannik Kohlbacher Head coach: Alfreð Gíslason	Spain Gonzalo Pérez de Vargas (c) (GK); Jorge Maqueda; Alex Dujshebaev; Rodrigo Corrales (GK); Adrià Figueras; Imanol Garciandia; Abel Serdio; Agustín Casado; Aleix Gómez; Ian Tarrafeta; Miguel Sánchez-Migallón; Daniel Dujshebaev; Kauldi Odriozola; Daniel Fernández; Javier Rodríguez Head coach: Jordi Ribera
