= Denmark men's national handball team =

Men's national handball team representing Denmark

Denmark

Information
- Association: Danish Handball Association
- Coach: Nikolaj Jacobsen
- Assistant coach: Michael Bruun Pedersen and Henrik Møllgaard
- Captain: Magnus Saugstrup
- Most caps: Lars Christiansen (338)
- Most goals: Lars Christiansen (1503)

Colours
1st	2nd

Results

Summer Olympics
- Appearances: 9 (First in 1972)
- Best result: (gold) 1st (2016, 2024)

World Championship
- Appearances: 26 (First in 1938)
- Best result: (gold) 1st (2019, 2021, 2023, 2025)

European Championship
- Appearances: 16 (First in 1994)
- Best result: (gold) 1st (2008, 2012, 2026)
- Last updated on 1 february 2026.

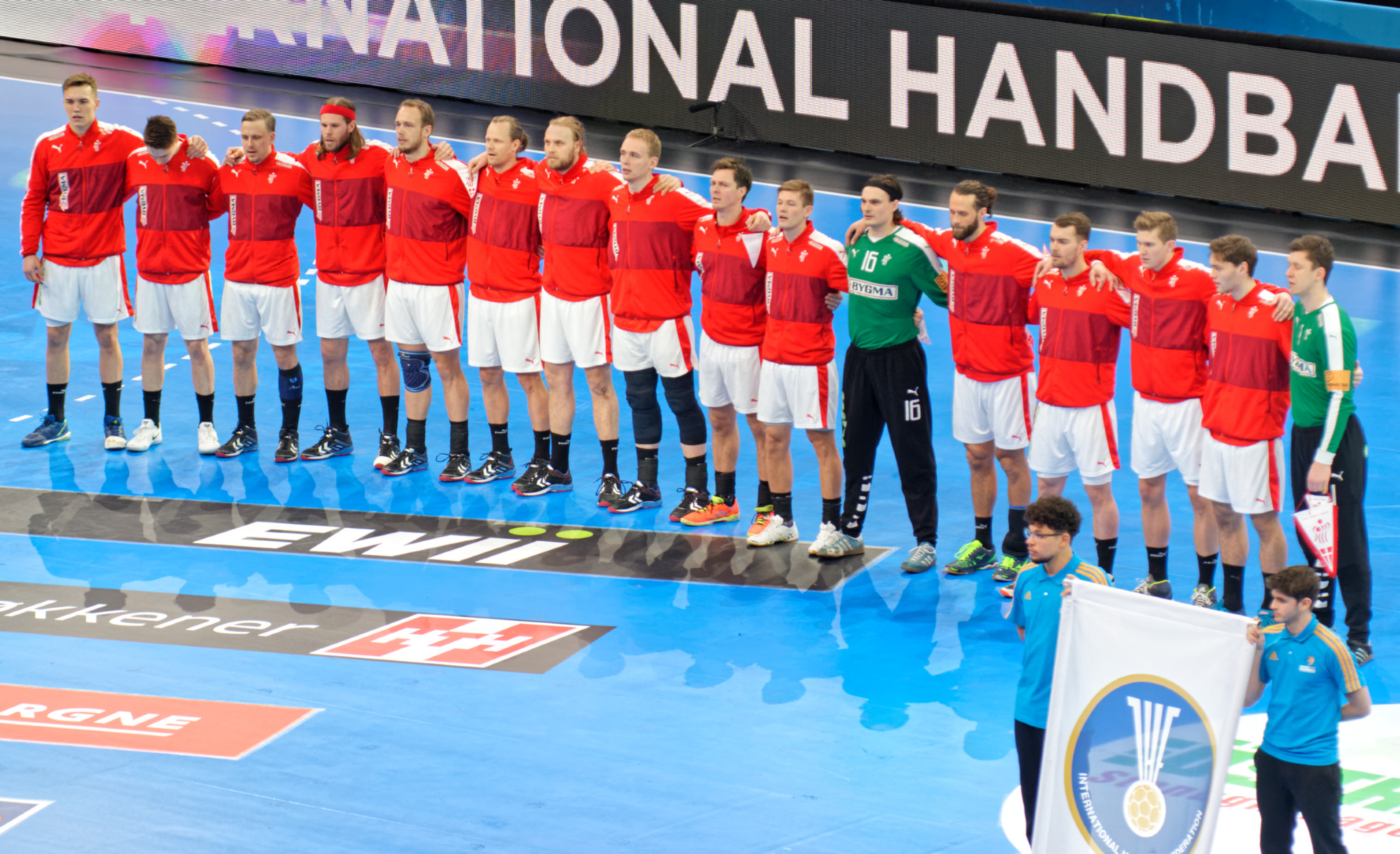
2017 World Men's Handball Championship Sweden / Denmark (Group D) 16 January 2017.

Denmark men's national handball team
Medal record

Olympic Games
Gold medal – first place	2016 Rio de Janeiro	Team
Gold medal – first place	2024 Paris	Team
Silver medal – second place	2020 Tokyo	Team

World Championship
Gold medal – first place	2019 Denmark/Germany	
Gold medal – first place	2021 Egypt	
Gold medal – first place	2023 Poland/Sweden	
Gold medal – first place	2025 Croatia/Denmark/Norway	
Silver medal – second place	1967 Sweden	
Silver medal – second place	2011 Sweden	
Silver medal – second place	2013 Spain	
Bronze medal – third place	2007 Germany	

World Outdoor Championship
Silver medal – second place	1948 France	

European Championship
Gold medal – first place	2008 Norway	
Gold medal – first place	2012 Serbia	
Gold medal – first place	2026 Denmark/Norway/Sweden	
Silver medal – second place	2014 Denmark	
Silver medal – second place	2024 Germany	
Bronze medal – third place	2002 Sweden	
Bronze medal – third place	2004 Slovenia	
Bronze medal – third place	2006 Switzerland	
Bronze medal – third place	2022 Hungary/Slovakia	

The Denmark men's national handball team (Danish: Danmarks håndboldlandshold, lit. 'Denmark's national handball team') is controlled by the Danish Handball Association and represents Denmark in international matches. They are the team with the second most gold medals won in the World Cup history on the men's side behind France, with a total of four medals, tied with Sweden and Romania.

As of February 2026, they are the Olympic Champions, winners of four consecutive World Championships (2019, 2021, 2023 & 2025), being the first country to ever do so, and current European Champions after winning the 2026 European Championship, thereby holding all three major international titles simultaneously. They also made Denmark the First Nation to have both a men's team, and a women's team to hold all three titles simultaneously as Denmarks women's national team held all titles in 1997.

Defending their 2019 World Championship title at the 2021 World Championship in Egypt, they became only the fourth country to successfully defend a World Championship title. (The others being Sweden, Romania and France).

By winning the World Championship in 2023, they became the first team on the men's side, to win three World Championship titles in a row, winning in 2019, 2021 & 2023. By winning again in 2025, they extended this record to four consecutive World Championship titles.

They are also the only team to have won nineteen consecutive World Championship matches, from 2019 to 2021, surpassing the eighteen match winning streak by France. In January 2025, they became the first team ever to not lose in 37 games in a row at the World Championships spanning from 2019–present, beating the previous record by France who had a 25 winning streak set between 2015 and 2019.

As of January 2025, they are the third most successful team in World Championship history behind France and Sweden, having won eight medals. Four of these are gold (2019, 2021, 2023, 2025), three silver (1967, 2011, 2013) and one bronze (2007).

== History ==
Handball is one of the most popular pastimes in Denmark, and it is the second most popular team sport only exceeded by football. At the end of 2003, the Danish Handball Association had more than 146,000 active and passive members.

=== Early history ===
The first official national team game was played on 20 August 1934 as a 11v11 outdoor match against Germany. The first indoor match was held the following year on March 8 against Sweden.

At the 1967 World Championship Denmark surprised most people when they took silver medals, their first ever medals in any tournament. The beat USSR in the semifinal and lost to Czechoslovakia in the final.

Denmark was the host of the World Cup for the first time in 1978. Led by Leif Mikkelsen, the Danish team finished fourth, and has been descriped as the 'first modern Danish handball team'. The key players were Thomas Pazyl, Mogens Jeppesen and Morten Stig Christensen. The team earned the nickname 'Bolsjedrengene', due to their striped jerseys being compared to the sweets Kongen af Danmark. The team would finished 4th two more times at the 1982 World Championship and the 1984 Olympics, earning them a reputation of always finishing fourth. This period has been descriped as the period where the national team entered the public consicience.

=== Early 2000's with Torben Winther ===
In 2000 Torben Winther was appointed head coach. He won bronze medals at the 2002 European Men's Handball Championship, losing to Germany in the semifinal and beating Iceland in the third place-playoff. This was Denmark's first ever medals at a European Championship and first medals at any tournament since 1967. He followed it up by winning another bronze medal at the 2004 European Men's Handball Championship. It would not last forever though, and after a disappointing 13th finish at the 2005 World Men's Handball Championship Winther was fired.

=== Ulrik Wilbek takes over ===
Torben Winther was replaced by Ulrik Wilbek, who had previously coached the Denmark women's national handball team from 1992 to 1997. Under him Denmark won another bronze medal at the 2006 European Championship.

=== 2007 World Championship ===
In 2007 Denmark participated in the World Championship in Germany, where they were pitted in Group E against Angola, Hungary and their neighbors to the north Norway. Denmark finished second in their group after victories against Angola and Norway. In the main round the team faced Croatia, the Czech Republic, Russia, Hungary and defending champions Spain.

Despite an initial defeat against Croatia, the team advanced by defeating their last three opponents. In the quarterfinal Iceland was defeated by the narrowest of margins, 42–41. In the semi-final Denmark lost to Poland 36–33 and ended up in the bronze match against France, which they won 34–27 thus placing third.

Denmark's pivot Michael V. Knudsen was added to the All Star Team of the tournament.

=== 2008 European Championship ===
After finishing third in three consecutive European Championships, the Danish team won gold at the 2008 European Men's Handball Championship, which took place in neighboring Norway. The team lost only one match on the way to gold in a fiercely contested derby against hosts Norway. The Danish team defeated Croatia 24–20 in the final after inching out Germany in the semis. Keeper Kasper Hvidt and winger Lars Christiansen were important factors in the Danish campaign, both being selected for the tournament all-star team and Lars Christiansen also finishing as shared top goalscorer.

=== 2010 European Championship ===
As defending champions, Denmark was a favorite to reclaim the title. However, they did not succeed, losing matches to both Iceland and Croatia. Instead of advancing to the main-round Denmark ended up playing for fifth place against Spain. They won the placement match 34–27.

=== 2011 World Championship ===
At The 2011 World Men's Handball Championship, after winning nine consecutive matches, Denmark reached the final beating Spain 28:24 in the semi-final. This was the first time in over 44 years, that the Denmark National Handball Team reached a World Championship final. In the final, Denmark lost against France 35:37 in overtime. This meant at the time, that France was able to hold all three major titles as reigning European Champions, Olympic Champions and also double World Champions.

=== 2012 European Championship ===
Denmark came to the 2012 European Men's Handball Championship as vice World Champions and as one of the pre-favorites to win the tournament. However, in the main group, Denmark lost to both Serbia and Poland, proceeding to the main round with zero points, having only won against Slovakia. This meant that Denmark had to win all of their matches and at the same time, they had to rely on other results in order to advance to the semi-finals. Miraculously, results from other matches were in favor of Denmark. The destiny of Denmark's survival lay in the hands of Poland as Poland had to win against Germany in order to sustain Denmark's survival in the tournament. After a fierce and close match between Poland and Germany, Poland won 33–32. This meant that Denmark only had to beat Sweden in their final main round match, and they would go through to the semi-finals. Denmark beat Sweden by a large margin, 31–24, making handball history along the way, becoming the first team ever, both on the men's and women's side in European Championship history to advance to the semi-finals having carried zero points into the main round.

Like the 2011 World Men's Handball Championship, Denmark met Spain in the semi-finals, a match Denmark won 25–24. In the other semi-final, hosting nation Serbia met Croatia, a match Serbia won 26–22.

In a low scoring match, Denmark won their second European Championship title after beating Serbia 21–19 in the final, thus becoming the first handball team ever claiming the European Championship title having carried zero points into the main round.

=== 2013 World Championship ===
Despite having disappointed at the 2012 Olympics in London, Denmark was still among the top teams to win the World Champions title. As defending European Champions, Denmark was seated with Russia, Iceland, Macedonia, Qatar and Chile in Group B. Winning all of their matches, they advanced safely to the 16th round where they had to meet Tunisia. Having no problems defeating Tunisia with the score of 30–23, Denmark reached the Quarterfinals where Hungary awaited. After a splendid first half, leading 18–11, the second half was a more close affair, though Denmark managed to win 28–26, reaching the semi-finals for the second consecutive time in this tournament. In the semi-finals, Denmark was seated with Croatia who had beaten the defending World Champions, France, in their semi-final. Though the odds where in favor of Croatia, Denmark played their best match in the 2013 World Championship so far, winning 30–24 and securing their second consecutive World Championship final.

In the final, Denmark was up against hosting nation, Spain. The final became a horrendous game for Denmark, losing with a record-breaking 16 goals, and losing the title for the second time in a row, with Spain declared as winner of the tournament for the second time in history.

In October 2013, it was announced that Ulrik Wilbek would be replaced as the head coach for Denmark on 1 July 2014 by Icelandic coach Gudmundur Gudmundsson.

=== 2014 European Championship ===
As vice world champions, defending European Champions and the advantage of home court, Denmark were among the favorites to win the tournament. They won all of the matches in the preliminary round as well as the main round easily advancing to the semi-finals. Denmark met Croatia in the semi-final. They beat Croatia, 29–27, but lost to the France national team in the finals, losing 41–32. This was the second time in a row, that Denmark lost a Championship, losing to Spain at the 2013 World Championship.

=== 2016 Olympics ===
Denmark won their first ever Olympic gold at the 2016 Olympics. Denmark finished 3rd in group A behind Croatia and France. Denmark would then go on to beat Slovenia and Poland on the road to the final, where they met France again. Despite losing their first encounter, Denmark won the final 33–30 with Mikkel Hansen being the top scorer with 8 goals.

Denmark had three players in the all-star team: Niklas Landin, Lasse Svan and Mikkel Hansen. Mikkel Hansen also won the MVP Award.

During the Olympics, former coach Ulrik Wilbek made two attempts to gain the consent of the Danish players to fire Guðmundur, once during the tournament and then the day after Denmark won the gold. He announced in November 2016 that he would not renew his contract, which was set to expire on 1 July 2017. After his departure from the Denmark team, Guðmundur criticized his predecessor Wilbek's, who was then the head of the Danish Handball Federation, for repeated attempts to undercut his management of the team during the Olympics.

After the controversy, Wilbek resigned from DHF.

=== 2017 World Championship and Nikolaj Jacobsen takes over ===
Gudmundsson's last tournament was the 2017 World Men's Handball Championship, where Denmark finished 10th after winning their group with Sweden, Egypt, Qatar, Argentina and Bahrain, but then they lost the first play-off match 25–27 to Hungary.

After the tournament Nikolaj Jacobsen was appointed as head coach, which would mark the start of Denmarks ascend to become the best team in the world.

=== 2019 World Championship ===
Denmark along with Germany co-hosted the 2019 World Championship and played in Group C with Norway, Tunisia, Chile, Austria and Saudi Arabia. Started with a victory over Chile and remained undefeated. Then played in Group II in the main round the first match with a win over Hungary, also undefeated, played in the semi-finals. A win over six-time world champions France put them in the final. Denmark won world championship title with a 31–22 victory over Norway in the final.

=== 2021 Olympics ===
At the 2020 Olympics (played in 2021) Denmark reached the final, but would lose to France. They won group B and beat Norway and Spain in the knock-outs, but would eventually lose to France 27–25 in the final.

Mathias Gidsel and Mikkel Hansen were chosen for the all-star team.

=== 2021 World Championship ===
Denmark qualified for the 2021 World Championship in Egypt as defending champions. They went undefeated and won the second successive world title. They also became the only team, to win nineteen national matches in a row at World Championship tournaments from 2019 to 2021, surpassing the eighteen winning streak by France.

=== 2023 World Championship ===
At the 2023 World Championship Denmark became the first men's team to win three consecutive world championship titles. They beat Spain in the semifinal and France in the final.

=== 2024 Olympics ===
Denmark won gold at the 2024 Olympics for a second time. During the tournament they won every single match. In the final they beat Germany 39–26, which is the biggest win in an Olympics final ever.

=== 2025 World Championship ===
Denmark along with Croatia and Norway co-hosted the 2025 World Championship. It was the third time Denmark co-hosted the tournament. They were automatically qualified as co-host. Denmark won the tournament with a dominating performance, having the highest average win margin ever with +13.4, beating Croatia in the final 32–26, Portugal in the semifinal 40-27 and Brazil in the quarter final 33–21. It was the first time a team won four straight World Championships on either the men's or women's side.

They extended their records of most World Championship matches in a row without defeat to 37.

=== 2026 European Championship ===
At the 2026 European Men's Handball Championship Denmark won gold medals, meaning that they now held both the World, European and Olympic titles at the same time, as only the second team ever after France's 'Les Experts'. This was the first European title since 2012, and it meant that Jacobsen now had won all major international tournaments with Denmark. During the tournament Denmark had a bit of an injury crisis, when 3 out of 4 pivots (Bergholt, Hald and Jørgensen) were injured during the tournament. Mads Mensah Larsen was therefore used as a makeshift solution on the pivot.

== Honours ==
Competition	1st place, gold medalist(s)	2nd place, silver medalist(s)	3rd place, bronze medalist(s)	Total
Olympic Games	2	1	0	3
World Championship	4	3	1	8
European Championship	3	2	4	9
Total	9	6	5	20

== Competitive record ==
Champions Runners-up Third place Fourth place

=== Olympic Games ===
The team did not participate in the 1936 field handball tournament at the Olympics, but lost at the 1952 Olympics in a demonstration match against Sweden.

Games	Round	Position	Pld	W	D	L	GF	GA	GD
(Germany) 1936 Berlin	did not participate								
Not held from 1948 to 1968
(West Germany) 1972 Munich	Match for 13th place	13th of 16	5	2	1	2	78	78	0
(Canada) 1976 Montreal	Match for 7th place	8th of 11	5	2	0	3	113	127	−14
(Soviet Union) 1980 Moscow	Match for 9th place	9th of 12	6	2	0	4	124	124	0
(United States) 1984 Los Angeles	Fourth place	4th of 12	6	4	0	2	134	122	+12
(South Korea) 1988 Seoul	did not qualify								
(Spain) 1992 Barcelona	did not qualify								
(United States) 1996 Atlanta	did not qualify								
(Australia) 2000 Sydney	did not qualify								
(Greece) 2004 Athens	did not qualify								
(China) 2008 Beijing	Match for 7th place	7th of 12	8	3	2	3	225	211	+14
(United Kingdom) 2012 London	Quarter-finals	6th of 12	6	4	0	2	146	153	−7
(Brazil) 2016 Rio de Janeiro	Champions	1st of 12	8	6	0	2	230	211	+19
(Japan) 2020 Tokyo	Runners-up	2nd of 12	8	6	0	2	255	212	+43
(France) 2024 Paris	Champions	1st of 12	8	8	0	0	267	220	+47
(United States) 2028 Los Angeles	TBD								
(Australia) 2032 Brisbane	TBD								
Total	9/15	2 Titles	60	37	3	20	1572	1458	+114

=== World Championship ===
Year	Round	Position	GP	W	D*	L	GS	GA
(Nazi Germany) 1938	Semi-finals	4	3	0	0	3	6	20
(Sweden) 1954	Fifth place	5	3	1	0	2	44	45
(East Germany) 1958	Semi-finals	4	6	4	0	2	121	86
(West Germany) 1961	Fifth place	5	6	4	0	2	92	78
(Czechoslovakia) 1964	Seventh place	7	6	3	0	3	105	96
(Sweden) 1967	Runners-up	2	6	4	0	2	92	77
(France) 1970	Semi-finals	4	6	3	0	3	103	116
(East Germany) 1974	Second round	8	6	2	0	4	78	100
(Denmark) 1978	Semi-finals	4	6	4	1	1	114	101
(West Germany) 1982	Semi-finals	4	7	4	1	2	150	143
(Switzerland) 1986	Second round	8	7	3	0	4	152	160
(Czechoslovakia) 1990	did not qualify							
(Sweden) 1993	Second round	9	7	2	2	3	145	156
(Iceland) 1995	Preliminary round	17	5	2	0	3	126	117
(Japan) 1997	did not qualify							
(Egypt) 1999	Round of 16	9	6	4	0	2	141	140
(France) 2001	did not qualify							
(Portugal) 2003	Second round	9	7	4	0	3	201	193
(Tunisia) 2005	Preliminary round	13	5	3	0	2	174	117
(Germany) 2007	Semi-finals	3	10	7	0	3	316	283
(Croatia) 2009	Semi-finals	4	10	7	0	3	299	260
(Sweden) 2011	Runners-up	2	10	9	0	1	330	253
(Spain) 2013	Runners-up	2	9	8	0	1	291	244
(Qatar) 2015	Quarter-finals	5	9	6	2	1	272	234
(France) 2017	Round of 16	10	6	5	0	1	182	157
(Denmark) (Germany) 2019	Champions	1	10	10	0	0	317	223
(Egypt) 2021	Champions	1	9	8	1	0	308	230
(Poland) (Sweden) 2023	Champions	1	9	8	1	0	308	226
(Croatia) (Denmark) (Norway) 2025	Champions	1	9	9	0	0	330	217
(Germany) 2027	Qualified as defending champions							
(France) (Germany) 2029	TBD							
(Denmark) (Iceland) (Norway) 2031	Qualified as co-host							
Total	26/29	4 Titles	183	124	*8	51	4797	4072

=== Euro Tournaments ===
All teams in these tournaments are European, all World and Olympic Champions, and top 7 from World Championships and Olympics were participating. They were mini European championships at the time, till 1994 when official European Championship started.

EURO World Cup tournament Sweden

- 1979 (Sweden) : 5th place
- 1984 (Sweden) : Runners Up
- 1988 (Sweden) : 8th place
- 1992 (Sweden) : 5th place

EURO Super Cup tournament Germany

- 1985 (Germany) : 7th place

=== European Championship ===
Year	Round	Position	GP	W	D	L	GS	GA
(Portugal) 1994	Fourth place	4	7	3	1	3	150	152
(Spain) 1996	11th/12th place	12	6	0	0	6	132	158
(Italy) 1998	did not qualify							
(Croatia) 2000	9th/10th place	10	6	2	0	4	143	153
(Sweden) 2002	Third place	3	8	6	1	1	212	189
(Slovenia) 2004	Third place	3	8	6	0	2	240	206
(Switzerland) 2006	Third place	3	8	5	1	2	253	233
(Norway) 2008	Champions	1	8	7	0	1	233	193
(Austria) 2010	5th/6th place	5	7	5	0	2	198	184
(Serbia) 2012	Champions	1	8	6	0	2	216	201
(Denmark) 2014	Runners-up	2	8	7	0	1	247	222
(Poland) 2016	5th/6th place	6	7	4	1	2	195	180
(Croatia) 2018	Fourth place	4	8	5	0	3	235	215
(Austria) (Norway) (Sweden) 2020	Preliminary round	13	3	1	1	1	85	83
(Hungary) (Slovakia) 2022	Third place	3	9	7	0	2	274	228
(Germany) 2024	Runners-up	2	9	7	0	2	281	233
(Denmark) (Norway) (Sweden) 2026	Champions	1	9	8	0	1	306	244
(Spain) (Portugal) (Switzerland) 2028	Qualified as defending champions							
(Czech Republic) (Denmark) (Poland) 2030	Qualified as co-host							
(France) (Germany) 2032	TBD							
Total	18/20	3 Titles	119	79	5	35	3400	3074

*Denotes draws including knockout matches decided in a penalty shootout.
**Gold background color indicates that the tournament was won. Red border color indicates tournament was held on home soil.

== Team ==
=== Current squad ===
The squad for the 2026 European Men's Handball Championship.

Head coach: Nikolaj Jacobsen

No.	Pos.	Name	Date of birth (age)	Height	App.	Goals	Club
3	RB	Niclas Kirkeløkke	26 March 1994 (age 32)	1.95 m	100	204	(Germany) SG Flensburg-Handewitt
4	LW	Magnus Landin	20 August 1995 (age 31)	2.00 m	163	300	(Germany) THW Kiel
7	LW	Emil Jakobsen	24 January 1998 (age 28)	1.90 m	102	366	(Germany) SG Flensburg-Handewitt
11	CB	Rasmus Lauge	20 June 1991 (age 35)	1.95 m	186	467	(Denmark) Bjerringbro-Silkeborg Håndbold
12	GK	Emil Nielsen	10 March 1997 (age 29)	1.95 m	70	6	(Spain) FC Barcelona
15	P	Magnus Saugstrup (c)	12 July 1996 (age 30)	1.95 m	107	206	(Germany) SC Magdeburg
19	RB	Mathias Gidsel	8 February 1999 (age 27)	1.90 m	97	592	(Germany) Füchse Berlin
20	GK	Kevin Møller	20 June 1989 (age 37)	2.00 m	96	8	(Germany) SG Flensburg-Handewitt
22	CB	Mads Mensah Larsen	12 August 1991 (age 35)	1.88 m	218	339	(Denmark) Skjern Håndbold
25	P	Lukas Jørgensen	31 March 1999 (age 27)	1.94 m	63	178	(Germany) SG Flensburg-Handewitt
26	RW	Jóhan á Plógv Hansen	1 May 1994 (age 32)	1.90 m	111	202	(Denmark) Skanderborg AGF Håndbold
28	LB	Lasse Andersson	11 March 1994 (age 32)	1.96 m	88	122	(Germany) Füchse Berlin
33	P	Emil Bergholt	25 August 1997 (age 29)	1.90 m	25	13	(Denmark) Skjern Håndbold
34	P	Simon Hald	28 September 1994 (age 31)	2.03 m	114	118	(Denmark) Aalborg Håndbold
38	RB	Mads Hoxer	6 December 2000 (age 25)	1.95 m	12	26	(Denmark) Aalborg Håndbold
42	CB	Thomas Arnoldsen	11 January 2002 (age 24)	1.94 m	30	73	(Denmark) Aalborg Håndbold
43	LB	Simon Pytlick	11 December 2000 (age 25)	1.93 m	62	287	(Germany) SG Flensburg-Handewitt
49	RW	Frederik Bo Andersen	9 December 1998 (age 27)	1.86 m	5	10	(Germany) HSV Hamburg
59	CB	Mads Svane Knudsen	25 March 2002 (age 24)	1.85 m	2	6	(Denmark) Bjerringbro-Silkeborg Håndbold
63	P	Andreas Magaard	2 August 1998 (age 28)	1.94 m	0	0	(Germany) HSV Hamburg
64	LB	Lasse Kjær Møller	11 June 1996 (age 30)	1.99 m	21	27	(Germany) SG Flensburg-Handewitt

=== Coaching staff ===
Role	Name
Head coach	(Denmark) Nikolaj Jacobsen
Assistant coach	(Denmark) Henrik Møllgaard
Team manager	(Denmark) Keld Vilhelmsen
Goalkeeping coach	(Denmark) Michael Bruun
Doctor	(Denmark) Morten Storgaard
Bodytherapist	(Denmark) Kristoffer Glavind Kjær
Physiotherapist	(Denmark) Anja David Greve

=== List of head coaches ===
- Aksel Pedersen (1938–1961)
- Henry Larsen (1961–1962)
- Steen Pedersen (1962–1964)
- G.B. Petersen (1964–1966)
- Bent Jakobsen (1966–1970)
- Knud Knudsen (1970)
- John Bjørklund (1965–1968)
- Jørgen Gaarskjær (1971–1972)
- Leif Mikkelsen (1976–1987)
- Anders Dahl-Nielsen (1987–1992)
- Ole Andersen (1992–1993)
- Ulf Schefvert (1993–1997)
- Keld Nielsen (1997–1999)
- Leif Mikkelsen (1999–2000)
- Torben Winther (2000–2005)
- Ulrik Wilbek (2005–2014)
- Guðmundur Guðmundsson (2014–2017)
- Nikolaj Jacobsen (2017–)

=== Statistics ===
Still active national team players are highlighted

==== Most capped players ====
Player	Games	Position	Years
Lars Christiansen	338	LW	1992–2012
Hans Lindberg	308	RW	2003–2024
Niklas Landin Jacobsen	283	GK	2008–2024
Mikkel Hansen	276	LB	2007–2024
Lasse Svan Hansen	246	RW	2003–2022
Bo Spellerberg	245	CB	2000–2015
Michael V. Knudsen	244	P	1999–2014
Michael Fenger	234	RW	1982–1993
Erik Veje Rasmussen	233	LB	1980–1993
Henrik Møllgaard	230	D, OB	2006–2025

==== Top scorers ====
Player	Goals	Average	Position	Years
Lars Christiansen	1503	4.45	LW	1992–2012
Mikkel Hansen	1387	5.03	LB	2007–2024
Erik Veje Rasmussen	1015	4.37	LB	1980–1993
Hans Lindberg	809	2.65	RW	2003–2024
Michael V. Knudsen	797	3.27	P	1999–2014
Mathias Gidsel	660	6.23	RB	2020–
Anders Dahl-Nielsen	613	2.92	CB	1973–1984
Christian Hjermind	595	3.50	RW	1994–2005
Nikolaj Jacobsen	584	3.95	LW	1991–2003
Anders Eggert	581	3.63	LW	2003–2017

As of 1 February 2026.

=== Champion squads ===
==== 2008 European Championship ====
Kasper Hvidt, Mikkel Holm Aagaard, Lasse Boesen, Lars T. Jørgensen, Jesper Jensen, Lars Rasmussen, Lars Christiansen, Lars Møller Madsen, Peter Henriksen, Bo Spellerberg, Michael V. Knudsen, Jesper Nøddesbo, Lars Krogh Jeppesen, Kasper Søndergaard, Joachim Boldsen, Hans Lindberg, Kasper Nielsen.

Head coach: Ulrik Wilbek.
All-Star Team Players: Kasper Hvidt (Goalkeeper), Lars Christiansen (Left wing).

==== 2012 European Championship ====
Niklas Landin, Thomas Mogensen, Mads Christiansen, Rasmus Lauge Schmidt, Lars Christiansen, Nikolaj Markussen, Anders Eggert, Bo Spellerberg, Lasse Svan Hansen, Hans Lindberg, Rene Toft Hansen, Marcus Cleverly, Kasper Søndergaard, Henrik Toft Hansen, Mikkel Hansen, Kasper Nielsen.

Head coach: Ulrik Wilbek.
All-Star Team Players: Mikkel Hansen (Left back), Rene Toft Hansen (Pivot).

==== 2016 Olympic Games ====
Niklas Landin Jacobsen, Mads Christiansen, Mads Mensah Larsen, Casper Ulrich Mortensen, Jesper Nøddesbo, Jannick Green, Lasse Svan Hansen, Rene Toft Hansen, Henrik Møllgaard, Kasper Søndergaard, Henrik Toft Hansen, Mikkel Hansen, Morten Olsen, Michael Damgaard.

Head coach: Guðmundur Guðmundsson.
All-Star Team Players: Niklas Landin Jacobsen (Goalkeaper), Mikkel Hansen (Left back, MVP), Lasse Svan Hansen (Right wing).

==== 2019 World Championship ====
Niklas Landin Jacobsen, Magnus Landin Jacobsen, Casper Ulrich Mortensen, Nikolaj Markussen, Rasmus Lauge Schmidt, Anders Zachariassen, Jannick Green, Lasse Svan Hansen, Hans Lindberg, Rene Toft Hansen, Henrik Møllgaard, Mads Mensah Larsen, Henrik Toft Hansen, Mikkel Hansen, Morten Olsen, Jóhan Hansen, Nikolaj Øris Nielsen, Simon Hald.

Head coach: Nikolaj Jacobsen.
All-Star Team Players: Niklas Landin Jacobsen (Goalkeeper), Rasmus Lauge Schmidt (Centre back), Mikkel Hansen (MVP).

==== 2021 World Championship ====
Niklas Landin Jacobsen, Magnus Landin Jacobsen, Magnus Bramming, Emil Jakobsen, Emil Nielsen, Anders Zachariassen, Magnus Saugstrup, Lasse Svan Hansen, Kevin Møller, Henrik Møllgaard, Mads Mensah Larsen, Mikkel Hansen, Morten Olsen, Jóhan Hansen, Lasse Andersson, Nikolaj Øris Nielsen, Jacob Holm, Mathias Gidsel, Simon Hald, Nikolaj Læsø.

Head coach: Nikolaj Jacobsen.
All-Star Team Players: Mikkel Hansen (Left back, MVP), Mathias Gidsel (Right back).

==== 2023 World Championship ====
Niklas Landin Jacobsen, Niclas Kirkeløkke, Magnus Landin Jacobsen, Emil Jakobsen, Rasmus Lauge, Magnus Saugstrup, Hans Lindberg, Mathias Gidsel, Kevin Møller, Henrik Møllgaard, Mads Mensah Larsen, Mikkel Hansen, Lukas Jørgensen, Jóhan Hansen, Michael Damgaard, Jacob Holm, Simon Hald, Simon Pytlick, Mads Hoxer Hangaard, Lasse Møller.

Head coach: Nikolaj Jacobsen.
All-Star Team Players: Simon Pytlick (Left back), Mathias Gidsel (MVP).

==== 2024 Olympic Games ====
Niklas Landin Jacobsen, Niclas Kirkeløkke, Magnus Landin Jacobsen, Emil Jakobsen, Rasmus Lauge, Emil Nielsen, Magnus Saugstrup, Hans Lindberg, Mathias Gidsel, Henrik Møllgaard, Mikkel Hansen, Lukas Jørgensen, Lasse Andersson, Simon Hald, Thomas Sommer Arnoldsen, Simon Pytlick.

Head coach: Nikolaj Jacobsen.
All-Star Team Players: Niklas Landin Jacobsen (Goalkeeper), Simon Pytlick (Left back), Lukas Jørgensen (Pivot), Mathias Gidsel (MVP).

==== 2025 World Championship ====
Niclas Kirkeløkke, Magnus Landin Jacobsen, Emil Jakobsen, Rasmus Lauge, Emil Nielsen, Magnus Saugstrup, Jannick Green, Mathias Gidsel, Kevin Møller, Henrik Møllgaard, Mads Mensah Larsen, Lukas Jørgensen, Jóhan Hansen, Lasse Andersson, Emil Bergholt, Simon Hald, Thomas Arnoldsen, Simon Pytlick, Emil Madsen

Head coach: Nikolaj Jacobsen.
All-Star Team Players: Emil Nielsen (Goalkeeper), Simon Pytlick (Left back), Mathias Gidsel (MVP).

==== 2026 European Championship ====
Niclas Kirkeløkke, Magnus Landin, Emil Jakobsen, Rasmus Lauge, Emil Nielsen, Magnus Saugstrup, Mathias Gidsel, Kevin Møller, Mads Mensah Larsen, Lukas Jørgensen, Jóhan á Plógv Hansen, Lasse Andersson, Emil Bergholt, Simon Hald, Mads Hoxer, Thomas Arnoldsen, Simon Pytlick, Frederik Bo Andersen, Mads Svane Knudsen, Lasse Kjær Møller

Head coach: Nikolaj Jacobsen.
All-Star Team Players: Simon Pytlick (Left back), Mathias Gidsel (MVP).

== Kit suppliers ==
Between 2003 and 2006, Denmark's kits were supplied by Adidas. Since 2007 the kits have been supplied by Puma.

== Sponsors ==
The current sponsor of the Danish Handball Team is Norlys.
