= Handball at the 1952 Summer Olympics =

Field handball was a demonstration sport at the 1952 Summer Olympics. It would become an official sport 20 years later at the 1972 Summer Olympics.

A single match between the men's teams of Sweden and Denmark was held, which Sweden won by 19–11.

== Match ==
| 30 July 1952; 19:45 | Sweden | 19 – 11 | Denmark | Attendance: 13,175; Referees: Siegfried Perrey (FRG); Goal umpires: Martti Pohjola and Lars Sumelius; Linesmen: Jaakko Tuominen and Unto Repo |
| 30 July 1952; 19:45 | | (8–5) | | Attendance: 13,175; Referees: Siegfried Perrey (FRG); Goal umpires: Martti Pohjola and Lars Sumelius; Linesmen: Jaakko Tuominen and Unto Repo |

The match was played in rainy conditions.

== Players ==
All participants were awarded a commemorative medal.

=== Sweden ===
- Rune Nilsson (GK)
- Rolf Zachrisson
- Sven Schönberger
- Åke Norén
- Hans Olsson
- Lars Olsson
- Olle Juthage
- Sten Åkerstedt
- Stig Nilsson
- Evert Sjunnesson
- Rune Lindqvist

=== Denmark ===
- Skjold Bjørn (GK)
- Gustav Volder
- Poul Winge
- Jørgen Larsen
- Erik Christensen
- Viggo Larsen
- Jørn Tillegreen
- Mogens Nielsen
- Svend Aage Madsen
- Poul Rask
- Erik Eigaard
