= Handball at the Summer Olympics =

- IOC Code: HBL
- Governing body: IHF
- Events: 2 (men: 1; women: 1)

Summer Olympics
- 1896; 1900; 1904; 1908; 1912; 1920; 1924; 1928; 1932; 1936; 1948; 1952; 1956; 1960; 1964; 1968; 1972; 1976; 1980; 1984; 1988; 1992; 1996; 2000; 2004; 2008; 2012; 2016; 2020; 2024; 2028; 2032
- Medalists; men; women

Handball at the Summer Olympics refers to two different sports. Field handball was introduced for men at the 1936 Summer Olympics in Berlin, but dropped after that. At the 1952 Olympics, field handball was a demonstration sport. (Indoor) handball was introduced for men at the 1972 Summer Olympics in Munich. Women's handball competition was introduced at the 1976 Summer Olympics in Montreal.

== Men's tournaments ==
=== Summary ===
Year	Host	Gold medal match			Bronze medal match			Teams
Year	Host	Gold medalists	Score	Silver medalists	Bronze medalists	Score	4th-place finishers	Teams
1936; Details	(Nazi Germany); Berlin	Germany	Round robin	Austria	Switzerland	Round robin	Hungary	6
1972; Details	(West Germany); Munich	Yugoslavia	21–16	Czechoslovakia	Romania	19–16	East Germany	16
1976; Details	(Canada); Montreal	Soviet Union	19–15	Romania	Poland	21–18	West Germany	12
1980; Details	(Soviet Union); Moscow	East Germany	23–22 (ET)	Soviet Union	Romania	20–18	Hungary	12
1984; Details	(United States); Los Angeles	Yugoslavia	18–17	West Germany	Romania	23–19	Denmark	12
1988; Details	(South Korea); Seoul	Soviet Union	32–25	South Korea	Yugoslavia	27–23	Hungary	12
1992; Details	(Spain); Barcelona	Unified Team	22–20	Sweden	France	24–20	Iceland	12
1996; Details	(United States); Atlanta	Croatia	27–26	Sweden	Spain	27–25	France	12
2000; Details	(Australia); Sydney	Russia	28–26	Sweden	Spain	26–22	Yugoslavia	12
2004; Details	(Greece); Athens	Croatia	26–24	Germany	Russia	28–26	Hungary	12
2008; Details	(China); Beijing	France	28–23	Iceland	Spain	35–29	Croatia	12
2012; Details	(United Kingdom); London	France	22–21	Sweden	Croatia	33–26	Hungary	12
2016; Details	(Brazil); Rio de Janeiro	Denmark	28–26	France	Germany	31–25	Poland	12
2020; Details	(Japan); Tokyo	France	25–23	Denmark	Spain	33–31	Egypt	12
2024; Details	(France); Paris	Denmark	39–26	Germany	Spain	23–22	Slovenia	12
2028; Details	(United States); Los Angeles							12
2032; Details	(Australia); Brisbane							12

=== Medal table ===
Rank	Nation	Gold	Silver	Bronze	Total
1	France	3	1	1	5
2	Denmark	2	1	0	3
2	Soviet Union	2	1	0	3
4	Croatia	2	0	1	3
4	Yugoslavia	2	0	1	3
6	Germany	1	2	1	4
7	Russia	1	0	1	2
8	East Germany	1	0	0	1
8	Unified Team	1	0	0	1
10	Sweden	0	4	0	4
11	Romania	0	1	3	4
12	Austria	0	1	0	1
12	Czechoslovakia	0	1	0	1
12	Iceland	0	1	0	1
12	South Korea	0	1	0	1
12	West Germany	0	1	0	1
17	Spain	0	0	5	5
18	Poland	0	0	1	1
18	Switzerland	0	0	1	1
Totals (19 entries)		15	15	15	45

=== Participating nations ===
Legend

- 1st – Champions
- 2nd – Runners-up
- 3rd – Third place
- 4th – Fourth place
- • – Did not enter / Did not qualify
- – Hosts
- = – More than one team tied for that rank
- Q – Qualified for forthcoming tournament

Nation	(Germany) 1936	(Germany) 1972	(Canada) 1976	(Soviet Union) 1980	(United States) 1984	(South Korea) 1988	(Spain) 1992	(United States) 1996	(Australia) 2000	(Greece) 2004	(China) 2008	(United Kingdom) 2012	(Brazil) 2016	(Japan) 2020	(France) 2024	(United States) 2028	(Australia) 2032	Years
Algeria	•	•	•	10th	12th	10th	•	10th	•	•	•	•	•	•	•			4
Argentina	•	•	•	•	•	•	•	•	•	•	•	10th	10th	12th	12th			4
Australia	•	•	•	•	•	•	•	•	12th	•	•	•	•	•	•		Q	2
Austria	2nd	•	•	•	•	•	•	•	•	•	•	•	•	•	•			1
Bahrain	•	•	•	•	•	•	•	•	•	•	•	•	•	8th	•			1
Brazil	•	•	•	•	•	•	12th	11th	•	10th	11th	•	7th	10th	•			6
Canada	•	•	11th	•	•	•	•	•	•	•	•	•	•	•	•			1
China	•	•	•	•	•	•	•	•	•	•	12th	•	•	•	•			1
Croatia	Part of Yugoslavia						•	1st	•	1st	4th	3rd	5th	•	9th			6
Cuba	•	•	•	11th	•	•	•	•	11th	•	•	•	•	•	•			2
Denmark	•	13th	8th	9th	4th	•	•	•	•	•	7th	6th	1st	2nd	1st			9
Egypt	•	•	•	•	•	•	11th	6th	7th	12th	10th	•	9th	4th	5th			8
France	•	•	•	•	•	•	3rd	4th	6th	5th	1st	1st	2nd	1st	8th			9
Germany	1st	See GDR and FRG					10th	7th	5th	2nd	9th	•	3rd	6th	2nd			9
Great Britain	•	•	•	•	•	•	•	•	•	•	•	12th	•	•	•			1
Greece	•	•	•	•	•	•	•	•	•	6th	•	•	•	•	•			1
Hungary	4th	8th	6th	4th	•	4th	7th	•	•	4th	•	4th	•	•	10th			9
Iceland	•	12th	•	•	6th	8th	4th	•	•	9th	2nd	5th	•	•	•			7
Japan	•	11th	9th	•	10th	11th	•	•	•	•	•	•	•	11th	11th			6
Kuwait	•	•	•	12th	•	•	•	12th	•	•	•	•	•	•	•			2
Norway	•	9th	•	•	•	•	•	•	•	•	•	•	•	7th	6th			3
Poland	•	10th	3rd	7th	•	•	•	•	•	•	5th	•	4th	•	•			5
Portugal	•	•	•	•	•	•	•	•	•	•	•	•	•	9th	•			1
Qatar	•	•	•	•	•	•	•	•	•	•	•	•	8th	•	•			1
Romania	5th	3rd	2nd	3rd	3rd	•	8th	•	•	•	•	•	•	•	•			6
Russia	See Soviet Union							5th	1st	3rd	6th	•	•	•	•			4
Serbia	See Yugoslavia						See Serbia and Montenegro				•	9th	•	•	•			1
Slovenia	Part of Yugoslavia						•	•	8th	11th	•	•	6th	•	4th			4
South Korea	•	•	•	•	11th	2nd	6th	•	9th	8th	8th	11th	•	•	•			7
Spain	•	15th	•	5th	8th	9th	5th	3rd	3rd	7th	3rd	7th	•	3rd	3rd			12
Sweden	•	7th	•	•	5th	5th	2nd	2nd	2nd	•	•	2nd	11th	5th	7th			10
Switzerland	3rd	•	•	8th	7th	•	•	8th	•	•	•	•	•	•	•			4
Tunisia	•	16th	WD	•	•	•	•	•	10th	•	•	8th	12th	•	•			5
United States	6th	14th	10th	•	9th	12th	•	9th	•	•	•	•	•	•	•	Q		7
Discontinued nations
Czechoslovakia	•	2nd	7th	•	•	6th	9th	See Czech Republic										4
East Germany	G	4th	•	1st	•	7th	See Germany											3
Serbia and Montenegro	See Yugoslavia						•	•	4th	•	See Serbia							1 (Note: Serbia and Montenegro's total includes one appearance as Federal Republic of Yugoslavia in 2000.)
Soviet Union	•	5th	1st	2nd	•	1st	1st	See Russia										5 (Note: Soviet Union's total includes one appearance as Unified Team in 1992.)
West Germany	G	6th	4th	•	2nd	•	See Germany											3
Yugoslavia	•	1st	5th	6th	1st	3rd	See Serbia and Montenegro				See Serbia							5
Total	6	16	12	12	12	12	12	12	12	12	12	12	12	12	12	12	12	

== Women's tournaments ==
=== Summary ===
Year	Host	Gold medal match			Bronze medal match			Teams
Year	Host	Gold medalists	Score	Silver medalists	Bronze medalists	Score	4th-place finishers	Teams
1976; Details	(Canada); Montreal	Soviet Union	Round robin	East Germany	Hungary	Round robin	Romania	6
1980; Details	(Soviet Union); Moscow	Soviet Union	Round robin	Yugoslavia	East Germany	Round robin	Hungary	6
1984; Details	(United States); Los Angeles	Yugoslavia	Round robin	South Korea	China	Round robin	West Germany	6
1988; Details	(South Korea); Seoul	South Korea	Round robin	Norway	Soviet Union	Round robin	Yugoslavia	8
1992; Details	(Spain); Barcelona	South Korea	28–21	Norway	Unified Team	24–20	Germany	8
1996; Details	(United States); Atlanta	Denmark	37–33 (ET)	South Korea	Hungary	20–18	Norway	8
2000; Details	(Australia); Sydney	Denmark	31–27	Hungary	Norway	22–21	South Korea	10
2004; Details	(Greece); Athens	Denmark	34–34 (ET, pen: 4–2)	South Korea	Ukraine	21–18	France	10
2008; Details	(China); Beijing	Norway	34–27	Russia	South Korea	33–28	Hungary	12
2012; Details	(United Kingdom); London	Norway	26–23	Montenegro	Spain	31–29	South Korea	12
2016; Details	(Brazil); Rio de Janeiro	Russia	22–19	France	Norway	36–26	Netherlands	12
2020; Details	(Japan); Tokyo	France	30–25	ROC	Norway	36–19	Sweden	12
2024; Details	(France); Paris	Norway	29–21	France	Denmark	30–25	Sweden	12
2028; Details	(United States); Los Angeles							12
2032; Details	(Australia); Brisbane							12

=== Medal table ===
Rank	Nation	Gold	Silver	Bronze	Total
1	Norway	3	2	3	8
2	Denmark	3	0	1	4
3	South Korea	2	3	1	6
4	Soviet Union	2	0	1	3
5	France	1	2	0	3
6	Russia	1	1	0	2
6	Yugoslavia	1	1	0	2
8	Hungary	0	1	2	3
9	East Germany	0	1	1	2
10	Montenegro	0	1	0	1
10	ROC (ROC)	0	1	0	1
12	China	0	0	1	1
12	Spain	0	0	1	1
12	Ukraine	0	0	1	1
12	Unified Team	0	0	1	1
Totals (15 entries)		13	13	13	39

=== Participating nations ===
Legend

- 1st – Champions
- 2nd – Runners-up
- 3rd – Third place
- 4th – Fourth place
- • – Did not enter / Did not qualify
- – Hosts
- = – More than one team tied for that rank
- Q – Qualified for forthcoming tournament

Nation	(Canada) 1976	(Soviet Union) 1980	(United States) 1984	(South Korea) 1988	(Spain) 1992	(United States) 1996	(Australia) 2000	(Greece) 2004	(China) 2008	(United Kingdom) 2012	(Brazil) 2016	(Japan) 2020	(France) 2024	(United States) 2028	(Australia) 2032	Years
Angola	•	•	•	•	•	7th	9th	9th	12th	10th	8th	10th	9th			8
Argentina	•	•	•	•	•	•	•	•	•	•	12th	•	•			1
Australia	•	•	•	•	•	•	10th	•	•	•	•	•	•		Q	2
Austria	•	•	6th	•	5th	•	5th	•	•	•	•	•	•			3
Brazil	•	•	•	•	•	•	8th	7th	9th	6th	5th	11th	7th			7
Canada	6th	•	•	•	•	•	•	•	•	•	•	•	•			1
China	•	•	3rd	6th	•	5th	•	8th	6th	•	•	•	•			5
Congo	•	6th	•	•	•	•	•	•	•	•	•	•	•			1
Croatia	Part of Yugoslavia				•	•	•	•	•	7th	•	•	•			1
Denmark	•	•	•	•	•	1st	1st	1st	•	9th	•	•	3rd			5
France	•	•	•	•	•	•	6th	4th	5th	5th	2nd	1st	2nd			7
Germany	See GDR and FRG				4th	6th	•	•	11th	•	•	•	8th			4
Great Britain	•	•	•	•	•	•	•	•	•	12th	•	•	•			1
Greece	•	•	•	•	•	•	•	10th	•	•	•	•	•			1
Hungary	3rd	4th	•	•	•	3rd	2nd	5th	4th	•	•	7th	6th			8
Ivory Coast	•	•	•	8th	•	•	•	•	•	•	•	•	•			1
Japan	5th	•	•	•	•	•	•	•	•	•	•	12th	•			2
Kazakhstan	Part of Soviet Union					•	•	•	10th	•	•	•	•			1
Montenegro	Part of Yugoslavia				Part of Serbia and Montenegro				•	2nd	11th	6th	•			3
Netherlands	•	•	•	•	•	•	•	•	•	•	4th	5th	5th			3
Nigeria	•	•	•	•	8th	•	•	•	•	•	•	•	•			1
Norway	•	•	•	2nd	2nd	4th	3rd	•	1st	1st	3rd	3rd	1st			9
Romania	4th	•	•	•	•	•	7th	•	7th	•	9th	•	•			4
Russia	See Soviet Union					•	•	•	2nd	8th	1st	2nd	•			4 (Note: Russia's total includes one appearance as Russian Olympic Committee in 2020.)
Slovenia	Part of Yugoslavia				•	•	•	•	•	•	•	•	11th			1
South Korea	•	•	2nd	1st	1st	2nd	4th	2nd	3rd	4th	10th	8th	10th			11
Spain	•	•	•	•	7th	•	•	6th	•	3rd	6th	9th	12th			6
Sweden	•	•	•	•	•	•	•	•	8th	11th	7th	4th	4th			5
Ukraine	Part of Soviet Union					•	•	3rd	•	•	•	•	•			1
United States	•	•	5th	7th	6th	8th	•	•	•	•	•	•	•	Q		5
Discontinued nations
Czechoslovakia	•	5th	•	5th	•	See Czech Republic										2
East Germany	2nd	3rd	•	•	See Germany											2
Soviet Union	1st	1st	•	3rd	3rd	See Russia										4
West Germany	•	•	4th	•	See Germany											1
Yugoslavia	•	2nd	1st	4th	See Serbia and Montenegro				See Serbia							3
Total	6	6	6	8	8	8	10	10	12	12	12	12	12	12	12	

== Overall medal table ==
The table below include teams under the name they had at the time. When the Soviet Union broke up in 1991 they played one last tournament in 1992 as the Unified Team, which they won for the men and got a bronze medal for the women. Russia is a break-away from the Soviet Union and ROC is Russia under another name. Croatia is a break-away from Yugoslavia, which ceased to exist in 1992. German Democratic Republic and West Germany were created after World War II. They were united into Germany in 1990.

Rank	Nation	Gold	Silver	Bronze	Total
1	Denmark	5	1	1	7
2	France	4	3	1	8
3	Soviet Union	4	1	1	6
4	Norway	3	2	3	8
5	Yugoslavia	3	1	1	5
6	South Korea	2	4	1	7
7	Russia	2	1	1	4
8	Croatia	2	0	1	3
9	Germany	1	2	1	4
10	East Germany	1	1	1	3
11	Unified Team	1	0	1	2
12	Sweden	0	4	0	4
13	Romania	0	1	3	4
14	Hungary	0	1	2	3
15	Austria	0	1	0	1
15	Czechoslovakia	0	1	0	1
15	Iceland	0	1	0	1
15	Montenegro	0	1	0	1
15	ROC (ROC)	0	1	0	1
15	West Germany	0	1	0	1
21	Spain	0	0	6	6
22	China	0	0	1	1
22	Poland	0	0	1	1
22	Switzerland	0	0	1	1
22	Ukraine	0	0	1	1
Totals (25 entries)		28	28	28	84

== See also ==
- List of Olympic venues in handball
