= Blaž Janc =

Slovenian handball player (born 1996)

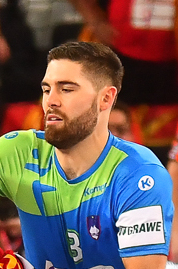
- Janc with Slovenia in 2018

Personal information
- Nationality: Slovenian
- Born: 20 November 1996 (age 29) Brežice, Slovenia
- Height: 1.85 m (6 ft 1 in)

Sport
- Sport: Handball
- Position: Right wing
- Current club: FC Barcelona
- Number: 18

Youth career
- Years: Team
- 2006–2011: RK Sevnica
- 2011–2014: RK Celje

Senior clubs
- Years: Team
- 2012–2017: RK Celje
- 2017–2020: PGE Vive Kielce
- 2020–: FC Barcelona
National team
Years	Team	Apps	(Gls)
2016–	Slovenia	130	(492)
Medal record
World Championship
Bronze medal – third place	2017 France
- Updated on 24 January 2026

Blaž Janc (born 20 November 1996) is a Slovenian professional handball player who plays for FC Barcelona and the Slovenia national team. He is the older brother of fellow handball player Mitja Janc.

He participated at the 2016 Summer Olympics in Rio de Janeiro, in the men's handball tournament.

== Honours ==
- All-Star right wing of the Olympic Games: 2024
