= Daniel Fernández (handballer) =

Spanish handball player (born 2001)

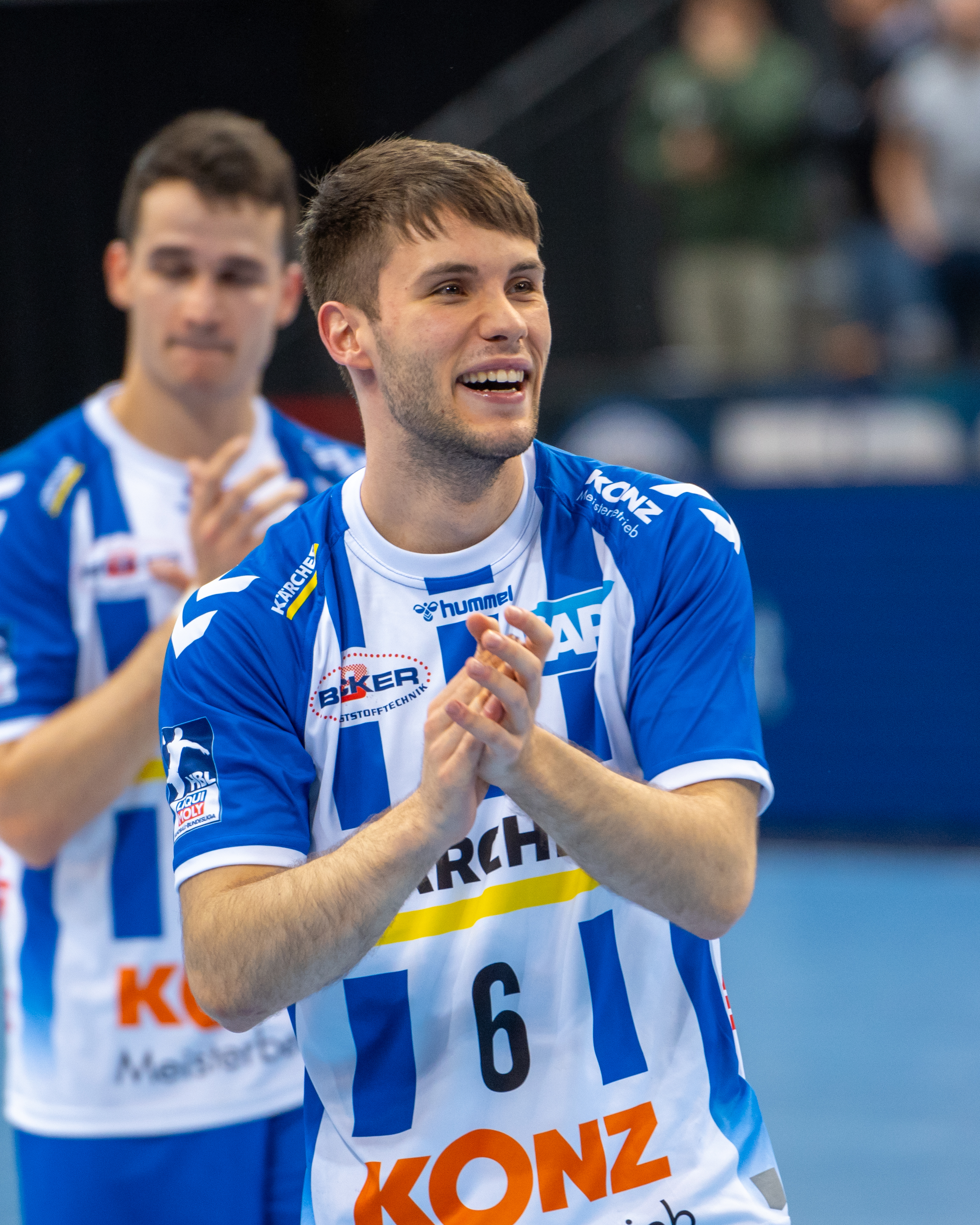
- Fernández in 2024

Personal information
- Full name: Daniel Fernández Jiménez
- Nationality: Spanish
- Born: 28 March 2001 (age 25) Sabadell, Spain
- Height: 1.76 m (5 ft 9 in)

Sport
- Sport: Handball
- Position: Left wing
- Current club: FC Barcelona
- Number: 6

Senior clubs
- Years: Team
- 2017–2020: FC Barcelona B
- 2020–2022: Frigoríficos del Morrazo BM Cangas
- 2022–2025: TVB Stuttgart
- 2025–: FC Barcelona
National team
Years	Team	Apps	(Gls)
2021–	Spain	51	(181)
Medal record
Olympic Games
Bronze medal – third place	2024 Paris	Team
World Championship
Bronze medal – third place	2023 Poland/Sweden
Mediterranean Games
Gold medal – first place	2022 Oran	Team
- Updated on 13 January 2025

Daniel Fernández Jiménez (Note: In this Spanish name, the first or paternal surname is Fernández and the second or maternal family name is Jiménez.) (born 28 March 2001) is a Spanish handball player who plays for TVB Stuttgart and the Spanish national team.

== Club career ==
From the 2017/18 season, Fernández played in the second team of FC Barcelona in the second Spanish league. For the 2020/21 season, the Spanish first division club Frigoríficos Morrazo signed him. For the team from Cangas, the left winger scored 130 goals in 34 games in his first season and was voted into the league's All-Star team. In the 2021/22 season, he improved his rate to 147 goals in 30 appearances and was again named the best left winger.

For the 2022/23 season, Fernández signed a three-year contract with the German Bundesliga club TVB Stuttgart, which was coached by his former coach in Barcelona, Roi Sánchez. He signed a contract with FC Barcelona in March 2024 for the 2025/2026 season.

== International career ==
Fernández made his debut for the Spanish senior national team on 4 November 2021, in 33–29 win against Romania. At the 2022 Mediterranean Games, he won the gold medal with Spain. He took part in a World Championship for the first time in January 2023 in Poland and Sweden. He won the bronze medal with the Spanish squad in the 2023 World Championship.

By January 2024, Tarrafeta had played 31 international matches, in which he scored 101 goals.

== Honours ==
- All-Star left wing of the Olympic Games: 2024
