= Magnus Saugstrup =

Danish handball player (born 1996)

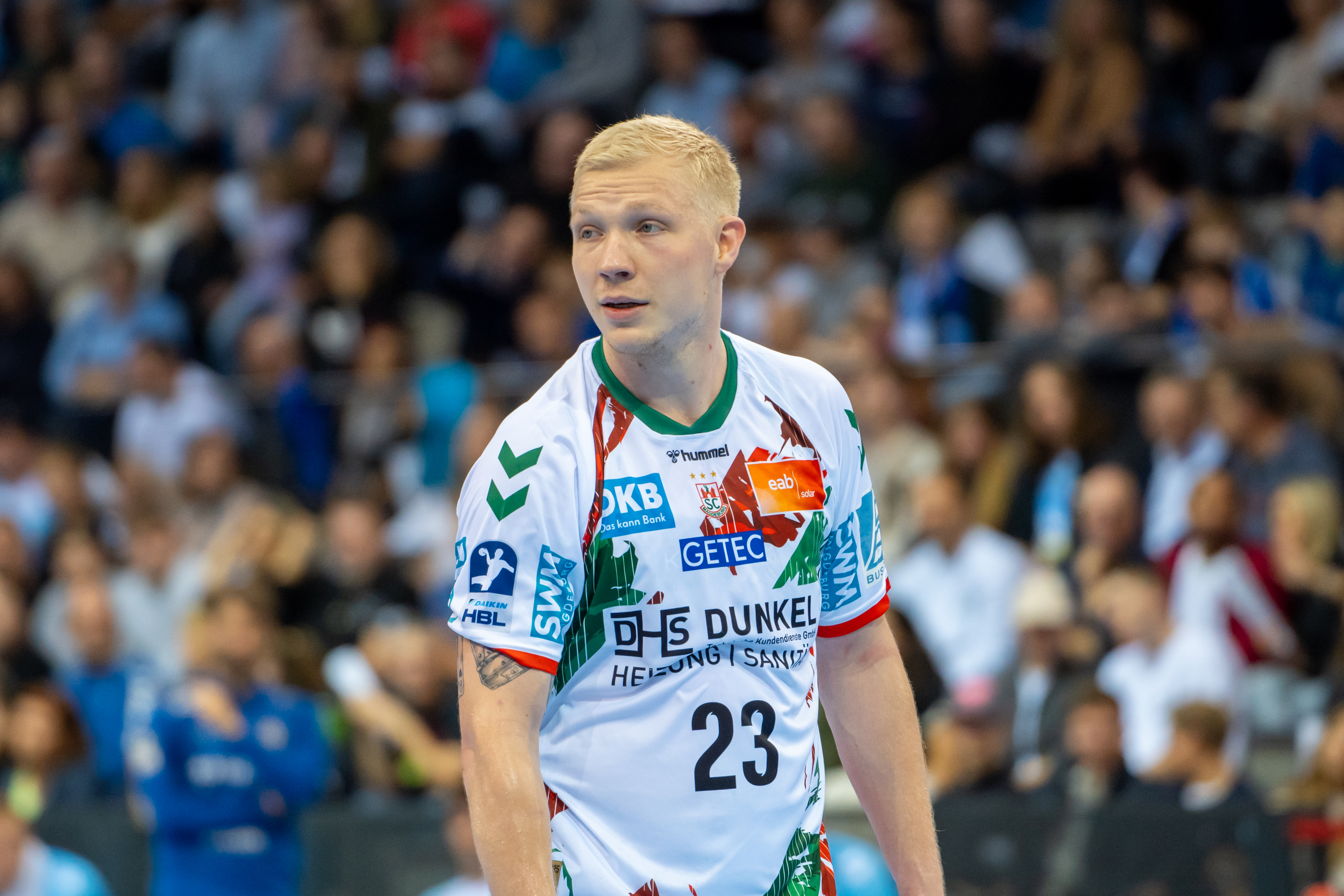

Personal information
- Full name: Magnus Saugstrup Jensen
- Nationality: Danish
- Born: 12 July 1996 (age 30) Aalborg, Denmark
- Height: 1.95 m (6 ft 5 in)

Sport
- Sport: Handball
- Position: Pivot
- Current club: SC Magdeburg
- Number: 23

Youth career
- Years: Team
- –: Nøvling IF

Senior clubs
- Years: Team
- 2014–2021: Aalborg Håndbold
- 2021–: SC Magdeburg
National team
Years	Team	Apps	(Gls)
2018–	Denmark	116	(220)
Medal record
Olympic Games
Gold medal – first place	2024 Paris	Team
Silver medal – second place	2020 Tokyo	Team
World Championship
Gold medal – first place	2021 Egypt
Gold medal – first place	2023 Poland/Sweden
Gold medal – first place	2025 Croatia/Denmark/Norway
European Championship
Gold medal – first place	2026 Denmark/Norway/Sweden
Silver medal – second place	2024 Germany
Bronze medal – third place	2022 Hungary/Slovakia
- Updated on 2 February 2026

Magnus Saugstrup Jensen (born 12 July 1996) is a Danish handball player for SC Magdeburg and the Denmark national team. He is considered one of the best pivots and defensive players of his generation.

== Career ==
Saugstrup started playing handball in his hometown at Nøvling IF. In 2014 he switched to Danish top club Aalborg Håndbold. He won the Danish Championship four times: in 2017, 2019, 2020 and 2021. He also won the Danish Cup in 2018.

For the 2021–22 season he signed a three-year contract with the German club SC Magdeburg. With Magdeburg he won the IHF Super Globe three consecutive times (2021, 2022 and 2023), the German Bundesliga in 2022 and 2024, the EHF Champions League in 2023 and 2025, and the DHB-Pokal in 2024.

=== National team ===
He debuted for the Denmark national team on 7 April 2018 against Iceland. His first major international tournament was the 2020 European Men's Handball Championship. The following year he became a World Champion with Denmark at the 2021 World Men's Handball Championship in Egypt. He won the World Championship for the second time in 2023 and for the third time in 2025.

At the 2024 European Men's Handball Championship he won a silver medal and was selected for the All-star team as the best defensive player.

In November 2024 he became the captain of the Danish national team following Niklas Landin Jacobsen's retirement.

At the 2026 European Men's Handball Championship he won gold medals, meaning that Denmark held both the World, European and Olympic titles at the same time, as only the second team ever after France's 'Les Experts'. During the tournament he did not miss a single shot.

== Outside the court ==
Magnus Saugstrup is the chair person of the Danish labour union for Handball players 'spillerforeningen'.

== Honours ==
Club

- EHF Champions League
  - (gold) 2023, 2025
  - (silver) 2021
- EHF European League
  - (silver) 2022
- IHF Super Globe
  - (gold) 2021, 2022, 2023
- Handball-Bundesliga
  - (gold) 2022, 2024, 2026
- DHB-Pokal
  - (gold) 2024
  - (silver) 2022, 2023
- Danish League
  - (gold) 2017, 2019, 2020, 2021
- Danish Cup
  - (gold) 2018
- Danish Super Cup
  - (gold) 2019, 2020

Individual

- Best defender of the European Championship 2024
- EHF Excellence Awards Defender of the Season: 2024/25
- MVP of the Handball-Bundesliga: 2023/24
