= Lukas Jørgensen =

Danish handball player (born 1999)

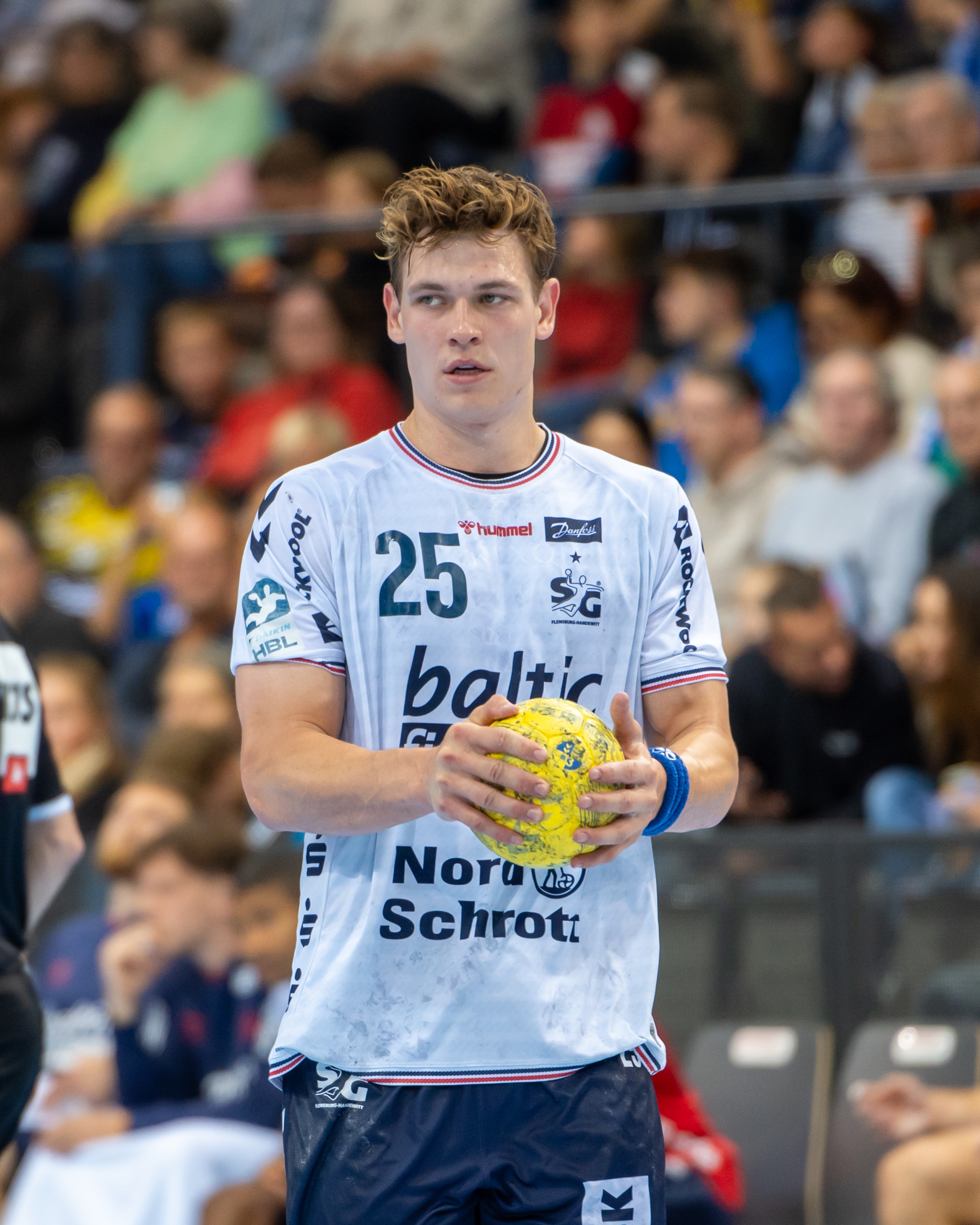
- Jørgensen in 2024

Personal information
- Full name: Lukas Lindhard Jørgensen
- Nationality: Danish
- Born: 31 March 1999 (age 27) Lejre, Denmark
- Height: 1.94 m (6 ft 4 in)

Sport
- Sport: Handball
- Position: Pivot
- Current club: SG Flensburg-Handewitt

Youth career
- Years: Team
- –2015: Roskilde Håndbold
- 2015–2018: GOG Håndbold

Senior clubs
- Years: Team
- 2018–2019: GOG Håndbold
- 2019–2021: Aarhus Håndbold
- 2021–2023: GOG Håndbold
- 2023–2026: SG Flensburg-Handewitt
- 2026–: ONE Veszprém
National team
Years	Team	Apps	(Gls)
2023–	Denmark	30	(88)
Medal record
Olympic Games
Gold medal – first place	2024 Paris	Team
World Championship
Gold medal – first place	2023 Poland/Sweden
Gold medal – first place	2025 Croatia/Denmark/Norway
European Championship
Gold medal – first place	2026 Denmark/Norway/Sweden
Silver medal – second place	2024 Germany
Youth World Championship
Bronze medal – third place	2017 Georgia
- Updated on 29 January 2024

Lukas Lindhard Jørgensen (born 31 March 1999) is a Danish handball player for SG Flensburg-Handewitt and the Danish national team.

== Career ==
Jørgensen started playing handball at his local club Roskilde Håndbold, where he played until he started high school in 2015. From then on he played for GOG Håndbold, where he got his league debut in 2018.

In 2019, he changed clubs to Århus Håndbold. Initially it was a one-year contract, which was extended further 2 years. When that contract was up, he returned to GOG Håndbold when his club Århus Håndbold went bankrupt. Here he won the Danish Championship twice in 2022 and 2023.

For the 2023–24 season he joined German side SG Flensburg-Handewitt. Here he won the EHF European League in both 2024 and 2025.

In July 2025 he announced that he will join Hungarian ONE Veszprém from the 2026–27 season onwards.

=== National team ===
Jørgensen made his debut for the Danish national team against Saudi-Arabia on 5 January 2023. His first major international tournament was the 2023 World Championship, where Denmark won gold modals.

A year later he won silver medals at the 2024 European Championship. He played all 9 games and scored 20 goals.

At the 2024 Olympics he won another gold medal, and was included in the tournament all-star team.

At the 2025 World Championship he won his second world gold. He played 9 games and scored 21 goals.

At the 2026 European Men's Handball Championship he won gold medals, meaning that Denmark held both the World, European and Olympic titles at the same time, as only the second team ever after France's 'Les Experts'. He was however injured in only the second match against Romania.

== Achievements ==
- Danish Handball League:
  - Winner: 2022, 2023
- Danish Handball Cup:
  - Winner: 2022

=== Individual awards ===
- All-Star pivot of the Olympic Games: 2024
- MVP of the Danish Handball Cup Final four 2022
- All-Star Team as Best Pivot Danish League 2022–23
