= 2023–24 REMA 1000-ligaen (men's handball) =

REMA 1000-ligaen
- Season: 2023–24
- Champions: Kolstad
- Relegated: TIF Viking
- All statistics correct as of 11 May 2023.

The 2023–24 REMA 1000-ligaen was the 58th season of REMA 1000-ligaen, Norway's premier handball league. Kolstad won its second straight league title.

== Team information ==
A total of 14 teams will be participating in the 2023/24 edition of REMA 1000-ligaen. 11 teams were qualified directly from the 2022/23 season. TIF Viking and Bergen Håndball from 1. divisjon, was promoted to REMA 1000-ligaen. To determine the last available spot in REMA 1000-ligaen, play-off matches were played between the team that ended 12th in REMA 1000-ligaen's regular season, Haslum HK, and the team who finished 3rd in 1. divisjon, Sandefjord TIF. Haslum HK won series, 2–1, and kept their spot in REMA 1000-ligaen.

Team	Town	Arena	Capacity	Clubs locations in Norway
Bergen Håndball	Bergen	Haukelandshallen	5,000	Clubs locations in Norway
Bækkelaget HE	Oslo	Nordstrand Arena		Clubs locations in Norway
Drammen HK	Drammen	Drammenshallen		Clubs locations in Norway
Elverum Håndball	Elverum	Terningen Arena		Clubs locations in Norway
Fjellhammer IL	Lørenskog	Lørenskoghallen		Clubs locations in Norway
Halden Topphåndball	Halden	Remmenhallen		Clubs locations in Norway
Haslum HK	Bærum	Nadderud Arena		Clubs locations in Norway
Kolstad Håndball	Trondheim	Kolstad Arena	2,500	Clubs locations in Norway
Kristiansand Topphåndball	Kristiansand	Aquarama	2,200	Clubs locations in Norway
Nærbø IL	Nærbø	Sparebanken Vest Arena		Clubs locations in Norway
Runar Sandefjord	Sandefjord	Runarhallen		Clubs locations in Norway
Sandnes HK	Sandnes	Sandneshallen		Clubs locations in Norway
TIF Viking	Bergen	Haukelandshallen	5,000	Clubs locations in Norway
ØIF Arendal Elite	Arendal	Sparebanken Sør Amfi		Clubs locations in Norway

== Regular season ==
=== Standings ===
Pos	Team	Pld	W	D	L	GF	GA	GD	Pts	Qualification or relegation
1	Kolstad	26	24	1	1	909	686	+223	49	Qualification to Playoffs
2	Elverum	26	20	3	3	857	706	+151	43	Qualification to Playoffs
3	ØIF Arendal Elite	26	19	2	5	847	745	+102	40	Qualification to Playoffs
4	Runar Sandefjord	26	16	1	9	855	776	+79	33	Qualification to Playoffs
5	Drammen	26	14	5	7	807	772	+35	33	Qualification to Playoffs
6	Nærbø	26	11	3	12	759	760	−1	25	Qualification to Playoffs
7	Halden Topphåndball	26	12	0	14	701	744	−43	24	Qualification to Playoffs
8	Bergen Håndball	26	11	1	14	775	787	−12	23	Qualification to Playoffs
9	Haslum HK	26	11	1	14	784	819	−35	23	
10	Sandnes HK	26	8	2	16	747	820	−73	18	
11	Bækkelaget HE	26	8	1	17	775	836	−61	17	
12	Kristiansand Topphåndball	26	7	2	17	760	818	−58	16	Qualification for Relegation play-offs
13	Fjellhammer IL	26	7	1	18	720	847	−127	15	Qualification for Relegation play-offs
14	TIF Viking	26	2	1	23	715	895	−180	5	Relegated to 1. divisjon

Updated to match(es) played on 26 August 2023. Source:
Rules for classification: 1.) Points in head-to-head matches amongst tied teams; 2.) Goal difference in head-to-head matches amongst tied teams; 3.) Goals scored in head-to-head matches among tied teams; 4.) Points in all matches; 5.) Goal difference in all matches.

=== Results ===
In the table below the home teams are listed on the left and the away teams along the top.

Home \ Away	BRG	BSK	DHK	ELV	FIL	HTH	HAS	KOL	KRS	NÆR	RUN	SAN	VIK	ØIF
Bergen Håndball		32–24	35–40	20–24	33–21	29–32	36–24	25–32	30–27	30–22	33–32	23–30	32–31	37–36
Bækkelaget Håndball Elite	38–29		28–31	30–31	34–30	28–30	32–38	25–35	35–31	25–28	26–26	22–30	37–29	25–34
Drammen	32–30	35–30		32–32	45–25	25–24	32–32	25–30	28–29	31–31	25–34	29–21	41–27	28–26
Elverum	35–27	37–26	38–31		35–28	32–25	37–26	27–32	27–26	31–31	35–29	37–28	44–22	30–30
Fjellhammer	34–31	25–38	26–27	28–30		22–18	29–35	23–42	30–27	26–25	26–38	36–35	25–25	27–32
Halden Topphåndball	32–31	29–24	21–29	27–30	33–30		30–40	22–30	27–24	27–29	22–31	29–25	31–25	30–33
Haslum	31–29	31–32	30–31	26–36	37–30	29–20		33–40	26–35	34–26	32–37	32–35	34–25	19–32
Kolstad	38–30	42–24	38–25	29–28	37–18	35–22	31–23		33–24	36–28	41–32	31–25	36–25	33–33
Kristiansand Topphåndball	28–30	35–34	29–29	28–36	28–38	31–30	35–22	31–42		28–34	21–26	28–28	36–28	25–35
Nærbø	25–25	35–26	26–33	21–29	33–24	29–30	30–26	21–28	30–23		37–30	30–38	36–24	23–25
Runar Sandefjord	24–31	44–28	35–31	32–34	38–31	28–24	30–31	36–30	38–36	35–30		38–25	39–31	30–35
Sandnes	31–28	30–36	30–30	20–40	38–34	24–30	26–28	25–39	31–29	32–33	27–28		34–29	28–35
TIF Viking	28–29	29–40	33–35	23–34	23–28	22–26	26–33	28–35	38–43	27–31	23–37	30–26		36–33
ØIF Arendal Elite	36–30	30–28	32–27	29–28	30–26	29–30	37–32	28–34	33–23	37–35	31–28	36–25	40–28	

Updated to match(es) played on 26 August 2023. Source:
Legend: Blue = home team win; Yellow = draw; Red = away team win.
