= 2021–22 REMA 1000-ligaen (men's handball) =

Norwegian handball league season

Eliteserien
- Season: 2021–22
- Dates: 31 August 2021 – 11 June 2022
- Champion: Elverum; 3rd title
- Champions League: Elverum
- European League: Drammen; Kolstad
- European Cup: ØIF Arendal; Nærbø IL; Runar Sandefjord
- Matches played: 182
- Goals scored: 10,898 (59.88 per match)
- Top goalscorer: Gabriel Ostad Setterblom (149 goals)

The 2021–22 REMA 1000-ligaen was the 57th season of the REMA 1000-ligaen, the top men's handball league in Norway. A total of fourteen teams contested this season's league, which began on 31 August 2021 and concluded on 11 June 2022.

Elverum won their sixth title.

== Teams ==
Location of teams in 2021–22 REMA 1000-ligaen (Eliteserien)

=== Arenas and locations ===
The following 14 clubs competed in the Eliteserien during the 2021–22 season:

Team	Location	Arena
Bækkelagets	Oslo, Bekkelaget	Bækkelagshallen
Bergen	Bergen	Framohallen
Drammen	Drammen	Drammenshallen
Elverum	Elverum	Terningen Arena
Fjellhammer	Lørenskog	Lørenskoghallen
Halden	Halden	Remmenhallen
Haslum	Haslum	Nadderud Arena
Kolstad	Trondheim	Kolstad Arena
Kristiansand	Kristiansand	Aquarama
Nærbø	Nærbø	Sparebanken Vest Arena
Nøtterøy	Tønsberg	Nøtterøyhallen
ØIF Arendal	Arendal	Sparebanken Sør Amfi
Runar	Sandefjord	Runarhallen
Sandefjord	Sandefjord	Jotunhallen

== Regular season ==
=== League table ===
Pos	Team	Pld	W	D	L	GF	GA	GD	Pts	Qualification or relegation
1	Elverum	26	25	0	1	868	651	+217	50	Qualification to Playoffs
2	Drammen	26	20	1	5	871	712	+159	41	Qualification to Playoffs
3	Runar Sandefjord	26	16	1	9	784	725	+59	33	Qualification to Playoffs
4	Kolstad	26	15	2	9	799	743	+56	32	Qualification to Playoffs
5	Nærbø	27	14	4	9	813	801	+12	32	Qualification to Playoffs
6	ØIF Arendal	26	14	2	10	794	766	+28	30	Qualification to Playoffs
7	Bækkelaget	26	12	1	13	771	807	−36	25	Qualification to Playoffs
8	Halden	26	11	3	12	796	796	0	25	Qualification to Playoffs
9	Fjellhammer	26	10	2	14	703	747	−44	22	Qualification for Relegation play-offs
10	Kristiansand	26	11	0	15	716	772	−56	22	Qualification for Relegation play-offs
11	Haslum	26	8	2	16	726	781	−55	18	Qualification for Relegation play-offs
12	Sandefjord (R)	26	6	4	16	710	810	−100	16	Relegated to 1. divisjon
13	Bergen (R)	26	3	4	19	740	830	−90	10	Relegated to 1. divisjon
14	Nøtterøy (R)	26	4	2	20	735	886	−151	10	Relegated to 1. divisjon

Source: Norwegian Handball Federation (in Norwegian), Flashscore
Rules for classification: 1) points; 2) goals scored; 3) goal difference; 4) head-to-head points; 5) head-to-head goal difference; 6) head-to-head number of goals scored.
(R) Relegated

== Playoffs ==
Quarterfinals were played best-of-three format, semifinals and finals were played best-of-five.

Quarterfinals
1	Elverum	2
7	Bækkelaget	0
4	Kolstad	0
5	Nærbø	2
2	Drammen	2
8	Halden	0
3	Runar Sandefjord	0
6	ØIF Arendal	2

Semifinals
1	Elverum	3
5	Nærbø	0
2	Drammen	1
6	ØIF Arendal	3

Finals
1	Elverum	3
6	ØIF Arendal	1

=== Quarterfinals ===
Team 1	Series	Team 2	Game 1	Game 2	Game 3
Elverum	2–0	Bækkelaget	34–25	38–21	–
Drammen	2–0	Halden	40–24	32–21	–
Runar Sandefjord	0–2	ØIF Arendal	23–30	30–36	–
Kolstad	0–2	Nærbø	26–34	23–29	–

=== Semifinals ===
Team 1	Series	Team 2	Game 1	Game 2	Game 3	Game 4	Game 5
Elverum	3–0	Nærbø	32–26	34–24	40–28	–	–
Drammen	1–3	ØIF Arendal	29–34	31–33	38–30	28–30	–

=== Finals ===
Team 1	Series	Team 2	Game 1	Game 2	Game 3	Game 4	Game 5
Elverum	3–1	ØIF Arendal	32–28	34–29	25–30	34–28	–

==== Game 1 ====
1 June 2022; 19:15	Elverum	32–28	ØIF Arendal	Terningen Arena, Elverum; Attendance: 1,705; Referees: Braseth, Sundet
1 June 2022; 19:15	four players 5	(17–14)	Gjermundsnes 8	Terningen Arena, Elverum; Attendance: 1,705; Referees: Braseth, Sundet
1 June 2022; 19:15	1× (yellow card) 3× (suspension)	Report	1× (yellow card) 3× (suspension) 1× (red card)	Terningen Arena, Elverum; Attendance: 1,705; Referees: Braseth, Sundet

==== Game 2 ====
4 June 2022; 20:15	ØIF Arendal	29–34	Elverum	Sparebanken Sør Amfi, Arendal; Attendance: 2,123; Referees: Johannessen, Larsen
4 June 2022; 20:15	Simonsen 8	(16–19)	Johansson 7	Sparebanken Sør Amfi, Arendal; Attendance: 2,123; Referees: Johannessen, Larsen
4 June 2022; 20:15	1× (suspension) 1× (red card)	Report	1× (yellow card) 2× (suspension) 1× (red card)	Sparebanken Sør Amfi, Arendal; Attendance: 2,123; Referees: Johannessen, Larsen

==== Game 3 ====
8 June 2022; 19:15	Elverum	25–30	ØIF Arendal	Terningen Arena, Elverum; Attendance: 2,027; Referees: Jørum, Kleven
8 June 2022; 19:15	Pettersen, Heldal 6	(13–15)	Børm 7	Terningen Arena, Elverum; Attendance: 2,027; Referees: Jørum, Kleven
8 June 2022; 19:15	1× (yellow card)	Report	3× (suspension)	Terningen Arena, Elverum; Attendance: 2,027; Referees: Jørum, Kleven

==== Game 4 ====
11 June 2022; 19:15	ØIF Arendal	28–34	Elverum	Sparebanken Sør Amfi, Arendal; Attendance: 2,321; Referees: Johannessen, Larsen
11 June 2022; 19:15	Børm 7	(14–17)	Grøndahl 9	Sparebanken Sør Amfi, Arendal; Attendance: 2,321; Referees: Johannessen, Larsen
11 June 2022; 19:15	1× (yellow card) 4× (suspension)	Report	1× (yellow card) 3× (suspension)	Sparebanken Sør Amfi, Arendal; Attendance: 2,321; Referees: Johannessen, Larsen

Elverum won the Finals, 3–1 on series.
