= 2016–17 GRUNDIGligaen =

GRUNDIGligaen
- Season: 2016–17
- Champions: Elverum Håndball (7th title)
- Relegated: Lillestrøm TH; St.Hallvard
- EHF Champions League: Elverum Håndball
- EHF Cup: Bækkelaget HE; ØIF Arendal
- EHF Challenge Cup: FyllingenBergen
- All statistics correct as of 29 July 2017.

The 2016–17 GRUNDIGligaen was the 52nd season of the GRUNDIGligaen, Norwegian's top-tier handball league. A total of twelve teams contest this season's league. Elverum Håndball were the defending champions.

Elverum Håndball defended their title, when they defeated ØIF Arendal in the final 2-1 in matches.

== Format ==
The competition format for the 2016–17 season consists of a home-and-away double round-robin system. The first eight teams qualifies for play-offs, while the last two plays relegation round. The last team of this relegation round is relegated.

== Teams ==
2016–17 GRUNDIGligaen teams

The following 12 clubs compete in the GRUNDIGligaen during the 2016–17 season.

Team	City	bgcolor=ffffe0	Bækkelaget HE	Oslo	Oppsal Arena / Ekeberghallen
Bodø HK	Bodø	Bodø Spektrum			
Drammen HK	Drammen	Drammenshallen			
Elverum Håndball	Elverum	Terningen Arena			
Falk Horten	Horten	Holtanhallen			
FyllingenBergen	Fyllingsdalen	Idrettens Hus			
Halden Topphåndball	Halden	Remmenhallen			
Haslum HK	Bekkestua	Nadderud Arena			
Kolstad	Trondheim	Husebyhallen			
Lillestrøm TH	Lillestrøm	Skedsmohallen			
ØIF Arendal	Arendal	Aquarama			
St.Hallvard	Lier	Reistad Arena			

== Regular season ==
=== Standings ===
Pos	Team	Pld	W	D	L	GF	GA	GD	Pts	Qualification
1	Elverum Håndball	22	20	0	2	653	542	+111	40	Play-offs
2	Bækkelaget HE	22	15	1	6	677	597	+80	31	Play-offs
3	Haslum HK	22	15	1	6	654	604	+50	31	Play-offs
4	ØIF Arendal	22	14	2	6	640	562	+78	28	Play-offs
5	FyllingenBergen	22	12	2	8	666	602	+64	26	Play-offs
6	Bodø HK	22	11	3	8	598	591	+7	25	Play-offs
7	Kolstad	22	10	2	10	576	594	−18	22	Play-offs
8	Drammen HK	22	8	1	13	560	585	−25	15	Play-offs
9	Halden Topphåndball	22	6	2	14	580	640	−60	14	
10	Falk Horten	22	6	0	16	520	613	−93	12	Relegation Round
11	Lillestrøm TH	22	6	0	16	553	634	−81	12	Relegation
12	St.Hallvard	22	2	0	20	523	636	−113	4	Relegation

Source: GRUNDIGligaen

=== Results ===
Home \ Away	BHE	BOD	DRA	ELV	FAL	FYL	HAL	HAS	KOL	LIL	ØIF	STH
Bækkelaget HE		33–28	34–24	27–29	34–19	30–35	38–29	33–28	29–32	28–23	38–30	34–25
Bodø HK	31–25		24–23	24–34	26–23	27–27	34–36	29–25	22–34	26–20	32–22	30–24
Drammen HK	27–29	21–24		20–29	30–23	32–30	29–23	17–34	34–21	30–29	19–27	24–21
Elverum Håndball	23–21	32–30	32–26		26–20	25–26	35–25	26–25	28–22	30–22	28–26	35–28
Falk Horten	21–33	21–26	20–19	21–32		23–35	32–30	23–28	25–24	25–27	21–28	28–16
FyllingenBergen	27–29	27–27	29–26	29–37	31–16		25–21	36–29	29–31	40–24	32–28	30–20
Halden Topphåndball	27–34	25–29	26–26	26–32	28–26	31–27		29–29	29–27	16–25	25–33	29–28
Haslum HK	27–33	27–24	31–27	35–29	33–24	33–32	31–29		25–24	31–24	30–44	32–25
Kolstad	28–28	28–25	27–26	24–29	28–27	19–31	23–21	27–31		19–22	28–28	32–25
Lillestrøm TH	26–31	34–29	27–32	24–29	26–31	29–34	24–21	26–37	22–23		21–37	24–25
ØIF Arendal	34–25	28–28	31–22	20–26	29–23	36–29	26–24	18–25	30–24	29–21		23–20
St.Hallvard	24–31	22–23	14–26	21–27	24–28	29–25	27–30	25–28	28–31	31–33	21–33	

Source: flashscore
Legend: Blue = home team win; Yellow = draw; Red = away team win.

== Play-offs ==
Quarterfinals; 21 March, 5-8 April
1	Elverum Håndball	27	29
8	Drammen HK	22	20
7	Kolstad	37	28	27
3	Haslum HK	29	36	18
4	ØIF Arendal	31	24	30
5	FyllingenBergen	32	23	25
6	Bodø HK	32	32
2	Bækkelaget HE	29	28

Semifinals; 19-23-30 April
1	Elverum Håndball	27	29
7	Kolstad	26	24
4	ØIF Arendal	24	27	29
6	Bodø HK	23	33	25

Finals; 14-18-21 May
1	Elverum Håndball	27	30	25
4	ØIF Arendal	24	29	20

== Relegation round ==
23 April	Sandefjord TIF	27–25	Falk Horten	Jotunhallen, Sandefjord

26 April	Falk Horten	30–24	Sandefjord TIF	Holtanhallen, Horten

Falk Horten won 55-51 aggregate, and stay in Grundigligaen.
