= SC Pick Szeged in European handball =

SC Pick Szeged is a Hungarian handball club, based in Szeged, Hungary.

== European record ==
As of 15 October 2026:

Competition	Seasons	Year(s) in the competition
EHF Champions League	25x	1996/97, 2003/04, 2004/05, 2005/06, 2006/07, 2007/08, 2008/09, 2009/10, 2010/11, 2011/12, 2012/13, 2013/14, 2014/15, 2015/16, 2016/17, 2017/18, 2018/19, 2019/20, 2020/21, 2021/22, 2022/23, 2023/24, 2024/25, 2025/26, 2026/27
EHF European League (EHF/IHF Cup)	11x	1984/85, 1986/87, 1987/88, 1990/91, 1992/93, 1994/95, 1999/00, 2000/01, 2001/02, 2013/14, 2026/27
EHF Challenge Cup (City Cup)	3x	1995/96, 1997/98, 1998/99
EHF Cup Winners' Cup (defunct)	6x	1977/78, 1982/83, 1983/84, 1993/94, 2002/03, 2008/09
Source: kézitörténelem.hu	41 seasons	

== EHF-organised seasonal competitions ==
Szeged score listed first. As of 1 March 2020.

=== Champions League ===
Season	Round	Club	Home	Away	Aggregate
1996–97	Play-off round	(Romania) Steaua București	27-17	23-25	50–42
1996–97	Group stage (Group B)	(Croatia) Badel Zagreb	22-22	29-29	2nd
1996–97	Group stage (Group B)	(Norway) ID Runar Sandefjord	33-23	20-29	2nd
1996–97	Group stage (Group B)	(Italy) Principe Trieste	30-22	29-25	2nd
1996–97	Quarter-finals	(Spain) FC Barcelona	25-26	17-40	42–66
2003–04	Group Matches (Group E)	(Croatia) RK Zagreb	27-26	25-26	2nd
2003–04	Group Matches (Group E)	(Norway) Sandefjord TIF	30-26	24-26	2nd
2003–04	Group Matches (Group E)	(Greece) Filippos Veria	31-26	23-24	2nd
2003–04	Round of 16	(France) Montpellier HB	29-22	26-27	55–49
2003–04	Quarter-finals	(Germany) SC Magdeburg	30-31	24-28	54–59
2004–05	Group stage (Group A)	(Spain) FC Barcelona	22-21	26-35	1st
2004–05	Group stage (Group A)	(North Macedonia) Vardar Vatrost. Skopje	25-18	24-24	1st
2004–05	Group stage (Group A)	(Romania) HCM Constanța	27-24	23-21	1st
2004–05	Round of 16	(Slovenia) Celje Pivovarna Laško	20-21	23-23	43–44
2005–06	Group stage (Group D)	(Spain) FC Barcelona-Cifec	26-28	20-27	2nd
2005–06	Group stage (Group D)	(Ukraine) HC ZTR Zaporizhzhia	36-28	24-22	2nd
2005–06	Group stage (Group D)	(Bosnia and Herzegovina) HRK Izviđač Ljubuški	33-22	22-23	2nd
2005–06	Round of 16	(Spain) BM Ciudad Real	31-32	27-36	58–68
2006–07	Group stage (Group B)	(Spain) BM Ciudad Real	20-25	25-32	2nd
2006–07	Group stage (Group B)	(Switzerland) Kadetten Schaffhausen	27-27	23-22	2nd
2006–07	Group stage (Group B)	(Belarus) HC Meshkov Brest	28-23	30-24	2nd
2006–07	Round of 16	(Spain) CBM Valladolid	25-25	24-25	49–50
2007–08	Group stage (Group H)	(Slovenia) RK Gorenje Velenje	30-23	29-17	1st
2007–08	Group stage (Group H)	(Bosnia and Herzegovina) RK Bosna Sarajevo	39-24	37-24	1st
2007–08	Group stage (Group H)	(Belarus) HC Meshkov Brest	33-24	24-22	1st
2007–08	Main round (Group 4)	(Spain) FC Barcelona	28-33	32-28	3rd
2007–08	Main round (Group 4)	(Denmark) GOG Svendborg TGI Gudme	34-33	25-28	3rd
2007–08	Main round (Group 4)	(Slovenia) Celje Pivovarna Laško	20-19	30-35	3rd
2008–09	Group stage (Group H)	RK Croatia Osiguranje Zagreb	30-36	25-29	3rd CWC
2008–09	Group stage (Group H)	(Poland) Wisła Płock S.A.	26-17	26-16	3rd CWC
2008–09	Group stage (Group H)	(Germany) Rhein-Neckar Löwen	24-28	28-35	3rd CWC
2009–10	Group stage (Group A)	(Russia) Chekhovskiye Medvedi	32-32	30-39	5th
2009–10	Group stage (Group A)	(France) Montpellier HB	26-33	23-30	5th
2009–10	Group stage (Group A)	(Spain) Pevafersa Valladolid	23-30	35-35	5th
2009–10	Group stage (Group A)	(Romania) HCM Constanța	35-25	30-32	5th
2009–10	Group stage (Group A)	(Greece) A.C. PAOK	27-24	26-27	5th
2010–11	Group stage (Group C)	(Russia) Chekhovskiye Medvedi	22-29	26-25	3rd
2010–11	Group stage (Group C)	(Denmark) AaB Håndbold	37-28	30-34	3rd
2010–11	Group stage (Group C)	(Spain) Cuatro Rayas BM Valladolid	30-25	23-26	3rd
2010–11	Group stage (Group C)	(Switzerland) Kadetten Schaffhausen	29-26	27-31	3rd
2010–11	Group stage (Group C)	(Belarus) HC Dinamo-Minsk	37-34	29-33	3rd
2010–11	Round of 16	(Germany) SG Flensburg-Handewitt	26-27	20-33	46–60
2011–12	Group stage (Group D)	(France) Montpellier Agglomération HB	38-35	26-29	5th
2011–12	Group stage (Group D)	(Denmark) AG København	31-34	24-36	5th
2011–12	Group stage (Group D)	(Germany) THW Kiel	26-38	24-34	5th
2011–12	Group stage (Group D)	(Spain) Reale Ademar León	31-35	25-31	5th
2011–12	Group stage (Group D)	(Serbia) RK Partizan Beograd	31-21	29-23	5th
2012–13	Group stage (Group D)	(Spain) FC Barcelona Intersport	28-33	24-33	4th
2012–13	Group stage (Group D)	RK Croatia Osiguranje Zagreb	26-24	27-30	4th
2012–13	Group stage (Group D)	(Switzerland) Kadetten Schaffhausen	30-29	29-36	4th
2012–13	Group stage (Group D)	(Germany) Füchse Berlin	22-29	24-29	4th
2012–13	Group stage (Group D)	(Belarus) HC Dinamo Minsk	26-21	24-29	4th
2012–13	Round of 16	(Poland) KS Vive Targi Kielce	26-25	27-32	53–57
2013–14	Qualification tournament	(North Macedonia) RK Metalurg	23-19	16-26	39–45; EHF
2014–15	Group stage (Group D)	(Poland) KS Vive Targi Kielce	26-27	32-37	2nd
2014–15	Group stage (Group D)	(France) Dunkerque HB Grand Littoral	23-21	25-24	2nd
2014–15	Group stage (Group D)	(Switzerland) Kadetten Schaffhausen	34-24	29-32	2nd
2014–15	Group stage (Group D)	(Denmark) Aalborg Håndbold	23-23	28-25	2nd
2014–15	Group stage (Group D)	(Ukraine) HC Motor Zaporizhzhia	27-26	29-25	2nd
2014–15	Round of 16	(Germany) Rhein-Neckar Löwen	31-29	34-30	65–59
2014–15	Quarter-finals	(Germany) THW Kiel	31-29	23-31	54–60
2015–16	Group stage (Group B)	(Spain) FC Barcelona Lassa	28-30	25-30	5th
2015–16	Group stage (Group B)	(Poland) KS Vive Targi Kielce	31-30	26-27	5th
2015–16	Group stage (Group B)	(North Macedonia) RK Vardar	29-31	23-27	5th
2015–16	Group stage (Group B)	(Denmark) KIF Kolding København	34-23	27-22	5th
2015–16	Group stage (Group B)	(Germany) Rhein-Neckar Löwen	30-24	25-30	5th
2015–16	Group stage (Group B)	(Sweden) IFK Kristianstad	35-28	34-32	5th
2015–16	Group stage (Group B)	(France) Montpellier HB	28-27	29-29	5th
2015–16	Round of 16	(Germany) THW Kiel	33-29	29-36	62–65
2016–17	Group stage (Group B)	(Germany) Rhein-Neckar Löwen	28-28	30-24	3rd
2016–17	Group stage (Group B)	(Poland) KS Vive Targi Kielce	27-29	24-28	3rd
2016–17	Group stage (Group B)	(North Macedonia) RK Vardar	21-23	27-30	3rd
2016–17	Group stage (Group B)	(Croatia) RK Zagreb	26-21	26-24	3rd
2016–17	Group stage (Group B)	(Belarus) HC Meshkov Brest	24-22	23-25	3rd
2016–17	Group stage (Group B)	(Slovenia) RK Celje Pivovarna Laško	27-22	31-25	3rd
2016–17	Group stage (Group B)	(Sweden) IFK Kristianstad	33-28	29-21	3rd
2016–17	Round of 16	(Denmark) Bjerringbro-Silkeborg	33-24	24-26	59–48
2016–17	Quarter-finals	(France) Paris Saint-Germain Handball	27-30	30-30	57–60
2017–18	Group stage (Group A)	(Spain) FC Barcelona Lassa	31-28	27-28	5th
2017–18	Group stage (Group A)	(North Macedonia) RK Vardar	26-26	30-34	5th
2017–18	Group stage (Group A)	(Germany) Rhein-Neckar Löwen	31-34	37-35	5th
2017–18	Group stage (Group A)	(Croatia) RK Zagreb	30-28	28-23	5th
2017–18	Group stage (Group A)	(Poland) Orlen Wisła Płock	24-25	33-27	5th
2017–18	Group stage (Group A)	(Sweden) IFK Kristianstad	36-27	32-33	5th
2017–18	Group stage (Group A)	(France) HBC Nantes	30-33	26-30	5th
2017–18	Round of 16	(Germany) THW Kiel	28-27	22-29	50–56
2018–19	Group stage (Group B)	(France) Paris Saint-Germain HB	33-32	31-33	2nd
2018–19	Group stage (Group B)	(Germany) SG Flensburg-Handewitt	30-28	25-27	2nd
2018–19	Group stage (Group B)	(Denmark) Skjern Håndbold	33-33	29-26	2nd
2018–19	Group stage (Group B)	(Croatia) RK PPD Zagreb	26-26	24-23	2nd
2018–19	Group stage (Group B)	(Ukraine) HC Motor Zaporizhzhia	30-29	32-31	2nd
2018–19	Group stage (Group B)	(Slovenia) RK Celje Pivovarna Laško	33-24	29-28	2nd
2018–19	Group stage (Group B)	(France) HBC Nantes	30-28	26-29	2nd
2018–19	Round of 16	(Poland) Orlen Wisła Płock	23-16	22-20	45–36
2018–19	Quarter-finals	(North Macedonia) RK Vardar	29-25	23-31	52–56
2019–20	Group stage (Group A)	(France) Paris Saint-Germain HB	32-29	25-30	3rd
2019–20	Group stage (Group A)	(Spain) FC Barcelona Lassa	31-28	28-30	3rd
2019–20	Group stage (Group A)	(Germany) SG Flensburg-Handewitt	24-24	26-34	3rd
2019–20	Group stage (Group A)	(Denmark) Aalborg Håndbold	26-26	35-28	3rd
2019–20	Group stage (Group A)	(Croatia) RK PPD Zagreb	33-23	26-21	3rd
2019–20	Group stage (Group A)	(Norway) Elverum Håndball	32-25	26-25	3rd
2019–20	Group stage (Group A)	(Slovenia) RK Celje Pivovarna Laško	31-24	34-23	3rd
2019–20	Round of 16	(North Macedonia) RK Vardar	Canceled		
2020–21	Group stage (Group A)	(Poland) Łomża Vive Kielce	26-30	23-26	6th
2020–21	Group stage (Group A)	(Portugal) FC Porto	35-31	19-25	6th
2020–21	Group stage (Group A)	(Belarus) Meshkov Brest	30-27	24-26	6th
2020–21	Group stage (Group A)	(Norway) Elverum Håndball	36-27	10-0	6th
2020–21	Group stage (Group A)	(Germany) SG Flensburg-Handewitt	0-10	24-26	6th
2020–21	Group stage (Group A)	(France) Paris Saint-Germain HB	29-32	0-10	6th
2020–21	Group stage (Group A)	(North Macedonia) Vardar 1961	34-33	28-26	6th
2020–21	Play-offs	(Germany) THW Kiel	28-33	28-33	56–66
2021–22	Group stage (Group A)	(France) Montpellier Handball	29-29	29-29	3rd
2021–22	Group stage (Group A)	(Croatia) PPD Zagreb	30-21	24-26	3rd
2021–22	Group stage (Group A)	(Belarus) Meshkov Brest	28-26	28-25	3rd
2021–22	Group stage (Group A)	(Norway) Elverum Håndball	30-34	27-24	3rd
2021–22	Group stage (Group A)	(Germany) THW Kiel	30-26	32-32	3rd
2021–22	Group stage (Group A)	(Denmark) Aalborg Håndbold	31-28	30-34	3rd
2021–22	Group stage (Group A)	(North Macedonia) Vardar 1961	34-31	30-27	3rd
2021–22	Playoffs	(Germany) SG Flensburg-Handewitt	36-35	21-25	57–60
2022–23	Group stage (Group B)	(Spain) Barça	28-35	25-35	6th
2022–23	Group stage (Group B)	(France) HBC Nantes	28-28	30-35	6th
2022–23	Group stage (Group B)	(Germany) THW Kiel	36-33	29-34	6th
2022–23	Group stage (Group B)	(Denmark) Aalborg Håndbold	29-41	27-33	6th
2022–23	Group stage (Group B)	(Norway) Elverum Håndball	30-23	34-32	6th
2022–23	Group stage (Group B)	(Poland) Barlinek Industria Kielce	28-31	30-37	6th
2022–23	Group stage (Group B)	(Slovenia) Celje Pivovarna Laško	36-27	36-28	6th
2022–23	Playoffs	(Hungary) Telekom Veszprém	23-36	33-38	56–74
2023–24	Group stage (Group A)	(France) Paris Saint-Germain	29-31	33-37	6th
2023–24	Group stage (Group A)	(Germany) THW Kiel	27-28	32-35	6th
2023–24	Group stage (Group A)	(Denmark) Aalborg Håndbold	34-27	26-31	6th
2023–24	Group stage (Group A)	(Norway) Kolstad Håndball	29-27	24-37	6th
2023–24	Group stage (Group A)	(Poland) Industria Kielce	26-25	27-27	6th
2023–24	Group stage (Group A)	(Croatia) RK Zagreb	27-26	25-30	6th
2023–24	Group stage (Group A)	(North Macedonia) RK Eurofarm Pelister	34-26	28-27	6th
2023–24	Playoffs	(Hungary) Telekom Veszprém	30-37	32-39	62–76
2024–25	Group stage (Group B)	(Germany) SC Magdeburg	31-29	24-31	5th
2024–25	Group stage (Group B)	(Spain) Barça	29-29	30-31	5th
2024–25	Group stage (Group B)	(France) HBC Nantes	33-32	29-32	5th
2024–25	Group stage (Group B)	(Croatia) RK Zagreb	26-27	35-30	5th
2024–25	Group stage (Group B)	(Denmark) Aalborg Håndbold	30-32	28-29	5th
2024–25	Group stage (Group B)	(Norway) Kolstad Håndball	27-29	36-33	5th
2024–25	Group stage (Group B)	(Poland) Industria Kielce	28-27	35-31	5th
2024–25	Playoffs	(France) Paris Saint-Germain	30-31	35-25	65–56
2024–25	Quarterfinals	(Spain) Barça	24-27	30-29	54–56
2025–26	Group stage (Group B)	(Poland) Industria Kielce	33-34	30-30	6th
2025–26	Group stage (Group B)	(Denmark) GOG Håndbold	34-37	36-31	6th
2025–26	Group stage (Group B)	(France) Paris Saint-Germain	31-29	28-29	6th
2025–26	Group stage (Group B)	(Spain) Barça	27-35	28-31	6th
2025–26	Group stage (Group B)	(Germany) SC Magdeburg	30-34	32-40	6th
2025–26	Group stage (Group B)	(Croatia) RK Zagreb	32-26	28-23	6th
2025–26	Group stage (Group B)	(North Macedonia) RK Eurofarm Pelister	35-20	24-25	6th
2025–26	Playoffs	(Poland) Industria Kielce	26-23	32-32	58–55
2025–26	Quarterfinals	(Germany) Füchse Berlin	35-34	30-31	65–65 (3–4 p)
2026–27	Group stage (Group D)	(Sweden) IFK Kristianstad	42-31	31-26	3rd EL
2026–27	Group stage (Group D)	(Denmark) GOG Håndbold	33-33	34-36	3rd EL
2026–27	Group stage (Group D)	(Portugal) Sporting CP	35-35	28-34	3rd EL

=== EHF European League (EHF Cup) ===
Season	Round	Club	Home	Away	Aggregate
1984–85	Quarter-finals	(Spain) Tecnisa Alicante	31-33	24-29	55–62
1986–87	Round of 16	(Czechoslovakia) Dukla Prague	22-21	18-23	40–44
1987–88	First round	(Bulgaria) VIF Dimitrov Sofia	23-28	16-25	39–53
1990–91	First round	(Romania) Minaur Baia Mare	27-21	16-23	43–44
1992–93	First round	(Romania) Steaua București	21-16	21-27	42–43
1994–95	Round of 32	(Cyprus) Grammar School Nicosia	30-17	23-18	53–35
1994–95	Round of 16	(France) Montpellier HB	27-24	20-22	47–46
1994–95	Quarter-finals	(Russia) Polyot Cheljabinsk	27-25	21-23	48–48 (a)
1999–00	Round of 32	(Sweden) Alingsås HK	33-20	24-26	57–46
1999–00	Round of 16	(Norway) Viking HK	31-29	25-27	56–56 (a)
2000–01	Third round	(Turkey) Beşiktaş İstanbul	34-24	35-27	69–51
2000–01	Fourth round	(Russia) CSKA Moscow	26-19	23-28	49–47
2000–01	Quarter-finals	(Spain) Bidasoa Irun	28-27	23-26	51–53
2001–02	Third round	(Spain) BM. Gáldar	33-28	30-36	63–64
2013–14; Winner	Third qualifying round	(Portugal) S.L. Benfica	31-25	25-24	56–49
2013–14; Winner	Group stage (Group C)	(Slovakia) Tatran Prešov	37-31	31-29	1st
2013–14; Winner	Group stage (Group C)	(France) HBC Nantes	28-27	23-31	1st
2013–14; Winner	Group stage (Group C)	(Sweden) IFK Kristianstad	29-18	26-23	1st
2013–14; Winner	Quarter-finals	(Portugal) Sporting CP	28-22	27-29	55–51
2013–14; Winner	Semi-final (F4)	(Germany) Füchse Berlin	24–22		
2013–14; Winner	Final (F4)	(France) Montpellier Agglomération HB	29–28		
2026–27	Play-offs	(To be determined) TBD			–

=== City Cup (Challenge Cup) ===
Season	Round	Club	Home	Away	Aggregate
1995–96	Round of 32	(Turkey) Beşiktaş İstanbul	35-17	30-22	65–39
1995–96	Round of 16	(Germany) TV 08 e.V. Niederwürzbach	29-29	33-31	62–60
1995–96	Quarter-finals	(Croatia) RK Sisak	38-22	27-20	65–42
1995–96	Semi-finals	(Germany) SG Vfl/BHW Hameln	26-27	22-26	48–53
1997–98	Round of 32	(Croatia) RK Metković Razvitak	29-26	18-19	47–45
1997–98	Round of 16	(France) Paris St.-Germain	26-19	19-24	45–43
1997–98	Quarter-finals	(Germany) TuS Nettelstedt e.v.	22-25	26-29	48–54
1998–99	Round of 32	(Belgium) Handballclub Tongeren	33-14	29-18	62–32
1998–99	Round of 16	(Ukraine) CSKA Kyiv	40-14	35-25	75–39
1998–99	Quarter-finals	(Germany) TuS Nettelstedt e.v.	25-28	29-28	54–56

=== Cup Winners' Cup ===
From the 2012–13 season, the men's competition was merged with the EHF Cup.

Season	Round	Club	Home	Away	Aggregate
1977–78	Round of 16	(Spain) FC Barcelona	27-22	13-15	40–37
1977–78	Quarter-finals	(Poland) Anilana Łódź	26-22	20-25	46–47
1982–83	Round of 16	(Denmark) KFUM Fredericia	27-16	29-27	56–43
1982–83	Quarter-finals	(East Germany) SC Leipzig	27-19	25-29	52–48
1982–83	Semi-finals	(Soviet Union) SKA Minsk	25-24	19-37	44–61
1983–84	Round of 16	(Czechoslovakia) VSŽ Košice	30-23	27-32	57–55
1983–84	Quarter-finals	(Denmark) Helsingør IF	31-21	23-25	54–46
1983–84	Semi-finals	(Socialist Federal Republic of Yugoslavia) RK Sloga Doboj	24-26	26-25	50–51
1993–94	Round of 32	(Ukraine) Swetotechnik Brovary	30-17	17-29	47–46
1993–94	Round of 16	(Finland) BK 46 Karis	31-24	21-23	52–47
1993–94	Quarter-finals	(Iceland) Selfoss	30-18	20-32	50–50 (a)
1993–94	Semi-finals	(Spain) FC Barcelona	22-24	14-19	36–43
2002–03	Third round	(Netherlands) De Groot Groep E&O	31-21	31-26	62–47
2002–03	Fourth round	(Slovakia) Tatran Prešov	36-22	30-25	66–47
2002–03	Quarter-finals	(Germany) TBV Lemgo	30-34	32-40	62–74
2008–09	Round of 16	(Hungary) Dunaferr SE	28-19	29-33	57–52
2008–09	Quarter-finals	(Germany) HSG Nordhorn	31-26	25-34	56–60
