= Erlend Mamelund =

Norwegian handball player (born 1984)

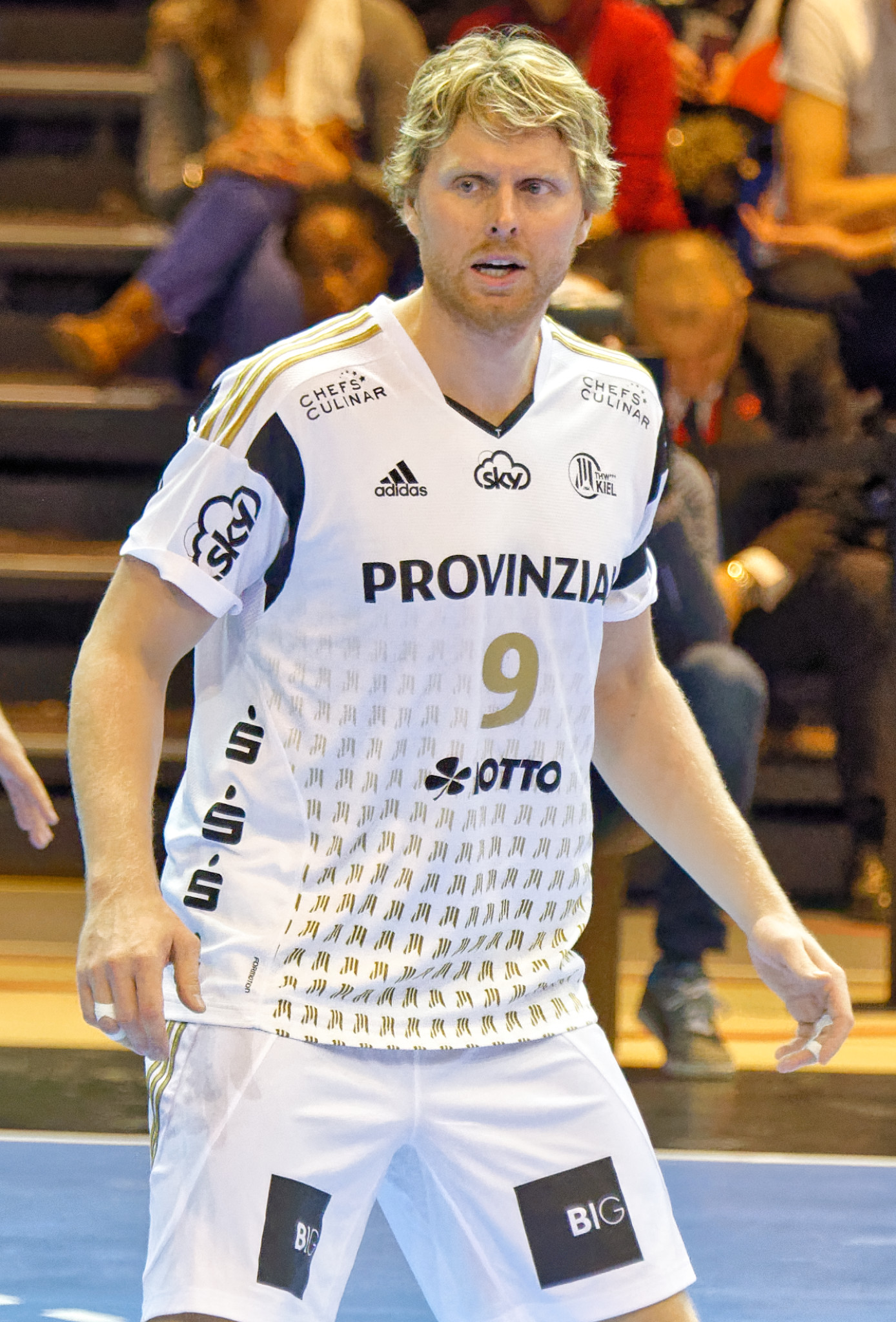

Personal information
- Nationality: Norwegian
- Born: 1 May 1984 (age 42) Bærum, Norway
- Height: 1.97 m (6 ft 6 in)

Sport
- Sport: Handball
- Position: Left back
- Current club: Haslum HK
- Number: 11

Youth career
- Years: Team
- –2001: Helset

Senior clubs
- Years: Team
- 2001–2007: Haslum HK
- 2007–2009: HSG Nordhorn
- 2009: SG Flensburg-Handewitt
- 2009–2010: FCK Håndbold
- 2010–2012: Haslum HK
- 2012–2013: Montpellier HB
- 2013–2015: Haslum HK
- 2015–2016: THW Kiel
- 2016–2017: Haslum HK
National team
Years	Team	Apps	(Gls)
2005–2016	Norway	132	(353)

Erlend Mamelund (born 1 May 1984) is a retired Norwegian handball player who played for the Norwegian club Haslum HK, in the German Bundesliga, and in Denmark an France, as well for the Norwegian national team. His achievements include winning the EHF Cup with HSG Nordhorn in 2008, several national titles in Norway, and one national title in Denmark.

== Club career ==
Mamelund played handball for the club Helset IF as youth player, and started his senior career for Haslum HK from 2001 to 2007. He won his first national title in 2004, when Haslum won the Norwegian Men's Handball Cup. He played professionally in the German Bundesliga from 2007, and won the EHF Cup with HSG Nordhorn in 2007-08. In 2009 he played for the German club SG Flensburg-Handewitt.

Mamelund signed a transfer to the Danish Handball League side FCK Håndbold, which came to be his club from July 2009. In his first season, he won the Danish Men's Handball Cup and was named MVP for the tournament.

He played for Haslum HK from 2010 to 2012. With this club he won the Norwegian cup in 2010 and 2011, and the Norwegian top league in 2011. He was also top scorer in the Norwegian league in 2011. In the 2012/2013 season he played for the French club Montpellier HB. Playing for Haslum HK again from 2013 to 2016, he won the Norwegian league in 2014.

On 19 August 2015 it was announced that Erlend Mamelund would join German side THW Kiel immediately on a one-year deal. He then finished his career at Haslum HK in 2017. He wore the Haslum jersey 311 times and scored 1811 goals in 13 seasons. He then signed a three-year deal as the assistant coach of Haslum from 2017 to 2020.

== International career ==
Mamelund made his debut on the Norwegian national handball team in 2005.

He played a total of 137 matches for the national team, and scored 354 goals. His best international achievement is probably placing fourth at the 2016 European Men's Handball Championship.

== Awards and recognitions ==
Mamelund was awarded the Håndballstatuetten trophy from the Norwegian Handball Federation in 2021.

== Personal life ==
Mamelund was born in Bærum on 1 May 1984. His older brother Håvard and younger sister Linn Therese both played handball in the highest league in Norway. He is married to Karoline Mamelund.
