= Norwegian Men's Handball Cup =

- Founded: 1939 (outdoors); 1958 (indoors)
- Region: Norway
- Current champions: Kolstad Håndball (2023/2024)
- Most championships: Fredensborg BK (15 titles)
- Website: handball.no
- 2023/24

The Norwegian Men's Handball Cup (Norwegian: NM (Norgesmesterskapet)), is the main domestic cup tournament for Norwegian men's handball clubs, which is organised and supervised by the Norwegian Handball Federation. The competition has been played annually since 1946. Fredensborg BK is the most successful team with 15 titles. Between 1939 and 1974 there was also an outdoor competition besides indoor.

Since the 2022/23 edition the semifinals and finals are being played in a Final 8 format, where men's final 4 teams play during the same weekend in the same arena.

== Finals ==
=== Outdoors ===
Year	Winners	Score	Runners-up
1939	SK Arild (1)	6–5	Nordstrand IF
1940	Nordstrand IF (1)	9–6	Grane
1946	Mode (1)	4–2	Nordstrand IF
1947	Oslo HK (1)	10–2	Nordstrand IF
1948	Oslo HK (2)	9–7	Mode
1949	SK Arild (2)	4–2	Nordstrand IF
1950	SK Arild (3)	4–3	Oslo HK
1951	SK Arild (4)	10–7	Oslo IL
1952	Nordstrand IF (2)	8–7	Mode
1953	Nordstrand IF (3)	11–3	Gamlebyen
1954	Oslo HK (3)	9–5	SK Arild
1955	Oslo HK (4)	13–5	Støa
1956	Oslo IL (1)	19–7	Støa
1957	Oslo IL (2)	13–9	Grønland IF
1958	Oslo IL (3)	16–10	Nordstrand IF
1959	Fredensborg BK (1)	19–10	Nordstrand IF
1960	Fredensborg BK (2)	18–14	Nordstrand IF
1961	Fredensborg BK (3)	20–15	Rjukan
1962	Grønland IF (1)	18–11	Elverum Håndball
1963	Nordstrand IF (4)	17–13	Grønland IF
1964	Oppsal Håndball (1)	15–10	Rjukan
1965	Fredensborg BK (4)	16–14	Rjukan
1966	Fredensborg BK (5)	16–9	SK Arild
1967	Oslo Studentene (1)	15–13	Rjukan
1968	Oslo Studentene (2)	23–10	Fredensborg BK
1969	Stabæk Håndball (1)	18–15	SK Njård
1970	Fredensborg BK (6)	17–10	Nordstrand IF
1971	Bækkelagets SK (1)	16–3	Oppsal Håndball
1972	Fredensborg BK (7)	15–10	Oppsal Håndball
1973	Oppsal Håndball (2)	23–14	Bækkelagets SK
1974	Fredensborg BK (8)	13–12	Refstad IL

=== Indoors ===
Note that the year the title counts for has been changing during the years, sometimes being by what year the cup started and sometimes by season.

*	Match went to extra time	**	Match went to penalty shootout

Year	Winners	Score	Runners-up
1958	SK Arild (5)	20–9	Nordstrand IF
1959	Fredensborg BK (9)	11–7	SK Arild
1960	Nordstrand IF (5)	11–7	Fredensborg BK
1961	Nordstrand IF (6)	21–17	Grønland IF
1962	Fredensborg BK (10)	24–10	Grønland IF
1963	Grønland IF (2)	16–15	Elverum Håndball
1964	SK Arild (6)	15–14	Oppsal Håndball
1965	Fredensborg BK (11)	19–11	Elverum Håndball
1966	Fredensborg BK (12)	18–15	Oslo Studentene
1976/77	Refstad IL (1)	15–11	Stavanger IF
1977/78	Fjellhammer IL (1)	16–15	Fredensborg BK
1978/79	Fjellhammer IL (2)	19–17	Kolbotn IL
1979/80	SK Rapp (1)	13–11	Nordstrand IF
1980/81	Kristiansands IF (1)	20–18	Refstad IL
1981/82	Fredensborg BK (13)	22–17	Stavanger IF
1982/83	Fredensborg BK (14)	28–18	Fjellhammer IL
1983/84	Fjellhammer IL (3)	14–13	SK Rapp
1984/85	Fredensborg BK (15)	20–19	Skiens BK
1985/86	Stavanger IF (1)	19–13	SK Rapp
1986/87	IF Urædd (1)	21–16	Kragerø IF
1987/88	IF Urædd (2)	19–18	Stavanger IF
1988/89	Viking HK (1)	21–17	Stavanger IF
1989/90	Sandefjord (1)	26–25	Kragerø IF
1990/91	Sandefjord (2)	24–18	Runar Håndball
1991/92	Stavanger IF (2)	21–20	Runar Håndball
1992/93	Runar Håndball (1)	26–16	Viking HK
1993/94	Sandefjord (3)	25–14	Fyllingen Håndball
1994/95	Viking HK (2)	28–25	Kragerø IF
1995/96	Runar Håndball (2)	29–22	Viking HK
1996/97	Viking HK (3)	36–35	Runar Håndball
1997/98	Runar Håndball (3)	18–17	Sandefjord
1998/99	Sandefjord (4)	26–18	Drammen HK
1999/00	Viking HK (4)	24–21	Drammen HK
2000/01	Sandefjord (5)	22–20	Runar Håndball
2001/02	Sandefjord (6)	35–26	Stavanger IF
2002/03	Sandefjord (7)	29–26	Runar Håndball
2003/04	Sandefjord (8)	32–23	Haslum HK
2004/05	Haslum HK (1)	29–25	Runar Håndball
2005/06	Sandefjord (9)	30–20	Haslum HK
2006/07	Sandefjord (10)	27–26	Haugaland HK
2007/08	Drammen HK (1)	33–24	Fyllingen Håndball
2008/09	Runar Håndball (4)	27–24	Elverum Håndball
2009/10	Elverum Håndball (1)	25–24	Drammen HK
2010	Haslum HK (2)	24–20	Follo HK
2011	Haslum HK (3)	38–28	Drammen HK
2012	FyllingenBergen (1)	22–19	Elverum Håndball
2013	FyllingenBergen (2)	33–23	Bækkelagets SK
2014	ØIF Arendal (1)	23–22	Bodø HK
2015	Bodø HK (1)	23–21	FyllingenBergen
2016	Haslum HK (4)	28–26	Elverum Håndball
2017	Drammen HK (2)	28–23	Bodø HK
2018	Elverum Håndball (2)	30–22	Halden
2019	Elverum Håndball (3)	35–33	Haslum HK
2020	Elverum Håndball (4)	37–29	Nærbø IL
2021	Elverum Håndball (5)	35–32	ØIF Arendal
2022/23	Kolstad Håndball (1)	34–27	Elverum Håndball
2023/24	Kolstad Håndball (2)	27–23	Elverum Håndball
2024	Kolstad Håndball (3)	28–27	Elverum Håndball
2025	Runar (5)	29–29 (5–4, a.p.so.)	Kolstad Håndball
