= Bjarte Myrhol =

Norwegian handball player (born 1982)

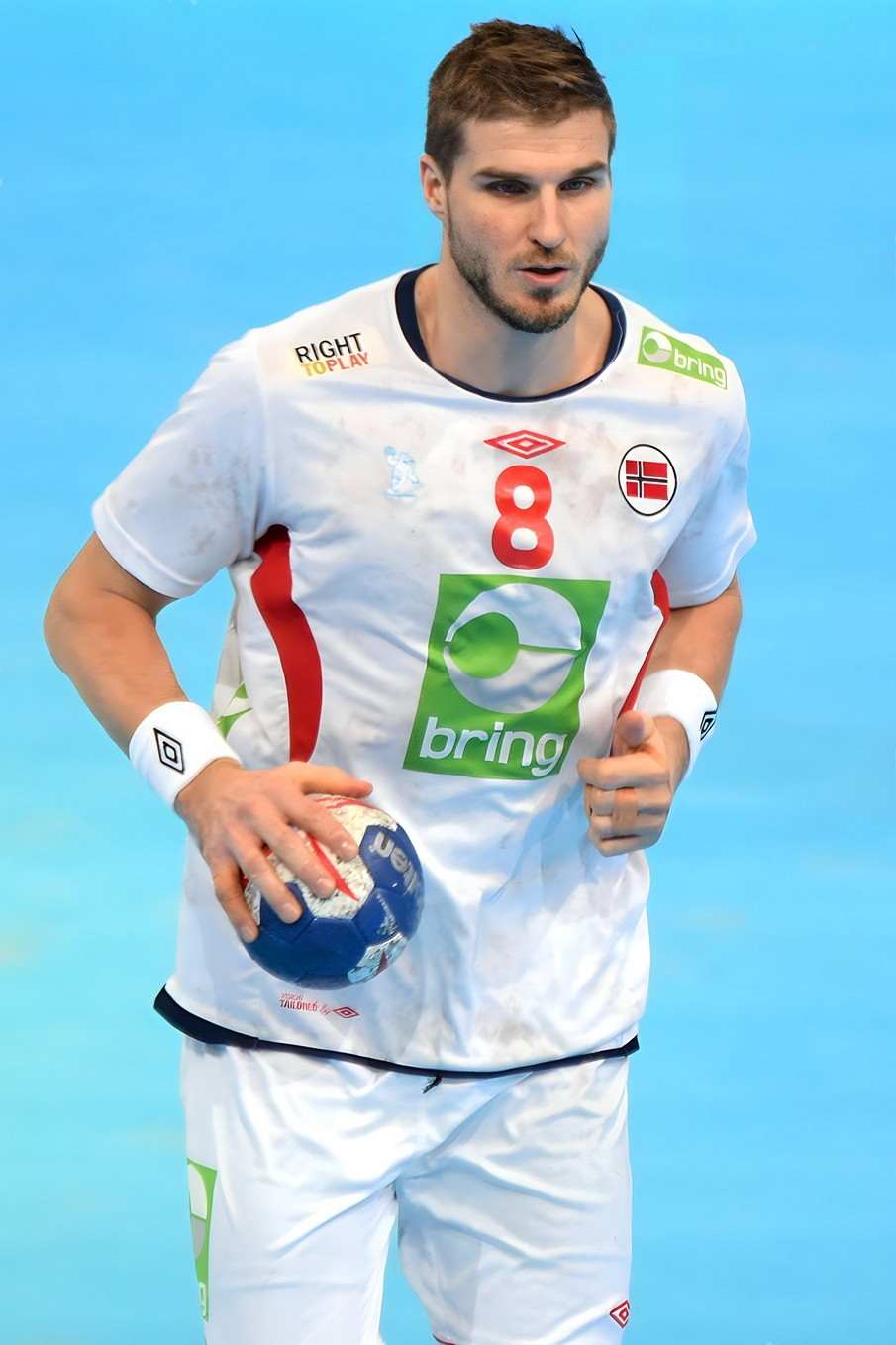
- Myrhol in January 2016

Personal information
- Full name: Bjarte Håkon Myrhol
- Nationality: Norwegian
- Born: 29 May 1982 (age 44) Oslo, Norway
- Height: 1.92 m (6 ft 4 in)

Sport
- Sport: Handball
- Position: Pivot

Youth career
- Years: Team
- –: Vestli IL

Senior clubs
- Years: Team
- –2001: Vestli IL
- 2001–2005: Sandefjord
- 2005–2006: MKB Veszprém
- 2006–2009: HSG Nordhorn
- 2009–2015: Rhein-Neckar Löwen
- 2015–2021: Skjern Håndbold
- 2022: THW Kiel
National team
Years	Team	Apps	(Gls)
2002–2021	Norway	263	(803)

Teams managed
- 2024–2026: Runar Sandefjord
Medal record
World Championship
Silver medal – second place	2017 France
Silver medal – second place	2019 Germany/Denmark

Bjarte Håkon Myrhol (born 29 May 1982) is a Norwegian handball coach and former player. Regarded as one of the best line players of his era, Myrhol won twelve titles playing for clubs in Norway, Hungary, Germany and Denmark in a career that spanned over twenty years.

Myrhol made his debut for the Norwegian national team in 2002, and was the captain of the team from 2014 and until his retirement in 2021. He earned silver medals with the national team at the World Championships in 2017 and 2019, and was voted best pivot at both tournaments. Myrhol holds the record for most appearances for the Norwegian national team with 263 caps, and represented Norway at six World Championships, seven European Championships and the 2020 Summer Olympics.

At the end of Myrhol's contract with Rhein-Neckar Löwen in 2015, his jersey number 18 was retired by the club. He was inducted into the European Handball Hall of Fame in 2023.

== Honours ==
=== Club ===
Sandefjord

- Norwegian Championship: 2002, 2003, 2004, 2005
- Norwegian Cup: 2002, 2003, 2004

MKB Veszprém

- Hungarian Championship: 2006

HSG Nordhorn

- EHF Cup: 2008

Rhein-Neckar Löwen

- EHF Cup: 2013

Skjern Håndbold

- Danish Championship: 2018
- Danish Handball Cup: 2016

=== Individual ===
- Norwegian Championship Player of the Year: 2005
- All-Star Line player of the Danish Championship: 2017, 2018
- All-Star Pivot of the World Championship: 2017, 2019
- EHF Hall of Fame in 2023.
- Håndballstatuetten 2026
