= Magnus Søndenå =

Norwegian handball player (born 1991)

Personal information
- Nationality: Norwegian
- Born: 9 October 1991 (age 35) Sandefjord, Norway
- Height: 1.84 m (6 ft 0 in)

Sport
- Sport: Handball
- Position: Right back
- Current club: Kolstad Håndball
- Number: 10

Senior clubs
- Years: Team
- 2015–2018: Haslum HK
- 2018–2021: Ribe-Esbjerg HH
- 2021–2023: ØIF Arendal
- 2023–2024: Elverum Håndball
- 2024–: Kolstad Håndball
National team
Years	Team	Apps	(Gls)
2016–	Norway	17	(40)

Magnus Søndenå (born 9 October 1991) is a Norwegian handball player for Kolstad Håndball and the Norwegian national team.

From the 2024/2025 season, he is playing for Kolstad Håndball, which is the arch-rival of his former club Elverum Håndball.
