= Mario Matic =

Norwegian handball player (born 1994)

Personal information
- Nationality: Norwegian
- Born: 23 July 1994 (age 32) Stavanger, Norway
- Height: 1.91 m (6 ft 3 in)

Sport
- Sport: Handball
- Position: Centre back
- Current club: Elverum Håndball
- Number: 4

Senior clubs
- Years: Team
- 2012–2014: Runar Sandefjord
- 2014–2015: Sandnes HK
- 2015–2016: Stord IL
- 2016–2019: FyllingenBergen
- 2019–2024: ØIF Arendal
- 2024–2025: AEK Athens
- 2025–: Elverum Håndball
National team
Years	Team	Apps	(Gls)
2022–	Norway	22	(36)

Mario Matic (born 23 July 1994) is a Norwegian handball player for Elverum Håndball and the Norwegian national team.

On 17 December 2024, he was selected to represent Norway at the 2025 World Men's Handball Championship.

== Career ==
Matic has played for several Norwegian clubs, including five years at ØIF Arendal.
