= Geir Daniel Larsen =

Norwegian handball player (born 1974)

Personal information
- Nationality: Norwegian
- Born: 16 April 1974 (age 52)

Sport
- Sport: Handball
National team
Years	Team	Apps	(Gls)
1996–2002	Norway	33	(47)

Geir Daniel Larsen (born 16 April 1974) is a Norwegian handball player.

He hails from Narvik and played for Narvik until 1993, then Bodø HK from 1993 to 1996, Toulouse, Bodø HK again from 1998 to 2001, then Bjerringbro, Runar, Ringsted and finally Bodø for a third period from 2006.

He was capped 33 times for Norway between 1996 and 2002.

After retiring he worked with handball administration and at the Norwegian School of Elite Sport in Bodø.
