= Furuseth =

Furuseth is a surname. Notable people with the surname include:

- Andrew Furuseth (born 1854), American labor leader
- Else Kåss Furuseth (born 1980), Norwegian comedian
- Henrik Furuseth (born 1996), Norwegian racing driver
- Ole Kristian Furuseth (born 1967), Norwegian alpine skier
- Petter Furuseth (born 1978), Norwegian soccer player
- Per Otto Furuseth (born 1947), Norwegian team handball player and coach
- Rolf Furuseth (1915–1984), Norwegian politician
