= August Pedersen =

Norwegian handball player (born 1994)

August Baskår Pedersen

Personal information
- Nationality: Norwegian
- Born: 24 June 1994 (age 32) Notodden, Norway
- Height: 1.81 m (5 ft 11 in)

Sport
- Sport: Handball
- Position: Left wing
- Current club: TSV Hannover-Burgdorf
- Number: 17

Senior clubs
- Years: Team
- 2011–2016: Haslum HK
- 2016–2018: ØIF Arendal
- 2018–2021: Bjerringbro-Silkeborg
- 2021–2022: Drammen HK
- 2022–2025: SG Flensburg-Handewitt
- 2025–: TSV Hannover-Burgdorf
National team
Years	Team	Apps	(Gls)
2023–	Norway	33	(134)

August Baskår Pedersen (born 24 June 1994) is a Norwegian handball player for TSV Hannover-Burgdorf and the Norwegian national team.

On 21 March 2026, Pedersen became historic, when he equaled the scoring record scoring 19 goals in one single match for the national team (against Netherlands). The record was sat by Kjetil Strand at the 2006 European Men's Handball Championship (against Iceland).

Pedersen hails from Notodden Municipality. He has played for Haslum HK, ØIF Arendal, Bjerringbro-Silkeborg and Drammen HK. In 2022 Pedersen joined 2013-14 EHF Champions League winners SG Flensburg-Handewitt from Drammen HK as a replacement for Hampus Wanne.

== Individual awards ==
- All-Star Left Wing of the European Championship: 2026
