= Svenn Erik Medhus =

Norwegian handball player (born 1982)

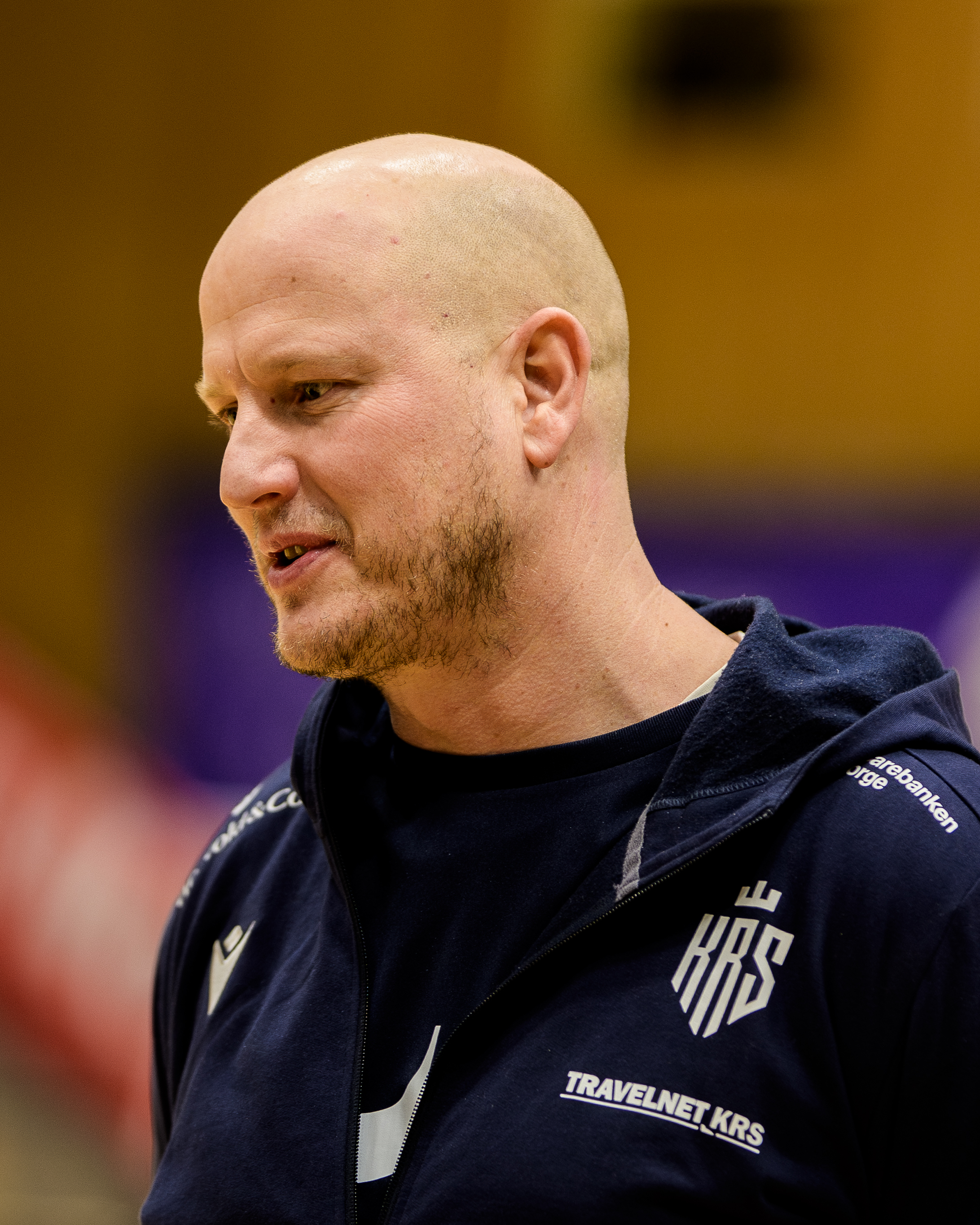
- On the coaching staff for KRS Topphåndball 2026

Personal information
- Nationality: Norwegian
- Born: 22 June 1982 (age 44) Kristiansand, Norway
- Height: 198 cm (78 in)

Sport
- Sport: Handball
- Position: Goalkeeper

Youth career
- Years: Team
- –: Randesund
- –: Kristiansand IF

Senior clubs
- Years: Team
- 2001–2007: Kristiansand IF
- 2007–2008: Sandefjord TIF
- 2008–2010: GWD Minden
- 2010–: ØIF Arendal
National team
Years	Team	Apps	(Gls)
2007–2012	Norway	46	(0)

Svenn Erik Medhus (born 22 June 1982) is a Norwegian handball player.

He made his debut on the Norwegian national team in 2007, and played 81 matches for the national team between 2007 and 2012. He competed at the 2009 World Men's Handball Championship in Croatia.
