= Per Otto Furuseth =

Norwegian handball player and coach (born 1947)

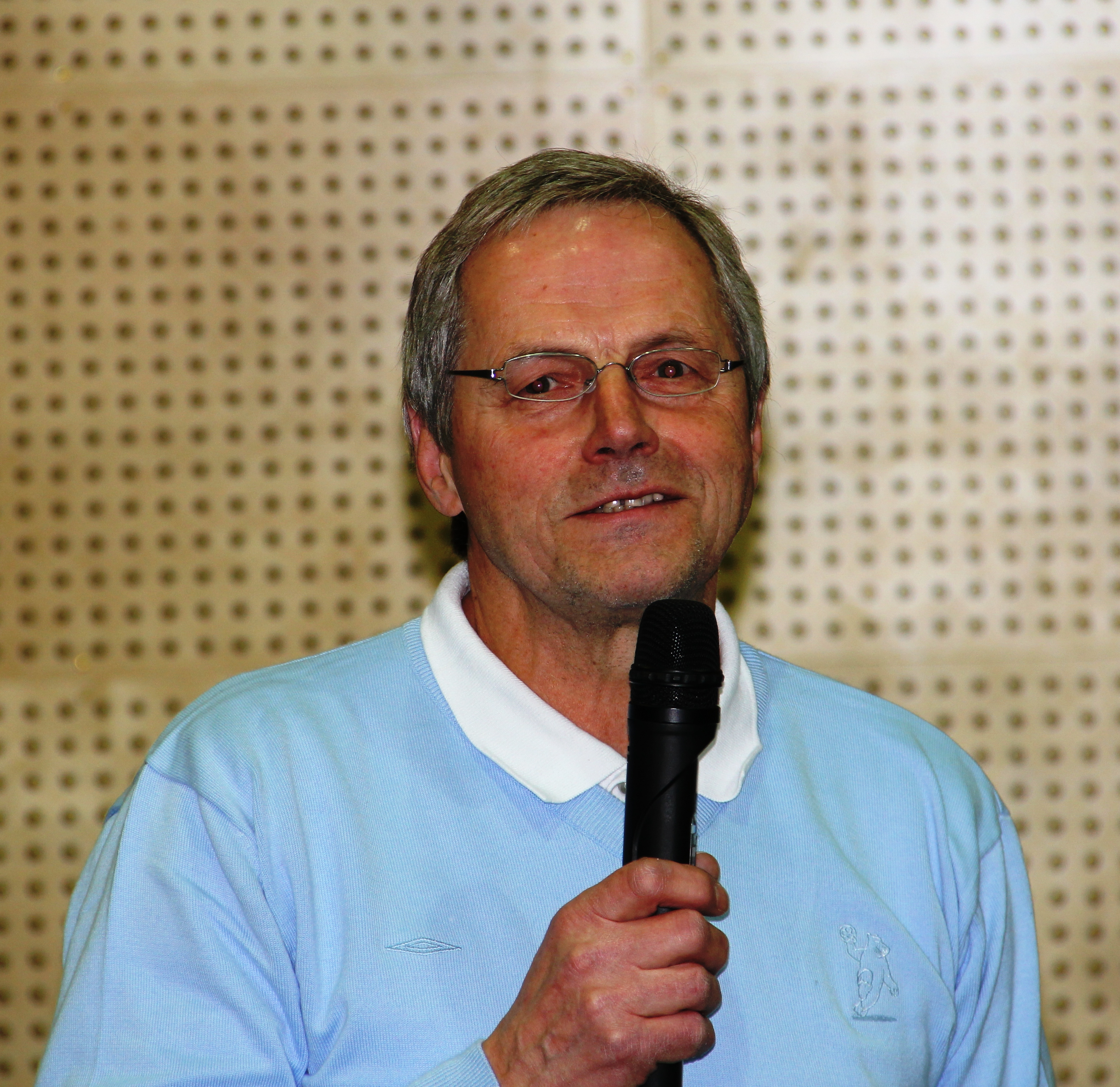

Personal information
- Nationality: Norwegian
- Born: 14 October 1947 (age 79)

Sport
- Sport: Handball

Senior clubs
- Years: Team
- 1965–1979: Refstad IL
National team
Years	Team	Apps	(Gls)
1973–1977	Norway	62	(83)

Teams managed
- 1979–1985: Norway
- –: Fredensborg/Ski

Per Otto Furuseth (born 14 October 1947) is a Norwegian team handball player and coach, and sports official.

== Career ==
Furuseth played 62 matches for the Norway men's national handball team during his active career, and played on club level for Refstad IL. In 1974 he won the Norwegian Championship, and in 1976 he won the Norwegian Men's Handball Cup, beating Stavanger IF in the final. He scored 3 goals in the final. In 1977 he won the Norwewgian Championship for a second time. In 1979 he won the title for a third time as a player-coach.

He was head coach for Norway's men's national team from 1979 to 1985. He did however not manage to qualify the team for either the Olympics or the World Cup.

Afterwards he worked with analysis at major international tournaments between 1982 and 2002. Meanwhile he was also the assistant general secretary for the Norwegian Handball Federation. In 2003 he was appointed Secretary General for the Norwegian Handball Federation. He left the position in 2010. Afterwards he has been a senior advisor to the federation.

Furuseth was awarded the Håndballstatuetten trophy from the Norwegian Handball Federation in 1999. In 2022 he was awarded the Norwegian Olympic and Paralympic Committee and Confederation of Sports's honorary award. He has also been awarded with the Swedish Handball Federation's 'högste utmärkelse' (eng: highest honour).
