= Camilla Carstens =

Norwegian team handball player (born 1977)

Personal information
- Nationality: Norwegian
- Born: 6 February 1977 (age 49)
- Height: 175 cm (69 in)

Sport
- Sport: Handball
- Position: Right back, centre back
- Current club: Retired

Senior clubs
- Years: Team
- 1996–1997: Fjellhammer IL
- 1997–1998: ASPTT Metz
- 1998-2001: Ikast FS
- 2001-2005: KIF Kolding
National team
Years	Team	Apps	(Gls)
1998–2000	Norway	13	(12)
Medal record
Representing Norway
Women's handball
European Championship
Gold medal – first place	1998 Netherlands	Team

Camilla Carstens (born 6 February 1977) is a Norwegian team handball player. She played for Fjellhammer IL, ASPTT Metz in France and the Danish clubs Ikast FS and KIF Kolding. She also played on the Norway women's national handball team. She became European champion with the Norwegian team in 1998. This was the first time Norway won that title.

Carstens made her debut on the national team in 1998 while playing for Metz Handball. She played 13 matches and scored 12 goals for the Norwegian national handball team between 1998 and 2000.

While playing for Ikast FS she grew tired of playing as a right back and switched clubs to KIF Kolding to be able to play as a centre back. Here she played until 2005.
