= Elkjøp-ligaen (men's handball) =

Premier men's handball league

- Sport: Handball
- Founded: 1966
- No. of teams: 14
- Country: Norway
- Confederation: EHF
- Most recent champion: Elverum Håndball
- Most titles: Sandefjord TIF (9 titles)
- Broadcasters: TV 2, TV 2 Sport 1, TV 2 Sport 2
- Level on pyramid: Level 1
- Relegation to: 1. divisjon
- International cups: EHF Champions League; EHF European League; EHF European Cup
- Website: handball.no
- 2025–26 season

Elkjøp-ligaen (Eliteserien i håndball for menn) is the premier men's professional handball league for Norwegian handball clubs. It is administered by the Norwegian Handball Federation, and the winners are recognized as Norwegian champions. It was established in 1966, and it is currently contested by fourteen teams. Sandefjord TIF, is the championship's most successful team with nine titles, followed by Oppsal and Elverum with six titles. Elverum is also the most successful in the playoffs with 11 titles.

Starting with the 2023–2024 season, the league expanded from 12 to 14 teams. As of 2026, Elverum is the defending champion.

Team	Location	Arena	Finished pos. in last season
Bergen Håndball	Bergen	Haukelandshallen	2nd (in 1. divisjon)
Bækkelaget HE	Oslo	Bækkelagshallen	10th
Drammen HK	Drammen	Drammenshallen	4th
Elverum Håndball	Elverum	Terningen Arena	2nd place, silver medalist(s)
Fjellhammer IL	Lørenskog	Lørenskoghallen	6th
Halden Topphåndball	Halden	Remmenhallen	8th
Haslum HK	Bærum	Nadderud Arena	12th
Kolstad Håndball	Trondheim	Kolstad Arena	1st place, gold medalist(s)
Kristiansand Topphåndball	Kristiansand	Aquarama	7th
Nærbø IL	Nærbø	Sparebanken Vest Arena	5th
Runar Sandefjord	Sandefjord	Runarhallen	3rd place, bronze medalist(s)
Sandnes Håndballklubb	Sandnes	Sandneshallen	8th
TIF Viking	Bergen	Åsane Arena	1st (in 1. divisjon)
ØIF Arendal Elite	Arendal	Sparebanken Sør Amfi	9th

== List of champions ==
The complete list of the Norwegian handball champions since 1968.

Season	(gold) Gold	(silver) Silver	(bronze) Bronze
1965-66	Fredensborg	Arild	Nordstrand
1966-67	Fredensborg	OSI	Arild
1967-68	OSI	BSI	Fredensborg
1968-69	BSI	OSI	Bækkelaget
1969-70	OSI	Arild	Oppsal
1970-71	Oppsal	Fredensborg	Nordstrand
1971-72	Oppsal	Fredensborg	Arild
1972-73	Oppsal	Refstad	Fredensborg
1973-74	Refstad	Fredensborg	Oppsal
1974-75	Fredensborg	Oppsal	Refstad
1975-76	Oppsal	Refstad	Fredensborg
1976-77	Refstad	Oppsal	Nordstrand
1977-78	Oppsal	Refstad	Fredensborg
1978-79	Refstad	Oppsal	Fredensborg/Ski
1979-80	Oppsal	Kristiansand	Sverresborg IF
1980-81	Nordstrand	Fredensborg/Ski	Kristiansand
1981-82	Fredensborg/Ski	Nordstrand	Fjellhammer IL
1982-83	Kolbotn	Fredensborg/Ski	Oppsal
1983-84	Kolbotn	Fjellhammer IL	Fredensborg/Ski
1984-85	Urædd	Kolbotn	Fredensborg/Ski
1985-86	Stavanger	Fredensborg/Ski	Urædd
1986-87	Stavanger	Urædd	Bækkelaget
1987-88	Urædd	Stavanger	Bækkelaget
1988-89	Stavanger	Urædd	Kragerø
1989-90	Stavanger	Runar	Sandefjord
1990-91	Sandefjord	Stavanger	Runar
1991-92	Urædd	Stavanger	Viking
1992-93	Sandefjord	Urædd	Runar
1993-94	Runar	Sandefjord	Kragerø
1994-95	Runar	Drammen	Elverum
1995-96	Runar	Stavanger	Drammen
1996-97	Drammen	Viking	Sandefjord
1997-98	Viking	Sandefjord	Runar
1998-99	Sandefjord	Viking	Runar
1999-00	Runar	Sandefjord	Viking
2000-01	Sandefjord	Drammen	Runar
2001-02	Sandefjord	Runar	Drammen
2002-03	Sandefjord	Stavanger Håndball (Note: Stavanger Håndball is the result of a merge between Stavanger IF and Viking HK.)	Runar
2003-04	Sandefjord	Drammen	Haslum
2004-05	Sandefjord	Haslum	Fyllingen
2005-06	Sandefjord	Drammen	Vestli
2006-07	Drammen	Sandefjord	Haslum
2007-08	Drammen	Runar	Haslum
2008-09	Fyllingen	Haslum	Drammen
2009-10	Drammen	Elverum	Runar
2010-11	Haslum	Elverum	Drammen
2011-12	Haslum	Elverum	Drammen
2012-13	Elverum	Haslum	BSK/NIF
2013-14	Haslum	Elverum	Bækkelaget
2014-15	ØIF Arendal	Bodø	Haslum
2015-16	ØIF Arendal	Haslum	Elverum
2016-17	Elverum	Bækkelaget	Haslum
2017-18	Elverum	Drammen	ØIF Arendal
2018-19	ØIF Arendal	Elverum	Drammen
2019-20	Elverum	ØIF Arendal	Drammen
2020-21	Elverum	ØIF Arendal	Drammen
2021-22	Elverum	Drammen	Runar
2022-23	Kolstad	Elverum	Runar
2023-24	Kolstad	Elverum	Runar
2024-25	Elverum	Kolstad	Runar
2025-26	Elverum	Kolstad	Bergen Håndball

== EHF coeffecient rank ==
EHF league ranking for 2022/23 season:

- 15. (15) (Switzerland) Quickline Handball League (31.40)
- 16. (18) (Russia) Superleague (30.60)
- 17. (16) (Norway) REMA 1000-ligaen (30.50)
- 18. (17) (Slovakia) Niké Handball Extraliga (20.40)
- 19. (20) (Austria) ZTE Meisterliga (17.75)

== Names of the competition ==
- 1965–1972: Hovedserien
- 1972–1993: 1. divisjon
- 1993–1997: Eliteserien
- 1997–2005: Gildeserien
- 2005–2007: Eliteserien
- 2007–2014: Postenligaen, after Posten Norge
- 2014–2017: GRUNDIGligaen, after Grundig
- 2017–2019: Eliteserien
- 2019–2026: REMA 1000-ligaen, after REMA 1000
- 2026–: Elkjøp-ligaen, after Elkjøp
