= Magnus López =

Norwegian footballer (born 2003)

- Magnus with Santos Laguna

Personal information
- Full name: Magnus Francisco López Gustavsen
- Date of birth: 10 February 2006 (age 20)
- Place of birth: Oslo, Norway
- Height: 1.90 m (6 ft 3 in)
- Position: Forward

Team information
- Current team: Santos Laguna
- Number: 188

Youth career
- –2019: Stabæk Fotball
- 2020–2022: Fornebu Fotballklubb
- 2023–2024: Lyn Fotball
- 2026–: Santos Laguna

Senior career*
Years	Team	Apps	(Gls)
2023–2024	Lyn Fotball 2	42	(28)
2025–2026	Nordstrand IF	22	(16)
2025	→ Nordstrand IF 2 (loan)	3	(2)
- * Club domestic league appearances and goals

Magnus Francisco López Gustavsen (born 10 February 2006) is a Norwegian professional footballer who plays as a forward for Santos Laguna.

== Early life ==
López was born on 10 February 2006. Born in Oslo, Norway, he was born to a Mexican father and a Norwegian mother.

== Career ==
As a youth player, López joined the youth academy of Norwegian side Stabæk Fotball. Following his stint there, he joined the youth academy of Norwegian side Fornebu Fotballklubb in 2020.

Ahead of the 2023 season, he joined the youth academy of Norwegian side Lyn Fotball and was promoted to the club's reserve team the same year, where he made forty-two league appearances and scored twenty-eight goals. Two years later, he signed for Norwegian side Nordstrand IF, where he made twenty-two league appearances and scored sixteen goals. Subsequently, he joined the youth academy of Mexican side Santos Laguna.

== Style of play ==
López plays as a forward. Mexican news website Futbol Total wrote in 2025 that "he has a long stride due to his height and he likes to pressure opposing defenders; he often battles and fights with them. He's a player who knows how to work hard to create his own scoring opportunities".
