= Sandnes Håndballklubb =

Norwegian handball club

- Short name: SHK / Sandnes HK
- Founded: 1965; 61 years ago
- Arena: Giskehallen
- Capacity: 900
- League: REMA 1000-ligaen (men)
- 2024–25 (men): 11th
- Club colours
Home	Away

Sandnes Håndballklubb is a Norwegian handball club from Sandnes, currently playing in the highest tier of Norwegian handball, the Elitserien. They play their matches in Giskehallen. The club was founded in 1965, when they broke away from Sandnes Ulf. In 2014 they were promoted to the 1st Division for the first time. In 2017 they were promoted to the Elitserien, the top division, but just a season after they were relegated again. In 2022 they were promoted again, and this time they managed to stay up.

== Team ==
=== Current squad ===
Squad for the 2026–27 season

Goalkeepers
Left Wingers
Right Wingers
Line players

Left Backs
Central Backs
Right Backs

=== Transfers ===
Transfers for the 2026–27 season

Joining

Leaving

- (Faroe Islands) Pauli Jacobsen (GK) to (Sweden) IFK Skövde

=== Transfer History ===
Transfers for the 2025–26 season

Joining

- (Faroe Islands) Pauli Jacobsen (GK) from (Denmark) HØJ Elite

Leaving
