= ØIF Arendal =

Norwegian handball club

- Full name: Øyestad Idrettsforening Arendal
- Nickname: Øyestad
- Short name: ØIF
- Founded: April 1, 1929; 97 years ago
- Arena: Sparebanken Norge Amfi Arendal, Arendal
- Capacity: 3,000
- Head coach: Josip Vidovic
- Captain: Kristijan Jurisic
- League: Elkjøp-ligaen
- Club colours
Home	Away

ØIF Arendal is a Norwegian handball team located in the municipality of Arendal in Agder county, Norway. Since 2009, they have competed in the highest league for men's handball clubs in Norway.

The team colours are red and black. They play their home matches at Sparebanken Norge Amfi Arendal, with the playing court dressed in red and black.

== History ==
The club was founded on April 1, 1929. The club was promoted to the top division in the 2008/2009 season. Former international Preben Vildalen also played for the promoted team.

Before their 2009 top division debut season, the men's team was separated into a distinct legal entity under the multi-sport club Øyestad IF Allianse, which is when they got their current name: ØIF Arendal (legally: Øyestad IF håndball elite). The original Øyestad sports club men's team (Øyestad IF håndball) plays at the national third level and partners with ØIF Arendal as a feeder team.

The team debuted in the elite series on September 26, 2009, defeating Runar Sandefjord 27–24 at home. They finished fourth in 2010 and 2011.

In the 2012/2013 season, the team moved from the Nedeneshallen sports hall to the new Sparebanken Sør Amfi (renamed Sparebanken Norge Amfi Arendal in 2025).

On 30 December 2014, ØIF won the Norwegian Cup for the first time after defeating Bodø HK 23–22 in the final. ØIF won the Norwegian League in 2015, 2016 and 2019.

== Team ==
=== Current squad ===
Squad for the 2026–27 season

ØIF Arendal

Goalkeepers

- 1 (Norway) Kristijan Jurisic
- 12 (Norway) Sivert Jonson Tryggestad
- 16 (Norway) Mads Venemyr
- 16 (Norway) Vladyslav Shyriaiev

Left Wingers

- 9 (Norway) Ask Kristian Langerød-Nilsen
- 27 (Norway) Sebastian Løvlie Simonsen
- 32 (Norway) Benjamin Swan

Right Wingers

- 4 (Norway) Lukas Sørensen Nordahl
- 7 (Denmark) (Greece) Viktor Vlastos
- 81 (Norway) Sander Løvlie Simonsen

Line Players

- 6 (Denmark) Victor Aunsbjerg Lyngsø
- 13 (Norway) Fater Chalhoub
- 17 (Sweden) Adrian Hesslekrans

Backs

- 8 (Denmark) Victor Baltzer Hansen
- 10 (Norway) Magnus Langeland
- 11 (Norway) Mathias Wahlstrøm
- 14 (Norway) Tobias Skonnord Hansen
- 15 (Sweden) Kurt Albin Sebastian Broman
- 19 (Norway) Marius Giske Nordaas
- 21 (Norway) Lars Eivind Stärk Gurrich
- 25 (Norway) Kristian Jakobsen Stranden
- 31 (Norway) Simen Rekdal Hansen

=== Technical staff ===
- Head coach: (Croatia) Josip Vidovic
- Assistant coach: (Sweden) Kenny Ekman
- Physiotherapist: (Norway) Harald Eiker Berg
- Physiotherapist: (Norway) Preben Jørgensen

=== Transfers ===
Transfers for the 2026–27 season

Joining

- (Sweden) Albin Broman (RB) from (Sweden) IF Hallby
- (Norway) Kristian Stranden (LB) from (Norway) Elverum Håndball
- (Norway) Sivert Jonson Tryggestad (GK) from (Norway) Runar Sandefjord
- (Norway) Lars Eivind Gurrich (LB) from (Norway) Runar Sandefjord
- (Norway) Tobias Skonnord Hansen (CB) from (Norway) Follo HK
- (Norway) Fater Chalhoub (LP) from (Norway) Kragerø
- (Norway) Vladyslav Shyriaiev (GK) from (Norway) AK28
- (Norway) Benjamin Swan (LW) from (Norway) Øyestad IF

Leaving

- (Iceland) Dagur Gautason (LW) to (Iceland) KA
- (Denmark) Pelle Boesen (CB) to (Spain) CB Cangas
- (Norway) Vemund Norheim Ask (LB) to (Norway) Kolstad Håndball
- (Norway) Sverre Rodvelt Asser to (Norway) KRS Topphåndball
- (Denmark) Mikkel Milling-Hansen to (Germany) Stralsunder HV
- (Norway) Simen Westby Johansen (quitting)

=== Transfer History ===
Transfers for the 2025–26 season

Joining

- (Norway) Sverre Rodvelt Asser (RB) from (Norway) Åsane håndball
- (Iceland) Dagur Gautason (LW) from (France) Montpellier Handball
- (Norway) Mads Venemyr from Øyestad IF
- (Norway) Kristoffer Vervik Kristiansen from Øyestad IF
- (Norway) Eivind Andre Dale Kylland from Øyestad IF
- (Norway) Simen Rekdal Hansen from Øyestad IF
- (Denmark) Mikkel Milling-Hansen (LP) from (Norway) Ryger handball
- (Denmark) Victor Baltzer (LB) from (Denmark) Faaborg ØH
- (Denmark) Victor Aunsbjerg Lyngsø (LP) from (Denmark) KIF Kolding

Leaving

- (Norway) Sondre Gjerdalen (LP) to (Norway) Elverum Håndball
- (Norway) Magnus Tveitdal Olsen (GK)
- (Sweden) Mirko Vicentijevic Örtorp (CB)
- (Norway) Birk Hermann Inselseth (RB) to (Denmark) TMS Ringsted
- (Norway) Jørg William Fiala Gjermundnes (LB) to (Sweden) Amo Handboll
- (Norway) Alexander Løke Gautestad (LP) to (Norway) Runar Sandefjord
- (Denmark) Mikkel Sommer Lund to (Denmark) TM Tønder
- (Norway) Arni Bergur Sigurbergsson
- (Norway) Mathias Wahlstrøm
- (Norway) Tengel Østerhus Lindheim

Transfers for the 2024–25 season

Joining

- (Denmark) Pelle Boesen (CB) from (Denmark) KIF Kolding
- (Denmark) Mikkel Sommer Lund (RB) from (Denmark) KIF Kolding
- (Sweden) Adrian Hesslekrans (LP) from (Sweden) Lugi HF
- (Norway) Simen Westby Johansen (GK) from (Norway) Bækkelaget HE
- (Norway) Magnus Langeland (LB) from (Norway) Kolstad Håndball

Leaving

- (Denmark) Mathias Larson (CB) to (Norway) Elverum Håndball
- (Croatia) Ivan Ereš (GK) to (Romania) HC Odorheiu Secuiesc

== Previous squads ==
2018–2019 Team
Shirt No	Nationality	Player	Birth Date	Position
1	Norway	Kristijan Jurisic	6 September 1995 (age 31)	Goalkeeper
3	Croatia	Josip Vidović	21 May 1990 (age 36)	Central Back
5	Norway	Kristoffer Pedersen	16 June 1998 (age 28)	Left Back
6	Sweden	Martin Lindell	25 July 1993 (age 33)	Left Back
8	Norway	Hermann Vildalen	17 September 1995 (age 31)	Left Back
9	Norway	André Lindboe	24 June 1988 (age 38)	Left Winger
10	Norway	Sondre Paulsen	21 May 1988 (age 38)	Right Winger
11	Norway	Jørg William Fiala Gjermundnes	29 April 2001 (age 25)	Left Back
12	Norway	André Bergsholm Kristensen	15 March 2000 (age 26)	Goalkeeper
13	Iceland	Nökkvi Dan Ellidason	24 June 1997 (age 29)	Central Back
14	Norway	Eirik Heia Pedersen	3 January 1989 (age 37)	Left Back
15	Norway	Laurits Mo Rannekleiv	31 January 1994 (age 32)	Line Player
16	Norway	Oliver Trondal	31 August 2001 (age 25)	Goalkeeper
17	Norway	Olaf Richter Hoffstad	8 January 1999 (age 27)	Left Winger
20	Norway	Kjetil Andal	26 February 1999 (age 27)	Left Winger
22	Denmark	Jesper Munk Johanson	22 December 1990 (age 35)	Line Player
23	Sweden	Maximilian Jonsson	12 October 1989 (age 37)	Right Back
81	Norway	Sander Løvlie Simonsen	9 July 1998 (age 28)	Right Winger
87	Sweden	Per Kenny Ekman	1 July 1987 (age 39)	Line Player

2015–2016 Team
Shirt No	Nationality	Player	Birth Date	Position
1	Norway	Svenn Erik Medhus	22 June 1982 (age 44)	Goalkeeper
2	Norway	Alexander Friden	17 January 1995 (age 31)	Central Back
3	Croatia	Josip Vidović	21 May 1990 (age 36)	Central Back
4	Norway	Haakon Finsrud	9 April 1994 (age 32)	Left Winger
5	Norway	Grunde Sakariassen	30 November 1996 (age 29)	Left Winger
7	Norway	Lars Erik Bjørnsen	20 July 1982 (age 44)	Right Winger
8	Norway	Magnus Jøndal	7 February 1988 (age 38)	Left Winger
9	Norway	David Svenningsen	22 January 1988 (age 38)	Central Back
10	Norway	Sondre Paulsen	21 May 1988 (age 38)	Right Winger
12	Norway	Aasmund Strat	25 April 1990 (age 36)	Goalkeeper
14	Norway	Eirik Heia Pedersen	3 January 1989 (age 37)	Left Back
15	Norway	Laurits Mo Rannekleiv	31 January 1994 (age 32)	Line Player
16	Norway	Markus Evensen	11 November 1997 (age 28)	Goalkeeper
17	Norway	David Andre Rui	31 July 1991 (age 35)	Left Winger
18	Iceland	Einar Ingi Hrafnsson	16 September 1984 (age 42)	Line Player
20	Norway	Fredrik Aamodt Langeld	12 May 1996 (age 30)	Right Back
21	Denmark	Lars Jakobsen	10 September 1987 (age 39)	Left Back
24	Croatia	Robert Markotić	7 March 1990 (age 36)	Right Back
26	Norway	Eirik Køpp	10 January 1996 (age 30)	Left Back
81	Norway	Sander Løvlie Simonsen	9 July 1998 (age 28)	Right Winger
87	Sweden	Per Kenny Ekman	1 July 1987 (age 39)	Line Player

== Accomplishments ==
- Norwegian League:
  - Gold (3): 2015, 2016, 2019
  - Silver (2): 2020, 2021
  - Bronze (1): 2018
- Norwegian Cup:
  - Gold (1): 2014
  - Silver (1): 2021

== EHF ranking ==
As of 22/10/2026

Rank	Team	Points
156	(Croatia) MRK Dugo Selo	23
157	(Turkey) İstanbul GSK	23
158	(Norway) ØIF Arendal	23
159	(Faroe Islands) VÍF	22
160	(Bosnia and Herzegovina) RK Borac Banja Luka	21

== Former club members ==
=== Notable former players ===
==== Goalkeepers ====
- (Norway) Svenn Erik Medhus (2010–2017)
- (Brazil) César Almeida (2016–2017)

==== Right wingers ====
- (Norway) Lars Erik Bjørnsen (2015–2016)
- (Norway) Sondre Paulsen (2010–2021)

==== Left wingers ====
- (Norway) Magnus Jøndal (2014–2016)
- (Norway) André Lindboe (2018–2021)
- (Norway) August Pedersen (2016–2018)

==== Line players ====
- (Norway) Håvard Augensen (2009–2011)
- (Denmark) Frederik Børm (2021–2023)
- (Kosovo) Luigj Quni (2019–2020)

==== Left backs ====
- (Norway) André Jørgensen (1996–1998, 2010–2015)
- (Norway) Hermann Vildalen (2012–2014, 2020–2021)
- (Denmark) René Bach Madsen (2013–2014)
- (Finland) Nico Rönnberg (2013–2014)

==== Central backs ====
- (Norway) Preben Vildalen (2007–2010)
- (Norway) Mario Matic (2019–2024)

==== Right backs ====
- (Norway) Magnus Søndenå (2021–2023)
- (Croatia) Nikola Kedžo (2016)
- (Sweden) Marcus Dahlin (2014–2015)
