= Bodø Spektrum =

Sports venue in Bodø, Norway

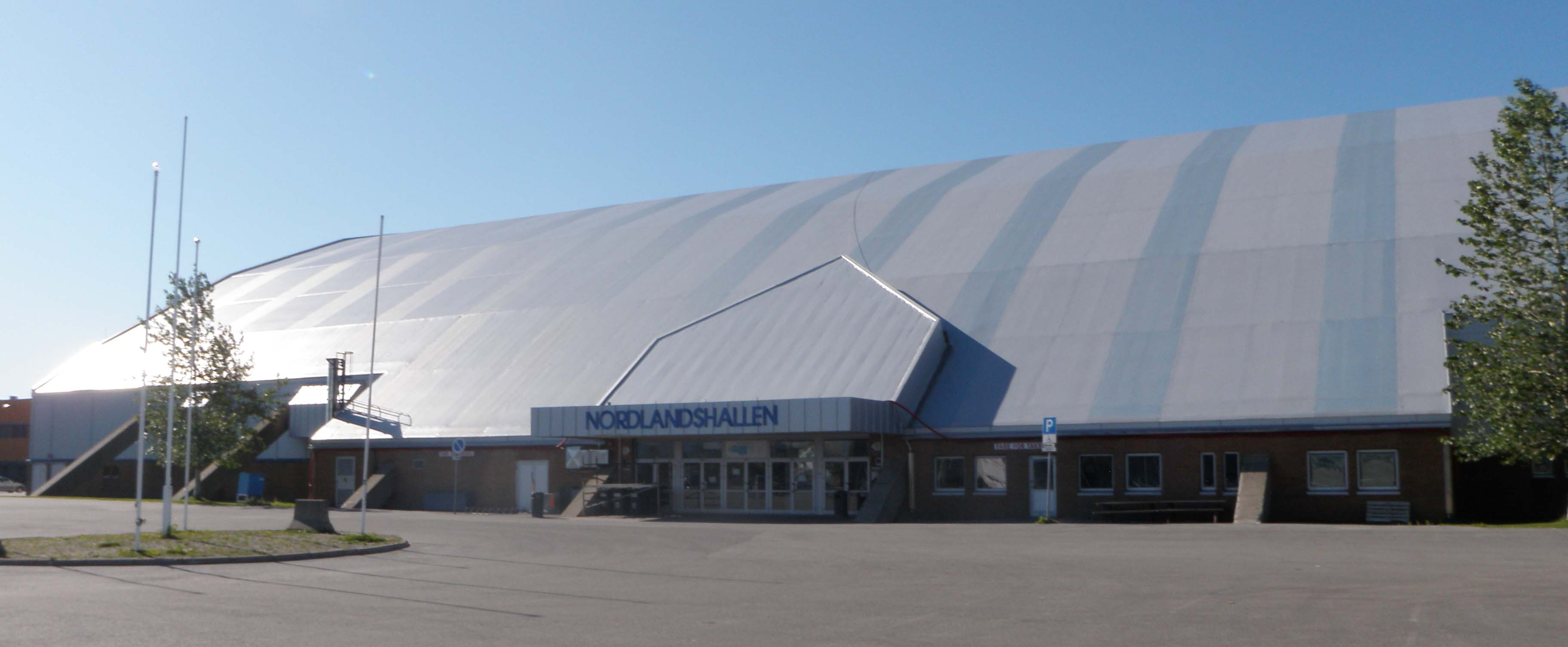
- Nordlandshallen at Bodø Spektrum
- Interactive map of Bodø Spektrum
- Location: Bodø, Norway
- Coordinates: 67.2782°N 14.4147°E
- Owner: Bodø Municipality
- Operator: Bodø Spektrum AS
- Surface: Artificial turf

Construction
- Opened: 21 September 1991

Tenants
- FK Bodø/Glimt; Grand Bodø; Bodø HK

Bodø Spektrum is an indoor sports complex in Bodø, Norway. In 1990, construction of Nordlandshallen started, which would allow Glimt a winter training ground, It opened on 21 September 1991.

The largest hall is Nordlandshallen, an association football hall with artificial turf and seating for 5,500 used by Bodø/Glimt and Grand Bodø. Bodøhallen opened in 2007 and is used for handball by Bodø HK. It also consists of Nordlandsbadet, a water park.

Nordlandshallen was used as Bodø/Glimts main venue during the last season matches in the Norwegian Premier League in 1993 and 1997.

== See also ==
- List of indoor arenas in Norway
- List of indoor ice rinks in Norway
