= Nærbø Håndball =

Norwegian handball club

Nærbø Idrettslag
- Full name: Nærbø Idrettslag
- Short name: Nærbø
- Founded: 23 September 1923; 103 years ago
- Arena: Sparebanken Norge Arena, Nærbø
- Capacity: 2,000
- Head coach: Fredrik Ruud
- League: REMA 1000-ligaen
- Club colours
Home	Away

Nærbø Håndball is the men's handball team of the Norwegian multi-sports club Nærbø IL based in Nærbø, Rogaland. They compete in REMA 1000-ligaen, which is the highest league for men's handball clubs in Norway.

Location of Nærbø IL

== History ==
The club was founded on 23 September 1923. The men's handball team first reached the elite league in 2008. The team only stayed in the elite league for one season, after losing all 22 league matches. The team was promoted to the elite league again in 2018. In 2020, they reached the final of the Norwegian Cup, but lost to Elverum Håndball 37-29. On 28 May 2022, the team won their first international title after beating CS Minaur Baia Mare over two matches in the final round of the EHF European Cup. They also reached the EHF European Cup final in the following 2022/23 season, but lost to Serbian RK Vojvodina in both matches.

== Crest, colours, supporters ==
=== Kit manufacturers ===
Period	Kit manufacturer
–2022	(Denmark) Hummel
2022–present	(England) Umbro

=== Kits ===
HOME
2020–22	2022-25

AWAY

2022-25

THIRD

2022-25

== Team ==
=== Current squad ===
Squad for the 2025–26 season

Nærbø IL

Goalkeepers

- 1 (Norway) Halvor‑Elias Nærland
- 12 (Denmark) Joachim Søholm Christensen
- 16 (Norway) Ben Thomas Kverme

Left Wingers

- 23 (Norway) Nikolai Nordås Steinsland
- 30 (Norway) John Thue
- 35 (Norway) Sander Håland
- 37 (Norway) Bo Kristian Kverme

Right Wingers

- 11 (Norway) Theodor Svensgård
- 13 (Norway) Tord Aksnes Lode
- 36 (Norway) Teo Jørgensen Anzjøn

Line Players

- 2 (Norway) Ole Nærland
- 17 (Denmark) Mike Würtz Lønne
- 18 (Norway) Jonas Søyland Andersen

Left Backs

- 3 (Norway) Felix Abrahamsen Lunde
- 9 (Norway) Rassin Haugseng
- 10 (Norway) Tord Haugseng

Central Backs

- 8 (Norway) Andreas Horst Haugseng
- 22 (Norway) Kasper Lothe
- 96 (Norway) Vetle Mellemstrand Bore

Right Backs

- 25 (Norway) Kristoffer Dueland Iversen
- 67 (Norway) Lars Sigve Hamre

=== Transfers ===
Transfers for the 2026–27 season

Joining

Leaving

- (Norway) Vetle Bore (LB) from (Norway) Kolstad Håndball

=== Transfer History ===
Transfers for the 2025–26 season

Joining

Leaving

- (Sweden) Gustav Bergendahl (LP) to (Denmark) TMS Ringsted
- (Norway) Jesper Røisland (RB) to (Sweden) IK Sävehof

== Previous squads ==
2022–2023 Team
Shirt No	Nationality	Player	Birth Date	Position
1	Norway	Halvor‑Elias Nærland	14 February 1998 (age 28)	Goalkeeper
2	Norway	Ole Nærland	14 June 1998 (age 28)	Line Player
4	Norway	Torger Edland	17 February 2004 (age 22)	Left Back
6	Norway	Jonas Mælen	22 April 2002 (age 24)	Right Back
7	Norway	Gustav Halvorsen	11 July 1999 (age 27)	Left Winger
8	Norway	Andreas Horst Haugseng	18 August 1998 (age 28)	Central Back
9	Norway	Rassin Haugseng	21 February 1998 (age 28)	Left Back
10	Norway	Tord Haugseng	30 September 1999 (age 27)	Left Back
11	Norway	Theodor Svensgård	1 November 1998 (age 28)	Right Winger
12	Denmark	Joachim Søholm Christensen	6 July 1986 (age 40)	Goalkeeper
13	Norway	Tord Aksnes Lode	27 October 1998 (age 28)	Right Winger
14	Norway	Lars Eirik Larsen	17 March 2004 (age 22)	Line Player
17	Denmark	Mike Würtz Lønne	8 July 1995 (age 31)	Line Player
22	Norway	Kasper Lothe	22 December 1998 (age 27)	Central Back
27	Norway	Even Penne	27 February 2004 (age 22)	Left Winger
30	Norway	John Thue	24 March 1998 (age 28)	Left Winger
34	Sweden	Gustav Bergendahl	24 February 1998 (age 28)	Line Player
35	Norway	Marius Olseth	29 June 2004 (age 22)	Right Winger
36	Norway	Jesper Edland	7 September 2004 (age 22)	Central Back
37	Norway	Lars Thomas Line	6 July 2004 (age 22)	Right Winger
67	Norway	Lars Sigve Hamre	22 April 1997 (age 29)	Right Back
99	Norway	Alvar Haugseng	13 May 2004 (age 22)	Right Back

2021–2022 Team
Shirt No	Nationality	Player	Birth Date	Position
1	Norway	Halvor‑Elias Nærland	14 February 1998 (age 28)	Goalkeeper
2	Norway	Ole Nærland	14 June 1998 (age 28)	Line Player
3	Norway	Atle Gudmestad	15 June 1989 (age 37)	Right Back
4	Norway	Torger Edland	17 February 2004 (age 22)	Left Back
6	Norway	Henning Lea Knutsen	11 April 2000 (age 26)	Central Back
7	Norway	Gustav Halvorsen	11 July 1999 (age 27)	Left Winger
8	Norway	Andreas Horst Haugseng	18 August 1998 (age 28)	Central Back
9	Norway	Rassin Haugseng	21 February 1998 (age 28)	Left Back
10	Norway	Tord Haugseng	30 September 1999 (age 27)	Left Back
11	Norway	Theodor Svensgård	1 November 1998 (age 28)	Right Winger
13	Norway	Tord Aksnes Lode	27 October 1998 (age 28)	Right Winger
14	Norway	Lars Eirik Larsen	17 March 2004 (age 22)	Line Player
15	Denmark	Lasse Hamann-Boeriths	15 May 1997 (age 29)	Central Back
17	Denmark	Mike Würtz Lønne	8 July 1995 (age 31)	Line Player
23	Norway	Preben Nord-Varhaug	14 May 1997 (age 29)	Right Back
24	Norway	Vegard Bakken Øien	8 July 1994 (age 32)	Goalkeeper
30	Norway	John Thue	24 March 1998 (age 28)	Left Winger
32	Norway	Andreas Lervik	11 February 2003 (age 23)	Central Back
33	Norway	Eirik Sunde	22 May 2003 (age 23)	Central Back
34	Norway	Stian Vigre	12 March 1998 (age 28)	Left Back
35	Norway	Marius Olseth	29 June 2004 (age 22)	Right Winger
36	Norway	Jesper Edland	7 September 2004 (age 22)	Central Back
37	Norway	Jonas Mælen	22 April 2002 (age 24)	Right Back
67	Norway	Lars Sigve Hamre	22 April 1997 (age 29)	Right Back

== Accomplishments ==
- EHF European Cup:
  - Gold (1): 2022
  - Silver (1): 2023
- Norwegian Cup:
  - Silver (1): 2020

== European record ==
=== EHF European Cup ===
Season	Round	Club	Home	Away	Aggregate
2021–22; Winners	R2	(Italy) Handball Sassari	26–25	35–28	61–53
2021–22; Winners	R3	(Italy) Pallamano Conversano	31–27	25–27	56–54
2021–22; Winners	Round of 16	(Romania) CSM Focșani	39–26	28–32	67–58
2021–22; Winners	Quarter-finals	(Belarus) SKA Minsk	10–0	10–0	20–0
2021–22; Winners	Semi-finals	(Norway) Drammen HK	30–27	27–30	57–57 (5-4 p)
2021–22; Winners	Finals	(Romania) CS Minaur Baia Mare	29–25	27–26	56–51

=== EHF ranking ===
As of 22 October 2026

Rank	Team	Points
102	(Luxembourg) Red Boys Differdange	45
103	(Slovakia) MŠK Považská Bystrica	45
104	(Germany) Frisch Auf Göppingen	45
105	(Norway) Nærbø IL	43
106	(Portugal) Águas Santas	43
107	(Bosnia and Herzegovina) RK Sloga	41
108	(Romania) CSM Constanța	40

== Former club members ==
=== Notable former players ===
Criteria

To appear in this section a player must have either:

- Played at least one official international match for their national team at any time.
- Or spent at least 10 years with the team.

==== Left wingers ====
- (Norway) Sindre Heldal (2018–2021)

==== Central backs ====
- (Norway) Andreas Horst Haugseng (2016–)
