= Frederik Børm =

Danish handball player (born 1988)

Personal information
- Full name: Frederik Gustenhoff Børm
- Nationality: Danish
- Born: 12 August 1988 (age 38) Randers, Denmark
- Height: 1.95 m (6 ft 5 in)

Sport
- Sport: Handball
- Position: Pivot
- Current club: ØIF Arendal
- Number: 88

Senior clubs
- Years: Team
- 2007–2008: Stoholm Håndbold
- 2008–2009: Bjerringbro-Silkeborg
- 2009–2010: Viborg HK
- 2010–2011: Nordsjælland Håndbold
- 2011–2013: KIF Kolding
- 2013–2015: Skjern Håndbold
- 2015–2020: SønderjyskE
- 2020–2021: Aarhus Håndbold
- 2021: Istres Provence Handball
- 2021–2023: ØIF Arendal
- 2023–2025: Skive fH
- 2025–: Norddjurs Håndbold
National team
Years	Team	Apps	(Gls)
2010–	Denmark	13	(6)
- Updated on 29 May 2026

Frederik Gustenhoff Børm (born August 12, 1988) is a Danish handball player who plays for the Danish team Norddjurs Håndbold. Frederik Børm joined Norddjurs Håndbold as part of their 2025–2026 season.

== Career ==
Frederik Børm has played in a number of Danish handball clubs including Aarhus Håndbold, SønderjyskE, Skjern Håndbold, KIF Kolding, Nordsjælland Håndbold, Viborg HK, Bjerringbro-Silkeborg and Stoholm Håndbold. He has also played abroad first in France for Istres Provence Handball for the end of their 2020–2021 season and later for the Norwegian team ØIF Arendal from the 2021/2022 season.
