= Refstad-Veitvet IL =

Norwegian sports club

- Founded: 1946 as Refstad IL; 1985 as Refstad-Veitvet IL
- Dissolved: 2006; 20 years ago
- Arena: Veitvethallen
- Capacity: -
- League: -
Home	Away

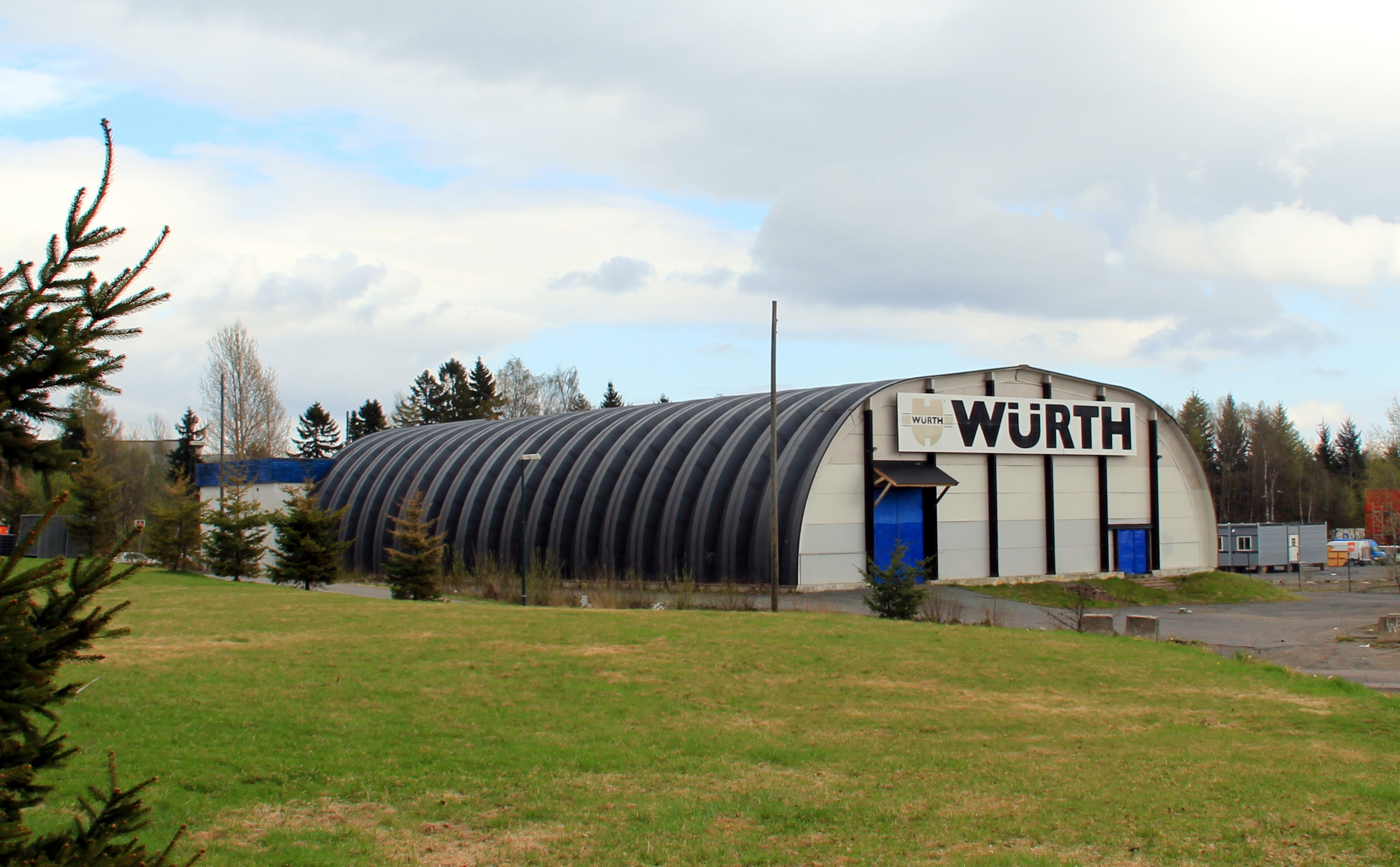
Veitvethallen was the club's home ground from 1982 to 2014 (photo: C. Hill, 2013)

Refstad-Veitvet Idrettslag was a Norwegian sports club from Oslo.

It was founded in 1985 as a merger between Refstad IL (founded 1946) and Veitvet IL (founded 1955). It was especially known for its team handball section. Refstad IL had won several handball championships for men between 1974 and 1979. Players included Harald Tyrdal, Sven-Tore Jacobsen and Per Otto Furuseth. The club later went defunct in 2006. A new club named Veitvet SK was later founded.
