= SK Arild =

Norwegian sports club

Sportsklubben Arild was a multi-sports club in Oslo, Norway. It had sections for team handball, Nordic skiing, orienteering and track and field athletics including race walking.

The club was founded on 22 March 1919 by boys who belonged to the St. James Church congregation. With skiing, athletics and football being practised, football was dropped around 1925. Instead, race walking, hiking and orienteering were taken up. In 1936, Arild's athletics team competed in Gothenburg and got to know the sport of team handball. In 1937, representatives from SK Arild and Ullern SK played Norway's first handball match at Akershus Fortress and founded the Norwegian Handball Federation.

Arild won the first Norwegian championship title for men in 1939, when the sport was played outdoors, and followed up with outdoor titles in 1949, 1950 and 1951. When handball started the indoor championships that are now standard, Arild won the first men's title in 1958 and another in 1964.

The club was relegated from the highest division in 1975, and later went defunct.
