= Bergen Håndball =

Norwegian handball club

Idrettslaget Bergen Håndball
- Short name: Bergen Håndball
- Founded: 1969 (as Fyllingen Håndball); 20 May 2010 (as FyllingenBergen); 18 August 2021 (as Bergen Håndball)
- Arena: Haukelandshallen
- Capacity: 5,100
- Head coach: Fredrik Tønne
- League: REMA 1000-ligaen
- 2022–23: 2nd (1. divisjon)
- Club colours
Home	Away

Idrettslaget Bergen Håndball (founded in 1969 as Fyllingen Håndball and on 20 May 2010 as Fyllingen Håndball Elite - previously known as «FyllingenBergen») is a Norwegian handball club from Bergen, which plays in REMA 1000-ligaen, the top division in the country, since their promotion in 2023.

== History ==
The handball department of Fyllingen Idrettslag was established in 1969, but their breakthrough came when the men's team was promoted to the best league in 1991. They earned a silver medal in the Norwegian cup in 1994 and in 2005 they saw success again when they ended 3rd in the Norwegian league, earning in a bronze medal.

The club took league gold in the 2008/09 season, and participated in the EHF Champions League during the 2009/10 season.

In the 2009/10 season, the team took playoff gold, after beating Runar in the final.

Midway through 2010, Fyllingen Håndball Elite («FyllingenBergen») was established as a separate club, by separating the elite effort for men from the broadside and women's handball in Fyllingen Håndball.

The club was cup champion in both 2012 and 2013, while receiving silver in 1994, 2008 and 2015.

=== Name ===
- 1969–2010: Fyllingen Håndball
- 2010–2021: FyllingenBergen
- 2021–: Bergen Håndball

== Achievements ==
- REMA 1000-ligaen
  - Gold: 2008/09
  - Bronze: 2004/05, 2025/26
- Norwegian Cup
  - Gold: 2012, 2013
  - Silver: 1993/94, 2007/08, 2015

== Team ==
=== Current squad ===
Squad for the 2023–24 season

Goalkeeper

- 16 (Norway) Tord Vårdal
- 95 (Norway) Jonas Fjæreide Fyllingen

Right wing

- 4 (Norway) Tobias Holm
- 98 (Norway) Øystein Mostad

Left wing

- 3 (Norway) Iben Hvidsten
- 20 (Norway) Jon Obrestad Salte

Line players

- 6 (Norway) Sondre Kvamme Skare
- 47 (Norway) Marcus Soltvedt

Back players

- 7 (Norway) Sigve Åkerøy Pettersen
- 9 (Denmark) Rasmus Hedegaard Thaarup Carlsen
- 11 (Norway) Leif-Erik Brenne
- 13 (Norway) Andreas Lervik
- 21 (Norway) Eskil Dahl Reitan
- 23 (Portugal) Miguel Jose Soares Neves
- 24 (Norway) Nicolai Daling
- 25 (Norway) Bjørn Christensen Mathiassen
- 27 (Norway) Kasper Berentsen Dalland
- (Norway) Andreas Holm

=== Transfers ===
Transfers for the 2026–27 season

Joining

Leaving

- (Norway) Ciljan Sagosen (CB) to (Denmark) Bjerringbro-Silkeborg Håndbold
- (Norway) Nicolai Daling (RB) to (Germany) HSV Hamburg
- (Norway) Henrik Ibsen (GK) to (Norway) Elverum Håndball

=== Transfer History ===
Transfers for the 2025–26 season

Joining

Leaving

- (Norway) Eskil Dahl Reitan (CB) to (Denmark) TTH Holstebro
- (Norway) Trym Hamre Johannessen (LP) to (Norway) Ryger Stavanger
