= Halden Topphåndball =

Norwegian handball club

- Full name: Halden Topphåndball
- Founded: 24 April 2011; 15 years ago
- Arena: Halden Arena
- League: REMA 1000-ligaen (men)
- 2024–25: 6th

Halden Topphåndball is a Norwegian handball club from Halden, Norway. It was founded on 24 April 2011.

In the 2013–14 season the team finished 2nd in the 1. divisjon, and thus secured promotion to the Norwegian top league. In the 2017–18 season the club won silver medals in the Norwegian Men's Handball Cup.

In January 2024 the team moved from Remmenhallen to Halden Arena.

== Team ==
=== Current squad ===
Squad for the 2026–27 season

Goalkeepers
Left Wingers
Right Wingers
Line players

Left Backs
Central Backs
Right Backs

=== Transfers ===
Transfers for the 2026–27 season

Joining

Leaving

- (Norway) Kristian Turmo Lornstad (LP) to (Romania) CS Minaur Baia Mare
