= Fjellhammer IL =

Norwegian handball club

Fjellhammer Idrettslag
- Full name: Fjellhammer Idrettslag
- Short name: Fjellhammer IL
- Founded: 22 October 1931; 95 years ago
- Arena: Fjellhamar Arena
- Capacity: 1,700
- Head coach: Glenn Solberg; Robert Hedin (men)
- League: REMA 1000-ligaen (men); REMA 1000-ligaen (women)
- 2024–25 2025–26: 10th (men); 12th (women)
- Club colours
Home	Away

Fjellhammer IL (Fjellhammer Idrettslag) is a Norwegian handball club from Lørenskog. They play their home matches at Fjellhamar Arena. The club was founded on 22 October 1931. They have won the Norwegian Men's Handball Cup three times; in 1978, 1979 and 1981. Their best ever league position was a 2nd-place finish in 1983–84.

Both the men's and women's team play in the top division, after the women's team was promoted to REMA 1000-ligaen in 2025.

== Achievements (men's handball) ==
- Norwegian Cup:
  - Winner: 1977/78, 1978/79, 1980/81

== Women's handball ==
The women's handball team currently compete in REMA 1000-ligaen, since their promotion in 2025.

=== Current squad ===
Squad for the 2026–27 season

Goalkeeper

- 12 (Norway) Zaynab Elmrani
- 37 (Sweden) Ida Wall Bakken

Wingers
LW

- 2 (Norway) My Lervold
- 18 (Norway) Linnea Isabel Ingeborg Aula

RW

- 20 (Norway) Hedda Klippen Nilsen
- 00 (Norway) Madelen Fjell Gjeisklid

Line players

- 6 (Norway) Tuva Knai
- 22 (Norway) Sunniva Sogn-Johansen

Back players
LB

- 15 (Norway) Christina Midtdal Nummestad
- 27 (Norway) Marthe Bjørnson Ulvåknippa
- 33 (Norway) Mathilde Aas Fjelddalen

CB

- 4 (Norway) Martine Tveter
- 9 (Norway) Hannah Deari Solheim
- 72 (Norway) Stine Mellemstrand Bore

RB

- 14 (Norway) Sarah Deari Solheim
- 25 (Norway) Emma Egge Edner

=== Transfers ===
Transfers for the 2026–27 season.

Joining

- (Norway) Christina Midtdal Nummestad (LB) (from own rows)
- (Norway) Madelen Fjell Gjeisklid (RW) (from (Norway) Ullensaker/Kisa IL)

Leaving

- (Norway) Mia Lundberg Lersbryggen (LB) (to (Norway) Bækkelagets SK)
- (Norway) Sara Ashuri (LW) (retires)
- (Norway) Marie Elstrand Munthe (RB) (retires)
- (Norway) Julie Rensmoen Benterud (RW) (retires)
- (Norway) Inga Sandvold (P) (retires)

=== Technical staff ===
- Head coach: Michael Bech Rehnquist
- Assistant coach: Tarjei Gundersen Sundal

=== Notable former players ===
- (Norway) Tine Kristiansen
- (Norway) Kine Kristiansen
- (Norway) Unni Nyhamar Hinkel
- (Norway) Camilla Carstens
- (Norway) Hæge Fagerhus
