= Bodø HK =

Norwegian handball team

- Full name: Bodø Håndballklubb
- Short name: BHK
- Founded: 9 November 1953; 72 years ago
- Arena: Bodø Spektrum
- Capacity: 5,500
- President: Barbro Stavang Erdahl
- Head coach: Børge Lund
- League: GRUNDIGligaen
- 2024-25: 4th
- Club colours

Bodø Håndballklubb, more commonly known as Bodø HK is a Norwegian handball team located in Bodø. Their home matches are played at Bodø Spektrum. They compete in 1. Divisjon.

They played in the top Norwegian league from 2007 to 2010 and again from 2012 to 2019. Their best result ever is the 2014-15 season, where they finished 2nd in both the league and the cup. In the 2018-19 and 2019-20 the team was relegated twice in a row to the Norwegian 2nd Division. Then the 2020-21 season was cancelled due to Covid-19. In the 2022-23 season they were promoted to the 1st Division again, by going undefeated in the league.

== European record ==
Season	Competition	Round	Club	1st leg	2nd leg	Aggregate
2016–17	EHF Cup	R1	(Hungary) Csurgói KK	21–28	23–19	44–47

== Team ==
=== Current squad ===
Squad for the 2018–19 season

Goalkeepers (GK)

- 1 (Norway) Trygve-johan Fresvik Jensen
- 16 (Denmark) Simon Sejr Jensen

Left Wingers (LW)

- 3 (Norway) Joachim Tennes
- 5 (Norway) Gustav Halvorsen

Right Wingers (RW)

- 6 (Norway) Håvard Benjaminsen
- 20 (Norway) Preben Egeli
- 75 (Sweden) Andrius Mikko

Pivots (P)

- 7 (Croatia) Matko Rotim
- 13 (Norway) Jonas Ask Kristoffersen
- 15 (Norway) Sverre Andreassen Bjørbæk

Left Backs (LB)

- 24 (Norway) Henrik Bielenberg
- 25 (Norway) Sturle Erland

Central Backs (CB)

- 9 (Serbia) Djordje Djekic
- 13 (Norway) Erik Nordskag

Right Backs (RB)

- 23 (Norway) Erlend Sund
- 40 (Norway) Daniel Jakobsen

=== Transfers ===
Transfers for the 2026–27 season

Joining

- (Denmark) Rasmus Qualmann Andersen (LB) from (Denmark) Fredericia HK

Leaving

=== Transfer History ===
Transfers for the 2025–26 season

Joining

- (Norway) Endre Langaas (LP) from (Norway) Elverum Håndball

Leaving
