= Kolstad Håndball =

Norwegian handball club

- Full name: Kolstad Håndball
- Short name: Kolstad
- Founded: 5 October 1972; 54 years ago
- Arena: Kolstad Arena, Trondheim (national league and cup, EHF Champions League)
- Capacity: 2,500 (Kolstad Arena)
- President: Jostein Sivertsen
- Head coach: Stian Gomo; Christian Berge
- League: Elkjøp-ligaen (men's handball)-ligaen (men's handball)
- 2024–25: 2nd
- Club colours

Kolstad Håndball is a Norwegian professional handball club based in Trondheim, that compete in top division of Norwegian handball, the REMA 1000-ligaen. Their home grounds is the Kolstad Arena and Trondheim Spektrum, which has a seating capacity of 2,500 and 8,900 spectators. With substantial new investment, the club has ambitions to become Norway's top team by 2024.

Kolstad is the first handball club in Norway to have won the treble two seasons in a row.

== History ==
Kolstad Håndball is from the city part of Kolstad/Saupstad in Trondheim and was founded on the 5 October 1972, along with the rest of the multi-sports club Kolstad IL. In 2005, a senior team was established on the men's side. Between 2012 and 2015, Kolstad's senior team developed rapidly, which resulted in Kolstad having their men's team in the Norwegian top division for the first time in their history from 2015. Since promotion, Kolstad has had record attendances at its home games, and was named Organiser of the Year for the 2015–16 season.

=== Continental ambitions and economic troubles ===
In 2021, the club secured grocery chain REMA 1000 as their main sponsor, allowing them to secure the signings of a number of star international players, including the THW Kiel centre-back Sander Sagosen. Norway head coach Christian Berge began his role at the club in March 2022. They began the 2022–23 season by defeating fellow Norwegian side Drammen HK 57–47 on aggregate in the first qualifying round of the EHF European League. In the second qualifying round, they lost 61–60 to Bidasoa Irun. In 2022–23 Kolstad won their first Norwegian cup title, beating archrival Elverum in the final 34–27. In the Norwegian League, they finished first in the regular series, and then also won the final in the playoffs against archrival Elverum.

In the following years they won the Norwegian Championship and Cup several times, and played in the EHF Champions League. The club did however announce multiple years with economic deficits, despite growing revenues. In 2023 a number of key players had to agree to lower their wages to keep the club afloat, and in 2025 a deficit of 8 million Norwegian Kroner forced them to stop signing international players. Additionally, some of their star players left the club such as Sander Sagosen, who left for Danish Aalborg Håndbold. In May 2026 they received a point deduction of 2 points for the 2026-27 season due to insufficient capital.

== Crest, colours, supporters ==
=== Kit manufacturers ===
Period	Kit manufacturer
2015–2022	(England) Umbro
2022–present	(Germany) PUMA

=== Kits ===
HOME

2016–17

AWAY
2024-25

== Achievements ==
- Norwegian League
  - Winner: (2) 2022/23, 2023/24
- Norwegian Cup:
  - Winner: (3) 2022/23, 2023/24, 2024/25
- Norwegian League Playoffs
  - Winner: (4) 2022/23, 2023/24, 2024/2025, 2025/2026

== Support ==
The club's supporters group is called Sørsia fanclub, and is an independent club established in 2023.

=== Rivalries ===
Kolstad's main rival is Elverum Håndball.

== Team ==
=== Current squad ===
Squad for the 2025–26 season

Goalkeepers

- 1 (Iceland) Sigurjón Guðmundsson
- 16 (Denmark) Nicolai Neupart

Left wings

- 7 (Norway) Adrian Aalberg
- 17 (Norway) Magnus Stølefjell

Right wings

- 48 (Iceland) Sigvaldi Guðjónsson
- 72 (Norway) Erlend Johnsen

Line players

- 6 (Sweden) Adam Blanche
- 14 (Norway) Magnus Gullerud
- 42 (Norway) Martin Hernes Hovde

Left backs

- 4 (Norway) Vetle Eck Aga (c)
- 22 (Sweden) Simon Jeppsson
- 23 (Norway) Gøran Johannessen

Centre backs

- 9 (Iceland) Benedikt Gunnar Óskarsson
- 21 (Norway) Leon Owrenn Bronken

Right backs

- 2 (Norway) Sondre Mikal Solheim
- 3 (Norway) Emre Christoffer Berge
- 10 (Norway) Magnus Søndenå

=== Transfers ===
Transfers for the 2026–27 season

Joining

- (Norway) Mishels Liaba (LB) from (Sweden) Önnereds HK
- (Norway) Vemund Norheim Ask (LB) from (Norway) ØIF Arendal
- (Norway) Sondre Orheim (GK) from (Norway) Bækkelagets SK
- (Norway) Vetle Bore (LB) from (Norway) Nærbø Håndball
- (Norway) Mikkel Vestli (LP) from (Norway) Follo HK

Leaving

- (Iceland) Sigvaldi Guðjónsson (RW) to (Germany) TSV Hannover-Burgdorf
- (Iceland) Benedikt Gunnar Óskarsson (CB) to (Denmark) TTH Holstebro
- (Norway) Martin Hovde (LP) to (Germany) HSV Hamburg
- (Norway) Magnus Søndenå (RB) to (France) Pays d'Aix Université Club
- (Iceland) Sigurjón Guðmundsson (GK) (to ?)

=== Transfer History ===
Transfers for the 2025–26 season

Joining

- (Sweden) Andreas Palicka (GK) (from (France) Paris Saint-Germain Handball)
- (Denmark) Nicolai Neupart (GK) (from (Norway) Halden Topphåndball)
- (Sweden) Adam Blanche (LP) (from (Sweden) IK Sävehof)
- (Norway) Sondre Mikal Solheim (RB) (from (Norway) Bækkelagets SK) effective immediately

Leaving

- (Iceland) Sveinn Jóhannsson (LP) to (France) Chambéry Savoie
- (Norway) Torbjørn Bergerud (GK) to (Poland) Wisła Płock
- (Norway) Lars Eggen Rismark (GK) (retires)
- (Norway) Ruben Meder (LP) (to (Norway) Halden Topphåndball)
- (Iceland) Arnór Snær Óskarsson (RB) (to (Iceland) Valur) effective immediately
- (Norway) Simen Lyse (LB) (to (France) Paris Saint-Germain Handball) effective immediately
- (Sweden) Andreas Palicka (GK) (to (Germany) HSG Wetzlar) effective immediately

=== Technical staff ===
- Head coach: Christian Berge
- Head coach: Stian Gomo

=== Notable former national team players ===
- (Norway) Steffen Stegavik
- (Norway) Tom Kåre Nikolaisen
- (Norway) Gabriel Setterblom
- (Norway) Magnus Abelvik Rød
- (Norway) Sander Sagosen
- (Norway) Torbjørn Bergerud
- (Norway) Simen Lyse
- (Iceland) Janus Daði Smárason
- (Sweden) Andreas Palicka

=== Notable former club players ===
- (Norway) Eskil Dahl Reitan
- (Norway) Sander Sæterhaug Rønning
- (Norway) Magnus Langeland
- (Norway) Thomas Boilesen

=== Notable former coaches ===
- (Norway) Sven-Tore Jacobsen

== Kolstad Arena ==
Kolstad Arena is the home ground to Kolstad Håndball.

- Name: – Kolstad Arena
- City: – Trondheim
- Built: – 2018
- Capacity: – 2,500 spectators
