= 1. divisjon (Norwegian handball) =

Norwegian handball league

- No. of teams: 14
- Country: Norway
- Confederation: EHF
- Most recent champions: Follo HK Damer (women); TIF Viking (men) (2022/23)
- Level on pyramid: 2
- Promotion to: REMA 1000-ligaen (women); REMA 1000-ligaen (men)
- Relegation to: 2. divisjon
- Website: handball.no
- 2022-23

1. divisjon is the name of the second highest handball league for both genders in Norway. The two best placed teams win promotion to REMA 1000-ligaen for men and REMA 1000-ligaen for women, while the bottom finishers get relegated to the Norwegian 2. divisjon. The division consists of 14 teams that meet each opponent once away and once at home.

Follo HK Damer are the defending champions for women, and TIF Viking are the defending champions for men, and they both play in REMA 1000-ligaen for women and REMA 1000-ligaen for men in the current season.

== Women 2022/23 ==
Team	Location	Arena	Finished pos. in last season
Charlottenlund SK	Trondheim	CSK Varmbo arena	7th
Fjellhammer IL	Lørenskog	Lørenskoghallen	6th
Flint Tønsberg	Tønsberg	REMA 1000 Arena	13th (in REMA 1000-ligaen)
Follo HK Damer	Ski	Stil Arena	14th (in REMA 1000-ligaen)
Fyllingen	Bergen	Framohallen	1st (in 2. divisjon - 03)
Gjerpen HK Skien	Gjerpen	Gjerpenhallen	2nd
Glassverket	Drammen	Drammenshallen	8th (Note: As Reistad, since Glassverket took over Reistad's license in 1. divisjon.)
Bærum Haslum Damer	Bærum	Nadderud Arena	3rd
Junkeren	Bodø	Stordalshallen	1st (in 2. divisjon - 01)
Larvik Turn	Larvik	Farrishallen	1st (in 2. divisjon - 02)
Levanger HK	Levanger	Trønderhallen	4th
Nordstrand	Nordstrand	Nordstrand Arena	5th
Oppsal	Oslo	Oppsal Arena	12th (in REMA 1000-ligaen)
Storhamar	Hamar	Boligpartner Arena	1st (in 2. divisjon - 04)

== Promotion to the League ==
The two best placed teams of the league ensures direct promotion to the premier handball league for Norwegian handball clubs. The third best placed team play a best of three qualification matches against the team who ended as No. 12 in REMA 1000-ligaen for men and REMA 1000-ligaen for women. The winner of these matches will play the next season in the premier league and the loser will play in 1. divisjon.

== Relegation ==
Teams who end the season as #'s 13 and 14 will be directly relegated to 2. divisjon.

== See also ==
- Handball
- REMA 1000-ligaen (women's handball)
- REMA 1000-ligaen (men's handball)
