= Elverum Håndball =

Norwegian handball club

- Full name: Elverum Håndball
- Short name: Elverum
- Founded: 1946; 80 years ago
- Arena: Terningen Arena
- Capacity: 2,500
- President: Ida Borg
- Head coach: Børge Lund
- League: Eliteserien
- 2024-25: 1st
Home	Away

Elverum Håndball is a Norwegian professional handball club from Elverum Municipality, Norway. Currently, Elverum Håndball competes in the Norwegian Premier League Men's Handball, and they have been successful title winners for several years consecutively. The club was founded in 1946 by a group of 26 people. The Norway national team coach, Christian Berge, was coach for Elverum Håndball from 2008 to 2014 which he had to leave in order to coach the Norway men's national team.

== Support ==
The club's supporters group is called Taiga'n fanclub, and is an independent club established in 2006.

=== Rivalries ===
Elverum's main rivals are Kolstad Håndball and ØIF Arendal.

== Kits ==
HOME

2020–21

AWAY
2019–20	2020–

== Achievements ==
- Norwegian League
  - Winner: 2012/13, 2016/17, 2017/18, 2019/20, 2020/21, 2021/22, 2024/25
  - Silver: 2018/19, 2022/23, 2023/24
- Norwegian League Playoffs
  - Winner: 1994/95, 2007/08, 2011/12, 2012/13, 2013/14, 2014/15, 2015/16, 2016/17, 2017/18, 2018/19, 2021/22
- Norwegian Cup:
  - Winner: 2009/10, 2018, 2019, 2020, 2021
  - Finalist: 1962 (outdoors), 1963, 1965, 2008, 2012, 2016, 2022/23, 2023/24, 2024

== Team ==
=== Current squad ===
Squad for the 2025–26 season

Goalkeepers

- 1 (Sweden) Rickard Frisk
- 12 (Norway) Marius Bakkedal-Andersen
- 24 (Norway) Vegard Bakken Øien

Wingers
LW

- 3 (Algeria) Mounir Chehri
- 21 (Norway) Eirik Kulvedrøsten Soløst

RW

- 6 (Norway) Simen Søgaard
- 34 (Norway) Kevin Gulliksen

Line players

- 5 (Denmark) Anders Agger Pedersen
- 13 (Iceland) Tryggvi Thórisson
- 19 (Sweden) Oscar Theodor Uliana Starck
- 20 (Norway) Sondre Gjerdalen
- 32 (Norway) Viljar August Wathne Guttormsen

Back players
LB

- 17 (Norway) Erik Thorsteinsen Toft
- 25 (Norway) Kristian Jakobsen Stranden

CB

- 4 (Norway) Mario Matic
- 11 (Norway) Mikkel Solheim
- 27 (Hungary) Péter Lukács
- 30 (Norway) Einar Johansen

RB

- 23 (Hungary) Dominik Máthé
- 31 (Norway) Albert Myreng Elverhøy
- 45 (Norway) Benjamin Berg

=== Transfers ===
Transfers for the 2026–27 season

Joining

- (France) Amara Karamoko (LP) from (France) Paris Saint-Germain
- (Denmark) Frederik Pedersen (CB) from (Denmark) GOG Håndbold
- (Norway) Henrik Ibsen (GK) from (Norway) Bergen Håndball
- (Latvia) Valdis Kalniņš (RB) from (Latvia) Murjanu SG

Leaving

- (Hungary) Dominik Máthé (RB) to (North Macedonia) GRK Ohrid
- (Hungary) Péter Lukács (CB) to (Hungary) OTP Bank – Pick Szeged
- (Norway) Kristian Stranden (LB) to (Norway) ØIF Arendal

=== Transfer History ===
Transfers for the 2025–26 season

Joining

- (Algeria) Mounir Chehri (LW) from (Norway) Halden Topphåndball
- (Norway) Mario Matic (CB) from (Greece) AEK Athens
- (Norway) Mikkel Solheim (CB) from (Norway) Follo HK
- (Hungary) Dominik Máthé (RB) (comeback to handball)
- (Norway) Kevin Gulliksen (RW) from (Denmark) TTH Holstebro
- (Norway) Sondre Gjerdalen (P) from (Norway) ØIF Arendal
- (Iceland) Tryggvi Thórisson (P) from (Sweden) IK Sävehof
- (Denmark) Anders Agger Pedersen (P) from (Denmark) TMS Ringsted

Leaving

- (Czech Republic) Šimon Mizera (GK) to (Denmark) TMS Ringsted
- (Norway) Scott Lucian Wolkoff (GK) to (Norway) Bodø HK
- (Norway) Sindre Heldal (LW) to (France) Paris Saint-Germain
- (Denmark) Mathias Larson (CB) to (Germany) Rhein-Neckar Löwen
- (Norway) Håkon Bratvold Ekren (CB) Retires
- (Norway) Patrick Helland Anderson (RB) to (Denmark) Aalborg Håndbold
- (Norway) Kasper Lien (RW) to (Germany) TVB Stuttgart
- (Norway) Endre Langaas (P) to (Norway) Bodø HK
- (Norway) Kristian Hübert Larsen (P) to (Denmark) Fredericia HK

=== Notable players ===
- Arnulf Bæk
- Christian Berge
- Ingimundur Ingimundarson
- Lazo Majnov
- Stig Rasch
- Steffen Stegavik
- Tamás Iváncsik
- Sigvaldi Guðjónsson
- Lukas Sandell
- Luc Abalo

== European record ==
Season	Competition	Round	Club	1st leg	2nd leg	Aggregate
2016–17	EHF Champions League	Group stage	(France) Montpellier	32–31	24–31	5th place
2016–17	EHF Champions League	Group stage	(Spain) Logroño	27–32	21–28	5th place
2016–17	EHF Champions League	Group stage	(North Macedonia) Metalurg Skopje	26–31	17–18	5th place
2016–17	EHF Champions League	Group stage	(Slovakia) HT Tatran Prešov	24–24	27–25	5th place
2016–17	EHF Champions League	Group stage	(Russia) Chekhovskiye Medvedi	28–28	31–26	5th place
2017–18	EHF Champions League	Group stage	(Denmark) Skjern Håndbold	27–32	25–35	4th place
2017–18	EHF Champions League	Group stage	(Spain) CB Ademar León	25–30	30–26	4th place
2017–18	EHF Champions League	Group stage	(Slovenia) RK Gorenje Velenje	29–28	21–30	4th place
2017–18	EHF Champions League	Group stage	(Switzerland) Kadetten Schaffhausen	26–22	30–36	4th place
2017–18	EHF Champions League	Group stage	(Romania) Dinamo București	40–32	34–33	4th place
2018–19	EHF Champions League	Group stage	(Romania) CS Dinamo București	29–28	24–26	3rd place
2018–19	EHF Champions League	Group stage	(Poland) Wisła Płock	28–30	28–30	3rd place
2018–19	EHF Champions League	Group stage	(Spain) CB Ademar León	30–25	24–24	3rd place
2018–19	EHF Champions League	Group stage	(Finland) Riihimäki Cocks	28–27	28–25	3rd place
2018–19	EHF Champions League	Group stage	(Switzerland) Wacker Thun	29–28	30–29	3rd place
2019–20	EHF Champions League	Group stage	(France) Paris Saint-Germain	22–25	25–31	8th place
2019–20	EHF Champions League	Group stage	(Spain) Barça	24–33	24–33	8th place
2019–20	EHF Champions League	Group stage	(Germany) SG Flensburg-Handewitt	19–26	28–34	8th place
2019–20	EHF Champions League	Group stage	(Denmark) Aalborg Håndbold	24–34	28–30	8th place
2019–20	EHF Champions League	Group stage	(Hungary) MOL-Pick Szeged	25–26	25–32	8th place
2019–20	EHF Champions League	Group stage	(Croatia) PPD Zagreb	30–30	27–30	8th place
2019–20	EHF Champions League	Group stage	(Slovenia) RK Celje	25–32	37–26	8th place
2020–21	EHF Champions League	Group stage	(North Macedonia) Vardar 1961	34–34	32–35	8th place
2020–21	EHF Champions League	Group stage	(France) Paris Saint-Germain	29–44	29–35	8th place
2020–21	EHF Champions League	Group stage	(Poland) PGE Vive Kielce	22–31	29–39	8th place
2020–21	EHF Champions League	Group stage	(Portugal) Porto Sofarma	31–38	30–28	8th place
2020–21	EHF Champions League	Group stage	(Hungary) MOL-Pick Szeged	0–10	27–36	8th place
2020–21	EHF Champions League	Group stage	(Belarus) Meshkov Brest	33–31	27–29	8th place
2020–21	EHF Champions League	Group stage	(Germany) SG Flensburg Handewitt	29–30	35–37	8th place
2021–22	EHF Champions League	Group stage	(North Macedonia) Vardar 1961	27–27	30–39	6th place
2021–22	EHF Champions League	Group stage	(Germany) THW Kiel	30–31	36–41	6th place
2021–22	EHF Champions League	Group stage	(Croatia) PPD Zagreb	30–25	27–27	6th place
2021–22	EHF Champions League	Group stage	(Hungary) MOL-Pick Szeged	24–27	34–30	6th place
2021–22	EHF Champions League	Group stage	(Belarus) Meshkov Brest	32–33	30–27	6th place
2021–22	EHF Champions League	Group stage	(France) Montpellier Handball	30–37	32–39	6th place
2021–22	EHF Champions League	Group stage	(Denmark) Aalborg Håndbold	28–34	27–32	6th place
2021–22	EHF Champions League	Playoffs	(France) Paris Saint-Germain	30–30	30–37	60–67
2022–23	EHF Champions League	Group stage	(Germany) THW Kiel	26–26	26–36	8th place
2022–23	EHF Champions League	Group stage	(Denmark) Aalborg Håndbold	25–33	24–31	8th place
2022–23	EHF Champions League	Group stage	(France) HBC Nantes	36–42	30–41	8th place
2022–23	EHF Champions League	Group stage	(Spain) Barça	30–46	30–40	8th place
2022–23	EHF Champions League	Group stage	(Hungary) OTP Bank - Pick Szeged	32–34	23–30	8th place
2022–23	EHF Champions League	Group stage	(Slovenia) Celje Pivovarna Laško	31–29	26–29	8th place
2022–23	EHF Champions League	Group stage	(Poland) Barlinek Industria Kielce	26–27	33–37	8th place
2023–24	EHF European League	Group stage	(Germany) SG Flensburg-Handewitt	32–33	35–38	3rd place
2023–24	EHF European League	Group stage	(Switzerland) Kadetten Schaffhausen	31–27	30–32	3rd place
2023–24	EHF European League	Group stage	(Montenegro) RK Lovćen	37–25	27–26	3rd place
2024–25	EHF European League	Qualification round	(Germany) MT Melsungen	31–36	23–28	54–64
2025–26	EHF European League	Qualification round	(Spain) Bathco BM Torrelavega	38–28	29–28	67–56
2025–26	EHF European League	Group stage	(Switzerland) HC Kriens-Luzern	31–34	38–34	2nd place
2025–26	EHF European League	Group stage	(Iceland) Knattspyrnufélagið Fram	40–25	35–29	2nd place
2025–26	EHF European League	Group stage	(Portugal) FC Porto	25–29	31–29	2nd place
2025–26	EHF European League	Main round	(Spain) Fraikin BM Granollers	37–28	29–27	2nd place
2025–26	EHF European League	Main round	(Denmark) SAH - Skanderborg	31–24	25–32	2nd place
2025–26	EHF European League	Play-offs	(France) Montpellier Handball	35–31	24–36	59–67
