= IL Runar =

Norwegian sports club

- Full name: Idrettslaget Runar
- Founded: 7 January 1949; 77 years ago
- Ground: Haukerød idrettsplass (stadium); Runarhallen (indoor arena); Sandefjord

Idrettslaget Runar is a Norwegian sports club from Haukerød in Sandefjord. It has sections for athletics, handball, football, and cross-country skiing. It was established on January 7, 1949.

== Athletics ==
Its athletics section is known for its prominent long-distance runners. Olympic competitors Gunhild Halle Haugen and Marius Bakken represented IL Runar, and so did Susanne Wigene for a limited period. Local rivals in both handball and athletics are Sandefjord TIF.

== Handball ==
The men's handball team currently plays in the first league of Norwegian handball, and was relegated from the first league in 2006–07 season, but they soon returned to the first league again. Runar won the highest league in the seasons 1993–94, 1994–95, 1995–96 and 1999–00. They also won the Limburgse Handbal Dagen in 1998, where they defeated Sporting Toulouse 31 with 29–28 in the final.

== Football ==
IL Runar Fotball
- League: 4. divisjon (Vestfold)
- 2018: 4. divisjon (Vestfold), 5th of 11
Home colours

The men's football team currently plays in the 4. divisjon, the fifth tier of the Norwegian football league system. They have never played in the top tier, but had its last stint in the 1. divisjon (second tier) in 1997, with players like Morten Fevang who later became a significant player in the top division and captain of Odd Grenland. In late 1998, Runar formed the elite football team Sandefjord Fotball with local rivals Sandefjord BK, in an attempt to take Sandefjord back to the top level of football in Norway. The plan succeeded, as Sandefjord Fotball, as of the 2019 season, have been playing in the top flight in 7 out of the last 14 seasons.

=== Recent men's football seasons ===
Season		Pos.	Pl.	W	D	L	GS	GA	P	Cup	Notes	Ref.
2013	3. divisjon	10	26	10	2	14	63	82	32	Second qualifying round		
2014	3. divisjon	↓ 13	26	6	4	16	42	93	22	Second qualifying round		
2015	4. divisjon	9	20	7	3	10	50	52	24	First round		
2016	4. divisjon	7	22	7	4	11	57	62	25	dnq		
2017	4. divisjon	4	18	9	4	5	46	28	31	dnq		
2018	4. divisjon	5	20	7	5	8	43	53	26	First qualifying round		
