= Sandefjord TIF =

Norwegian sports club

- Full name: Sandefjord Turn- og Idrettsforening
- Founded: March 30, 2011; 13 years ago
- Arena: Jotunhallen, Sandefjord
- Capacity: 1000
- League: REMA 1000-ligaen

Sandefjord Turn- og Idrettsforening is a sports club in Sandefjord, Norway. The club has activities in basketball, handball, orienteering, athletics, skiing, volleyball, gymnastics and children's allsports.

Its local rival is IL Runar.

== Handball ==
The handball club is known as Sandefjord Håndball, and was founded on March 30th 2011. The men team won the 2005-2006 Norwegian national league. They were relegated in 2010 after finishing 10th and losing the playoff matches to Oppsal.

After a year in the second tier, the two clubs met again in the promotion/relegation playoff with roles reversed. Oppsal won again, but withdrew from the Handball league, and therefore Sandefjord was promoted.
