= Haslum HK =

Norwegian handball club

- Full name: Haslum Håndballklubb
- Founded: 1 May 1999; 26 years ago
- Arena: Nadderud Arena
- Capacity: 2,050
- Head coach: Ole-Jacob Borch
- League: Eliteserien
Home	Away

Haslum Håndballklubb or Haslum HK is a handball club from Haslum, Norway. They are the handball department of the multisports club Haslum Idrettslag. They currently compete in the Eliteserien.

They moved to their current arena, Nadderud Arena, in February 2015.

== Team ==
=== Current squad ===
Squad for the 2025–26 season

Goalkeepers
Left Wingers
Right Wingers
Line players

Left Backs
Central Backs
Right Backs

=== Transfers ===
Transfers for the 2025–26 season

Joining

Leaving

- (Norway) David Valderhaug (LB) to (Spain) CB Cangas
- (Norway) Kasper Bjanes Iversen (RW) to (Norway) Runar Sandefjord
- (Norway) Even Haugli (LW) to (Norway) Runar Sandefjord
- (Norway) Herman Solberg (CB) to (Norway) Runar Sandefjord

== Domestic record ==
- Cup winner: 2004/05, 2010/11, 2011/12, 2016/17
- Cup finalist: 2003/04, 2005/06, 2019/20
- League winner: 2010/11, 2011/12, 2013/14
- League second place: 2004/05, 2012/13, 2015/16
- League third place: 2003/04, 2006/07, 2007/08, 2014/15

== European record ==
Season	Competition	Round	Club	1st leg	2nd leg	Aggregate
2016-17	Challenge Cup	R3	(Iceland) Valur	24–31	25–25	49–56
