= Sando (surname) =

Sando or Sandø is a surname, and may refer to

- Emily Stang Sando (born 1989), Norwegian handball player
- Frank Sando (1931–2012), British long-distance runner
- Joe Sando (1923–2011), American Jemez Pueblo historian of Pueblos
- John Petter Sando (born 1961), Norwegian handball player
- Stein Olaf Sando (born 1968), Norwegian handball player
- Stefano De Sando (born 1954), Italian actor and voice actor
- Toralf Sandø (1899–1970), Norwegian film director and actor
- Varney Sando (born 1995), Liberian footballer
- Waage Sandø (born 1943), Danish actor

== See also ==
- Sandow
