= Tresse =

Tresse (plural: tresses) may refer to:

- a word borrowed from French, meaning tress, braided, plait or lace, as found in Lady's tresses; orchids in the genus Spiranthes; or a Swiss plaited bread
- Tresse cheese, a form of string cheese originating in Syria
- John Tresse, a Norwegian handball player and coach
- Tresses, a commune in the Gironde department in Nouvelle-Aquitaine in southwestern France

== See also ==
- Tressé, a commune in the Ille-et-Vilaine department of Brittany in northwestern metropolitan France
- Tress (disambiguation)
