= Norway men's national handball team =

Represents Norway at international handball competitions

Norway

Information
- Nickname: Håndballgutta (The handball boys)
- Association: Norwegian Handball Federation
- Coach: Magnus Andersson
- Assistant coach: Henrik Kronborg
- Captain: Torbjørn Bergerud
- Most caps: Bjarte Myrhol (263)
- Most goals: Sander Sagosen (956)

Colours
1st	2nd	3rd

Results

Summer Olympics
- Appearances: 3 (First in 1972)
- Best result: 6th (2024)

World Championship
- Appearances: 18 (First in 1958)
- Best result: (silver) 2nd (2017, 2019)

European Championship
- Appearances: 12 (First in 2000)
- Best result: 3rd (2020)
- Last updated on Unknown.

Norway men's national handball team
Medal record

World Championship
Silver medal – second place	2017 France	
Silver medal – second place	2019 Germany/Denmark	

European Championship
Bronze medal – third place	2020 Sweden/Austria/Norway	

Team roster in 2026 November

The Norway men's national handball team represents Norway at international handball competitions, and is governed by Norges Håndballforbund (NHF). As of 2026, Norway has been in two finals and won three medals. The most successful era of men's Norwegian handball team was between 2015 and 2020, led by former coach Christian Berge and star player Sander Sagosen. In that period, they won two silver medals at the World Championship and played two semifinals of the European Championship winning one bronze medal.

== Honours ==
Competition	1st place, gold medalist(s)	2nd place, silver medalist(s)	3rd place, bronze medalist(s)	Total
Olympic Games	0	0	0	0
World Championship	0	2	0	2
European Championship	0	0	1	1
Total	0	2	1	3

In 2016, they were honored with a Rio 2016 Fair Play Award for great sportsmanship.

== Competitive record ==
=== Olympic Games ===
Olympic record
Games	Round	Position	Pld	W	D	L	GF	GA
(Germany) 1936 Berlin	Did not qualify							
Not held from 1948 to 1968
(West Germany) 1972 Munich	Match for 9th place	9th of 12	5	3	1	1	90	87
(Canada) 1976 Montreal	Did not qualify							
(Soviet Union) 1980 Moscow	Did not qualify							
(United States) 1984 Los Angeles	Did not qualify							
(South Korea) 1988 Seoul	Did not qualify							
(Spain) 1992 Barcelona	Did not qualify							
(United States) 1996 Atlanta	Did not qualify							
(Australia) 2000 Sydney	Did not qualify							
(Greece) 2004 Athens	Did not qualify							
(China) 2008 Beijing	Did not qualify							
(United Kingdom) 2012 London	Did not qualify							
(Brazil) 2016 Rio de Janeiro	Did not qualify							
(Japan) 2020 Tokyo	Quarterfinals	7th of 12	6	3	0	3	161	163
(France) 2024 Paris	Quarterfinals	6th of 12	6	3	0	3	167	169
(United States) 2028 Los Angeles	TBD							
(Australia) 2032 Brisbane	TBD							
Total	3/15	–	17	9	1	7	418	419

=== World Championship ===
World Championship record
Year	Round	Position	GP	W	D	L	GS	GA
(Nazi Germany) 1938	Did not qualify							
(Sweden) 1954	Did not qualify							
(East Germany) 1958	Match for 5th place	6	6	3	0	3	118	102
(West Germany) 1961	Match for 7th place	7	6	2	0	4	73	85
(Czechoslovakia) 1964	Preliminary round	11	3	1	0	2	37	47
(Sweden) 1967	Preliminary round	13	3	0	0	3	44	58
(France) 1970	Preliminary round	13	3	0	0	3	23	28
(East Germany) 1974	Did not qualify							
(Denmark) 1978	Did not qualify							
(West Germany) 1982	Did not qualify							
(Switzerland) 1986	Did not qualify							
(Czechoslovakia) 1990	Did not qualify							
(Sweden) 1993	Preliminary round	13	6	2	2	2	145	123
(Iceland) 1995	Did not qualify							
(Japan) 1997	Round of 16	12	6	1	2	3	132	141
(Egypt) 1999	Preliminary round	13	6	2	1	3	156	162
(France) 2001	Round of 16	14	6	2	1	3	139	155
(Portugal) 2003	Did not qualify							
(Tunisia) 2005	Match for 7th place	7	9	6	1	2	258	219
(Germany) 2007	Match for 13th place	13	6	4	0	2	181	137
(Croatia) 2009	Match for 9th place	9	9	6	0	3	280	232
(Sweden) 2011	Match for 9th place	9	9	5	0	4	259	255
(Spain) 2013	Did not qualify							
(Qatar) 2015	Did not qualify							
(France) 2017	Final	2	9	7	0	2	274	234
(Denmark) (Germany) 2019	Final	2	10	8	0	2	325	256
(Egypt) 2021	Quarterfinals	6	7	5	0	2	219	197
(Poland) (Sweden) 2023	Match for 5th place	6	9	7	0	2	278	233
(Croatia) (Denmark) (Norway) 2025	Main round	10	6	4	0	2	180	147
(Germany) 2027	Qualified							
(France) (Germany) 2029	TBD							
(Denmark) (Iceland) (Norway) 2031	Qualified							
Total	20/32	–	119	65	7	47	3121	2811

=== European Championship ===
Year	Round	Position	GP	W	D	L	GS	GA
(Portugal) 1994	Did not qualify							
(Spain) 1996	Did not qualify							
(Italy) 1998	Did not qualify							
(Croatia) 2000	Match for 7th place	8	6	1	1	4	133	144
(Sweden) 2002	Did not qualify							
(Slovenia) 2004	Did not qualify							
(Switzerland) 2006	Main round	11	6	2	0	4	178	177
(Norway) 2008	Match for 5th place	6	7	2	2	1	196	185
(Austria) 2010	Main round	7	6	3	0	3	169	164
(Serbia) 2012	Preliminary round	13	3	1	0	2	80	87
(Denmark) 2014	Preliminary round	14	3	0	1	2	77	84
(Poland) 2016	Bronze final	4	8	4	1	3	235	232
(Croatia) 2018	Main round	7	6	4	0	2	191	172
(Sweden) (Austria) (Norway) 2020	Bronze final	3	9	8	0	1	273	236
(Hungary) (Slovakia) 2022	Match for 5th place	5	8	6	0	2	246	211
(Germany) 2024	Main round	9	7	3	1	3	208	196
(Denmark) (Sweden) (Norway) 2026	Main round	9	7	3	1	3	224	222
(Spain) (Portugal) (Switzerland) 2028	TBD							
(Czech Republic) (Denmark) (Poland) 2030	TBD							
(France) (Germany) 2032	TBD							
Total	12/20	–	76	38	7	31	2210	2110

* Colored background indicates that medal was won in the tournament.
** Red border color indicates that tournament was held on home soil.

=== Other tournaments ===
- Gjensidige Cup 2019 – Winner
- Gjensidige Cup 2023 – Winner
- Gjensidige Cup 2024 – Winner

== Team ==
=== Current squad ===
The squad for two qualification matches for the 2028 European Men's Handball Championship against Georgia and Turkey in November 2026.

Caps and goals as of 8 November 2026.

Head coach: (Sweden) Magnus Andersson

No.	Pos.	Name	Date of birth (age)	Height	App.	Goals	Club
1	GK	Robin Paulsen Haug	1 September 1998 (age 28)	1.94 m	20	0	(Germany) HSV Hamburg
4	DF	Lasse Balstad	13 January 1994 (age 32)	1.90 m	16	4	(Denmark) GOG Håndbold
7	CB	Sander Øverjordet	8 April 1996 (age 30)	1.91 m	59	60	(Germany) HC Erlangen
9	P	Henrik Jakobsen	16 December 1992 (aged 33)	1.96 m	66	68	(Denmark) Fredericia HK
14	CB	Mario Matic	23 July 1994 (age 32)	1.80 m	22	36	(Norway) Elverum Håndball
15	CB	Tobias Grøndahl	22 January 2001 (age 25)	1.82 m	71	243	(Germany) Füchse Berlin
24	DF	Christian O'Sullivan	22 August 1991 (age 35)	1.90 m	208	300	(Germany) TBV Lemgo
25	P	Martin Hovde	17 December 2001 (age 24)	2.01 m	15	27	(Germany) HSV Hamburg
27	RB	Harald Reinkind	17 August 1992 (age 34)	1.97 m	180	400	(Germany) THW Kiel
30	GK	Torbjørn Bergerud (c)	16 July 1994 (age 32)	2.00 m	181	0	(Denmark) Fredericia HK
31	RW	Kasper Lien	15 April 2001 (age 25)	1.94 m	46	85	(Germany) TVB Stuttgart
40	LW	August Pedersen	24 June 1994 (age 32)	1.80 m	33	134	(Germany) TSV Hannover-Burgdorf
43	LB	Simen Lyse	1 February 2000 (age 26)	1.95 m	54	159	(France) Paris Saint-Germain
44	RW	Kevin Gulliksen	9 November 1996 (age 30)	1.79 m	118	218	(Norway) Elverum Håndball
71	LW	Alexander Blonz	17 April 2000 (age 26)	1.89 m	112	288	(Denmark) Aalborg Håndbold
77	RB	Magnus Abelvik Rød	7 July 1997 (age 29)	2.04 m	104	265	(Hungary) OTP Bank-Pick Szeged
91	RB	Patrick Helland Anderson	8 December 2004 (age 21)	1.93 m	22	80	(Denmark) Aalborg Håndbold
98	GK	Emil Kheri Imsgard	6 March 1998 (age 28)	1.97 m	11	0	(Denmark) Nordsjælland Håndbold

=== Extended squad / recent call-ups ===
No.	Pos.	Name	Date of birth (age)	Height	App.	Goals	Club
3	DF	Vetle Eck Aga	4 October 1993 (age 33)	1.90 m	86	4	(Norway) Kolstad Håndball
10	DF	Vetle Rønningen	13 May 1998 (age 28)	2.04 m	18	3	(Denmark) Aalborg Håndbold
6	LW	Sebastian Barthold	27 August 1991 (age 35)	1.85 m	106	270	(Denmark) Mors-Thy Håndbold
12	GK	Kristian Sæverås	22 June 1996 (age 30)	1.94 m	94	3	(Germany) Frisch Auf Göppingen
16	GK	Sander Heieren	23 October 1998 (age 28)	1.95 m	9	0	(Denmark) Fredericia HK
17	LW	Sindre Heldal	10 February 1999 (age 27)	1.82 m	6	12	(Portugal) Benfica
20	P	Sondre Gjerdalen	30 August 1999 (age 27)	1.95 m	7	9	(Norway) Elverum Håndball
22	CB	Ciljan Sagosen	13 December 2007 (age 18)	1.82 m	1	1	(Denmark) Bjerringbro-Silkeborg
32	P	Thomas Solstad	26 February 1997 (age 29)	1.94 m	60	101	(Denmark) HØJ Elite
36	GK	André Kristensen	15 March 2000 (age 26)	1.92 m	17	0	(Portugal) Sporting CP
41	P	Karl Wallevik	2 September 2005 (age 21)	1.99 m	1	2	(Norway) Bergen Håndball
42	RB	Gabriel Setterblom	22 November 1997 (age 28)	1.95 m	18	34	(Denmark) SønderjyskE
45	RB	Simen Schønningsen	21 February 1996 (age 30)	1.91 m	17	24	(Denmark) HØJ Elite
46	RW	Kasper Bjanes Iversen	12 May 2004 (age 22)	1.92 m	1	1	(Norway) Runar Sandefjord
47	RB	Lasse Sunde Lid	7 June 2004 (age 22)	2.01 m	1	5	(Denmark) Bjerringbro-Silkeborg
48	RW	Aksel Horgen	29 May 1996 (age 30)	1.86 m	5	14	(Germany) SG Flensburg-Handewitt

=== Inaccessible at the moment ===
No.	Pos.	Name	Date of birth (age)	Height	App.	Goals	Club
5	CB	Sander Sagosen ^{INJ}	14 September 1995 (age 31)	1.95 m	197	956	(Denmark) Aalborg Håndbold
18	LB	William Aar ^{INJ}	23 October 1997 (age 29)	1.99 m	34	47	(Denmark) TTH Holstebro
29	CB	Magnus Fredriksen ^{INJ}	24 May 1997 (age 29)	1.88 m	39	22	(Denmark) SønderjyskE

Notes

- ^{INJ} = Injured
- ^{PRS} = Preliminary squad
- ^{RET} = Retired from the national team
- ^{SBY} = Standby player
- ^{TOP} = Train-on player

=== Coaching staff ===
Role	Name
Head coach	(Sweden) Magnus Andersson
Assistant coach	(Denmark) Henrik Kronborg
Goalkeeping coach	(Sweden) Mats Olsson
Physical trainer	(Norway) Eirik Haukali
Doctor	(Norway) Thomas Torgalsen
Physiotherapist	(Norway) Harald Markussen
Masseur	(Norway) Geir Stølsvik
Team administrator	(Norway) Gry Hege Knudsen
Team administrator	(Norway) Ragnhild Oulie Bruland
Head leader	(Norway) Ingrid Blindheim
Mentor	(Sweden) Tjolle Ström
Talent coach	(Denmark) Claus Dalgaard-Hansen
Mental coach	(Norway) Erik Hofseth
Social media	(Norway) Finn Aagaard

=== Past squads ===
1958 World Men's Handball Championship (6th place)

Oddvar Klepperås, Erik Vellan, Finn Arne Johansen, Knut Reese Larsen, Ivar Sandboe, Jonny Hovde, Jon Narvestad, Roy Yssen, Jan Flatla, Rolf Rustad, Kjell Svestad, John Tresse, Agnar Hagen, Odd Nielsen, Hans Lien.

Coach:

1961 World Men's Handball Championship (7th place)

Kai Killerud, Knut Strøm, Finn Arne Johansen, Knut Reese Larsen, Kaj Ringlund, Bjørn Erik Sandsten, Svein Sand, Roy Yssen, Kjell Kleven, Rolf Rustad, Kjell Svestad, Arild Gulden, Ingar Engum, Gunnar Bergstrand.

Coach:

1964 World Men's Handball Championship (11th place)

Carl Graff-Wang, Knut Strøm, Finn Arne Johansen, Arnulf Bæk, Oddvar Klepperås, Trygve Hegnar, Jan Petter Aas, Per Graver, Jan-Egil Uthberg, Rolf Rustad, Kjell Svestad, Arild Gulden, Erik Schønfeldt.

Coach: John Tresse

1967 World Men's Handball Championship (13th place)

Carl Graff-Wang, Arnulf Bæk, Pål Cappelen, Pål Bye, Oddvar Klepperås, Inge K. Hansen, Jon Reinertsen, Per Graver, Jan-Egil Uthberg, Rolf Rustad, Kjell Svestad, Arild Gulden, Erik Schønfeldt, Jon Arne Gunnerud, Rolf Gustav Lundberg, Terje Høilund.

Coach: Kjell Kleven

1970 World Men's Handball Championship (13th place)

Carl Graff-Wang, Arnulf Bæk, Pål Cappelen, Pål Bye, Harald Tyrdal, Inge K. Hansen, Jon Reinertsen, Per Graver, Jan-Egil Uthberg, Kai Killerud, Jan Otto Kvalheim, Jan Cato Nabseth, Robert Wagtskjold.

Coach: Kjell Kleven

1972 Summer Olympics (9th place)

Carl Graff-Wang, Finn Urdal, Geir Røse, Harald Tyrdal, Arnulf Bæk, Inge K. Hansen, Jan Økseter, Jon Reinertsen, Pål Bye, Pål Cappelen, Per Søderstrøm, Per Ankre, Roger Hverven, Sten Osther, Torstein Hansen, Ulf Magnusson.

Coach: Thor Ole Rimejorde

1993 World Men's Handball Championship (13th place)

Svein Erik Bjerkrheim, Gunnar Fosseng, John Petter Sando, Roger Kjendalen, Sjur Bø Tollefsen, Ole Gustav Gjekstad, Rune Erland, Morten Schønfeldt, Øystein Havang, Kjetil Lundeberg, Fredrik Brubakken, Simen Muffetangen, Knut Håland, Morten Haugstvedt, Karl Erik Bøhn.

Coach: Gunnar Pettersen

1997 World Men's Handball Championship (12th place)

Frode Scheie, Jan Thomas Lauritzen, Stein Olaf Sando, Stig Rasch, Sjur Bø Tollefsen, Preben Vildalen, Kristian Hansen, Marius Riise, Øystein Havang, Frode Hagen, Johnny Jensen, Steinar Ege, Geir Oustorp, Glenn Solberg, Stian Vatne.

Coach: Harald Madsen

1999 World Men's Handball Championship (13th place)

Frode Scheie, Jan Thomas Lauritzen, Svein-Erik Bjerkrheim, Stig Rasch, Tormod Moldestad, Thomas Pettersen, Stig Penne, Morten Daland, Christian Berge (captain), Frode Hagen, Rune Haugseng, Endre Nordli, Geir Oustorp, Tor Bjørn Andersen, Trond Førde Eriksen.

Coach: Christer Magnusson

2000 European Men's Handball Championship (8th place)

Frode Scheie (captain), Jan Thomas Lauritzen, Stig Rasch, Tormod Moldestad, Stein Olaf Sando, Stig Penne, Vidar Gjesdal, Eivind Ellingsen, Christian Berge, Frode Hagen, Preben Vildalen, Gunnar Fosseng, Geir Oustorp, Thomas Pettersen, Sindre Walstad, Johnny Jensen.

Coach: Christer Magnusson

2001 World Men's Handball Championship (14th place)

Steinar Ege, Jan Thomas Lauritzen, Håvard Tvedten, Kristian Hansen, Tormod Moldestad, Roger Kvannli, Stig Penne, Eivind Ellingsen, Christian Berge, Frode Hagen, Preben Vildalen, Gunnar Fosseng (captain), Trond Førde Eriksen, Rune Skjærvold, Johnny Jensen, Børge Lund.

Coach: Christer Magnusson

2005 World Men's Handball Championship (7th place)

Steinar Ege, Glenn Solberg (captain), Håvard Tvedten, Frank Løke, Børge Lund, Frode Hagen, Preben Vildalen, Ole Erevik, Jarle Rykkje, Jan Thomas Lauritzen, Kristian Kjelling, Sindre Walstad, André Jørgensen, Johnny Jensen, Marius Riise, Rune Skjærvold.

Coach: Gunnar Pettersen

2006 European Men's Handball Championship (11th place)

Steinar Ege (captain), Alexander Buchmann, Christian Berge, Frank Løke, Kjetil Strand, Ole Magnus Ekelund, Bjarte Myrhol, Børge Lund, Håvard Tvedten, Preben Vildalen, Ole Erevik, Jarle Rykkje, Jan Thomas Lauritzen, Kristian Kjelling, André Jørgensen, Johnny Jensen, Rune Skjærvold.

Coach: Gunnar Pettersen

2007 World Men's Handball Championship (13th place)

Steinar Ege (captain), Alexander Buchmann, Erlend Mamelund, Frank Løke, Kjetil Strand, Jan-Richard Lislerud Hansen, Bjarte Myrhol, Børge Lund, Håvard Tvedten, Preben Vildalen, Ole Erevik, Jan Thomas Lauritzen, Kristian Kjelling, André Jørgensen, Johnny Jensen, Rune Skjærvold, Lars Erik Bjørnsen, Lars Olav Olaussen.

Coach: Gunnar Pettersen

2008 European Men's Handball Championship (6th place)

Steinar Ege (captain), Glenn Solberg, Frode Hagen, Frank Løke, Kjetil Strand, Lars Erik Bjørnsen, Bjarte Myrhol, Børge Lund, Håvard Tvedten, Ole Erevik, Jan Thomas Lauritzen, Kristian Kjelling, André Jørgensen, Johnny Jensen, Thomas Skoglund, Rune Skjærvold.

Coach: Gunnar Pettersen

2009 World Men's Handball Championship (9th place)

Steinar Ege (captain), Johnny Jensen, Stian Vatne, Thomas Drange, Frank Løke, Lars Erik Bjørnsen, Bjarte Myrhol, Håvard Tvedten, Erlend Mamelund, Ole Erevik, Christoffer Rambo, Alexander Buchmann, Kristian Kjelling, Svenn Erik Medhus, Vegard Samdahl, Thomas Skoglund, Christian Spanne.

Coach: Robert Hedin

2010 European Men's Handball Championship (7th place)

Steinar Ege (captain), Stian Vatne, Frank Løke, Kjetil Strand, Lars Erik Bjørnsen, Bjarte Myrhol, Børge Lund, Håvard Tvedten, Erlend Mamelund, Ole Erevik, Christoffer Rambo, Kristian Kjelling, Vegard Samdahl, Thomas Skoglund, Einar Sand Koren, Christian Spanne, Magnus Dahl.

Coach: Robert Hedin

2011 World Men's Handball Championship (9th place)

Steinar Ege (captain), Frank Løke, Kjetil Strand, Lars Erik Bjørnsen, Bjarte Myrhol, Børge Lund, Håvard Tvedten, Erlend Mamelund, Ole Erevik, Christoffer Rambo, Espen Lie Hansen, Kristian Kjelling, Vegard Samdahl, Thomas Skoglund, Einar Sand Koren, Eivind Tangen.

Coach: Robert Hedin

2012 European Men's Handball Championship (13th place)

Kenneth Ryvoll Klev, Vegard Samdahl, Lars Erik Bjørnsen, Bjarte Myrhol, Børge Lund (captain), Håvard Tvedten, Erlend Mamelund, Ole Erevik, Christoffer Rambo, Espen Lie Hansen, Svenn Erik Medhus, Magnus Jøndal, Johnny Jensen, Einar Riegelhuth Koren, Sondre Paulsen, Kent Robin Tønnesen.

Coach: Robert Hedin

2014 European Men's Handball Championship (14th place)

Magnus Dahl, Sander Sagosen, Bjarte Myrhol, Børge Lund (captain), Håvard Tvedten, Erlend Mamelund, Ole Erevik, Christoffer Rambo, Kent Robin Tønnesen, Christian O'Sullivan, Kristian Bjørnsen, André Lindboe, Magnus Gullerud, Kristian Kjelling, Harald Reinkind, Steffen Berg Løkkebø, Espen Lie Hansen.

Coach: Robert Hedin

2016 European Men's Handball Championship (4th place)

Sander Sagosen, Thomas Kristensen, Joakim Hykkerud, Bjarte Myrhol (captain), Petter Øverby, Erlend Mamelund, Ole Erevik, Kent Robin Tønnesen, Espen Christensen, Magnus Jøndal, Kristian Bjørnsen, André Lindboe, Magnus Gullerud, Christian O'Sullivan, Harald Reinkind, Espen Lie Hansen.

Coach: Christian Berge

2017 World Men's Handball Championship (2nd place)

Sander Sagosen, Joakim Hykkerud, Bjarte Myrhol (captain), Petter Øverby, Ole Erevik, Kent Robin Tønnesen, Espen Christensen, Magnus Jøndal, Kristian Bjørnsen, André Lindboe, Magnus Gullerud, Magnus Abelvik Rød, Christian O'Sullivan, Eivind Tangen, Gøran Johannessen, Torbjørn Bergerud, Espen Lie Hansen.

Coach: Christian Berge

2018 European Men's Handball Championship (7th place)

Sander Sagosen, Joakim Hykkerud, Bjarte Myrhol (captain), Henrik Jakobsen, Kent Robin Tønnesen, Espen Christensen, Magnus Jøndal, Kristian Bjørnsen, Magnus Gullerud, Gøran Sørheim, Gøran Johannessen, Christian O'Sullivan, Eivind Tangen, Harald Reinkind, Torbjørn Bergerud, Espen Lie Hansen, Magnus Abelvik Rød, Kristian Sæverås.

Coach: Christian Berge

2019 World Men's Handball Championship (2nd place)

Sander Sagosen, Bjarte Myrhol (captain), Henrik Jakobsen, Petter Øverby, Espen Christensen, Magnus Jøndal, Kristian Bjørnsen, Magnus Gullerud, Gøran Johannessen, Christian O'Sullivan, Eivind Tangen, Harald Reinkind, Torbjørn Bergerud, Kevin Gulliksen, Alexander Blonz, Magnus Abelvik Rød, Espen Lie Hansen.

Coach: Christian Berge

2020 European Men's Handball Championship (3rd place)

Tom Kåre Nikolaisen, Sander Sagosen, Sander Øverjordet, Petter Øverby, Kristian Sæverås, Espen Christensen, Magnus Jøndal, William Aar, Kristian Bjørnsen (captain), Magnus Gullerud, Gøran Johannessen, Christian O'Sullivan, Eivind Tangen, Harald Reinkind, Torbjørn Bergerud, Kevin Gulliksen, Alexander Blonz, Magnus Abelvik Rød.

Coach: Christian Berge

2021 World Men's Handball Championship (6th place)

Sander Sagosen, Sander Øverjordet, Bjarte Myrhol (captain), Henrik Jakobsen, Petter Øverby, Kristian Sæverås, Kent Robin Tønnesen, Espen Christensen, Magnus Jøndal, William Aar, Kristian Bjørnsen, Gøran Johannessen, Christian O'Sullivan, Eivind Tangen, Simen Holand Pettersen, Harald Reinkind, Torbjørn Bergerud, Thomas Solstad, Kevin Gulliksen, Alexander Blonz.

Coach: Christian Berge

2020 Summer Olympics (7th place)

Sander Sagosen, Bjarte Myrhol (captain), Magnus Fredriksen, Petter Øverby, Kristian Sæverås, Kent Robin Tønnesen, Magnus Jøndal, Kristian Bjørnsen, Magnus Gullerud, Christian O'Sullivan, Simen Holand Pettersen, Harald Reinkind, Torbjørn Bergerud, Kevin Gulliksen, Magnus Abelvik Rød.

Coach: Christian Berge

2022 European Men's Handball Championship (5th place)

Vetle Eck Aga, Sander Sagosen, Sebastian Barthold, Sander Øverjordet, Petter Øverby, Kristian Sæverås, Erik Thorsteinsen Toft, Kent Robin Tønnesen, Sander Heieren, Kristian Bjørnsen, Magnus Gullerud, Christian O'Sullivan (captain), Simen Holand Pettersen, Harald Reinkind, Endre Langaas, Torbjørn Bergerud, Thomas Solstad, Kevin Gulliksen, Alexander Blonz, Christoffer Rambo.

Coach: Christian Berge

2023 World Men's Handball Championship (6th place)

Vetle Eck Aga, Sander Sagosen, Sebastian Barthold, Sander Øverjordet, Petter Øverby, Kristian Sæverås, Erik Thorsteinsen Toft, Kristian Bjørnsen, Magnus Gullerud, Gøran Johannessen, Christian O'Sullivan (captain), Harald Reinkind, Tobias Grøndahl, Torbjørn Bergerud, Thomas Solstad, Kevin Gulliksen, Alexander Blonz, Magnus Abelvik Rød.

Coach: Jonas Wille

2024 European Men's Handball Championship (9th place)

Vetle Eck Aga, Sander Sagosen, Sebastian Barthold, Sander Øverjordet, Henrik Jakobsen, Petter Øverby, Kristian Sæverås, Erik Thorsteinsen Toft, Kent Robin Tønnesen, Kristian Bjørnsen, Magnus Gullerud, Tobias Grøndahl, Gøran Johannessen, Christian O'Sullivan (captain), Harald Reinkind, Torbjørn Bergerud, Gabriel Setterblom, Simen Lyse, Kevin Gulliksen, Alexander Blonz, Magnus Abelvik Rød.

Coach: Jonas Wille

2024 Summer Olympics (6th place)

Vetle Eck Aga, Sander Sagosen, Sebastian Barthold, Petter Øverby, Kristian Sæverås, Kristian Bjørnsen, Magnus Gullerud, Tobias Grøndahl, Christian O'Sullivan (captain), Harald Reinkind, Torbjørn Bergerud, Gabriel Setterblom, Simen Lyse, Alexander Blonz.

Coach: Jonas Wille

2025 World Men's Handball Championship (10th place)

Vetle Eck Aga, Sander Sagosen, Sebastian Barthold, Petter Øverby, Kristian Sæverås, Mario Matic, Kent Robin Tønnesen, William Aar, Kristian Bjørnsen, Magnus Gullerud, Tobias Grøndahl, Christian O'Sullivan (captain), Torbjørn Bergerud, Kasper Lien, Thomas Solstad, André Kristensen, August Pedersen, Simen Lyse, Magnus Abelvik Rød.

Coach: Jonas Wille

2026 European Men's Handball Championship (9th place)

Robin Paulsen Haug, Vetle Eck Aga (captain), Sander Sagosen, Vetle Rønningen, William Aar, Tobias Grøndahl, Martin Hovde, Magnus Fredriksen, Torbjørn Bergerud, Kasper Lien, Thomas Solstad, Patrick Helland Anderson, August Pedersen, Gabriel Setterblom, Simen Lyse, Kevin Gulliksen, Simen Schønningsen, Alexander Blonz.

Coach: Jonas Wille

=== Coaches ===
- John Tresse (1961–1965)
- Kjell Kleven (1965–1970)
- Thor Ole Rimejorde (1970–1973)
- Thor Nohr (1973–1977)
- Roar Østerbø (1977–1979)
- Per Otto Furuseth (1979–1985)
- Bertil Andersén (1985–1989)
- Gunnar Pettersen (1989–1994)
- Harald Madsen (1994–1997)
- Ivica Rimanić (1997)
- Christer Magnusson (1998–2001)
- Gunnar Pettersen (2001–2008)
- Robert Hedin (2008–2014)
- Christian Berge (2014–2022)
- Jonas Wille (2022–2026)
- Magnus Andersson (2026–)

=== Captains ===
- Christian Berge (World Championship, 1999)
- Frode Scheie (European Championship, 2000)
- Gunnar Fosseng (World Championship, 2001)
- Glenn Solberg (World Championship, 2005)
- Steinar Ege (European Championship, 2006, 2008, 2010; World Championship, 2007, 2009, 2011)
- Børge Lund (European Championship, 2012, 2014)
- Bjarte Myrhol (European Championship, 2016, 2018; World Championship, 2017, 2019, 2021; Olympic Games 2020)
- Kristian Bjørnsen (European Championship, 2020)
- Christian O'Sullivan (European Championship, 2022, 2024; World Championship, 2023, 2025, Olympic Games 2024)
- Vetle Eck Aga (European Championship, 2026)

Incomplete

=== Notable players ===
Several Norwegian players have seen their individual performance recognized at international tournaments, as a member of the All-Star Team or top scorer.

All-Star Team

- Frank Løke, 2008 European Championship
- Håvard Tvedten, 2011 World Championship
- Sander Sagosen, 2016, 2018 and 2020 European Championship, 2017 and 2019 World Championship
- Kristian Bjørnsen, 2017 World Championship
- Bjarte Myrhol, 2017 and 2019 World Championship
- Magnus Jøndal, 2019 World Championship, 2020 European Championship
- August Pedersen, 2026 European Championship

Top scorers

- Sander Sagosen, 2020 European Championship (65 goals)

=== Individual all-time records ===
Still active national team players are highlighted

==== Most matches played ====
Total number of matches played in official competitions only.

#	Player	Matches	Goals
1	Bjarte Myrhol	263	803
2	Steinar Ege	262	1
3	Jan Thomas Lauritzen	254	557
4	Roger Kjendalen	246	939
5	Børge Lund	216	390
6	Kristian Bjørnsen	215	756
7	Håvard Tvedten	208	809
7	Magnus Gullerud	208	308
7	Christian O'Sullivan	208	300
10	Preben Vildalen	201	312

Last updated: 8 November 2026
Source: handball.no

==== Most goals scored ====
Total number of goals scored in official matches only.

#	Player	Goals	Matches	Average
1	Sander Sagosen	956	197	4.85
2	Roger Kjendalen	939	246	3.82
3	Håvard Tvedten	809	208	3.88
4	Bjarte Myrhol	803	263	3.05
5	Kristian Bjørnsen	756	215	3.51
6	Øystein Havang	718	188	3.82
7	Frank Løke	646	186	3.47
8	Kristian Kjelling	615	159	3.86
9	Magnus Jøndal	577	177	3.26
10	Frode Hagen	574	188	3.05

Last updated: 16 May 2026
Source: handball.no

==== Most championships played ====
Total number of championships played.

#	Player	Championships	Career
1	Sander Sagosen	14	2013–
1	Bjarte Myrhol	14	2002–2021
2	Christian O'Sullivan	13	2012–
2	Kristian Bjørnsen	13	2012–2025
3	Magnus Gullerud	12	2010–2025
3	Torbjørn Bergerud	12	2013–
4	Harald Reinkind	11	2011–
4	Petter Øverby	11	2013–2025
4	Ole Erevik	11	2001–2017
5	Kent Robin Tønnesen	10	2010–2025
5	Håvard Tvedten	10	2000–2014

Last updated: 2026 European Championship

==== Most medals ====
OG: Olympic Games, WC: World Championship, EC: European Championship

#	Player	OG	WC	EC	Total
1	Torbjørn Bergerud		2 (silver)	1 (bronze)	3
1	Magnus Gullerud		2 (silver)	1 (bronze)	3
1	Harald Reinkind		2 (silver)	1 (bronze)	3
1	Magnus Abelvik Rød		2 (silver)	1 (bronze)	3
1	Sander Sagosen		2 (silver)	1 (bronze)	3
1	Gøran Johannessen		2 (silver)	1 (bronze)	3
1	Petter Øverby		2 (silver)	1 (bronze)	3
1	Kristian Bjørnsen		2 (silver)	1 (bronze)	3
1	Espen Christensen		2 (silver)	1 (bronze)	3
1	Magnus Jøndal		2 (silver)	1 (bronze)	3
1	Christian O'Sullivan		2 (silver)	1 (bronze)	3
1	Eivind Tangen		2 (silver)	1 (bronze)	3

Last updated: 2020 European Championship

==== Most goals scored in a single match ====
Players with the most goals in official matches only.

#	Player	Goals	Against	Date	Tournament
1	August Pedersen	19	Netherlands	21 March 2026	Golden League
1	Kjetil Strand	19	Iceland	2 February 2006	2006 European Men's Handball Championship
2	Sjur Tollefsen	14	Belgium	27 November 1996	Friendly match
2	Michael Hald	14	Israel	7 November 1986	Friendly tournament
3	Alexander Blonz	13	United States	22 March 2026	Golden League
3	Sander Sagosen	13	France	3 May 2017	Friendly match
3	Håvard Tvedten	13	Czech Republic	8 January 2010	Cimber Sterling Cup
3	Erlend Mamelund	13	Iceland	14 June 2009	Friendly match
3	Ole Gustav Gjekstad	13	Belgium	19 March 1992	Men's Handball World Championship Level B
3	Ketil Marton Sævereide	13	Netherlands	6 November 1986	Friendly tournament
4	Tobias Grøndahl	12	Spain	11 January 2025	Friendly match
4	Espen Lie Hansen	12	Croatia	6 January 2013	Friendly match
4	Alexander Buchmann	12	Sweden	6 September 2005	Friendly match
4	Kristian Kjelling	12	Germany; Croatia	27 January 2005; 28 July 2004	2005 World Men's Handball Championship; Friendly match
4	Roger Kjendalen	12	Lithuania; Netherlands	8 January 1994; 3 December 1989	Lotto Cup; Friendly tournament
4	Ole Gundem	12	Israel	2 March 1979	Men's Handball World Championship Level B
4	Per Graver	12	Finland	27 January 1969	Friendly match

Last updated: 22 March 2026
Source: handball.no
