= Haugstvedt =

Haugstvedt is a Norwegian surname. Notable people with the surname include:

- Asbjørn Haugstvedt (1926–2008), Norwegian politician
- Morten Haugstvedt (fl. 1992–1994), Norwegian handball player
