= Kvalheim (surname) =

Kvalheim is a surname. Notable people with the surname include:

- Arne Kvalheim (born 1945), Norwegian long-distance runner
- Bård Kvalheim (born 1973), Norwegian middle-distance runner
- Geir Ove Kvalheim (born 1970), Norwegian producer, film director, actor, and writer
- Jan Kvalheim (born 1963), Norwegian beach volleyball player
- Jan Otto Kvalheim, Norwegian handball player
- Knut Kvalheim (born 1950), Norwegian long-distance runner
- Tore Eugen Kvalheim (born 1959), Norwegian trade unionist
