= Roger Kjendalen =

Norwegian handball player (born 1965)

Personal information
- Nationality: Norwegian
- Born: 6 June 1965 (age 61)
- Height: 192 cm (76 in)

Sport
- Sport: Handball
- Position: Left back, Centre back

Senior clubs
- Years: Team
- 1985–1988: IF Urædd
- 1988–1991: TuS Schutterwald
- 1991–1994: IL Runar
- 1994–1996: VfL Fredenbeck
- 1996–2000: SG Flensburg-Handewitt
- 2000–2001: GC Amicitia Zürich
- 2001–2002: Drammen HK
- 2002–2008: Runar Sandefjord
National team
Years	Team	Apps	(Gls)
1985–1998	Norway	242	(930)

Teams managed
- 2011–2012: Runar Sandefjord

Roger Kjendalen (born 6 June 1965) is a Norwegian handball player and coach. He played 242 matches and scored 930 goals for the Norway men's national handball team between 1985 and 1998. He participated at the 1993 World Men's Handball Championship.

Kjendalen was awarded the Håndballstatuetten trophy from the Norwegian Handball Federation in 2011.

== Career ==
Kjendalen started his career at IF Urædd, where he won the Norwegian Championship and Cup in both 1986 and 1987. He then joined German team TuS Schutterwald.

From 1991 to 1994 he returned to Norway, where he played for Runar Sandefjord. Here he won the Norwegian Championship in 1993 and 1994. In 1994 he was also the league top scorer.

He then joined VfL Fredenbeck in the German 2nd Bundesliga. In 1996 he joined SG Flensburg-Handewitt, where he won the EHF Cup with the club in 1997.

In 2000 he joined GC Amicitia Zürich in Switzerland for a single season, before returning to Norway, where he played for Drammen HK and Runar Sandefjord. Back with Sandefjord he won the Norwegian Double three further times, in 2003, 2004 and 2006 and the Norwegian cup in 2007.

In 2011 he was the head coach of Sandefjord, when he was covering for Eivind Ellingsen, who was out with illness.

== Titles ==
- Norwegian Championship:
  - Winner: 1986, 1987, 1993, 1994, 2003, 2004, 2006
- Norwegian Cup:
  - Winner: 1986, 1987, 1993, 2003, 2004, 2006, 2007
- EHF Cup:
  - Winner: 1997
- Euro-City Cup:
  - Winner: 1999
