= Daland =

Daland may refer to:

== People ==
- Jesper Daland (born 2000), Norwegian football player
- Morten Daland, Norwegian handball player
- Peter Daland (1921–2014), American swimming coach

== Fictional character ==
- Daland, a fictional character in the 1843 opera Der fliegende Holländer by Richard Wagner

== Places ==
- Daland, Iran
- Daland Rural District

== Other ==
- Huff-Daland, American aircraft manufacturer
