= Rolf Gustav Lundberg =

Norwegian handball player

Personal information
- Nationality: Norwegian
- Born: August 5, 1944 (age 82) Hernes, Norway

Sport
- Sport: Handball

Senior clubs
- Years: Team
- –: Elverum Håndball
- –: Fredensborg
National team
Years	Team	Apps	(Gls)
1966–1976	Norway	29	(71)

Rolf Gustav Lundberg (born 5 August 1944) is a Norwegian handball player.

He made his debut on the Norwegian national team in 1966 in a 16-15 win against Denmark, and played 29 matches for the national team between 1966 and 1976. He participated at the 1967 World Men's Handball Championship.

At club level he played for Elverum Håndball and Fredensborg. In the 1966-67 season and in the 1967-68 season he was the club top scorer. He was also the first player to reach 1000 goals for Elverum.
