= Jan-Egil Uthberg =

Norwegian handball player

Personal information
- Nationality: Norwegian
- Born: September 14, 1944 Rjukan, Norway
- Died: November 2, 2008 (aged 64)

Sport
- Sport: Handball

Youth career
- Years: Team
- –: Rjukan IL

Senior clubs
- Years: Team
- –: Rjukan IL
- –: Bergensstudentenes Idrettslag
- –: Bækkelagets SK
- –: Kragerø Håndball
National team
| Years | Team | Apps | (Gls) |
| 1963–1971 | Norway | 50 | (46) |

Teams managed
- 2003–2004: Follo HK (Director)

Jan-Egil Uthberg (14 September 1944 - 2 November 2008) was a Norwegian handball player.

== Handball player ==
He made his debut on the Norwegian national team in 1963, and played 50 matches for the national team between 1963 and 1971. He participated at the 1964, 1967, and 1970 World Men's Handball Championship.

Uthberg started playing handball at Rjukan IL in his hometown. In 1969 he won the Norwegian Championship with Bergensstudentenes Idrettslag. In 1971 he won the Norwegian Men's Handball Cup as the player-coach of Bækkelagets SK. Later he became the player-coach of Kragerø Håndball, where he guided them promotion to the top division in the 1974-75 season.

== After retiring ==
After his playing days he has worked at the Norwegian Handball Federation. In 2003 he was chosen as the managing director at the club Follo HK. A year after he retired from this position.
