= Carl Graff-Wang =

Norwegian handball player (1943–2007)

Carl Georg Graff-Wang (18 April 1943 – 18 December 2007) was a Norwegian handball player and businessperson.

He was born in Oslo as a son of Solveig and Georg Fritz Kornelius Graff-Wang. His father was a lawyer, but after finishing his secondary education, Carl Graff-Wang graduated from the Norwegian School of Economics in 1967.

Playing club handball for SK Arild, he was capped 83 times for the Norway men's national handball team. In 1972 he was part of the Norwegian team which finished ninth in the Olympic tournament. At the 1972 Olympics, he played four matches and scored five goals.

Graff-Wang was hired as chief financial officer in Ford Motor Norge in 1969, but quickly moved to Norsk Scania Vabis in 1970, where he then served as the chief executive officer from 1976 to 1991. From 1987 to 1992 he was also the chief executive officer of NSV Invest. After that he professionalized in sitting on boards of directors. He was a board member of Jonas Øglænd AS and Varner Øglænd, Dressmann, Cubus, NSV Invest, Ambra, Moelven Industrier and Ekornes and OBOS as well as various companies in insurance and shipping. He chaired the board of Staff Gruppen and was a supervisory council member in Storebrand.

In his original field of work, the automotive industry, he was also a board member of the Norwegian Automobile Importers' Association in 1978–80, 1983–86 (deputy chairman) and 1989–91. He remained active as a hobby sports practitioner, with cross-country skiing, marathon running, cycling and tennis. He died in December 2007, aged 64.
