= Geir Oustorp =

Norwegian handball player and coach

Personal information
- Nationality: Norwegian
- Born: June 3, 1972 (age 54) Sandefjord, Norway
- Height: 183 cm (72 in)

Sport
- Sport: Handball
- Position: Left wing
- Current club: Larvik HK; Norway U19

Senior clubs
- Years: Team
- 1989-1995: Sandefjord Håndball
- 1995-1997: Drammen Håndballklubb
- 1997-1998: TuS Nettelstedt-Lübbecke
- 1998-1999: Sandefjord Håndball
- 1999-2007: Drammen Håndballklubb
National team
Years	Team	Apps	(Gls)
1992–2004	Norway	91	(317)

Teams managed
- 2007–2010: Byåsen HE
- 2010–2011: Glassverket IF
- 2011–2013: Drammen HK
- 2016–2017: Glassverket IF
- 2017: Larvik HK (assistant)
- 12/2017–2/2019: Larvik HK
- 2017–2018: Norway U19
- 3/2019–2021: Reistad IL
- 2022-2024: Czech Republic Women (assistant)
- 2022–2023: Glassverket IF

Geir Oustorp is a former Norwegian handball player and current coach.

He made his debut on the Norwegian national team in 1992, and played 91 matches for the national team between 1992 and 2004. He participated at the 1999 World Men's Handball Championship, where Norway finished 13th.

== Playing career ==
He played 17 seasons at top level, 4 for Sandefjord Håndball, 12 for Drammen Håndballklubb and a single season for German club TuS Nettelstedt-Lübbecke. As a player he won 5 Norwegian championships and 2 EHF Cups.

He broke his leg in a match on 6 December 2006 against Sandefjord Håndball, which forced him to retire a year earlier than he'd planned.

== Coaching career ==
On 12 March 2007 he became the head coach of Byåsen HE on a three year deal. In 2010 he became the head coach of Glassverket IF, where he stayed for a single season.

From 2011 to 2013 he was the head coach of his former club Drammen HK. He was fired after the 2012-13 season, a year before the contract's initial expiry date, for poor results, when the team finished 7th despite hopes of silverware.

In 2016 he returned to Glassverket IF to coach the women's team. A year later he left because of the club's poor economic situation.

In December 2017 he became the head coach of Larvik HK, replacing Tor Odvar Moen. In February 2019 he announced his intention to leave the team after the 2018-19 season. This prompted the club to fire him with immediate effect, as they did not wish to have a head coach, that was not a permanent solution. In March the same season he became the head coach at the Reistad IL women's team.

In 2022 he became the assistant coach of Czech women's national team under fellow Norwegian Bent Dahl. In this position, he was part of the team that reached a quarterfinal of a World Championship for the first in Czech history at the 2023 World Championship.

In 2022 he returned as the head coach of Glassverket IF's women's team, which played in the 1st Division at the time. However already in March 2023 he left team. He was in this position until 2021, when he was replaced by Goran Rajkovic.

He ceased to be the assistant coach of the Czech women's national team after the 2024 European Championship, when both he and Bent Dahl left. They were replaced by Tomáš Hlavatý and Daniel Čurda.

== Post-playing career ==
In addition to coaching, Oustorp have also acted as a Handball expert on Norwegian television. He also works as a police officer.
