= Eivind Tangen =

Norwegian handball player (born 1993)

Personal information
- Nationality: Norwegian
- Born: 4 May 1993 (age 33) Bergen, Norway
- Height: 1.95 m (6 ft 5 in)

Sport
- Sport: Handball
- Position: Right back
- Current club: Retired

Senior clubs
- Years: Team
- –2016: FyllingenBergen
- 2016–2018: HC Midtjylland
- 2018–2025: Skjern Håndbold
National team
Years	Team	Apps	(Gls)
2010–2022	Norway	102	(163)
Medal record
World Championship
Silver medal – second place	2017 France
Silver medal – second place	2019 Germany/Denmark
European Championship
Bronze medal – third place	2020 Sweden/Austria/Norway

Eivind Tangen (born 4 May 1993) is a retired Norwegian handball player, who last played for Skjern Håndbold and formerly the Norwegian national team.

He participated at the 2011 World Men's Handball Championship.

In April 2025 he announced his retirement after the 2024/25 season.

== Personal life ==
He is in relationship with fellow handballer, Stine Skogrand. They have two children together.
