= Roy Yssen =

Norwegian handball player

Personal information
- Nationality: Norwegian

Sport
- Sport: Handball
National team
Years	Team	Apps	(Gls)
1957–1961	Norway	15	(38)

Roy Yssen is a Norwegian handball player.

He made his debut on the Norwegian national team in 1957, and played 15 matches for the national team between 1957 and 1961. He participated at the 1958 and 1961 World Men's Handball Championship.

He is an honorary member of Haugerud IF.
