= William Aar =

Norwegian handball player (born 1997)

Personal information
- Full name: William Otto Aar
- Nationality: Norwegian
- Born: 23 October 1997 (age 28) Trondheim, Norway
- Height: 1.98 m (6 ft 6 in)

Sport
- Sport: Handball
- Position: Left back
- Current club: TTH Holstebro
- Number: 7

Senior clubs
- Years: Team
- –2018: Sandnes HK
- 2018–2020: Kolstad Håndball
- 2020–2021: Aarhus Håndbold
- 2021–2024: Ribe-Esbjerg HH
- 2024–: TTH Holstebro
National team
Years	Team	Apps	(Gls)
2019–	Norway	34	(47)
Medal record
European Championship
Bronze medal – third place	2020 Sweden/Austria/Norway

William Aar (born 23 October 1997) is a Norwegian handball player for TTH Holstebro and the Norwegian national team.

He represented Norway at the 2020 European Men's Handball Championship.
