= Terje Høilund =

Norwegian handball player

Personal information
- Nationality: Norwegian

Sport
- Sport: Handball
National team
Years	Team	Apps	(Gls)
1965–1967	Norway	11	(5)

Terje Høilund is a Norwegian handball player.

He made his debut on the Norwegian national team in 1965, and played 11 matches for the national team between 1965 and 1967. He participated at the 1967 World Men's Handball Championship.
