= Svein-Erik Bjerkrheim =

Norwegian handball player (born 1971)

Personal information
- Nationality: Norwegian
- Born: 9 April 1971 (age 55)

Sport
- Sport: Handball

Senior clubs
- Years: Team
- -1995: Fredensborg/Ski
- 1995-2007: Drammen HK
National team
Years	Team	Apps	(Gls)
1991-2003	Norway	85	(155)

Svein-Erik Bjerkrheim (born 9 April 1971) is a Norwegian schoolteacher and handball player.

Bjerkrheim made his debut on the Norwegian national team in 1991 against Lithuania, and played 85 matches for the national team between 1991 and 2003. He competed at the 1999 World Men's Handball Championship, where Norway finished 13th.

He played for Drammen HK for most of his career, where was the Club Captain. Afterwards he has had various administrative positions at the club. He has also worked with youth coaching. Before 1995 he played for Fredensborg/Ski.

== Private ==
He is married to handball player Susann Goksør Bjerkrheim. Their son Jonatan Gaksør Bjerkrheim is also a handball player for Drammen HK.
