= Knut Strøm (handballer) =

Norwegian handball player

Personal information
- Nationality: Norwegian

Sport
- Sport: Handball
National team
Years	Team	Apps	(Gls)
1959–1964	Norway	28	(20)

Knut Strøm is a Norwegian handball player.

He made his debut on the Norwegian national team in 1959, and played 28 matches for the national team between 1959 and 1964. He participated at the 1961 and 1964 World Men's Handball Championship.
