= Trond Førde Eriksen =

Norwegian handball player

Personal information
- Nationality: Norwegian

Sport
- Sport: Handball
National team
Years	Team	Apps	(Gls)
1997-2001	Norway	27	(35)

Trond Førde Eriksen is a Norwegian handball player.

He made his debut on the Norwegian national team in 1997, and played 27 matches for the national team between 1997 and 2001. He competed at the 1999 and the 2001 World Men's Handball Championship.
