= Kasper Lien =

Norwegian handball player (born 2001)

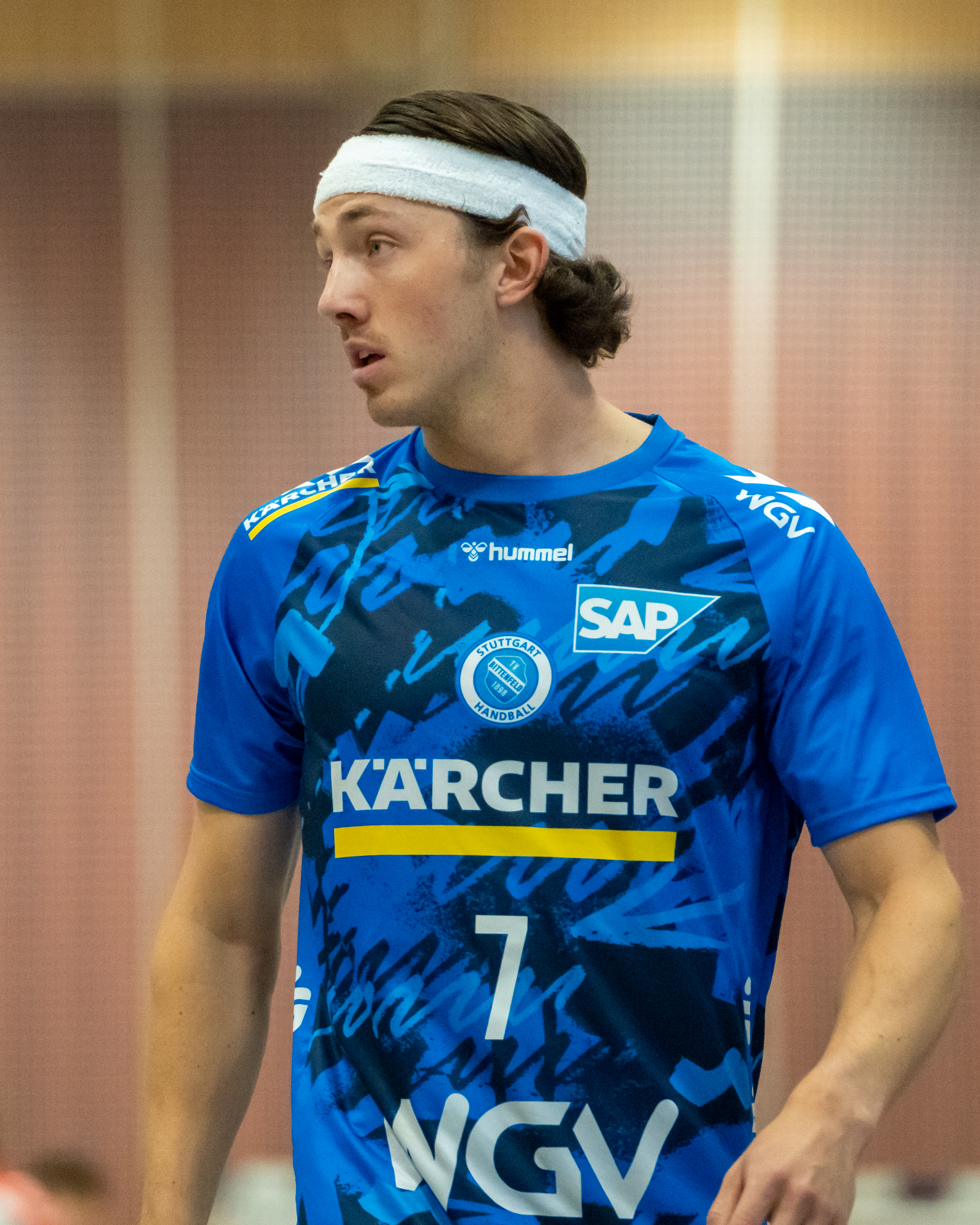
- Lien in 2025

Personal information
- Full name: Kasper Thorsen Lien
- Nationality: Norwegian
- Born: 15 April 2001 (age 25) Sarpsborg, Norway
- Height: 1.94 m (6 ft 4 in)

Sport
- Sport: Handball
- Position: Right wing
- Current club: TVB Stuttgart
- Number: 7

Youth career
- Years: Team
- –: Tindlund IF
- –2018: Sarpsborg IL

Senior clubs
- Years: Team
- 2018–2019: Sarpsborg IL
- 2019–2021: Halden Topphåndball
- 2021–2025: Elverum Håndball
- 2025–2027: TVB Stuttgart
- 2027–: HØJ Elite
National team
Years	Team	Apps	(Gls)
2021–	Norway	46	(85)

Kasper Thorsen Lien (born 15 April 2001) is a Norwegian handball player for TVB Stuttgart and the Norwegian national team.

He participated at the 2025 World Men's Handball Championship.

== Achievements ==
- Norwegian League:
  - Gold: 2021/22, 2024/25
  - Silver: 2022/23, 2023/24
- Norwegian Cup:
  - Finalist: 2022/23, 2023/24, 2024
