= Gunnar Bergstrand =

Norwegian handball player

Personal information
- Nationality: Norwegian

Sport
- Sport: Handball
National team
Years	Team	Apps	(Gls)
1958–1961	Norway	5	(0)

Gunnar Bergstrand is a Norwegian handball player.

He made his debut on the Norwegian national team in 1958, and played 5 matches for the national team between 1958 and 1961. He participated at the 1961 World Men's Handball Championship.
