= Kai Killerud =

Norwegian handball player

Personal information
- Nationality: Norwegian
- Born: September 29, 1940
- Died: May 30, 2021 (aged 80)

Sport
- Sport: Handball
- Position: Goalkeeper

Senior clubs
- Years: Team
- –: Nordstrand IF
National team
Years	Team	Apps	(Gls)
1961–1971	Norway	33	(0)

Kai Killerud (29 September 1940 - 30 May 2021) was a Norwegian handball player.

He made his debut on the Norwegian national team in 1961, and played 33 matches for the national team between 1961 and 1971. He participated at the 1961 and 1970 World Men's Handball Championship.

At club level he played for Nordstrand IF, where he won the Norwegian Men's Handball Cup in 1960.

He died on 30 May 2021 at the age of 80.

He was educated as a civil engineer, and worked with energy supply.
