= Thomas Skoglund =

Norwegian handball player (born 1983)

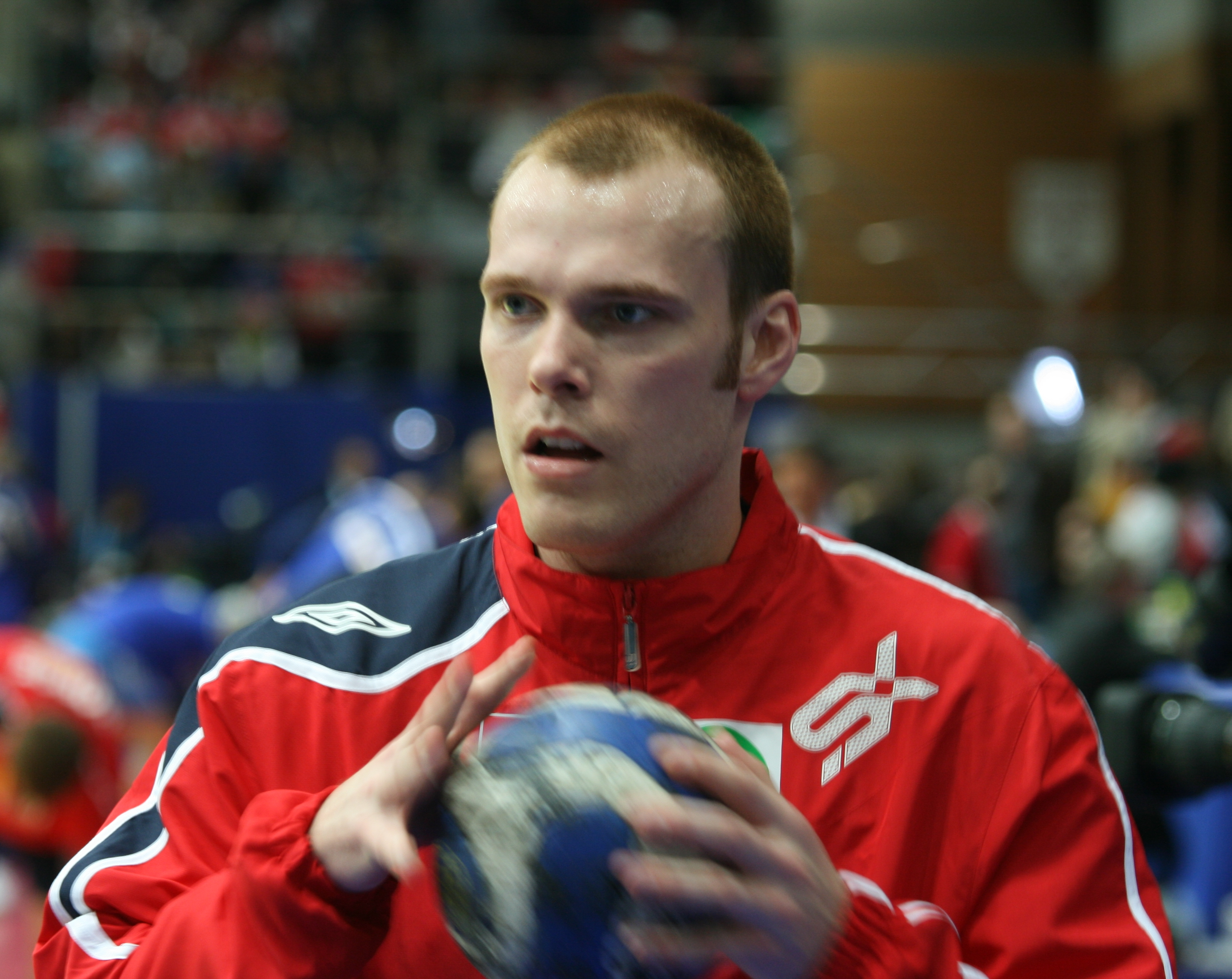
- Thomas Skoglund at the 2008 European Men's Handball Championship

Personal information
- Nationality: Norwegian
- Born: 3 March 1983 (age 43) Lillestrøm, Norway
- Height: 1.83 m (6 ft 0 in)

Sport
- Sport: Handball
- Position: Left wing
- Current club: Retired

Senior clubs
- Years: Team
- -2006: Fet
- 2006-2009: Haslum
- 2009-2010: GOG Svendborg
- 2010-2012: Team Tvis Holstebro
- 2012-2015: Lillestrøm Topphåndbold
National team
Years	Team	Apps	(Gls)
2004–2015	Norway	100	(178)

Thomas Skoglund (born 3 March 1983) is a former Norwegian handball player, who played for the Danish clubs GOG Svendborg and Team Tvis Holstebro and Norwegian clubs Fet, Haslum and Lillestrøm Topphåndbold.

He started his club career in Fet. In 2006 he moved to Haslum. Three years later he moved to GOG, where he played until the club went bankrupt after the 2009/2010 season. He then moved to Team Tvis Holstebro. He returned to Norway in 2012, where he played for Lillestrøm for the rest of his career.

He made his debut on the Norwegian national team in 2004 against Feroe Islands.
