= Kjell Svestad =

Norwegian handball player (1932–2008)

Personal information
- Nationality: Norwegian
- Born: 26 November 1932
- Died: 2008 (aged 75–76)

Sport
- Sport: Handball
National team
Years	Team	Apps	(Gls)
1957–1967	Norway	59	(37)

Kjell Svestad (26 November 1932 – 2008) a Norwegian handball player. He made his debut on the Norwegian national team in 1957, and played 59 matches for the national team between 1957 and 1967. He participated at the 1958, 1961, 1964, and 1967 World Men's Handball Championship.

Svestad was awarded the Håndballstatuetten trophy from the Norwegian Handball Federation in 2001. He died in 2008.
