= Pål Cappelen =

Norwegian handball player (born 1947)

Pål Cappelen (born 17 February 1947) is a retired Norwegian handball player who competed in the 1972 Summer Olympics.

He was born in Oslo and represented the club SK Arild. In 1972, he was part of the Norwegian team which finished ninth in the Olympic tournament. He played three matches.
