= Kristian Hansen (handballer) =

Norwegian handball player

Personal information
- Nationality: Norwegian
- Born: 1973 (age 52–53) Sandefjord, Nnorway

Sport
- Sport: Handball
- Position: Centre back

Senior clubs
- Years: Team
- 1991-2004: Runar Sandefjord
- 2004-2008: Nøtterøy Håndball
National team
Years	Team	Apps	(Gls)
1995-2001	Norway	57	(62)

Kristian Hansen is a Norwegian handball player.

He made his debut on the Norwegian national team in 1995, and played 57 matches for the national team between 1995 and 2001. He competed at the 1997 World Men's Handball Championship, and again at the 2001 World Men's Handball Championship.

He played for Runar Sandefjord for 13 seasons, and was the captain of the team. He has held several club records, including most matches, most goals and most assists. In 2025 Tobias Rivesjø overtook his record for most goals at the club. During his time at the club he won 3 cups and 4 league titles. Afterwards he played for Nøtterøy Håndball for four seasons.
