= Christer Magnusson =

Swedish handball player (born 1958)

Personal information
- Full name: Bo Christer Magnusson
- Nationality: Swedish
- Born: 1 April 1958 (age 68) Göteborg, Sweden
- Height: 192 cm (76 in)

Sport
- Sport: Handball
- Position: Center back

Senior clubs
- Years: Team
- –: HP Warta
National team
Years	Team	Apps
1979–1985	Sweden	102

Teams managed
- –: Västra Frölunda IF
- 1997–1998: HP Warta
- 1998–2001: Norway men
- 2001–2004: HP Warta
- 2005–2006: IK Heim
- –: Särökometernas HK

Bo Christer Magnusson (born 1 April 1958 in Gothenburg, Sweden) is a former Swedish handball player and coach who competed in the 1984 Summer Olympics. From 1998 to 2001 he was the head coach for the Norway men's national team.

In 1984 he finished fifth with the Swedish team in the Olympic tournament. He played all six matches and scored four goals.

At club level he played for HP Warta, where he also became a coach. As the head coach of Norway, he got a 13th place at the 1999 World Championship and a 14th place at the 2001 World Championship. He also got an 8th place at the 2000 European Championship.
