= Vegard Samdahl =

Norwegian handball player (born 1978)

Personal information
- Full name: Vegard Samdahl
- Nationality: Norwegian (Norway)
- Born: March 21, 1978 (age 48) Trondheim, Norway
- Height: 188 cm (74 in)

Sport
- Sport: Handball
- Position: Playmaker
- Current club: Retired

Youth career
- Years: Team
- –: SK Rapp
- –: Sjetne IL

Senior clubs
- Years: Team
- –: Heimdal HK
- -2001: Viking HK
- 2001-2006: IFK Skövde
- 2006-2009: Aarhus GF
- 2009-2011: Wisła Płock
- 2011-2013: Viking HK
- 2013-2015: Sandnes HK
National team
| Years | Team | Apps | (Gls) |
| 2000-2012 | Norway | 86 | (111) |

Vegard Samdahl (born March 21, 1978) is a Norwegian former handballer. He played for Sweden's Stavanger IF, Elitserien level club IFK Skövde and Danish league club Aarhus GF, and polish Wisła Płock, as well as Viking HK, Heimdal HK and Sandnes HK in Norway.

In 2011 he won the Polish Championship with Wisła Płock, and in 2004 he won the EHF Challenge Cup with IFK Skövde. In the 2006-07 season he was named playmaker of the year in the Danish League.

Samdahl made his debut for the Norwegian national team on May 6th, 2000 against Greenland, and he went on to play 86 matches for the team. He played just 7 matches until 2008 where he became a consistent part of the national team.
