= Sander Øverjordet =

Norwegian handballer and badminton player (born 1996)

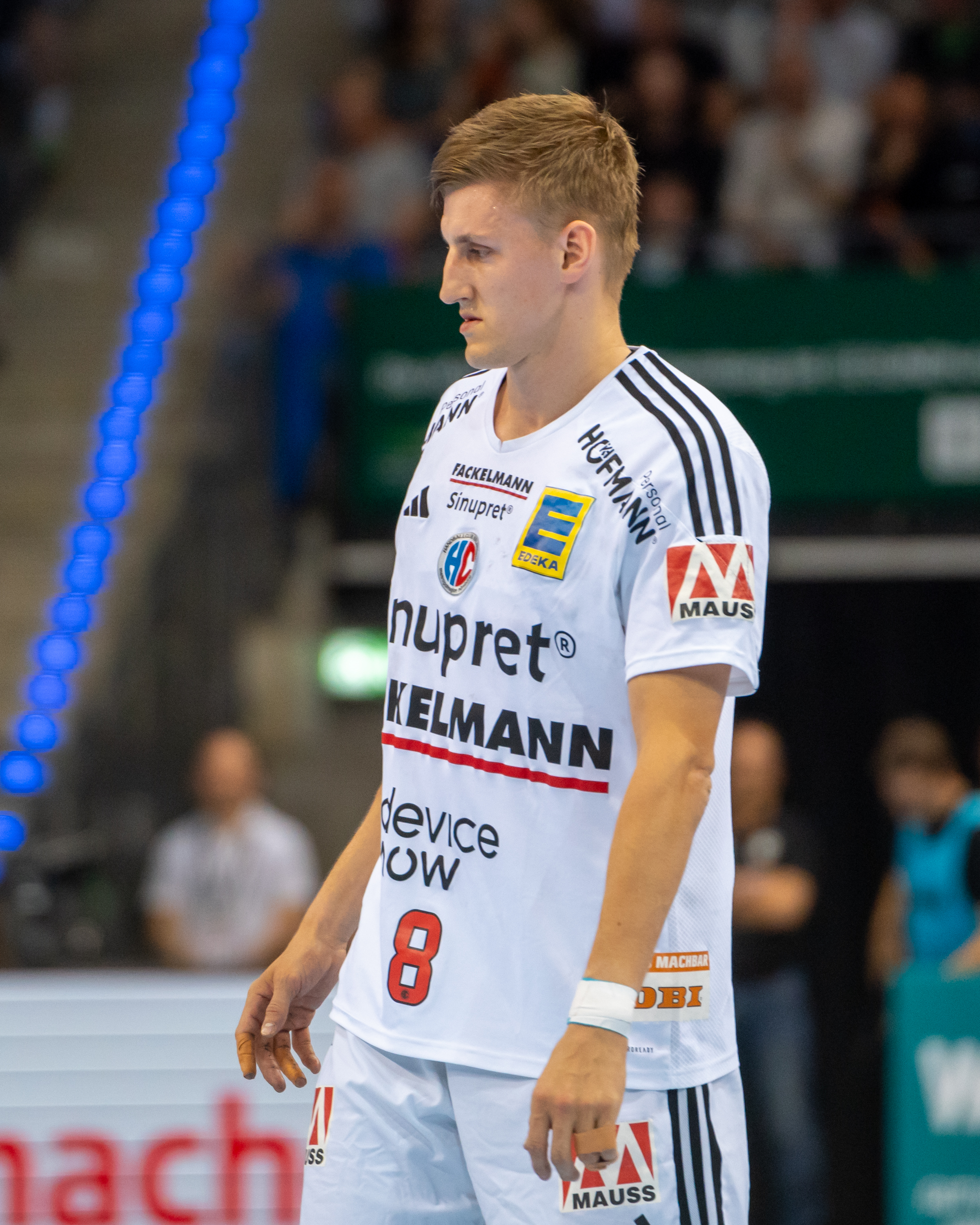
- Øverjordet in 2025

Personal information
- Full name: Sander Andreassen Øverjordet
- Nationality: Norwegian
- Born: 8 April 1996 (age 30) Oslo, Norway
- Height: 1.97 m (6 ft 6 in)

Sport
- Sport: Handball
- Position: Centre back
- Current club: HC Erlangen
- Number: 8

Senior clubs
- Years: Team
- 2012–2013: Oppsal
- 2013: Vålerengens IF
- 2013–2020: Haslum HK
- 2020–2022: Mors-Thy Håndbold
- 2022–2024: KIF Kolding
- 2024–: HC Erlangen
National team
Years	Team	Apps	(Gls)
2019–	Norway	57	(56)
Medal record
European Championship
Bronze medal – third place	2020 Sweden/Austria/Norway
- Updated on 15 August 2025

Sander Øverjordet (born 8 April 1996) is a Norwegian handball player for HC Erlangen and the Norwegian national team.

He is also a former Norwegian champion in badminton back in 2013.

== Honours ==
- European Championship:
  - Bronze: 2020
