= Thomas Solstad =

Norwegian handball player (born 1997)

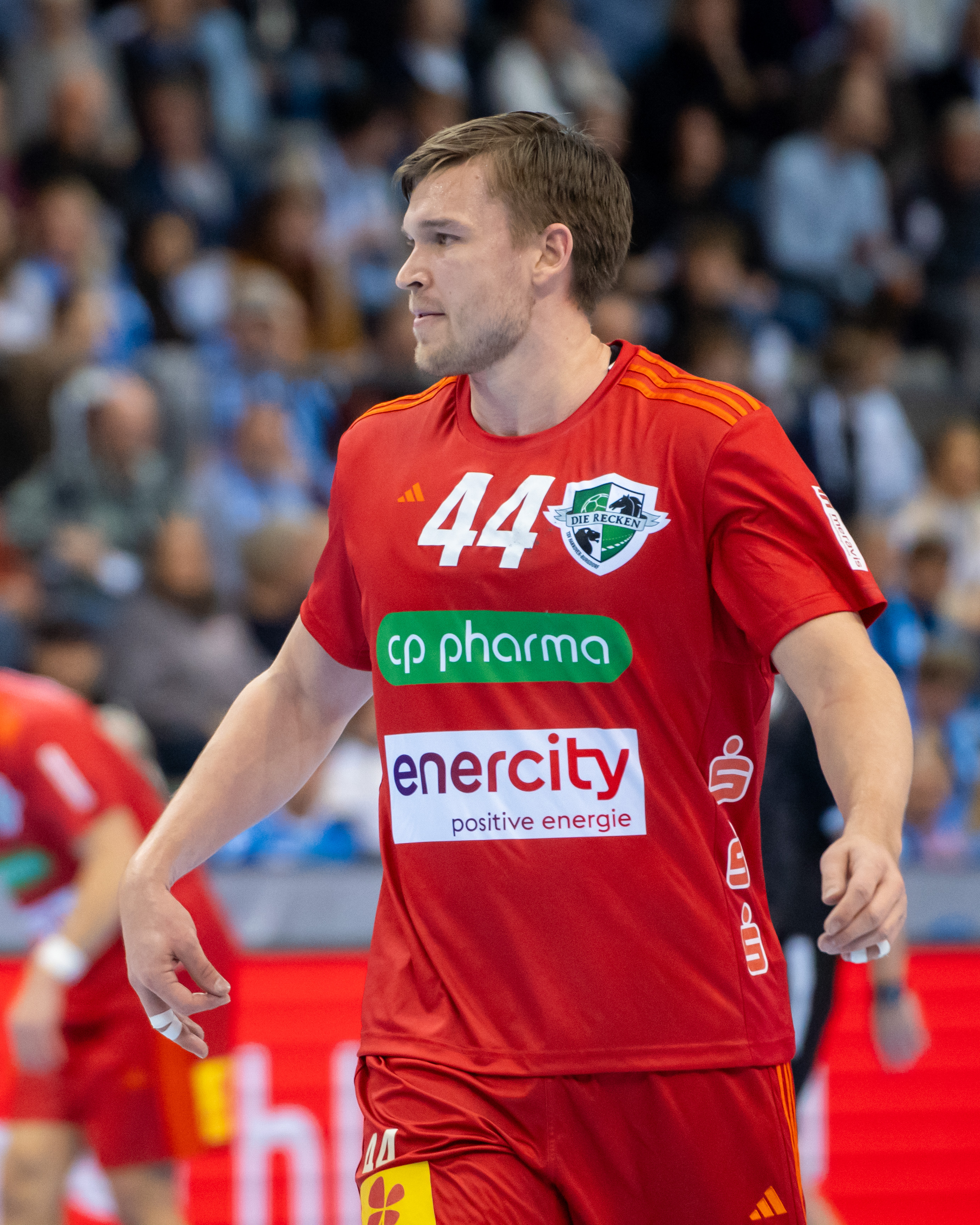
- Solstad in 2025

Personal information
- Full name: Thomas Alfred Solstad
- Nationality: Norwegian
- Born: 26 February 1997 (age 29) Ski, Norway
- Height: 1.94 m (6 ft 4 in)

Sport
- Sport: Handball
- Position: Pivot
- Current club: TSV Hannover-Burgdorf
- Number: 44

Youth career
- Years: Team
- –2013: Follo HK

Senior clubs
- Years: Team
- 2013–2016: Follo HK
- 2016–2019: Halden Topphåndball
- 2019–2022: Elverum Håndball
- 2022–2024: Bjerringbro-Silkeborg Håndbold
- 2024–2026: TSV Hannover-Burgdorf
- 2026–: HØJ Elite
National team
Years	Team	Apps	(Gls)
2021–	Norway	60	(101)

Thomas Solstad (born 26 February 1997) is a Norwegian handball player for Høj Elite and the Norwegian national team.

He represented Norway at the 2021 World Men's Handball Championship.
