= Odd Nielsen =

Norwegian handball player

Personal information
- Nationality: Norwegian

Sport
- Sport: Handball
National team
Years	Team	Apps	(Gls)
1957–1959	Norway	11	(12)

Odd Nielsen is a Norwegian handball player.

He made his debut on the Norwegian national team in 1957, and played 11 matches for the national team between 1957 and 1959. He participated at the 1958 World Men's Handball Championship.
