= Einar Riegelhuth Koren =

Norwegian handball player (born 1984)

Personal information
- Born: 12 November 1984 (age 41) Tønsberg, Norway
- Height: 190 cm (75 in)

Sport
- Sport: Handball
- Position: Goalkeeper

Senior clubs
- Years: Team
- -2006: Runar Sandefjord
- 2006-2009: Haslum HK
- 2009-2010: FCK Håndbold
- 2010-2017: Haslum HK
National team
| Years | Team | Apps | (Gls) |
| 2006-2012 | Norway | 64 | (109) |

Einar Riegelhuth Koren (née Einar Sand Koren, 12 November 1984) is a Norwegian former handball player, who played for Runar Sandefjord and Haslum HK in his home country and for FCK Håndbold in Denmark. He made his debut on the Norwegian national team in 2006, and has played 7 matches and scored 12 goals. On 25 June 2011, Einar Sand Koren married Linn Kristin Riegelhuth, and changed his name to Einar Riegelhuth Koren.
