= Erik Thorsteinsen Toft =

Norwegian handball player (born 1992)

Personal information
- Nationality: Norwegian
- Born: 14 November 1992 (age 33) Elverum, Norway
- Height: 1.92 m (6 ft 4 in)

Sport
- Sport: Handball
- Position: Left Back
- Current club: Elverum Håndball

Senior clubs
- Years: Team
- 2010–2017: Elverum Håndball
- 2017–2022: Mors-Thy Håndbold
- 2022–2024: KIF Kolding
- 2024–: Elverum Håndball
National team
Years	Team	Apps	(Gls)
2020–	Norway	30	(59)

Erik Thorsteinsen Toft (born 14 November 1992) is a Norwegian handball player, who plays for Elverum Håndball and the Norwegian national team.

He represented Norway at the 2022 European Men's Handball Championship.
