= Frode Hagen =

Norwegian handball player (born 1974)

Personal information
- Nationality: Norwegian
- Born: 23 June 1974 (age 52) Drammen, Norway
- Height: 190 cm (75 in)

Sport
- Sport: Handball
- Position: Left Back

Senior clubs
- Years: Team
- –1997: Drammen HK
- 1997–1998: SG Flensburg-Handewitt
- 1998–2002: HSG Nordhorn
- 2002–2004: FC Barcelona Handbol
- 2004–2006: THW Kiel
- 2006–2008: Drammen HK
National team
Years	Team	Apps	(Gls)
1994–2008	Norway	188	(574)

Frode Hagen (born July 23, 1974) is a retired Norwegian handball player. He played 188 matches and scored 574 goals for the Norway men's national handball team between 1994 and 2008. He participated at the 2001 and 2005 World Men's Handball Championship.

Hagen was awarded the Håndballstatuetten trophy from the Norwegian Handball Federation in 2011.
