= Preben Vildalen =

Norwegian handball player (born 1972)

Personal information
- Nationality: Norwegian
- Born: 6 June 1972 (age 54) Kristiansand, Norway
- Height: 194 cm (76 in)

Sport
- Sport: Handball
- Position: Centre back / left back

Senior clubs
- Years: Team
- -1997: Kristiansands IF
- 1997-2000: Sandefjord TIF
- 2000-2003: ThSV Eisenach
- 2003-2005: SV Post Schwerin
- 2005-2007: Sandefjord TIF
- 2007: Øyestad IF Arendal
National team
Years	Team	Apps	(Gls)
1994–2007	Norway	201	(312)

Preben Vildalen (born 6 June 1972) is a Norwegian handball player. He played 201 matches and scored 312 goals for the Norway men's national handball team between 1994 and 2007. He participated at the 2001, 2005 and 2007 World Men's Handball Championship.

Vildalen was awarded the Håndballstatuetten trophy from the Norwegian Handball Federation in 2013.

== Private ==
His nephew Hermann Vildalen is also a handballer.
