= Frank Løke =

Norwegian handball player (born 1980)

Personal information
- Nationality: Norwegian
- Born: 6 February 1980 (age 46) Tønsberg, Norway
- Height: 1.93 m (6 ft 4 in)

Sport
- Sport: Handball
- Position: Pivot

Senior clubs
- Years: Team
- 1998–2003: Runar Sandefjord
- 2003–2004: SV Post Schwerin
- 2004–2005: FCK Håndbold
- 2005–2008: SG Flensburg-Handewitt
- 2005–2007: Grasshopper Club Zürich (loan)
- 2007–2008: ZMC Amicitia Zürich (loan)
- 2008–2009: ZMC Amicitia Zürich
- 2009–2010: RK Zagreb
- 2010: TuS N-Lübbecke (loan)
- 2010–2015: TuS N-Lübbecke
- 2015: Drammen HK
- 2016: Runar Sandefjord
National team
Years	Team	Apps	(Gls)
2001–2011	Norway	186	(646)

Frank Løke (born 6 February 1980) is a Norwegian endurance athlete, TV personality and former handball player.

== Career ==
Regarded as one of the best line players of his era, Løke played for clubs in Norway, Germany, Denmark, Croatia and Switzerland during his career. He was capped 186 times and scored 646 goals for the Norwegian national team, and was voted best pivot at the 2008 European Men's Handball Championship. Løke represented Norway at every World Championship and European Championship between 2005 and 2011.

== Post-playing career ==
Following his retirement from handball, Løke has competed in several Norwegian reality TV-shows. He competed in the Norwegian celebrity format version of The Farm in 2017 and Skal vi danse? in 2018. Løke won the reality competition 71° nord – Team together with partner Rikke Isaksen in 2023.

Løke has participated in multiple ultramarathon, ultra-distance cycling, triathlon and quadrathlon competitions, including the Norseman Triathlon and the Östhammar Adventure Race.

Løke climbed Mount Everest in 2021 and 2024, and K2 in 2022, becoming the third Norwegian to reach the latter's summit.

== Personal life ==
Løke's younger sister, Heidi, is also a handball player, having won the Olympic gold medal, two World Championships and four European Championships with the Norwegian national team.
