= Øystein Havang =

Norwegian handball player (born 1964)

Personal information
- Nationality: Norwegian
- Born: 3 September 1964 (age 62)

Sport
- Sport: Handball
- Position: Right back

Senior clubs
- Years: Team
- –1986: Tønsbergs TF
- 1986–1987: Oppsal IF
- 1987–1989: Fredensborg/Ski HK
- 1989–1992: TSV Bayer Dormagen
- 1992–1994: Sandefjord TIF
- 1994–1996: Grasshoppers
- 1996–2004: Sandefjord TIF
National team
Years	Team	Apps	(Gls)
1987–1997	Norway	187	(717)

Øystein Havang (born 3 September 1964) is a Norwegian handball player. He won national titles with Sandefjord TIF, and played for the national team over a period of ten years.

== Biography ==
Havang was born on 3 September 1964.

He played 187 matches and scored 717 goals for the Norway men's national handball team between 1987 and 1997. He participated at the 1993 and 1997 World Men's Handball Championships.

With his club Sandefjord TIF Havang won national titles in 1993, 1999 and 2004. He was top scorer in the Norwegian league in the 1997 and 1998 seasons.

Havang was awarded the Håndballstatuetten trophy from the Norwegian Handball Federation in 2011.
