= Henrik Jakobsen (handballer) =

Norwegian handball player (born 1992)

Personal information
- Nationality: Norwegian
- Born: 16 December 1992 (age 33) Lørenskog, Norway
- Height: 1.96 m (6 ft 5 in)

Sport
- Sport: Handball
- Position: Pivot
- Current club: GOG Håndbold
- Number: 9

Senior clubs
- Years: Team
- –: Fjellhammer IL
- –2015: Drammen HK
- 2015–2018: GOG Håndbold
- 2018–2021: Fenix Toulouse Handball
- 2021–2022: USAM Nîmes Gard
- 2022–2026: GOG Håndbold
- 2026–: Fredericia HK
National team
Years	Team	Apps	(Gls)
2015–	Norway	64	(66)
Medal record
World Championship
Silver medal – second place	2019 Germany/Denmark

Henrik Jakobsen (born 16 December 1992) is a Norwegian handball player for GOG Håndbold and the Norwegian national team.

He participated at the 2019 World Men's Handball Championship.

== Honours ==
- World Championship:
  - Silver: 2019
