= Agnar Hagen =

Norwegian handball player

Personal information
- Nationality: Norwegian

Sport
- Sport: Handball
National team
Years	Team	Apps	(Gls)
1953–1960	Norway	12	(14)

Agnar Hagen is a Norwegian handball player.

He made his debut on the Norwegian national team in 1953, and played 12 matches for the national team between 1953 and 1960. He participated at the 1958 World Men's Handball Championship.
