= Tormod Moldestad =

Norwegian handball player

Personal information
- Nationality: Norwegian
- Born: January 29, 1974 (age 52)

Sport
- Sport: Handball

Senior clubs
- Years: Team
- –: Bad Schwartau
- –: IL Runar Sandefjord
National team
Years	Team	Apps	(Gls)
1998-2001	Norway	32	(40)

Tormod Moldestad (born 29 January 1974) is a Norwegian handball player.

He made his debut on the Norwegian national team in 1998, and played 32 matches for the national team between 1998 and 2001. He competed at the 1999 and the 2001 World Men's Handball Championship.

At club level he played for Bad Schwartau in Germany and IL Runar Sandefjord in his home country.
