= Svein Sand =

Norwegian handball player

Personal information
- Nationality: Norwegian

Sport
- Sport: Handball
National team
Years	Team	Apps	(Gls)
1960–1965	Norway	18	(19)

Svein Sand is a Norwegian handball player.

He made his debut on the Norwegian national team in 1960, and played 18 matches for the national team between 1960 and 1965. He participated at the 1961 World Men's Handball Championship.
