= Sindre Walstad =

Norwegian handball player

Personal information
- Full name: Sindre Yngve Walstad
- Nationality: Norwegian
- Born: September 30, 1972 (age 54) Lørenskog, Norway
- Height: 196 cm (77 in)

Sport
- Sport: Handball
- Position: Goalkeeper

Youth career
- Years: Team
- –: Fjellhammer IL
- –: Bækkelagets SK

Senior clubs
- Years: Team
- –: Fredensborg/Ski
- -1997: Sandefjord TIF
- 1997-1999: HSG Dutenhofen
- 1999-2000: Viking Stavanger HK
- 2000-2002: SG Solingen
- 2002-2005: KIF Kolding
- 2005-2009: Sandefjord TIF
National team
Years	Team	Apps	(Gls)
1994-2006	Norway	85	(0)

Sindre Yngve Walstad (born 30 September 1972) is a Norwegian former handball player.

== National team ==
He made his debut on the Norwegian national team in 1994, and played 85 matches for the national team between 1994 and 2006. He competed at the 2005 World Men's Handball Championship.

== Club career ==
Walstad started playing handball at Fjellhammer IL, and later joined Bækkelagets SK followed by Fredensborg/Ski, where he made his senior debut. He then joined Sandefjord TIF, where he won the Norwegian Championship and Cup in 1991 and 1993.

He then joined HSG Dutenhofen in the German 2nd Handball-Bundesliga.

In 1999 he returned to Norway and joined Viking Stavanger HK. A year later he returned to Germany and joined SG Solingen.

In 2002 he joined Danish side KIF Kolding. Here he won the 2003 and 2005 Danish Championship and the 2005 Danish Cup. He is included in the KIF Kolding Hall of Fame. In 2005 he returned to Sandefjord TIF, where he won the 2006 Norwegian Championship. He retired in 2009.
