= Kevin Gulliksen =

Norwegian handball player (born 1996)

Personal information
- Full name: Kevin Maagerø Gulliksen
- Nationality: Norwegian
- Born: 9 November 1996 (age 29) Oslo, Norway
- Height: 1.80 m (5 ft 11 in)

Sport
- Sport: Handball
- Position: Right wing
- Current club: TTH Holstebro
- Number: 28

Senior clubs
- Years: Team
- –2017: Bækkelagets SK
- 2017–2018: Elverum Håndball
- 2018–2021: GWD Minden
- 2021–2023: Frisch Auf Göppingen
- 2023–2025: TTH Holstebro
- 2025–: Elverum Håndball
National team
Years	Team	Apps	(Gls)
2017–	Norway	115	(211)
Medal record
World Championship
Silver medal – second place	2019 Germany/Denmark
European Championship
Bronze medal – third place	2020 Sweden/Austria/Norway

Kevin Maagerø Gulliksen (born 9 November 1996) is a Norwegian handball player for TTH Holstebro and the Norwegian national team.

He participated at the 2019 World Men's Handball Championship.
