= Jon Narvestad =

Norwegian sportsperson and film distributor

Jon Narvestad (1932 – 7 January 2015) was a Norwegian sportsperson and film distributor.

His father presiding over the Norwegian Ice Hockey Association, Narvestad played hockey in his youth only to become a handball player. He was capped 21 times for the Norway men's national handball team. He participated at the 1958 World Men's Handball Championship.

He worked as a manager for Universal Pictures in Norway from 1957 and Fram Film from 1961. He was briefly director of information in Norsk Film from 1968, before working as the director of Warner Brothers in Norway between 1969 and 1999. He was also the first chairman of the Norwegian Film Distributors' Association.
