= Ingar Engum =

Norwegian handball player

Personal information
- Nationality: Norwegian

Sport
- Sport: Handball
National team
Years	Team	Apps	(Gls)
1961–1962	Norway	6	(1)

Ingar Engum is a Norwegian handball player.

He made his debut on the Norwegian national team in 1961, and played 6 matches for the national team between 1961 and 1962. He participated at the 1961 World Men's Handball Championship.
