= Harald Madsen (handballer) =

Norwegian handball player and coach (born 1953)

Personal information
- Nationality: Norwegian

Sport
- Sport: Handball
National team
Years	Team	Apps	(Gls)
1979–1981	Norway	17	(0)

Teams managed
- Years: Team
- 1980s–1990s: Urædd Håndball
- 1994–1997: Norway
- 2007-?: Lunner IL

Harald Madsen (born November 1953) is a Norwegian handball player and coach.

He made his debut on the Norwegian national team in 1979, and played 17 matches for the national team between 1979 and 1981.

He coached Urædd Håndball in the 1980s and 1990s. From 1994 to 1997 he was assigned as head coach for the Norway men's national handball team. He led the team to and during the 1997 World Men's Handball Championship, where Norway finished 12th. He withdrew from the position after the world cup due to health concerns and was replaced by Ivica Rimanić. Afterwards he has worked as an advisor to the Norwegian Handball Federation.

In 2007 he became the head coach of the 2nd division (3rd tier) side Lunner IL.
