= Jonas Wille =

Norwegian handball player and coach (born 1976)

Jonas Liberg Wille
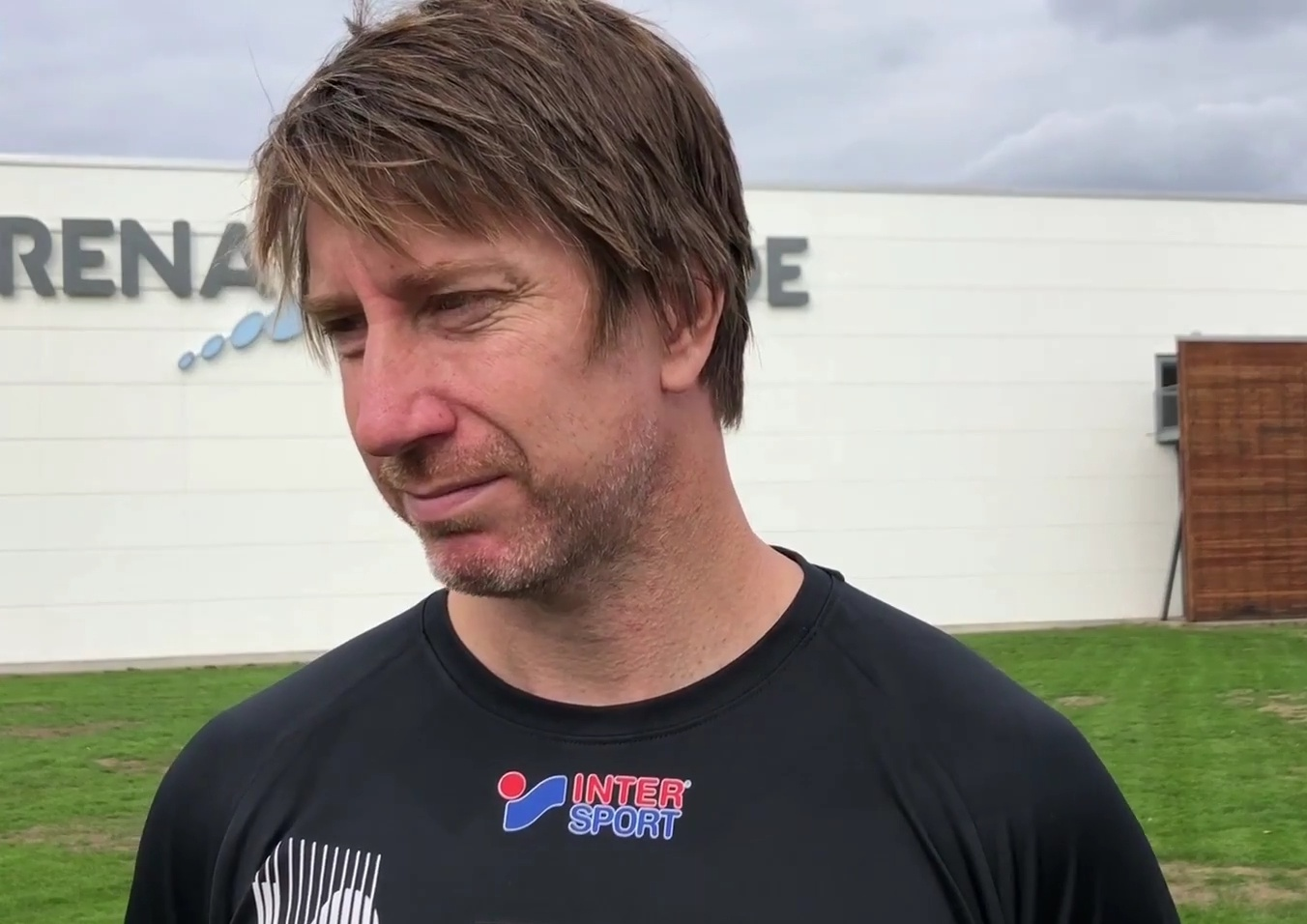
- Wille in 2018

Personal information
- Nationality: Norwegian
- Born: 20 May 1976 (age 50) Halden, Norway

Sport
- Sport: Handball
- Current club: Norway (manager)

Teams managed
- Years: Team
- 2007–2008: Fjellhammer IL
- 2008–2009: Stabæk IF
- 2009–2017: Halden Topphåndball
- 2017–2018: HC Midtjylland
- 2018–2020: IFK Skövde
- 2020–2021: Mors-Thy Håndbold
- 2021–2022: IFK Kristianstad
- 2022–2026: Norway
- 2026–: Kadetten Schaffhausen

Jonas Liberg Wille (born 20 May 1976) is a Norwegian former handball player and current coach of the Norwegian national team.

From September 2021 to April 2022 he was the assistant coach to Christian Berge of the Norwegian national team. In the summer of 2022 he took over as the head coach, when Berge left the position. After a disappointing 9th place at the 2026 European Championship, the Norwegian Handball Federation announced that they would not extend his contract past July 2026. He was offered to leave the position immediately, but chose to see out his contract. From the summer of 2026 he is the new head coach of Kadetten Schaffhausen.
