= Kjell Kleven =

Norwegian handball player and coach

Personal information
- Nationality: Norwegian

Sport
- Sport: Handball
National team
| Years | Team | Apps | (Gls) |
| 1960–1961 | Norway | 6 | (6) |

Teams managed
- Years: Team
- 1965–1970: Norway

Kjell Kleven is a Norwegian handball player and coach.

He made his debut on the Norwegian national team in 1960, and played 6 matches for the national team in 1960 and 1961. He participated at the 1961 World Men's Handball Championship.

Kleven was head coach for the Norway men's national handball team from 1965 to 1970.
