= Harald Tyrdal =

Norwegian handball player (born 1946)

Harald Tyrdal (born 25 November 1946) is a retired Norwegian handball player who competed in the 1972 Summer Olympics.

He was born in Oslo and represented the club Refstad IL. In 1972 he was part of the Norwegian team which finished ninth in the Olympic tournament. He played four matches and scored twelve goals. He was capped 120 times in total. His honors include a cup championship and two league titles, and he became Player of the Year in Norway's top league in 1978.

After his active career he became a businessman. He was the CEO of Narvesen ASA from 1989 to 2000, in Reitan Narvesen ASA from 2000 to 2001 and in Optimera from 2002.
