= Finn Arne Johansen =

Norwegian handball player

Personal information
- Nationality: Norwegian

Sport
- Sport: Handball
National team
Years	Team	Apps	(Gls)
1957–1964	Norway	25	(18)

Finn Arne Johansen is a Norwegian handball player.

== Career ==
He made his debut on the Norwegian national team in 1957, and played 25 matches for the national team between 1957 and 1964. He participated at the 1958, 1961 and 1964 World Men's Handball Championship.
