= Roger Kvannli =

Norwegian handball player

Personal information
- Nationality: Norwegian
- Born: April 21, 1969 (age 57)

Sport
- Sport: Handball

Senior clubs
- Years: Team
- –: Heimdal Håndball
- 2000–2002: HSG Wetzlar
- 2002–?: Heimdal Håndball
National team
Years	Team	Apps	(Gls)
2000–2001	Norway	20	(18)

Teams managed
- 2014–2017: Byåsen HE (assistant)
- 2017–2018: Byåsen HE

Roger Kvannli (born 21 April 1969) is a Norwegian handball player and coach.

He made his debut on the Norwegian national team in 2000, and played 20 matches for the national team between 2000 and 2001. He competed at the 2001 World Men's Handball Championship.

As a youth player, Kvannli played soccer more than handball, and only switched to handball aged 16. As a senior, Kvannli played for Heimdal Håndball and HSG Wetzlar.

From 2014 to 2017 he was the assistant coach at Byåsen HE. He then took over as head coach after Arne Högdahl. He was in this position until 2019, when he was fired due to bad results in the fall of 2018.
