= Magnus Fredriksen =

Norwegian handball player (born 1997)

Personal information
- Nationality: Norwegian
- Born: 24 May 1997 (age 29) Vestfossen, Norway
- Height: 1.88 m (6 ft 2 in)

Sport
- Sport: Handball
- Position: Centre back
- Current club: SønderjyskE
- Number: 29

Senior clubs
- Years: Team
- 2017–2020: Elverum Håndball
- 2020–2024: HSG Wetzlar
- 2024–: SønderjyskE
National team
Years	Team	Apps	(Gls)
2018–	Norway	35	(19)
- Updated on 28 January 2026

Magnus Fredriksen (born 24 May 1997) is a Norwegian handball player for SønderjyskE and formerly the Norwegian national team.

He made his debut for the Norwegian national team in April 2018, and was selected for the extended squad for the 2019 World Men's Handball Championship.
