= Rune Skjærvold =

Norwegian handball player (born 1974)

Personal information
- Nationality: Norwegian
- Born: 13 September 1974 (age 52) Stavanger, Norway
- Height: 188 cm (74 in)

Sport
- Sport: Handball
- Position: Right wing
National team
Years	Team	Apps	(Gls)
1995–2008	Norway	110	(227)

Rune Skjærvold (born 13 September 1974) is a Norwegian handball player.

He made his debut on the Norwegian national team in 1995, and played 110 matches for the national team between 1995 and 2008. He competed at the 2001, 2005 and 2007 World Men's Handball Championship.
