= Hans Lien =

Norwegian handball player

Personal information
- Nationality: Norwegian

Sport
- Sport: Handball
National team
Years	Team	Apps	(Gls)
1955–1960	Norway	10	(23)

Hans Lien is a Norwegian handball player.

He made his debut on the Norwegian national team in 1955, and played 10 matches for the national team between 1955 and 1960. He participated at the 1958 World Men's Handball Championship.
