= André Kristensen =

Norwegian handball player (born 2000)

André Bergsholm Kristensen
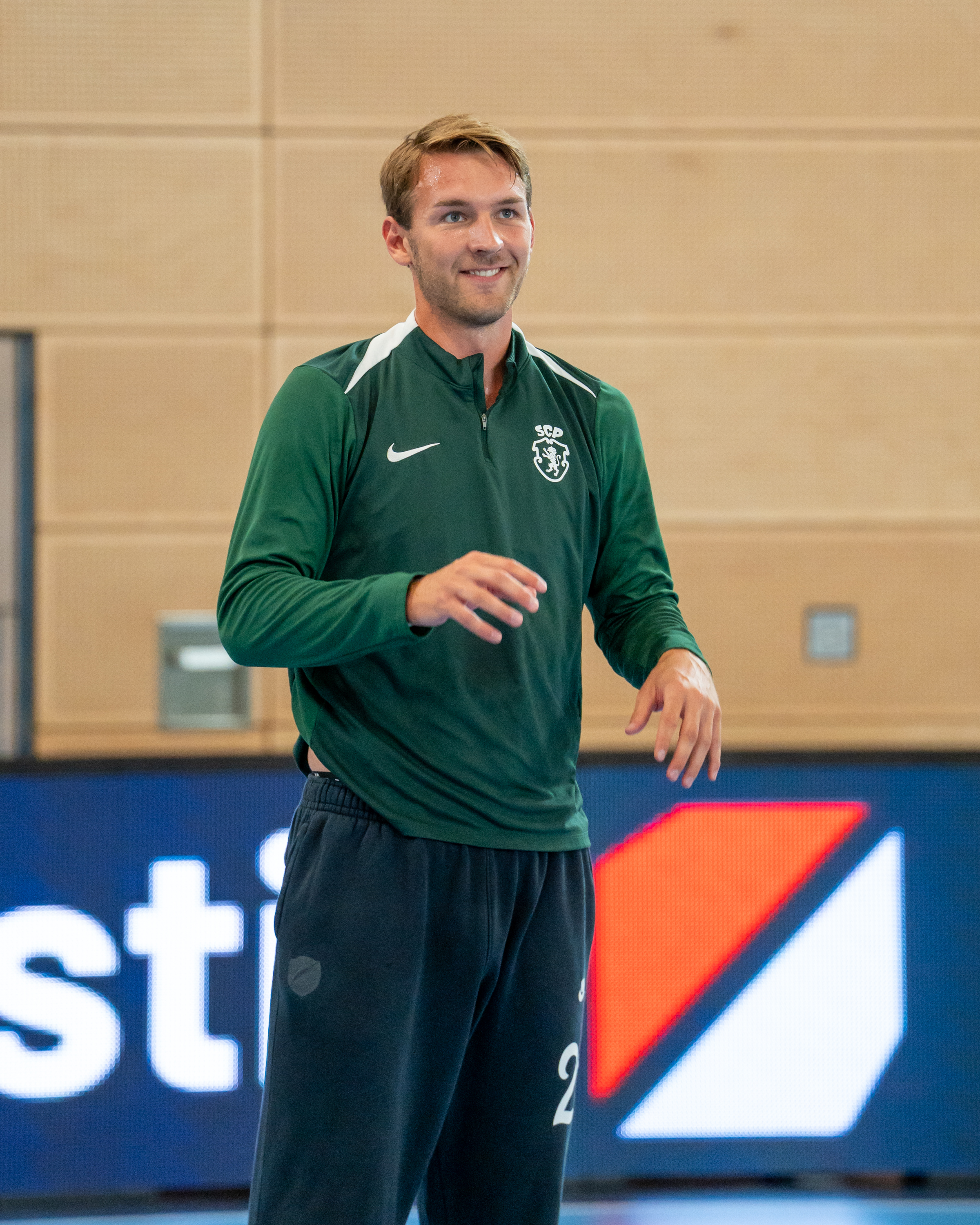

Personal information
- Nationality: Norwegian
- Born: 15 March 2000 (age 26) Sandefjord, Norway
- Height: 1.92 m (6 ft 4 in)

Sport
- Sport: Handball
- Position: Goalkeeper
- Current club: Sporting CP
- Number: 20

Senior clubs
- Years: Team
- 2016–2018: Sandefjord Håndball
- 2018–2021: ØIF Arendal
- 2021–11/2022: Drammen HK
- 12/2022–2027: Sporting CP
- 2027–: HØJ Elite
National team
Years	Team	Apps	(Gls)
2024–	Norway	17	(0)

André Bergsholm Kristensen (born 15 March 2000) is a Norwegian handball player for Sporting CP and the Norwegian national team.

On 17 December 2024, he was selected to represent Norway at the 2025 World Men's Handball Championship.

== Career ==
Kristensen is from Sandefjord, Norway. He is a well known goalkeeper. During the first half of the 2024/2025 season, he had the highest save percentage among his club Sporting CP in the EHF Champions League.
