= Johnny Jensen =

Norwegian handball player (born 1972)

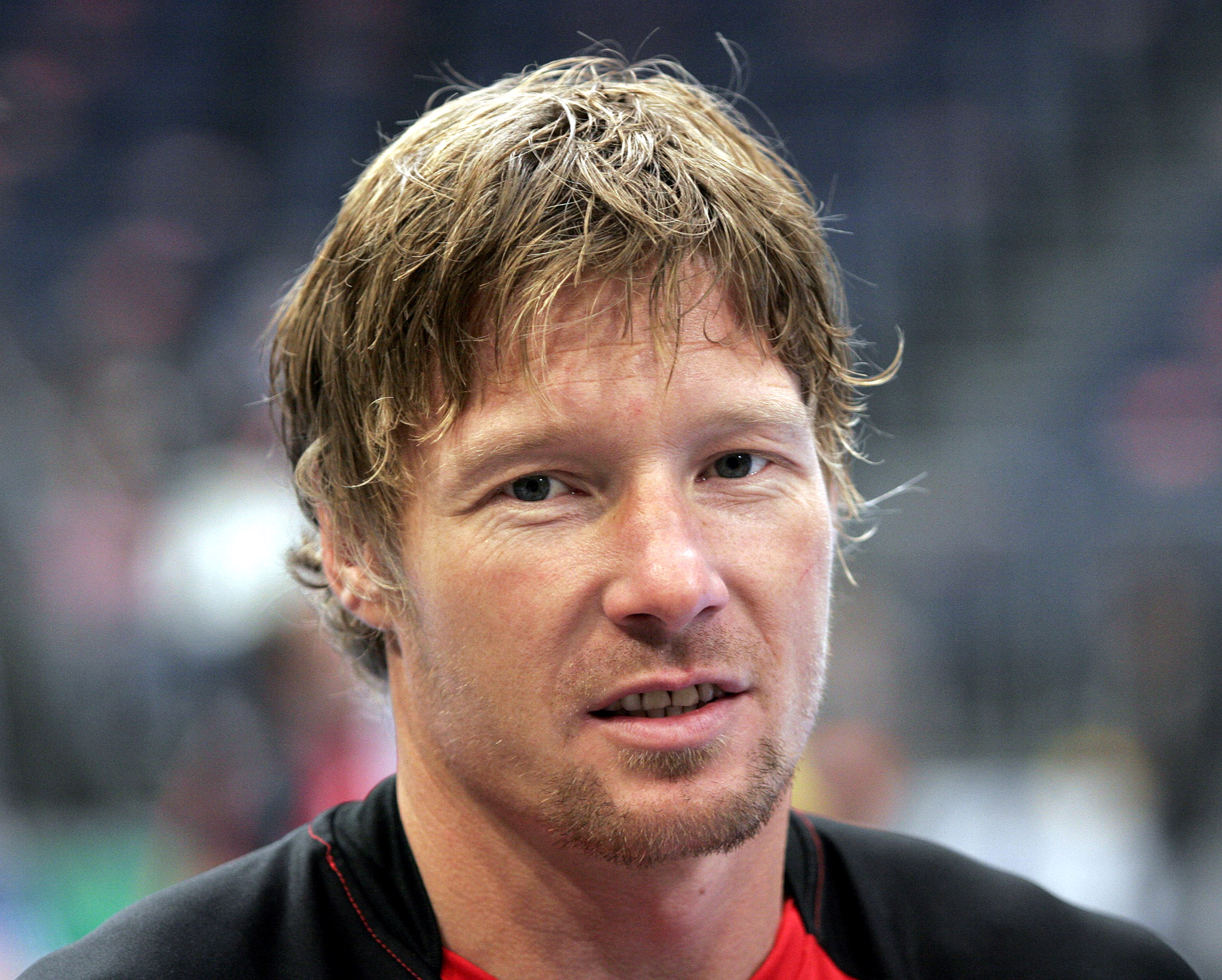

Personal information
- Nationality: Norwegian
- Born: 17 February 1972 (age 54) Sandefjord, Norway
- Height: 190 cm (75 in)

Sport
- Sport: Handball
- Position: Pivot

Senior clubs
- Years: Team
- 1987–1999: Sandefjord TIF
- 1999–2001: SG Flensburg-Handewitt
- 2001–2003: ThSV Eisenach
- 2003–2010: SG Flensburg-Handewitt
- 2010–20133: Nøtterøy IF
National team
Years	Team	Apps	(Gls)
1995–2009	Norway	191	(287)

Teams managed
- 2013–2016: Nøtterøy IF

Johnny Jensen (born 17 February 1972 in Sandefjord) is a Norwegian handball player and coach. He played 191 matches and scored 287 goals for the Norway men's national handball team between 1995 and 2009. He participated at the 2001, 2005, 2007 and 2009 World Men's Handball Championship.

Jensen was awarded the Håndballstatuetten trophy from the Norwegian Handball Federation in 2019.
