= Lars Erik Bjørnsen =

Norwegian handball player (born 1982)

Personal information
- Full name: Lars Erik Bjørnsen
- Nationality: Norwegian
- Born: 20 July 1982 (age 44) Bardu, Norway
- Height: 1.83 m (6 ft 0 in)

Sport
- Sport: Handball
- Position: Right back
- Current club: Retired

Youth career
- Years: Team
- -2000: Bardu IL

Senior clubs
- Years: Team
- 2000-2007: Kragerø IF
- 2007-2011: Team Tvis Holstebro (Denmark)
- 2011-2014: Drammen HK
- 2014-2015: ØIF Arendal
National team
Years	Team	Apps	(Gls)
2003-2016	Norway	103	(203)

Lars Erik Bjørnsen (born 20 July 1982) is a Norwegian handball player. He has played 75 matches for the Norway men's national handball team between 2003 and 2011. He participated at the 2009 World Men's Handball Championship.
