= Stig Penne =

Norwegian handball player

Personal information
- Nationality: Norwegian
- Born: May 23, 1973 (age 53)

Sport
- Sport: Handball
- Position: Left Wing

Senior clubs
- Years: Team
- –2003: Viking Stavanger HK
National team
Years	Team	Apps	(Gls)
1996–2002	Norway	80	(163)

Stig Penne (born 23 May 1973) is a Norwegian former handball player.

He made his debut on the Norwegian national team in 1996, and played 80 matches for the national team between 1996 and 2002. He competed at the 1999 and 2001 World Men's Handball Championship.

He retired from playing in 2003 after 13 years at the top level. After his playing days he has worked for Telenor.
