= Simen Holand Pettersen =

Norwegian handball player (born 1998)

Personal information
- Nationality: Norwegian
- Born: 8 April 1998 (age 28) Tønsberg, Norway
- Height: 1.92 m (6 ft 4 in)

Sport
- Sport: Handball
- Position: Left back
- Current club: Chambéry Savoie
- Number: 17

Senior clubs
- Years: Team
- 2016–2018: Sandefjord TIF
- 2018–2022: Elverum Håndball
- 2021: → US Ivry Handball (loan)
- 2022–2024: Skjern Håndbold
- 2024–: Chambéry Savoie
National team
Years	Team	Apps	(Gls)
2019–	Norway	23	(36)

Simen Holand Pettersen (born 8 April 1998) is a Norwegian handball player for Chambéry Savoie and the Norwegian national team.

He represented Norway at the 2021 World Men's Handball Championship.

He is a son of handball coach and former handball player Gunnar Pettersen.
