= Vetle Eck Aga =

Norwegian handball player (born 1993)

Personal information
- Nationality: Norwegian
- Born: 4 October 1993 (age 33) Bodø, Norway
- Height: 1.93 m (6 ft 4 in)

Sport
- Sport: Handball
- Position: Centre back
- Current club: Kolstad Håndball
- Number: 4

Youth career
- Years: Team
- –2010: Bodø HK

Senior clubs
- Years: Team
- 2010–2017: Bodø HK
- 2017–2022: IK Sävehof
- 2022–: Kolstad Håndball
National team
Years	Team	Apps	(Gls)
2021–	Norway	81	(4)

Vetle Eck Aga (born 4 October 1993) is a Norwegian handball player for Kolstad Håndball and the Norwegian national team.

He represented Norway at the 2022 European Men's Handball Championship.
