= Steffen Berg Løkkebø =

Norwegian handball player (born 1987)

Personal information
- Full name: Steffen Berg Løkkebø
- Nationality: Norwegian
- Born: 3 November 1987 (age 38)
- Height: 1.80 m (5 ft 11 in)

Sport
- Sport: Handball
- Position: Right wing
- Current club: Retired

Senior clubs
- Years: Team
- -2010: Sandefjord TIF
- 2010-2013: Follo HK
- 2013-2015: TV Emsdetten
- 2015-2017: Falk Håndball Horten
- 2017-?: Nøtterøy Handball
National team
Years	Team	Apps	(Gls)
2011-?	Norway	22	(47)

Steffen Berg Løkkebø (born 3 November 1987) is a Norwegian handball former player who played for the Norwegian national team.

== Career ==
Løkkebø started his career at Sandefjord TIF and joined Follo HK. In the 2012-2013 season he scored 135 goals, which made him the fourth best goalscorer in the Norwegian league. This prompted as move to the German team TV Emsdetten. In 2015 he returned to Norway to join Falk Håndball Horten. In 2017 he joined Nøtterøy Handball.
