= Thomas Pettersen =

Norwegian handball player

Personal information
- Nationality: Norwegian
- Born: April 20, 1976 (age 50)

Sport
- Sport: Handball

Senior clubs
- Years: Team
- –: Sandefjord
National team
Years	Team	Apps	(Gls)
1998–2001	Norway	21	(31)

Thomas Pettersen (born 20 April 1976) is a Norwegian handball player.

He made his debut on the Norwegian national team in 1998, and played 21 matches for the national team between 1998 and 2001. He competed at the 1999 World Men's Handball Championship, where Norway finished 13th.
