= Jonny Hovde =

Norwegian handball player

Personal information
- Nationality: Norwegian

Sport
- Sport: Handball
National team
Years	Team	Apps	(Gls)
1955–1961	Norway	16	(21)

Jonny Hovde is a Norwegian handball player.

He made his debut on the Norwegian national team in 1955, and played 16 matches for the national team between 1955 and 1961. He participated at the 1958 World Men's Handball Championship.
