= Simen Lyse =

Norwegian handball player (born 2000)

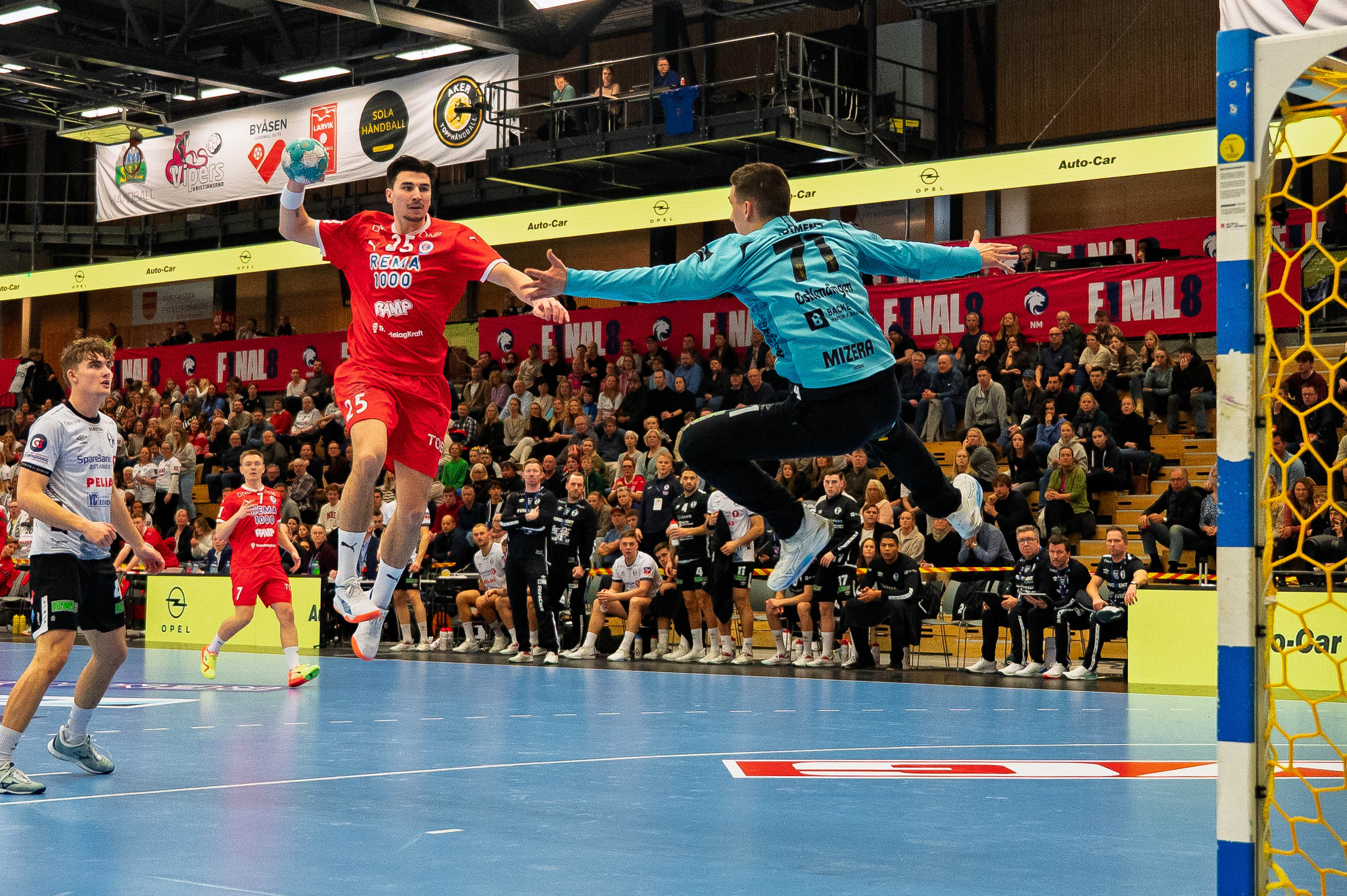
- Simen Lyse for Kolstad in the Norwegian Championship Final game, 2023

Personal information
- Full name: Simen Ulstad Lyse
- Nationality: Norwegian
- Born: 1 February 2000 (age 26) Trondheim, Norway
- Height: 1.99 m (6 ft 6 in)

Sport
- Sport: Handball
- Position: Left back
- Current club: Paris Saint-Germain
- Number: 25

Youth career
- Years: Team
- –: Klæbu IL

Senior clubs
- Years: Team
- –2020: Charlottenlund SK
- 2020–12/2025: Kolstad Håndball
- 01/2026–: Paris Saint-Germain
National team
| Years | Team | Apps | (Gls) |
| 2023– | Norway | 47 | (139) |

Simen Ulstad Lyse (born 1 February 2000) is a Norwegian handball player for Paris Saint-Germain and the Norwegian national team.

Lyse made his debut on the national team in November 2023 against Netherlands. On 11 December 2023, he was selected to represent Norway at the 2024 European Men's Handball Championship.

== Club career ==
Simen Lyse started his career in Klæbu IL until he joined Charlottenlund SK in 2018.

In 2020, he signed for Kolstad Håndball.

In 2022/2023, Lyse won the domestic treble with Kolstad Håndball, winning the league, the cup and the league play-offs.

In the 2023/2024 season, Lyse again won the domestic triple with Kolstad Handball, winning the league, the cup and the league play-offs. In February 2025 he extended his contract with Kolstad until 2027.
