= Gunnar Fosseng =

Norwegian handball goalkeeper (born 1967)

Personal information
- Nationality: Norwegian
- Born: 7 August 1967 (age 59) Horten, Norway

Sport
- Sport: Handball
- Position: Goalkeeper
National team
Years	Team	Apps	(Gls)
1987–2003	Norway	164	(3)

Gunnar "Gurken" Fosseng (born 7 August 1967) is a Norwegian handball goalkeeper. He made his debut on the Norwegian national team in 1987, and played 164 matches for the national team between 1987 and 2003. At the 2001 World Men's Handball Championship he was captain for the Norwegian team.

On club level he played for Falk, Sandefjord, Stavanger, Nøtterøy, for Pilotes Posada Academia Octavio (Spain) (1999–2002) and for Trelleborg in Sweden.

Fosseng was awarded the Håndballstatuetten trophy from the Norwegian Handball Federation in 2013.
