= Jon Arne Gunnerud =

Norwegian handball player

Personal information
- Nationality: Norwegian

Sport
- Sport: Handball
National team
Years	Team	Apps	(Gls)
1962–1969	Norway	33	(35)

Jon Arne Gunnerud is a Norwegian handball player.

He made his debut on the Norwegian national team in 1962, and played 33 matches for the national team between 1962 and 1969. He participated at the 1967 World Men's Handball Championship.
