= Jan Flatla =

Norwegian jurist, diplomat, and handball player (born 1935)

Personal information
- Nationality: Norwegian
- Born: 12 March 1935 (age 91) Oslo

Sport
- Sport: Handball
National team
Years	Team	Apps	(Gls)
1957–1959	Norway	13	(25)

Jan Flatla (born 12 March 1935) is a Norwegian jurist, diplomat and handball player.

== Early and personal life ==
Flatla was born in Oslo on 12 March 1935, a son of Johannes Larsen Flatla and Ragna Kirkeby.

He made his debut on the Norwegian national team in 1957, and played 13 matches for the national team between 1957 and 1959. He participated at the 1958 World Men's Handball Championship.

== Career ==
Flatla graduated from the University of Oslo in 1962, was a deputy judge in Vinger and Odal for one year and completed his training to become a diplomat in 1966. Among others he served as a vice consul in New Orleans, embassy secretary in Helsinki and embassy councillor in London. He was Norway's ambassador to the Netherlands from 1999 to 2003.

Since 1994 he is a commander of Order of St. Olav for his service to the country. He holds the grand cross of Order of Orange-Nassau.
