= Frode Scheie =

Norwegian handball player and coach (born 1967)

Personal information
- Nationality: Norwegian
- Born: 19 March 1967 (age 59) Drøbak, Norway

Sport
- Sport: Handball
- Position: Goalkeeper

Senior clubs
- Years: Team
- –: SG Flensburg-Handewitt
National team
Years	Team	Apps	(Gls)
1995–2002	Norway	105	(0)

Teams managed
- 2003–2007: Bækkelagets SK
- 2013–2014: Follo HK

Frode Scheie (born 19 March 1967) is a Norwegian handball coach and former player.

He made his debut on the Norwegian national team in 1995, and played 105 matches for the national team between 1995 and 2002. He participated at the 1999 World Men's Handball Championship where the Norwegian team placed 13th, and he served as captain for Norway at the 2000 European Men's Handball Championship. Scheie has been sports commentator for the television channel TV 2 Norway and for Viasat.

Scheie was awarded the Håndballstatuetten trophy from the Norwegian Handball Federation in 2013.

In the 2020s, Scheie entered politics for the Pensioners' Party. He was elected to Frogn municipal council.
