= André Jørgensen =

Norwegian handball player (born 1979)

Personal information
- Full name: André Marius Jørgensen Hofstøl
- Nationality: Norwegian (Norway)
- Born: April 9, 1979 (age 47)
- Height: 199 cm (78 in)

Sport
- Sport: Handball
- Position: Left back
- Current club: Retired

Youth career
- Years: Team
- –: ØIF Arendal

Senior clubs
- Years: Team
- -2000: Kristiansands IF
- 2000-2003: Runar Sandefjord
- 2003-2006: Bidasoa Irún
- 2003-2006: AaB Håndbold
- 2009-2010: GOG Svendborg TGI
- 2010-2015: ØIF Arendal
National team
Years	Team	Apps	(Gls)
2001-	Norway	117	(266)

Teams managed
- 2021-2022: ØIF Arendal

André Marius Jørgensen Hofstøl (born April 9, 1979) is a Norwegian handball coach and former player. He is considered a club legend at ØIF Arendal, where his number is retired.

== Career ==
He started playing handball at ØIF Arendal. In 2000 he joined Norwegian top club Runar Sandefjord, where he won the 2001 Norwegian Cup. In April 2006 he joined Spanish team CD Bidasoa.

In 2006 he joined Danish team AaB Håndbold. In 2009 he joined league rivals GOG Håndbold. When the club went bankrupt in 2010 he was released of his contract, and returned to his childhood club ØIF Arendal. Here he won the Norwegian Cup for a second time in 2014. This was the first time the club won the trophy. He retired after the 2014-15 season, and the club decided to retire his shirt number.

Jørgensen was a regular member of the Norwegian national handball team, having made more than 100 appearances during his career.

From 2021 to 2022 he was the coach at ØIF Arendal, where he also played.
