= Oddvar Klepperås =

Norwegian handball player

Personal information
- Nationality: Norwegian

Sport
- Sport: Handball
National team
Years	Team	Apps	(Gls)
1955–1968	Norway	61	(0)

Oddvar Klepperås is a Norwegian handball player.

He made his debut on the Norwegian national team in 1955, and played 61 matches for the national team between 1955 and 1968. He participated at the 1958, 1964 and 1967 World Men's Handball Championship.

He received the Handball Statuet in 2000.
