= Marius Riise =

Norwegian handball player

Personal information
- Nationality: Norwegian
- Born: 22 April 1974 (age 52)
- Height: 180 cm (71 in)

Sport
- Sport: Handball
- Position: Left wing

Senior clubs
- Years: Team
- –: Nordstrand IF
- -1998: Drammen HK
- 1998-2001: HSG Nordhorn
- 2001-2002: Drammen HK
- 2002-2005: Drammen HK
- 2005-2006: Haslum HK
- 2007-2009: Bækkelagets SK
National team
Years	Team	Apps	(Gls)
1997-2005	Norway	57	(142)

Marius Riise (born 22 April 1974) is a Norwegian former handball player.

He made his debut on the Norwegian national team in 1997, and played 57 matches for the national team between 1997 and 2005. He competed at the 2005 World Men's Handball Championship.
