= Arnulf Bæk =

Norwegian handball player (born 1943)

Hein Arnulf Bæk (born 16 August 1943) is a retired Norwegian handball player who competed in the 1972 Summer Olympics.

He was born in Trysil Municipality. In 1972, he was part of the Norwegian team which finished ninth in the Olympic tournament. He played one match, the group match against West Germany. He competed for the clubs Elverum IL and Oslostudentenes IK, and was capped 53 times for Norway.

He competed at the 1964 World Men's Handball Championship, and at the 1967 World Men's Handball Championship.
