= Magnus Dahl =

Norwegian handball player (born 1988)

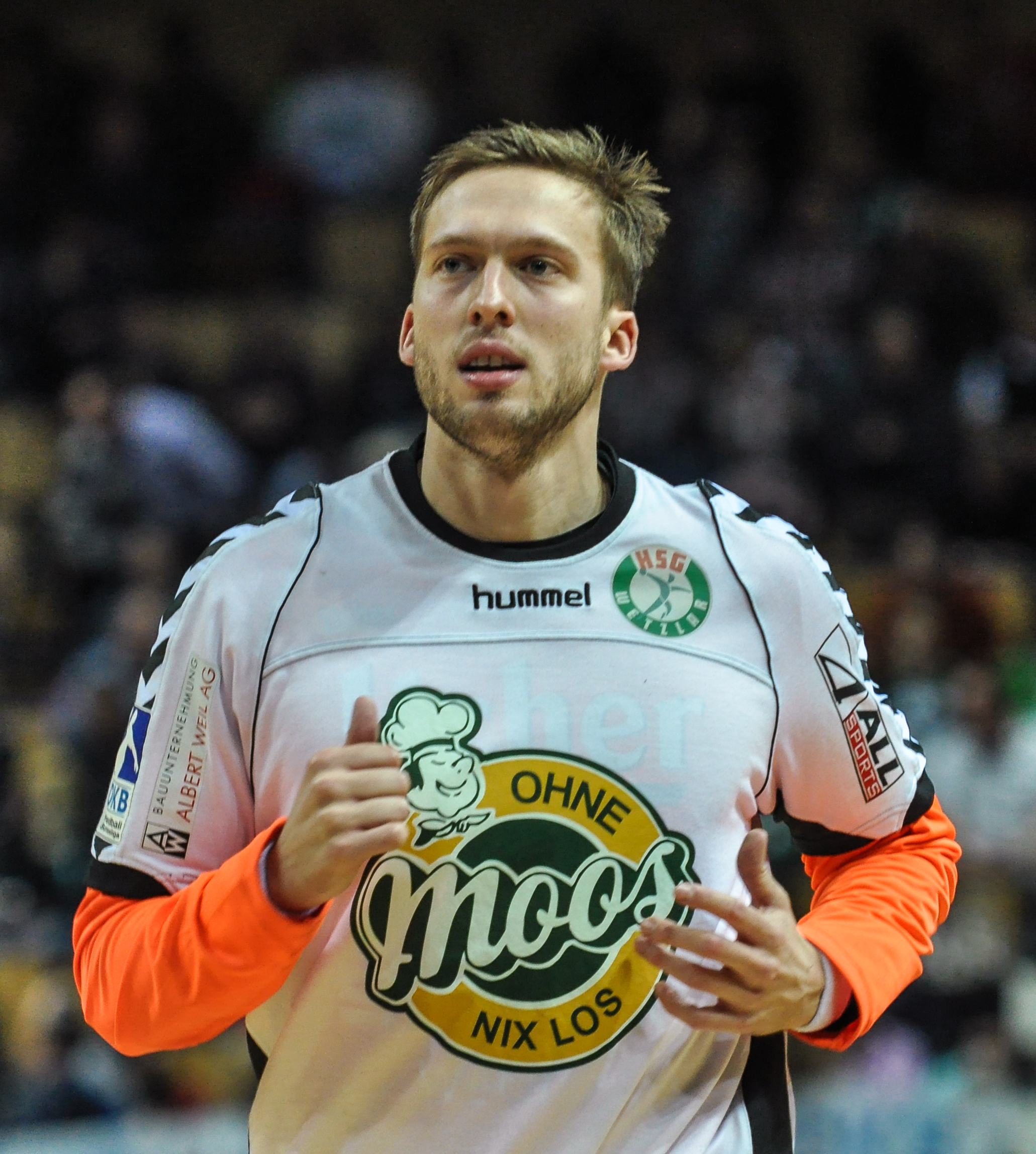
- Magnus Dahl playing for HSG Wetzlar against HSV Hamburg in February 2014

Personal information
- Nationality: Norwegian
- Born: 28 September 1988 (age 38) Oslo, Norway
- Height: 1.98 m (6 ft 6 in)

Sport
- Sport: Handball
- Position: Goalkeeper
- Current club: Skjern Håndbold
- Number: 12

Senior clubs
- Years: Team
- -2006: Nordstrand IF
- 2006-2007: Follo Håndball
- 2008-2010: Fyllingen Håndball
- 2010-2012: PSG Handball
- 2012-2013: BM Atlético Madrid
- 2013-2015: HSG Wetzlar
- 2015: IFK Kristianstad
- 2015-2017: Skjern Håndbold
National team
Years	Team	Apps	(Gls)
2009-2017	Norway	53	(0)

Magnus Dahl (born 28 September 1988) is a Norwegian former handball player, who featured for the Norwegian national team.

== Career ==
Dahl started playing at Nordstrand IF. In Norway he also played for Follo HK und Fyllingen Håndball. With the latter he won the Norwegian Championship in 2009. In 2010 he moved to French club PSG Handball, where he played for two years before moving to Spain at BM Atlético Madrid. In 2015 he moved to Swedish side IFK Kristianstad, where he played for a single season, in which he won the Swedish Championship.

His last club was Danish club Skjern Håndbold, where he won the Danish Cup in 2016. He retired in 2017.
