= Robert Wagtskjold =

Norwegian handball player

Personal information
- Nationality: Norwegian

Sport
- Sport: Handball
National team
Years	Team	Apps	(Gls)
1970–1971	Norway	7	(8)

Robert Wagtskjold is a Norwegian handball player.

He made his debut on the Norwegian national team in 1970, and played 7 matches for the national team between 1970 and 1971. He participated at the 1970 World Men's Handball Championship.
