= Bjørn Erik Sandsten =

Norwegian handball player

Personal information
- Nationality: Norwegian

Sport
- Sport: Handball
National team
Years	Team	Apps	(Gls)
1958–1966	Norway	21	(26)

Bjørn Erik Sandsten is a Norwegian handball player.

He made his debut on the Norwegian national team in 1958, and played 21 matches for the national team between 1958 and 1966. He participated at the 1961 World Men's Handball Championship.
