= Knut Reese Larsen =

Norwegian handball player

Personal information
- Nationality: Norwegian
- Born: April 20, 1938 (age 88) Oslo, Norway

Sport
- Sport: Handball
National team
Years	Team	Apps	(Gls)
1957–1964	Norway	31	(44)

Knut Reese Larsen (born 22 April 1938) is a Norwegian former handball player.

He made his debut on the Norwegian national team in 1957, and played 31 matches for the national team between 1957 and 1964. He participated at the 1958 and 1961 World Men's Handball Championship.
