= Knut Håland =

Norwegian handball player (born 1965)

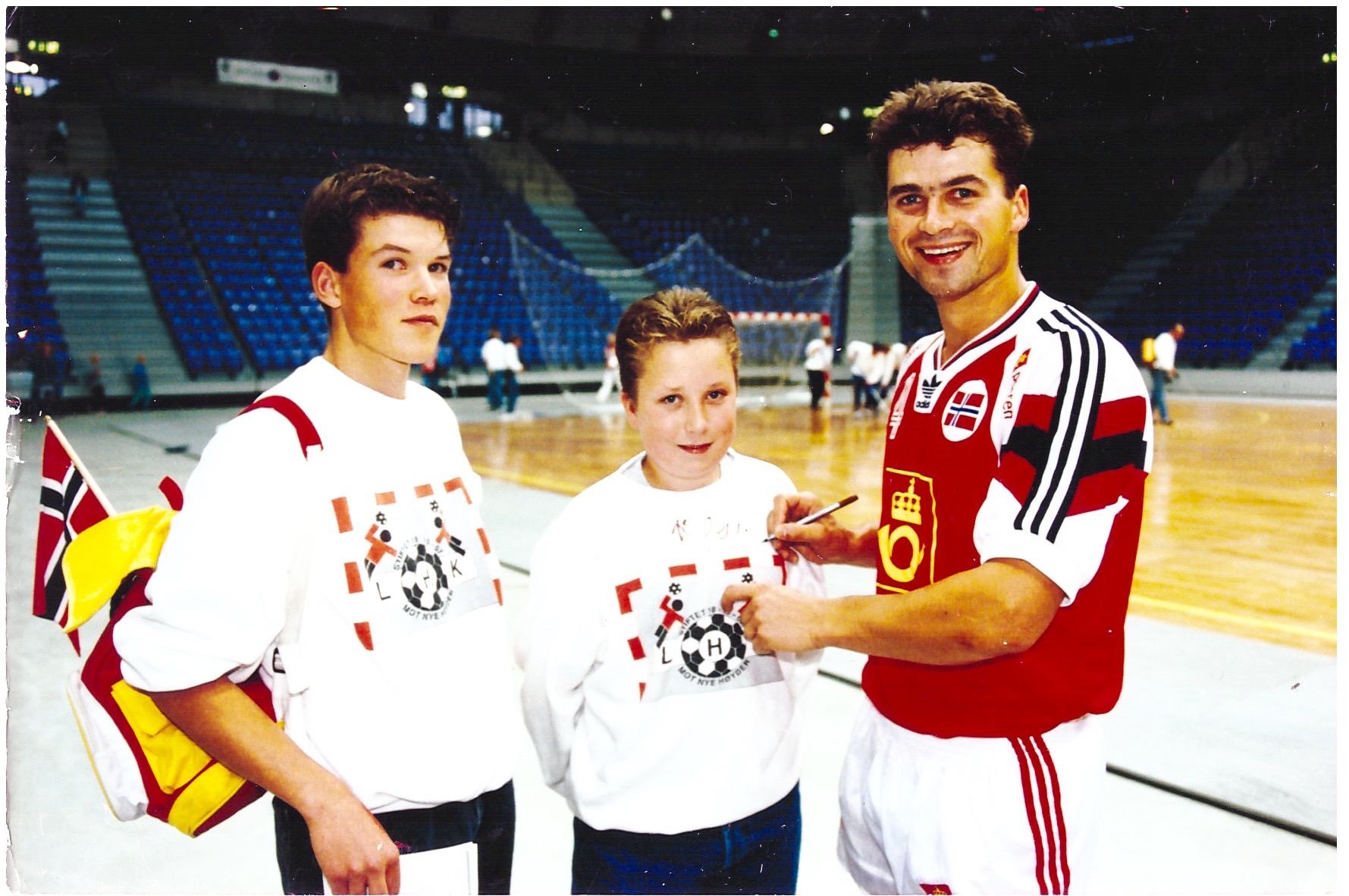
- Knut Håland (right) in 1993

Personal information
- Nationality: Norwegian
- Born: 11 February 1965 (age 61) Stavanger, Norway

Sport
- Sport: Handball
- Position: Pivot
- Number: 8

Youth career
- Years: Team
- 1977–1981: Lillehammer HK

Senior clubs
- Years: Team
- 1981–1987: Lillehammer HK
- 1987–1992: Fredensborg/Ski
- 1992–1994: Stavanger IF
- 1994–1995: Fredensborg/Ski
- 1995–1998: Bækkelagets SK (playing coach)
National team
Years	Team	Apps	(Gls)
1990–1993	Norway	30	(29)

Knut Håland (born 11 February 1965) is a Norwegian former handball player.

He made his debut on the Norwegian national team in 1990, and played 30 matches for the national team between 1990 and 1993. He participated at the 1993 World Men's Handball Championship, where Norway finished 13th.
