= Stian Vatne =

Norwegian handball player (born 1974)

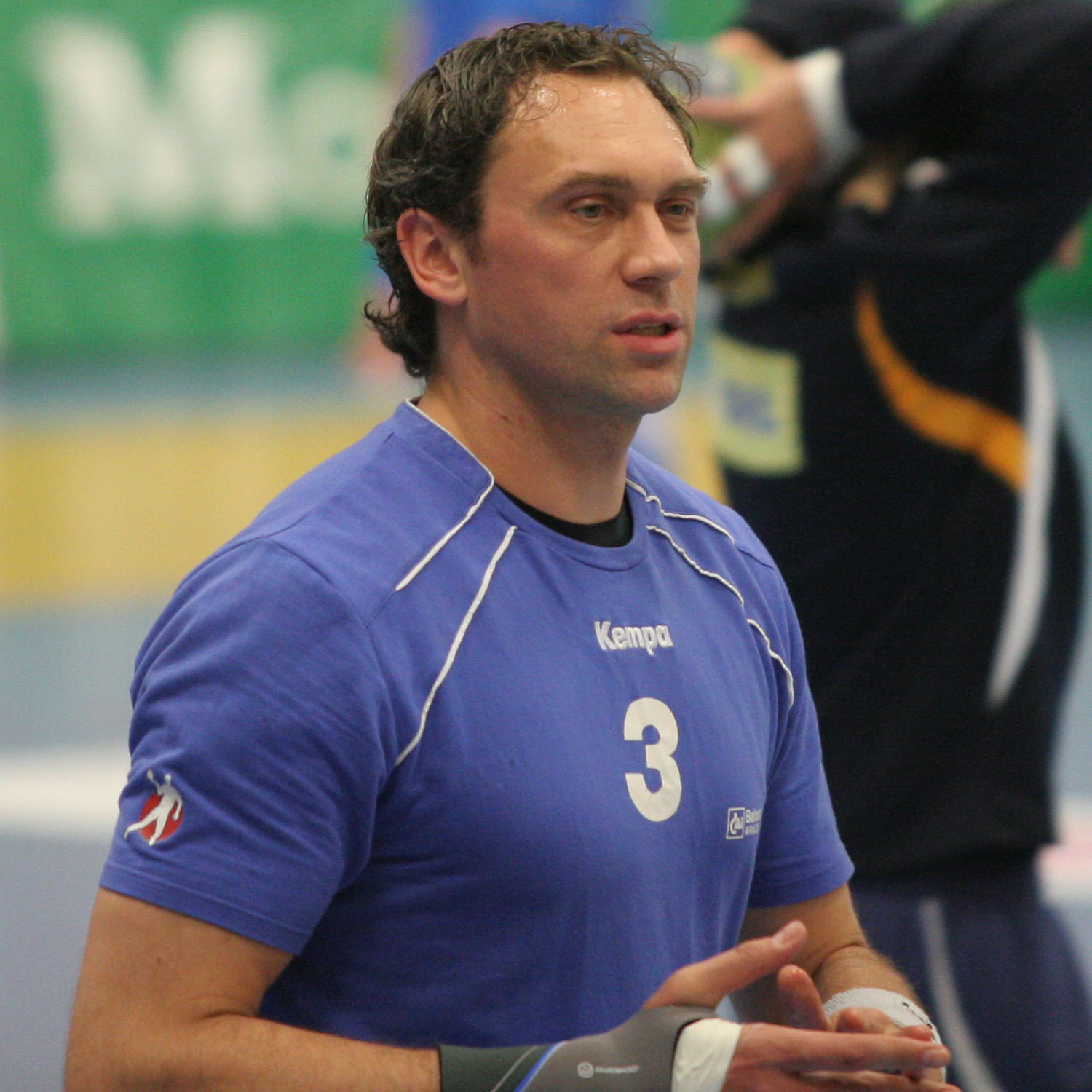
- Stian Vatne at the 26th of April 2009 in Gummersbach

Personal information
- Full name: Stian Fredrik Vatne
- Nationality: Norwegian
- Born: 10 May 1974 (age 52) Molde, Norway
- Height: 1.99 m (6 ft 6 in)

Sport
- Sport: Handball
- Position: Right back

Senior clubs
- Years: Team
- 1994: Molde HK
- 1994–1997: Stavanger IF
- 1997–2001: Kadetten Schaffhausen
- 2001–2002: Stavanger IF
- 2002–2005: Ademar León
- 2005–2006: Algeciras BM
- 2006–2009: BM Aragón
- 2009–2011: Füchse Berlin
National team
Years	Team	Apps	(Gls)
1994–2010	Norway	101	(128)

Stian Vatne (born 10 May 1974) is a Norwegian former handball player.

He started his club career in Molde HK, and later played for Stavanger IF in Norway, Kadetten Schaffhausen in Switzerland, Ademar León, Algeciras BM and BM Aragón in Spain and lastly Füchse Berlin in Germany.

He made his debut on the Norwegian national team in 1994, and played 101 matches scoring 128 goals.

In 2013 he received the Håndballstatuetten, the highest handball award in Norway.
