= Kaj Ringlund =

Norwegian handball player

Personal information
- Nationality: Norwegian

Sport
- Sport: Handball
National team
| Years | Team | Apps | (Gls) |
| 1955–1966 | Norway | 31 | (10) |

Kaj Ringlund is a Norwegian handball player.

He made his debut on the Norwegian national team in 1955, and played 31 matches for the national team between 1955 and 1966. He participated at the 1961 World Men's Handball Championship.
