= Pål Bye =

Norwegian handball player (born 1946)

Pål Bye (born 21 May 1946) is a retired Norwegian handball goalkeeper who competed in the 1972 Summer Olympics.

He was born in Oslo and represented the club Oppsal IF. In 1972 he was part of the Norwegian team which finished ninth in the Olympic tournament. He played four matches. In total he was capped 150 times between 1965 and 1980.
