= Erik Vellan =

Norwegian handball player

Personal information
- Nationality: Norwegian

Sport
- Sport: Handball
National team
Years	Team	Apps	(Gls)
1956–1965	Norway	29	(46)

Erik Vellan is a Norwegian handball player.

He made his debut on the Norwegian national team in 1956, and played 29 matches for the national team between 1956 and 1965. He participated at the 1958 World Men's Handball Championship.
