= Jan Petter Aas =

Norwegian handball player

Personal information
- Nationality: Norwegian

Sport
- Sport: Handball
National team
Years	Team	Apps	(Gls)
1959–1964	Norway	7	(3)

Jan Petter Aas is a Norwegian handball player.

He made his debut on the Norwegian national team in 1959, and played 7 matches for the national team between 1959 and 1964. He participated at the 1964 World Men's Handball Championship.
