= Rolf Rustad =

Norwegian handball player (1935–2023)

Personal information
- Nationality: Norwegian
- Born: 12 June 1935
- Died: 23 July 2023 (aged 88)

Sport
- Sport: Handball
National team
Years	Team	Apps	(Gls)
1955–1967	Norway	60	(1)

Rolf Rustad (12 June 1935 – 23 July 2023) was a Norwegian handball player and television editor.

== Handball career ==
Rustad made his debut on the Norway national team in 1955, and played 60 matches for the national team between 1955 and 1967. He participated at the 1958, 1961, 1964, and 1967 World Men's Handball Championship.

Rustad was awarded the Håndballstatuetten trophy from the Norwegian Handball Federation in 1999.

== Broadcasting career ==
Following his handball career, Rustad started working in the Norwegian public broadcaster NRK in 1967 as a television editor for their sports department, and worked there until his retirement.

Rolf Rustad died on 23 July 2023, at the age of 88.
