= Stig Rasch =

Norwegian handball player (born 1967)

Personal information
- Nationality: Norwegian
- Born: 4 July 1967 (age 59) Elverum Municipality, Norway
- Height: 198 cm (78 in)

Sport
- Sport: Handball
- Position: Left back

Youth career
- Years: Team
- 1975–1983: Elverum Håndball

Senior clubs
- Years: Team
- 1983–1986: Elverum Håndball
- 1983–1986: Grasshopper Club Zurich
- 1997–2000: LTV Wuppertal
- 2000–2001: SG Solingen
- 2001–2003: SG Willstätt-Schutterwald
- 2003–2007: Elverum Håndball
National team
Years	Team	Apps	(Gls)
1993–2001	Norway	81	(182)

Stig Rasch (born 4 July 1967) is a Norwegian handball player.

He made his debut on the Norwegian national team in 1993, and played 81 matches for the national team between 1993 and 2001. He competed at the 1999 World Men's Handball Championship in Egypt.
