= Jan Cato Nabseth =

Norwegian handball player

Personal information
- Nationality: Norwegian

Sport
- Sport: Handball

Senior clubs
- Years: Team
- –: Elverum Håndball
National team
Years	Team	Apps	(Gls)
1969–1971	Norway	13	(2)

Jan Cato Nabseth is a Norwegian former handball player. He was known primarily for being a good defensive player.

He made his debut on the Norwegian national team in 1969, and played 13 matches for the national team between 1969 and 1971. He participated at the 1970 World Men's Handball Championship, where Norway finished 13th.

At club level he played for Elverum Håndball.
