= Per Graver =

Norwegian handball player

Personal information
- Nationality: Norwegian
- Born: 1943 (age 82–83)

Sport
- Sport: Handball
- Position: Back
National team
Years	Team	Apps	(Gls)
1964–1970	Norway	50	(188)

Per Graver is a Norwegian former handball player, who was the captain on the Norwegian national team.

He made his debut on the Norwegian national team in 1964, and played 50 matches for the national team between 1964 and 1970. He participated at the 1964, 1967, and 1970 World Men's Handball Championship.

At club level he played for OSI, where he won the NM-Cup four times.

Graver was awarded the Håndballstatuetten trophy from the Norwegian Handball Federation in 2021.
