= Sjur Bø Tollefsen =

Norwegian handball player and manager (born 1969)

Personal information
- Nationality: Norwegian
- Born: 27 March 1969 (age 57) Skien, Norway
- Height: 190 cm (75 in)

Sport
- Sport: Handball
- Position: Back
National team
Years	Team	Apps	(Gls)
1991–1998	Norway	104	(243)

Sjur Bø Tollefsen (born 27 March 1969) is a Norwegian handball player. Sjur was also manager for the Norwegian handball Club Runar Sandefjord.

He made his debut on the Norwegian national team in 1991, and played 104 matches for the national team between 1991 and 1998. He participated at the 1993 and 1997 World Men's Handball Championship.
