= Eivind Ellingsen =

Norwegian handball player

Personal information
- Nationality: Norwegian
- Born: 1976 (age 49–50)

Sport
- Sport: Handball

Senior clubs
- Years: Team
- -1994: Larvik HK
- 1994-2007: Sandefjord TIF
- 2007-2010: Idrettslaget Fram
National team
Years	Team	Apps	(Gls)
2000-2007	Norway	70	(191)

Eivind Ellingsen is a Norwegian former handball player.

He made his debut on the Norwegian national team in 2000, and played 70 matches for the national team between 2000 and 2007. He competed at the 2001 World Men's Handball Championship. At club level he played for Sandefjord TIF, Larvik Håndballklubb and Idrettslaget Fram. He won the Norwegian championship in 1998–99, 2000–01, 2001–02. 2003, 2005 and 2006.
