= Stein Olaf Sando =

Norwegian handball player (born 1968)

Personal information
- Nationality: Norwegian
- Born: April 8, 1968 (age 58)
- Height: 189 cm (74 in)

Sport
- Sport: Handball
- Position: Pivot

Senior clubs
- Years: Team
- –1997: IL Runar Sandefjord
- 1997–2000: HSG Nordhorn
- 2000–2002: VfL Hameln
- 2002–2004: IL Runar Sandefjord
- 2004–2009: Nøtterøy IF
- 2009–2010: IL Runar Sandefjord
National team
Years	Team	Apps	(Gls)
1995–2000	Norway	59	(70)

Stein Olaf Sando (born 1968) is a Norwegian handball player.

He made his debut on the Norwegian national team in 1995, and played 59 matches for the national team between 1995 and 2000. He participated at the 1997 World Men's Handball Championship.
