= Alexander Buchmann =

Norwegian handball player (born 1982)

Alexander Buchmann (born January 24, 1982) is a former Norwegian handball player.

== Biography ==
His last club was US d'Ivry Handball in near the French First League of Handball. He has also played for the Norwegian clubs Astor, Byåsen, Sjetne and Heimdal, German club SG Flensburg-Handewitt, Spanish club BM Altea and Toulouse Union Handball in France.

He played 61 matches and scored 196 goals for the Norwegian Team before he had to quit handball due to an Achilles tendon injury during the world championship in 2009. After he retired as a player he began working with the Norwegian Handball Federation doing analysis.

In 2010 he began working with logistics at Médecins Sans Frontières.

Buchmann married musician Marit Larsen in 2016. They share a daughter named Astrid Ira.
