= John Petter Sando =

Norwegian handball player (born 1961)

Personal information
- Nationality: Norwegian
- Born: 1961 (age 64–65)

Sport
- Sport: Handball

Senior clubs
- Years: Team
- –: Sandefjord Håndboldklub
National team
Years	Team	Apps	(Gls)
1989–1995	Norway	102	(155)

John Petter Sando (born 1961) is a Norwegian handball player.

He made his debut on the Norwegian national team in 1989, and played 102 matches for the national team between 1989 and 1995. He participated at the 1993 World Men's Handball Championship.

His daughter Mie Sophie Sando is also a handball player.
