= Morten Daland =

Norwegian handball player

Personal information
- Nationality: Norwegian

Sport
- Sport: Handball
National team
Years	Team	Apps	(Gls)
1992–1999	Norway	73	(116)

Morten Daland is a Norwegian handball player.

He made his debut on the Norwegian national team in 1992, and played 73 matches for the national team between 1992 and 1999. He competed at the 1999 World Men's Handball Championship.
