= Jan Otto Kvalheim =

Norwegian handball player

Personal information
- Nationality: Norwegian

Sport
- Sport: Handball
National team
Years	Team	Apps	(Gls)
1967–1970	Norway	32	(19)

Jan Otto Kvalheim is a Norwegian handball player.

He made his debut on the Norwegian national team in 1967, and played 32 matches for the national team between 1967 and 1970. He participated at the 1970 World Men's Handball Championship.
