= John Tresse =

Norwegian handball player and coach

Personal information
- Nationality: Norwegian

Sport
- Sport: Handball
National team
Years	Team	Apps	(Gls)
1953–1960	Norway	12	(20)

Teams managed
- Years: Team
- 1961–1965: Norway

John Tresse is a Norwegian handball player and coach.

He made his debut on the Norwegian national team in 1953, and played 12 matches for the national team between 1953 and 1960. He participated at the 1958 World Men's Handball Championship.

Tresse was head coach for the Norway men's national handball team from 1961 to 1965.
