= Morten Haugstvedt =

Norwegian handball player

Personal information
- Nationality: Norwegian

Sport
- Sport: Handball
National team
Years	Team	Apps	(Gls)
1992–1994	Norway	25	(27)

Morten Haugstvedt is a Norwegian handball player.

He made his debut on the Norwegian national team in 1992, and played 25 matches for the national team between 1992 and 1994. He participated at the 1993 World Men's Handball Championship.
