= Niklas Landin Jacobsen =

Danish handball player (born 1988)

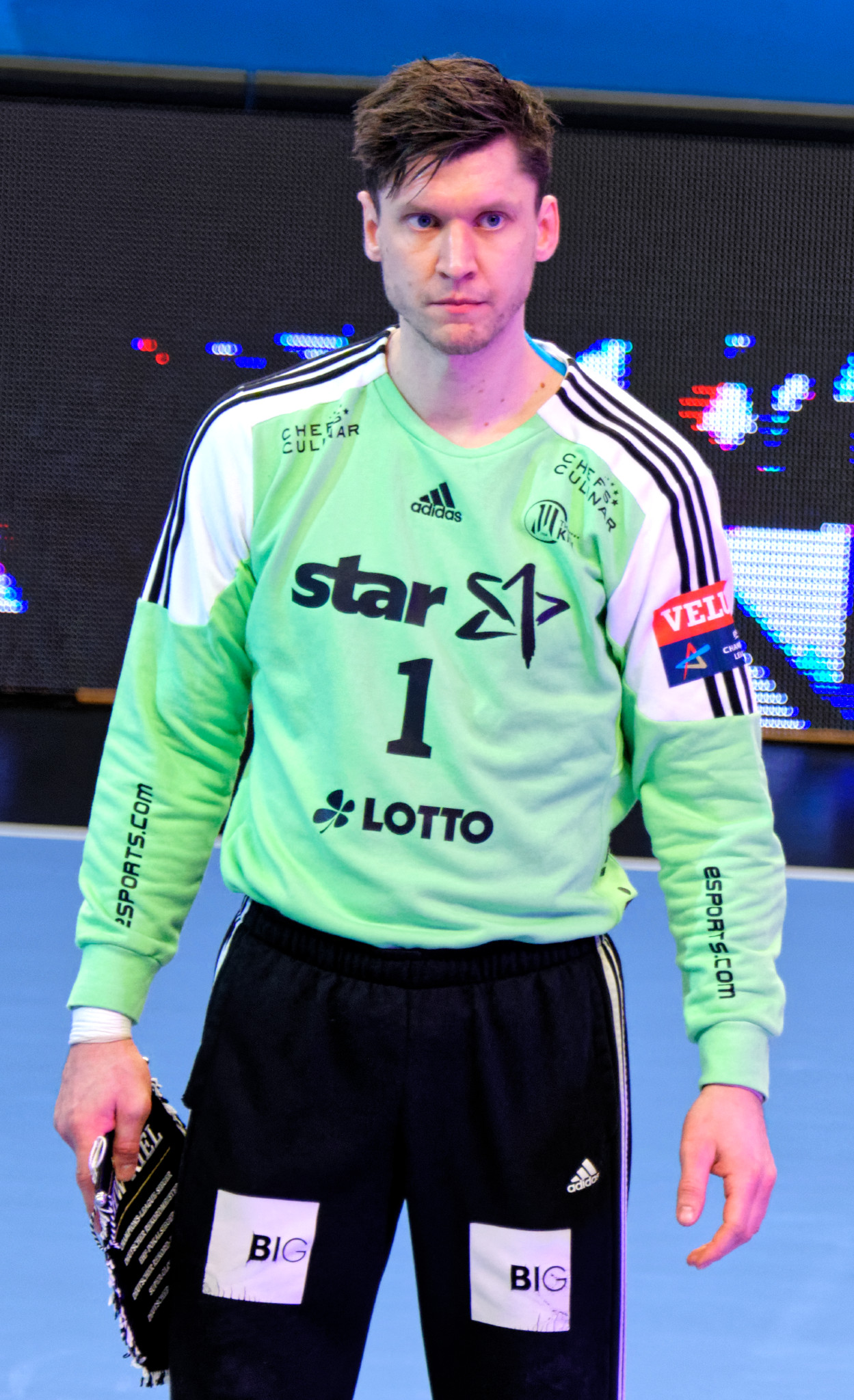
- Landin with THW Kiel in 2018

Personal information
- Nationality: Danish
- Born: 19 December 1988 (age 37) Søborg, Denmark
- Height: 2.01 m (6 ft 7 in)

Sport
- Sport: Handball
- Position: Goalkeeper
- Current club: Aalborg Håndbold
- Number: 1

Youth career
- Years: Team
- 1991–2004: KFUM København
- 2004–2005: GOG
- 2005–2006: KFUM København

Senior clubs
- Years: Team
- 2006–2010: GOG Svendborg TGI
- 2010–2012: Bjerringbro-Silkeborg
- 2012–2015: Rhein-Neckar Löwen
- 2015–2023: THW Kiel
- 2023–: Aalborg Håndbold
National team
Years	Team	Apps	(Gls)
2008–2024	Denmark	283	(13)
Medal record
Olympic Games
Gold medal – first place	2016 Rio de Janeiro	Team
Gold medal – first place	2024 Paris	Team
Silver medal – second place	2020 Tokyo	Team
World Championship
Gold medal – first place	2019 Germany/Denmark
Gold medal – first place	2021 Egypt
Gold medal – first place	2023 Poland/Sweden
Silver medal – second place	2011 Sweden
Silver medal – second place	2013 Spain
European Championship
Gold medal – first place	2012 Serbia
Silver medal – second place	2014 Denmark
Silver medal – second place	2024 Germany
Bronze medal – third place	2022 Hungary/Slovakia
Youth World Championship
Gold medal – first place	2007 Bahrain
Junior World Championship
Silver medal – second place	2009 Egypt
Bronze medal – third place	2007 Macedonia
Junior European Championship
Gold medal – first place	2008 Romania
- Updated on 11 August 2024

Niklas Landin Jacobsen (born 19 December 1988) is a Danish handballer who plays as a goalkeeper for Aalborg Håndbold. Widely regarded as one of the greatest goalkeepers in the history of handball, he is a two-time IHF World Player of the Year (2019 and 2021)—the first player ever to win it consecutively and the only goalkeeper to claim the award twice. He served as captain of the Denmark national team from 2012 until his international retirement in 2024.

He is a European Champion (2012) and helped Denmark win Olympic gold in 2016 and 2024, silver in 2020, and three consecutive World Championships (2019, 2021, 2023). He made his senior international debut on 28 October 2008.

He was the record holder for most carreer goals by goalkeepers in Handball Bundesliga with 19 until early stages of 2025/26 season.

== Club career ==
=== GOG Svendborg TGI ===
In 2006 Landin signed with GOG Svendborg TGI. The club declared bankruptcy early 2010, allowing players to leave.

=== Bjerringbro-Silkeborg ===
He joined Bjerringbro-Silkeborg mid-2010 and stayed until 2012. In the 2010-11 season the team reached to final of the Danish Championship, despite a lackluster 6th place in the regular season. They lost the final to AG København 2–0 in matches. In the following season, they reached the final again, but once again they lost to AG København.

=== Rhein-Neckar Löwen ===
Landin moved to Rhein-Neckar Löwen for the 2012–13 season on a three-year deal and won the 2012–13 EHF Cup.

=== THW Kiel ===
Signed by THW Kiel in August 2014 for the 2015 start, he won the 2015 Super Cup, DHB-Pokal (2017, 2019, 2022), EHF Cup (2019), Bundesliga (2019/20, 2020/21, 2022/23), and EHF Champions League (2020). He was named German Handballer of the Year in 2021. From 2018, his brother Magnus Landin also played for Kiel.

=== Aalborg Håndbold ===
Returned to Denmark in 2023, winning the Danish league in 2024 and 2025, the Danish Cup in 2025, and reaching the 2024 EHF Champions League final (lost 30–31 to Barcelona).

After his retirement from the Danish national team in 2024, he did however announce that he would potentially be ready to be called up for the 2026 European Men's Handball Championship in case of an injury crisis, which ultimately did not occur.

In 2026 he won the Danish cup for a second time and was named tournament MVP. A few later he extended his contract with Aalborg until 2029.

For the 2026–27 season he was named captain of the club, after René Antonsen has left for HBC Nantes.

== Honours ==
- EHF Champions League: Gold 2020; Silver 2024
- EHF Cup: Gold 2013, 2019
- German Championship: Gold 2019/20, 2020/21, 2022/23
- DHB-Pokal: Gold 2017, 2019, 2022
- German Super Cup: Gold 2015
- Danish Championship: Gold 2007, 2024, 2025, 2026; Silver 2011, 2012; Bronze 2010
- Danish Handball Cup: Gold 2025, 2026; Silver 2007, 2008

== Individual awards ==
- IHF World Player of the Year – Men: 2019, 2021
- All-Star Goalkeeper – Olympics: 2016, 2024
- All-Star Goalkeeper – World Championship: 2013, 2019
- All-Star Goalkeeper – European Championship: 2014
- All-Star Goalkeeper – Youth World Championship: 2007
- Danish Player of the Year: 2012, 2014, 2020
- Danish National Team Player of the Year: 2014, 2020, 2021
- Handball-Bundesliga Best Goalkeeper: 2014, 2015, 2017
- All-Star Goalkeeper – EHF Champions League: 2014, 2016, 2020, 2021, 2022
- Handball Player of the Year in Germany: 2021
- EHF Excellence Awards Best Goalkeeper: 2022/23
- Danish Men's Handball Cup MVP: 2025-26

== Personal life ==
Landin is the older brother of Magnus Landin Jacobsen. They have played together on the Danish national team and THW Kiel (2018–2023), and since 2026 they have been reunited in Aalborg Håndbold.
