= Jan Nielsen =

Danish handball player (born 1972)

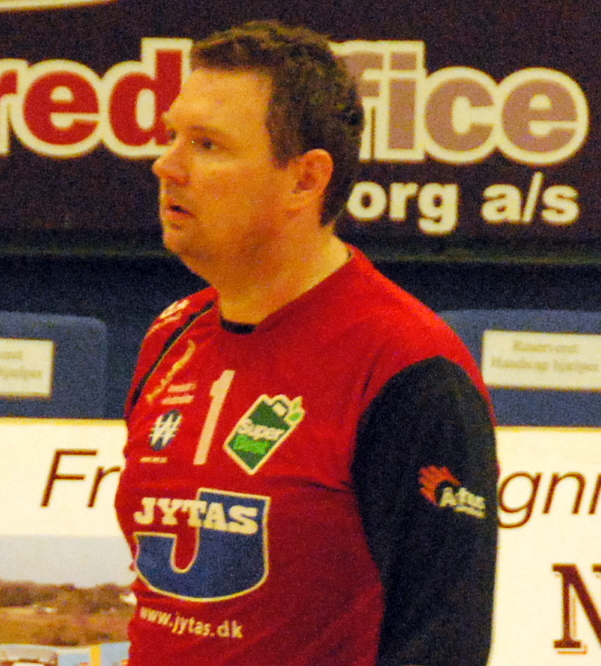
- "Tromle" in September 2011 (photo: Lars Schmidt)

Personal information
- Nationality: Danish
- Born: 1 September 1972 (age 54) Aarhus, Denmark
- Height: 1.92 m (6 ft 4 in)

Sport
- Sport: Handball
- Position: Goalkeeper
- Current club: retired

Senior clubs
- Years: Team
- 1999-2003: Bjerringbro FH
- 2003-2004: Team Tvis Holstebro
- 2004-2005: HF Mors
- 2005–2009: Fredericia HK
- 2009–2016: Århus Håndbold

Jan Nielsen, often called by his nickname "Tromle" (born 1 September 1972) is a Danish former handball player. He won the Danish Men's Handball Cup in 2012. From 2015 to 2018 he was the managing director at the Danish club Århus Håndbold.

== Career ==
In 2003 he transferred from Bjerringbro FH to Team Tvis Holstebro, where he signed a two-year contract. A year later he joined HF Mors, where he played for a year, before joining Fredericia HK.

His time in Fredericia came to an end in 2009, when Århus Håndbold signed both him and his goalkeeper colleague Kasper Kock Larsen.

In 2010 he reached the final of the Danish Cup, where the team lost to AG Håndbold. Despite the loss he was selected as the MVP for the tournament.

In 2012 he would again be in the cup final, and this time he would win it. This was the first time Århus Håndbold won said trophy.

During his time in Århus, he acted as a mentor for the future world cup winner Emil Nielsen, who gradually overtook the role as first choice keeper.

In January 2015 in his last season at the club he was hired as director, making him a player-director at the club. After the 2014-15 he retired as a player at the age of 42. He would however make a comeback for Århus Håndbold in a match against SønderjyskE Håndbold, when Emil Nielsen was injured. In 2016 he unretired for a second time, when Emil Nielsen was out with Meningitis. In his first match of the season he saved an important last-second penalty to tie the match against Aalborg Håndbold.

== Post-playing career ==
After his final retirement he continued as the managing director at Århus Håndbold until 2018. He resigned his position to become the event manager at the Danish Gymnastics and Sports Associations.
