= Buster Juul =

Danish handball player (born 1993)

Personal information
- Full name: Buster Juul Lassen
- Nationality: Danish
- Born: 31 March 1993 (age 33) Slagelse, Denmark
- Height: 1.96 m (6 ft 5 in)

Sport
- Sport: Handball
- Position: Left wing
- Current club: Aalborg Håndbold
- Number: 23

Senior clubs
- Years: Team
- 2010–2013: Skanderborg Håndbold
- 2013–2026: Aalborg Håndbold
- 2026–: Bjerringbro-Silkeborg Håndbold
National team
Years	Team	Apps	(Gls)
2016-	Denmark	3	(7)

Buster Juul (born 31 March 1993) is a Danish handball player for Aalborg Håndbold and the Danish national team.

He made his international debut on the Danish national team in April 2016, against Faroe Islands.

He started his career at Skanderborg Håndbold, and switched to his current club, Aalborg Håndbold, in 2013. Since then he has made more than 400 appearances for the club and has the second most all time appearances for the club only behind René Antonsen.

He is under contract with the club until 2026, and has previously stated publicly that he wanted to continue in the club after his current contract runs out. However, in October 2025 he announced that he will retire after the 2025–26 season. He later reconsidered, and decided to join Bjerringbro-Silkeborg Håndbold on a 2-year contract. In his last season with Aalborg he won the Danish Championship for a 7th time and 3rd time in a row.

== Achievements ==
- EHF Champions League:
  - Runner-up: 2021, 2024
- Håndboldligaen:
  - Winner: 2017, 2019, 2020, 2021, 2024, 2025, 2026
  - Runner-up: 2022, 2023
  - Bronze Medalist: 2014
- Danish Cup:
  - Winner: 2019, 2021, 2025
- Danish Super Cup:
  - Winner: 2019, 2020, 2021
