= Marinus Munk =

Danish handball player (born 2003)

Personal information
- Full name: Marinus Grandahl Munk
- Nationality: Danish
- Born: 22 April 2003 (age 23) Aalborg, Denmark
- Height: 198 cm (78 in)

Sport
- Sport: Handball
- Position: Left back
- Current club: Aalborg Håndbold
- Number: 25

Senior clubs
- Years: Team
- 2023–: Aalborg Håndbold
National team
Years	Team	Apps	(Gls)
2025–	Denmark	4	(8)
- Updated on 3 June 2026

Marinus Grandahl Munk (born 22 April 2003) is a Danish handball player, who plays for Aalborg Håndbold and the Danish national team.

He started in Aalborg Håndbold as a part time player, before turning professional at the age of 20. His breakthrough on the biggest stage came at the age of 19 in an EHF Champions League match against GOG Håndbold, at the age of 19 in 2023, where he scored 6 goals in his international debut.

He debuted for the Danish national team on March 12th, 2025 against France in a 32-33 EHF Euro Cup defeat.

In February 2025 he won the Danish Cup with Aalborg Håndbold, beating Bjerringbro-Silkeborg in the final. Later the same season he won the Danish championship.

In May 2026 he was injured during a match against Sporting and was out for the rest of the season. Aalborg would still go on to win the title without him, beating Skanderborg AGF in the final.
