= Sørenn Rasmussen =

Danish handball player (born 1976)

Søren Rasmussen
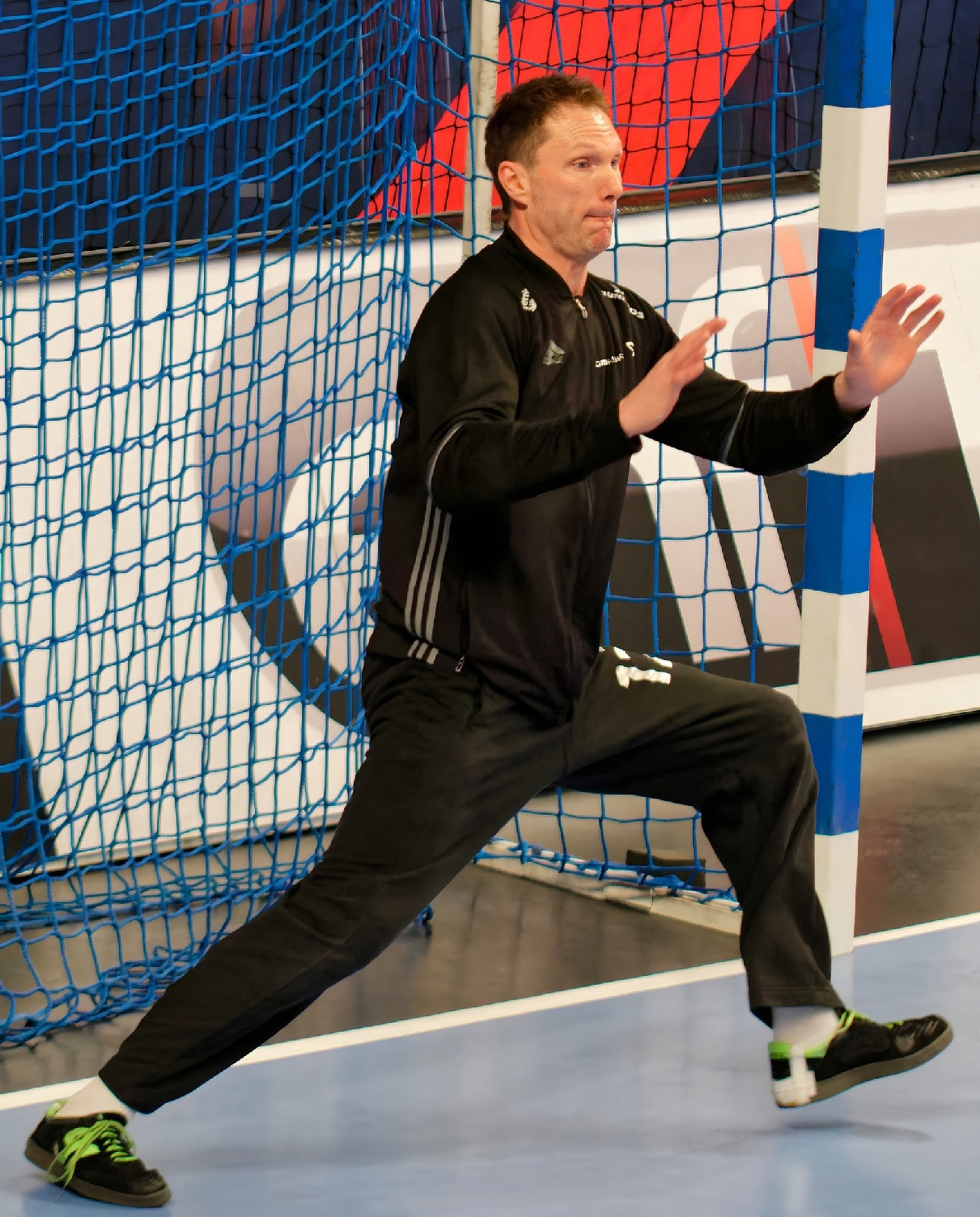

Personal information
- Full name: Søren S. Rasmussen
- Nationality: Danish
- Born: 12 August 1976 (age 50) Balling, Denmark
- Height: 1.93 m (6 ft 4 in)

Sport
- Sport: Handball
- Position: Goalkeeper
- Current club: Ribe-Esbjerg HH
- Number: 12

Senior clubs
- Years: Team
- 1994-1995: Hjorshøj-Egaa
- 1995-1997: Thisted IK
- 1997-2003: Viborg HK
- 2003-2010: Aab Håndbold
- 2010-2014: SG Flensburg-Handewitt (Germany)
- 2014-2018: Bjerringbro-Silkeborg
- 2018-2022: Ribe-Esbjerg HH
National team
Years	Team	Apps	(Gls)
2000-2022	Denmark	41	(0)
Medal record
World Championship
Silver medal – second place	2011 Sweden

Søren Rasmussen (born 12 August 1976) is a Danish former goalkeeper in handball and current goalkeeping coach. He won the 2013–14 EHF Champions League with SG Flensburg-Handewitt.

== Club career ==
Søren Rasmussen started playing handball in Balling Volling Ungdoms- og Idrætsforening and switched to Hjorshøj-Egaa when he became a senior player. In 1997 he signed for Viborg HK, where he won the Danish Men's Handball Cup in 2000.

In 2003 he joined AaB Håndbold, where he was until 2010. In his last season at AaB he won both the Danish Cup and League. The following season he signed for Flensburg-Handewitt who were looking to replace Johan Sjöstrand who had transferred to FC Barcelona Handbol. AaB agreed to the transfer, even though Rasmussen had another year left of his contract. Here he won silver medals in the German Bundesliga twice in 2012 and 2013 and silver medals in the DHB-Pokal four times.

He returned to Danish handball to join Bjerringbro-Silkeborg in 2014, where he won the Danish league for the second time in 2016.

The last club of his playing career was Ribe-Esbjerg HH, where he retired in 2022 at the age of 45. In his last season he won the player of the year award for Ribe-Esbjerg HH.

After his playing career he became a goalkeeping coach at the Danish club TTH Holstebro.

== National team ==
Rasmussen made his debut on the national team in 2000, but it was not until the 2011 World Men's Handball Championship in Sweden, that he played at a major international tournament. The retirement of first choice keeper Kasper Hvidt opened the door for Rasmussens spot. In 2011 he won a silver medal with the Danish national team.

== Honours ==
- Danish Championship:
  - Gold: 2010
  - Gold: 2016
- German Bundesliga
  - Silver: 2012
  - Silver: 2013
- EHF Champions League
  - Gold: 2013–14 EHF Champions League
