= Sander Sagosen =

Norwegian handball player (born 1995)

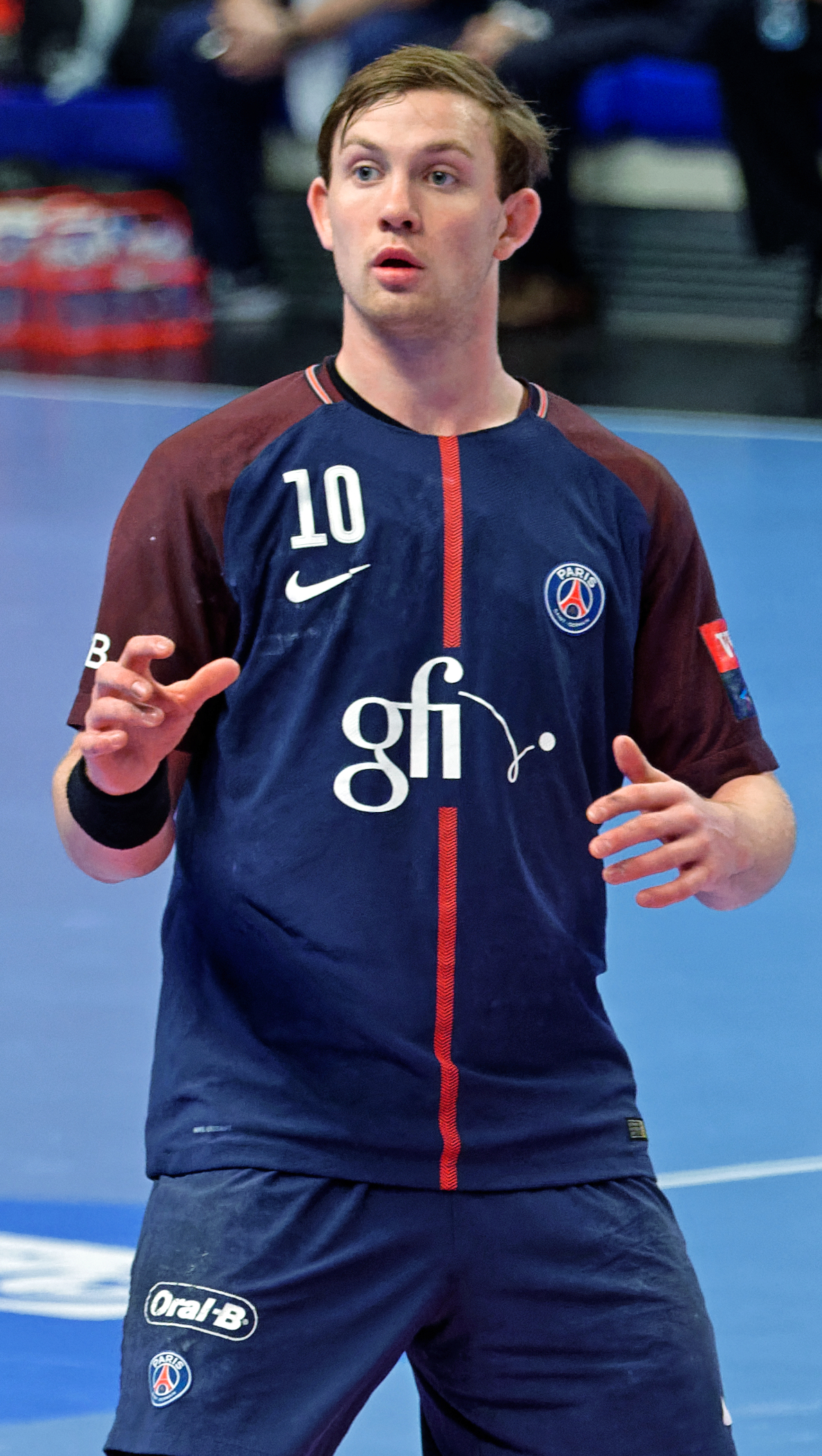
- Sagosen in 2017

Personal information
- Nationality: Norwegian
- Born: 14 September 1995 (age 31) Trondheim, Norway
- Height: 1.95 m (6 ft 5 in)

Sport
- Sport: Handball
- Position: Centre back
- Current club: Aalborg Håndbold
- Number: 5

Youth career
- Years: Team
- –2012: Charlottenlund SK

Senior clubs
- Years: Team
- 2012–2013: Kolstad Håndball
- 2013–2014: Haslum HK
- 2014–2017: Aalborg Håndbold
- 2017–2020: Paris Saint-Germain
- 2020–2023: THW Kiel
- 2023–02/2025: Kolstad Håndball
- 02/2025–: Aalborg Håndbold
National team
| Years | Team | Apps | (Gls) |
| 2013– | Norway | 197 | (956) |
Medal record
World Championship
| Silver medal – second place | 2017 France |
| Silver medal – second place | 2019 Germany/Denmark |
European Championship
| Bronze medal – third place | 2020 Sweden/Austria/Norway |

Sander Sagosen (born 14 September 1995) is a Norwegian professional handball player for Aalborg Håndbold and the Norwegian national team.

He has won major titles in four countries, including league championships in Norway, Denmark, France and Germany. With the national team, Sagosen placed second at the World Championship in 2017 and 2019, and finished third at the 2020 European Championship. Sagosen was included on the All-Star team for five consecutive major international competitions as either best centre back or left back.

== Club career ==
Sagosen started his professional career at Kolstad Håndball in 2012. The following year, he moved to Haslum Håndballklubb. Sagosen joined Danish club Aalborg Håndbold on a three-year contract in 2014. He won the Danish League with the club in 2017. Sagosen has described this period as the best years in his career. Sagosen moved to French club Paris Saint-Germain that same year. Here he won the French championship three years in a row and the French cup as well in 2018.

In 2020, he joined German side THW Kiel. He won the EHF Champions League with the club in 2020. Due to the COVID-19 pandemic, the final and semifinal matches were delayed and played in December 2020. Sagosen scored seven goals in the final against FC Barcelona Handbol.

In 2023, Sagosen returned to Norwegian handball and signed for Kolstad Håndball. He played there until February 2025. Sagosen was signed in an ambition to reach the EHF Champions League. His time there was, however, a mixed bag. He then signed for Danish side Aalborg Håndbold on a four-and-a-half-year contract. He said he wanted to come to Aalborg to be able to focus more on handball.

Just three days after signing for Aalborg, he won the Danish Cup, beating Bjerringbro-Silkeborg in the final. Later the same season, he won the Danish championship.

== International career ==
Sagosen made his debut for the Norwegian national team in 2013 against Croatia during the Bring Cup, at age 18. His first major international tournament was the 2014 European Championship in Denmark. At the 2016 European Championship, Norway placed fourth and Sagosen was awarded a spot on the All-Star team of the tournament as best centre back. He was featured on the All-Star team as best left back for the 2017 World Championship, where Norway finished second.

Sagosen and the national team placed seventh at the 2018 European Championship, where the former was again voted best centre back. At the 2019 World Championship, Norway finished second and Sagosen was included on the All-Star team as best left back for a second time. Norway placed third at the 2020 European Championship, where Sagosen was the top scorer with 65 goals and included on the All-Star team for a fifth consecutive major international tournament. At the same time he broke the record for most goals scored by a single player at any European Championship. At the 2026 European Men's Handball Championship this record was broken by Danish Mathias Gidsel with 68 goals. On 19 March 2026 he scored his 940th goal for Norway, which made him the most scoring player on the Norwegian national team ever.

== Personal life ==
Sagosen is married to former fellow handballer Hanna Oftedal Sagosen. Their first child, Noah, was born on 13 July 2023 and their second child, Emil, was born 17 July 2025.

Sagosen is the older brother of handball player Ciljan Sagosen.

== Major tournament statistics ==
Legend
| Tnmt | Tournament | GP | Games played | Gls | Goals |
| Sh | Shots | G% | Goal percentage | 7G | 7-meter goals |
| 7S | 7-meter shots | As | Assists | AG | Assists and Goals |
| St | Steals | Bl | Blocks | 2M | 2 Minute Suspensions |
| RC | Red Cards | Pl | Placement of National Team | **Bold** | Career high |
| | Led the Tournament | | Tournament MVP | | On All-Star Team |

As of conclusion of 2026 European Men's Handball Championship

| Tnmt | GP | Gls | Sh | G% | 7G | 7S | As | AG | St | Bl | 2M | RC | Pl |
|---|---|---|---|---|---|---|---|---|---|---|---|---|---|
| 2014 EC | 3 | 2 | 6 | 33 | 0 | 0 | 3 | 5 | 0 | 0 | 0 | 0 | 14th |
| 2015 WC | Norway failed to qualify | | | | | | | | | | | | |
| 2016 EC | 8 | 29 | 62 | 47 | 0 | 0 | 40 | 69 | 1 | 2 | 4 | 0 | 4th |
| 2016 OG | Norway failed to qualify | | | | | | | | | | | | |
| 2017 WC | 9 | 41 | 79 | 52 | 8 | 14 | 43 | 84 | 2 | 2 | 3 | 0 | 2nd |
| 2018 EC | 6 | 32 | 54 | 59 | 2 | 4 | 38 | 70 | 1 | 1 | 2 | 0 | 7th |
| 2019 WC | **10** | 51 | 87 | 59 | 8 | 13 | 47 | 98 | 5 | 3 | **3** | 0 | 2nd |
| 2020 EC | 9 | **65** | **104** | 63 | 14 | 19 | **53** | **118** | 3 | 2 | 3 | 0 | 3rd |
| 2021 WC | 7 | 54 | 83 | **65** | **22** | **25** | 38 | 92 | 2 | 2 | 5 | 0 | 6th |
| 2020 OG | 6 | 43 | 81 | 53 | 12 | 18 | 27 | 70 | 1 | 0 | 4 | 0 | 7th |
| 2022 EC | 8 | 43 | 71 | 61 | 6 | 9 | 40 | 83 | 3 | 1 | 5 | 0 | 5th |
| 2023 WC | 9 | 39 | 63 | 62 | 5 | 8 | 49 | 88 | **6** | 2 | **6** | 0 | 6th |
| 2024 EC | 6 | 26 | 51 | 51 | 3 | 4 | 34 | 60 | 0 | 0 | 1 | 0 | 9th |
| 2024 OG | 6 | 15 | 40 | 38 | 0 | 0 | 13 | 28 | 2 | 0 | 3 | **1** | 6th |
| 2025 WC | 4 | 11 | 29 | 38 | 0 | 1 | 16 | 27 | 2 | 0 | 2 | 0 | 10th |
| 2026 EC | 7 | 29 | 66 | 44 | 0 | 0 | 39 | 68 | 1 | 0 | 0 | 0 | 9th |

== Honours ==
=== Club ===
- Norwegian Championship:
  - Gold: 2014, 2023
- Danish Championship:
  - Gold: 2017, 2025, 2026
- Danish Cup
  - Gold: 2025
- French Championship:
  - Gold: 2018, 2019, 2020
- French Cup:
  - Gold: 2018
- French League Cup:
  - Gold: 2018, 2019
- French Super Cup:
  - Gold: 2019
- EHF Champions League:
  - Gold: 2020
- German Championship:
  - Gold: 2021, 2023
- German Super Cup:
  - Gold: 2021, 2022, 2023
- German Cup:
  - Gold: 2022
- Norwegian Cup:
  - Gold: 2023

=== International ===
- World Championship:
  - Silver: 2017, 2019
- European Championship:
  - Bronze: 2020

=== Individual ===
- All-Star Left back of the World Championship: 2017, 2019
- All-Star Left back of the European Championship: 2020
- All-Star Centre back of the European Championship: 2016, 2018
- Top scorer of the European Championship: 2020 (65 goals)
- All-Star Left Back of the EHF Champions League: 2020
- All-Star Centre Back of the EHF Champions League: 2018
- Top Goalscorer of the Danish Handball League: 2017
