= Heino Holm =

Danish handball player (born 1979)

Personal information
- Nationality: Danish
- Born: 28 January 1979 (age 47) Hvidbjerg, Denmark

Sport
- Sport: Handball
- Position: Left back

Youth career
- Years: Team
- –: Thyholm IF
- –: Struer FH

Senior clubs
- Years: Team
- –2005: AAB Håndbold
- 2005–2007: Århus Håndbold
- 2007–2012: Team Tvis Holstebro
- 2012: Viborg HK
- 2013–2015: HC Midtjylland
- 2015–2016: Lemvig-Thyborøn Håndbold
National team
Years	Team	Apps	(Gls)
2002–2004	Denmark	3	(8)

Heino Holm Knudsen (born 28 January 1979) is a Danish former handballer playing left back. He played his entire career in the Danish league system for the top league clubs Viborg HK, Team Tvis Holstebro, Århus GF, AaB Håndbold and lastly the 1st division clubs Lemvig-Thyborøn Håndbold and HC Midtjylland.

== Career ==
Heino Holm started playing handball at the age of 11 in Thyholm IF.

In 2007 he joined Team Tvis Holstebro, where he won the Danish Cup with the club in 2008, and was named MVP for the tournament. In 2012 he transferred to league rivals Viborg HK, where he only played for half a season, before joining the first division club HC Midtjylland. He left Midtjylland after 2.5 seasons, as the clubs could not agree on a new contract. He instead joined Lemvig-Thyborøn Håndbold.

== Post-playing career ==
In 2016 he became a handball coach and math teacher at Lomborg Gymnastik og Idrætsefterskole.
