= Andy Schmid =

Swiss handball player

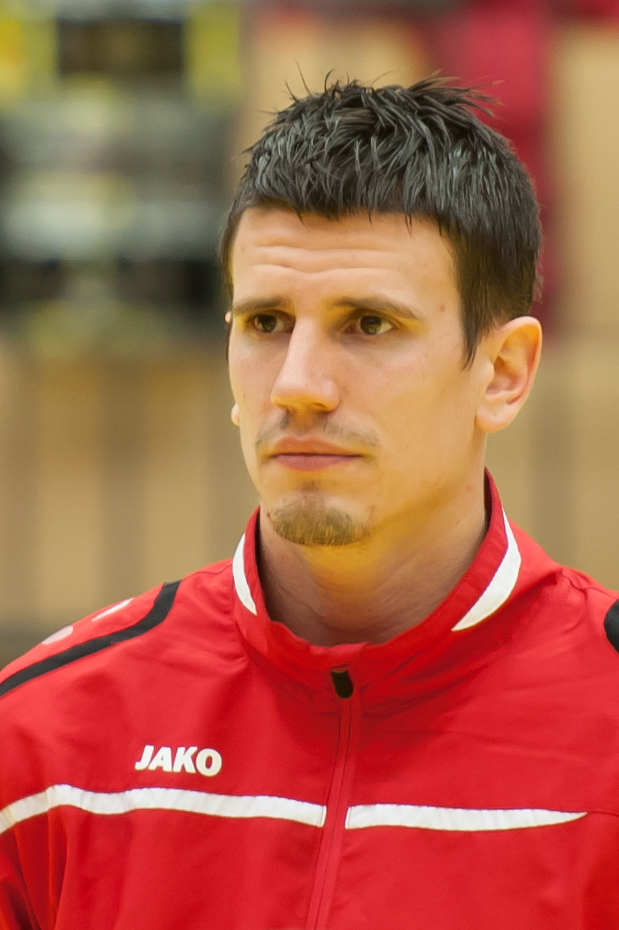

Personal information
- Full name: André Schmid
- Nationality: Swiss
- Born: 30 August 1983 (age 43) Horgen, Switzerland
- Height: 1.89 m (6 ft 2 in)

Sport
- Sport: Handball
- Position: Centre back

Youth career
- Years: Team
- –2002: BSV Borba Luzern

Senior clubs
- Years: Team
- 2002–2004: SG Stans/Luzern
- 2004–2007: Grasshopper Club Zürich
- 2007–2009: ZMC Amicitia Zürich
- 2009–2010: Bjerringbro-Silkeborg
- 2010–2022: Rhein-Neckar Löwen
- 2022–2024: HC Kriens-Luzern
National team
Years	Team	Apps	(Gls)
2003–2024	Switzerland	218	(1094)

Teams managed
- 2024–: Switzerland
- Updated on 16 January 2024

André Schmid (born 30 August 1983) is a Swiss handball coach and former player, who is currently the head coach of the Swiss national team. He retired in February 2024. At the same time he announced that he would be taking over as head coach of the Swiss national team.

He is considered the best Swiss men's player of all time, and one of the best playmakers of his generation. He holds the record for most goals for the Swiss national team, as well as 4th most matches.

He was inducted into the EHF Hall of Fame in 2024.

== Career ==
Schmid started at the youth team of BSV Borba Luzern. From 2002 to 2004 he played for the Nationalliga B team SG Stans/Luzern. In 2004 he joined Grasshopper Club Zürich in the top division, where he played until 2007.

He then joined ZMC Amicitia Zürich, where he won the Swiss Championship twice. In 2009 he joined Danish side Bjerringbro-Silkeborg. In his only season at the club, he won bronze medals.

In March 2010 he announced that he would join German club Rhein-Neckar Löwen for the 2010-11 season on a four year contract. He was a key player for the team, when they won their first title in 2013, the EHF European Cup. In the 2015-16 he was part of the Löwen team, that won their first German Championship. The following season they won the German championship for a second time. In 2018 he also won the DHB-Pokal.

In 2022 he returned to Switzerland and joined HC Kriens-Luzern. In February 2023 he announced that he would retire after the 2023-24 season.

=== National team ===
Schmid made his debut for the Swiss national team on 19 December 2003 in a match against Luxembourg.

In January 2021, at the age of 37, he parcitipated in his first World Championship. The team reached the main round of the tournament, and finished 16th. He had the second most Player-of-the-match awards with 3, only behind Sweden's Andreas Palicka.

At the 2024 European Championship, in the third game in the preliminary round, he scored his goal number 1094 for Switzerland, which made him the most scoring player for Switzerland ever.

== Coaching career ==
After retiring from playing, he became the head coach of the Swiss national team, and signed a contract until 2028.

== Statistics ==
Season	League	Team	Goals	Games	Goals per Game
2004/05	NLA	Grasshopper Club Zürich	84	30	2,8
2005/06	NLA	Grasshopper Club Zürich	118	33	3,6
2006/07	NLA	Grasshopper Club Zürich	144	34	4,2
2007/08	NLA	ZMC Amicitia Zürich	252	32	7,9
2008/09	NLA	ZMC Amicitia Zürich	209	32	6,5
2009/10	JJL	Bjerringbro-Silkeborg	113	24	4,7
2010/11	HBL	Rhein-Neckar Löwen	44	31	1,7
2011/12	HBL	Rhein-Neckar Löwen	84	34	2,5
2012/13	HBL	Rhein-Neckar Löwen	156	34	4,6
2013/14	HBL	Rhein-Neckar Löwen	161	34	4,7
2014/15	HBL	Rhein-Neckar Löwen	114	36	3,2
2015/16	HBL	Rhein-Neckar Löwen	164	32	5,3
2016/17	HBL	Rhein-Neckar Löwen	156	34	4,6
2017/18	HBL	Rhein-Neckar Löwen	189	34	5,6
2018/19	HBL	Rhein-Neckar Löwen	164	34	4,8
2019/20	HBL	Rhein-Neckar Löwen	117	25	4,7
2020/21	HBL	Rhein-Neckar Löwen	167	38	4,4
2021/22	HBL	Rhein-Neckar Löwen	159	34	4,7
2022/23	QHL	HC Kriens-Luzern	259	33	7,8
2023/24	QHL	HC Kriens-Luzern	32	8	4,0

== Achievements ==
- EHF Cup:
  - Winner: 2013
- Swiss Handball League:
  - Winner: 2008, 2009
- Swiss Cup:
  - Winner: 2023
- Handball-Bundesliga:
  - Winner: 2016, 2017
- DHB-Pokal:
  - Winner: 2018
- DHB-Supercup:
  - Winner: 2016, 2017, 2018

== Individual awards ==
- Handball-Bundesliga Player of the Season: 2014, 2015, 2016, 2017, 2018
- Swiss Handball League MVP: 2008, 2009
- All-Star Playmaker of the Danish Handball League: 2010
- Handballer of the Year (Germany): 2017
- EHF Hall of Fame in 2024.
- Swiss Handballer of the year: 2012, 2013, 2014, 2015, 2016, 2017, 2018, 2019, 2020
- Swiss Handball coach of the year: 2025

== See also ==
- List of men's handballers with 1000 or more international goals
