= Stefan Hundstrup =

Danish handball player (born 1986)

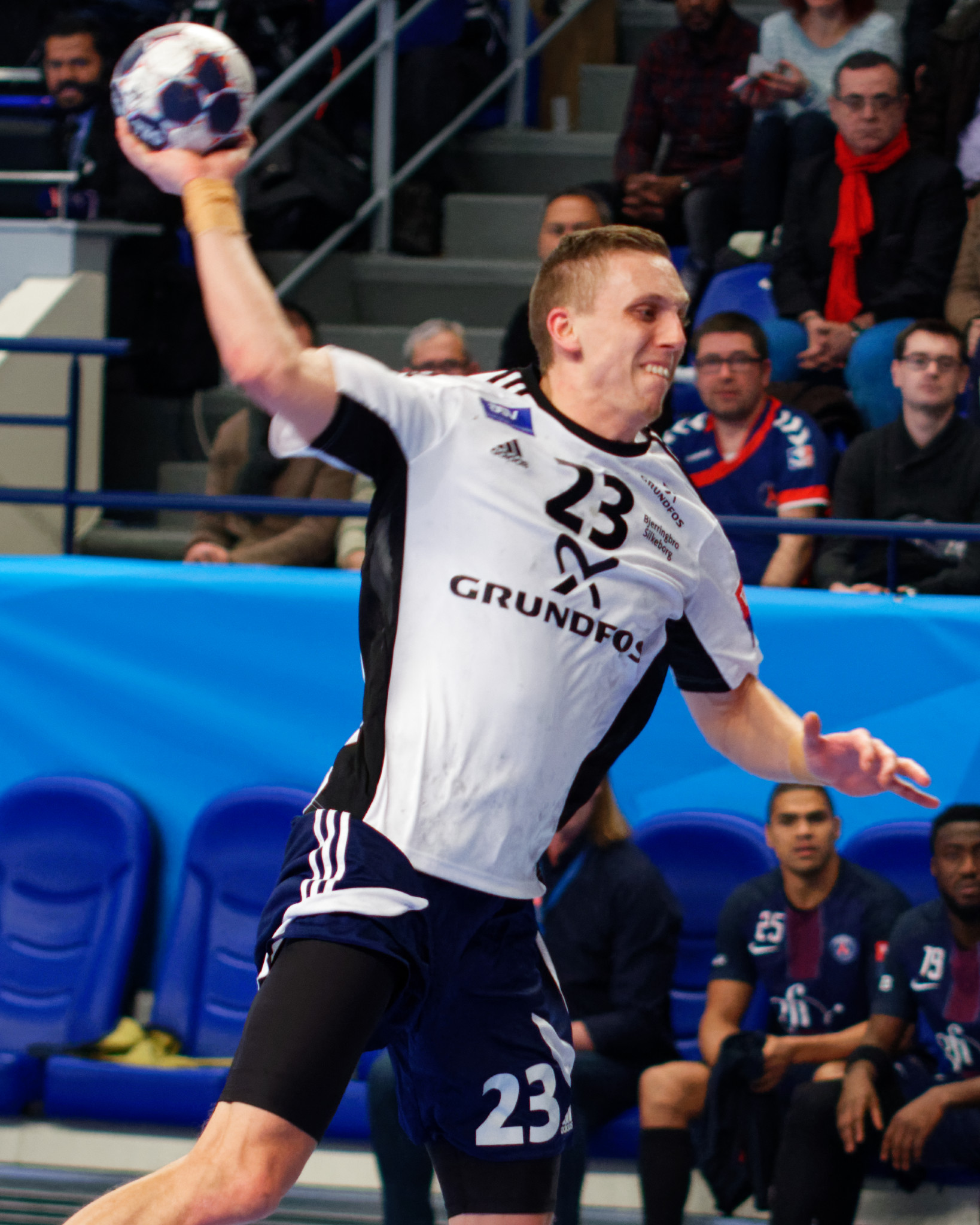

Personal information
- Full name: Stefan Hundstrup
- Nationality: Danish
- Born: 30 June 1986 (age 40) Svendborg, Denmark
- Height: 1.93 m (6 ft 4 in)

Sport
- Sport: Handball
- Position: Left Wing
- Current club: Retired
- Number: 11

Senior clubs
- Years: Team
- –2007: GOG
- 2007–2010: Viborg HK
- 2010–2012: AG København
- 2012–2020: Bjerringbro-Silkeborg
National team
Years	Team	Apps	(Gls)
2009–2015	Denmark	15	(24)

Stefan Hundstrup (born 30 June 1986) is a Danish former handballer, His last club was Danish Handball League side Bjerringbro-Silkeborg. He joined the club from league rivals AG København in 2012.

During his youth career, Hundstrup made several appearances for the Danish national youth handball teams.

He ended his career in March 2020 after problems with his back and spending most of 2019 away from the pitch.
