= Michael Bruun =

Danish handball player (born 1970)

Personal information
- Full name: Michael Bruun Pedersen
- Nationality: Danish (Denmark)
- Born: 8 October 1970 (age 56) Skive, Denmark
- Height: 200 cm (79 in)

Sport
- Sport: Handball
- Position: Goalkeeper
- Current club: Denmark (goalkeeping coach)

Senior clubs
- Years: Team
- –2000: Tvis KFUM
- 2000–2002: Team Tvis Holstebro
- 2002–2005: Bjerringbro FH
- 2005–2011: Team Tvis Holstebro
- 2011–2012: Mors-Thy Håndbold
National team
Years	Team	Apps	(Gls)
1999–2008	Denmark	92	(0)

Teams managed
- 2012–2017: Team Tvis Holstebro (assistant coach)
- 2016–2017: Team Esbjerg (gk coach)
- 2015–2017: Team Tvis Holstebro (gk coach)
- 2018–2020: Randers HK (gk coach)
- 2018–: Denmark (gk coach)
- 2020–2021: Odense Håndbold (gk coach)
- 2021–2024: SG Flensburg-Handewitt (gk coach)
- 2024–: Aalborg Håndbold (gk coach)
Medal record
European Championship
Bronze medal – third place	2002 Sweden

Michael Bruun Pedersen (born 8 October 1970) is a Danish handballer and current handball coach. Bruun has made 92 appearances for the Danish national handball team, most notably participating in the 2002 European Men's Handball Championship, in which he won the bronze medal with the Danish team.

== Playing career ==
He was the goalkeeper of Danish Handball League side Team Tvis Holstebro twice from 2000-2002 and again from 2005-2011. In 2009 he won the Danish Cup with the club. Otherwise he played for Bjerringbro FH between 2002 and 2005 and at Mors-Thy Håndbold in 2011-12. He retired in 2012 at the age of 41.

== Coaching career ==
After his retirement from playing handball, he became the assistant coach at Team Tvis Holstebro where he was until 2017. Since then he has acted as goalkeeping coach for numerous Danish clubs as well as the Denmark Women's national team since 2018.

In 2021 he became the goalkeeping coach of the German club SG Flensburg Handewitt. In the summer 2024 he left Flensburg-Handewitt and became returned to Denmark to become the goalkeeping coach at Aalborg Håndbold.
