= 2008–09 EHF Cup =

Tournament details
- Dates: 6 September 2008 - 17 May 2009
- Teams: 51 (from European Handball Federation confederations)

Final positions
- Champions: (Germany) VfL Gummersbach

Tournament statistics
- Top scorer: (Serbia) Momir Ilic (64 goals)

The 2008–09 EHF Cup season was the 28th edition of the tournament. VfL Gummersbach won the Europe's club handball tournament. HSG Nordhorn were the reigning champions.

== Round 1 ==
Team 1	Agg.	Team 2	1st leg	2nd leg
KRAS/Volendam (Netherlands)	78–55	(Bulgaria) SHK DIU Schumen	37–29	41–26
RK Lovćen (Montenegro)	67–54	(Faroe Islands) Neistin	35–21	32–33
Maccabi Rishon LeZion (Israel)	20*–0	(Georgia (country)) HK Tiflis	10*–0	10*–0

^{*} Cancelled because 2008 South Ossetia war

== Round 2 ==
Team 1	Agg.	Team 2	1st leg	2nd leg
Cyprus Collage	50–57	(Austria) Aon Fivers Margareten	26–27	24–30
Omni SV Hellas (Netherlands)	45–65	(Iceland) Fram Reykjavik	23–32	22–33
HB Dudelange (Luxembourg)	51–54	(Turkey) Maliye Milli Piyango SK	28–27	23–27
KV Sasja HC (Belgium)	43–55	(Israel) Maccabi Rishon LeZion	20–22	23–33
RK Berane (Montenegro)	58–63	(Portugal) Belenenses	36–32	22–31
SKA Minsk (Belarus)	51–57	(Belarus) Meshkov Brest	23–25	28–32
GAS Kilkis (Greece)	34–62	(Serbia) RK Kolubara	23–33	11–29
HRK Izviđač Ljubuški (Bosnia and Herzegovina)	52–55	(Latvia) ASK Riga	23–31	29–24
İzmir Büyükşehir Belediyesi GSK (Turkey)	55–65	(Norway) Elverum Håndball	28–30	27–35
IK Sävehof (Sweden)	59–62	(Italy) PM Conversano	36–30	23–32
KRAS/Volendam (Netherlands)	49–55	(Estonia) Põlva Serviti	27–26	22–29
Lokomotiv Varna (Bulgaria)	47–45	(Italy) PM Casarano	24–27	23–18
HK Portowyk Juschne (Ukraine)	64–45	(Cyprus) Intercollege Nikosia	38–22	26–23
RK Lovćen (Montenegro)	51–50	(Portugal) Benfica	28–26	23–24
Hapoel Rishon LeZion (Israel)	55–61	(Estonia) HC Kehra Tallinn	31–31	24–30
RK Našice (Croatia)	69–54	(Kosovo) KH Prishtina	34–24	35–30

== Round 3 ==
Team 1	Agg.	Team 2	1st leg	2nd leg
DKSE-Airport Debrecen (Hungary)	72–57	(Ukraine) HK Portowyk Juschne	44–33	28–24
RK Našice (Croatia)	51–62	(Spain) BM Aragón	27–29	24–33
RK Kolubara (Serbia)	52–52^{*}	(Spain) JD Arrate	28–31	24–21
Põlva Serviti (Estonia)	53–62	(France) US Ivry HB	27–32	26–30
Elverum Håndball (Norway)	47–61	(France) US Créteil Handball	27–26	20–35
VfL Gummersbach (Germany)	80–56	(Iceland) Fram Reykjavik	38–27	42–29
Gorenje (Slovenia)	68–44	(Montenegro) RK Lovćen	35–16	33–28
HC Kehra Tallinn (Estonia)	49–63	(Germany) SC Magdeburg	24–29	25–34
Loka (Slovenia)	59–56	(Austria) Aon Fivers Margareten	33–29	26–27
Zarja Kaspija Astrakhan (Russia)	60–59	(Belarus) Meshkov Brest	31–23	29–36
TSV St. Otmar St. Gallen (Switzerland)	66–65	(Turkey) Maliye Milli Piyango SK	39–29	27–36
ASK Riga (Latvia)	57–77	(Germany) TBV Lemgo	30–42	27–35
Belenenses (Portugal)	65–55	(Poland) Zagłębie Lubin	35–29	30–26
Bjerringbro-Silkeborg (Denmark)	71–48	(Bulgaria) Lokomotiv Varna	39–26	32–22
PM Conversano (Italy)	56–62	(Denmark) Århus GF	30–39	26–23
Maccabi Rishon LeZion (Israel)	75–63	(Turkey) İzmir Büyükşehir Belediyesi GSK	40–27	35–36

== Round of 16 ==
Team 1	Agg.	Team 2	1st leg	2nd leg
Belenenses (Portugal)	63–80	(Spain) BM Aragón	33–37	30–43
JD Arrate (Spain)	47–46	(Denmark) Århus GF	27–21	20–25
VfL Gummersbach (Germany)	56–44	(Germany) SC Magdeburg	26–24	30–20
Maccabi Rishon LeZion (Israel)	52–56	(Russia) Zarja Kaspija Astrakhan	29–21	23–35
Gorenje (Slovenia)	61–50	(Hungary) DKSE-Airport Debrecen	35–24	26–26
Bjerringbro-Silkeborg (Denmark)	51*–51	(Germany) TBV Lemgo	26–23	25–28
US Ivry HB (France)	52–47	(France) US Créteil Handball	28–19	24–28
TSV St. Otmar St. Gallen (Switzerland)	62–50	(Slovenia) Loka	35–27	27–23

== Quarter-finals ==
The first legs were played on 28–29 March and the second legs were played on 4–5 April.

Team 1	Agg.	Team 2	1st leg	2nd leg
Gorenje (Slovenia)	52–50	(Denmark) Bjerringbro-Silkeborg	27–26	25–24
US d'Ivry (France)	51–74	(Germany) Gummersbach	27–33	24–41
TSV St. Otmar St. Gallen (Switzerland)	60–56	(Russia) Zarja Kaspija Astrakhan	35–31	25–25
Arrate (Spain)	52–58	(Spain) CAI BM Aragón	27–30	25–28

== Semi-finals ==
The first legs were played on 25 April and the second legs on 1–3 May.

Team 1	Agg.	Team 2	1st leg	2nd leg
Gorenje (Slovenia)	52–47	(Switzerland) TSV St. Otmar St. Gallen	27–20	25–27
Gummersbach (Germany)	67–57	(Spain) CAI BM Aragón	39–25	28–32

== Final ==
Team 1	Agg.	Team 2	1st leg	2nd leg
Gorenje (Slovenia)	50–55	(Germany) VfL Gummersbach	28–29	22–26
