= 2004–05 Håndboldligaen (men's handball) =

Danish Handball League
- Season: 2004–05
- Champions: KIF Kolding 10th title
- Relegated: Silkeborg-Voel KFUM, Svendborg TGI
- EHF Champions League: KIF Kolding, Aarhus GF
- Top goalscorer: (Iceland) Robert Gunnarsson (241 goals)

The 2004–05 Danish Handball League season was the 69th edition of the Danish Handball League. GOG Håndbold were the defending champions.

KIF Kolding won the title, when they beat Aarhus Håndbold in the finals. KIF Kolding also won the regular season. Silkeborg-Voel KFUM and Svendborg TGI were relegated.

== League table ==
The regular season was a double round robin. The 4 best teams qualified for the championship playoff, while the last-placed team was relegated. The rest qualified for the relegation playoff.

=== Regular season ===
| | Team | P | W | D | L | G+ | G− | Pts |
|---|---|---|---|---|---|---|---|---|
| 1 | KIF Kolding | 26 | 21 | 1 | 4 | 980 | 807 | 43 |
| 2 | Aarhus GF | 26 | 18 | 3 | 5 | 869 | 803 | 39 |
| 3 | GOG | 26 | 17 | 3 | 6 | 853 | 767 | 37 |
| 4 | Viborg HK | 26 | 16 | 3 | 7 | 814 | 762 | 35 |
| 5 | Skjern Håndbold | 26 | 15 | 2 | 9 | 775 | 728 | 32 |
| 6 | FCK Håndbold | 26 | 13 | 3 | 10 | 780 | 753 | 29 |
| 7 | AAB Håndbold | 26 | 13 | 1 | 12 | 780 | 744 | 27 |
| 8 | Team Tvis Holstebro | 26 | 12 | 0 | 14 | 810 | 808 | 24 |
| 9 | TMS Ringsted | 26 | 9 | 3 | 14 | 680 | 746 | 21 |
| 10 | Fredericia HK | 26 | 9 | 1 | 16 | 726 | 772 | 19 |
| 11 | Elite 3000 | 26 | 7 | 4 | 15 | 758 | 799 | 18 |
| 12 | Bjerringbro FH | 26 | 6 | 2 | 18 | 745 | 814 | 14 |
| 13 | Silkeborg Voel | 26 | 6 | 1 | 19 | 731 | 831 | 13 |
| 14 | Svendborg TGI | 26 | 6 | 1 | 19 | 758 | 925 | 13 |

| Champion Playoff |
| Relegation Playoff |
| Relegation |

=== Championship Round ===
The championship round was played with two semifinals; one between the 1st and 4th placed and one between the 2nd and 3rd placed teams.

== Semifinals ==
| Date | Teams | Result |
|---|---|---|
| 1 May | KIF Kolding – Viborg HK | 36–25 |
| 5 May | Viborg HK – KIF Kolding | 35–37 |

| Date | Teams | Result |
|---|---|---|
| 1 May | Aarhus GF – GOG | 38–37 |
| 5 May | GOG – Aarhus GF | 35–38 |

=== Finals ===
| Date | Teams | Result |
|---|---|---|
| 15 May | KIF Kolding – Aarhus GF | 34–38 |
| 18 May | Aarhus GF – KIF Kolding | 32–37 |
| 25 May | KIF Kolding – Aarhus GF | 31–27 |
