= Jonas Larholm =

Swedish handball player (born 1982)

Personal information
- Full name: Jonas Erik Larholm
- Nationality: Swedish
- Born: 3 June 1982 (age 44) Sävedalen, Gothenburg, Sweden
- Height: 1.93 m (6 ft 4 in)

Sport
- Sport: Handball
- Position: Central back
- Current club: Ribe-Esbjerg HH
- Number: 6

Youth career
- Years: Team
- 1991–2000: IK Sävehof

Senior clubs
- Years: Team
- 2000–2006: IK Sävehof
- 2006–2008: FC Barcelona
- 2008–2012: Aab Håndbold
- 2012–2014: SC Pick Szeged
- 2014–2016: Team Tvis Holstebro
- 2016–2019: IK Sävehof
- 2019-2020: Drammen HK
- 2020-2024: Ribe-Esbjerg HH
National team
Years	Team	Apps	(Gls)
2001–2024	Sweden	210	(637)

Teams managed
- 2019: IK Sävehof player-assistant coach
- 2020-2024: Ribe-Esbjerg HH player-assistant coach
- 2024-: Ribe-Esbjerg HH assistant coach
Medal record
Representing Sweden
Olympic Games
Silver medal – second place	2012 London	Team

Jonas Erik Larholm (born 3 June 1982) is a former handball player, who played for the Swedish national handball team. He retired in 2024 while playing for Ribe-Esbjerg HH. He was part of the Swedish team that won the silver medal at the 2012 Summer Olympics.

== Career ==
Larholm started his career at his hometown club IK Sävehof where he debuted for the senior team in the 2000/2001 season. He won the 2004 and 2005 Swedish Championship and cup. In the 2005 he was the top scorer in the Swedish league, which drew the attention of foreign clubs.

In 2006 he joined FC Barcelona, where he won the Copa del Rey de Balonmano, the Spanish supercup and the Spanish league in his first season.

In 2008 he joined Danish side AaB Håndbold. Here he won the Danish championship in 2010. In the 2010/11 season he was the topscorer in the Danish League.

In 2012 he joined Hungarian side SC Pick Szeged. Here he won the 2013/14 EHF European League. In the final he scored the last crucial goal to 29:27 with 6 seconds to go on a penalty throw.

In 2014 he returned to Denmark to join Team Tvis Holstebro. In 2016 he returned to Sweden and IK Sävehof. Here he won the Swedish championship once again in 2019. At beginning of the 2019/20 season he became the player-coach of the team, but he would not last long in this position, as he left the team in September 2019.

He instead moved to Norway to join Drammen HK in the top Norwegian league. A season later he joined Danish side Ribe-Esbjerg HH as player-assistant coach. He stayed in this position until 2024 where he retired as a player, but continued as the assistant coach. In his last season he had the best penalty throw conversion rate in the Danish league with 92.9%.
