= René Antonsen =

Danish handball player (born 1992)

Personal information
- Full name: René Antonsen
- Nationality: Danish
- Born: 31 March 1992 (age 34) Aalestrup, Denmark
- Height: 1.95 m (6 ft 5 in)

Sport
- Sport: Handball
- Position: Pivot
- Current club: Aalborg Håndbold
- Number: 22

Youth career
- Years: Team
- –: Aalestrup IF
- –: Aalborg KFUM

Senior clubs
- Years: Team
- 2011–2013: Aalborg Håndbold
- 2013–2015: Ribe-Esbjerg HH
- 2015–2026: Aalborg Håndbold
- 2026–: HBC Nantes
National team
Years	Team	Apps	(Gls)
2019–	Denmark	7	(6)
Medal record
European Championship
Bronze medal – third place	2022 Hungary/Slovakia
- Updated on 13 March 2025

René Antonsen (born 4 March 1992) is a Danish handball player for Aalborg Håndbold.

He made his international debut on the Danish national team on 12 June 2019, against Ukraine. His first and to date only major international tournament was the 2022 European Men's Handball Championship, where he played two games and scored two goals. He won a bronze medal with the Danish team.

He played most of his senior career at Aalborg Håndbold where he is the team captain and has the club record for most all time appearances. Here he won the Danish handball league in 2013, 2017, 2019, 2020, 2021, 2024, and 2025. He also won the 2018, 2021 and 2025 Danish Men's Handball Cup.

He started playing handball at Aalestrup IF. In 2011 he joined Aalborg Håndbold. Between 2013 and 2015 he played for Ribe-Esbjerg HH.

== Achievements ==
- EHF Champions League:
  - Runner-up: 2021, 2024
- Håndboldligaen:
  - Winner: 2013, 2017, 2019, 2020, 2021, 2024, 2025, 2026
  - Runner-up: 2022, 2023
- Danish Cup:
  - Winner: 2018, 2021, 2025
- Danish Super Cup:
  - Winner: 2019, 2020, 2021
