= Sebastian Frandsen =

Danish handballer (born 1994)

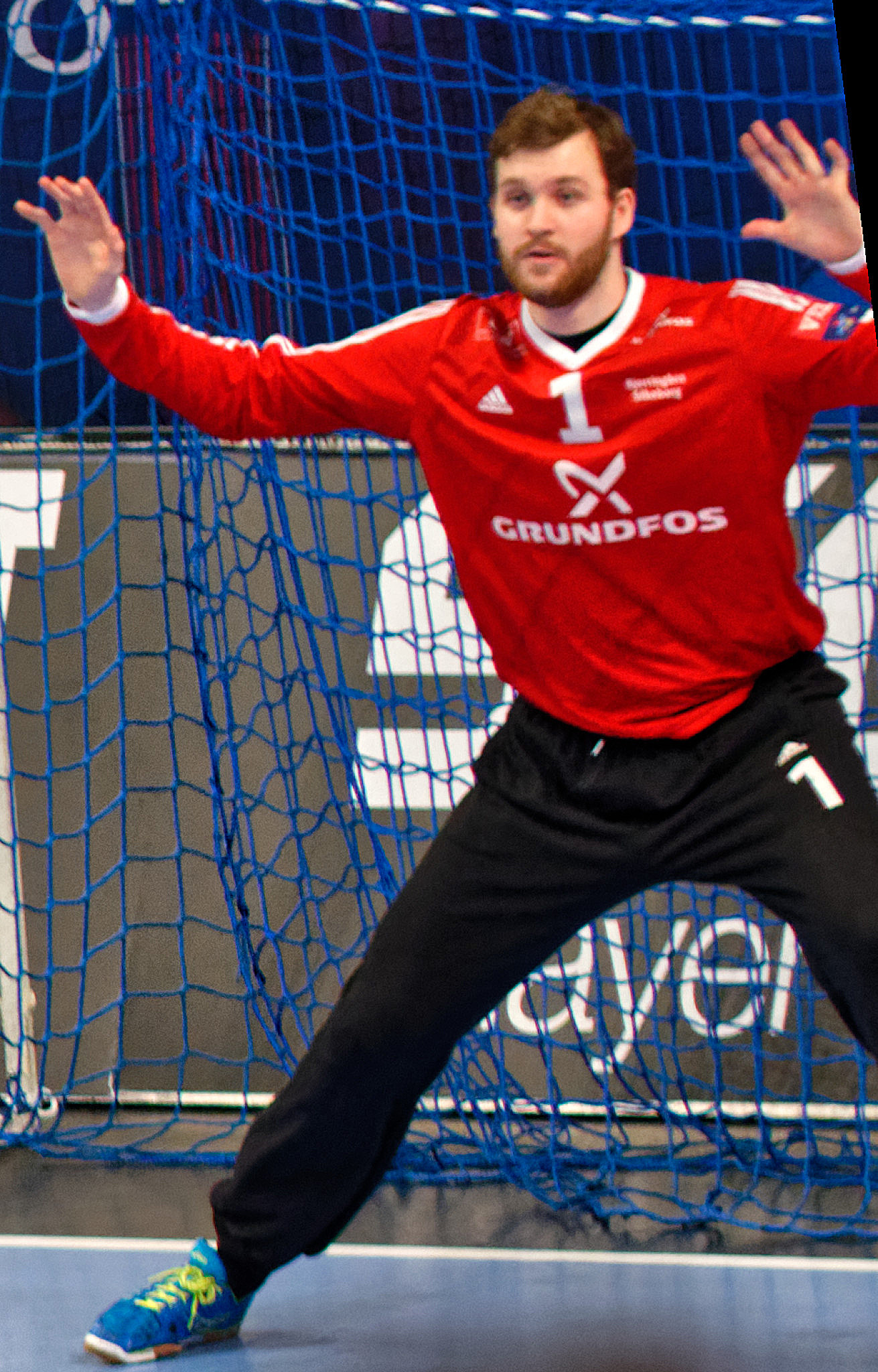

Personal information
- Nationality: Danish
- Born: 24 May 1994 (age 32) Aarhus, Denmark
- Height: 2.04 m (6 ft 8 in)

Sport
- Sport: Handball
- Position: Goalkeeper
- Current club: Fredericia HK
- Number: 1

Senior clubs
- Years: Team
- –2014: Vejle Håndbold
- 2014–2016: Ribe-Esbjerg HH
- 2016–2018: Bjerringbro-Silkeborg
- 2018–2021: TTH Holstebro
- 2021–2023: FC Porto
- 2023–: Fredericia HK
National team
Years	Team	Apps	(Gls)
2015–	Denmark	6	(1)
Medal record
Representing Denmark
Youth World Championship
Gold medal – first place	2013 Hungary	Team

Sebastian Leth Frandsen (born 24 May 1994) is a Danish handball player who plays for Fredericia HK.

He won the 2013 Men's Youth World Handball Championship along the Danish youth national team, defeating Croatia 32–26 in OT.

== Club career ==
=== Ribe-Esbjerg HH ===
He joined Ribe-Esbjerg HH on a two-year contract, starting at the begin of the 2014–15 season after being without a club due to Vejle Håndbold bankruptcy. While playing for Ribe-Esbjerg he debuted for the Danish national team on November 6th 2015 against Spain.

=== Bjerringbro-Silkeborg ===
Bjerringbro-Silkeborg announced on 26 September 2015 that Sebastian Frandsen would be joining the club at the start of the 2016/2017 season. Frandsen signed a three-year deal with the club.

=== TTH Holstebro ===
TTH Holstebro announced on 18 October 2017 that Sebastian Frandsen would be joining the club at the start of the 2018/2019 season. Frandsen signed a three-year deal with the club.

=== FC Porto ===
Frandsen played for FC Porto Handball for 2 years, where he won the Portoguese league and played in the EHF Champions League.

=== Fredericia HK ===
For the 2023–24 season Frandsen returned to Denmark to play for Fredericia HK.

== Individual awards ==
- All-Star Goalkeeper of the Youth World Championship: 2013
- Male Talent of the year: 2015
