= Charlottenlund SK =

Norwegian sports club

Charlottenlund
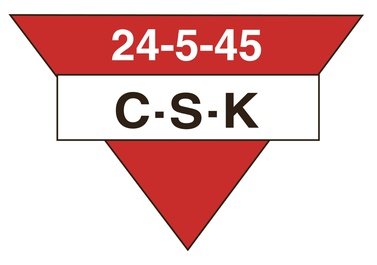
- Full name: Charlottenlund Sportsklubb
- Short name: CSK
- Founded: 24 May 1945; 81 years ago
- Arena: CSK Øvre Rotvoll Arena, Trondheim
- Chairman: Heidi Linge (main board) / Monica Sagosen (handball)
- Head coach: Bendik Dalen (men) / Roger Kvannli (women)
- League: 1. divisjon (men) / 2. divisjon (women)
Home	Away
- Website csk.noOfficial site

Charlottenlund Sportsklubb (CSK) is a multi-sport club from the Charlottenlund district of Trondheim, Norway, founded on 24 May 1945. The club has sections for handball, football and innebandy. Its senior men's team plays in the 1. divisjon, the second tier of Norwegian handball.

== Handball ==
Charlottenlund Sportsklubb offers "a full handball programme for all age groups and genders", with the handball department numbering around 630 members (2026). The club's home arena for handball is CSK Øvre Rotvoll Arena.

=== Men ===
The men's team played in the 1. divisjon in the 2025–26 season under coach Bendik Dalen, finishing 4th. The team has played in the 1. divisjon continuously since the 2015–16 season.

Charlottenlund previously had a cooperation agreement with Kolstad Håndball, Trondheim's top-division club, under which Kolstad could call up up to three named players from the Charlottenlund squad. The agreement was terminated in 2025 after the Norwegian Handball Federation introduced rules barring an Eliteserien club from having a partner club in the 1. divisjon.

Charlottenlund's U20 team reached three consecutive Norwegian junior championship finals: silver in 2022 after a 31–33 loss to Melhus, gold in 2023 after a 32–29 win over Nærbø, and gold in February 2024 after a 29–25 win over Haslum.

=== Women ===
The women's team played in the Eliteserien (top division) in 1995. The current women's team, coached by Roger Kvannli, plays in the 2. divisjon following promotion ahead of the 2026–27 season.

=== Notable players ===
Sander Sagosen, one of Norway's most decorated handball players, played for Charlottenlund until 2012 before moving on to Kolstad and later clubs including Paris Saint-Germain, THW Kiel and Aalborg Håndbold. His younger brother Ciljan Sagosen also played youth handball at Charlottenlund and was part of the club's senior team in the 1. divisjon from 2023 to 2025, including the squad that won the national junior championship in 2024, before moving on to Bergen Håndball and Bjerringbro-Silkeborg Håndbold.

Goalkeeper Henrik Ibsen, named man of the match in the 2024 national junior final, also played Eliteserien matches for Kolstad as part of the clubs' cooperation, before moving on to Bergen Håndball and later Elverum Håndball.

Simen Lyse played for Charlottenlund before moving on to Kolstad, where he stayed for seven seasons and won the domestic treble in 2022–23, before joining Paris Saint-Germain Handball in 2026. Lyse made his debut for the Norwegian national team in 2023 and has since played at the European Championship, World Championship and Olympics for Norway.

Christian Berge, a former national team player and head coach of the Norwegian men's national team (world championship silver in 2017 and 2019, European Championship bronze in 2020) and current head coach of Kolstad Håndball, began his handball career at Charlottenlund. Stian Gomo Nilsen played as a goalkeeper for Charlottenlund's youth programme from age 17, and later coached several of the club's youth teams — including Sander Sagosen's age group — before becoming head coach of Kolstad Håndball.

=== Youth ===
CSK fields teams in age-group handball classes; in the 2025–26 season both the girls' and boys' U18 teams reached the play-offs of the national league (Landsserien).

== Football ==
At senior level, the men's team plays in the fifth and sixth tiers of Norwegian football. In 2009 Charlottenlund won its division and played a promotion play-off for the Second Division, losing 7–2 on aggregate to Kolstad. In 2016 the club reached the first round of the Norwegian Football Cup for the first time in seven years.

== History ==
Charlottenlund Sportsklubb was re-established on 24 May 1945, growing out of Charlottenlund AIL (founded 1921), by John Aune, Erling Olsen, Albert Eggen, Oskar Olsen and Aksel Lernæs. It is a district club whose members come mainly from the Charlottenlund and Brundalen school catchment areas, and has over the years made its mark particularly in football and handball, both locally, regionally and nationally. The club's motto is "Sammen skaper vi sportsglede og utvikling – for alle" ("Together we create sporting enjoyment and development – for everyone").
