= Danish Super Cup (handball) =

Handball tournament in Denmark

The Danish Super Cup is a tournament, in the format of a Supercup, played in both women's and men's handball. The tournament is arranged by Divisionsforeningen which also organises the Danish handball leagues. It was held the first time in 2011.

In the tournament, the winner of last season's Danish Men's Handball Cup or Danish Women's Handball Cup meets the winner of the Danish Men's Handball League or Danish Women's Handball League. If a team has won both the cup and the league, the runner-up of the league final plays in the Super Cup.

== Results ==
Season	Gender	Venue	Location	Date	League winner	Cup winner	Result
2011	men's tournament	Brøndbyhallen	Brøndby	23 August	AG København	Århus Håndbold (Note: lost the cup final to AG København)	30-27
2011	women's tournament	Ikast-Brande Arena	Ikast	24 August	FCM Håndbold	Viborg HK	28-33
2012	men's tournament	Gigantium	Aalborg	28 August	Bjerringbro-Silkeborg (Note: Qualified after AG København declared bankruptcy)	Aalborg Håndbold (Note: lost the cup final to AG København)	19-25
2012	women's tournament	Arena Midt	Kjellerup	29 August	Randers HK	Viborg HK	29-24
2013	men's tournament	Gigantium	Aalborg	23 August	Aalborg Håndbold	Aarhus Håndbold	27-28
2013	women's tournament	Ikast-Brande Arena	Ikast	27 August	FCM Håndbold	Team Tvis Holstebro (Note: lost to FC Midtjylland Håndbold in both the Cup semifinals and the league final)	30-24
2014	men's tournament	Gigantium	Aalborg	22 August	KIF Kolding København	Aalborg Håndbold (Note: lost both the league finals and cup final to KIF Kolding København)	17-16
2014	women's tournament	Gigantium	Aalborg	22 August	Viborg HK	FCM Håndbold (Note: lost both the league finals and cup final to Viborg HK)	19-25
2015	men's tournament	Skjern Bank Arena	Skjern	20 August	KIF Kolding København	Skjern Håndbold	23-22
2015	women's tournament	Skjern Bank Arena	Skjern	20 August	FC Midtjylland Håndbold	Team Esbjerg (Note: lost both the league finals and cup final to FCM)	19-27
2016	men's tournament	Spektrum	Vejle	6 September	Bjerringbro-Silkeborg	HC Midtjylland	29-27
2016	women's tournament	Spektrum	Vejle	6 September	Team Esbjerg	FC Midtjylland Håndbold	21-29
2017	men's tournament	Roskilde Kongres- & Idrætscenter	Roskilde	29 August	Aalborg Håndbold	Skjern Håndbold	17-27
2017	women's tournament	Roskilde Kongres- & Idrætscenter	Roskilde	29 August	Nykøbing Falster Håndboldklub	Randers HK	30-23
2018	men's tournament	Fælledhallen	Skanderborg	26 August	Skjern Håndbold	TTH Holstebro	23-26
2018	women's tournament	Fælledhallen	Skanderborg	26 August	København Håndbold	Team Esbjerg	30-26
2019	men's tournament	Næstved Arena	Næstved	27 August	Aalborg Håndbold	GOG Håndbold	30-25
2019	Super Cup 2019 - Women's tournament	Næstved Arena	Næstved	27 August	Team Esbjerg	Nykøbing Falster HK	33-22
2020	men's tournament	Gigantum	Aalborg	1 September	Aalborg Håndbold	GOG Håndbold	37-31
2020	women's tournament	Gigantum	Aalborg	1 September	Cancelled due to COVID-19		
2021	men's tournament	Vibocold Arena	Viborg	25 August	Aalborg Håndbold	Mors-Thy Håndbold	33-25
2021	women's tournament	Vibocold Arena	Viborg	25 August	Odense Håndbold	Viborg HK (Note: lost league finals to Odense Håndbold)	35-36
2022	men's tournament	Gigantium	Aalborg	23 August	GOG Håndbold	Aalborg Håndbold	31-36
2022	women's tournament	Gigantium	Aalborg	23 August	Odense Håndbold	Team Esbjerg	25-36
2023	men's tournament	Arena Randers	Randers	30 August	GOG Håndbold	Aalborg Håndbold (Note: lost league finals to GOG.)	34-32
2023	women's tournament	Arena Randers	Randers	30 August	Team Esbjerg	Odense Håndbold (Note: lost league finals to Team Esbjerg)	25-30
2024	men's tournament	Arena Randers	Randers	28 August	Aalborg Håndbold	GOG Håndbold	29-28
2024	women's tournament	Arena Randers	Randers	28 August	Team Esbjerg	NFH (Note: lost both cup and league finals to Team Esbjerg)	26-23
2025	men's tournament	Arena Randers	Randers	24 August	Aalborg Håndbold	Skjern Håndbold	35-29
2025	women's tournament	Arena Randers	Randers	24 August	Odense Håndbold	Team Esbjerg (Note: lost league finals to Odense Håndbold)	33-30
2026	men's tournament	Arena Randers	Randers	23 August	Aalborg Håndbold	Skanderborg Aarhus (Note: lost league finals to Aalborg Håndbold)	31-28
2026	women's tournament	Arena Randers	Randers	23 August	Team Esbjerg	Odense Håndbold	33-25

== Number of titles ==
Men
Club	No. of titles
Aalborg Håndbold	8
KIF Kolding (Note: Including KIF Kolding København)	2
GOG Håndbold (Note: Including all former names)	1
TTH Holstebro	1
AG København	1
Bjerringbro-Silkeborg	1
Skjern Håndbold	1
Aarhus Håndbold	1

Women
Club	No. of titles
Team Esbjerg	5
Ikast Håndbold (Note: Including FCM Håndbold and Herning-Ikast Håndbold)	3
Viborg HK	2
Odense Håndbold	2
København Håndbold	1
Nykøbing Falster Håndboldklub	1
Randers HK	1
