= Ciljan Sagosen =

Norwegian handball player (born 2007)

Personal information
- Nationality: Norwegian
- Born: 13 December 2007 (age 18) Trondheim, Norway
- Height: 1.82 m (6 ft 0 in)

Sport
- Sport: Handball
- Position: Centre back
- Current club: Bjerringbro-Silkeborg Håndbold
- Number: 17

Youth career
- Years: Team
- –2023: Charlottenlund SK

Senior clubs
- Years: Team
- 2023–2025: Charlottenlund SK
- 2025–2026: Bergen Håndball
- 2026–: Bjerringbro-Silkeborg Håndbold
National team
Years	Team	Apps	(Gls)
2026–	Norway	1	(1)

Ciljan Sagosen (born 13 December 2007) is a Norwegian handball player for Bjerringbro-Silkeborg Håndbold.

On 16 May 2026, he got his debut for the Norwegian national team against Turkey, at age 18.

== Club career ==
Sagosen started his career at Charlottenlund playing in the 1. division before joining Bergen Håndball in REMA 1000-ligaen in 2025. In the summer of 2026 he joined Danish team Bjerringbro-Silkeborg Håndbold.

== International career ==
Sagosen represented Norway at the 2025 IHF Men's U19 Handball World Championship, placing 8th.

== Personal life ==
Sagosen is the younger brother of international handball star Sander Sagosen.

== Achievements ==
- REMA 1000-ligaen:
  - Bronze: 2025/26
- Norwegian Men's Junior Handball Cup:
  - Gold: 2023/24

== Individual awards ==
- Best Rookie of REMA 1000-ligaen: 2025/2026
