= Klaus Thomsen =

Danish handball player (born 1986)

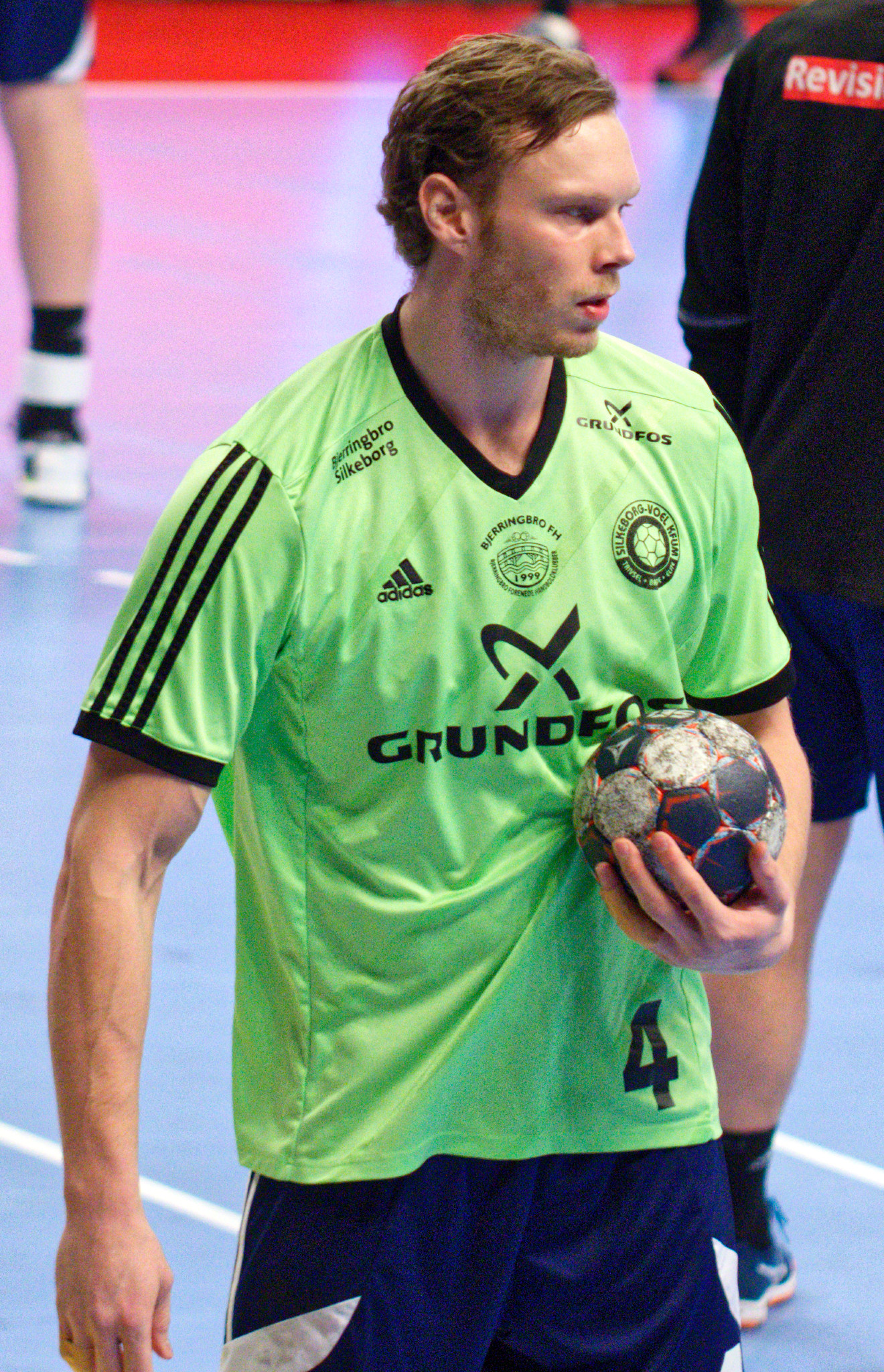

Personal information
- Nationality: Danish
- Born: 26 April 1986 (age 40) Haderslev, Denmark
- Height: 1.98 m (6 ft 6 in)

Sport
- Sport: Handball
- Position: Left back
- Current club: Bjerringbro-Silkeborg
- Number: 4

Senior clubs
- Years: Team
- 2004–2007: Viborg HK
- 2007–2012: Lemvig-Thyborøn Håndbold
- 2012–2014: Team Tvis Holstebro
- 2014–2021: Bjerringbro-Silkeborg
National team
Years	Team	Apps	(Gls)
2013–2021	Denmark	20	(4)
Medal record
European Championship
Silver medal – second place	2014 Denmark	Team

Klaus Thomsen (born 26 April 1986) is a Danish former handball player. He played his entire career in Denmark, and for a while he featured in the Danish national team.

== Career ==
Klaus Thomsen's first stations as a handball player were Næssets IF and Team Haderslev.
In the summer of 2004, he joined the backcourt Viborg HK on. He was initially injured again, after which he joined the second division side Lemvig-Thyborøn Håndbold. In 2009, Lemvig rose to the highest Danish league. After Lemvig 2012 had to go to the gear in the second division, changed the defense specialist to Team Tvis Holstebro. With Team Tvis Holstebro he was in the final four of the EHF Europa Cup 2012/13. In addition to his playing career, he worked as a coach of a youth team of Tvis KFUM and at the Elitesport Academy in Holstebro.

From the season 2014/15 until 2022 he was at Bjerringbro-Silkeborg. With Bjerringbro-Silkeborg he won the 2016 Danish championship.

Klaus Thomsen made his debut on 5 April 2013 in the Danish national team. Previously, he already played for the B national team. At the European Championship 2014 in his own country, he was Vice-European champion.

He retired from handball in 2021.

== Honours ==
- Danish Championship:
  - Gold: 2016
