= 2010–11 Herrehåndboldligaen =

Jack&Jones Ligaen
- Season: 2010–11
- Champions: AG København
- Relegated: Frederiksberg IF; Fredericia HK
- EHF Champions League: AG København, Bjerringbro-Silkeborg
- EHF Cup: Nordsjælland, Skjern Håndbold
- Top goalscorer: (Sweden) Jonas Larholm, AaB (160 goals)

The 2010–11 Danish Handball League season, officially known as Jack & Jones Ligaen for sponsorship reasons, was the 75th edition of the Danish Handball League. AaB Håndbold were the defending champions.

AG København won the title, when they beat Bjerringbro-Silkeborg in the final 2–0 in matches. This was the first national championship for AG København. Frederiksberg IF were relegated when they finished last in the regular season. Fredericia HK were later relegated, when they finished 9th in the regular season and lost the relegation play-off.

== League table ==
The regular season was a double round robin. The 8 best teams qualified for the championship playoff, while the last place was relegated. The rest qualified for the relegation playoff.

=== Regular season ===
	Team	P	W	D	L	G+	G−	Diff.	Pts
1	AG København	26	24	2	0	847	633	+214	50
2	Skjern Håndbold	26	16	4	6	762	700	+62	36
3	Aarhus Håndbold	26	16	3	7	748	708	+40	35
4	Nordsjælland Håndbold	26	16	3	7	773	710	+63	35
5	AaB Håndbold	26	15	4	9	845	767	+78	34
6	Bjerringbro-Silkeborg	26	16	1	9	750	658	+92	33
7	KIF Kolding	26	13	5	8	828	774	-54	31
8	Team Tvis Holstebro	26	15	1	10	754	764	-10	31
9	Fredericia HK	26	8	3	15	671	740	-69	19
10	Lemvig-Thyborøn	26	8	3	15	625	710	-85	18
11	Viborg HK	26	6	2	18	686	772	-86	14
12	Mors-Thy	26	6	1	19	773	888	-115	13
13	HC Midtjylland	26	3	4	19	702	824	-122	10
14	FIF	26	2	1	23	593	709	-116	5

Champion Playoff
Relegation Playoff
Relegation

=== Championship Round ===
The championship round was played in two groups of four. The winner of each group advanced to the championship finals. The second place advanced to the third place playoff.

==== Group 1 ====
	Team	P	W	D	L	G+	G−	Diff.	Pts
1	AG København	6	5	0	1	162	148	+14	12
2	Nordsjælland	6	3	0	3	157	167	-10	7
3	AaB	6	3	0	3	163	161	+2	6
4	TTH	6	1	0	5	162	168	-6	2

==== Group 2 ====
	Team	P	W	D	L	G+	G−	Diff.	Pts
1	Bjerringbro-Silkeborg	6	6	0	0	186	157	+29	12
2	Skjern Håndbold	6	3	0	3	158	160	-2	8
3	KIF Kolding	6	2	0	4	167	179	-12	4
4	Aarhus GF	6	1	0	5	174	189	-15	3

Championship Playoff
3rd Place

=== 3rd Place ===
Date	Time	Teams	Result	Half Time Res.	Venue
13 May	19:10	Skjern Håndbold – Nordsjælland Håndbold	29–28	12–18	Skjern Bank Arena, Skjern
18 May	19:00	Nordsjælland Håndbold – Skjern Håndbold	27–24	13–14	Helsingehallerne, Helsinge
24 May	19:00	Skjern Håndbold – Nordsjælland Håndbold	25–24	13–11	Skjern Bank Arena, Skjern

==== Finals ====
Date	Time	Teams	Result	Half Time Res.	Venue
14 May	16:15	Bjerringbro-Silkeborg – AG København	27–29	17–15	Silkeborghallerne, Silkeborg
21 May	16:00	AG København – Bjerringbro-Silkeborg	30–21	14-7	Parken, København

== Relegation groups ==
=== Group A ===
	Team	Games	W	D	L	Goals	GD	Points
1.	Skive fH	6	3	1	2	156:151	+5	7
2.	Viborg HK	6	3	0	3	165:165	±0	7
3.	Skanderborg Håndbold	6	3	1	2	163:162	+1	7
4.	Fredericia HK	6	2	0	4	162:168	−6	6

=== Group B ===
	Team	Games	W	D	L	Goals	GD	Points
1.	Mors-Thy	6	3	1	2	186:157	+29	8
2.	Lemvig Håndbold	6	2	2	2	169:177	−8	8
3.	Stoholm Håndbold	6	2	2	2	169:173	−4	6
4.	HC Midtjylland	6	2	1	3	174:181	−7	5

Legend
Qualified Håndboldligaen 2011/12
Relegation play-off
Relegation

=== Relegation playoff ===
Teams	Result
Stoholm – Skanderborg	27–31
Skanderborg - Stoholm	29–26
