= Mads Svane Knudsen =

Danish handball player (born 2002)

Mads Svane
Personal information
- Full name: Mads Svane Knudsen
- Nationality: Danish
- Born: 25 March 2002 (age 24) Nykøbing Mors, Denmark
- Height: 1.85 m (6 ft 1 in)

Sport
- Sport: Handball
- Position: Centre back
- Current club: Bjerringbro-Silkeborg Håndbold
- Number: 10

Youth career
- Years: Team
- 2007-2021: HF Mors

Senior clubs
- Years: Team
- 2021–2024: Mors-Thy Håndbold
- 2025–: Bjerringbro-Silkeborg Håndbold
National team
Years	Team	Apps	(Gls)
2026–	Denmark	2	(6)
Medal record
European Championship
Gold medal – first place	2026 Denmark/Norway/Sweden
- Updated on 5 February 2026

Mads Svane Knudsen (born 25 March 2002) is a Danish handball player, who plays for Bjerringbro-Silkeborg Håndbold and the Danish national team.

== Career ==
Svane made his debut for his childhood club Mors-Thy Håndbold in 2021. He missed large parts of the 2022–23 season due to an injury at the 2023 U21 World Championship. In the 2023-24 he was the 11th most scoring player in the Herrehåndboldligaen with 119 goals.

On the 6th of August 2024 he announced that the 2024–25 season would be his last, as he would join league rivals Bjerringbro-Silkeborg Håndbold. Part of the motivation was to increase his chances of playing for the Danish national team. He signed a contract until 2027.

He was called of to the Danish national team for the 2026 European Men's Handball Championship. This came as a surprise to many, as he had never even featured on the Danish national team before. He made his debut in one of the preparation matches leading up to the tournament against Norway. At the 2026 European Men's Handball Championship he won gold medals, meaning that Denmark held both the World, European and Olympic titles at the same time, as only the second team ever after France's 'Les Experts'. He did however only play mere 3 minutes and 9 seconds in total at the tournament, and only made the court in the preliminary round versus North Macedonia.
