= AG København =

Danish handball club

- Full name: Albertslund Glostrup København
- Founded: 7 January 2010; 16 years ago
- Dissolved: 31 July 2012; 14 years ago
- Arena: Ballerup Super Arena
- Capacity: 7500
Home	Away

AG København (former name: AG Håndbold) was a Danish handball club. It was created by the merger of FCK Håndbold and AG Håndbold on 1 June 2010, which had been announced in a press meeting on 7 January 2010. On 31 July 2012, less than two years after its founding, the club filed for bankruptcy when the main investor and chairperson Jester 'Kasi' Nielsen withdrew from the club.

The club won its first title in 2010 where they won the Danish Men's Handball Cup, beating Århus Håndbold in the final. The same year they won the Danish Championship. In the final against Bjerringbro-Silkeborg, they beat the spectator record in the Danish league with 6,231 spectators."Håndboldklubber vil slå tilskuerrekord" (in Danish). Politiken. 6 September 2010. They would repeat the double in the 2011/2012 season, a month before they declared bankruptcy. Skive fH who were relegated that season were offered to take over AG's place in the league, and thus avoided relegation.

== Titles ==
- Danish Handball League:
  - Gold: 2010-2011, 2011-2012
- Danish Handball Cup:
  - Gold: 2010–11, 2011–12
- Danish Super Cup
  - Gold: 2011

== Notable former players ==
- Kasper Hvidt
- Rene Toft Hansen
- Arnór Atlason
- Steinar Ege
- Henrik Toft Hansen
- Joachim Boldsen
- Mikkel Hansen

== See also ==
- FCK Håndbold
- KIF Kolding København
