= Gigantium =

Event location in Aalborg, Denmark

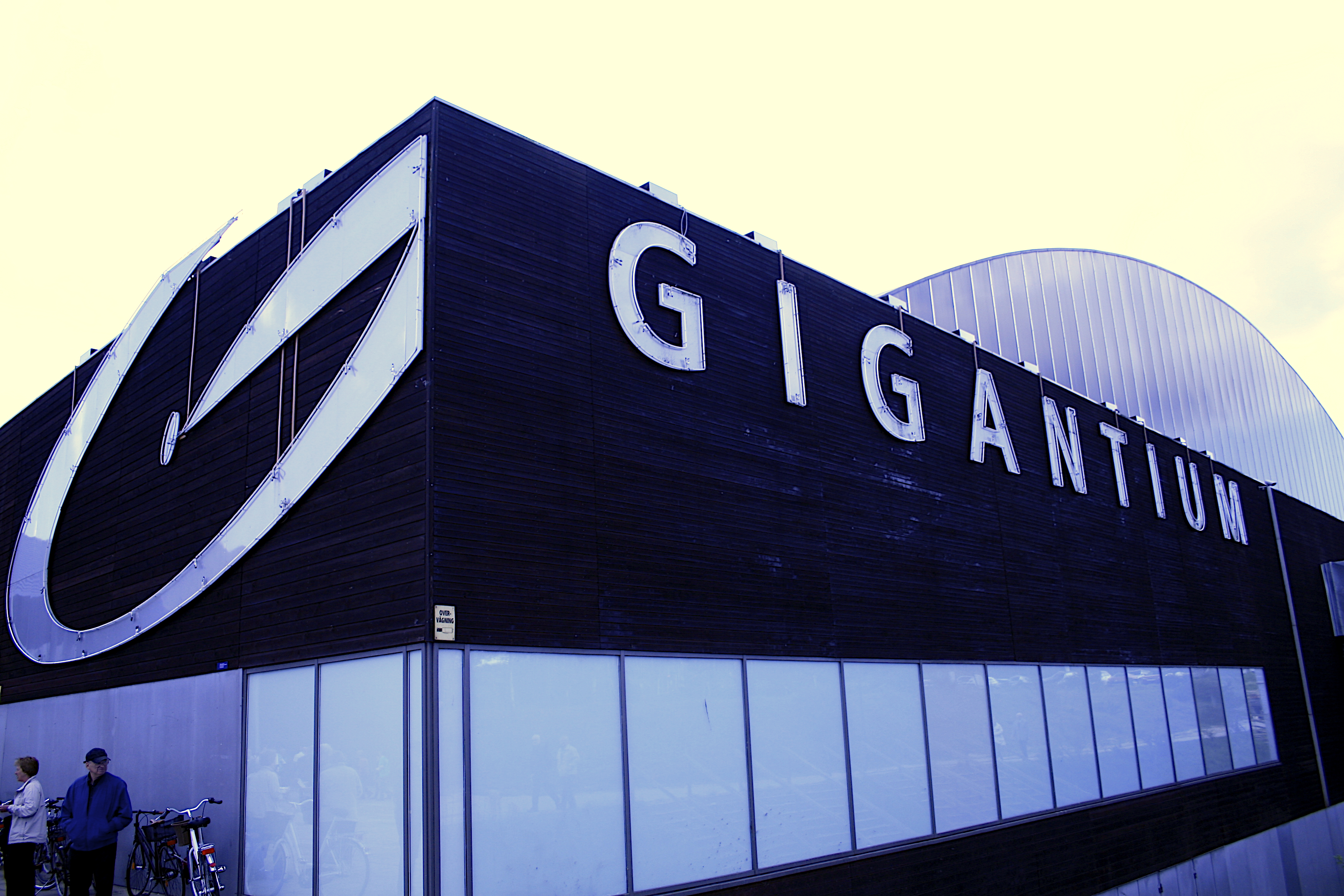
- Interactive map of Gigantium
- Location: Provstejorden 15; 9000 Aalborg, Denmark
- Coordinates: 57°1′5″N 9°57′45″E
- Owner: Aalborg Municipality
- Capacity: Concerts: 8,500; Handball: 5.500 (6.000 in Ice Arena); Ice hockey: 6,000
- Surface: Sports linoleum, hardwood, ice, artificial turf

Construction
- Opened: 1999
- Renovated: 2003 (arena)
- Expanded: 2007, 2011, 2014
- Architects: Arena: Schmidt hammer lassen Ice arena: Friis & Moltke

Tenants
- Aalborg Håndbold (1999–present); Danish Handball League (1999–present); AaB Ishockey (2007–present); Aalborg Pirates (2007–present)

Website
- gigantium.dk

The Gigantium (also called Sparekassen Danmark Arena for sponsoring reasons), in Aalborg, Denmark, is a large, rentable faire building, which hosts a large variety of concerts, markets and exhibitions, among other things.

It has a capacity of 5,500 people. For concerts, the capacity is 8,500 people. In addition, there is an ice rink/arena for training purposes, a swimming pool and an athletics hall within the sports complex. The main arena building was severely damaged by a fire on 5 July 2017.

== Tenants ==
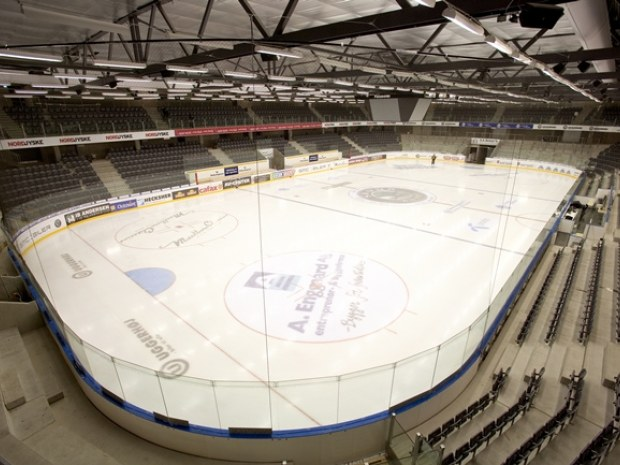
Inside Gigantium Ice Arena (2016)

The main use of the arena is sport, and it is home to the Danish Handball League club Aalborg Håndbold and the elite Ice Hockey team, the Aalborg Pirates.

The ice hockey club AaB Ishockey also play their matches in an ice arena connected to the original Gigantium arena. AaB Ishockey is the amateur club having the license for professional ice hockey being used by the Aalborg Pirates.

== Events ==
Among many other events, the arena hosted Dansk Melodi Grand Prix, the Danish National Selection show for the Eurovision Song Contest in 2006, 2010, 2012, 2015 and 2018, along with the kids version MGP Junior, and was a candidate host venue for the Eurovision Song Contest 2014, but withdrew because of the city of Aalborg did not live up to the minimum requirements of having a minimum of 3000 hotel rooms available for fans and delegations coming to the contest.

== See also ==
- List of indoor arenas in Denmark
- List of indoor arenas in Nordic countries
