= 2009–10 Håndboldligaen (men's handball) =

Jack&Jones Ligaen
- Season: 2009–10
- Champions: AaB Håndbold 1st title
- Relegated: GOG Svendborg
- EHF Champions League: AaB Håndbold, KIF Kolding
- EHF Cup: Nordsjælland Håndbold, Bjerringbro-Silkeborg
- Top goalscorer: (Denmark) Claus Møller Jakobsen (149 goals)

The 2009–10 Danish Handball League season, officially known as Jack & Jones Ligaen for sponsorship reasons, was the 74th edition of the Danish Handball League. KIF Kolding were the defending champions.

AaB Håndbold won the title, when they beat KIF Kolding in the finals. The final match was decided by a penalty shootout. This was the first time AaB won the Danish Championship. Bjerringbro-Silkeborg won the regular season. GOG Svendborg TGI were relegated, when they went bankrupt.

== League table ==
The regular season was a double round robin. The 8 best teams qualified for the championship playoff, while the last place was relegated. The rest qualified for the relegation playoff. As GOG had gone bankrupt, the teams only played 24 matches during the regular season.

=== Regular season ===
	Team	P	W	D	L	G+	G−	Diff.	Pts
1	Bjerringbro-Silkeborg	24	23	0	1	769	644	+215	46
2	FCK Håndbold	24	19	1	4	794	658	+136	39
3	AaB Håndbold	24	17	2	5	803	687	+116	36
4	KIF Kolding	24	16	2	6	745	685	+60	34
5	Nordsjælland Håndbold	24	16	0	8	716	662	+54	32
6	Skjern Håndbold	24	13	1	10	645	618	+27	27
7	Viborg HK	24	11	0	13	679	684	-5	22
8	Team Tvis Holstebro	24	9	3	12	634	655	-21	21
9	Mors-Thy Håndbold	24	9	1	14	656	718	-62	19
10	Aarhus Håndbold	24	6	1	17	640	712	-72	13
11	Fredericia HK	24	4	1	19	599	715	-116	9
12	Lemvig-Thyborøn	24	3	2	19	593	702	-109	8
13	TMS Ringsted	24	2	2	20	609	742	-133	6
14	GOG	0	0	0	0	0	0	0	0

Champion Playoff
Relegation Playoff
Relegation

=== Championship Round ===
The championship round was played in two groups of four. The winner of each group advanced to the championship finals. The second place advanced to the third place playoff.

==== Group 1 ====
	Team	P	W	D	L	G+	G−	Diff.	Pts
1	KIF Kolding	6	5	0	1	169	155	+14	11
2	Bjerringbro-Silkeborg	6	4	0	2	182	153	+29	10
3	Nordsjælland	6	3	0	3	150	148	+2	6
4	TTH	6	0	0	6	131	176	-45	0

==== Group 2 ====
	Team	P	W	D	L	G+	G−	Diff.	Pts
1	AaB	6	5	0	1	184	157	+27	11
2	FCK Håndbold	6	4	0	2	186	167	+19	10
3	Viborg HK	6	2	0	4	157	187	-30	4
4	Skjern Håndbold	6	1	0	5	154	170	-16	2

Championship Playoff
3rd Place

=== 3rd Place ===
Date	Time	Teams	Result	Half Time Res.	Venue
16 May	19:30	Bjerringbro-Silkeborg – FCK Håndbold	30–27	13–15	Silkeborghallerne, Silkeborg
20 May	20:15	FCK Håndbold – Bjerringbro-Silkeborg	27–30	12–18	Frederiksberghallen, Frederiksberg

==== Finals ====
Date	Time	Teams	Result	Half Time Res.	Venue
15 May	16:15	AaB – KIF Kolding	25–24	10–12	Gigantium, Aalborg
22 May	16:15	KIF Kolding – AaB	34–26	17-14	Kolding Hallen, Kolding
29 May	16:00	AaB – KIF Kolding	33–32	14–14	Gigantium, Aalborg
