= Aalborg Håndbold =

Danish handball club

Coordinates: 57°1′5″N 9°57′45″E

- Full name: Aalborg Håndbold
- Founded: 2000 as Aalborg HSH (later AaB Håndbold) and 2011 as Aalborg Håndbold
- Arena: Sparekassen Danmark Arena, Aalborg
- Capacity: 5500
- Sports director: Jan Larsen
- Head coach: Simon Dahl
- League: Håndboldligaen
- 2025–26: Håndboldligaen, 1st of 14
- Club colours
| Home | Away |

Aalborg Handball (Danish: Aalborg Håndbold) is a professional handball club from Aalborg, Denmark that competes in the Danish Handball League. Aalborg Håndbold play their home games in the Gigantium arena in Aalborg – known as Sparekassen Danmark Arena for sponsorship reasons. Aalborg Håndbold has won 8 Danish Championships, including the 2024–25 title, and 3 Danish Cups, including the 2025 edition. In 2021 and 2024, they reached the final of the EHF Champions League.

Location of Aalborg Håndbold

== History ==
=== Aalborg HSH ===
The precursor to Aalborg Håndbold, Aalborg HSH, was founded in 2000 as a fusion of the clubs Vadum and Aalborg KFUM. The ambition was to create a first league team in Northern Jutland. It did however not see much sporting success.

=== AaB Håndbold ===
In 2000, Aalborg Boldspilklub, a broader sports association most famous for its soccer team, took over the license of the club Aalborg HSH, establishing AaB Håndbold. AaB Håndbold was owned by AaB A/S. AaB Håndbold won the Danish Championship in 2010 with a final victory of 2–1 in matches against KIF Kolding after six free throws in the free throw competition in match 3. This ushered in a period where big names could be brought to the club, including Danish national team player Joachim Boldsen. In 2011, the team played in the EHF Champions League for the first time.

=== Aalborg Håndbold ===
In January 2011, the license was given to a new company called "Aalborg Håndbold A/S," and the team changed name to Aalborg Håndbold. Behind the new company are businessman Eigild B. Christensen and director Jan Larsen, both from Aalborg. Aalborg Håndbold won the Danish Championship in 2013, with an overall 11-goal victory over KIF Kolding Copenhagen. In 2014, Aalborg finished in second place and qualified for the Champions League 1/16 final, where they were defeated by FC Barcelona. In 2017, Aalborg won the Danish Championship for the third time. From 2019 to 2021, they won the Danish Championship three times in a row. In 2021, Aalborg reached the final of the EHF Champions League, becoming the only Danish and Nordic men's team to have done so in the Champions League era, losing to FC Barcelona. In 2023–24, Aalborg won their seventh Danish Championship and reached the EHF Champions League final, again losing to FC Barcelona. In 2024–25, they secured their eighth Danish Championship and third Danish Cup. That season they had the highest number of average spectators in Danish league history with 5,145. In the 2025-26 they won their third Championship in a row as the first team since Kolding IF in 2002-03.

== Kits ==
HOME
| 2013–14 | 2020–21 |

AWAY
| 2013–14 | 2019–20 |

== Accomplishments Men ==
- Danish Handball League: 8
  - Gold: 2010, 2013, 2017, 2019, 2020, 2021, 2024, 2025, 2026
  - Silver: 2014, 2022, 2023
- Danish Handball Cup: 4
  - Gold: 2018, 2021, 2025, 2026
  - Silver: 2011, 2020
- Danish Super Cup: 8
  - Gold: 2012, 2019, 2020, 2021, 2022, 2024, 2025, 2026
  - Silver: 2013, 2014, 2023
- EHF Champions League:
  - Silver: 2021, 2024
- IHF Super Globe:
  - Bronze: 2021

== Team ==
=== Current squad ===
Squad for the 2026–27 season

Goalkeeper

- 1 (Denmark) Niklas Landin Jacobsen
- 12 (Sweden) Fabian Norsten

Wingers
LW

- 17 (Norway) Alexander Blonz
- 19 (Denmark) Magnus Landin Jacobsen
- 23 (Denmark) Magnus Norlyk

RW

- 4 (Denmark) Patrick Wiesmach
- 18 (Denmark) Tobias Nielsen

Line players

- 2 (Sweden) Anton Lindskog
- 8 (Norway) Vetle Rønningen
- 11 (Denmark) Simon Hald
- 20 (Sweden) Felix Möller

Back players
LB

- 3 (Sweden) Lukas Nilsson
- 25 (Denmark) Marinus Munk

CB

- 5 (Norway) Sander Sagosen
- 7 (Denmark) Thomas Arnoldsen
- 21 (Germany) Juri Knorr

RB

- 9 (Norway) Patrick Helland Anderson
- 14 (Denmark) Mads Hoxer Hangaard

=== Technical staff ===
Staff for the 2025–26 season

- Head Coach: (Denmark) Simon Dahl
- Assistant Coach: (Denmark) Henrik Kronborg
- Goalkeeping Coach: (Denmark) Michael Bruun
- Physical Trainer: (Denmark) Christian Lind
- Team Physician: (Denmark) Rasmus Nymann Bager
- Masseur: (Denmark) Nikolaj Riis
- Team Doctor: (Denmark) Morten Harritz
- Team Leader: (Denmark) John Christiansen
- Team Leader: (Denmark) Torbjørn Christensen
- Team Leader: (Denmark) Christian Müller

=== Transfers ===
Transfers for the 2026–27 season

Joining

- (Sweden) Anton Lindskog (LP) from (Denmark) GOG Håndbold
- (Denmark) Magnus Landin Jacobsen (LW) from (Germany) THW Kiel
- (Denmark) Magnus Norlyk (LW) from (Denmark) Mors-Thy Håndbold
- (Denmark) Simon Skovhus (CB) from (Denmark) Aarhus Håndbold
- (Denmark) Tobias Nielsen (RW) back from loan at (Denmark) HØJ Elite

Leaving

- (Norway) Kristian Bjørnsen (RW) (retires)
- (Denmark) René Antonsen (LP) to (France) HBC Nantes
- (Denmark) Buster Juul (LW) to (Denmark) Bjerringbro-Silkeborg Håndbold
- (Denmark) Simon Skovhus (CB) on loan at (Denmark) Mors-Thy Håndbold

Transfers for the 2027–28 season

Joining

- (Faroe Islands) Elias Ellefsen á Skipagøtu (CB) from (Germany) THW Kiel
- (Denmark) Mads Svane Knudsen (CB) from (Denmark) Bjerringbro-Silkeborg Håndbold
- (Denmark) Simon Skovhus (CB) back from loan at (Denmark) Mors-Thy Håndbold

Leaving

- (Germany) Juri Knorr (CB) to (France) Paris Saint-Germain Handball

=== Transfer History ===
Transfers for the 2025–26 season

Joining

- (Germany) Juri Knorr (CB) from (Germany) Rhein-Neckar Löwen
- (Norway) Alexander Blonz (LW) from (Denmark) GOG Håndbold
- (Norway) Patrick Helland Anderson (RB) from (Norway) Elverum Håndball
- (Norway) Vetle Rønningen (LP) from (Denmark) Skjern Håndbold
- (Denmark) Tobias Nielsen (RW) from (Denmark) TMS Ringsted

Leaving

- (Norway) Sebastian Barthold (LW) to (Germany) SC Magdeburg
- (Portugal) Miguel Martins (CB) to (Romania) CS Dinamo București
- (Slovenia) Aleks Vlah (CB) to (Poland) Vive Kielce
- (Denmark) Mads Vestergaard (LW) (to (Denmark) Elitesport Vendsyssel)
- (Denmark) Henrik Møllgaard (LB) (Retires)
- (Sweden) Jack Thurin (RB) (to (France) Montpellier Handball)
- (Denmark) Martin Larsen (RB) (Retires)
- (Denmark) Tobias Nielsen (RW) on loan at (Denmark) HØJ Elite

== Notable former players ==
- (Denmark) Joachim Boldsen (2007–2008)
- (Denmark) Jannick Green (2008–2011)
- (Denmark) Mads Christiansen (2008–2011, 2019–2021)
- (Denmark) Jacob Bagersted (2011–2014)
- (Denmark) Henrik Toft Hansen (2006–2011)
- (Denmark) Mads Mensah Larsen (2012–2014)
- (Denmark) Søren Rasmussen (2003–2010)
- (Denmark) Rune Ohm (2003–2006)
- (Denmark) Jesper Meinby (2017–2019)
- (Denmark) Magnus Saugstrup (2014–2021)
- (Denmark) Mikkel Hansen (2022–2024)
- (Denmark) Henrik Møllgaard (2009–2012, 2018–2025)
- (Denmark) Martin Larsen (2005–2018, 2021–2025)
- (Spain) Isaías Guardiola (2014–2015)
- (Iceland) Aron Pálmarsson (2021–2023)
- (Iceland) Janus Daði Smárason (2017–2020)
- (Iceland) Ómar Ingi Magnússon (2018–2020)
- (Iceland) Stefán Rafn Sigurmannsson (2016–2017)
- (Norway) Kristian Kjelling (2009–2013)
- (Norway) Ole Erevik (2011–2015)
- (Norway) Håvard Tvedten (2002–2006, 2011–2016)
- (Norway) Børge Lund (2002–2006)
- (Norway) Kjetil Strand (2006–2007)
- (Norway) Kristian Sæverås (2018–2020)
- (Norway) André Jørgensen (2006–2009)
- (Norway) Sebastian Barthold (2017–2025)
- (Sweden) Johan Sjöstrand (2012–2013)
- (Sweden) Andreas Palicka (2015–2016)
- (Sweden) Jonas Larholm (2008–2012)
- (Sweden) Johan Jakobsson (2011–2014)
- (Sweden) Jan Lennartsson (2007–2013)
- (Sweden) Felix Claar (2020–2023)
- (Sweden) Lukas Sandell (2020–2023)
- (Croatia) Lovro Jotić (2017–2018)
- (Portugal) Miguel Martins (2024–2025)

=== Coaches throughout the years ===
- (Denmark) Peter Bredsdorff-Larsen (2008–2011)
- (Sweden) Robert Hedin (2011–2012)
- (Denmark) Nikolaj Jacobsen (2012–2014)
- (Denmark) Jesper Jensen (2014–2016)
- (Iceland) Aron Kristjánsson (2016–2018)
- (Denmark) Stefan Madsen (2018–2024)
- (Germany) Maik Machulla (2024)
- (Denmark) Simon Dahl (2024–present)

== European Handball ==
=== EHF Champions League ===
| Season | Round | Club | Home | Away | Aggregate | Comment |
|---|---|---|---|---|---|---|
| 2010–11 | Group matches (Group C) | Multiple opponents | – | – | – | 6th place |
| 2013–14 | Group matches | (Germany) SG Flensburg-Handewitt | 26–27 | 31–27 | 4th place | – |
| 2013–14 | Group matches | (Spain) Naturhouse La Rioja | 28–24 | 25–23 | 4th place | – |
| 2013–14 | Group matches | (Germany) HSV Hamburg | 26–28 | 28–20 | 4th place | – |
| 2013–14 | Group matches | (Slovenia) RK Gorenje Velenje | 23–28 | 25–30 | 4th place | – |
| 2013–14 | Group matches | (Sweden) HK Drott | 37–23 | 26–35 | 4th place | – |
| 2013–14 | Last 16 | (Spain) FC Barcelona | 22–29 | 20–31 | 42–60 | – |
| 2014–15 | Group matches | (France) Dunkerque Handball Grand Littoral | 25–28 | 23–23 | 4th place | – |
| 2014–15 | Group matches | (Hungary) SC Pick Szeged | 25–28 | 25–23 | 4th place | – |
| 2014–15 | Group matches | (Switzerland) Kadetten Schaffhausen | 23–23 | 25–25 | 4th place | – |
| 2014–15 | Group matches | (Ukraine) HC Motor Zaporizhzhia | 30–36 | 25–28 | 4th place | – |
| 2014–15 | Group matches | (Poland) Vive Targi Kielce | 25–27 | 33–26 | 4th place | – |
| 2014–15 | Last 16 | (Spain) FC Barcelona | 11–31 | 22–29 | 33–60 | – |
| 2017–18 | Group matches (Group B) | Multiple opponents | – | – | – | 8th place |
| 2019–20 | Group matches (Group A) | Multiple opponents | – | – | – | 4th place, playoffs cancelled due to COVID-19 |
| 2020–21 | Group matches (Group B) | (Spain) FC Barcelona | 32–35 | 33–42 | 4th place | – |
| 2020–21 | Group matches (Group B) | (Hungary) Telekom Veszprém | 27–33 | 32–30 | 4th place | – |
| 2020–21 | Group matches (Group B) | (Germany) THW Kiel | 23–31 | 26–28 | 4th place | – |
| 2020–21 | Group matches (Group B) | (Ukraine) HC Motor Zaporizhzhia | 38–29 | 29–27 | 4th place | – |
| 2020–21 | Group matches (Group B) | (France) HBC Nantes | 32–24 | 29–38 | 4th place | – |
| 2020–21 | Group matches (Group B) | (Slovenia) RK Celje | 0–10 | 31–29 | 4th place | Home game assessed by the EHF |
| 2020–21 | Group matches (Group B) | (Croatia) PPD Zagreb | 38–29 | 27–26 | 4th place | – |
| 2020–21 | Last 16 | (Portugal) FC Porto | 27–24 | 29–32 | 56–56 (a) | – |
| 2020–21 | Quarterfinals | (Germany) SG Flensburg-Handewitt | 26–21 | 29–33 | 55–54 | – |
| 2020–21 | Semifinal | (France) Paris Saint-Germain | 35–33 | | | – |
| 2020–21 | Final | (Spain) FC Barcelona | 23–36 | | | Silver |
| 2021–22 | Group matches (Group A) | (Croatia) PPD Zagreb | 31–25 | 34–24 | 1st place | – |
| 2021–22 | Group matches (Group A) | (France) Montpellier HB | 36–28 | 33–31 | 1st place | – |
| 2021–22 | Group matches (Group A) | (North Macedonia) RK Vardar | 33–29 | 28–30 | 1st place | – |
| 2021–22 | Group matches (Group A) | (Belarus) Meshkov Brest | 34–33 | 33–30 | 1st place | – |
| 2021–22 | Group matches (Group A) | (Hungary) Pick Szeged | 34–30 | 28–31 | 1st place | – |
| 2021–22 | Group matches (Group A) | (Germany) THW Kiel | 35–33 | 28–31 | 1st place | – |
| 2021–22 | Group matches (Group A) | (Norway) Elverum Håndball | 32–27 | 34–28 | 1st place | – |
| 2021–22 | Quarterfinals | (Hungary) Telekom Veszprém | 37–35 | 29–36 | 66–71 | – |
| 2022–23 | Group matches (Group B) | (Slovenia) Celje Pivovarna Laško | 36–32 | 34–31 | 5th place | – |
| 2022–23 | Group matches (Group B) | (Norway) Elverum Håndball | 31–24 | 33–25 | 5th place | – |
| 2022–23 | Group matches (Group B) | (Poland) Barlinek Industria Kielce | 28–30 | 28–33 | 5th place | – |
| 2022–23 | Group matches (Group B) | (Hungary) OTP Bank - Pick Szeged | 33–27 | 41–29 | 5th place | – |
| 2022–23 | Group matches (Group B) | (Spain) Barça | 33–39 | 26–32 | 5th place | – |
| 2022–23 | Group matches (Group B) | (Germany) THW Kiel | 26–30 | 36–36 | 5th place | – |
| 2022–23 | Group matches (Group B) | (France) HBC Nantes | 33–34 | 28–35 | 5th place | – |
| 2022–23 | Last 16 | (Denmark) GOG Håndbold | 30–28 | 24–32 | 54–60 | – |
| 2023–24 | Group matches (Group A) | (Poland) Industria Kielce | 35–35 | 34–31 | 2nd place | – |
| 2023–24 | Group matches (Group A) | (North Macedonia) RK Eurofarm Pelister | 38–23 | 33–28 | 2nd place | – |
| 2023–24 | Group matches (Group A) | (Hungary) OTP Bank - Pick Szeged | 31–26 | 27–34 | 2nd place | – |
| 2023–24 | Group matches (Group A) | (Croatia) RK Zagreb | 32–22 | 30–30 | 2nd place | – |
| 2023–24 | Group matches (Group A) | (France) Paris Saint-Germain | 30–32 | 30–33 | 2nd place | – |
| 2023–24 | Group matches (Group A) | (Norway) Kolstad Håndball | 27–25 | 29–18 | 2nd place | – |
| 2023–24 | Group matches (Group A) | (Germany) THW Kiel | 27–27 | 27–18 | 2nd place | – |
| 2023–24 | Quarterfinals | (Hungary) Telekom Veszprém | 33–28 | 31–32 | 64–60 | – |
| 2023–24 | Semifinal | (Germany) SC Magdeburg | 28–26 | | | – |
| 2023–24 | Final | (Spain) FC Barcelona | 30–31 | | | Silver |
| 2024–25 | Group matches (Group B) | (France) HBC Nantes | 38–31 | 29–29 | 2nd place | – |
| 2024–25 | Group matches (Group B) | (Croatia) RK Zagreb | 33–30 | 23–31 | 2nd place | – |
| 2024–25 | Group matches (Group B) | (Germany) SC Magdeburg | 33–33 | 31–32 | 2nd place | – |
| 2024–25 | Group matches (Group B) | (Spain) Barça | 36–35 | 27–35 | 2nd place | – |
| 2024–25 | Group matches (Group B) | (Hungary) OTP Bank - Pick Szeged | 29–28 | 32–30 | 2nd place | – |
| 2024–25 | Group matches (Group B) | (Poland) Industria Kielce | 34–26 | 35–28 | 2nd place | – |
| 2024–25 | Group matches (Group B) | (Norway) Kolstad Håndball | 30–28 | 24–25 | 2nd place | – |
| 2024–25 | Quarterfinals | (Germany) Füchse Berlin | 36–40 | 29–37 | 65–77 | – |
| 2025–26 | Group matches (Group A) | (Hungary) One Veszprém | 32–28 | 38–33 | 2nd place | – |
| 2025–26 | Group matches (Group A) | (Germany) Füchse Berlin | 36–35 | 31–35 | 2nd place | – |
| 2025–26 | Group matches (Group A) | (Portugal) Sporting CP | 35–30 | 33–35 | 2nd place | – |
| 2025–26 | Group matches (Group A) | (Norway) Kolstad Håndball | 36–24 | 35–26 | 2nd place | – |
| 2025–26 | Group matches (Group A) | (Romania) CS Dinamo București | 34–28 | 30–27 | 2nd place | – |
| 2025–26 | Group matches (Group A) | (France) HBC Nantes | 31–24 | 28–27 | 2nd place | – |
| 2025–26 | Group matches (Group A) | (Poland) Industria Kielce | 34–27 | 32–32 | 2nd place | – |
| 2025–26 | Quarterfinals | (Portugal) Sporting CP | 37–36 | 31–31 | 68–67 | – |
| 2025–26 | Semifinals | (Spain) Barça | 32–37 ET | | | – |
| 2025–26 | Third place game | (Germany) SC Magdeburg | 26–32 | | | – |

== Retired numbers ==
Aalborg Håndbold
| No. | Player | Position | Tenure | Ceremony Date |
|---|---|---|---|---|
| 10 | Håvard Tvedten | Left Wing | 2002–2006; 2011–2016 | 17/05/2016 |
| 24 | Mikkel Hansen | Left Back | 2022–2024 | 11/06/2024 |
