= Bjerringbro-Silkeborg Håndbold =

Danish handball club

Bjerringbro-Silkeborg
- Full name: Bjerringbro-Silkeborg Håndbold
- Short name: BSH
- Founded: 2005; 21 years ago
- Arena: JYSK Arena
- Capacity: 3,000
- President: Frank Lajer
- Head coach: Simon Sørensen
- League: Håndboldligaen
- 2025-26: 7th of 14 (regular season)
- Club colours
| Home | Away |

Bjerringbro-Silkeborg Håndbold is a handball club, based in the two Danish cities of Bjerringbro and Silkeborg. Currently, Bjerringbro-Silkeborg competes in the men's Danish Handball League. The home arena of the team is JYSK Arena.

Location of Bjerringbro-Silkeborg

The official fan club is called BSH Support. The fan club has previously been known as BSV Support and as Black Eagles.

== History ==
The club was founded in 2005, when Bjerringbro FH and Silkeborg-Voel KFUM merged their first teams to create the new club. The mother club Bjerringbro FH won the silver medal of the Danish Handball League in 2002. Silkeborg-Voel KFUM and Bjerringbro FH has continued to compete separately with their respective women's teams.

In the 2011-12 season they played in the EHF Champions League for the first time after losing the final of the 2010-11 Danish Championship to AG København.

In 2016 the club won their first Danish championship, beating Team Tvis Holstebro in the final. The same year they also won the Danish Super Cup.

In 2018 Silkeborg-Voel decided to leave the cooperation, so Bjerringbro FH would be the sole mother club. The club did however continue coorporating in talent development. Therefore, ahead of the 2019-2020 season the club changed their name from Bjerringbro-Silkeborg-Voel to Bjerringbro-Silkeborg Håndbold, and changed their logo at the same occasion.

== Results ==
- Danish Handball League:
  - Gold: 2016
  - Silver: 2011, 2012, 2018, 2021
  - Bronze: 2010, 2015, 2017, 2022
- Danish Super Cup
  - Gold: 2016

=== Kits ===
HOME
| 2011–12 | 2016–18 |

AWAY
| 2011–12 | 2016–17 | 2019–20 | 2024–25 |

== Team ==
=== Current squad ===
Squad for the 2026–27 season

Goalkeeper

- 1 (Sweden) Marko Roganovic
- 29 (Denmark) Sebastian Frandsen

Wingers
LW

- 20 (Denmark) Kasper Kjærgaard
- 23 (Denmark) Buster Juul

RW

- 4 (Denmark) Patrick Boldsen
- 74 (Denmark) Rasmus Lyngsø

Pivot

- 14 (Denmark) Alexander Lynggaard
- 19 (Denmark) Thor Christensen
- 22 (Denmark) Anders Zachariassen

Back players
LB

- 25 (Denmark) Hjalte Sinding
- 97 (Denmark) Magnus Rahbek Sand

CB

- 10 (Denmark) Mads Svane Knudsen
- 11 (Denmark) Rasmus Lauge
- 17 (Norway) Ciljan Sagosen

RB

- 13 (Norway) Lasse Sunde Lid
- 21 (Denmark) Gustav Bundgaard

=== Technical staff ===
- Head Coach: (Denmark) Simon Sørensen
- Assistant Coach: (Denmark) Mathias Albrektsen

=== Transfers ===
Transfers for the 2026–27 season

Joining

- (Norway) Ciljan Sagosen (CB) from (Norway) Bergen Håndball
- (Denmark) Buster Juul (LW) from (Denmark) Aalborg Håndbold
- (Denmark) Sebastian Frandsen (GK) from (Denmark) Fredericia HK

Leaving

- (Denmark) Nikolaj Læsø (LB) to (Germany) HSG Wetzlar
- (Denmark) Mads Lenbroch (LW) to (Romania) CS Dinamo București
- (Denmark) Kasper Larsen (GK) to (Denmark) Skive fH
- (Denmark) August Fridén (LW) (retires)
- (Denmark) Peter Balling (RB) (retires)
- (Denmark) Nikolaj Øris Nielsen (RB) (retires)

=== Transfer History ===
Transfers for the 2025–26 season

Joining

- (Sweden) Marko Roganovic (GK) from (Sweden) Eskilstuna Guif
- (Denmark) Mads Svane Knudsen (CB) from (Denmark) Mors-Thy Håndbold
- (Denmark) Thor Christensen (LP) from (Denmark) Skanderborg AGF Håndbold

Leaving

- (Iceland) Guðmundur Bragi Ástþórsson (CB) to (Denmark) TMS Ringsted
- (Denmark) Mikkel Løvkvist (GK) (to (France) Paris Saint-Germain Handball)
- (Denmark) Morten Olsen (CB) (retires)
- (Denmark) Victor Ilsøe (RW) (to (Denmark) Skive fH)
- (Denmark) René Toft Hansen (P) (retires)
- (Denmark) Benjamin Jakobsen (P) (to ?)

== European Handball ==
=== EHF Champions League ===
| Season | Round | Club | Home | Away | Aggregate |
|---|---|---|---|---|---|
| 2010–11 | Qualification; Wild Card Round | (Spain) CB Ademar León | 27–26 | | 2nd |
| 2010–11 | Qualification; Wild Card Round | (Germany) Rhein-Neckar Löwen | 26–31 | | 2nd |
| 2010–11 | Qualification; Wild Card Round | (Slovenia) RK Gorenje | 31–28 | | 2nd |
| 2011–12 | Group Stage; Group B | (Spain) Atlético Madrid BM | 27–30 | 31–27 | 6th place |
| 2011–12 | Group Stage; Group B | (Poland) Vive Targi Kielce | 26–37 | 29–37 | 6th place |
| 2011–12 | Group Stage; Group B | (Germany) Füchse Berlin | 25–30 | 27–28 | 6th place |
| 2011–12 | Group Stage; Group B | (Hungary) MKB Veszprém KC | 19–25 | 25–32 | 6th place |
| 2011–12 | Group Stage; Group B | (Russia) Chekhovskiye Medvedi | 25–35 | 30–23 | 6th place |
| 2012–13 | Group Stage; Group C | (Poland) Vive Targi Kielce | 25–34 | 26–35 | 4th place |
| 2012–13 | Group Stage; Group C | (France) Chambéry Savoie Handball | 25–23 | 26–29 | 4th place |
| 2012–13 | Group Stage; Group C | (North Macedonia) RK Metalurg Skopje | 23–26 | 32–18 | 4th place |
| 2012–13 | Group Stage; Group C | (Slovenia) RK Gorenje | 27–26 | 23–31 | 4th place |
| 2012–13 | Group Stage; Group C | (Russia) Saint Petersburg HC | 31–22 | 35–23 | 4th place |
| 2012–13 | Last 16 | (Spain) FC Barcelona | 26–32 | 24–26 | 50–58 |
| 2016–17 | Group Stage; Group A | (Spain) Barcelona | 23–27 | 19–34 | 6th place |
| 2016–17 | Group Stage; Group A | (France) Paris Saint-Germain | 30–36 | 27–32 | 6th place |
| 2016–17 | Group Stage; Group A | (Hungary) MVM Veszprém | 24–29 | 29–30 | 6th place |
| 2016–17 | Group Stage; Group A | (Germany) Flensburg-Handewitt | 19–25 | 24–26 | 6th place |
| 2016–17 | Group Stage; Group A | (Germany) THW Kiel | 25–28 | 24–21 | 6th place |
| 2016–17 | Group Stage; Group A | (Poland) Orlen Wisła Płock | 33–24 | 25–28 | 6th place |
| 2016–17 | Group Stage; Group A | (Switzerland) Kadetten Schaffhausen | 37–32 | 25–24 | 6th place |
| 2016–17 | Round of 16 | (Hungary) Pick Szeged | 24–26 | 24–33 | 48–59 |
| 2018–19 | Group Stage; Group C | (Portugal) Sporting CP | 29–28 | 35–32 | 1st place |
| 2018–19 | Group Stage; Group C | (Slovakia) Tatran Prešov | 29–30 | 24–26 | 1st place |
| 2018–19 | Group Stage; Group C | (Russia) Chekhovskiye Medvedi | 39–28 | 30–24 | 1st place |
| 2018–19 | Group Stage; Group C | (Turkey) Beşiktaş | 34–27 | 37–24 | 1st place |
| 2018–19 | Group Stage; Group C | (North Macedonia) Metalurg Skopje | 33–25 | 33–29 | 1st place |
| 2018–19 | Playoff | (Poland) Wisła Płock | 26–22 | 20–27 | 46–49 |

=== EHF Cup/EHF European League ===
| Season | Round | Club | Home | Away | Aggregate |
|---|---|---|---|---|---|
| 2002–03 | Round 3 | (Sweden) IFK Ystad HK | 27–23 | 26–26 | 53–49 |
| 2002–03 | Round 4 | (Norway) Sandefjord TIF | 25–21 | 25–22 | 50–43 |
| 2002–03 | 1/4 Final | (Spain) BM Altea | 20–24 | 23–24 | 43–48 |
| 2008–09 | Round 3 | (Bulgaria) HC Lokomotive Warna | 39–26 | 32–22 | 71–48 |
| 2008–09 | 1/8 Final | (Germany) TBV Lemgo | 26–23 | 25–28 | 51–51 |
| 2008–09 | 1/4 Final | (Slovenia) RK Gorenje | 24–25 | 26–27 | 50–52 |
| 2010–11 | Round 3 | (Norway) Drammen HK | 38–28 | 31–21 | 69–49 |
| 2010–11 | Last 16 | (Germany) TV Grosswallstadt | 22–22 | 27–29 | 49–51 |
| 2015–16 | Round 3 | (Czech Republic) Talent M.A.T Plzeň | 35–23 | 31–28 | 66–51 |
| 2015–16 | Group Stage; Group C | (France) Saint-Raphael Var Handball | 31–26 | 25–23 | 1st place |
| 2015–16 | Group Stage; Group C | (Switzerland) Pfadi Winterthur | 27–27 | 28–25 | 1st place |
| 2015–16 | Group Stage; Group C | (Belarus) SKA Minsk | 32–26 | 25–28 | 1st place |
| 2015–16 | 1/4 Final | (Spain) Fraikin BM Granollers | 32–26 | 24–30 | 56–56 |
| 2017–18 | Round 3 | (Sweden) HK Malmö | 36–25 | 23–25 | 59–50 |
| 2017–18 | Group Stage; Group A | (Germany) SC Magdeburg | 27–26 | 26–33 | 2nd place |
| 2017–18 | Group Stage; Group A | (Slovakia) Tatran Prešov | 27–19 | 28–32 | 2nd place |
| 2017–18 | Group Stage; Group A | (Belarus) SKA Minsk | 32–30 | 26–27 | 2nd place |
| 2020–21 | First qualifying round | (Germany) MT Melsungen | 31–27 | 26–24 | 57–51 |
| 2020–21 | Second qualifying round | (Russia) HC CSKA | 26–23 | 24–32 | 50–55 |
| 2021–22 | First qualifying round | (Sweden) Ystads IF | 22–23 | 27–25 | 49–48 |
| 2021–22 | Second qualifying round | (Croatia) RK Nexe | 26–32 | 33–27 | 59–59 |
| 2022–23 | Second qualifying round | (Portugal) Sporting CP | 22–31 | 33–30 | 55–61 |
| 2023–24 | Group Stage; Group F | (Spain) Logroño La Rioja | 34–25 | 29–28 | 1st place |
| 2023–24 | Group Stage; Group F | (Serbia) RK Vojvodina | 26–22 | 28–29 | 1st place |
| 2023–24 | Group Stage; Group F | (North Macedonia) HC Alkaloid | 35–31 | 31–23 | 1st place |
| 2023–24 | Main round Group III | (Germany) SG Flensburg-Handewitt | 26–45 | 28–38 | 2nd place |
| 2023–24 | Main round Group III | (Switzerland) Kadetten Schaffhausen | 36–30 | 34–33 | 2nd place |
| 2023–24 | Playoffs | (Romania) Dinamo București | 24–27 | 34–37 | 58–64 |
| 2024–25 | Qualification round | (Hungary) FTC-Green Collect | 45–27 | 32–34 | 77–61 |
| 2024–25 | Group Stage; Group B | (France) Montpellier Handball | 22–34 | 26–40 | 3rd place |
| 2024–25 | Group Stage; Group B | (Poland) Górnik Zabrze | 30–26 | 25–25 | 3rd place |
| 2024–25 | Group Stage; Group B | (Spain) Fraikin BM Granollers | 35–32 | 27–36 | 3rd place |

=== EHF Cup Winners' Cup ===
| Season | Round | Club | Home | Away | Aggregate |
|---|---|---|---|---|---|
| 2006–07 | Round 2 | (Hungary) Komlói BKS-Fűtőerőmű | 35–24 | 23–23 | 58–47 |
| 2006–07 | Round 3 | (Croatia) RK Medveščak Zagreb | 31–20 | 29–30 | 60–50 |
| 2006–07 | 1/8 Final | (Switzerland) Kadetten Schaffhausen | 30–20 | 28–30 | 58–50 |
| 2006–07 | 1/4 Final | (Spain) CB Ademar León | 30–36 | 27–28 | 57–64 |

== Notable former players ==
Men

- (Denmark) Niklas Landin Jacobsen
- (Denmark) Jannick Green
- (Denmark) Rasmus Lauge Schmidt
- (Denmark) Henrik Toft Hansen
- (Denmark) Lars Krogh Jeppesen
- (Denmark) Casper U. Mortensen
- (Denmark) Morten Olsen
- (Denmark) Sebastian Frandsen
- (Denmark) Kasper Nielsen
- (Denmark) Mads Christiansen
- (Denmark) Sørenn Rasmussen
- (Denmark) Jesper Nøddesbo
- (Denmark) Mads Øris Nielsen
- (Denmark) Klaus Thomsen
- (Denmark) Michael V. Knudsen
- (Switzerland) Andy Schmid
- (Norway) Espen Lie Hansen
- (Norway) Kristian Kjelling
- (Sweden) Fredrik Petersen
- (Sweden) Linus Persson
- (Iceland) Sigvaldi Guðjónsson
- (Iceland) Kári Kristjánsson
- (Serbia) Milutin Dragićević
- (North Macedonia) Aco Jonovski
- (Slovenia) Miha Žvižej
- (Slovenia) Sebastian Skube

(Denmark) Stefan Hundstrup

== See also ==
- Silkeborg-Voel KFUM
- Bjerringbro FH
