= Danish Men's Handball Cup =

Danish handball tournament

Tournament information
- Location: Denmark
- Established: 1964; 62 years ago
- Qualifier for: EHF European League
- Most championships: GOG Håndbold (12 titles)
- Website: www.dhf.dk

Current champion
- Aalborg Håndbold (2025)

Most recent tournament
- Danish Handball Cup 2025

The Danish Men's Handball cup (Danish: Landspokalturneringen i håndbold for herrer) is the nationwide cup tournament for men's handball teams in Denmark. It’s also known as Santander Cup for sponsorship reasons. The competition has been played annually since 1964.

== Tournament structure ==
The initial fase of the tournament is split in two. They are managed by the three regional federations, Jydsk Håndbold Forbund (JHF) in Jutland, and Håndboldregion Øst (HRØ) in Sealand together with Fyns Håndbold Forbund (FHF) in fyn. The western half of the initial tournament lasts 7 rounds, while the eastern half lasts 6 round. After the initial fase the DHF taking over the tournament at the round of 16. At the round of 16 and onwards, there are no longer geographical considerations, when drawing the matches. The tournament ultimately results in a final four event scheduled between Christmas and New Year. The winner of the tournament qualify for the annual Super Cup held during the summer where they meet the season's league winner. If the same team wins both the league and the cup, the losing cup finalist will participate as the second team in the Super Cup. The winner also qualifies for the EHF European League.

== Continental Qualification ==
The winner of the tournament qualifies for the continental tournament EHF European League. If the team is already qualified for the tournament or the EHF Champions League, the loser of the final will qualify instead. If they are also qualified, the qualification spot will go the whichever of the two losing semifinalists, who finished the highest in the league table.

== History ==
The Cup tournament was introduced for the first time in 1964, together with the Danish Women's Handball Cup.

From 2001 to 2014 all finals where played in Aarhus, with the exception of 2011 where it took plays in Aalborg. Since 2010 the semifinals and finals have been played at one big event, where the semifinals are played on a saturday, while the final is played the day after, on sunday.

In 2010-11 DHF introduced a final four event. From the 2015-16 season onwards, third-place matches were introduced.

== Past winners ==
=== Finals ===
Here is the list of Cup finals since 1964.

Year	Winner	Results	Runner-up
1964	IF Ajax (1)	21-19	Aarhus KFUM
1965	IK Skovbakken (1)	13-11	Helsingør IF
1966	Aarhus KFUM (1)	13-11	Tarup-Paarup IF
1967	AGF (1)	19-14	IF Stadion
1968	IK Skovbakken (2)	25-23	IF Stadion
1969	IF Stadion (1)	25-20	Aarhus KFUM
1970	HK KVIK Esbjerg (1)	16-15	IK Skovbakken
1971	Fredericia KFUM (1)	15-13	IF Stadion
1972	Fredericia KFUM (2)	25-20	Helsingør IF
1973	Fredericia KFUM (3)	18-16	IF Stadion
1974	Fredericia KFUM (4)	30-17	FIF
1975	IK Skovbakken (3)	16-15	Holte IF
1976	Fredericia KFUM (5)	27-16	Aarhus KFUM
1977	Fredericia KFUM (6)	30-18	Aalborg HK
1978	AB (1)	26-21	Fredericia KFUM
1979	Helsingør IF (1)	20-19	IK Skovbakken
1980	Aarhus KFUM (2)	21-18	Helsingør IF
1981	Fredericia KFUM (7)	27-18	Helsingør IF
1982	Helsingør IF (2)	31-25	Gladsaxe HG
1983	Gladsaxe HG (1)	19-18	IF Ajax
1984	HIK (1)	27-18	Ribe HK
1985	Helsingør IF (3)	39-38(agg.)	Gladsaxe HG
1986	Holte IF (1)	43-32(agg.)	Holbæk HK
1987	Helsingør IF (4)	25-22	Kolding IF
1988	Virum-Sorgenfri HK (1)	18-16	Gladsaxe HG
1989	Kolding IF (1)	29-18	Gladsaxe HG
1990	GOG (1)	19-14	Gladsaxe HG
1991	GOG (2)	25-19	Kolding IF
1992	GOG (3)	22-19	Vejlby-Risskov IK
1993	Kolding IF (2)	26-21	GOG
1994	HK Roar (1)	26-19	Skjern Håndbold
1995	GOG (4)	33-20	Vrold-Skanderborg HK
1996	GOG (5)	30-29	Kolding IF
1997	GOG (6)	36-22	Otterup HK
1998	Kolding IF (3)	27-25	Skjern Håndbold
1999	Skjern Håndbold (1)	24-20	FIF
2000	Viborg HK (1)	28-23	KIF Kolding
2001	KIF Kolding (4)	32-26	GOG
2002	GOG (7)	32-27	Viborg HK
2003	GOG (8)	33-30	Skjern Håndbold
2004	KIF Kolding (5)	41-33	Skjern Håndbold
2005	GOG Svendborg TGI (9)	36-26	Bjerringbro-Silkeborg
2006	KIF Kolding (6)	37-33	Viborg HK
2007	KIF Kolding (7)	28-23	GOG Svendborg TGI
2008	Team Tvis Holstebro (1)	32-23	GOG Svendborg TGI
2009	FCK Håndbold (1)	31-30	Bjerringbro-Silkeborg
2010	AG København (1)	26-20	Århus Håndbold
2011	AG København (2)	32-26	Aalborg Håndbold
2012	Århus Håndbold (1)	27-26	Skjern Håndbold
2013	KIF Kolding København (8)	28-24	Bjerringbro-Silkeborg
2014	Skjern Håndbold (2)	24-20	Team Tvis Holstebro
2015	HC Midtjylland (1)	30-26	GOG
2016	Skjern Håndbold (3)	27-20	Bjerringbro-Silkeborg
2017	TTH Holstebro (2)	26-21	GOG
2018	Aalborg Håndbold (1)	28-27	Skanderborg Håndbold
2019	GOG (10)	30-28	TTH Holstebro
2020	Mors-Thy Håndbold (1)	32-31	Aalborg Håndbold
2021	Aalborg Håndbold (2)	30-27	GOG Håndbold
2022	GOG Håndbold (11)	34-29	Skjern Håndbold
2023	GOG Håndbold (12)	32-25	Aalborg Håndbold
2024	Aalborg Håndbold (3)	34-29	Bjerringbro-Silkeborg
2025	Aalborg Håndbold (4)	34-24	TMS Ringsted

=== Most valuable players ===
Since 1993, DHF has named an MVP (Danish: pokalfighter) following the cup final.

Season	Player	Club
1993	(Denmark) Kim G. Jakobsen	Kolding IF
1994	(Denmark) Jan Kirkegaard	HK Roar
1995	(Denmark) René Boeriths	GOG Gudme
1996	(Bosnia and Herzegovina) Bilal Suman	Kolding IF
1997	(Denmark) Joachim Boldsen	GOG Gudme
1998	(Denmark) Kristian Asmussen	Kolding IF
1999	(Denmark) Søren Gottfredsen	Skjern Håndbold
2000	(Denmark) Michael V. Knudsen	Viborg HK
2001	(Sweden) Fredrik Ohlander	KIF Kolding
2002	(Denmark) Frank Brøndum	Viborg HK
2003	(Denmark) Michael V. Knudsen	Skjern Håndbold
2004	(Denmark) Bo Spellerberg	KIF Kolding
2005	(Denmark) Kasper S. Povlsgaard	Bjerringbro-Silkeborg
2006	(Denmark) Lasse Boesen	KIF Kolding
2007	(Denmark) Kasper Søndergaard	KIF Kolding
2008	(Denmark) Heino Holm Knudsen	Team Tvis Holstebro
2009	(Norway) Erlend Mamelund	FCK Håndbold
2010	(Denmark) Jan Nielsen	Århus Håndbold
2011	(Denmark) Mikkel Hansen	AG København
2012	(Denmark) Henrik Møllgaard	Skjern Håndbold
2013	(Denmark) Bo Spellerberg	KIF Kolding København
2014	(Denmark) Lasse Mikkelsen	Skjern Håndbold
2015	(Denmark) Tim Winkler	HC Midtjylland
2016	(Serbia) Tibor Ivanišević	Skjern Håndbold
2017	(Norway) Torbjørn Bergerud	TTH Holstebro
2018	(Sweden) Mikael Aggefors	Aalborg Håndbold
2019	(Denmark) Anders Zachariassen	GOG Håndbold
2020	(Denmark) Mads Hoxer Hangaard	Mors-Thy Håndbold
2021	(Denmark) Emil Madsen	GOG Håndbold
2022	(Denmark) Lukas Jørgensen	GOG Håndbold
2023	(Sweden) Tobias Thulin	GOG Håndbold
2024	(Denmark) Thomas Arnoldsen	Aalborg Håndbold
2025	(Denmark) Niklas Landin	Aalborg Håndbold
