= Aarhus Håndbold =

Danish handball club

- Full name: Aarhus Håndbold
- Founded: 2001; 25 years ago (Under the Name Aarhus GF)
- Dissolved: 2021
- Arena: Ceres Arena
- Capacity: 5,001 (4,394 seats)
- Club colours
Home	Away

Aarhus Håndbold was a handball club from Aarhus, Denmark. The club was founded in 2001 originally under the name Århus GF, as an extension of the traditional Aarhus clubs AGF, Brabrand IF, VRI and Århus KFUM/YMCA / Hasle. AGF chose in 2010 to withdraw from the superstructure, and the club was renamed from AGF Håndbold to Aarhus Håndbold. The home arena of Aarhus Håndbold was Ceres Arena.

The club struggled in the last year of its existence with economic problems and in April 2021 the club was declared bankrupt. In connection with this all the players from Aarhus Håndbold were released and Århus Håndbold merged with the neighbors from Skanderborg Håndbold under the name Skanderborg Aarhus Håndbold. In June 2023 AGF re-entered the project and bought 50% of the shares in the club, and the club was renamed Skanderborg AGF Håndbold.

Their best result in the league was a 2nd place in 2004/2005. In 2013 they won the Danish Super Cup.

== Team ==
=== Current squad ===
Squad for the 2025–26 season

Goalkeepers
Left Wingers
Right Wingers
Line players

Left Backs
Central Backs
Right Backs

=== Transfers ===
Transfers for the 2026–27 season

Joining

Leaving

- (Denmark) Mads-Peter Lønborg (RB) to (Denmark) Mors-Thy Håndbold
- (Denmark) Simon Skovhus (CB) to (Denmark) Aalborg Håndbold

== Seasons ==
Seasons.	League Position	Playoff	Notes
2001/2002	8		
2002/2003	5		
2003/2004	7		
2004/2005	2	2	
2005/2006	6		
2006/2007	5		
2007/2008	2	3	
2008/2009	9		
2009/2010	10		
2010/2011	4	Winners Playoff	#4/4
2011/2012	8	Winners playoff	#3/4
2012/2013	6	Winners playoff	#3/4
2013/2014	7	Winners playoff	#4/4
2014/2015	8	Winners playoff	#4/4
2015/2016	3	Winners playoff	#4/4
2016/2017	9		
2017/2018	8	Winners playoff	#4/4
2018/2019	7	Winners playoff	#4/4
2019/2020	10		
2020/2021	12		

== European Handball ==
=== EHF Champions League ===
Season	Round	Club	Home	Away	Aggregate	Comment
2005–06	Group	(Iceland) Haukar Hafnarfjördur	28–27	34–21	62–48	-
2005–06	Group	(Italy) Torggler Group Meran	28–35	31–37	59–72	-
2005–06	Group	(Slovenia) RK Gorenje Velenje	28–27	27–25	55–52	-
2005–06	1/8 finals	(Hungary) MKB Veszprém KC	21–30	28–31	49–61	-

=== EHF Cup ===
Season	Round	Club	Home	Away	Aggregate	Comment
2003–04	2nd round	(Estonia) HC Kehra	38–27	34–24	70–51	
2003–04	3rd round	(Portugal) Boavista FC	39–24	36–25	75–49	-
2003–04	1/8 finals	(Russia) Lukoil-Dynamo Astrakhan	30–31	39–25	55–70	-
2007–08	2nd round	(Czech Republic) HC Dukla Praha	38–29	38–33	76–62	-
2007–08	3rd round	(Germany) TBV Lemgo	32–33	29–30	61–63	-
2008–09	3rd round	(Italy) A.S.D. Pallamano Conversano	39–30	23–26	62–56	-
2008–09	1/8 finals	(Spain) JD Arrate	21–27	25–20	46–47	-
2013–14	3rd round	(North Macedonia) HC Zomimak	29–26	24–33	59–53	-

=== Cup Winners Cup ===
Season	Round	Club	Home	Away	Aggregate	Comment
2011–12	3rd round	(Slovakia) MŠK Hlohovec	34–34	31–21	65–55	-
2011–12	1/16 finals	(Slovenia) HC Celje Pivovarna Lasko	22–23	24–26	46–49	-

== Notable former players ==
- (Iceland) Robert Gunnarsson
- (Denmark) Sturla Ásgeirsson
- (Denmark) Kasper Søndergaard
- (Denmark) Kasper Irming Andersen
- (Denmark) Christoffer Bonde
- (United Kingdom) Christopher McDermott
- (Russia) Dmitry Kuzelev
- (Norway) Vegard Samdahl
- (Estonia) Mikk Pinnonen

== Notable former coaches ==
- (Denmark) Erik Veje Rasmussen

== See also ==
- Aarhus Håndbold (women's handball)
- AGF Håndbold
- Skanderborg AGF Håndbold
