= Håndballstatuetten =

Norwegian Handball award

Håndballstatuetten is a Norwegian Handball award given to Norwegian players who has represented the Norwegian national team. The awardee must have played at least 200 matches and played at least 60% of matches in a 6-year period. It is awarded after the player has retired.

The award was first awarded in 1998.

== Receivers ==
Year	Awardee
2021	Ida Alstad
2000	Bjørg Andersen
2021	Kjerstin Andersen
2019	Karoline Dyhre Breivang
2013	Fredrik Brubakken
2000	Per Braathen
1999	Sissel Buchholdt
1999	Pål Bye
1999	Arnulf Bæk
2011	Karl Erik Bøhn
2013	Mette Davidsen
2013	Steinar Ege
2013	Marte Eliasson
2021	Ole Erevik
2010	Rune Erland
1999	Grete Werner Evjenth
1999	Karen Fladset
2013	Gunnar Fosseng
1999	Per Otto Furuseth
2011	Ole Gustav Gjekstad
2019	Allan Gjerde
1999	Carl Graff-Wang
2021	Per Graver
2021	Kari Aalvik Grimsbø
2010	Kjersti Grini
2000	Kristen Grislingaas
1999	Arild Gulden
2011	Frode Hagen
2012	Trine Haltvik
2000	Sigrid Halvorsen
2019	Gro Hammerseng-Edin
1999	Inge K. Hansen
2000	Dag Vidar Hanstad
2011	Øystein Havang
2010	Kristine Duvholt Havnås
1998	Hanne Hegh
2010	Tor-Edvin Helland
1998	Hanne Hogness
2000	Astrid Skei Høsøien
1998	Kristin Midthun Ihle
2019	Johnny Jensen
2010	Linn Siri Jensen
2013	Britt Johansen
2018	Kari Mette Johansen
2010	Espen Karlsen
2019	Kristian Kjelling
1999	Kristin Glosimot Kjelsberg
2011	Roger Kjendalen
2000	Oddvar Klepperås
2021	Linn-Kristin Riegelhuth Koren
2013	Hege Kristine Kvitsand
2016	Tonje Larsen
2013	Jan Thomas Lauritzen
2016	Cecilie Leganger
2019	Børge Lund
2021	Kristine Lunde-Borgersen
2021	Tonje Nøstvold Lunde
2013	Kjetil Lundeberg
2013	Else-Marthe Sørlie Lybekk
2021	Erlend Mamelund
2010	Elisabeth Hilmo Meyer
2013	Simen Muffetangen
2000	Gunnar Atle Pettersen
1999	Jon Reinertsen
1999	Cathrine Roll-Matthiesen
1999	Rolf Rustad
1999	Karin Ryen
2021	Geir Aksel Røse
1999	Tonje Sagstuen
1999	Ivar Sandboe
2013	Frode Scheie
1999	Erik Schønfeldt
2013	Morten Schønfeldt
2013	Siri Eftedal Seland
2012	Annette Skotvoll
2000	Turid Smedsgård
2011	Glenn Solberg
2011	Ingrid Steen
1999	Bjørn Steive
2013	Wenche Halvorsen Stensrud
1999	Rune Sterner
2021	Kjetil Strand
2013	Ingunn Strøm
1998	Heidi Sundal
2010	Bent Svele
2001	Kjell Svestad
2010	Heidi Tjugum
1999	Jorunn Tvedt
2019	Håvard Tvedten
1999	Harald Tyrdal
2013	Stian Fredrik Vatne
2013	Preben Vildalen
2013	Jan Wangen
1999	Eldbjørg Willassen
1999	Kari Aagaard
2024	Stine Oftedal
2026	Espen Lie Hansen
2026	Magnus Jøndal
2026	Bjarte Myrhol
