= Rune Erland =

Norwegian handball player (born 1968)

Personal information
- Nationality: Norwegian
- Born: 25 August 1968 (age 58)

Sport
- Sport: Handball
- Position: Back

Senior clubs
- Years: Team
- –1989: Viking HK
- 1989–1994: VfL Gummersbach
- 1994–1996: Viking HK
- 1996–1997: TV Großwallstadt
- 1997–2000: Stavanger IF
- 2001: ThSV Eisenach
National team
Years	Team	Apps	(Gls)
1987–1997	Norway	129	(474)

Teams managed
- –: Haugaland Håndball
- –: Sandnes HK
- –: Stavanger IF

Rune Erland (born 25 August 1968) is a Norwegian handball player. He played 129 matches and scored 474 goals for the Norway men's national handball team between 1987 and 1997. He participated at the 1993 World Men's Handball Championship, where Norway finished 13th.

With his club Viking HK, Erland was national champion in 1988 and 1994. Playing for VfL Gummersbach, he was part of winning the Handball-Bundesliga in 1991. He also played for TV Großwallstadt, Stavanger IF and ThSV Eisenach.

After retiring from playing he became the coach at Haugaland Håndball, and later Stavanger IF og Sandnes HK. While coaching Stavanger in 2005 he made a short comeback as a player at the age of 36, as he thought the team lacked experience in defense.

Erland was awarded the Håndballstatuetten trophy from the Norwegian Handball Federation in 2010.

== Private ==
His son Sturle Erland was also a handball player.
