= Bent Svele =

Norwegian handball player and coach (born 1962)

Personal information
- Nationality: Norwegian
- Born: 26 February 1962 (age 64)

Sport
- Sport: Handball

Senior clubs
- Years: Team
- –: Holmestrand IF
- –: Nøtterøy IF
- –: CD Cajamadrid
- –: Málaga
- –: Kristiansands IF
- ?1985–1992?: IF Urædd
National team
Years	Team	Apps	(Gls)
1983–1989	Norway	116	(343)

Teams managed
- –: Stavanger IF

Bent Svele (born 26 February 1962) is a Norwegian former handball player, coach and sports reporter.

== Biography ==
Born on 26 February 1962, Svele represented the club IF Urædd, with which he won the Norwegian league in 1985, 1988 and 1992, and the Norwegian cup in 1987. He was selected player of the year in the Norwegian league in 1984, 1988 and 1992. During his career, he also played for the clubs Holmestrand IF, Nøtterøy IF, CD Cajamadrid, Málaga and Kristiansands IF, and he coached the club Stavanger IF. He made his debut on the Norwegian national team in 1983, and played 116 matches and scored 343 goals for the national team between 1983 and 1989.

Svele has been sports commentator for the television channel TV 2 Norway since 2000, covering handball events as expert along with reporter Harald Bredeli. He also commented Gladiatorerna together with Mini Jakobsen.

== Awards ==
Svele was awarded the Håndballstatuetten trophy from the Norwegian Handball Federation in 2010.
