= Linn Siri Jensen =

Norwegian handball player and coach (born 1961)

Personal information
- Nationality: Norwegian
- Born: 18 January 1961 (age 65) Bergen, Norway

Sport
- Sport: Handball
- Position: Goalkeeper

Youth career
- Years: Team
- –: Fyllingen IL

Senior clubs
- Years: Team
- 1979–1993: IL Vestar
National team
Years	Team	Apps	(Gls)
1979–1987	Norway	122	(0)

Teams managed
- –: IL Vestar
- –: Refstad-Veitvet IL
- –: Vestli
Medal record
Representing Norway
Women's handball
World championship
Bronze medal – third place	1986 Netherlands	Team

Linn Siri Jensen (born 18 January 1961) is a Norwegian team handball goalkeeper and coach.

She played 122 matches for the national team. She won a bronze medal at the 1986 World Women's Handball Championship in the Netherlands. Clubs include Fyllingen IL and IL Vestar.

Jensen was awarded the Håndballstatuetten trophy from the Norwegian Handball Federation in 2010.
