= Kjetil Lundeberg =

Norwegian handball player

Personal information
- Nationality: Norwegian
- Born: 1966 (age 59–60) Porsgrunn, Norway

Sport
- Sport: Handball
- Position: Pivot

Senior clubs
- Years: Team
- –1991: IF Urædd
- 1991–1995: Runar
- –: IF Fram
- –: Helgerød
National team
Years	Team	Apps	(Gls)
1988–1994	Norway	112	(102)

Teams managed
- 2008–2018: Norway beach

Kjetil Lundeberg (born 1966) is a Norwegian handball player.

He made his debut on the Norwegian national team in 1988, and played 112 matches for the national team between 1988 and 1994. He participated at the 1993 World Men's Handball Championship. Lundeberg was awarded the Håndballstatuetten trophy from the Norwegian Handball Federation in 2013.

== Handball career ==
He played for IF Urædd until 1991, where he won both the Norwegian Championship and Cup twice. He then joined Runar Håndball, where he played for 4 seasons. Here he won one additional Norwegian Championship and 2 Cups. He later played for IF Fram and Helgerød.

== Post-playing career ==
After his playing days he has worked as head of sports in Larvik Municipality, as sporting director at Fram Håndball and as facility councelor at the Norwegian Handball Federation. He has previously been the coach of the Norway men's national beach handball team, where he coached the team at the 2013 European Beach Handball Championship in Randers, Denmark.

== Private ==
His brother, Olav Lundeberg, is also a former handball player.
