= Britt Johansen =

Norwegian handball player

Personal information
- Nationality: Norwegian
- Born: Stord Municipality, Norway

Sport
- Sport: Handball
- Position: Pivot

Senior clubs
- Years: Team
- 1973-1988: Sverresborg IF
- 1988-?: Nidelv IL
National team
Years	Team	Apps	(Gls)
1978–1985	Norway	156	(140)

Britt Johansen (born in 1954 in Stord Municipality, Norway) is a Norwegian handball player. She played 156 matches for the Norway women's national handball team from 1978 to 1985. She participated at the 1982 World Women's Handball Championship, where the Norwegian team placed seventh.

She played for Norwegian club Sverresborg IF from 1973 to 1988. In that time she was one of the key players on a team that won three Norwegian cup finals and a single Norwegian league in 1985-86.

Johansen was awarded the Håndballstatuetten trophy from the Norwegian Handball Federation in 2013.
