= Thomas Drange =

Norwegian handball player (born 1986)

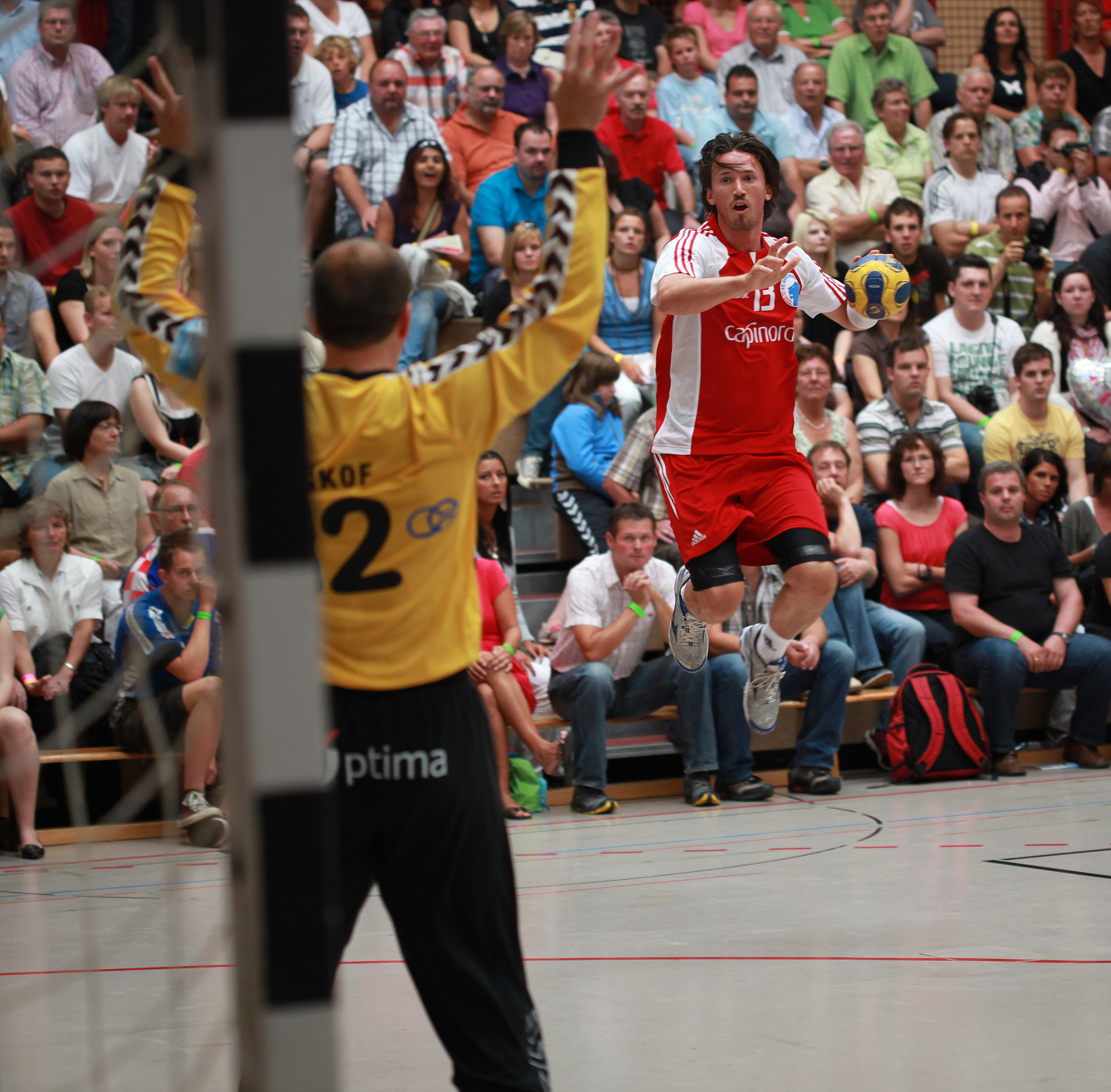
- Drange in 2009

Personal information
- Full name: William Otto Aar
- Nationality: Norwegian
- Born: February 22, 1986 (age 40) Stavanger, Norway
- Height: 1.92 m (6 ft 4 in)

Sport
- Sport: Handball
- Position: Right back
- Current club: retired

Senior clubs
- Years: Team
- 2002-2006: Stavanger Håndball
- 2006-2009: Fyllingen Håndball
- 2009–2010: FCK Håndbold (Denmark)
- 2010-2011: Dunkerque HBGL (France)
- 2011-2012: Toledo BM (Spain)
National team
Years	Team	Apps	(Gls)
2006	Norway	37	(56)

Thomas Hanasand Drange (born February 22, 1986) is a former Norwegian handball player. During his career he played for Viking Stavanger HK and Fyllingen in Norway, FCK Håndbold in Denmark, Dunkerque HBGL in France and Toledo BM in Spain.

He started his club career in Stavanger IF, before he moved to Fyllingen in 2006. His first international club would be FCK Håndbold in Denmark, where he won the Danish handball cup in 2010. After a season in Denmark he moved to Dunkerque, where he won the French cup in 2011/2012. After a year in France he moved to Spain and Toledo BM. In 2012 he ended his career to focus on his studies; economics and management.

He made his debut on the Norwegian national team in 2006.
