= Glenn Solberg =

Norwegian handball player and coach (born 1972)

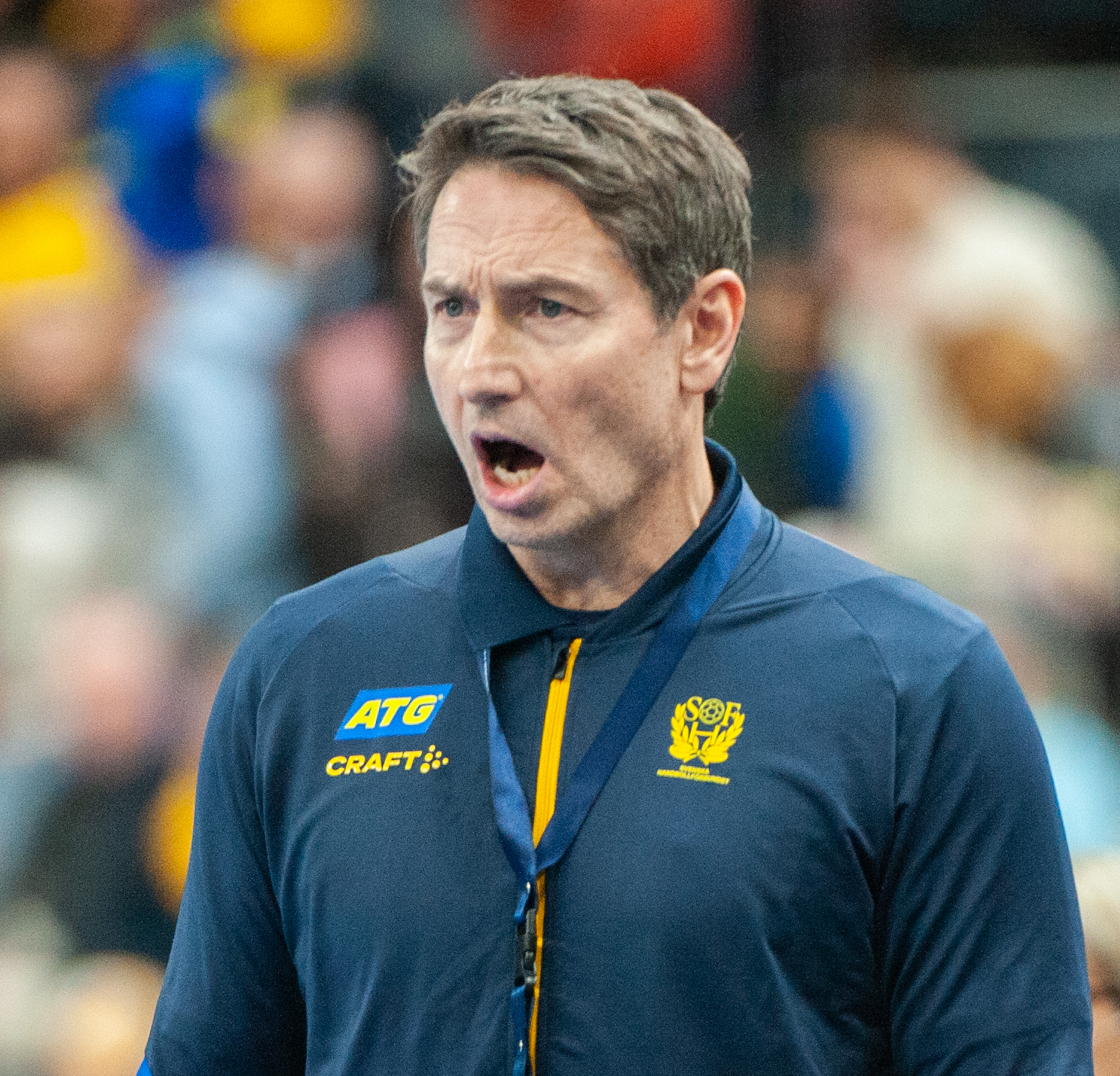
- Solberg with Sweden at the 2023 World Men's Handball Championship

Personal information
- Nationality: Norwegian
- Born: 18 February 1972 (age 54) Drammen, Norway
- Height: 1.89 m (6 ft 2 in)

Sport
- Sport: Handball
- Position: Centre Back

Senior clubs
- Years: Team
- 1983–1992: Reistadt IL
- 1992–1997: Drammen HK
- 1997–2002: HSG Nordhorn
- 2002–2004: FC Barcelona
- 2004–2006: SG Flensburg-Handewitt
- 2006–2010: Drammen HK
National team
Years	Team	Apps	(Gls)
1994–2008	Norway	122	(250)

Teams managed
- 2014–2016: Norway (assistant coach)
- 2015–2019: St. Hallvard HK
- 2023–2024: Fjellhammer IL (assistant coach)
- 2020–2024: Sweden
Medal record
Head Coach for Sweden
World Championship
Silver medal – second place	2021 Egypt
European Championship
Gold medal – first place	2022 Hungary/Slovakia
Bronze medal – third place	2024 Germany

Glenn Solberg (born 18 February 1972) is a Norwegian handball coach and former player. He is regarded as one of the best Norwegian handball players of all time and won fourteen titles during his career playing for clubs in Norway, Germany and Spain. He was previously the head coach of the Swedish men's national handball team, with whom he won the 2022 European Championship, placed second at the 2021 World Championship and finished third at the 2024 European Championship. Solberg was capped 122 times and scored 250 goals for the Norwegian national team. He was awarded the Håndballstatuetten trophy from the Norwegian Handball Federation in 2011.

== Club career ==
Solberg began his professional handball career at Reistadt IL in the early 1980s. In 1992, Reistadt and IF Sturla merged their senior teams to create the club Drammen HK. With the new club, Solberg won the EHF City Cup in 1996 and the Norwegian Championship the following year. In 1997, he moved to German club HSG Nordhorn, where he helped the team secure a promotion to the Bundesliga in 1999. Solberg joined FC Barcelona in 2002 and won the EHF Cup, EHF Supercup, Spanish Championship, Spanish Cup and Spanish Super Cup during a two-year spell with the club.

Solberg transferred to German club SG Flensburg-Handewitt in 2004 and won the German Cup the following year. In 2006, he returned to Drammen and won the Norwegian Championship in 2007 and 2008, and the Norwegian Cup in 2008. Solberg retired after the 2007–08 season, but following an injury crisis at Drammen in November 2009, he returned to the club and retired a second time in 2010 after winning a fourth Norwegian league title.

== International career ==
Solberg made his debut for the Norwegian national team in 1994. He made 122 appearances and scored 250 goals before retiring from the national team in 2008. He represented Norway at the World Championship in 1997 and 2005, captaining the team during the latter, and the 2008 European Championship.

== Coaching career ==
In 2014, Solberg became the assistant coach for the Norway men's national handball team. The following year, he signed a three-year contract as head coach for the Norwegian handball club St. Hallvard HK. In 2016, Solberg terminated his contract with the national team to focus on St. Hallvard following their promotion to the Norwegian premiership. From 2018 to 2019, he was a part of the coaching staff at SG Flensburg-Handewitt.

In 2020, Solberg became the head coach of the Swedish men's national handball team. He led the team to a second-place finish at the 2021 World Championship and placed fifth at the 2020 Summer Olympics. Solberg won the 2022 European Championship with the Swedish national team. He became the assistant coach for the Norwegian club Fjellhammer IL in 2023. Solberg and the Swedish national team placed third at the 2024 European Championship and seventh at the 2024 Summer Olympics. He left the national team in September 2024.

== Honours ==
=== Player ===
Drammen HK

- EHF City Cup: 1996
- Norwegian Championship: 1997, 2007, 2008, 2010
- Norwegian Cup: 2008

HSG Nordhorn

- 2. Handball-Bundesliga: 1999

FC Barcelona

- EHF Cup: 2003
- EHF Supercup: 2003
- Liga ASOBAL: 2003
- Copa del Rey: 2004
- Supercopa ASOBAL: 2004
- Pyrenees League: 2003

SG Flensburg-Handewitt

- DHB-Pokal: 2005

=== Manager ===
Sweden

- World Men's Handball Championship:
  - Silver: 2021
- European Men's Handball Championship:
  - Gold: 2022
  - Bronze: 2024
