= Gunnar Pettersen =

Norwegian handball player and coach (born 1955)

Gunnar Atle Pettersen
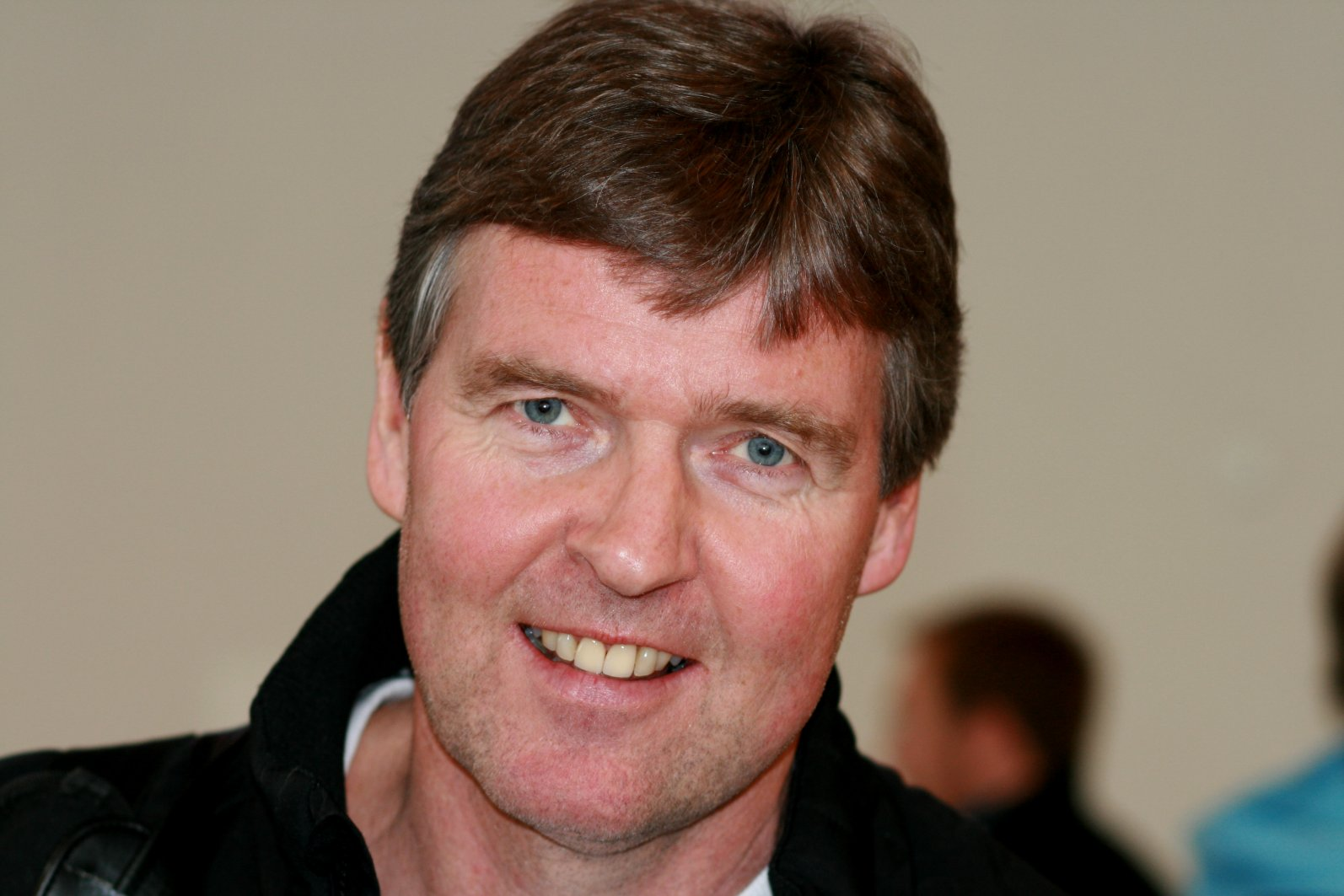
- Gunnar Pettersen, 2008

Personal information
- Born: 30 July 1955 (age 71) Moss, Norway

Sport
- Sport: Handball
National team
Years	Team	Apps	(Gls)
1978–1987	Norway	132	(445)

Teams managed
- Years: Team
- 1989–1994: Norway
- 1994–1996: Larvik HK
- 2001–2008: Norway

Gunnar Atle Pettersen (born 30 July 1955) is a Norwegian former team handball player and a former head coach of the Norwegian national team.

He was awarded the trophy Håndballstatuetten in 2000, and Gullknappen in 2009.

== Personal life and education ==
Pettersen was born in Moss on 30 July 1955.

He received his education from the Norwegian School of Sport Sciences.

== Playing career ==
Pettersen played for various clubs, including Herulf IL, Kolbotn IL, Fredensborg/Ski HK, Skiens BK, and Sandefjord HK. He won the Norwegian Men's Handball Cup with Fredensborg/Ski in 1981 and 1982. He was top scorer in the Norwegian top league Eliteserien five seasons, and was named player of the year in 1982.

He played 132 matches and scored 445 goals for the Norway men's national handball team between 1978 and 1987.

== Coaching career ==
He coached the national team from 1989 to 1994, and again from 2001 to 2008. His best international achievements are the 7th place at the 2005 World Men's Handball Championship and the 6th place at the 2008 European Championships. After securing Norway a place in the 2009 World Championship, he announced that he would not continue as the national team head coach when his contract ran out on 13 October 2008.

=== 2008 European Championships ===
Pettersen's team won preliminary group B of the 2008 European Men's Handball Championship and qualified for the main group after beating later champions Denmark, Russia, and Montenegro. After tying later silver medalists Croatia in their last match in the main group, the team missed the semifinals.

== Awards ==
In 2000 Pettersen was awarded the trophy Håndballstatuetten from the Norwegian Handball Federation, and in 2009 he received NHF's highest award, Gullknappen.
