= Astrid Skei Høsøien =

Norwegian handball player

Personal information
- Nationality: Norwegian
- Born: February 12, 1943 (age 83) Skogn, Norway

Sport
- Sport: Handball
National team
| Years | Team | Apps | (Gls) |
| 1962–1971 | Norway | 81 | (29) |

Astrid Skei Høsøien is a Norwegian handball player. She played 81 matches for the Norway women's national handball team between 1962 and 1971. She participated at the 1971 World Women's Handball Championship, where the Norwegian team placed 7th.

She was awarded the Håndballstatuetten trophy from the Norwegian Handball Federation in 2000.
