= Grethe Werner =

Norwegian sportswoman (1928–2014)

Grethe Werner Evjenth
Personal information
- Full name: Grethe Irene Werner (-Evjenth)
- Nationality: Norwegian
- Born: 28 May 1928 Oslo, Norway
- Died: 30 October 2014 (aged 86) Oslo

Sport
- Sport: Handball

Senior clubs
- Years: Team
- –: Grefsen IL (handball); Oslo TF (gymnastics); Torshaug IF (track and field)
National team
Years	Team	Apps
1946–1960	Norway	35

Grethe Werner (28 May 1928 – 30 October 2014) was a Norwegian sportswoman, a pioneer in women's sport in Norway, active in handball, gymnastics and track and field athletics. She was born in Oslo, and was married to Olaf Evjenth. She represented the clubs Grefsen IL (handball), Oslo Turnforening (gymnastics), and Torshaug IF (track and field).

== Career ==
Werner played 35 matches for the Norwegian women's national handball team between 1946 and 1960, including the very first handball match for the Norwegian national team, against Sweden at Bislett Stadium in front of 9.000 spectators in September 1946. She represented the handball club Grefsen IL, with which she won the national cup six times, (five times the outdoor cup, and once the indoor cup).

She competed in gymnastics at the 1952 Summer Olympics in Helsinki.

In track and field athletics, she was Norwegian champion in shot put in 1948 and 1953, and in discus throw in 1949. She also competed in javelin throw, swing-ball throw, long jump, and in athletics triathlon. She held the Norwegian record in shot put.

She was awarded the trophy Håndballstatuetten from the Norwegian Handball Federation in 1999.

She died in Oslo on 30 October 2014.
