= Lars Olav Olaussen =

Norwegian handball player

Personal information
- Nationality: Norwegian
- Born: June 15, 1977 (age 49) Vestby, Norway
- Height: 193 cm (76 in)

Sport
- Sport: Handball
- Position: Goalkeeper

Youth career
- Years: Team
- –: Vestby HK
- –: Follo HK

Senior clubs
- Years: Team
- 1997–2007: Drammen HK
- 2007–2009: Hammarby IF
- 2009–?: Drammen HK
National team
Years	Team	Apps	(Gls)
2000-2007	Norway	51	(0)

Lars Olav Olaussen is a Norwegian handball player.

He made his debut on the Norwegian national team in 2000, and played 51 matches for the national team between 2000 and 2007. He competed at the 2007 World Men's Handball Championship, where Norway finished 13th. Throughout most of his career, Olaussen was the third choice keeper for Norway behind Steinar Ege and Ole Erevik.
