= Eldbjørg =

Eldbjørg is a given name. Notable people with the given name include:

- Eldbjørg Hemsing (born 1990), Norwegian violinist
- Eldbjørg Løwer (born 1943), Norwegian politician
- Eldbjørg Raknes (born 1970), Norwegian jazz vocalist
- Eldbjørg Willassen, Norwegian handball player
