= Fredrik Brubakken =

Norwegian handball player

Personal information
- Nationality: Norwegian

Sport
- Sport: Handball
National team
Years	Team	Apps	(Gls)
1986–1994	Norway	111	(3)

Fredrik Brubakken is a Norwegian handball player.

He made his debut on the Norwegian national team in 1986, and played 111 matches for the national team between 1986 and 1994. He participated at the 1993 World Men's Handball Championship.

Brubakken was awarded the Håndballstatuetten trophy from the Norwegian Handball Federation in 2013.
