= Ivar Sandboe =

Norwegian handball player

Personal information
- Nationality: Norwegian
- Born: April 10, 1930
- Died: July 1, 2010 (aged 80)

Sport
- Sport: Handball

Senior clubs
- Years: Team
- –: Nordstrand IF
National team
Years	Team	Apps	(Gls)
1951–1958	Norway	26	(49)

Ivar Sandboe (10 April 1930 - 1 July 2010) was a Norwegian handball player.

He made his debut on the Norwegian national team in 1951, and played 26 matches for the national team between 1951 and 1958. He participated at the 1958 World Men's Handball Championship.

Sandboe was awarded the Håndballstatuetten trophy from the Norwegian Handball Federation in 1999.

He played for Nordstrand IF, where he was an honorary member.
