= Kristin Glosimot Kjelsberg =

Norwegian handball player (born 1959)

Personal information
- Nationality: Norwegian
- Born: 7 November 1959 (age 66)

Sport
- Sport: Handball

Senior clubs
- Years: Team
- –: Bækkelagets SK
National team
Years	Team	Apps	(Gls)
1978–1983	Norway	112	(371)

Kristin Glosimot Kjelsberg (born 7 November 1959) is a Norwegian handball player. She played 112 matches and scored 371 goals for the Norwegian national team between 1978 and 1983. She represented the club Bækkelagets SK in 1984, when Bækkelaget became Norwegian champions, and Glosimot was the Eliteserien's top scorer that year. She participated at the 1982 World Women's Handball Championship, where the Norwegian team placed seventh.

Kjelsberg was awarded the Håndballstatuetten trophy from the Norwegian Handball Federation in 1999.
