= Jan Thomas Lauritzen =

Norwegian handball player (born 1974)

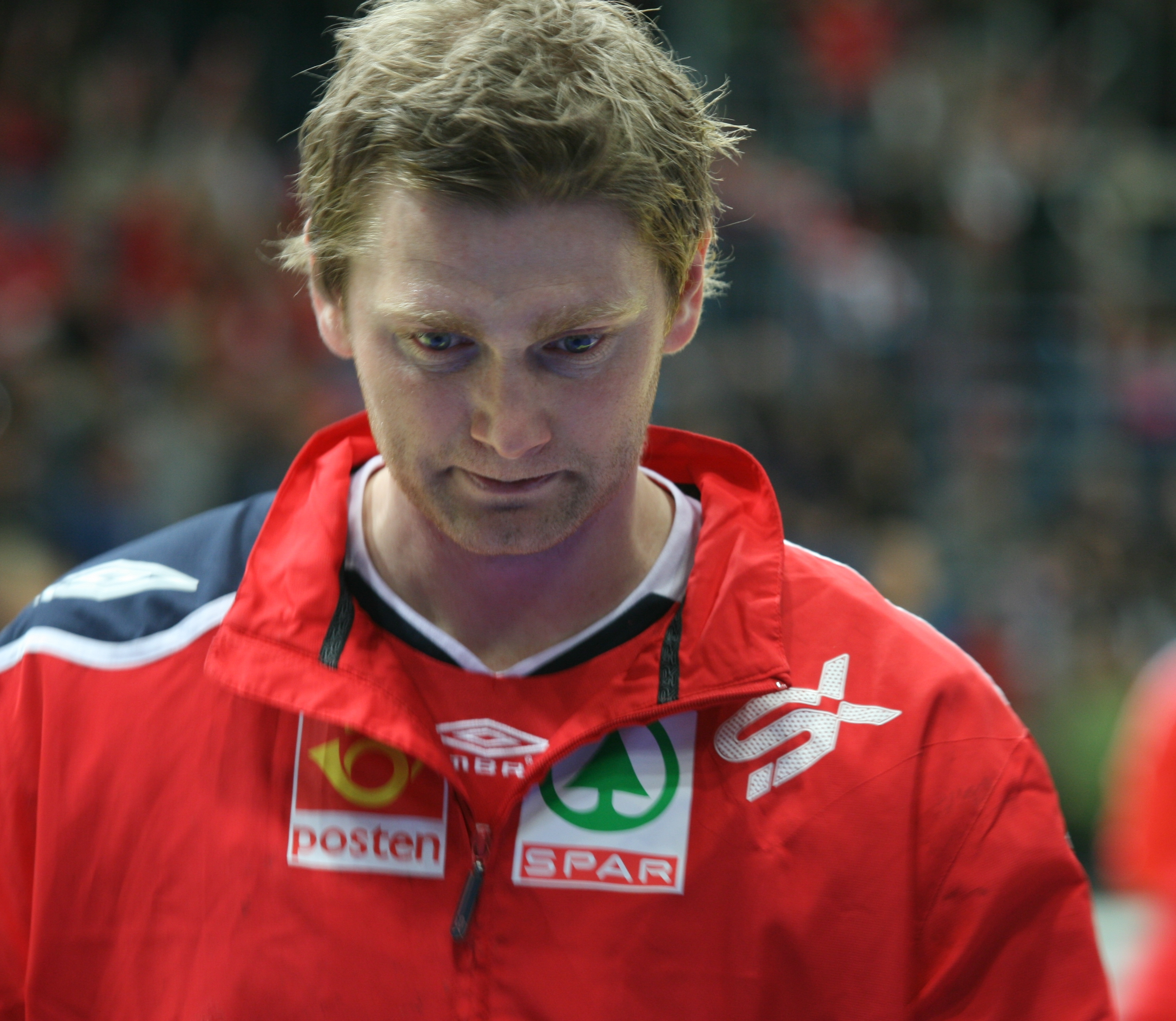

Personal information
- Nationality: Norwegian
- Born: February 6, 1974 (age 52) Sarpsborg
- Height: 192 cm (76 in)

Sport
- Sport: Handball
- Position: Right back / Right wing

Senior clubs
- Years: Team
- 1995–2000: Viking Stavanger
- 2000–2004: TUSEM Essen
- 2004–2005: TuS Nettelstedt-Lübbecke
- 2005–2007: SG Flensburg Handewitt
- 2007–2009: Bjerringbro-Silkeborg
- 2009–2011: Tistedalen TIF
- 2011–2014: Halden Topphåndball
National team
Years	Team	Apps	(Gls)
1993–2008	Norway	254	(557)

Teams managed
- 2016–: Halden Topphåndball

Jan Thomas Lauritzen (born February 6, 1974) is a former Norwegian handball player. He played 254 matches and scored 557 goals for the Norway men's national handball team between 1993 and 2008. He participated at the 1997, 1999, 2001, 2005 and 2007 World Men's Handball Championship and has participated multiple time in the EHF Cup, the Challenge Cup, and the EHF Champions League. Until 2011 he had the record for most matches on the Norwegian national team, until he was overtaken by Steiner Ege and later Bjarte Myrhol.

Lauritzen was awarded the Håndballstatuetten trophy from the Norwegian Handball Federation in 2013.
