= Jan-Richard Lislerud Hansen =

Norwegian handball player (born 1983)

Personal information
- Nationality: Norwegian
- Born: 16 January 1983 (age 43) Drammen, Norway
- Height: 181 cm (71 in)

Sport
- Sport: Handball
- Position: Left wing
- Current club: Retired

Senior clubs
- Years: Team
- –2008: Drammen HK
- 2008–2009: HSG Nordhorn-Lingen
- 2009–2014: Drammen HK
National team
Years	Team	Apps	(Gls)
2004-2010	Norway	32	(55)

Jan-Richard Lislerud Hansen is a Norwegian handball player.

He made his debut on the Norwegian national team in 2004, and played 32 matches for the national team between 2004 and 2010. He competed at the 2007 World Men's Handball Championship.
