= Mats Fransson =

Swedish handball player (born 1962)

Personal information
- Nationality: Swedish
- Born: 1 June 1962 (age 64) Lysekil, Sweden
- Height: 1.87 m (6 ft 2 in)

Sport
- Sport: Handball
- Position: Goalkeeper
- Current club: Retired

Senior clubs
- Years: Team
- 1977-1981: Lysekils HK
- 1981-1982: IK Heim
- 1982-1988: GF Kroppskultur
- 1988-1990: Irsta HF
- 1990-1992: Lysekils HK
- 1992-1998: Runar Sandefjord
- 1999-2002: HF Orust
- 2002-2005: Sandefjord TIF
- 2005-2007: Runar Sandefjord
- 2007-2012: HK Herulf
National team
Years	Team	Apps
1984-1997	Sweden	96
Medal record
World Championship
Gold medal – first place	1990 Czechoslovakia

Mats Fransson (born 1 June 1962 in Lysekil, Sweden) is a Swedish former handball goalkeeper who won the 1990 World Men's Handball Championship and competed in the 1988 Summer Olympics.

== Career ==
Fransson debuted for the senior team at his hometown club Lysekils HK at the age of 15. In 1981 he was enrolled in the Swedish military at Älvsborgs kustartilleriregemente, and therefore he played a single season at IK Heim. Here he won the Swedish Championship. He then moved back to Lysekil and joined the Uddevalla based club GF Kroppskultur. Here he debuted for the national team in 1984.

Later he joined Irsta HF in Västerås. With Irsta HF he played in two Swedish cup finals, but lost both. While at the club he won the 1990 World Championship. He has descripted these seasons as his best. In 1990 he returned to Lysekils HK for 2 years, before moving to Norway to join Runar Sandefjord. Here he played for 7 years, before stopping his professional career and joining HF Orust back in Sweden. In 1997 he played his last match for the Swedish national team. In 2002 he did however return to top handball to join Sandefjord TIF for three years. Afterwards he returned to Runar to play 2 more years.

His last club was HK Herluf, based in Moss. In 2012 he finally retired at the age of 49.
