= Randi Gustad =

Norwegian handball player (born 1977)

Personal information
- Nationality: Norwegian
- Born: 2 May 1977 (age 49) Oslo, Norway
- Height: 170 cm (67 in)

Sport
- Sport: Handball
- Position: Pivot

Senior clubs
- Years: Team
- 1996–1997: Refstad-Veitvet IL
- 1997–2008: Nordstrand IF
National team
Years	Team	Apps	(Gls)
2004–2005	Norway	50	(53)
Medal record
European Championship
Gold medal – first place	2004 Hungary

Randi Heggemsnes Gustad (born 2 May 1977) is a Norwegian lawyer, sports executive, and former team handball player. She played for the club Nordstrand IF and for the Norwegian national team.

Her achievements include winning national titles with her club, and a gold medal with the national team at the European Women's Handball Championship. Since 2025, she has been president of the Norwegian Handball Federation.

== Early and personal life ==
Gustad was born on 2 May 1977, a daughter of business executive Kåre Gustad.

She graduated in jurisprudence from the University of Oslo in 2003.

== Sports career ==
=== Club career ===
Gustad played handball for the clubs Refstad-Veitvet IL and Nordstrand IF. With Nordstrand she won the Norwegian Cup in 2002 and the Norwegian league in 2004, and further participated in the Women's EHF Cup and the EHF Women's Champions League. In the 2001 EHF Women's Cup Winners' Cup Nordstrand reached the final, which they lost to Motor Zaporizhzhia (UKR), having defeated Elda Prestigio (ESP) in the quarter final, and ES Besançon (FRA) in the semi final.

=== International career ===
She played 50 matches and scored 53 goals for the Norwegian national handball team between 2004 and 2005. She participated at the 2004 European Women's Handball Championship, where the team a won gold medal, after winning the semi final against Hungary and the final against Denmark. She also participated at the 2005 World Women's Handball Championship, where the team finished ninth.

She also played 26 matches (scoring 47 goals) for the Norwegian junior team, as well as 17 matches (scoring 45 goals) for the Norwegian youth team.

=== Post-playing career ===
Outside of sports, she is a jurist. She lives in Oslo.

Gustad has been board member of the foundation Anti-Doping Norway. She has also worked as an expert commentator for the Norwegian television channel TV 2.

In May 2025 she was elected the new president of the Norwegian Handball Federation, succeeding Kåre Geir Lio.

== Achievements ==
- European Championship:
  - Winner: 2004
- EHF Cup Winners' Cup:
  - Finalist: 2001
- Norwegian League
  - Gold Medalist: 2003/2004
  - Silver Medalist: 2001/2002, 2002/2003
- Norwegian Cup:
  - Winner: 2002
  - Finalist: 2000, 2001, 2003, 2004
