= Tor Bjørn Andersen =

Norwegian handball player

Personal information
- Nationality: Norwegian
- Born: October 2, 1973 (age 53) Stord, Norway

Sport
- Sport: Handball

Senior clubs
- Years: Team
- –1993: Stord IL
- 1993–2001: Viking Stavanger HK
National team
Years	Team	Apps	(Gls)
1995–1999	Norway	14	(38)

Tor Bjørn Andersen (born 2 October 1973) is a Norwegian former handball player.

He made his debut on the Norwegian national team in 1995, and played 14 matches for the national team between 1995 and 1999. He competed at the 1999 World Men's Handball Championship.

At club level he played for Viking Stavanger HK and Stord IL. With Viking he won both the Norwegian Championship and Cup. He retired from handball in 2001, aged only 27 due to a shoulder injury.
