= Gøran Sørheim =

Norwegian handball player (born 1990)

Personal information
- Nationality: Norwegian
- Born: 4 June 1990 (age 36) Tranby, Norway
- Height: 1.83 m (6 ft 0 in)

Sport
- Sport: Handball
- Position: Centre back

Senior clubs
- Years: Team
- 2006–2014: Drammen HK
- 2014–2017: SønderjyskE Håndbold
- 2017–2023: Drammen HK
National team
Years	Team	Apps	(Gls)
2012–2018	Norway	53	(39)

Gøran Sørheim (born 4 June 1990) is a Norwegian former handball player who last played for Drammen HK and formerly the Norwegian national team.
