= Endre Nordli =

Norwegian handball player

Personal information
- Nationality: Norwegian
- Born: March 14, 1974 (age 52) Oslo, Norway

Sport
- Sport: Handball
- Position: Goalkeeper
- Current club: Retired

Senior clubs
- Years: Team
- 1995-2004: Runar Sandefjord
National team
Years	Team	Apps	(Gls)
1999	Norway	11	(0)

Endre Nordli (born 14 March 1974) is a Norwegian handball player.

He made his debut on the Norwegian national team in 1999, and played 11 matches for the national team. He competed at the 1999 World Men's Handball Championship, where Norway reached the round of 16, where they were knocked out by Sweden.

He played for Runar Sandefjord, where he won both the Norwegian Championship and Cup twice.
