= Christoffer Rambo =

Norwegian handball player (born 1989)

Personal information
- Nationality: Norwegian
- Born: 18 November 1989 (age 36) Sandefjord, Norway
- Height: 1.99 m (6 ft 6 in)

Sport
- Sport: Handball
- Position: Right back
- Current club: Runar Sandefjord

Youth career
- Years: Team
- 2002-??: Sandefjord TIF
- ??-2008: Runar Sandefjord

Senior clubs
- Years: Team
- 2008-2010: Runar Sandefjord
- 2010-2011: BM Valladolid
- 2011-2012: Elverum Håndball
- 2012-2013: Dunkerque HGL
- 2013-2021: GWD Minden
- 2021-: Runar Sandefjord
National team
Years	Team	Apps	(Gls)
2009–	Norway	101	(218)
- Updated on 12 August 2024

Christoffer Rambo (born 18 November 1989) is a Norwegian handball player for Runar Sandefjord, where he also started his career. He has also featured in the Norwegian national team.

== Career ==
Rambo started playing handball at the age of 12. He started at Sandefjord TIF, but his senior debut would be at Runar Sandefjord. In 2010 he joined Spanish team BM Valladolid. A year later he returned to Norway and joined Elverum Håndball on a two year deal. In his first season he won the Norwegian championship and was top scorer in the Postenligaen with 143 goals. After a season in Norway he joined French side Dunkerque HGL, but in November 2013 he was released of his contract. He when joined GWD Minden in Germany.

In the summer of 2021 he returned to Norway and Runar Sandefjord. In his first season he scored the second most goals in the league with 163.

He debuted for the Norwegian national team at the 2009 World Men's Handball Championship in Croatia, in a match against Denmark. Norway would finish 9th in the tournament.
