= Runar Sandefjord (handball) =

Norwegian handball club

- Full name: Idrettslaget Runar Sandefjord
- Short name: Runar
- Founded: 1949; 77 years ago
- Arena: Runarhallen, Sandefjord
- President: Jørn-Magne Johannessen
- Head coach: Bjarte Myrhol
- League: REMA 1000-ligaen
- Club colours

Runar Sandefjord is the men's handball department of IL Runar, club from Sandefjord, Norway. They compete in REMA 1000-ligaen, which is the highest league for men's handball clubs in Norway.

The club was relegated from the first league in 2006–07 season, but they soon returned to the first league again. Runar won the highest league in the seasons 1993–94, 1994–95, 1995–96 and 1999–00. They also won the Limburgse Handbal Dagen in 1998, where they defeated Sporting Toulouse 31 with 29–28 in the final.

Location of Runar Sandefjord

== Crest, colours, supporters ==
=== Kits ===
HOME

2013–14

== Team ==
=== Current squad ===
Squad for the 2025–26 season

Runar Sandefjord

Goalkeepers

- 1 (Norway) Mats Bjørnstad
- 12 (Norway) Sivert Jonson Tryggestad
- 25 (Norway) Oliver Klavenes
- 47 (Denmark) Viktor Tofthøj Warrer

Left Wingers

- 8 (Norway) Preben Gram
- 14 (Norway) Even Haugli

Right Wingers

- 13 (Norway) Kasper Bjanes Iversen
- 20 (Norway) Adam Tenvik Bergli

Line Players

- 5 (Norway) Håkon Økern
- 23 (Norway) Sander Rogne Myklebust
- 55 (Norway) Alexander Løke Gautestad

Left Backs

- 2 (Sweden) Daniel Blomgren
- 7 (Norway) Lars Eivind Gurrich
- 21 (Norway) Magnus Aasvestad
- 22 (Sweden) Tobias Rivesjö
- 29 (Norway) Thomas Boilesen

Central Backs

- 10 (Norway) Herman Solberg
- 17 (Norway) Emil Hofstad Eriksen
- 18 (Norway) Ola Viskum
- 33 (Norway) Tord Lea Knutsen

Right Backs

- 9 (Norway) Christoffer Rambo
- 19 (Norway) Christian Seierstad

=== Technical staff ===
- Head coach: (Norway) Bjarte Myrhol
- Assistant coach: (Norway) Einar Veierød
- Assistant coach: (Denmark) Kennie Juncker Boysen
- Physiotherapist: (Denmark) Ufuk Ömer Sahin
- Physiotherapist: (Norway) Svein Strøm Pedersen

=== Transfers ===
Transfers for the 2026–27 season

Joining

- (Sweden) Gustav Jönne (LP) from (Sweden) Alingsås HK

Leaving

- (Germany) Phil Döhler (GK) to (Sweden) Amo Handboll
- (Norway) Sivert Jonson Tryggestad (GK) to (Norway) ØIF Arendal
- (Norway) Lars Eivind Gurrich (LB) to (Norway) ØIF Arendal

=== Transfer History ===
Transfers for the 2025–26 season

Joining

- (Sweden) Daniel Blomgren (LB) from (Germany) HBW Balingen-Weilstetten
- (Denmark) Viktor Tofthøj Warrer (GK) from (Norway) Follo Håndballklubb
- (Norway) Thomas Boilesen (LB) from (Denmark) Nordsjælland Håndbold
- (Norway) Kasper Bjanes Iversen (RW) from (Norway) Haslum HK
- (Norway) Even Haugli (LW) from (Norway) Haslum HK
- (Norway) Herman Solberg (CB) from (Norway) Haslum HK
- (Norway) Alexander Løke Gautestad (LP) from (Norway) ØIF Arendal

Leaving

- (Sweden) Martin Lindell (LB) to (Denmark) Nordsjælland Håndbold
- (Norway) Kasper Haugen Furu (CB) to (Germany) TuS N-Lübbecke
- (Norway) Kasper Sjursen Syversen (LP) to (Denmark) Ribe-Esbjerg HH

Transfers for the 2024–25 season

Joining

- (Norway) Sivert Jonson Tryggestad (GK)
- (Norway) Håkon Økern (LP)
- (Norway) Magnus Aasvestad (LB)

Leaving

- (Denmark) Kennie Juncker Boysen (LB) (retires)
- (Norway) Øyvind Varpe (GK)
- (Norway) Trym Kristian Bjåland-Tonning (LP)

Transfers for the 2023–24 season

Joining

- (Denmark) Frederik Fuglsang Torp (GK) from (Sweden) Önnereds HK

Leaving

- (Norway) André Pung Tuzov (LB) to (Sweden) Lugi HF

Transfers for the 2022–23 season

Joining

- (Sweden) Anton Hellberg (GK) from (France) Nancy Handball

Leaving

Transfers for the 2021–22 season

Joining

- (Norway) Christoffer Rambo (RB) from (Germany) GWD Minden

Leaving

== Accomplishments ==
- Norwegian League:
  - Gold (4): 1994, 1995, 1996, 2000
  - Silver (3): 1990, 2002, 2008
  - Bronze (11): 1991, 1993, 1998, 1999, 2001, 2003, 2010, 2022, 2023, 2024, 2025
- Norwegian Cup:
  - Gold (5): 1993, 1996, 1998, 2009, 2025
  - Silver (6): 1991, 1992, 1997, 2001, 2003, 2005

== EHF ranking ==
As of 22/10/2026

Rank	Team	Points
42	(Germany) VfL Gummersbach	113
43	(France) Limoges Handball	109
44	(Serbia) Vojvodina Novi Sad	108
45	(Norway) Runar Sandefjord	106
46	(France) Fenix Toulouse	95
47	(North Macedonia) RK Alkaloid	94
48	(Finland) BK-46	93

== Former club members ==
=== Notable former players ===
==== Goalkeepers ====
- (Norway) Endre Nordli (1995–2003)
- (Sweden) Mats Fransson (1992–1998, 2005–2007)
- (Sweden) Jan Stankiewicz (1997–1999)

==== Right wingers ====
- (Sweden) Sebastian Lindell (2008–2009, 2011–2016)

==== Left wingers ====
- (Norway) Ståle Berg Aspestrand
- (Norway) Ole Magnus Ekelund (1997–2003)
- (Norway) Bjørn Vidar Eriksen
- (Norway) Geir Erlandsen

==== Line players ====
- (Norway) Einar Riegelhuth Koren (2002–2006)
- (Norway) Frank Løke (1998–2003, 2016)
- (Norway) Kjetil Lundeberg (1991–1995)
- (Norway) Stein Olaf Sando (2002–2004)

==== Left backs ====
- (Norway) André Jørgensen (2000–2003)
- (Norway) Tormod Moldestad (1991–1998, 1999–2000, 2003–2005)
- (Norway) Roger Kjendalen (1991–1994, 2002–2008)
- (Greece) Spyros Balomenos (2010–2011)

==== Central backs ====
- (Norway) Kristian Hansen (1991–2004)
- (Norway) Mario Matic (2012–2014)
- (Norway) Trym Bilov-Olsen

==== Right backs ====
- (Norway) Marius Hovde Andersen
- (Norway) Vidar Gjesdal (1997–1999)
- (Norway) Pål Vidar Lundquist
- (Norway) Svend Magnus Pettersen
- (Norway) Christoffer Rambo (2007–2010, 2021–)
