= Viking HK =

Norwegian handball club

Viking Handball Klubb
- Full name: Viking Handball Klubb
- Short name: Viking HK
- Founded: 21 May 1986
- Arena: Hetlandshallen
- CEO: Line Foss
- Head coach: Christian Magnus Mikalsen Johannesen
- League: 2nd Division for Men
Home	Away

Viking Handball Klubb (founded 1986) is a Norwegian handball team from Stavanger with 1 series gold and 4 NM gold. The team has blue jerseys and blue shorts, and is trained by Christian Magnus Mikalsen Johannesen. The team plays their home matches in Hetlandshallen.

== History ==
The same year the club was founded, a concrete sporting plan was set up, to move up from the 3rd division to the 1st division (the top division of the time) within 5 years. The team moved up to the 2nd division 1986/1987 season, and were on the rise the following year, but it was missed when they lost the qualification against Kristiansand with 1 goal.

After winning the 2nd division season 1988/1989, it was clear for the top series. The same season the team also played for the NM finals where the opponent became the arch rival Stavanger Idrettsforening. Viking Handball klubb won the match 21-17 ahead of 5 000 spectators.

== Series and end games in Norway ==
Viking Handball has won the series once (the 1997/1998 season), they have 2 silver, and won the NM 4 times (the seasons 1987/1988, 1993/1994, 1996/1997 and 2000/2001).

== Participation international ==
Best position internationally came when the team reached the semi-finals of the EHF Cup Winners' Cup in the 1997/98 season. Led by Christian Berge and Jan Thomas Lauritzen, losses 46-51 were combined against Caja Cantabria Santander Spain who won the Cup Winner Cup that year (Total 51–39 over HSG Dutenhofen / Münchholzhausen Germany ). Otherwise, Viking has reached the quarterfinals of the EHF Cup and participated in the Champions League.

== Merging ==
The club has always been independent, but on 17 February 2000 the club entered into a collaboration with Stavanger IF on elite efforts. The teams formed Stavanger Handball and took the logo of Viking Handball Klubb.

This collaboration came about in an attempt to reach the top of Norwegian handball and stay there. The collaboration began in the youth department, via junior teams, and up to the senior departments. The clubs were still independent, but after the 2008/2009 season (which ended in relegation), it was called to an extraordinary annual meeting 14 February 2009, where it was decided that the collaboration should end when Stavanger Idrettsforening wanted to withdraw.

== The years after Stavanger Håndball ==
The first year as "" New "Viking Handball", they won the 1st division over Vålerenga by 4 points, and moved straight up to the elite series again, where it was 6th place on the first try

2010/2011 - Won 1 division, advanced to the elite

2011/2012 - 9th place in the elite

2012/2013 - Last place in the elite

2013/2014 - Relegated to 1st Division handball for men.

2014/2015 - 3rd place 1st division

2015/2016 - Promotion to the elite

2016/2017 - Last in the elite series and relegated again

2017/2018 - Further down to 2 divisions

2018/2019 - Won 2 Division 3 Division and moved directly into 1 Division again

2019/2020 - 2 place 1 division - There is promotion to the elite with 5 games left to play (as of February 24, 2020). They are up to date with points at Fjellhammer 4 points down to third place

== Famous players ==
- (Norway) Ole Erevik (2000–2004)
- (Norway) Tor Bjørn Andersen
- (Norway) Steinar Ege
- (Norway) Thomas Drange
- (Norway) Christian Berge
- (Norway) Jan Thomas Lauritzen
- (Norway) Rune Erland
- (Denmark) Kevin Møller
- (Norway) Gøran Johannessen
- (Norway) Alexander Blonz (2016–2019)
- (Sweden) Magnus Andersson
- (Sweden) Mattias Gustafsson
- Björn van Riessen Stihl (Lidén)
