= Emil Hansson (handballer, born 1996) =

Swedish handball player

Personal information
- Full name: Emil Magnus Hansson
- Nationality: Swedish
- Born: 24 April 1996 (age 30) Kristianstad, Sweden
- Height: 1.81 m (5 ft 11 in)

Sport
- Sport: Handball
- Position: Right Wing
- Current club: Drammen HK

Youth career
- Years: Team
- –2013: Näsby IF
- 2013–2016: IFK Kristianstad

Senior clubs
- Years: Team
- 2013–2016: IFK Kristianstad
- 2016–2019: Eskilstuna Guif
- 2019–2021: OV Helsingborg HK
- 2021–2022: Bergischer HC
- 2022–2023: TIF Viking
- 2023–: Drammen HK

Emil Magnus Hansson (born 24 April 1996) is a Swedish handball player for Drammen HK.

He started playing handball in Näsby IF. 2013 he moved on to IFK Kristianstad, mostly playing for their youth team, but a few a games for the senior team. In the season of 2015/16 he was on an apprentice contract with the senior team, but still only got to play a few games. In 2016 he signed for Eskilstuna Guif. 2019 he changed to OV Helsingborg HK. In 2021 he signed a one-year contract for the German Bergischer HC.

Between 2013 and 2017 he played for the Swedish U19 and U21 national teams, with a total of 62 games and 151 goals.
