= Drammen HK =

Norwegian handball club

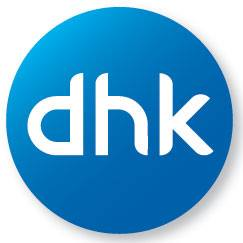
- Full name: Drammen Håndballklubb
- Short name: DHK
- Founded: 1992; 34 years ago
- Arena: Drammenshallen, Drammen
- Capacity: 4,200
- Head coach: Kristian Kjelling
- League: REMA 1000-ligaen
- Club colours
Home	Away

Drammen Håndballklubb is a Norwegian handball team located in Drammen, Norway. They compete in REMA 1000-ligaen, which is the highest league for men's handball clubs in Norway.

Location of Drammen HK

== History ==
The club was founded on March 3, 1992. The foundation was the result of a long going project where handball clubs in Drammen and Lier gathered to discuss how to build a "Top Team" candidate for the region. The project resulted in two clubs joining forces - Reistad IL from Lier and IF Sturla from Drammen. The two clubs transferred their senior players to the new club, but continued as separate entities concentrating on development of children and youngsters. The colors of Drammen HK became blue - the same color as background of the city coat of arms.

Reistad IL was qualified to play in Norway Premier Division, so Drammen really got a flying start starting at the top level. However, Drammen did not make it through and was degraded to the Second Division the year after. However, In 1993 Drammen HK signed the Swedish trainer Kent-Harry Andersson, and returned to the Premier Division after one year. This was the beginning of a series of successes that was crowned in 1996, bringing home the EHF City Cup as the first Norwegian club ever to win a European title. In 1997, the team won the silver medal at the first club world championship, after losing 30-29 to the Spanish team Caja Cantabria in the final. In 2007, the team again reached the finals of European Cup Series No. 3 (Challenge Cup (EHF City Cup), but lost there against the Romanian CS UCM Reșița team. During its history, it won 4 Norwegian League (1997, 2007, 2008, 2010), 2 Norwegian Cup (2008, 2017). Some of the best Norway international players started their senior careers at Drammen HK, such as Glenn Solberg, Frode Hagen and Kristian Kjelling.

== Crest, colours, supporters ==
=== Kits ===
HOME

2019–21

AWAY

2019–21

== Sports Hall information ==
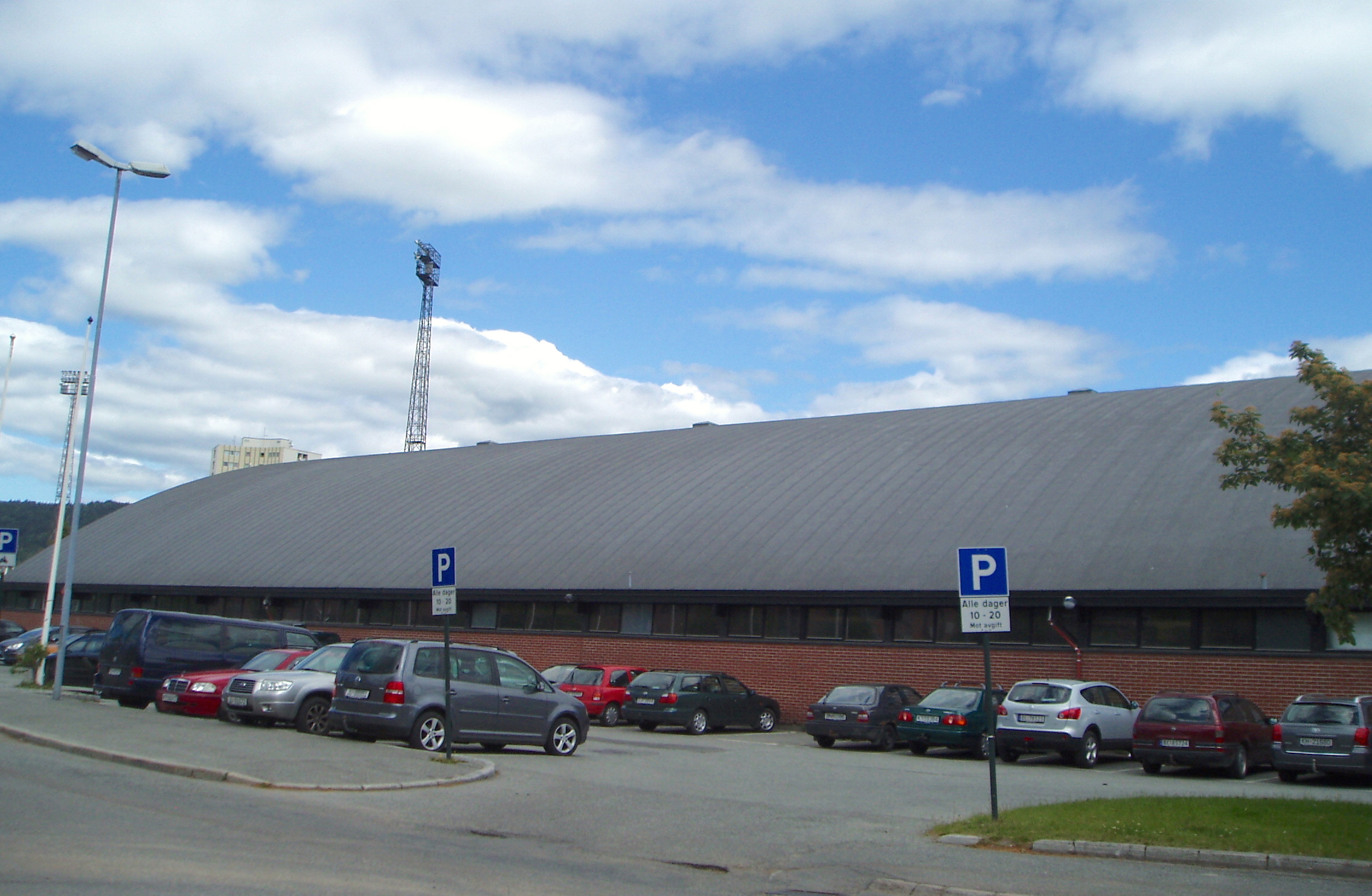
Home hall: Drammenshallen

- Name: – Drammenshallen
- City: – Drammen
- Capacity: – 4200
- Address: – Knoffs gate 18, 3044 Drammen, Norway

== Team ==
=== Current squad ===
Squad for the 2024–25 season

Drammen HK

Goalkeepers

- 12 (Iceland) Ísak Steinsson
- 25 (Norway) Oscar Larsen Syvertsen

Left Wingers

- 10 (Norway) Alexander Westby
- 44 (Norway) Ole-Henry Dahl

Right Wingers

- 31 (Norway) Ola Hoftun Lillelien
- 35 (Sweden) Emil Hansson

Line Players

- 13 (Norway) Simen Vatne Andersen
- 17 (Norway) August Olsen Storbugt
- 23 (Norway) Espen Gommerud Våg

Left Backs

- 19 (Norway) Sondre Ovid Skovli
- 20 (Norway) Trym Korperud Johnsen

Central Backs

- 28 (Norway) August Lind Oma
- 33 (Norway) Tobias Mehren Søberg
- 77 (Norway) Nikolai Nalbant Moe

Right Backs

- 5 (Norway) David Walstad Haugstvedt
- 18 (Norway) Viktor Petersen Norberg

=== Technical staff ===
- Head coach: (Norway) Kristian Kjelling
- Assistant coach: (Norway) Gøran Sørheim
- Goalkeeping coach: (Norway) Mads Fjelddalen
- Physiotherapist: (Norway) Hedda Hajum
- Physiotherapist: (Norway) Marius Jensen Hoel

=== Transfers ===
Transfers for the 2026–27 season

Joining

Leaving

- (Norway) Tobias Mehren Søberg (CB) to (Denmark) Skanderborg AGF Håndbold

=== Transfer History ===
Transfers for the 2025–26 season

Joining

Leaving

- (Sweden) Emil Hansson (RW) to (Sweden) HF Karlskrona
- (Norway) August Olsen Storbugt (LP) to (Denmark) Nordsjælland Håndbold

Transfers for the 2024–25 season

Joining

- (Iceland) Ísak Steinsson (GK)
- (Norway) Espen Gommerud Våg (LP) from (Portugal) Sporting CP
- (Norway) Alexander Westby (LW) from (Sweden) IK Sävehof
- (Norway) Simen Vatne Andersen (LP) from (Norway) TIF Viking

Leaving

- (Sweden) Andreas Björkman-Myhr (GK) to (Switzerland) TSV St. Otmar St. Gallen
- (Iceland) Róbert Sigurðarson (LB) to (Iceland) ÍBV
- (Norway) Kristian Rammel (LP) to (Switzerland) Pfadi Winterthur
- (Norway) Hermann Vildalen (LB) to (Norway) Kristiansands IF
- (Norway) Kristoffer Raastad-Hoel (RW)

== Previous squads ==
2009–2010 Team
Shirt No	Nationality	Player	Birth Date	Position
1	Norway	Mathias Kolstad Holm	26 October 1986 (age 39)	Goalkeeper
5	Norway	Simen Holm	19 June 1989 (age 37)	Right Back
6	Norway	Christian Spanne	22 June 1986 (age 40)	Right Winger
8	Norway	Jan-Richard Lislerud Hansen	16 January 1983 (age 43)	Left Winger
9	Sweden	Marcus Litborn	26 May 1980 (age 46)	Central Back
10	Norway	Bard Kinn Nordhagen	28 November 1982 (age 43)	Right Back
11	Norway	Espen Lie Hansen	1 March 1989 (age 37)	Left Back
12	Norway	Lars Olav Olaussen	15 June 1977 (age 49)	Goalkeeper
13	Norway	Steffen Skancke	12 August 1988 (age 38)	Left Winger
14	Norway	Joakim Hykkerud	10 February 1986 (age 40)	Line Player
15	Norway	Eirik Rolid	8 May 1987 (age 39)	Central Back
16	Denmark	Jonas Degnbol	22 July 1976 (age 50)	Goalkeeper
22	Norway	Gøran Sørheim	4 June 1990 (age 36)	Central Back
23	Norway	Jarle Mörk Pettersen	26 March 1989 (age 37)	Right Winger
24	Norway	Lars Henrik Ulsaker Eriksen	14 October 1990 (age 36)	Line Player
33	Norway	Jan Andre Modalen	23 February 1976 (age 50)	Line Player

2007–2008 Team
Shirt No	Nationality	Player	Birth Date	Position
1	Norway	Mathias Kolstad Holm	26 October 1986 (age 39)	Goalkeeper
2	Norway	Glenn Solberg	18 February 1972 (age 54)	Central Back
3	Norway	Frode Hagen	23 July 1974 (age 52)	Left Back
5	Norway	Olav Hovind	5 July 1984 (age 42)	Central Back
6	Norway	Christian Spanne	22 June 1986 (age 40)	Right Winger
7	Norway	Anders Tverdal	16 June 1988 (age 38)	Left Winger
8	Norway	Jan-Richard Lislerud Hansen	16 January 1983 (age 43)	Left Winger
9	Norway	Vegard Strand Svang	10 January 1986 (age 40)	Line Player
10	Norway	Bard Kinn Nordhagen	28 November 1982 (age 43)	Right Back
11	Norway	Espen Lie Hansen	1 March 1989 (age 37)	Left Back
12	Norway	Simen Hansen	13 March 1981 (age 45)	Goalkeeper
13	Norway	Steffen Skancke	12 August 1988 (age 38)	Left Winger
14	Norway	Joakim Hykkerud	10 February 1986 (age 40)	Line Player
15	Norway	Terje Österhus	4 January 1983 (age 43)	Left Back
16	Norway	Truls Martin Buseth	13 October 1988 (age 38)	Goalkeeper
17	Norway	Marius Hovde Andersen	18 February 1983 (age 43)	Right Back
18	Norway	Eivind Nygard	28 March 1974 (age 52)	Line Player
22	Norway	Gøran Sørheim	4 June 1990 (age 36)	Central Back
27	Bosnia and Herzegovina	Eldin Hajdarevic	29 August 1979 (age 47)	Right Winger

== Accomplishments ==
- EHF City Cup:
  - Gold (1): 1996
  - Silver (1): 2007
- IHF Super Globe:
  - Silver (1): 1997
- Norwegian League:
  - Gold (4): 1997, 2007, 2008, 2010
  - Silver (6): 1995, 2001, 2004, 2006, 2018, 2022
  - Bronze (8): 1996, 2002, 2009, 2011, 2012, 2019, 2020, 2021
- Norwegian Cup:
  - Gold (2): 2008, 2017
  - Silver (4): 1999, 2000, 2010, 2011

== European record ==
=== EHF City Cup ===
Season	Round	Club	Home	Away	Aggregate
1995–96; Winners	1/16	(Georgia (country)) Amirani Tbilisi	37–15	34–21	71–36
1995–96; Winners	1/8	(France) Paris Saint-Germain	21–18	22–22	43–40
1995–96; Winners	Quarter-finals	(Iceland) UMFA Mosfellsbaer	22–14	20–25	42–39
1995–96; Winners	Semi-finals	(Sweden) IFK Skövde	20–12	17–24	37–36
1995–96; Winners	Finals	(Germany) VfL Hameln	27–21	22–21	49–42

=== EHF ranking ===
As of 22/10/2026

Rank	Team	Points
112	(Switzerland) Pfadi Winterthur	40
113	(Italy) SSV Brixen	39
114	(Latvia) ZRHK Tenax Dobele	38
115	(Norway) Drammen HK	38
116	(Poland) Wybrzeże Gdańsk	38
117	(Kosovo) KH Besa Famgas	38
118	(Spain) CB Ademar León	38

== Former club members ==
=== Notable former players ===
==== Goalkeepers ====
- (Norway) Torbjørn Bergerud (2011–2015)
- (Norway) Sander Heieren (2019–2022)
- (Norway) Mathias Kolstad Holm (2003–2020)
- (Norway) Lars Olav Olaussen (1997–2007, 2009–2013)
- (Norway) Frode Scheie (1992–1996)
- (Sweden) Anders Lindqvist (1996–1998)

==== Right wingers ====
- (Norway) Lars Erik Bjørnsen (2011–2014)
- (Norway) Aksel Horgen (2017–2020)
- (Norway) Geir Oustorp (1995–1997, 1999–2007)
- (Norway) Christian Spanne (2006–2011, 2015–2019)

==== Left wingers ====
- (Norway) Ole Magnus Ekelund (2008–2009)
- (Norway) Jan-Richard Lislerud Hansen (2004–2008, 2009–2014)
- (Norway) August Pedersen (2021–2022)
- (Norway) Marius Riise (1994–1998, 2001–2002)
- (Iceland) Bjarki Sigurðsson (1997–1998)

==== Line players ====
- (Norway) Håvard Augensen (2008–2009)
- (Norway) Joakim Hykkerud (2004–2011, 2017–2021)
- (Norway) Henrik Jakobsen (2009–2015)
- (Norway) Frank Løke (2015–2016)
- (Australia) Taip Ramadani (2001–2003)
- (Latvia) Uldis Lībergs

==== Left backs ====
- (Norway) Thomas Boilesen (2016–2020)
- (Norway) Frode Hagen (1992–1997, 2006–2008)
- (Norway) Espen Lie Hansen (2006–2011, 2019–2021)
- (Norway) Johannes Hippe (2015–2019)
- (Norway) Kristian Kjelling (1999–2002, 2015–2016)
- (Norway) Ronald Putans
- (Norway) Hermann Vildalen (2017–2018, 2021–2024)

==== Central backs ====
- (Norway) Roger Kjendalen (2001–2002)
- (Norway) Glenn Solberg (1992–1997, 2006–2010)
- (Norway) Gøran Sørheim (2006–2014, 2017–2023)
- (Norway) Steffen Stegavik (2008–2009)
- (Norway) Stian Tønnesen (1994–1996)
- (Sweden) Jonas Larholm (2019–2020)

==== Right backs ====
- (Norway) Svein-Erik Bjerkrheim
- (United Kingdom) Steven Larsson (2011-2012)
