= Carl E. Wang =

Norwegian politician

Carl Egil Wang (25 May 1930 – 5 February 2016) was a Norwegian politician for the Conservative Party and sports administrator.

Wang, who was born in Skedsmo but represented Østfold, was never elected directly to the Parliament of Norway but served as a deputy representative in the periods 1969–1973 and 1973–1977. During the first term he was brought in as a replacement representative for Svenn Thorkild Stray, who became appointed to the Cabinet in 1970. Wang sat as a regular representative until March 1971, when the cabinet of which Stray was a part was dissolved, allowing him to return to his seat in Parliament.

On the local level Wang was mayor of Moss between 1959 and 1960, where he coached the local football team Moss FK, and a member of Våler municipal council during the terms 1971–1975, 1975–1979 and 1979–1983. During the term 1979–1983 he was also mayor of Østfold county council. He was also the president of the Norwegian Handball Federation from 1972 to 1977.
