= Christian Spanne =

Norwegian handball player (born 1986)

Personal information
- Nationality: Norwegian
- Born: 22 June 1986 (age 40) Drammen, Norway

Sport
- Sport: Handball
- Position: Left wing
- Current club: Drammen HK

Senior clubs
- Years: Team
- –: Drammen HK
- –: Orlen Wisla Plock
- –: Stord HB
- –: Drammen HK
- –: Rival
National team
Years	Team	Apps	(Gls)
2005–2012	Norway	36	(43)

Christian Spanne (born 22 June 1986) is a Norwegian handball player. He played 36 matches for the Norway men's national handball team between 2005 and 2012. He participated at the 2009 World Men's Handball Championship, where the Norwegian team placed 9th.
