= Ole Magnus Ekelund =

Norwegian handball player (born 1980)

Personal information
- Full name: Ole Magnus Ekelund
- Nationality: Norwegian
- Born: 20 April 1980 (age 46)
- Height: 1.77 m (5 ft 10 in)

Sport
- Sport: Handball
- Position: Left winger
- Current club: FCK Håndbold (retired)
- Number: 8

Ole Magnus Ekelund (born 20 April 1980) is a Norwegian former handball player. He played for Danish Handball League side FCK Håndbold and Norwegian sides Runar Sandefjord and Drammen Håndballklubb.
