= Alexander Løke Gautestad =

Norwegian handball player (born 2007)

Personal information
- Nationality: Norwegian
- Born: 13 August 2007 (age 19) Tønsberg, Norway
- Height: 1.97 m (6 ft 6 in)

Sport
- Sport: Handball
- Position: Pivot
- Current club: Runar Sandefjord
- Number: 55

Senior clubs
- Years: Team
- 2023–2024: Runar Sandefjord
- 2024–2025: ØIF Arendal
- 2025–: Runar Sandefjord

Alexander Løke Gautestad (born 13 August 2007) is a Norwegian handball player for Runar Sandefjord and the Norwegian national youth team.

Løke Gaustestad is recognized as one of the most prominent talents in his position, with potential to become an international player.

== Career ==
He represented Norway at the 2025 IHF Men's U19 Handball World Championship, placing 8th.

On 28 December 2025, Løke Gautestad scored the winning penalty goal in the penalty shoot out in the Norwegian cup final for Runar Sandefjord against Kolstad Håndball.

== Personal life ==
His is the son of handball legend Heidi Løke and nephew of Frank Løke.
