= Christian Berge =

Norwegian handball player and coach (born 1973)

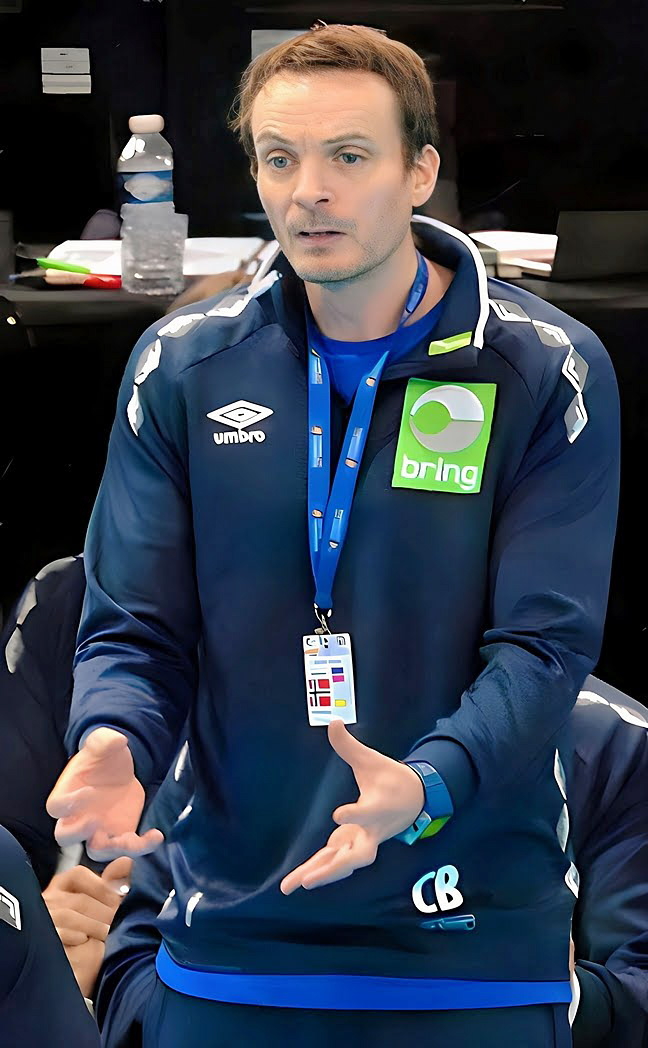
- Berge with the Norwegian national team in 2016

Personal information
- Nationality: Norwegian
- Born: 19 July 1973 (age 53) Trondheim, Norway
- Height: 1.89 m (6 ft 2 in)

Sport
- Sport: Handball
- Position: Centre back
- Current club: Kolstad (manager)

Youth career
- Years: Team
- –: Charlottenlund SK
- –: Trondheim HK

Senior clubs
- Years: Team
- 1995–1999: Viking Stavanger
- 1999–2006: SG Flensburg-Handewitt
- 2007–2008: Aarhus Håndbold
- 2008–2011: Elverum Håndball
National team
Years	Team	Apps	(Gls)
1997–2006	Norway	63	(251)

Teams managed
- 2007–2008: Aarhus Håndbold (assistant coach)
- 2008–2014: Elverum Håndball
- 2014–2022: Norway
- 2022–: Kolstad
Medal record
Head Coach for Norway
World Championship
Silver medal – second place	2017 France
Silver medal – second place	2019 Denmark/Germany
European Championship
Bronze medal – third place	2020 Austria/Norway/Sweden

Christian Berge (born 19 July 1973) is a Norwegian former handball player and current coach of Kolstad Håndball. He won eleven titles at club level playing for teams in Norway and Germany. Berge was previously the coach of the Norwegian national team, with whom he placed second at the World Championship in 2017 and 2019, and third at the 2020 European Championship.

Berge made 63 appearances and scored 251 goals for the Norwegian national team between 1997 and 2006.

== Playing career ==
Berge started playing handball at Charlottenlund SK, and later joined Trondheim HK. In 1995 he made his senior debut for Stavanger HK. In 1999 he joined German team SG Flensburg-Handewitt. Here he won both the DHB-Pokal, Handball-Bundesliga and EHF Cup Winners' Cup.

In October 2004 he was diagnosed with lymphoma and Ménière's disease. He made his comeback on the court in January 2005. In March 2005 he had a setback however, which kept him out until December 2005.

The following summer he concluded that playing in the Bundesliga caused him too much trouble, and he therefore joined Danish team AGF Håndbold. A year later he retired and became a coach at Aarhus GF.

=== National team ===
Berge played 63 matches for the Norwegian Men's National Team. His best result was an 8th placed finish at the 2000 European Men's Handball Championship.

== Coaching career ==
After retiring he was the assistant coach at AGF Håndbold for a season before returning to Norway, where he became the head coach of Elverum Håndball. In his first season he led the team to the Norwegian Cup final, where they lost to IL Runar. In 2012, 2013 and 2014 he won the Norwegian Championship with the club. In 2013 he became the assistant coach to the Norwegian Youth National team in addition to coaching Elverum.

In February 2014 he became the head coach of the Norwegian Men's National Team on an interim contract. From February to November he thus coached both the Norwegian national team and Elverum. In July 2014 he signed a permanent contract as the Norwegian head coach.

He did not manage to qualify the team for the 2015 World Championship, but at the 2016 European Handball Championship he guided the team to the semifinals, where they eventually achieved a 4th place.

At the 2017 and 2019 World Men's Handball Championship he won silver medals at both occations. At the 2020 European Championship he won bronze medals with Norway. These were the only medals, that Norway has won at any major international tournament.

He left the team in February 2022 after finishing 5th at the 2022 European Men's Handball Championship, as he wanted to return to club handball. He did originally have a contract with the Norwegian Handball Federation until 2025, but the federation was willing to let him go.

In March 2022 he became the head coach of the Norwegian club Kolstad IL. With Kolstad he won the Norwegian double in both 2023 and 2024.

== Private ==
In 2008 he published the book I kampens hete – og kreften er ennå ikke overvunnet together with Norwegian journalist Tore Sæther about his life and career with cancer.

== Honours ==
=== Player ===
- Norwegian Championship:
  - Gold: 1998
- Norwegian Cup:
  - Gold: 2010
- German Championship:
  - Gold: 2000, 2003, 2005, 2006
- German Cup:
  - Gold: 2003, 2004, 2005
- German Super Cup:
  - Gold: 2000
- EHF Cup Winners' Cup:
  - Gold: 2001

=== Manager ===
- Norwegian Championship:
  - Gold: 2013, 2023, 2024
- Norwegian Cup:
  - Gold: 2010, 2023, 2024
- World Men's Handball Championship:
  - Silver: 2017, 2019
- European Men's Handball Championship:
  - Bronze: 2020
