= Eldbjørg Willassen =

Norwegian handball player (born c. 1948)

Personal information
- Nationality: Norwegian
- Born: c.1948

Sport
- Sport: Handball
- Position: Goalkeeper
National team
Years	Team	Apps	(Gls)
1965–1971	Norway	60	(0)

Eldbjørg Willassen (born c.1948) is a Norwegian handball goalkeeper. She played 60 matches for the Norway women's national handball team between 1965 and 1971. She participated at the 1971 World Women's Handball Championship, where the Norwegian team placed 7th.

Willassen was awarded the Håndballstatuetten trophy from the Norwegian Handball Federation in 1999.
