= Geir Røse =

Norwegian handball player (born 1948)

Geir Aksel Røse (born 19 April 1948) is a retired Norwegian handball player who competed in the 1972 Summer Olympics.

He was born in Oslo and represented the club Oppsal IF. In 1972 he was part of the Norwegian team which finished ninth in the Olympic tournament. He played three matches and scored one goal.

He received the Håndballstatuetten award in 2021.
