= Joakim Hykkerud =

Norwegian handball player (born 1986)

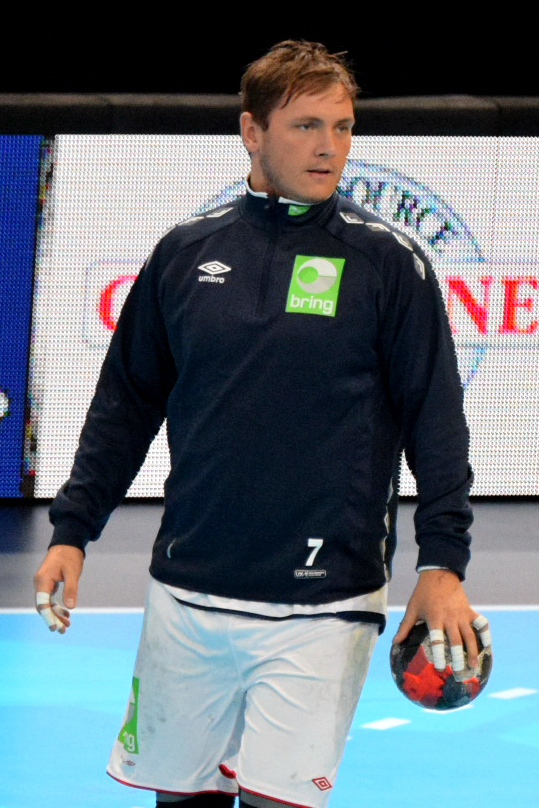
- Hykkerud in 2016

Personal information
- Full name: Joakim André Groth Hykkerud
- Nationality: Norwegian
- Born: 10 February 1986 (age 40) Notodden, Norway
- Height: 1.94 m (6 ft 4 in)

Sport
- Sport: Handball
- Position: Pivot
- Current club: Lemvig-Thyborøn Håndbold

Senior clubs
- Years: Team
- –: Notodden HK
- –2011: Drammen HK
- 2011: IFK Kristianstad
- 2011–2012: Bjerringbro-Silkeborg
- 2012–2017: TSV Hannover-Burgdorf
- 2017—2021: Drammen HK
- 2021: AEK Athens
- 2021–: Lemvig-Thyborøn Håndbold
National team
Years	Team	Apps	(Gls)
2007–2018	Norway	79	(71)
Medal record
World Championship
Silver medal – second place	2017 France

Joakim André Groth Hykkerud (born 10 February 1986) is a Norwegian handball player for Lemvig-Thyborøn Håndbold and the Norwegian national team.

He competed at the 2016 European Men's Handball Championship.

In 2026 he was hired as marketing director of Mjøndalen's football team.
