= Hermann Vildalen =

Norwegian handball player (born 1995)

Personal information
- Full name: Hermann Gabriel Ranneberg Vildalen
- Nationality: Norwegian
- Born: 17 September 1995 (age 31) Kristiansand, Norway
- Height: 2.03 m (6 ft 8 in)

Sport
- Sport: Handball
- Position: Left back
- Current club: Drammen HK
National team
Years	Team	Apps	(Gls)
2018–	Norway	11	(9)

Hermann Vildalen (born 17 September 1995) is a Norwegian handball player for Drammen HK.

He played for Drammen HK and the Norwegian national team.

He is a nephew of former international handballer Preben Vildalen.

He was for 15 years coach for the Konnerud Handball Boys.
