= Steinar Ege =

Norwegian handball player (born 1972)

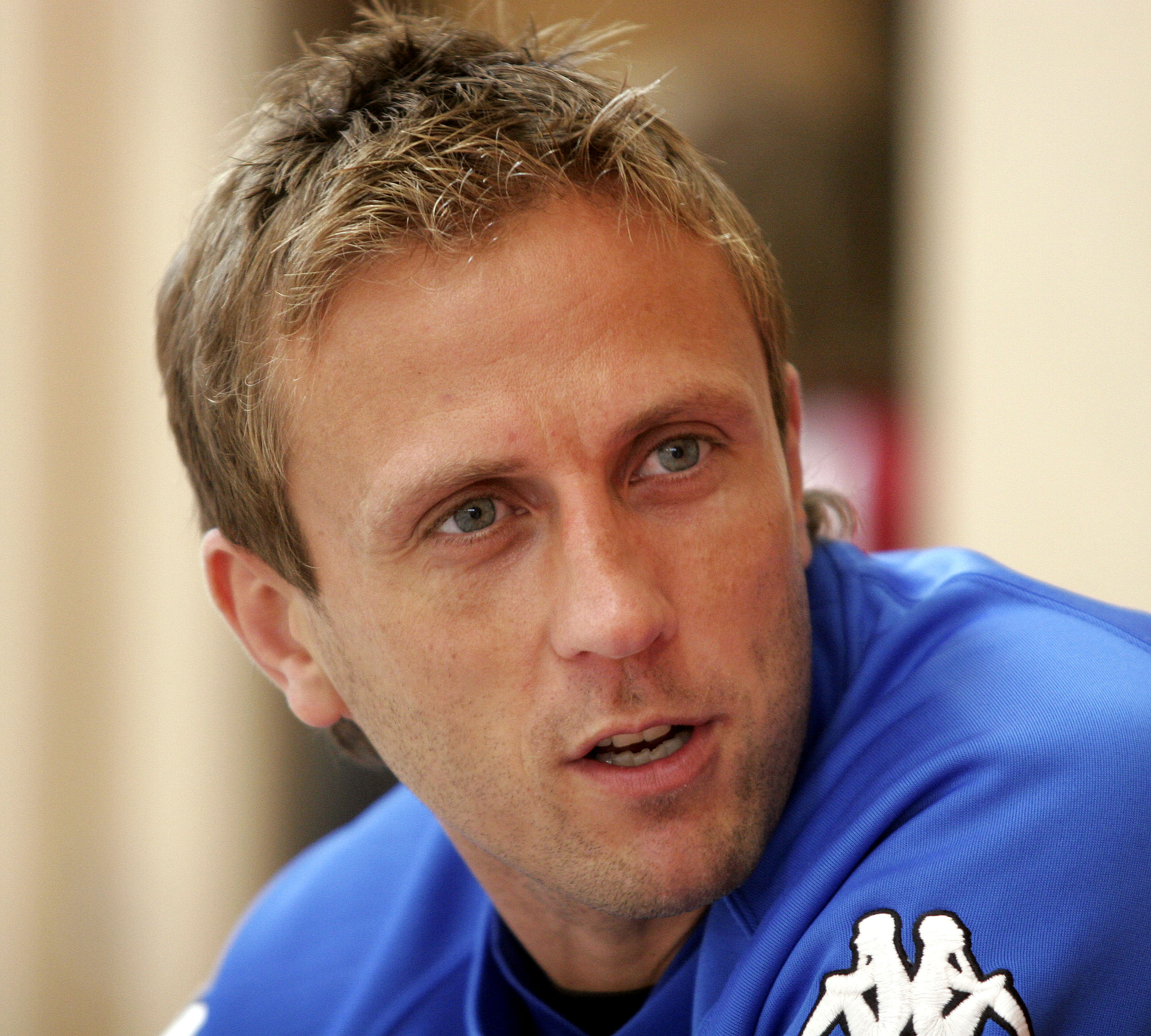
- Ege with FCK Håndbold in 2007

Personal information
- Full name: Steinar Ege
- Nationality: Norwegian
- Born: 10 April 1972 (age 54) Kristiansand, Norway
- Height: 1.94 m (6 ft 4 in)

Sport
- Sport: Handball
- Position: Goalkeeper
- Current club: Retired

Youth career
- Years: Team
- -: Kristiansand IF
- -: Øyestad IF
- Stavanger IF

Senior clubs
- Years: Team
- -1997: Viking HK
- 1997-1999: VfL Gummersbach
- 1999-2002: THW Kiel
- 2002-2003: CBM Galdár
- 2003-2006: VfL Gummersbach
- 2006-2010: FCK Håndbold
- 2010-2012: AG København
- 2015: THW Kiel
National team
Years	Team	Apps	(Gls)
1995-2011	Norway	262	(1)

Teams managed
- 2012-: Norway (GK coach)

Steinar Ege (born 10 April 1972) is a retired Norwegian handballer and handball coach. He last played for Handball-Bundesliga side THW Kiel. Ege was a member of the Norwegian national handball team, which he represented over 250 times during his career.

After his playing career he became a youth coach at the Danish club Frederiksberg IF. Later he became the goalkeeping coach for the Norwegian national team.

== Career ==
In Norway Ege played for Greipstad, Øyestad IF, Kristiansand IF, Stavanger Håndball and Viking HK. He started his professional career in 1997 for German club VfL Gummersbach. In 1999 he moved to THW Kiel. Here he won the German Bundesliga in 2000 and in 2002 and the EHF Cup in 2002. He also reached the final of the EHF Champions League in 2000 with the club. In the 2002/03 season he was loaned out to Spanish club CBM Gáldar. Afterwards he moved back to VfL Gummersbach.

In the 2006 season he switched to Danish club FCK Håndbold. When the club ceased to exist and became AG København he joined them. With the club he won the Danish league 3 times in 2008, 2011 2012. He also won the Danish Cup in 2010. When the club went bankrupt in 2012, he retired. In 2015 he made a short comeback for THW Kiel, where he played from March to June in the 15/16 season. In that season he won the German Bundesliga for a third time.

He debuted for the national team in 1995 against Azerbaijan. In January 2011 he got the record for most matches for the Norwegian national team, taking the record from Jan Thomas Lauritzen. Later the same year he retired from the national team. At the 2021 Olympics he lost the record for most matches on the Norwegian national team to Bjarte Myrhol.

== Private life ==
He is married to Lene Ege, formerly Andersen, who was also a professional handballer. Before he became a professional handballer he worked as a carpenter.
