= Espen Lie Hansen =

Norwegian handball player (born 1989)

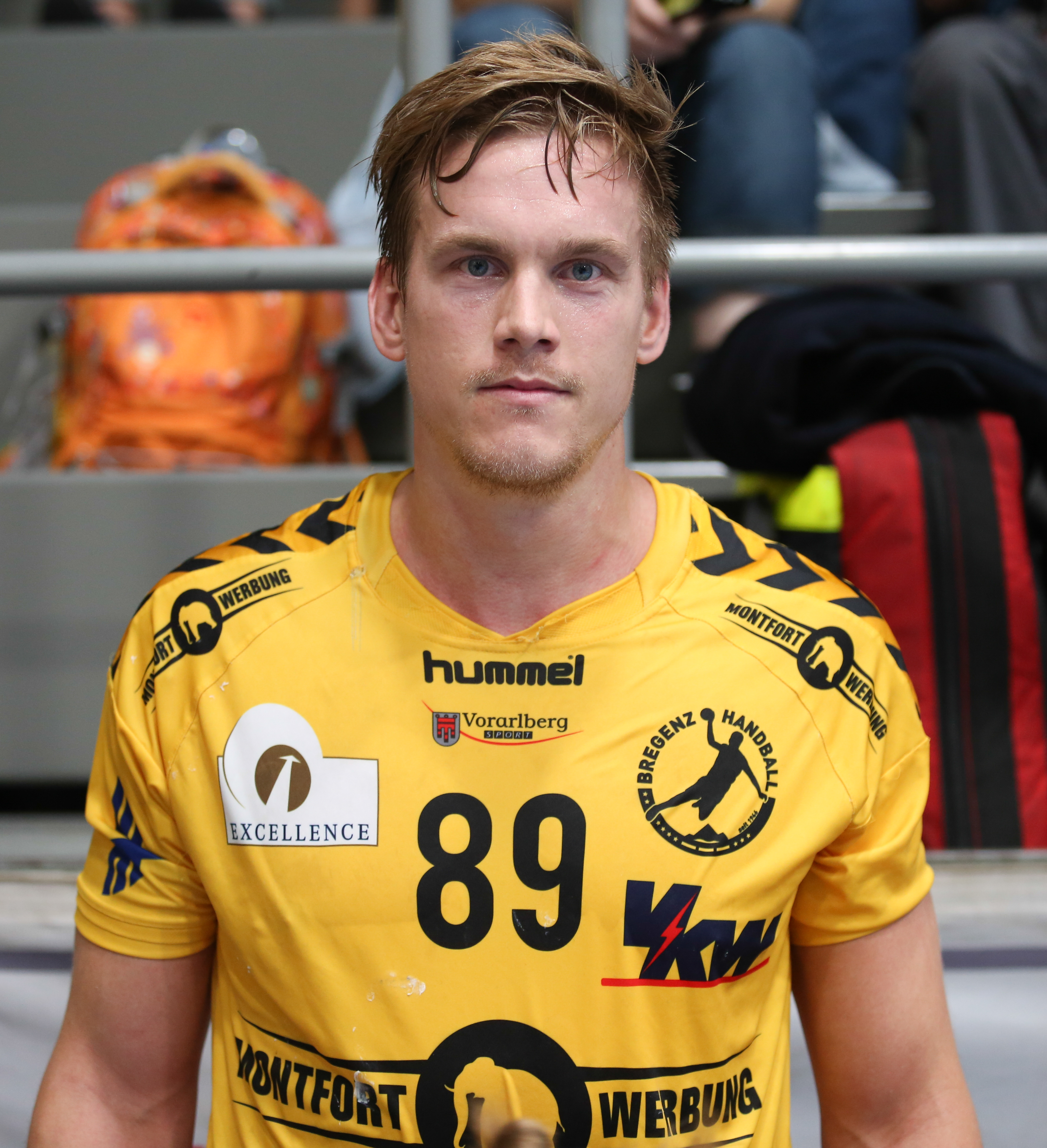

Personal information
- Nationality: Norwegian
- Born: 1 March 1989 (age 37) Drammen, Norway
- Height: 1.96 m (6 ft 5 in)

Sport
- Sport: Handball
- Position: Left back
- Current club: Retired

Senior clubs
- Years: Team
- –: Skoger
- –2011: Drammen HK
- 2011–2012: Bjerringbro-Silkeborg
- 2012–2014: Dunkerque Handball
- 2014–2015: SC Magdeburg
- 2015–2016: A1 Bregenz HB
- 2016–2018: HC Midtjylland
- 2018–2019: HBC Nantes
- 2019–2021: Drammen HK
National team
Years	Team	Apps	(Gls)
2009–2019	Norway	159	(456)
Medal record
World Championship
Silver medal – second place	2017 France
Silver medal – second place	2019 Germany/Denmark

Espen Lie Hansen (born 1 March 1989) is a Norwegian handball player who last played for Drammen HK and formerly the Norwegian national team.

He competed at the 2016 European Men's Handball Championship.

In 2024, Lie Hansen participated in the celebrity game show 99 to Beat Norway, where he finished 3rd out of 56 contestants.

== Gallery ==
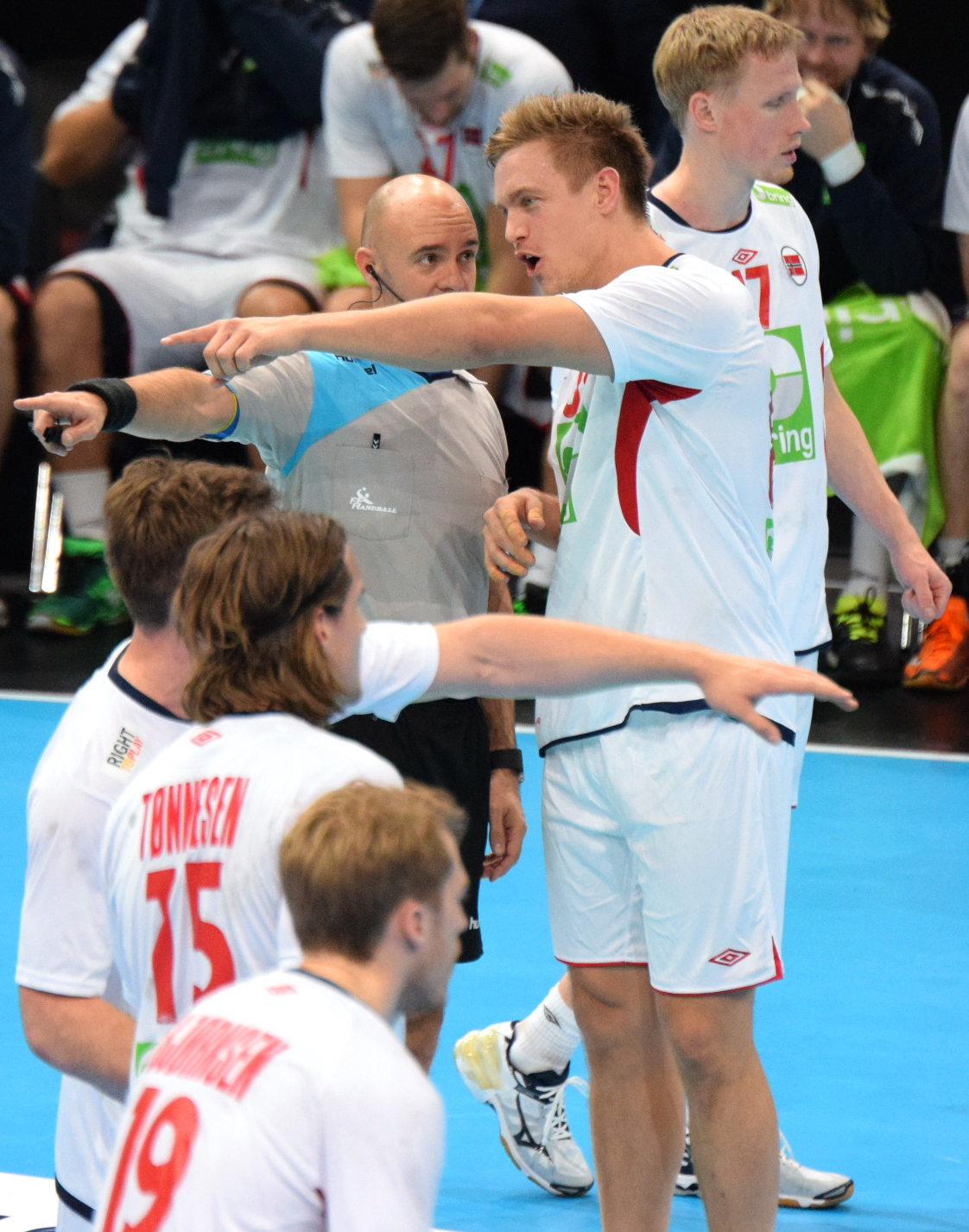

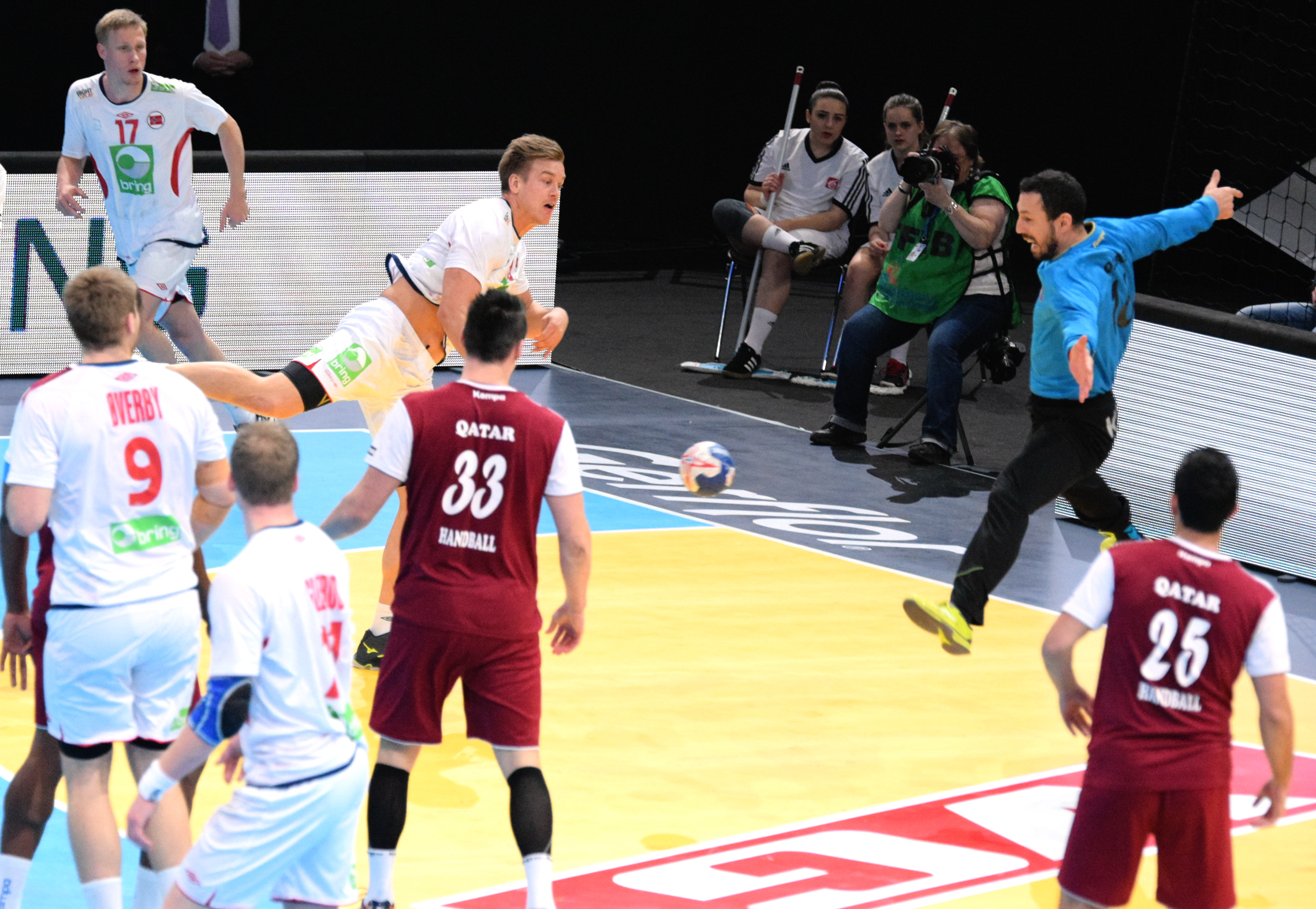

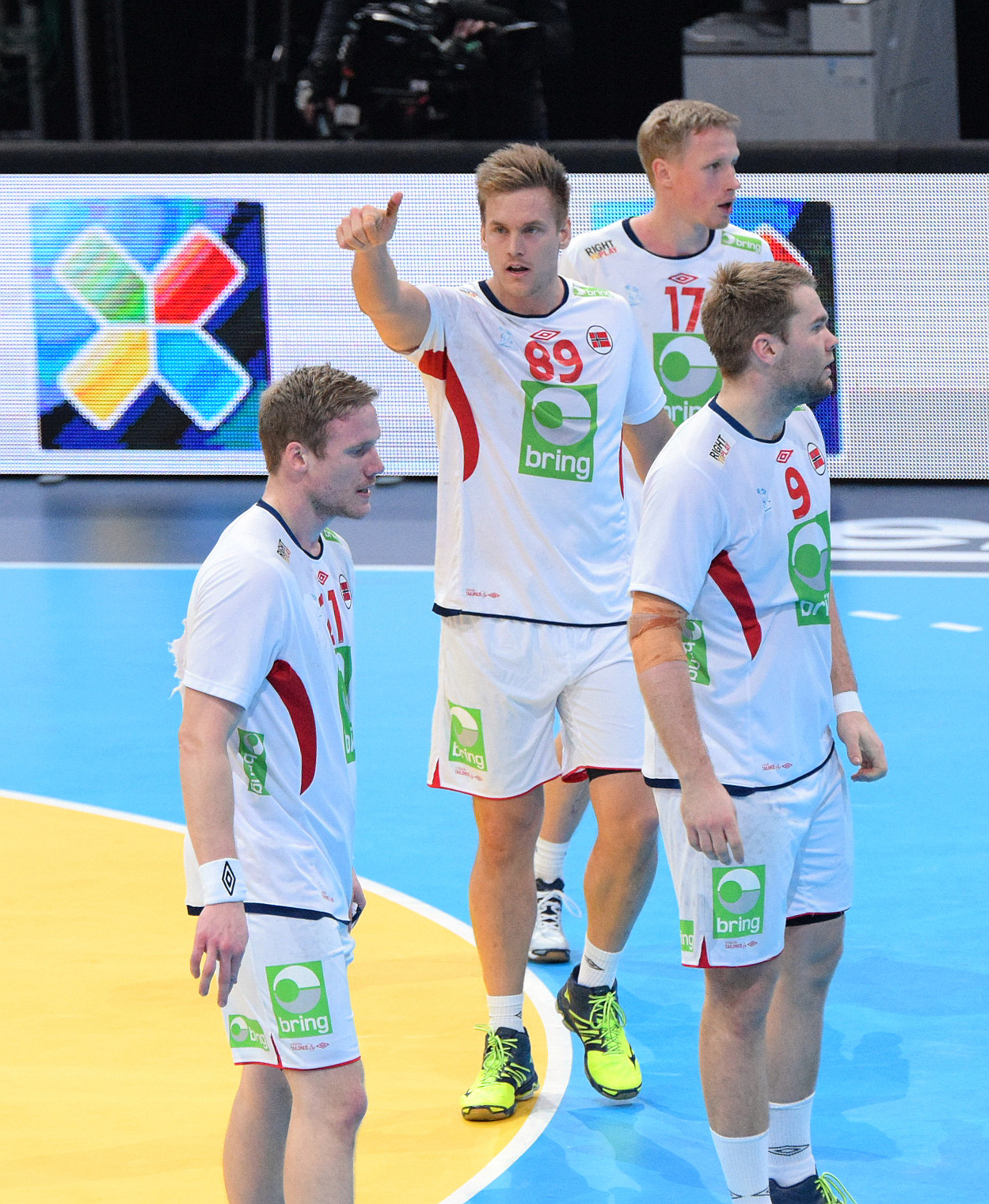
