= Kristian Kjelling =

Norwegian handball player and coach (born 1980)

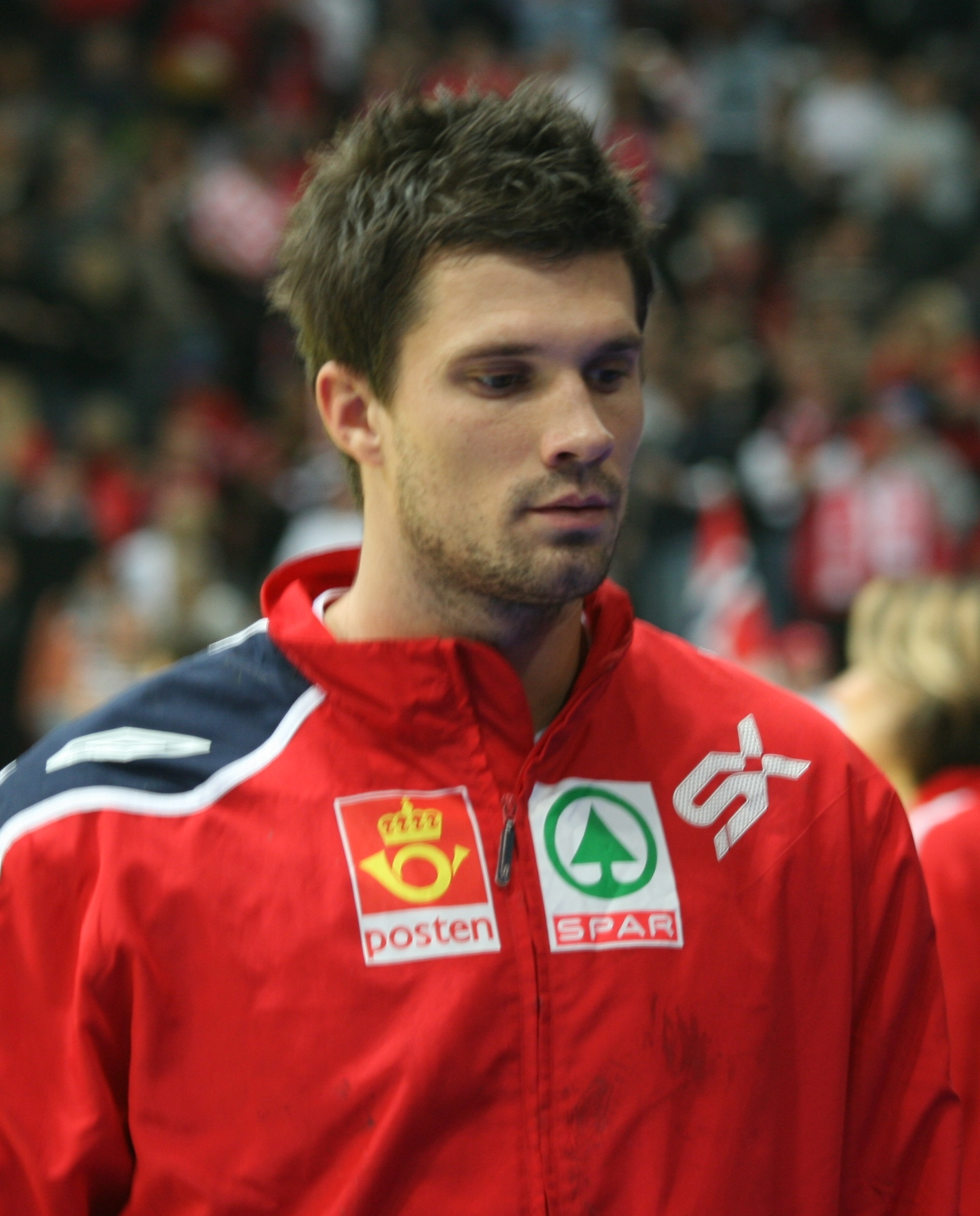
- Kristian Kjelling with Team Norway during the EHF European Handball Championship in Norway January 2008

Personal information
- Full name: Kristian Cato Walby Kjelling
- Born: 8 September 1980 (age 46) Oslo, Norway
- Height: 1.97 m (6 ft 6 in)

Sport
- Sport: Handball
- Position: Left back

Youth career
- Years: Team
- –1998: Kjelsås

Senior clubs
- Years: Team
- 1998–1999: Vestli IL
- 1999–2002: Drammen HK
- 2002–2006: CB Ademar León
- 2006–2009: Portland San Antonio
- 2009–2013: Aalborg Håndbold
- 2013–2015: Bjerringbro-Silkeborg
- 2015–2016: Drammen HK
National team
Years	Team	Apps	(Gls)
2001–2014	Norway	159	(615)

Kristian Cato Walby Kjelling (Norwegian pronunciation: [ˈkrɪ̀stɪjɑn ˈçɛ̀lːɪŋ]; born 8 September 1980) is a retired Norwegian handball player, who was part of the national team from 2001 to 2014. He last played for the Norwegian club Drammen HK. He is now their coach.

== Career ==
Before re-joining Drammen HK he played for the Spanish clubs Portland San Antonio and Ademar León and the Danish clubs AaB Håndbold and Bjerringbro-Silkeborg and the Norwegian clubs Kjelsås, Vestli, and Drammen.

Kjelling won King's cup in 2002 and the EHF Cup-Winners Cup in 2004/2005 with Ademar Leon.
