= Stavanger IF =

Norwegian handball club

- Full name: Stavanger Idrettsforening Håndball
- Short name: SIF
- Founded: May 17, 1905; 121 years ago
- Arena: Stavanger Idrettshall, Stavanger
- Capacity: 4,100
- League: 4. Divisjon (men), 2. Divisjon (women)
- Club colours

Stavanger IF is a Norwegian sports club, best known for their handball team, based in Stavanger. The club also has a football team.

In the 1980s and 1990s, they played in the top Norwegian division and have won two Norwegian championships and silver medals 4 times.

From 2000 to 2009 the senior men's team was in a union with Viking HK. When the team was relegated in 2009 from the top division, Stavanger IF decided to withdraw from the cooperation.

== See also ==
- Viking HK
