= Norwegian Handball Federation =

National sporting association

Norwegian Handball Federation Norges Håndballforbund NHF
- IOC nation: Kingdom of Norway (NOR)
- Sport: Handball
- Other sports: Beach handball; Wheelchair handball
- Official website: www.handball.no

HISTORY
- Year of formation: 2 May 1937; 89 years ago

DEMOGRAPHICS
- Membership size: 138 997 (as of 2019)

AFFILIATIONS
- International federation: International Handball Federation (IHF)
- IHF member since: 1946; 80 years ago
- Continental association: European Handball Federation
- National Olympic Committee: Norwegian Olympic and Paralympic Committee and Confederation of Sports

GOVERNING BODY
- President: Randi Gustad (Norway)

HEADQUARTERS
- Address: Sognsveien 75 A Ullevaal Stadion, Oslo
- Country: Norway
- Secretary General: Mr. Erik Langerud (Norway)

FINANCE
- Sponsors: Hummel International; Norsk Tipping; Gjensidige; Scandic Hotels; Verdens Gang; REMA 1000; Skarpnes; Ice Norge; Posten Norge; Opel

Previous logo

The Norwegian Handball Federation (Norwegian: Norges Håndballforbund, NHF) is the national handball association in Norway.

The Norwegian Handball Federation was founded in 1937, and is a member of the Norwegian Olympic and Paralympic Committee and Confederation of Sports (NIF), the European Handball Federation (EHF) and the International Handball Federation. Its headquarters are in Oslo.

== National teams ==
=== Women ===
The Norway women's national handball team is one of the most successful in handball history. The team played its first match against Sweden in 1946 and emerged as an international force with a bronze medal at the 1986 World Championship.

The women's team has won five World Championship titles (1999, 2011, 2015, 2021, 2025), ten European Championship titles (a record), and three Olympic gold medals (2008, 2012, 2024). Norway is the only team in handball history, men's or women's, to have won the European Championship four consecutive times (2020, 2022, 2024, and 2026). The team has held all three major titles simultaneously on three occasions (2011–12, 2014–15, 2024–25).

Notable coaches include Marit Breivik (1994–2009), who led the team to six international gold medals, and Thorir Hergeirsson (2009–2024), under whom the team continued its dominance.

=== Men ===
The Norway men's national handball team has historically been less successful than the women's team but experienced a breakthrough in the late 2010s. Under coach Christian Berge (2014–2022), the team won silver medals at the 2017 and 2019 World Championships and a bronze medal at the 2020 European Championship. Star player Sander Sagosen was named MVP at both World Championship finals.

The men's team qualified for only one Olympic Games (1972) prior to 2020 but have since become regular contenders at major championships.

== Domestic competitions ==
The NHF organises the top-level handball leagues in Norway, known as REMA 1000-ligaen for both men and women.

The men's league was established in 1966 and is contested by fourteen teams. Sandefjord TIF holds the record for most league titles, while Elverum has won the most playoff championships.

The women's league was established in 1968. Larvik HK dominated the competition for two decades, winning nineteen league titles including thirteen consecutive championships from 2004–05 to 2016–17. Vipers Kristiansand ended Larvik's dominance in 2018 and has since emerged as the leading club.

Norwegian clubs have achieved success in European competition. Larvik HK won the EHF Champions League in 2011, and Vipers Kristiansand won the title three times consecutively (2021, 2022, 2023).

== Events hosted ==
Norway has hosted or co-hosted several major international handball tournaments:

- 1993 World Women's Handball Championship (sole host)
- 1999 World Women's Handball Championship (co-hosted with Denmark) – Final held at Håkons Hall, Lillehammer, where Norway won their first world title before 11,200 spectators
- 2025 World Men's Handball Championship (co-hosted with Denmark and Croatia) – This marked the first time Norway hosted the men's World Championship, with matches held at Unity Arena (formerly Telenor Arena) in Bærum

Norway is scheduled to co-host the 2031 World Men's Handball Championship with Denmark and Iceland.

== History ==
Former presidents of the federation include Carl E. Wang (president 1972–1977), Tor Lian (president 1985–1999), and Karl-Arne Johannessen (president 1999–2004 and 2009–2015). Kåre Geir Lio was president from 2015. In May 2025 Randi Gustad was elected new president of the Norwegian Handball Federation, succeeding Lio.
