= Vestfyns Kunstmuseum =

- Location: Assens, Denmark
- Coordinates: 55.2698°N 9.8967°E
- Type: Art museum
- Website: www.museumvestfyn.dk

The Vestfyns Kunstmuseum is an art museum located in Assens, Denmark. The works are exhibited in a house next to Willemoesgården, the home of Danish naval hero, Peter Willemoes.

The museum's collection includes works by Christian Berthelsen, Dankvart Dreyer, Georg Ernst, Syrak Hansen, Niels Hyhn, Elisabeth Jerichau Baumann, Harald Jerichau, Jens Adolf Jerichau, and Thorvald Læssøe.
