= Church of Our Lady, Assens =

Coordinates: 55.2693°N 9.8940°E

Church of Our Lady
- Vor Frue Kirke
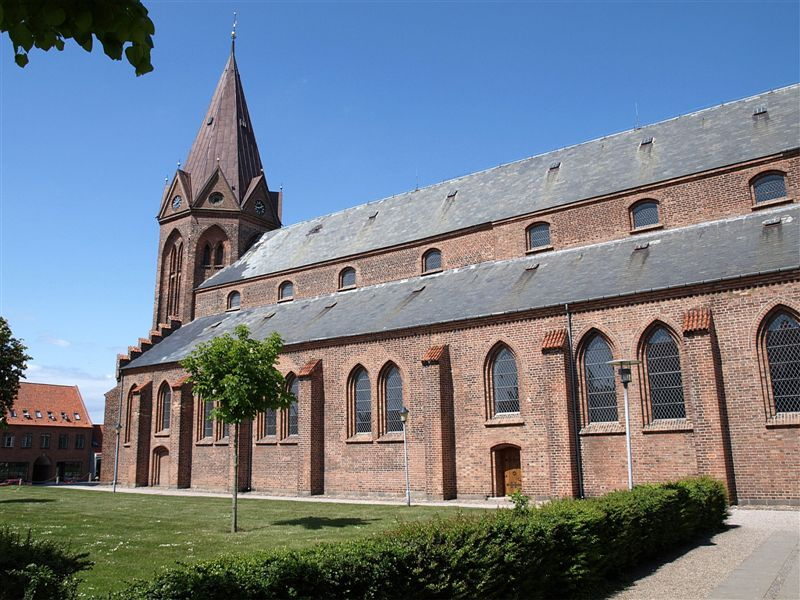
- Church of Our Lady
- Location: Damgade 17, 5610 Assens
- Country: Denmark
- Denomination: Church of Denmark
- Previous denomination: Roman Catholic Church

History
- Founded: 1488

Administration
- Diocese: Diocese of Funen
- Deanery: Assens Provsti
- Parish: Assens Sogn

The Church of Our Lady in Assens is located on (Fyn). It is a Church of Denmark parish church.

== History ==
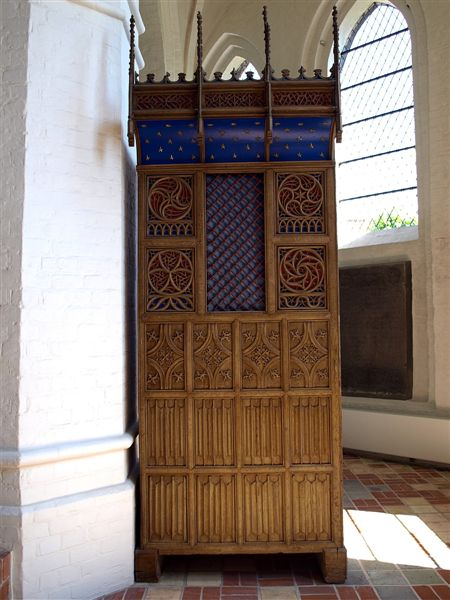
monstrance

The main chapel on the north side of the church and the lower, square part of the tower are remains of a Romanesque church. In 1488 the church stood in its present form. The Catholic past of the building is heralded in a monstrance, now located to the right of the altar, and a stoup in what was then the porch.

After the Reformation, it came into use as a protestant church. It underwent rough-handed restoration work in 1842-56 and 1881-84.

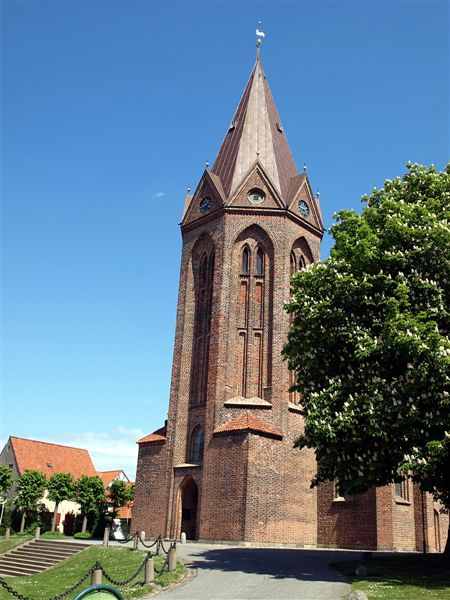
The tower

== Architecture ==
The church is a three-nave church built in large, red brick of the type in Denmark known as monk stone (munkesten). Typically of Gothic churches, the roofs of the aisles are lower than that of the central nave, allowing light to enter through clerestory windows.

The tower stands at 48 metres. Its octagonal upper part is unusual in Danish church architecture, the only similar design is that of the five towers of Church of Our Lady in Kalundborg.

== Furnishings ==
The altarpiece dates from about 1620. The painting is from 1826 and by Dankvart Dreyer. It was a gift from the painter who was born in Assens and settled there again later in life. Another work by a local artist found in the church is a marble angel created by the sculptor Jens Adolf Jerichau who was born in Assens in 1816, incidentally the same year as Dreyer.

The pulpit, from the second half of the 17th century, was made in Hans Nielsen Bangs's workshop and is decorated with woodcarvings depicting scenes from the Passion on the sides, and nine wooden figures on the edges, probably representing nine of the disciples. Figures of the last three disciples may have decorated the stairs leading up to the pulpit. It also has an hour glass from the 18th century, probably to ensure that the priest's services did not last more than one hour.

The wrought iron balustrade of the altar rails feature a crossed hammer and key, the trademark of King Christian IV's court smith, Casper Finck.

The pews are from 2007. Individual chairs were introduced as seating in the early 1940s. They have an integrated sound system in the backrests and heated seats.

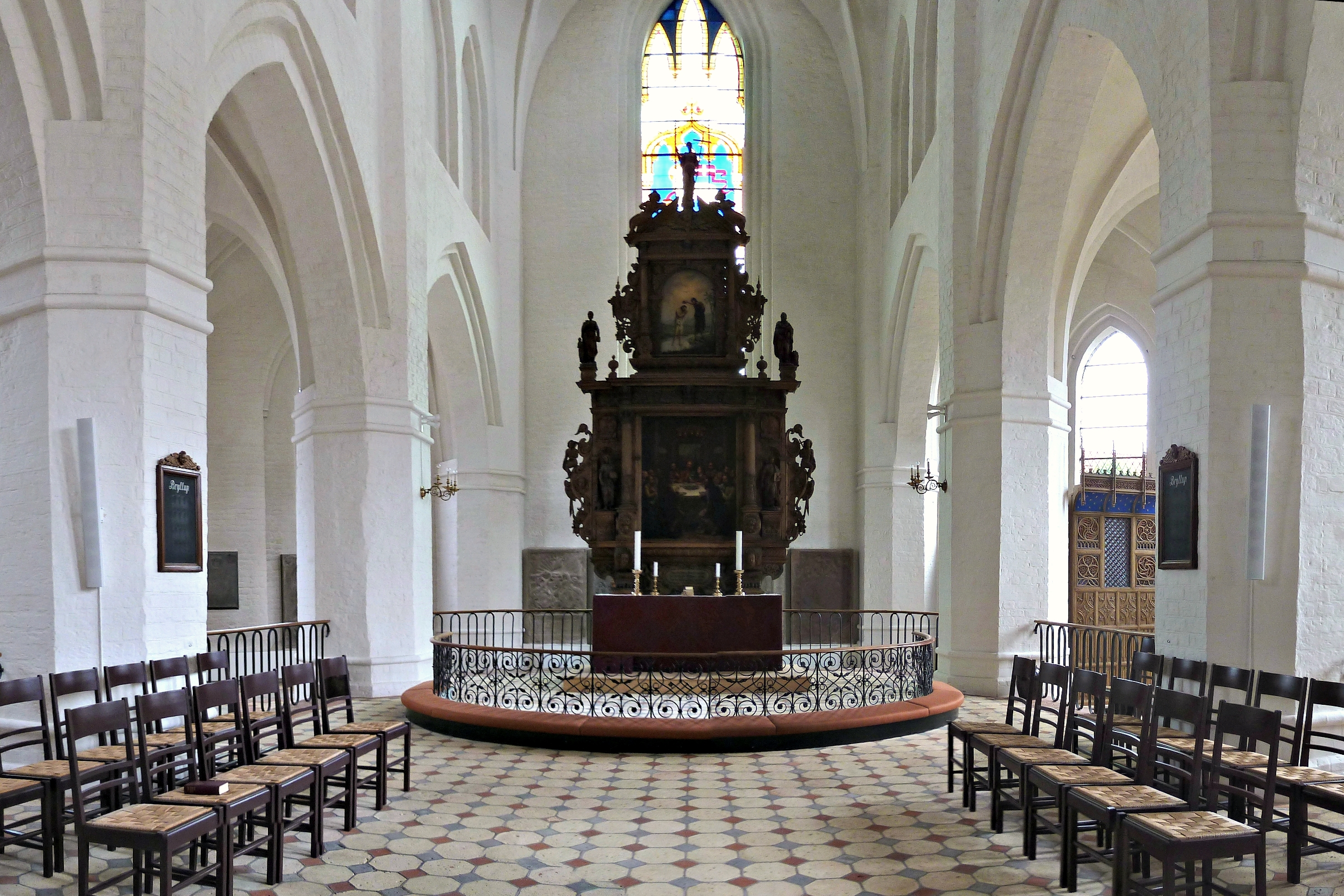
The altar

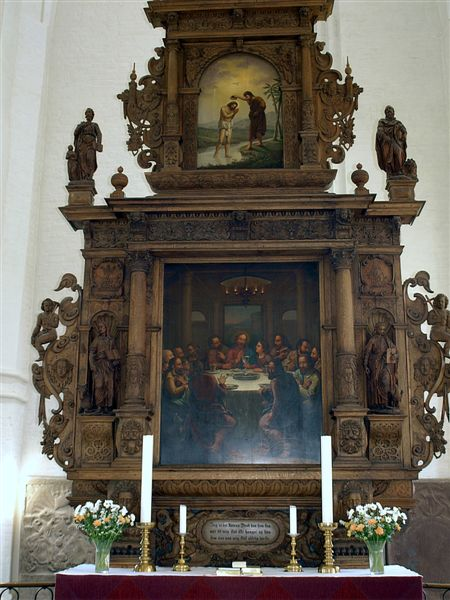
Altar piece

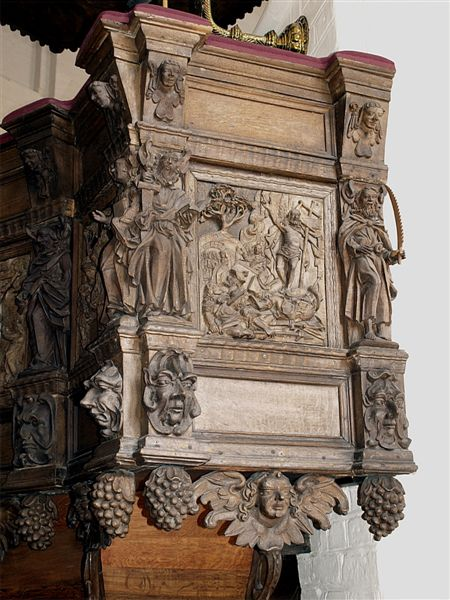
Pulpit

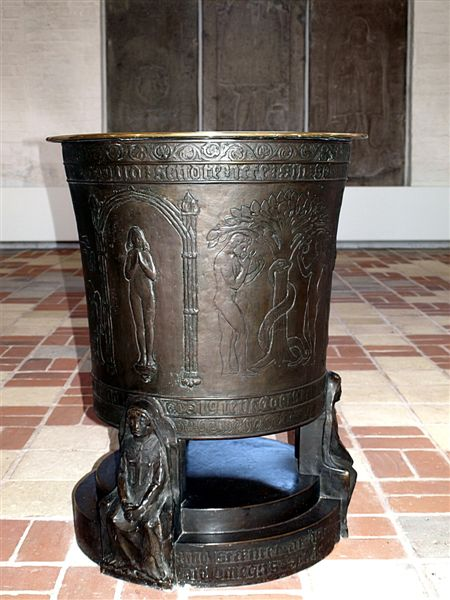
Bronze font, 1910

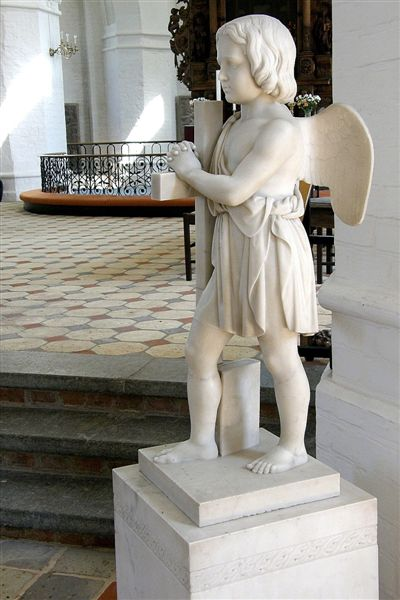
Jerichau's marble angel

== Burials ==
More than 450 people were buried inside the church in the 18th century. Some were covered with richly decorated tomb stones while others were covered with brick or simple wooden planks. All the burials were removed from the church in the beginning of the 19th century when burials inside churches were abolished due to health risk. The tomb stones were then placed along the external walls of the church.

== Panoramas ==
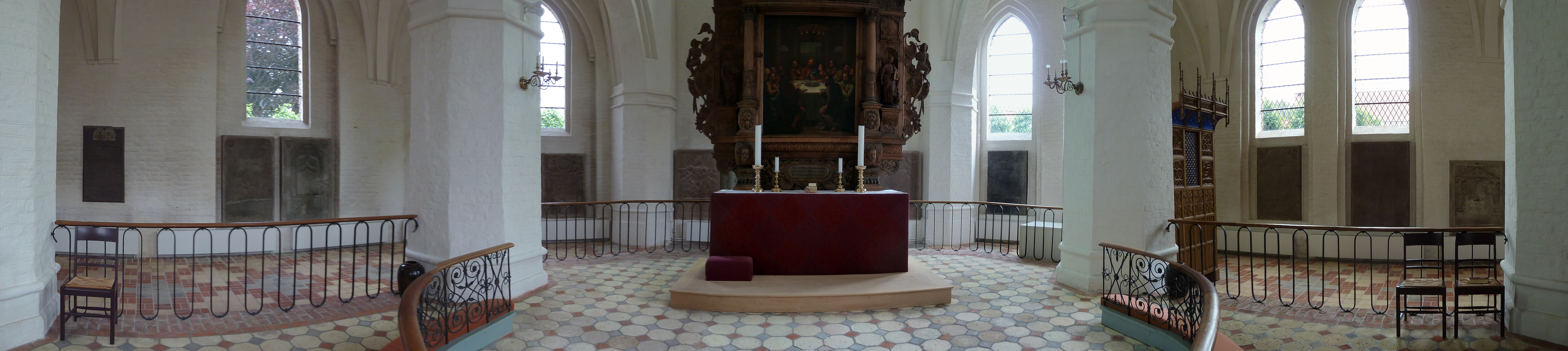
Interior panorama showing the chancel, altar and altar piece

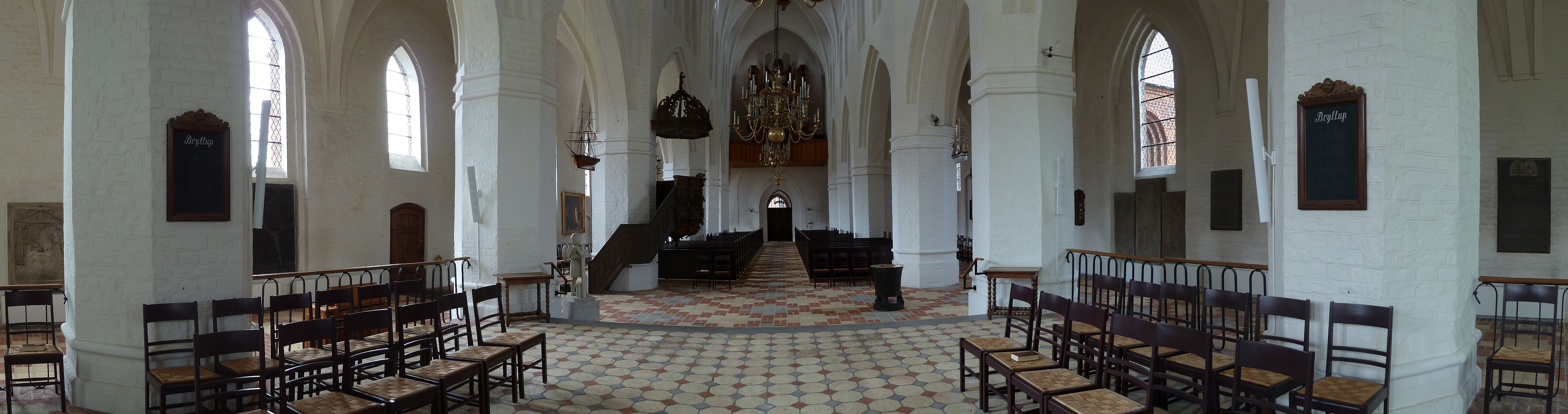
Interior panorama showing the pulpit
