= Tølløsegård =

Manor house in Tølløse, Denmark

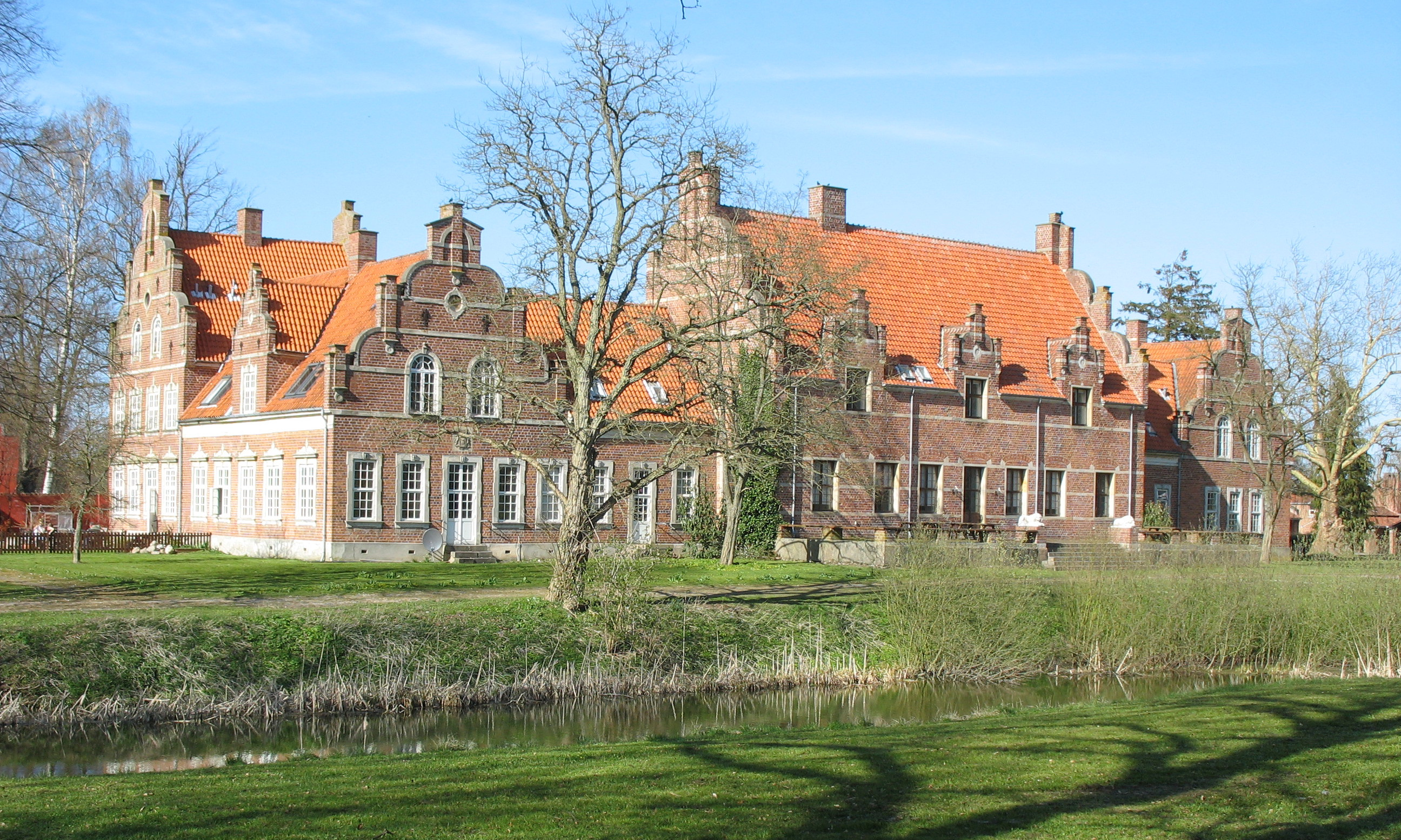

General information
- Location: Tølløsevej 97; 4340 Tølløse, Denmark
- Coordinates: 55°36′43″N 11°44′42″E
- Completed: 1944

Design and construction
- Architect: Ernst Kühn

Tølløsegård, also known as Tølløse Castle (Danish: Tølløse Slot), is a former manor house and estate located at Tølløse, Denmark. It has since 1997 been operated as a school under the name Tølløse Slots Efterskole. The current main building was built after a fire in 1944.

== History ==
=== Early history ===
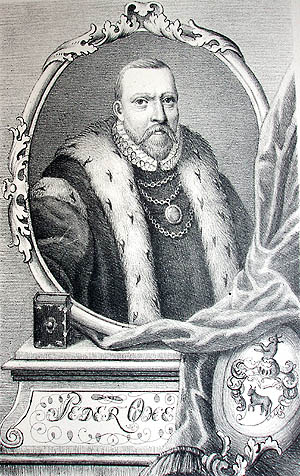
Peder Oxe

Tølløsegaard is first mentioned in 1370 when it was owned by the Diocese of Roskilde and managed as a fief. After the Reformation in 1536, the estate was confiscated by the Crown but the fief was as a sort of pension granted to the last Catholic bishop, Ove Bille.

Ove Billes was succeeded by Peder Christensen Dyre but lost his fief when he was found guilty of perjury in connection with a legal dispute in 1558.

The crown then ceded the ownership of Yølløsegaard to Peder Oxe in exchange for other property. He constructed a new main building. Peder Oxe was in 1552 made a pricy counsellor but had to resign from all his public offices after a controversy with Christian II in 1558. He was later that same year subpoenaed for embezzlement but fled to Lothringen. His estates in Denmark was then ceded to his sworn enemy, Herluf Trolle, the founder of Herlufsholm Abbey School.

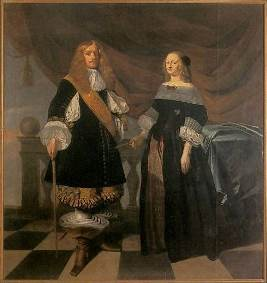
Christen Skeel and Birgitte Rosenkrantz

Peder Oxe returned to Denmark during the Northern Seven Years' War and got his estates Tølløse, Gisselfeld and Løgismose back. In 1567, he was appointed rigshofmester. His widow, Mette Rosenkrantz, inherited the estates after her husband's death. On her death in 1477, Yølløsegaard passed to Oxe's sister, Sidsel Oxe, who died without children four years later. She endowed Tølløsegaard to her two nephews, Jens and Christian Barnekow. Christian Barnekow, who bought his brother out, was one of the leading nobles of his time. On his death, in 1612, Tølløsegaard passed to his son-in-law, Tønne Friis. His widow, Lene Barnekow, stayed on the estate after her husband's death. Their daughter, Margrethe Friis, in 1665 ceded the estate to Christian Skeel in exchange for other property. His son-in-law by marriage, Frederik Gersdorff, inherited Tølløsegaard in 1687 but died just five years later. His widow, Elisabeth Skeel, sold the estate to Otto Krabbe. In 1709, he sold Tølløsegaard to Brostrup Albertin. His widow sold it to Christian Ditlev Reventlow, who nine years later ceded it to his son, Conrad Ditlev Reventlow. On his death, Tølløsegaard passed to his son-in-law, Gustav Frederik Ysenburg-Büdingen, who supposedly came to detest the premises after his young daughter died in an accident on the estate. In 1763, he sold Tølløsegaard to Claus de Caspergaard. Caspergaard's widow sold the estate to Johan Thomas Neergaard in 1768.

=== Zeuthen family ===
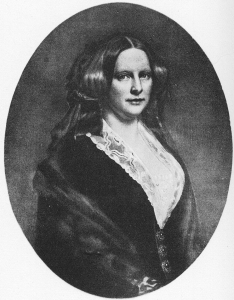
Comtesse, Sophie Hedevig Zeuten, néeSchulin

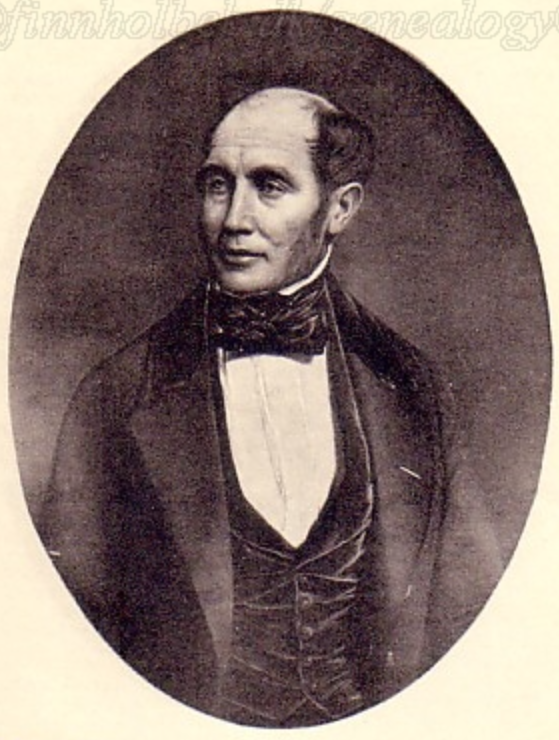
Christian Frederik Zeuthen.

In 1793, Neergaard sold it to Peter Christian Zeuthen. Zeuthen was president of Landhusholdningsselskabet. His son, Christian Frederik Zeuthen, established the Barony of Zeuthen in 1843. He was one of the members of the Danish Constituent Assembly who was appointed by the king and voted against the constitution in 1849. His widow, Sophie Hedevig, née Schulin, kept the estate after her husband's death in 1850. She endowed the barony to her youngest brother, Christian Frederik, who assumed the name Schulin-Zeuthen. On his death in 1873, it passed to his nephew Christian Julius William Schulin-Zeuthen. He was in turn succeeded by his own nephew, William C. S. Schulin-Zeuthen.

=== Later history ===
The Barony of Zeuthen was as a consequence of the Lensafløsningslov of 1919 dissolved in 1923. Tølløsegaard was that same year sold to H. O. Larsen. It then changed hands several times over the next few years. In 1927, it was acquired by A. Larsen. In 1941, it was acquired by H. Hollesen.

== Architecture ==
The current main building was constructed after a fire in 1944 from a design by Ernst Kühn.

== Today ==
Tølløsegaard has since 1997 been operated as a school under the name Tølløse Slots Efterskole.

== List of owners ==
- ( –1536) Bishopric of Roskilde
- (1536–1558) The Crown
- (1558–1575) Peder Oxe
- (1575–1588) Mette Rosenkrantz, gift Oxe
- (1588–1592) Sidsel Oxe gift Podebusk
- (1592– ) Jens Barnekow
- (1592–1612) Christian Barnekow
- (1612–1642) Tønne Friis
- (1642–1660) Lene Barnekow, gift Friis
- (1660–1665) Margrethe Friis
- (1665–1687) Christen Skeel
- (1687–1691) Frederik Gersdorff
- (1691–1706) Øllegaard Gersdorff
- (1706–1709) Otto Krabbe
- (1709– ) Brostrup Albertin
- ( –1728) Enke efter Brostrup Albertin
- (1728–1737) Christian Ditlev Reventlow
- (1737–1750) Conrad Ditlev Reventlow
- (1750–1761) Gustav Frederik Ysenburg-Büdingen
- (1763– ) Claus de Caspergaard
- ( –1768) Enke efter de Caspergaard
- (1768–1793) Johan Thomas de Neegaard
- (1793–1823) Peter Christian Zeuthen
- (1823–1826) Boet efter Peter Christian Zeuthen
- (1826–1850) Christian Frederik Zeuthen
- (1850–1866) Sophie Hedevig Zeuthen, néeSchulin
- (1866–1873) Christian Frederik Schulin-Zeuthen
- (1873–1919) Christian Julius William Schulin-Zeuthen
- (1919–1923) William C. S. Schulin-Zeuthen
- (1923–1924) H. O. Larsen
- (1924–1926) J. de Neergaard
- (1926–1941) A. Larsen
- (1941–1949) H. Hollesen
- (1949– ) Arly Henckel
- (1975–2006) Tølløse Kommune
- (2006–2010) Holbæk Kommune
- (2010– ) Tølløse Slots Efterskole
