= Christian Pløyen =

Danish jurist and government official

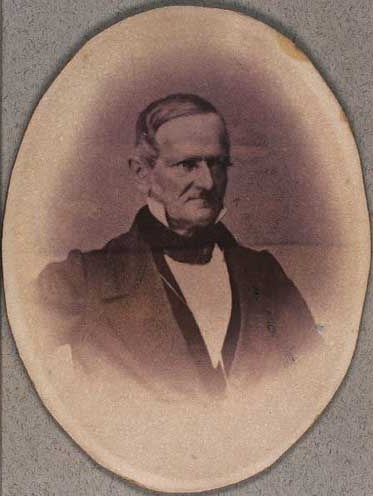
- Born: 12 January 1803; Copenhagen, Denmark
- Died: 9 June 1867 (aged 64); Holbæk, Denmark
- Spouse: Emma Theodora Manthey (m. 1830)
- Father: Frederik Adeler Pløyen

Christian Pløyen (12 January 1803 – 9 June 1867) was a Danish jurist and government official.

He was a landfoged (sheriff) from 1830, and from 1837 to 1847 he was amtmand (bailiff) in the Faroe Islands; Pløyen was very well liked in the Faroe Islands. He is known for writing the famous "Grindavísan" (Faroese for 'the pilot whale ballad').

== Biography ==
Christian Pløyen was the son of diplomat Frederik Adler Pløyen. After completing his examen artium at Metropolitanskolen in 1821, he studied law and in 1826 became a jurist. He then became a lawyer in the Chamber of Deputies (Rentekammeret) until 1830, when he was appointed bailiff of the Faroe Islands. The same year, he married Emma Theodora Manthey.

In 1837 he replaced Frederik Ferdinand Tillisch as bailiff of the Faroe Islands. He is known for his journey to the Shetland Islands in 1839 with three Faroese. The trip was a deliberate initiative to develop cooperation between the two island groups. One of the results of the trip was that the Faroese were able to benefit from the more modern fishing methods of the Shetlanders. In 1840, Pløyen was a member of the Danish government commission that dealt with the abolition of the Danish trade monopoly over the Faroe Islands. Even today, he is revered in the Faroe Islands as a person who did more for the Faroe Islands than he had to as bailiff.

In 1848 he was appointed by Frederik VII to represent the Faroe Islands in the Danish Constituent Assembly, which was to formulate the Constitution of Denmark. On 1 January 1849 he became bailiff for Holbæk Amt, until his death in 1867. In 1850 he was appointed Chamberlain and in 1867 Commander of the Order of the Dannebrog.

A contemporary Danish biographer described him as an exceptionally skilled official who was popular both in the Faroe Islands and in Holbaek Amt.

== Works ==
- Erindringer fra en Rejse til Shetlandsøerne, Orkneyøerne og Skotland i Sommeren 1839, Copenhagen 1840, Tórshavn 1966, Vedbæk 1999 OCLC 771319278
- Reminiscences of a voyage to Shetland, Orkney & Scotland in the summer of 1839; translated from Danish by Catherine Spence. Lerwick: T. & J. Manson, 1896. OCLC 606209105
- Grindavísan; drawings by Óli Petersen; Ed. Jústines Olsen et al. – 2nd revised edition – Tórshavn: Føroya skúlabókagrunnur, 2004. (48 p., in Danish and Faroese.) ISBN 9789991803876
