= Mathias Lüttichau =

Danish nobleman (1795–1870)

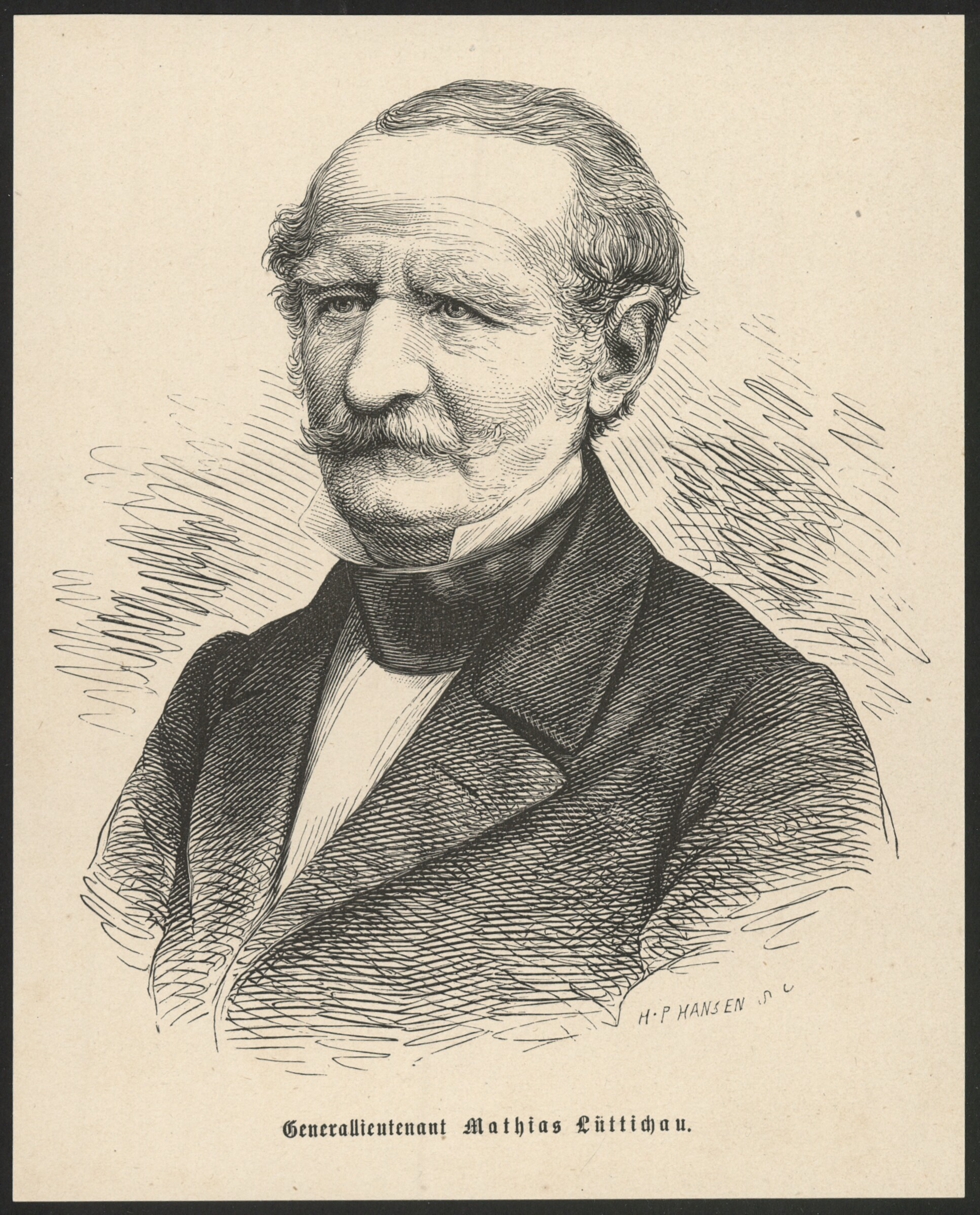
Portrait by Hans Peter Hansen

Mathias von Lüttichau (9 December 1795, Egebjerggård – 13 April 1870, Store Grundet) was a Danish nobleman who served as a royal chamberlain and as Denmark's Minister of War. He was a member of the 1848 Danish Constituent Assembly by royal appointment. Lüttichau was one of the 10 members of the assembly who protested against the creation of the constitution in favour of an absolute monarchy.

Lüttichau was a member of the House of Lüttichau, a German and Danish noble family.
