= Christian Frederik Zeuthen =

Danish landowner

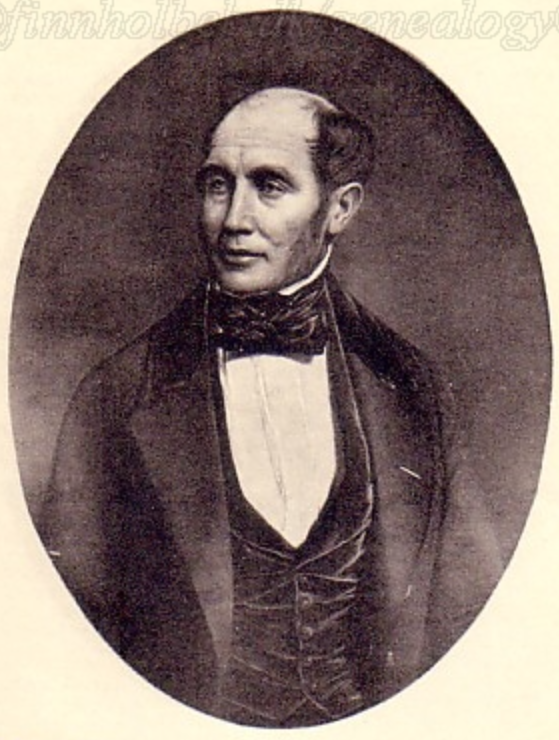
Christian Frederik Zeuthen

Christian Frederik Zeuthen (14 December 1794 - 12 November 1850) was a Danish landowner and diplomat. In 1843, he was created a baron and his estates Tølløsegård and Sonnerupgaard were at the same time converted into a barony. He was a member of the Danish Constituent Assembly by royal appointment.

== Early life and education ==
Zeuthen was born on 14 December 1794 in Copenhagen, the son of judge and landowner Peter Christian Zeuthen (1755–1823) and Christine V. M. Bornemann (1764–1802).He earned a law degree from the University of Copenhagen in 1815 and then entered diplomatic service. He was first attaché in Vienna, from 1823 legation secretary in Stockholm, where he served as chargé d'affaires in 1827–28.

== Landowner ==
When in 1828 he took over his father's estates, Tølløsegård with Søgård and Sonnerupgaard, he resigned from the foreign service and devoted himself to the management of the extensive estates. In 1843, he was created a baron and his estates were at the same time converted into a barony.

== Politics ==
In 1841 Zeuthen was selected as one of the representatives of the estate owners in the negotiations that led up to the adoption of the Constitution of Denmark. He participated in the Østifterne meetings in 1842, 1844 and 1846 but did not take much part in the negotiations. He was a member of Roskilde Assembly of Estates (Roskilde Stænderforsamling) in 1848 and was a member of the Danish Constituent Assembly by royal appointment. Zeuthen continued to represent the conservative wing. He strove to build as many conservative guarantees as possible into the constitution, but saw his arguments rejected by the majority of the assembly, and he voted in the final vote against the adoption of the constitution.

Zeuthen was a co-founder of the Godsejerforeningen in 1843. He was active in coordinating the anti-peasant-Bondevennerne forces in the elections to the Constituent Assembly in 1848, and was also involved in the patriotic association (1849), whose purpose was again to oppose the Bondevennerne society at the elections. He was a member of Holbæk county council in 1845–48, was for two terms a member of the National Bank's board of representatives. In 1850m he co-founded the Kreditkassen til selvejendoms promotion. In 1830, he was appointed Hofjægermester.

== Personal life ==
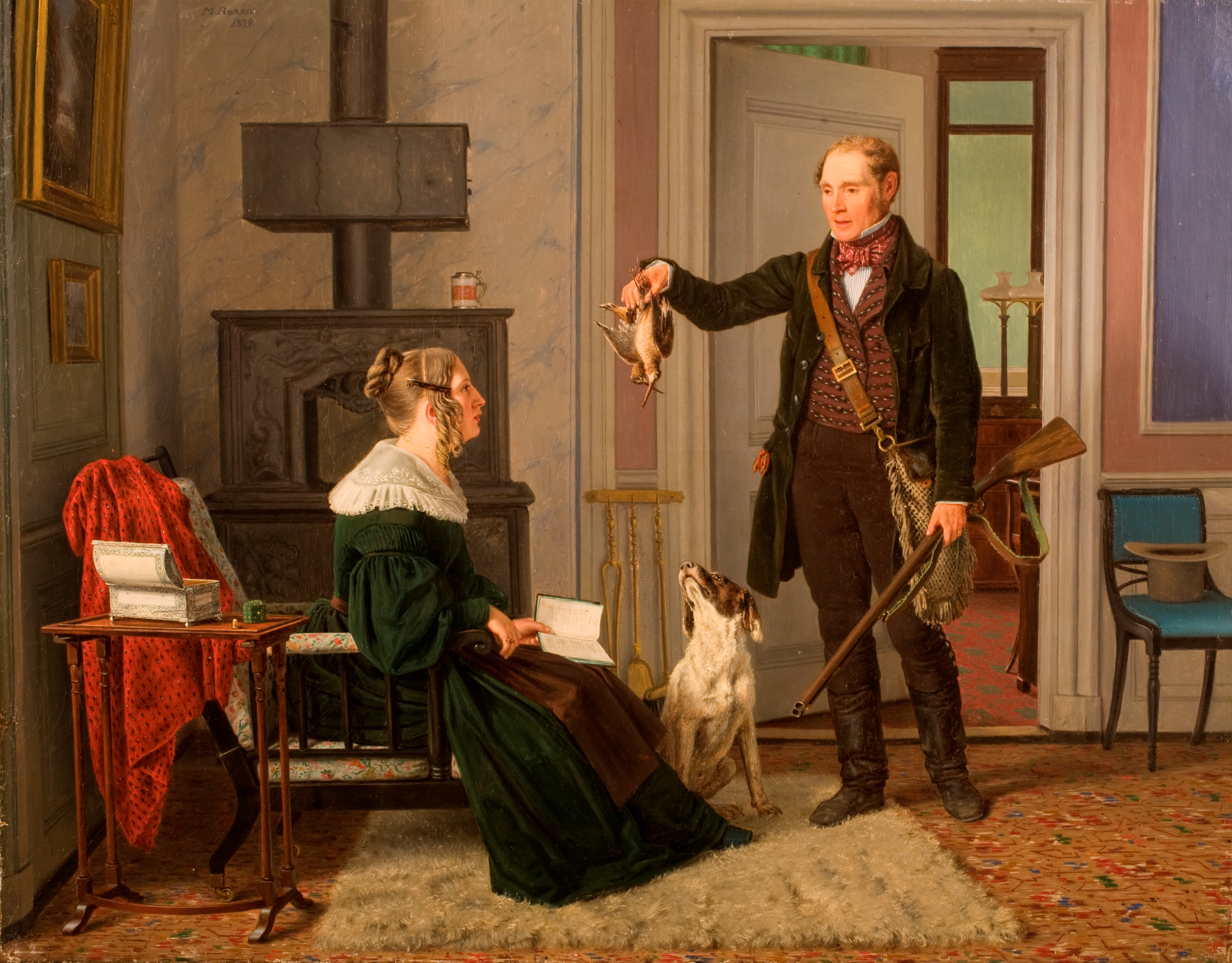
Martinus Rørbye: A Hunter Shows His Wife the Result of the First Snipe Gunt. Portrait of Christian Fr. Zeuthen and his wife Sophie Hedevig, 1839, The Hirschsprung Collection.

On 28 October 1829, Zeuthen was married to Sophie Hedevig Schulin (1810–1866). She was a daughter of count Sigismund Ludvig Schulin (1777– 1836) and Louise Elisabeth Brown (1785–1851). The couple had no children

Zeuthen was created a Knight of the Order of the Dannebrog in 1826. 1830 saw him appointed as Hofjægermester (Member of the Royal Hunt). He commissioned a double portrait of himself and his wife from Martinus Rørbye.

Zeuthen died on 12 November 1850. He is buried at Tølløse cemetery. Sophie Hedvig Schulin kept the estates after his death. Sophienholm was constructed for her as a dower house in 1864.. However, she did not manage to live there very long, as she died already in 1866. In the following years, Sophienholm was the residence of Baroniet Zeuthen's forester, i.a. Oluf Sparre-Ulrich, seen in the next picture with his wife Julie. After them, forest knight Carl Bistrup lived in the main building for a number of years - in the 3rd photo we look into his living room.

After Sophie Hedvig Zeuthen's death in 1636, Sonnerupgaard was endowed to her brother Otte Brahe who sold it to Jørgen Urne later that same year. Irne and his wife were also the owners of Alslev, Nær and Knudseje.
