= Johan Ludwig Lund =

Danish painter (1777–1867)

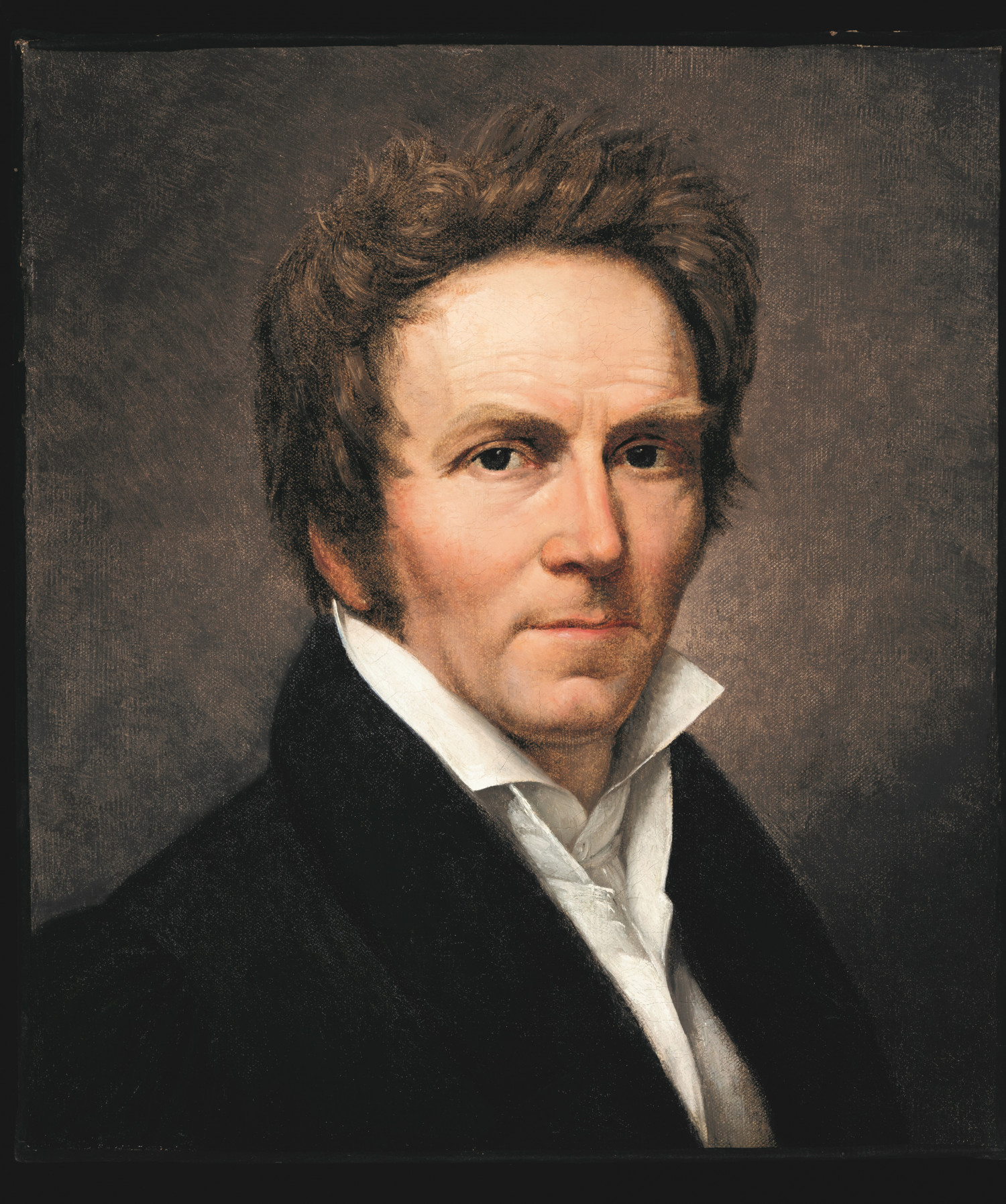
Self-portrait, 1827

Johan Ludwig Gebhard Lund (primarily known as J. L. Lund) (16 October 1777 – 3 March 1867) was a Danish painter, born in Kiel, Duchy of Holstein, to master painter Hans Giewert Lund and his wife Maria Magdalena Christina Bremer. An adherent of romanticism, he is known for his history paintings.

== Training as an artist ==
Lund came to Copenhagen to train as an artist, and in 1797, at the age of 22, he started his studies at the Royal Danish Academy of Art (Det Kongelige Danske Kunstakademi) with the support of Johan Frederik Clemens, acclaimed royal engraver and influential member of the Academy. He came quickly into contact with the rich and powerful of that time, which had a decided influence on his artistic development. He studied under neoclassicist Nikolaj Abraham Abildgaard at the Academy from 1797 to 1799, and taught drawing privately during his student years. He received the Academy's small silver medallion in 1798 and the large silver medallion in 1799, but never competed for the gold medallion.

== Student travels ==
Lund was friends with Caspar David Friedrich, another student at the Academy and like-minded fellow romanticist, and traveled with him to Dresden, Germany, in 1799 to continue his studies at the Dresden Academy. From there he went on to Paris, where he studied under Jacques-Louis David from 16 September 1800 to April 1802. During this time, he also took excursions to Switzerland and Lake Maggiore (August–October 1801).

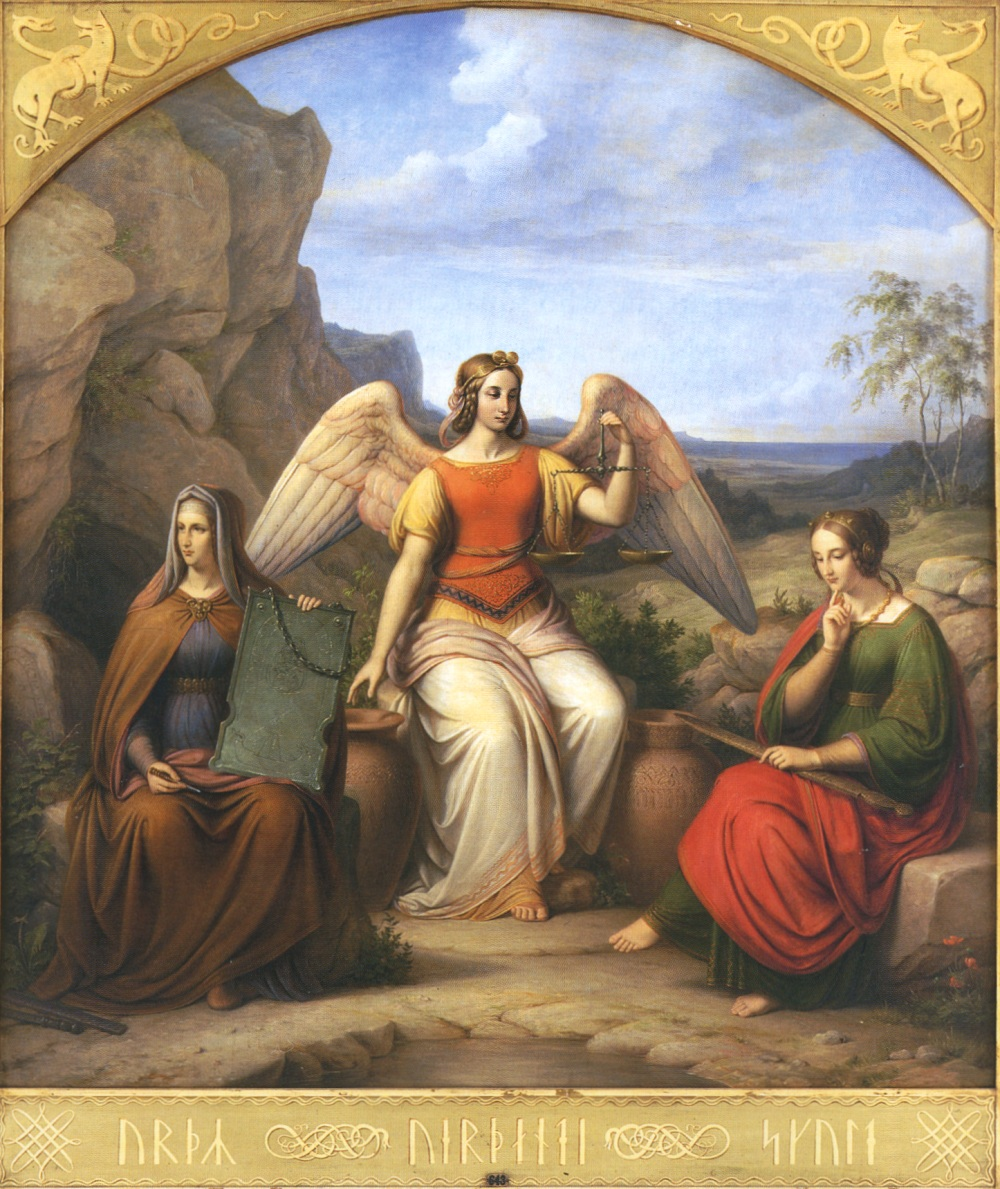
The three Norns of Norse mythology

He went on to Italy in 1802, first to Florence and then to Rome, where he lived from 1802 to 1810. In Florence, he was deeply affected by the religious art prior to Raphael's time. He was part of the expatriate colony of Danish and German artists and scientists in Italy, which included Friederike Brun, Charlotte Humboldt, Georg Zoëga and Bertel Thorvaldsen. Cultured, talented and sociable, he secured himself many important contacts during this time, including those within the Danish royal house.

From 1804 to 1807, he received stipends from the Academy, including a travel allowance to support his stay in Italy, between 1804 and 1806.

During that time and also years later during a subsequent stay in Rome, he associated himself with the German painters known as the Nazarenes, a group of romantic painters headed by Johann Friedrich Overbeck and Peter Cornelius. He studied with them the early Italian style of painting, which was then considered primitive.

In 1803 and 1804 he painted a large picture, "Andromache i Afmagt ved Synet af Hectors mishandlede Lig" ("Andromache, Powerless at the Sight of Hector’s Maligned Corpse") which was seized by English pirates in 1807 on its voyage to Denmark. It was during the Napoleonic Wars when England and Denmark were enemies. This painting is now in the Danish Ambassador's residence in Rome. A companion piece painted between 1807 and 1811, "Pyrrhus og Andromache ved Hectors Grav" ("Pyrrhus and Andromache at Hector's Grave"), was contributed to the Danish Royal Painting Collection, now the Danish National Gallery (Statens Museum for Kunst), by Baron Schubart, General Consul in Livorno.

These paintings helped establish himself as an idealistic and romantic painter, in contrast to rival neoclassicist Christoffer Wilhelm Eckersberg's realistic approach to the visual arts. The two artists represented, for many years, opposing viewpoints and cultural ideals in the Danish art scene.

== Academic career ==
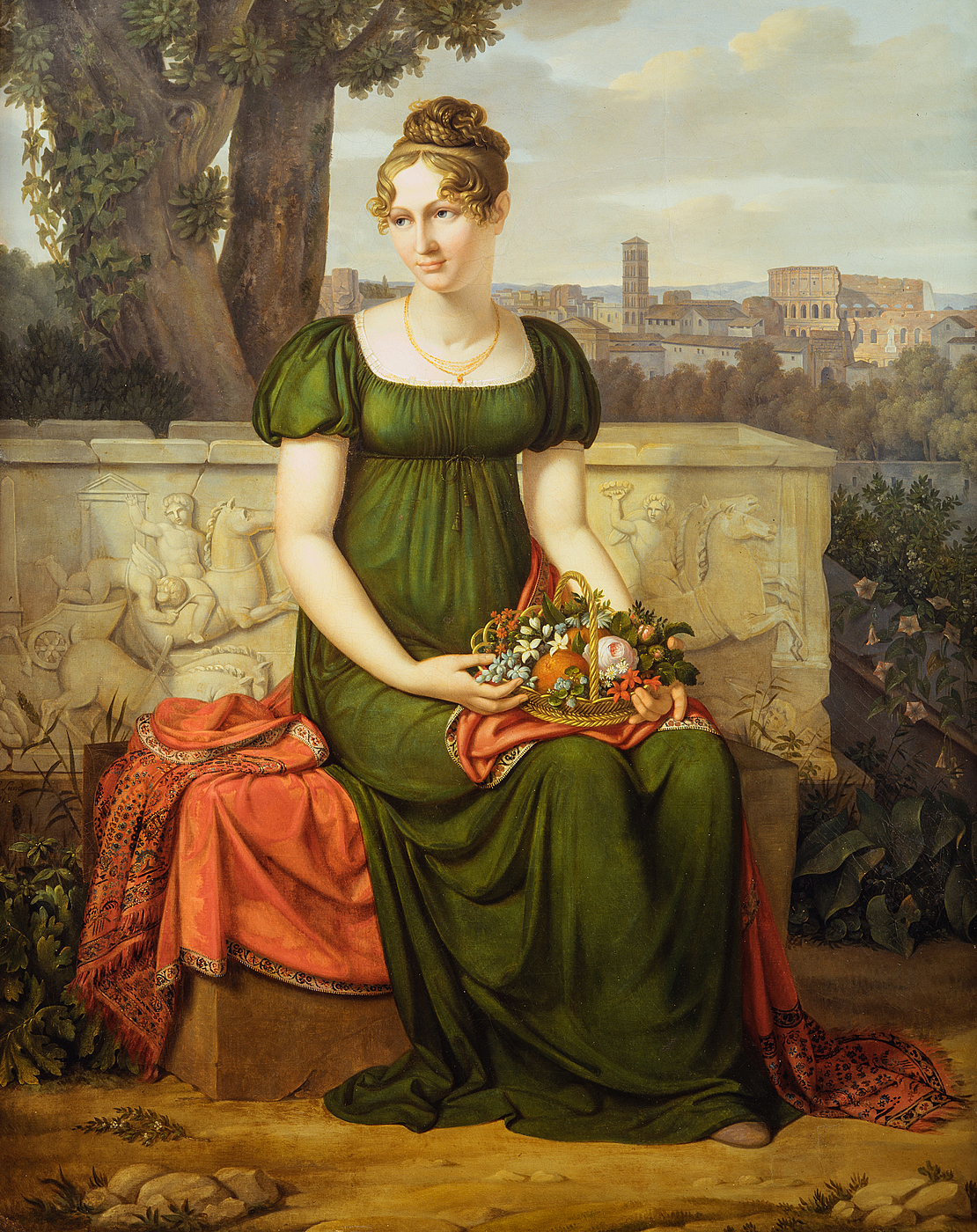
Ida Brun, 1811

In 1809 Lund began attempts to secure the Academy professorship vacated by his former teacher Abildgaard upon his death in 1806. He returned to Denmark in 1810 along with Frederikke Brun in order to more actively pursue the teaching position.

He began exhibiting at Charlottenborg in 1812 and exhibited there routinely until 1861. The Academy also invited him to apply for membership in 1812. He submitted the painting "Habor og Signe" (Hagbard and Signy) for consideration, and he was accepted into the Academy in 1814. While his Nordic-themed painting received praise, it was not displayed in the large painting gallery. While he received the Academy's endorsement to become member, he did not receive their recommendation to become either royal history painter or professor.

The Academy, considering not only Lund's bid for the position, but also that of his rival Eckersberg as well as that of Christian Gotlieb Kratzenstein-Stub, wished to postpone a decision until Eckersberg returned home from his student travels. Lund lost his patience with these delays and traveled back to Rome where he lived from 1816 to 1819. He had now decided to establish himself as an altar painter, and as a member of the Nazarenes.

In 1818 with support from Prince Christian Frederik, he was finally named professor at the Academy along with Christoffer Wilhelm Eckersberg. Kratzenstein-Stub ceased being under consideration upon his death in 1816.

He then returned to Copenhagen accompanied by Bertel Thorvaldsen in 1819, and married Augusta Lorentzen, daughter of the organist, Johan Henrich Lorentzen, and his wife, Frederikke Vilhelmine Lintrup, on 24 December 1820.

The hiring of the two counterparts to the School of Model Painting brought new vitality to the Academy. But while Eckersberg's realism were on the ascent, and he would come to be remembered as a crucial figure of the Golden Age of Danish Painting, Lund's star and romanticism were primarily on the descent.

But during his 42 years at the Academy Lund had a strong influence on his many students. He encouraged them to study 17th century Dutch landscape art, which could be readily seen in Copenhagen. His Romantic approach to art was greatly appreciated by a group of young landscape painters who were younger than Eckersberg's pupils; they aimed to produce evocative landscapes in reaction to Eckersberg's precise depictions of nature. This trend culminated in the large-scale landscapes of the Nationalist Romantic style, His closest students include historical painter Ditlev Blunck, and landscape painters Johan Thomas Lundbye, Dankvart Dreyer, P.C. Skovgaard, and Vilhelm Kyhn.

He served as Treasurer of the Academy 1821–1832 and again 1854–1866. He stopped teaching in 1861, and was eventually titled etatsråd (state advisor or counsellor). He was never named to the highest post at the Academy, Director of the Academy, unlike Eckersberg, his old rival, who served in that capacity from 1827 to 1829.

He had a cheerful and positive personality and was fresh and full of life to the age of 89. He died of natural causes without any sign of sickness during his sleep.

Lund kept his international orientation throughout his life in contrast to the growing nationalism and regionalism in the arts. He kept his contacts in Germany and Italy.

== Works ==
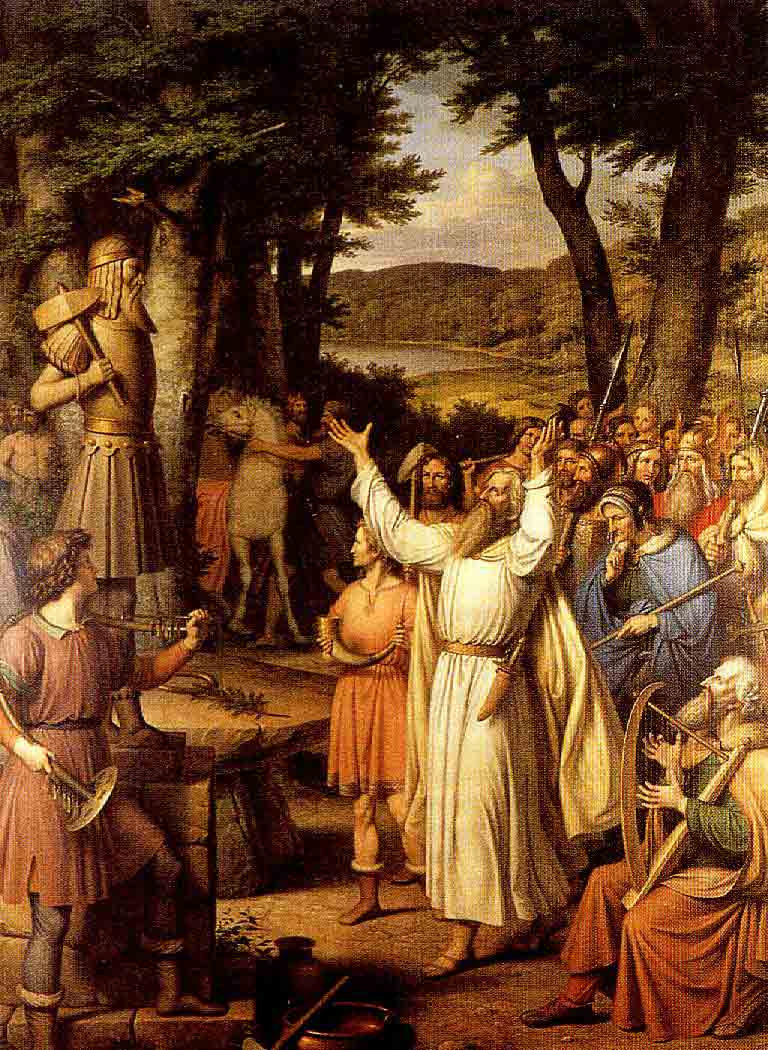
Nordic Sacrificial Scene from the Period of Odin, 1831

His main works were historical paintings with historical, mythological and biblical themes, such as the five large paintings at Christiansborg Palace in Copenhagen, which depicted Denmark's various cultural time periods. These include "Christendommens indførelse i Danmark" ("Christianity's Introduction in Denmark") painted in 1827, until then the largest oil painting to have been painted in Denmark. Again his assignment was matched by a comparable one given to Eckersberg. in which he painted the Oldenborg royal family line in eight large pictures, presumably to replace those painted by Abildgaard and destroyed in the fire of 1794.

The other painting in Lund's series are "Nordisk offerscene fra den Odinske periode" ("Nordic Sacrificial Scene from the Period of Odin") painted in 1831, "Solens tilbedelse" ("Worship of the Sun") painted in 1834, "Procession ved Kristi Legemsfest fra den katolske tid i Danmark" ("Corpus Christi Procession from Denmark's Catholic Period") painted in 1834, and "'Luthersk gudstjeneste" ("Lutheran Church Service") painted in 1843.

Lund's and Eckersberg's paintings survived the fire at Christiansborg in 1884.

He is also well known for his altarpieces and paintings of religious themes, which were influenced by his admiration for such Renaissance painters as Fra Angelico, Perugino and Raphael.

His small landscapes also received favour from art historian, critic and advocate of a national art movement, Niels Lauritz Høyen. He painted few portraits. He designed the main curtain of the Royal Theatre (Det kongelige teater) with a view of the Acropolis in 1828, which still hangs to this day. A preliminary sketch of the project is in the Theatre Museum. The Royal Theatre owns other art pieces of his.

Early Italian art, his contact with the Nazarenes, fellow countryman and expatriate Bertel Thorvaldsen, and for romanticism's ideals, all left an indelible influence on his artistic production.

The Royal Library houses a collection of his letters, inclusive correspondence with younger artists that bears witness to his influence on them.

He is portrayed as an old man in a painting by one of his students, Professor August Schiøtt, a prodigious portraitist. This portrait, considered one of his best, led to Schiott's membership in the Academy in 1854.

Lund's works appear in various Danish art museums, including the Danish National Gallery (Statens Museum for Kunst). His works are also in the collections of several Danish castles, as well as religious works to be found at various Danish churches.

== See also ==
- List of Danish painters
