= Jes Bundsen =

Danish artist (1766–1829)

Jes Bundsen (16 September 1766 – 22 September 1829) was a Danish architectural and landscape painter and etcher.

== Life ==
Bundsen was born in Assens in 1766. He attended the Academy of Copenhagen in 1786, and then studied in Dresden, after which he became a teacher of drawing and a painter in Hamburg and Altona. He died at the latter town in 1829. He chiefly painted views in the vicinity of these places, as well as interiors of churches. He etched several plates in outline, and also practised lithography to some extent.

His brother was the architect Axel Bundsen.
