= Lüttichau =

German and Danish noble family

- Noble Family
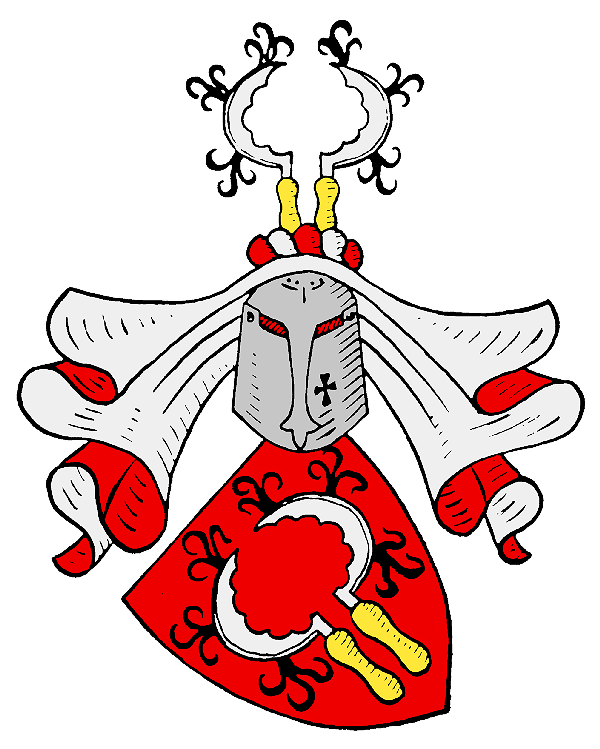
- Country: Denmark; Germany
- Founded: 1355; 671 years ago
- Founder: Heinrich Lütchow
- Titles: Count; Baron
- Style(s): Male-line descendants: "His Excellency"
- Estate(s): Tjele Estate; Søholt Manor; Møllerup Estate

The House of Lüttichau is an old German and Danish noble family that originated from Meissen, Saxony and belongs to the High Nobility. The family has several separate noble branches, primarily from Saxony, Denmark, Austria and Braunschweig. The Lüttichau family are amongst the largest landowners in Denmark today. Males of the family carry the title Baron or Imperial Count.

The Lüttichau family played a prominent role in Danish politics throughout the 19th century. The family owns several estates in Denmark, including Tjele Estate which has been in the possession of the family for 10 generations. The former Tjele Municipality was named after the Lüttichau family's seat there.

== Arms ==
The shield leads, on each side of three six-pointed gold stars accompanied by silver grain-seal in red field, on the helmet the same mark.

== Property ==
The Lüttichau family have owned and own several large estates which include:

Denmark

- Nivaagaard
- Engestofte
- Rohden Estate
- Ulriksdal Estate
- Store Grundet Estate
- Højgård Estate
- Lerkenfeldt Estate
- Vingegård Estate
- Møllerup Estate
- Tjele Estate
- Søholt

Germany

- Levitzow Manor Estate
- Wessin Manor Estate
- Alt Schwerin Manor Estate
- Poggelow Manor Estate
- Jamitzow Manor Estate
- Bärenstein Castle
- Großkmehlen Castle

== History ==
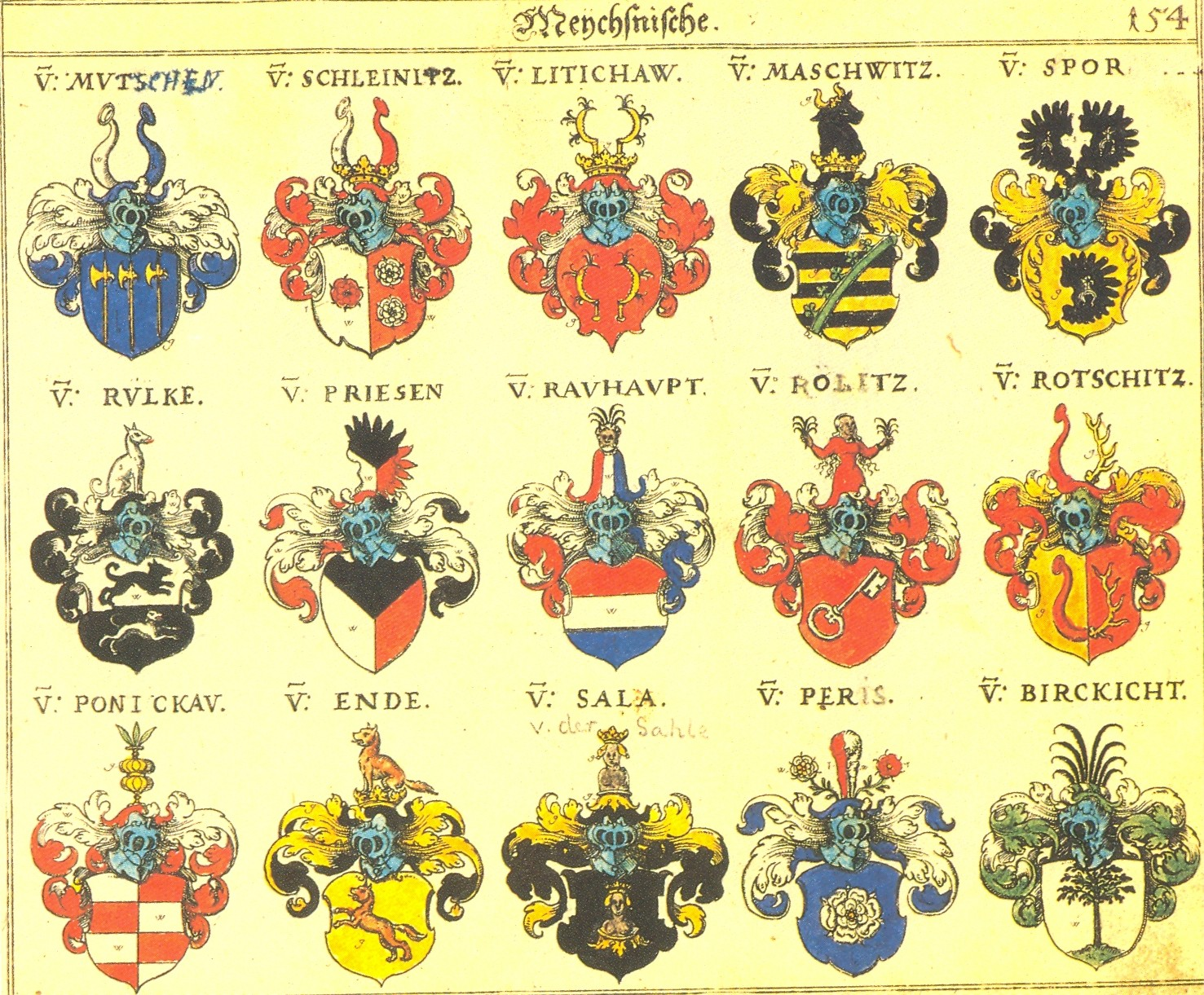
Lüttichau arms on the center top in Siebmachers Wappenbuch

The Lüttichau noble family was originally from Meissen and is named after the ancestral seat of Lüttichau near Königsbruch, which the family held during the 15th and 16th centuries. The oldest known document to reference the Lüttichau family comes the 12th century, and refers to an Elisabeth "ex antiqua et nobili familia Luttichorum" (English: from the ancient and noble family of the Lüttichau). The document describes Bishop Benno of Meissen healing Elizabeth through intercession.

The family line can be traced back to Heinrich von Lutchow (1330–1366). From Heinrich von Lutchow, the patriarchal family line is known to pass down to a Heinrich von Lüttichou (c. 1374), then Friedrich von Lüttichau (d. 1442), then his son Siegfried (Seyfert) von Lüttichau (d. 1496), then to Heinrich von Lüttichau (d. 1528), then Wolfgang von Lüttichau (1498–1568). Wolfgang was a chancellor and judge in Meissen. Through his second marriage he had two sons: Seyfert von Lüttichau (c. 1545—1605), a court master and magistrate in Senftenberg and Friedrich von Lüttichau (d. 1609). Seyfert's descendants continue to form the family's primary germanic line of descent, while Friedrich's establish the Danish line.

=== Germanic line ===
Through Seyfert von Lüttichau (c. 1545—1605), the germanic line (Kmehlen and Ulbersdorf), was established. Among his 12 children were: Wolff (1565–1639), an electoral magistrate and chancellor; Hannibal (c. 1570–1617); Nikolaus (1578–1632); and August (1585–1631).

- Count Ludwig Gottlob Lüttichau (1739–1813) was a descendant of Nikolaus von Lüttichau (1578–1632). He was appointed as an electoral chamberlain of Saxony in 1767, and in 1769 was granted the title of Imperial Count. He then became Landeshauptmann of Upper Lusatia in 1787. Ludwig Gottlob was married twice and had no descendants.
- Baron Rudolf Anton Karl Maximilian Lüttichau (1812–1876) was a chamberlain and colonel. He was a descendant of Nikolaus von Lüttichau (1578–1632). On 18 June 1865 he was granted status as a baron in Austria. His eldest son, Franz Rudolf (1846–1914), was chamberlain and council secretary of the District Court of Wels.
- Baron Friedrich August Kurt Lüttichau (1815–1888), was a descendant of Hannibal von Lüttichau (c. 1570–1617). His wife, Marthe-Louise de la Frenaye (1832–1899), was Chief Court Mistress to the Queen of Saxony. On 7 March 1877 he was granted status as a baron in Dresden.

=== Danish line ===
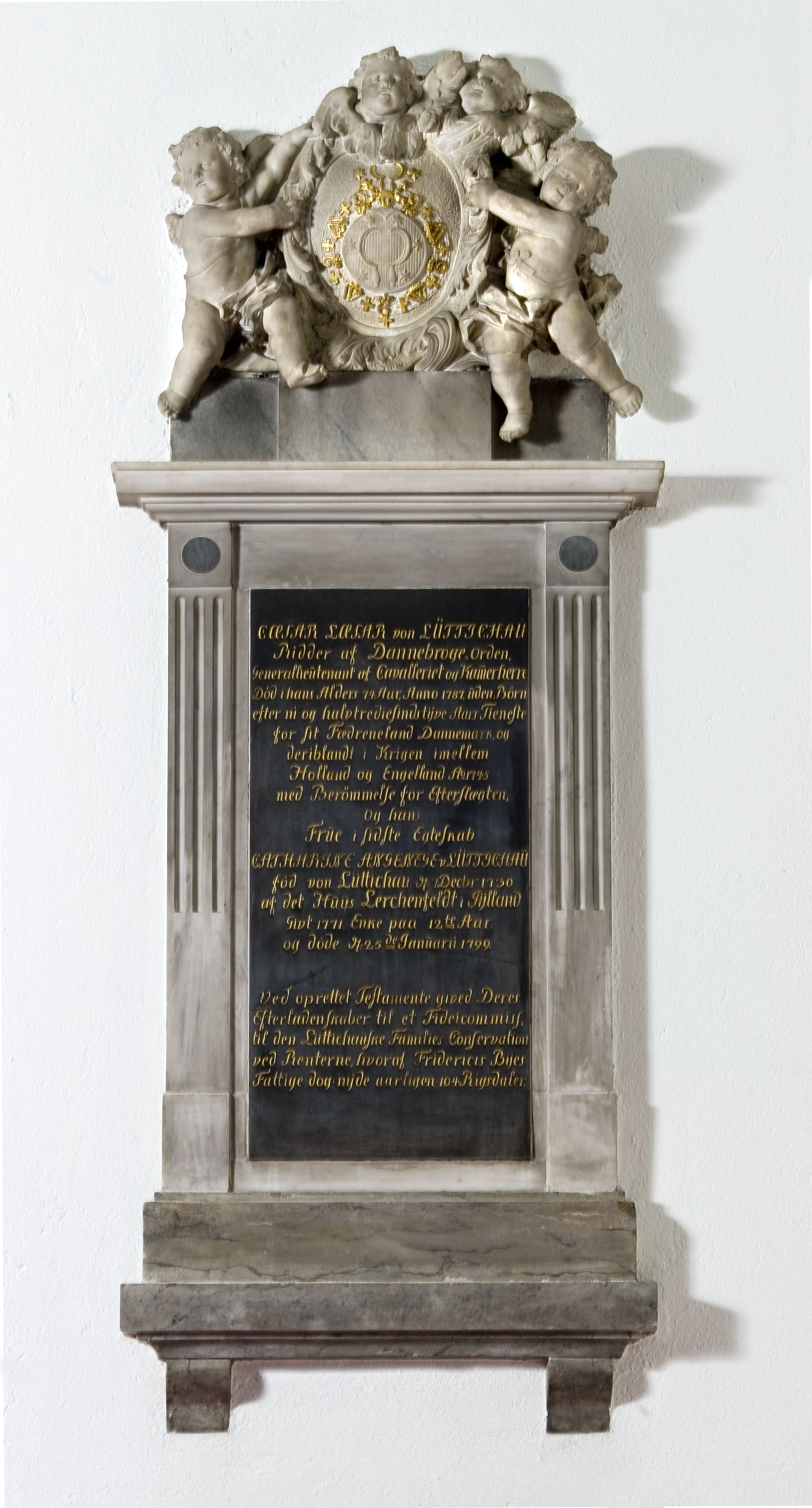
Epitaph (c. 1789) to Cæsar Læsar von Lüttichau in St. Nicolas' Church, Fredericia

The Danish Line stems from Wolfgang von Lüttichau's (1498–1568) second son, Friedrich von Lüttichau (d. 1609). Friedrich's son, Wolff Caspar von Lüttichau Sr., was then followed by Wolff Caspar von Lüttichau Jr. (d. 1677). Wolff Caspar Jr. served as the Upper Hofmeister in Mecklenburg and had two children through his second marriage, both of whom relocated to Denmark: Eleonore Marie von Lüttichau (b. 1669) and Hans Helmuth von Lüttichau (1670–1732). Eleonore Marie was Maid of the Bedchamber to Queen Louise, Chief Court Mistress to Princess Charlotte Amalie, and a member of the Ordre de l'Union Parfaite.

Lieutenant-general Hans Helmuth von Lüttichau (1670–1732) established the Danish line of the family. All of Hans Helmuth's sons became officers within the Danish military. He and his wife, Cathérine Agnès de Lézenne (b. 1671) had no fewer than six children: Major-general Christian Ditlev (1695–1767), Eleonore Elegarde (1690–1714), Eva Marie (1699–1750), Catharine Gottliebe (d. 1727), Major-general Wolff Caspar (1704–1765), and Lieutenant-general Cæsar Læsar (1709–1787). Hans Helmuth's eldest son, Christian Ditlev von Lüttichau (1695–1767), established the estates of Tjele and Vingegård in 1759, the former of which remains in the family's possession today.

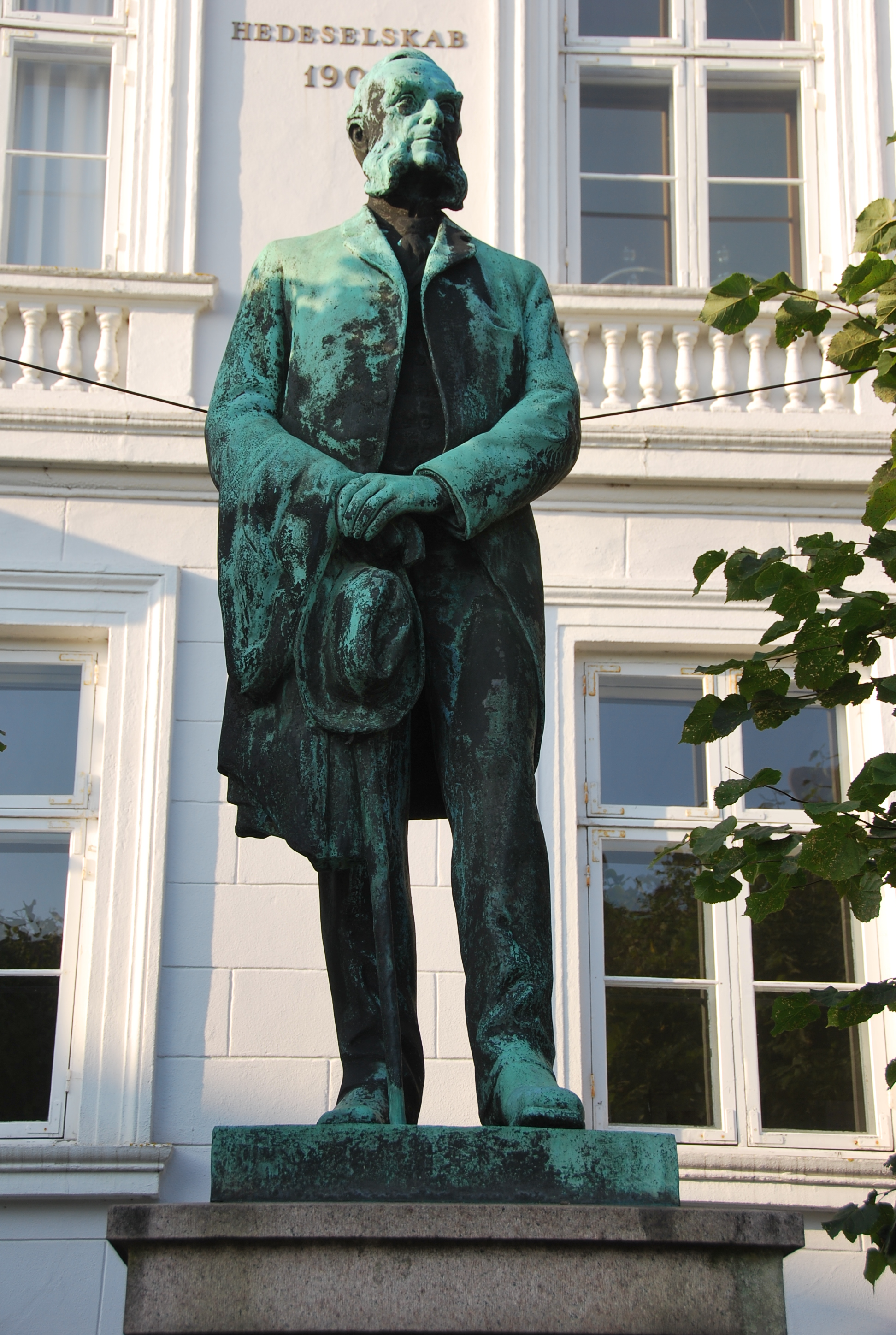
Statue of Christian Ditlev von Lüttichau (1832–1915) in front of Viborg Museum. Created by Anders Bundgaard, 1918.

On 25 January 1887, Christian Ditlev Lüttichau (1832–1915) secured a patent of nobility for he and his brothers which officially recognised them and their descendants as belonging to the Danish nobility. As such, he and his brother's descendants officially qualified as Danish nobles. Christian Ditlev served as Minister of Finance, Hofjægermester, Chamberlain, and Chairman of the Board of Hedeselskabet, an independent foundation. He married his wife, Margrethe Theresia Petrine Malvina Jessen (1835–1927) in 1860. The couple had seven children: Hans Helmuth Lüttichau (1868–1921), Christian Ditlev Lüttichau Jr. (1870–1951), Carl Vilhelm Lüttichau (b. 1871), Ida Malvina Margrethe Elenora (1872–1916), Selma Anna Sophie Elisabeth (1874–1911), Max Bernhard and Edvin Arnold (b. 1876, both died after birth).

Christian Ditlev's eldest brother, Hans Helmuth Lüttichau (1834–1889) was the owner of Viskum estate and a Hofjægermester. He was unmarried and had no descendants. His younger brother, Ulysses Constant Arnold Lüttichau (1847–1906) was a civil engineer employed on various works in France and also a Hofjægermester. He and his wife, Ellen Christine Elisabeth Ibsen (1861–1948) resided at the Vingegård estate and had four children: Max Bernhard (1892–1972), Kai Siegfried (1893–1921), Preben Mogens (b. 1895), and Curt Ulysses (1897–1991), an architect.

=== Imperial line ===
Count Christian Frederik Tønne von Lüttichau (1744–1805), was one of Major-general Christian Ditlev's (1695–1767) eleven children with his wife Helle Trolle Urne. As a young man, Christian Frederik Tønne had a military career. In 1768, he matriculated at the University of Göttingen and was granted a doctorate in law from Oxford University the same year. In 1791 he was granted the title of Imperial Count. As such, his descendants inherited his title as part of the imperial nobility. Through both of his marriages, Christian Frederik Tønne had a total of eighteen children. Of note are: Countess Helene Catherine Betty (1790–1841), Prioress of Roskilde Cathedral; Count Carl August Wilhelm Ferdinand (1792–1848), Prussian Colonel; Count Johann Baptist Heinrich Albrecht Wilhelm (1793–1858), Prussian Colonel; and Count Philipp Theodor (1795–1867), Prussian Lieutenant General.

=== Norwegian line ===
Descendant of the Danish line, Wolff Caspar von Lüttichau (1705–1765) had a son: Major Christian Cæsar (1745–1797), who possessed two estates: Lerkenfeldt and Ørndrup. Christian Cæsar's son, Wulff Caspar Frederik Lüttichau (1788–1831), was born near Farsø on the Lerkenfeldt Estate. He married Christine Jørgensen Vesterbye in 1811 and they settled in Norway together. Their descendants form the Norwegian line of the family. Of their eleven children, eight are known: Georgine Cæsarine Hortensia Lovisa (b. 1812), Emilie Marie (b. 1814), Caroline Marie (b. 1816), Marthe Christine Amalie (b. 1818), Ingeborg Marie Frederiche (b. 1818), Chrisitan Cæsar (1822–1850), Natalie (b. 1825), and Carl Ludvig Wilhelm (1829–1856).

An earlier ancestor, Hans Siegrfried von Lüttichau (d. 1644) was a mining official in Norway, and settled there. He was a great-grandson of the family patriarch, Heinrich von Lüttchau (1330—1366), and a son of Siegfried (Seyfert) von Lüttichau (d. 1496). Hans Siegrfried, however, left no known descendants in Norway.

== Notable descendants ==
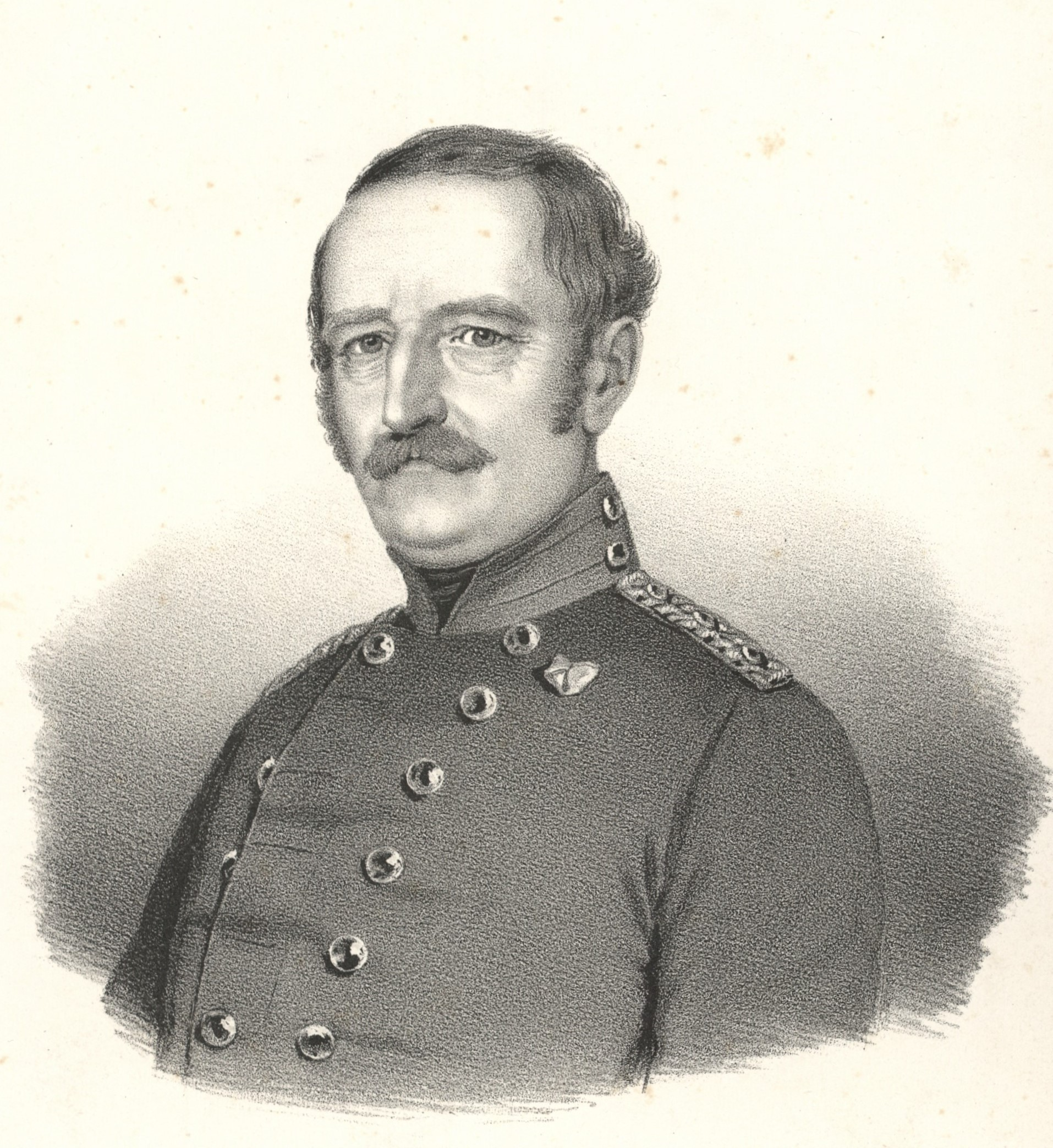
Mathias Lüttichau as Captain, illustrated by Emil Bærentzen by 1846

- Mathias Lüttichau
- Hannibal von Lüttichau
