= Danish Constituent Assembly =

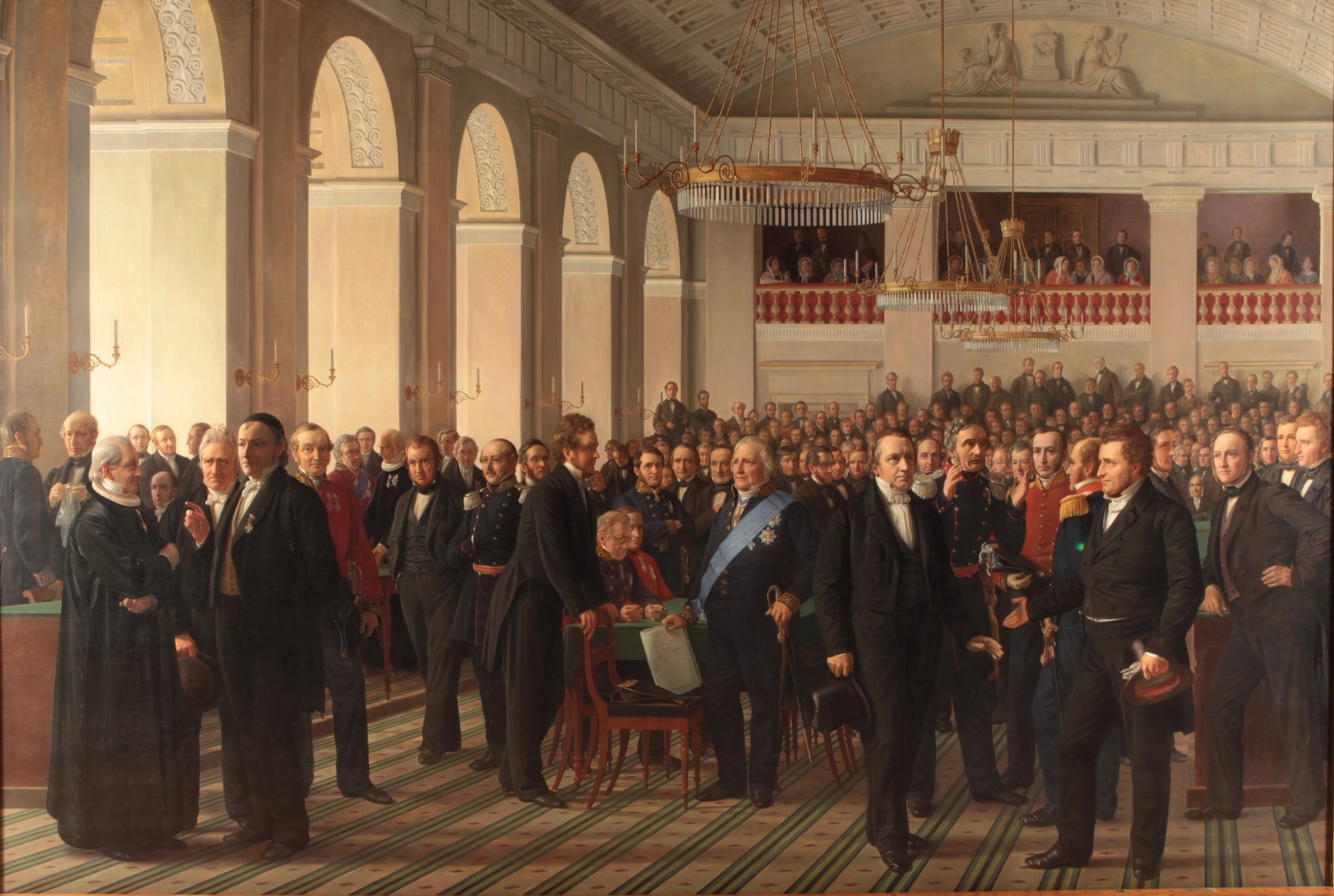
Constantin Hansen: The Danish Constituent Assembly (1864)

The Danish Constituent Assembly (Danish: Den Grundlovgivende Rigsforsamling) is the name given to the 1848 Constitutional assembly at Christiansborg Palace in Copenhagen that approved the Danish Constitution and formalized the transition from absolute monarchy to constitutional democracy. It consisted of members of which 114 were elected by the people, 38 were appointed by the king and the rest were government ministers.

The Danish Constituent Assembly first met on 23 October 1848.

== List of members ==
=== Copenhagen ===
1. Martin Hammerich, scholar and educator
2. Hans Peter Hansen, Bank of Denmark director
3. Anders Sandøe Ørsted, jurist
4. Tage Algreen-Ussing, procurator-general
5. William Frederik Duntzfelt, merchant and councilman
6. Carl Holger Visby, parish priest
7. Johannes Ephraim Larsen, professor
8. Harald Hartvig Kayser, master carpenter
9. Peter Pedersen, professor
10. Lauritz Nicolai Hvidt, merchant
11. Nicolai Elias Tuxen, military officer

=== Copenhagen County ===
1. Frederiksberg: Carl Christian Hall, chief auditor
2. Kongens Lyngby: Christian Flor, educator (replaced Henrik Leonhard Danchell, merchant, after the initial election was declared invalid)
3. Roskilde Kro: Carl Wilhelm Thalbitzer, landowner
4. Køge: Andreas Frederik Krieger, professor
5. Roskilde: Lorents Lorck, parish priest
6. Blæsenborg: Peder Hansen, farmer

=== Frederiksborg County ===
1. Helsingør: Jacob Baden Olrik, town bailiff
2. Esrum: Johan Christian Drewsen, industrialist
3. Ramløse: Edouard Buntzen, attorney
4. Frederikssund: Rasmus Nielsen Møller, crofter
5. Slangerup: Hans Johansen, farmer and parish bailiff
6. Hillerød: Johannes Andreas Ostermann, teacher

=== Holbæk County ===
1. Holbæk: Niels Ludvig Westergaard, professor
2. Tvede Kro: Jens Gregersen, copyholder
3. Vedby Kro: Asmund Gleerup, teacher
4. Kalundborg: Niels Frederik Jespersen, captain
5. Faurbo Kro: N.H. Nielsen, farmer
6. Nykøbing Sjælland: Nicolai Andreasen, miller

=== Sorø County ===
1. Ringsted: Lars Andersen Hækkerup, copyholder
2. Sorø: Carl Emil Mundt, scholar
3. Holløse: Frederik Frølund, theologian
4. Skælskør: Christen Christensen Møller, institution manager
5. Slagelse: Carl de Neergaard, landowner
6. Korsør: Frederik Engelhardt Boisen, parish priest

=== Præstø County ===
1. Store Heddinge: Lars Hansen, farmer
2. Rønnede: Frederik Johannsen, miller
3. Vallø: Hans Egede Schack, jurist
4. Præstø: Hans Hansen, weaver (replaced by N.F.S. Grundtvig, priest)
5. Vordingborg: Christian Schroll, farmer
6. Næstved: Mikkel Rasmussen, farmer and parish bailiff
7. Stege: Frederik Barfod, student

=== Odense County ===
1. Odense: Caspar Paludan-Müller, teacher
2. Højby: Cornelius Petersen, farmer
3. Vissenbjerg: Niels Madsen, farmer
4. Assens: Hans Dinesen, farmer
5. Middelfart: Albert Leth, parish priest
6. Bogense: Frederik Jespersen, procurator
7. Søndersø: Hans Christian Johansen (politician), farmer
8. Kerteminde: Christen Larsen, copyholder

=== Svendborg County ===
1. Rudkøbing: Jens Andersen Hansen, teacher
2. Tranekær: Jens Rasmussen Jacobsen, farmer
3. Svendborg: Jens Christian Colding, medical doctor
4. Nyborg: Frederik Schiern, educator
5. Kværndrup: Hans Christensen, farmer
6. Korinth Kro: Jens Rasmussen, farmer
7. Sønder Bråby: Knud Christian Høier, copyholder

=== Maribo County ===
1. Nakskov: Balthazar Christensen, lawyer
2. Juellinge: Christen Blach, farmer
3. Maribo: Georg Aagaard, prokurator
4. Sakskøbing: Hans Olesen, farmer
5. Nykøbing Falster: Mouritz Mørk Hansen
6. Stubbekøbing: Hans Rasmussen, farmer

=== Bornholms County ===
1. Rønne: A.S. Stender, jurist
2. Aakirkeby: Johan Nicolai Madvig, professor (replaced by J.W. Marckmann after being appointed as government minister)

=== Aalborg County ===
1. Nørresundby: Anders Jensen Hjort, estate manager
2. Aalborg: Jens Christopher Schurmann, parish priest
3. Bælum: Anders Jungersen, teacher
4. Brorstrup: Christen Eriksen, farmer
5. Nibe: Christian Magdalus Jespersen, landsoverretsprokurator

=== Hjørring County ===
1. Frederikshavn: Severin Hastrup, farmer
2. Sæby: Hans Peter Theilmann, estate manager
3. Hjørring: Johannes Christopher Nyholm, landowner
4. Jerslev: Hans Christian Pape, landowner
5. Vrejlev: Ludvig Christian Brinck-Seidelin, landowner
6. Halvrimmen: Johan Nicolai Frederik Hasselbalch, farmer

=== Thisted County ===
1. Bjerget: Ulrik Christian Frederik Aagaard, county manager
2. Thisted: Hans Ditlev Lützhøft, agent
3. Vestervig: Frederik Christian von Haven, parish priest
4. Nykøbing Mors: Christian Erhard Bagger, parish priest

=== Viborg County ===
1. Skive: Bertel Nørgaard, farmer
2. Viborg: Laurids Nørgaard Bregendahl, overretsassessor
3. Levring: Mads Pagh Bruun, industrialist
4. Søndervinge: Henrik Wellejus Jacobæus, farmer
5. Løvel: Werner Jaspar Andreas Ussing, overretsassessor

=== Aarhus County ===
1. Odder: Geert Winther, magister
2. Aarhus: Christian Rasmus Otterstrøm, bank teller
3. Skjoldelev: Torkild Christian Dahl, overretsprokurator and landowner

=== Skanderborg County ===
1. Horsens: Ditlev Ræder, mayor
2. Skanderborg: Frederik Vilhelm Schytte, oil miller
3. Bræstrup: Niels Hunderup, bailiff
4. Linå: Michael Drewsen, industrialist

=== Randers County ===
1. Mariager: Joakim Frederik Schouw, professor
2. Randers: Ingvard Henrik Linnemann, teacher
3. Estrup: Carl Emil Dahlerup, auditor
4. Grenaa: Peter Christian la Cour, priest
5. Ebeltoft: Peter Daniel Bruun, Supreme Court justice
6. Voldum: Bernhard Rée, editor and merchant

=== Vejle County ===
1. Fredericia: Peter Georg Bang, amtmand (replaced by Peter Carl Christian Holck after being appointed as government minister)
2. Kolding: Carl Ploug, editor
3. Vejle: William Walker Stockfleth, bailiff
4. Give: Anders Hermansen, farmer
5. Konstantia: Jens Jørgensen, politician
6. Bjerre: Jesper Peter With, bailiff

=== Ringkjøbing County ===
1. Ringkøbing: Andreas Evald Meinert Tang, landowner
2. Lemvig: Ole Kirk, farmer
3. Holstebro: Carl Nicolai Petersen, bailiff
4. Herning: Jens Fløe, diocesan inspector
5. Skjern: Jens Petersen, teacher

=== Ribe County ===
1. Varde: Christopher Leberecht Tobiesen, provost
2. Hjerting: Hans Christian Nielsen, farmer
3. Ribe: Peter Hansen Tvede, procurator
4. Steensvanggård: Niels Hansen, teacher
5. Bredebro: Caspar Frederik Gram, priest

=== Members appointed by the king ===
1. Carl Christopher Georg Andræ, military officer
2. Hans Peter Bergmann, veterinarian
3. Vilhelm Bjerring, professor
4. Hans Brøchner Bruun, merchant
5. Preben Lihme Brandt, textile manufacturer
6. S.A.M. Buchwald, merchant
7. Christian Cederfeld de Simonsen, stamhusbesidder
8. Georg Christensen, gunsmith
9. Jens Christensen, farmer
10. Henrik Nicolai Clausen, professor (replaced by Frederik Markus Knuth after he was appointed as government minister)
11. Christian Georg Nathan David, professor
12. Carl Edvard van Dockum, naval officer (later Christian Albrecht Bluhme)
13. Jacob Scavenius Fibiger, military officer
14. Thomas Funder, tobacco manufacturer
15. Hother Hage, jurist
16. Christian Sehestedt Juul, chamberlain
17. Schack Lüneberg Køster, councilman
18. Mathias Lüttichau, chamberlain
19. Tage Christian Müller, Bishop of Ribe
20. Jacob Peter Mynster, Bishop of Zealand
21. Niels Ostenfeldt, hospital director
22. Waldemar Tully Oxholm, military officer and courtier
23. Børge Petersen, hatter
24. Peder Brønnum Scavenius, landowner
25. Carl Otto Emil Schlegel, military officer
26. Knud Sidenius, merchant
27. Jørgen Erik Frederik Skeel, chamberlain
28. Wilhelm Carl Eppingen Sponneck (replaced Anton Frederik Tscherning after he was appointed as government minister)
29. Frederik Treschow, konferensråd
30. Frederik Wulff, city treasurer
31. Christian Frederik Zeuthen, baron
32. Caspar Frederik Wegener, secretary archivist
33. Jon Gudmundson, student (Iceland)
34. Konráð Gíslason, educator (Iceland)
35. Jon Johnsen, byfoged (Iceland)
36. Brynjolf Pjeturson, kongelig fuldmægtig (Iceland)
37. Jón Sigurðsson, kandidat (Iceland)
38. Christian Pløyen, amtmand (Faroe Islands)

=== Ministers of the March Cabinet and November Cabinet ===
- Carl Emil Bardenfleth, Minister of Justice
- Christian Frederik Hansen, Minister of War
- Adam Wilhelm Moltke, Prime Minister
- Ditlev Gothard Monrad, Kultus Minister
- Carl Scheel-Plessen, Minister for Schleswig
- Christian Christopher Zahrtmann, Minister of the Navy
