= Hans Brøchner Bruun =

Danish politician

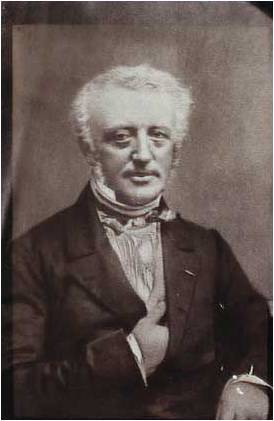
- Photo of Brøchner Bruun, c. 1860

Danish Constituent Assembly
- In office 1848–1849
- Appointed by: Frederick VII of Denmark

Roskilde Provincial Assembly
- In office 1835–1848

Personal details
- Born: June 18, 1793 Fredericia, Denmark
- Died: April 1, 1863 (aged 69) Assens, Denmark
- Awards: Order of the Dannebrog (1840)

Hans Brøchner Bruun (18 July 1793 – 1 April 1863) was a Danish merchant and politician. He ran a large trading house in Assens on the island of Funen. He was by royal appointment a member of the 1848 Danish Constituent Assembly.

== Career ==
In 1826 Bruun took over the operation of the ferry service from Assens on Funen. His youngest brother, Søren Wedege Bruun, ran a trading house in the same town. Bruun continued the firm after his brother's early death in 1837. The company, N. M. & F. Plum, developed into one of the largest trading houses in the Danish provinces.

Bruun chaired Assens Town Council from 1839 to 1857. He was elected for Roskilde Provincial Assembly in 1835–48 as a representative of the smaller market towns in Odense County. In 1840, he was made a Knight of the Order of the Dannebrog.

Although he was absent at the 1844 assembly, and was appointed for the 1848 Danish Constituent Assembly by the king.

== Personal life ==
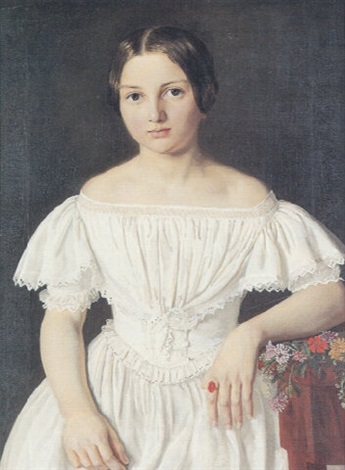
Portrait of Brøchner's daughter Marie Sophie Bruun, 1939

Bruun was born in Fredericia, the son of Bertel Bruun (1767–1827) and Magdalene Barbara Brøchner (1768–1831). He received a commercial education in his father's company. His father was the owner of several successful factories in Viborg and Fredericia.

Bruun married Hanne Antonie Jacobine Christiane Plum (17 February 1798 – 19 January 1878), a daughter of parish priest, and later bishop, Frederik Plum (1760–1834) and Marie Sophia Munk (1765–1829), on 6 June 1818 in Odense. They had the following children:

- Bertel Bruun (22 January 1820 – 6 August 1894)
- Marie Sophie Bruun (22 November 1822 – 26 November 1847)
- Frederik Plum Bruun (1824)
- Magdalene Barbara Bruun (1827)
- Hanne Antonie Bruun (1832-1833)
