= Peter Willemoes =

Danish naval officer

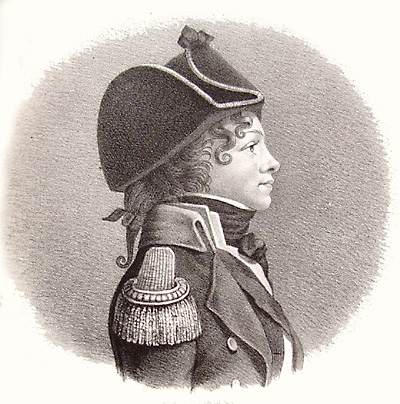
- Born: 11 May 1783; Assens, Denmark
- Died: 22 March 1808 (aged 24); Great Belt, Denmark
- Burial place: Odden Cemetery, Zealand
- Military career
- Allegiance: Denmark–Norway
- Branch: Royal Danish Navy
- Rank: Lieutenant
- Conflicts: Battle of Copenhagen; Battle of Zealand Point

Lieutenant Peter Willemoes (11 May 1783 – 22 March 1808) was a Royal Danish Navy officer. He died in the Battle of Zealand Point. He is commemorated by a statue on the harbourfront in his native town of Assens. Willemoes was born on 11 May 1783 in Assens on the island of Funen, where his father was a public servant. At the age of twelve he was sent to the Naval Academy in Copenhagen. He became a cadet in 1795 and sekondløjtnant (second lieutenant) in 1800.

== Career ==
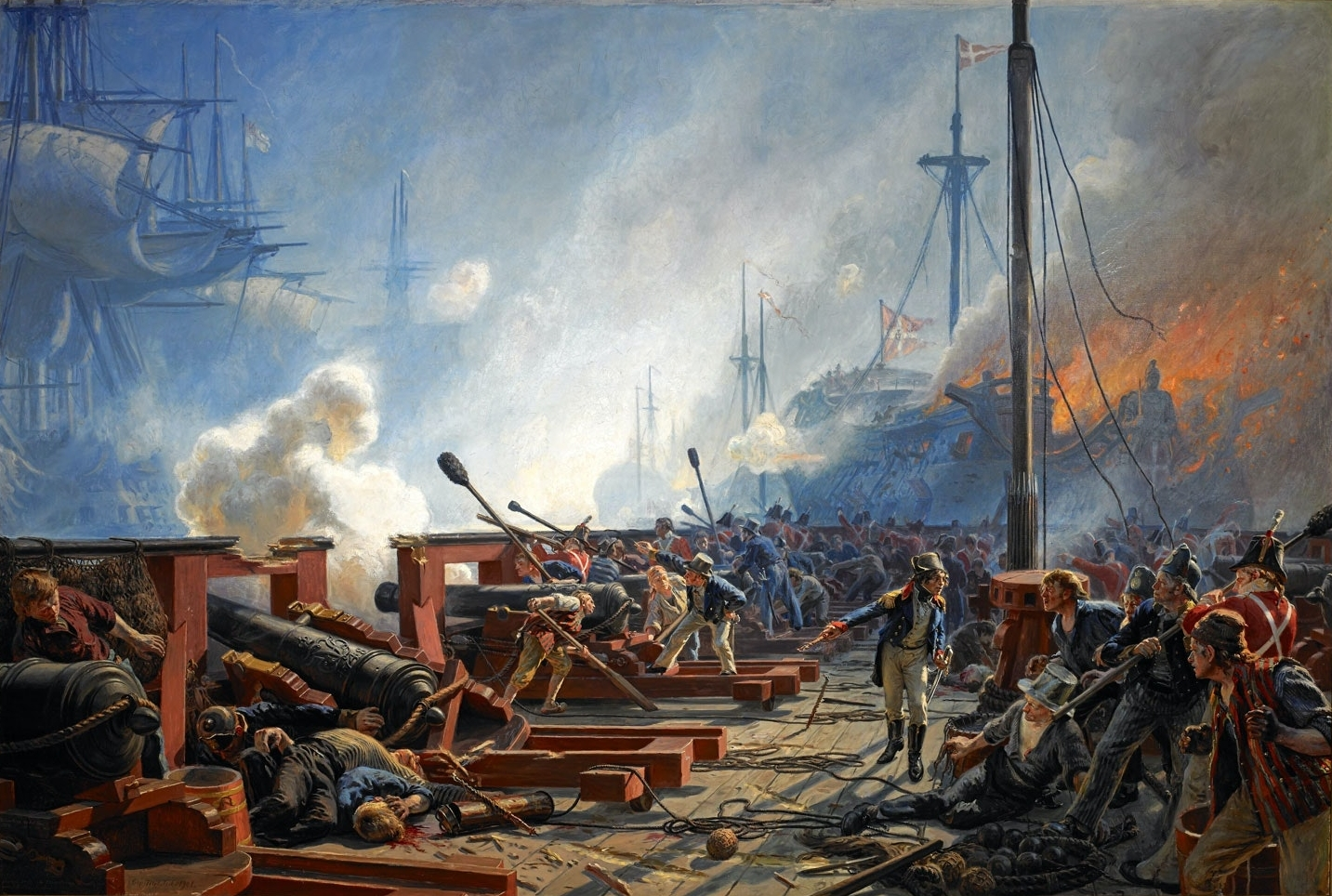
Willemoes (centre-right) at the Battle of Copenhagen

At seventeen he commanded a floating battery, "Flaadebatteri Nr. 1", during the Battle of Copenhagen on 2 April 1801. After the battle, Willemoes became a member of the Danish Order of Freemasons before setting off to the Mediterranean Sea aboard the frigate Rota.

After his return to Denmark, he began to study law but discontinued his studies in 1807 to briefly go into Russian service.

After the 1801 Battle of Copenhagen where the British captured most of the Danish navy, he returned to Denmark in 1807, where he enrolled on Prinds Christian Frederik, the only remaining Danish ship-of-the-line. On 22 March 1808, in the Battle of Zealand Point, the ship was driven onto a sandbar in order to prevent its capture by the British. Willemoes was among the 69 Danish casualties, hit by a bullet to his head, and was afterwards buried at Odden Cemetery.
