= Assens, Denmark =

Assens
- Town
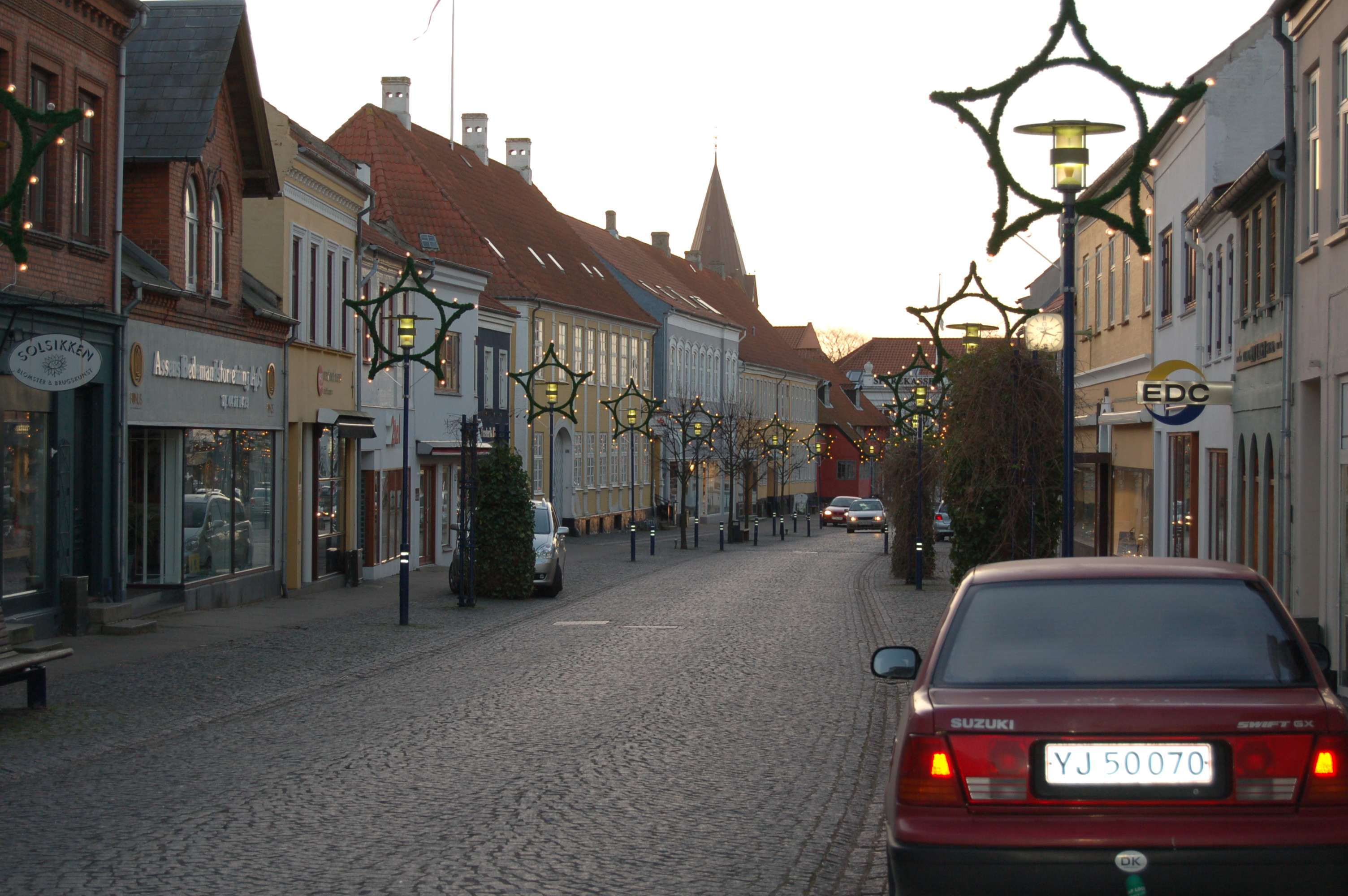

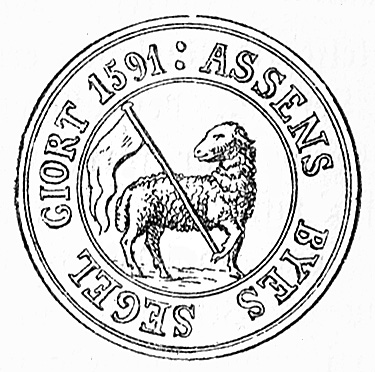
- Seal Coat of arms

- Location within Denmark Location within Region of Southern Denmark
- Coordinates: 55°16′N 9°54′E
- Country: Denmark
- Region: Southern Denmark (Syddanmark)
- Municipality: Assens

Area
  - Urban: 4.7 km^{2} (1.8 sq mi)

Population (2026)
  - Urban: 5,817
  - Urban density: 1,200/km^{2} (3,200/sq mi)
  - Gender: 2,808 males and 3,009 females
- Time zone: UTC+1 (CET)
  - Summer (DST): UTC+2 (CEST)
- Postal code: DK-5610 Assens

Assens (Danish: [ˈæsn̩s]) is a town with a population of 5,817 (1 January 2026) on the west coast of the island of Funen on the eastern side of the Little Belt in central Denmark. By road, Assens is located 41.2 kilometres (25.6 mi) southwest of Odense, 34 kilometres (21 mi) northwest of Faaborg, and 33.34 kilometres (20.72 mi) southeast of Middelfart. Assens is the municipal seat of Assens Municipality in Region of Southern Denmark. It was the birthplace of sculptor Jens Adolf Jerichau who married the well-known portraitist Elisabeth Jerichau-Baumann; both artists' works are exhibited at the local art museum, Vestfyns Kunstmuseum.

== Etymology ==
In the Danish Census Book from the 13th century, Assens is listed with the name Asnæs, which means a promontory overgrown with ash trees.

== History ==
Assens is located on the site of an old ferry landing linking Funen and the south of Jutland. A bay provided a natural harbour while the Little Belt encouraged trade and transport. It probably became a market town in the 13th century. The ferry, which probably originated in the Middle Ages, became particularly significant in the 16th century with sizeable cattle exports. The town was hard hit by the Swedish Wars in the 17th century, causing a reduction in trade. It nevertheless continued to be the main ferry link between Jutland and Funen.

Prosperity returned at the end of the 18th century, increasing in the 19th century after a new harbour was completed in 1822. However the railway to Middelfart in 1865 provided considerable competition but the town suffered above all from the discontinuation of the ferry service after Southern Jutland was lost to the Germans in 1864.

At the end of the 19th century, there were few industries in Assens, the main source of income still being trade and crafts. In 1884, however, the railway to Tommerup linked Assens to Odense and in 1885, the harbour was extended with a new dock. A sugar factory was established, providing over 300 jobs by the end of the century. There was also a marked increase in population.

With reunification after the First World War, the ferry to Southern Jutland was reopened and ran until 1972. The sugar factory remained the main source of employment but a number of smaller metal foundries and food companies were established. Like most of Funen's other towns, Assens remained in the shadow of Odense, recording only modest growth. Its population grew only slightly, from around 4,600 in 1901 to 5,800 in 2004.

== Economy ==
Today the town still has a small shipyard, a few metallurgical and chemical factories and the Vestfyen brewery. The sugar factory was closed in 2006. In 2007, the public sector benefited from Assens position as the seat of the new Assens Municipality. Companies headquartered in Assens Municipality include the Carl Hansen & Søn furniture manufacturer in Aarup.

== Landmarks ==
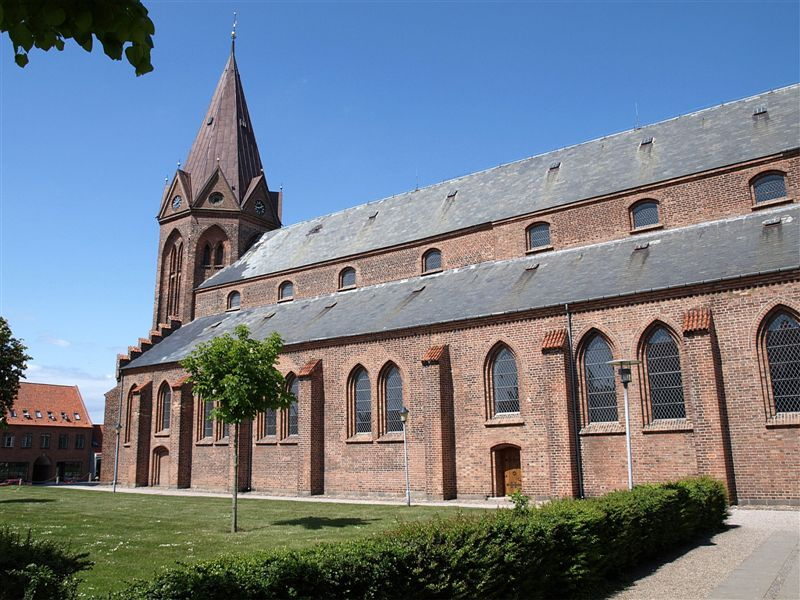
Assens Church

Assens Church (Vor Frue Kirke) is the second largest church building on the island of Funen. Built in the 15th century on the site of a former Romanesque church, the red-brick building was comprehensively restored in the 19th century. It bears the influence of north German Gothic architecture. The tower with its octagonal base and spire is 48 m (157 ft) in height. The altarpiece and pulpit are from the 17th century.

Willemoesgården, one of the oldest houses in the town, was the birthplace of Peter Willemoes (1783–1808) who became a celebrity after heroic action in the Battle of Copenhagen. The building is now a museum with exhibits on the history of the town and its seafaring heritage.

Assens Marina with 600 berths including a quay for visitors is located next to the local camping facility and sports centre with shops and a restaurant. It is open from May until the end of August.

== Notable people ==
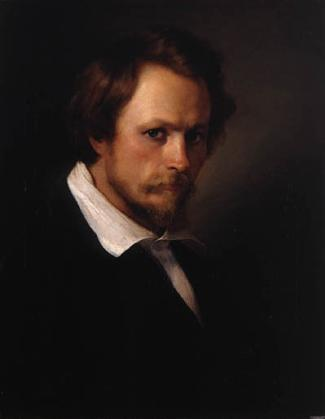
JA Jerichau, 1846

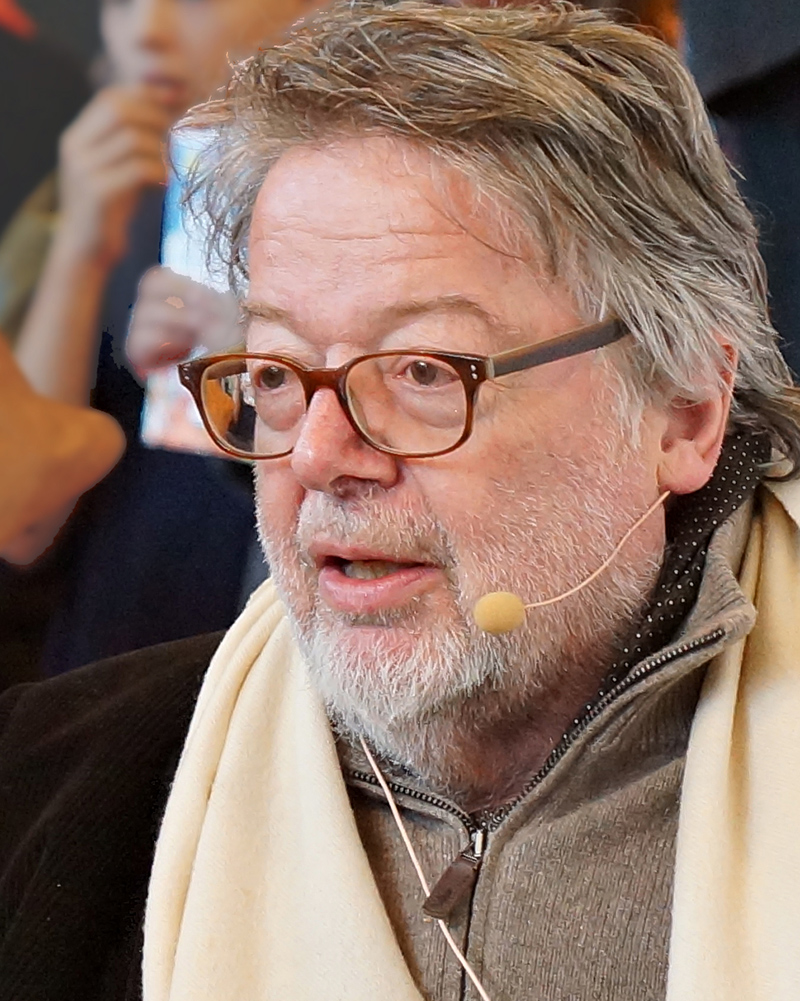
Peter Brandes, 2014

- Peder Lauridsen Kylling (c. 1640 in Assens – 1696) a Danish botanist
- Christian Thomsen Carl (1676 in Assens - 1713) a Danish naval officer
- Hans Næss (1723 in Næs – 1795) a Danish neoclassical architect of manor houses
- Steen Andersen Bille (1751 in Assens – 1833) a Danish naval officer, became an Admiral
- Peter Willemoes (1783 in Assens – 1808) a Danish naval officer, said to be of indominitable good cheer, courage and good looks
- Hans Brøchner Bruun (1793–1863) merchant and politician, chaired Town Council 1839/1857
- Carl Christian Rafn (1795 in Brahesborg, near Assens – 1864) a historian, translator and antiquarian.
- Benny Cederfeld de Simonsen (1865 in Brahesborg, near Assens – 1952) a Danish peace activist.
- John Eriksen (1957 in Assens – 2002) a Danish footballer, 479 caps and 17 caps for Denmark

=== The arts ===
- Jes Bundsen (1766 in Assens – 1829) a Danish landscape painter and etcher
- Dankvart Dreyer (1816 in Assens – 1852) a landscape painter of the Copenhagen School
- Jens Adolf Jerichau (1816 in Assens – 1883) a sculptor, moved away from Neoclassicism
- Thorvald Niss (1842 in Assens – 1905) a landscape painter, joined the Skagen Painters
- Kirsten Passer (1930 in Nårup – 2012) a Danish film actress
- Peter Brandes (born 1944 in Assens) a painter, sculptor, ceramic artist and photographer
- Anne Øland (1949 in Assens – 2015) a Danish concert pianist and educator
