= Dankvart Dreyer =

Danish artist (1816–1852)

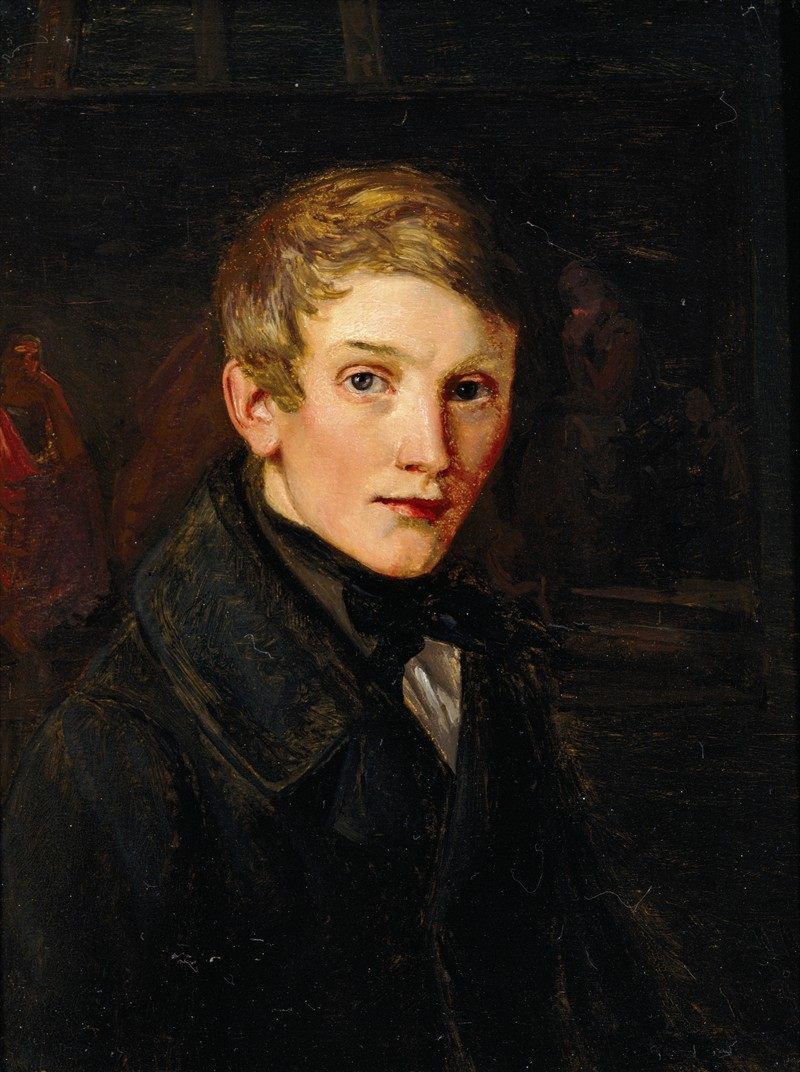
- Dankvart Dreyer, Self-portrait, 1838
- Born: 13 June 1816; Assens, Denmark
- Died: 4 November 1852 (aged 36); Assens, Denmark
- Education: Royal Danish Academy of Fine Arts
- Known for: Painting
- Movement: Danish Golden Age, National Romanticism

Dankvart Dreyer (13 June 1816 – 4 November 1852) was a Danish landscape painter of the Copenhagen School of painters who was educated under the guidance of Christoffer Wilhelm Eckersberg. Around 1840, he was part of the emerging National Romantic landscape painting scene in Denmark but as a result of his over-dramatic and excessively natural style, he did not fit the aesthetics and the ideology of the period. After being widely criticized, he turned his back on the artistic establishment and passed into near oblivion. In 1852, when only 36 years old, he died from typhus.

Posthumously, half a century after his death, his reputation was restored, prompted by the art historian Karl Madsen, and today he is considered to be one of the leading Danish landscape painters of his day, the peer of his more famous contemporaries P. C. Skovgaard and Johan Lundbye.

== Early life and education ==
As the youngest of 15 children, Dankvart Dreyer was born on 13 June 1816 in Assens on the Danish island of Funen. His parents were Jørgen Christian Dreyer, a successful merchant who had been the richest man in town until the national bankruptcy in 1813, and his third wife Caroline Dorthea (née Møller). Dankvart soon showed a gift for drawing. Another boy in Assens at that time, born the same year as Dankvart, was Jens Adolf Jerichau, who also was to become a prominent artist. He later commented on young Dreyer's remarkable gifts and dedication: "While I was fooling around with the other boys, he would be sitting at home with his mother and sister drawing, and you can hardly imagine anyone with a greater disposition for art than that boy."

Dreyer's godfather therefore saw to it that in 1831, at the age of 15, the boy was sent to Copenhagen to study at the Royal Danish Academy of Fine Arts. Under the supervision of his professors, J. L. Lund and Christoffer Wilhelm Eckersberg, he trained to become a history painter, the most prestigious artistic discipline at that time, and also painted some portraits. He was talented and successful, winning several awards before he turned 21.

== Turn to landscaping ==
Dreyer also had private lessons with Christen Købke, another professor at the Academy. He also met a group of fellow Academy students who were studying landscape painting, still a relatively unappreciated discipline at the Academy. Among them were P. C. Skovgaard and Johan Lundbye who became his close friends and inspired him to take still more interest in landscaping. Alone or together with them, he made frequent excursions to the countryside north of Copenhagen, particularly the area around Fredensborg and Jægersborg Dyrehave. There he made detailed sketches and studies of nature.

== Painting the other Denmark ==
=== Funen and Brandsø ===
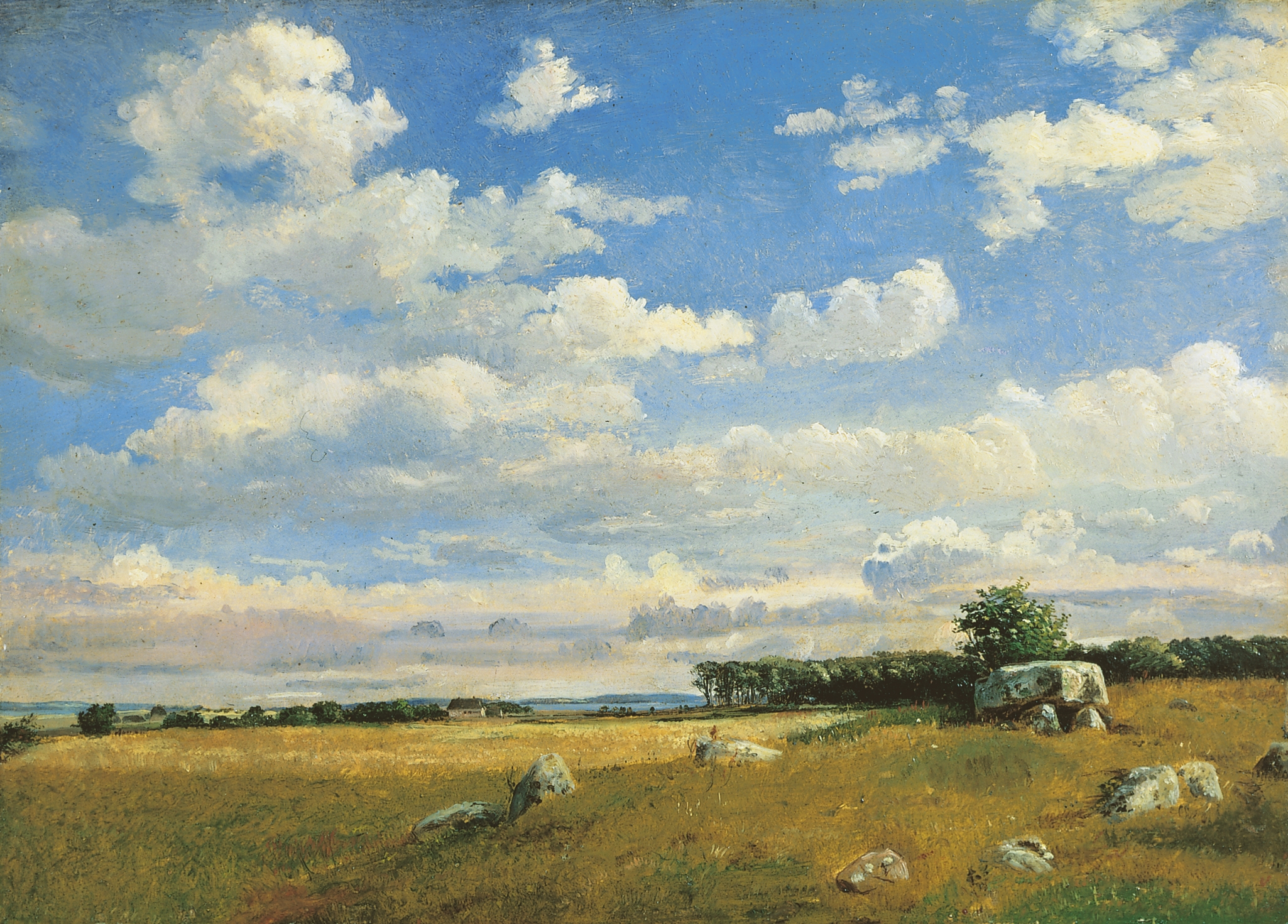
Dolun on Brandsø, The Hirschsprung Collection.

Unlike most of his contemporaries, Dreyer never went abroad to further his studies, although he applied for travel scholarships on three occasions. Instead, he travelled widely in Denmark. His native island of Funen remained a focal point for his artistic attention throughout his career, particularly the area around Assens where he had grown up. A place of particular importance to him was the small manor house of Rugaard which he visited almost every summer from 1837 to 1847 to paint. Several times he also sought out the small island of Brandsø in the Little Belt, the narrow strait between Funen and Jutland, where he found a near perfect landscape to his liking with dolmens and distant coasts.

=== Across Jutland ===
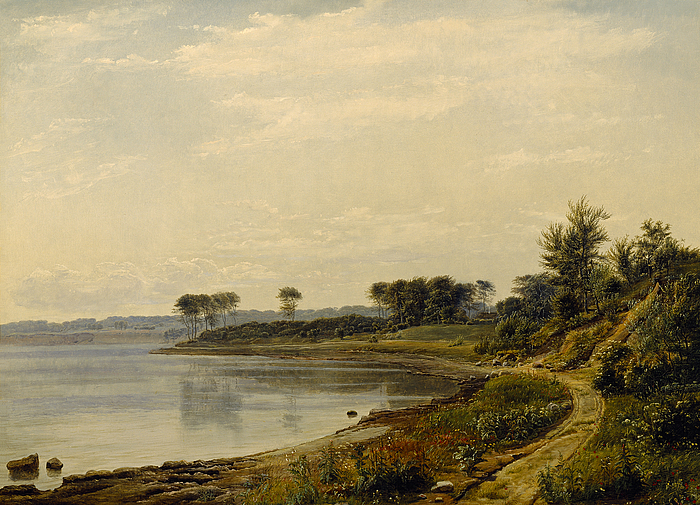
The coast near Aarhus, c. 1839.

Dreyer's appetite for exploring the provinces also brought him to Jutland, a rare destination for painters at the time. He was the first to paint the gentle landscapes along the east coast or the moors of central Jutland. Martinus Rørbye, often described as the most adventurous of the Danish Golden Age painters, had visited Jutland on the way to Norway back in 1830 and made it all the way to remote district of Thy in north-western Jutland. However, he had found the landscape unsuitable for painting due to the lack of trees. This did not bother Dreyer who had been struck by the short stories of Steen Steensen Blicher, a distant relative of his. Blicher's descriptions of the stark beauty of the vast, brown-colored heaths of mid Jutland, of its people and almost exotic dialects, had a mesmerizing effect on the painter. Dreyer first visited the east coast around Aarhus in 1838 and later that year he was present when Blicher arranged his first National Awakening Meeting at Himmelbjerget. He went on to paint the heath and, when he returned in 1843, he went all the way to the west coast.

== The emerging National Romantic landscape era ==
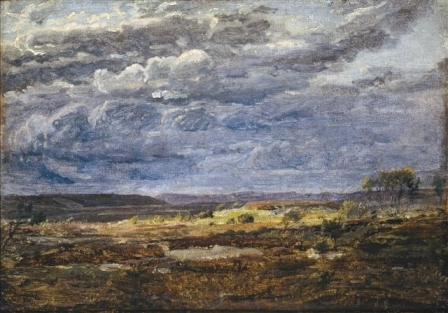
Heath landscape in Jutland, nascent storm, c. 1839.

In the years around 1840, the influential art historian and critic Niels Laurits Høyen campaigned for nationalistic art, reflecting a tendency which was seen all over Europe. In Denmark, people enthusiastically read Bernhard Severin Ingemann's historic novels and Adam Oehlenschläger while N. F. S. Grundtvig's sermons were drawing large crowds. According to Høyen, painters, too, should contribute to this national awakening. Instead of turning to the Mediterranean area, its landscapes and its people, and to classical mythology, for inspiration, they should paint what defined their native Denmark: the Danish landscape and its people, Danish history, and Norse mythology.

Lundbye, Sjovgaard and Dankvart had for years preferred Danish subjects and became the leading proponents of the emerging era of National Romantic painting.

== Adversity and withdrawal ==
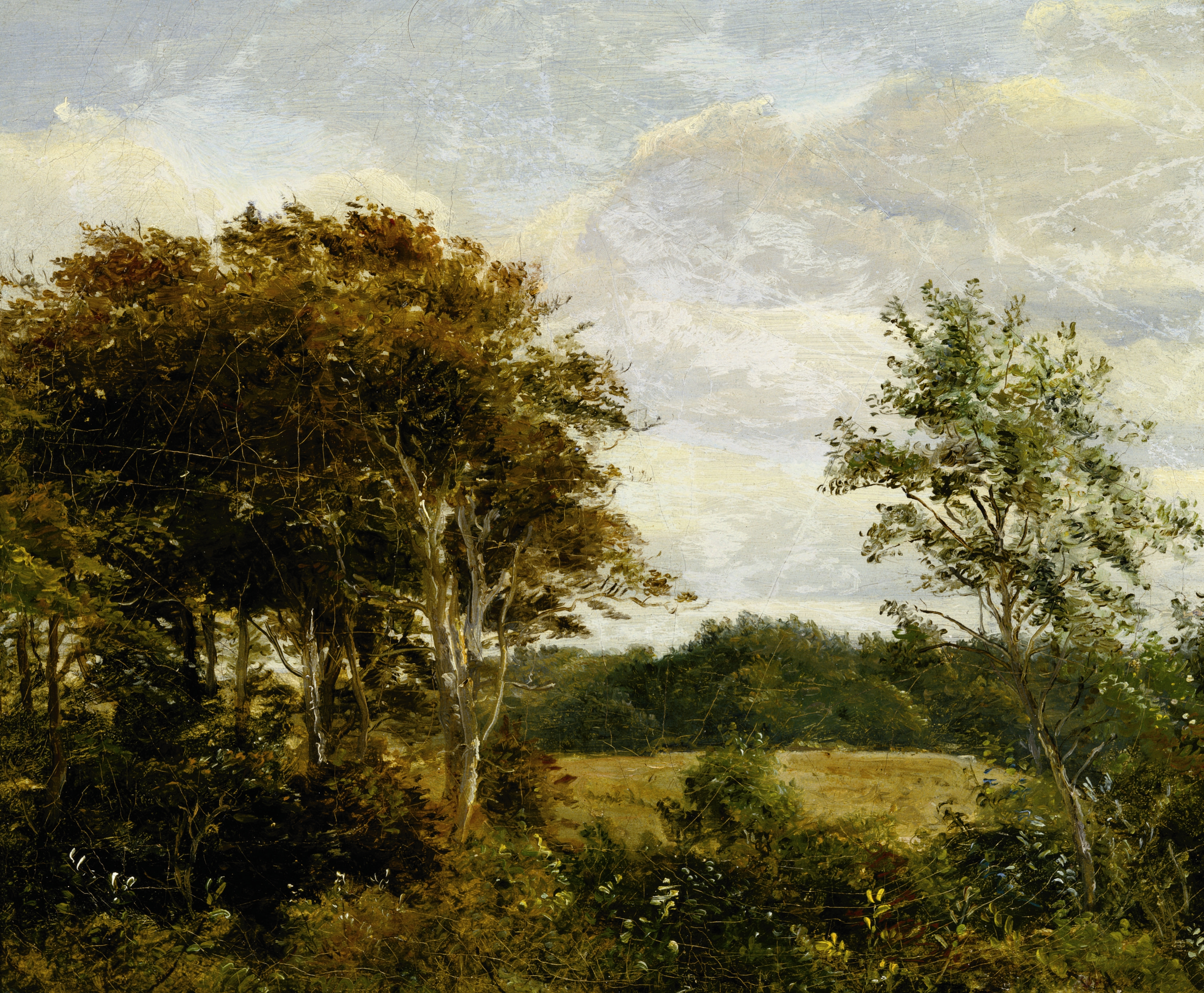
A glade in a forest, 1838.

However, as time progressed, Dreyer increasingly turned his back on what was considered good taste by Copenhagen's artistic establishment. Symptomatically, Lundbye and Skovgaard often attended Grundtvig's sermons while Dreyer preferred to read Blicher. It was not enough just to paint the Danish landscape in order to satisfy the aesthetics and ideology of the time. Good painting, it was believed, should not merely document the scenery at a specific locale. It was supposed to be a carefully composed representation of an idealized picture of the nation and the national character.

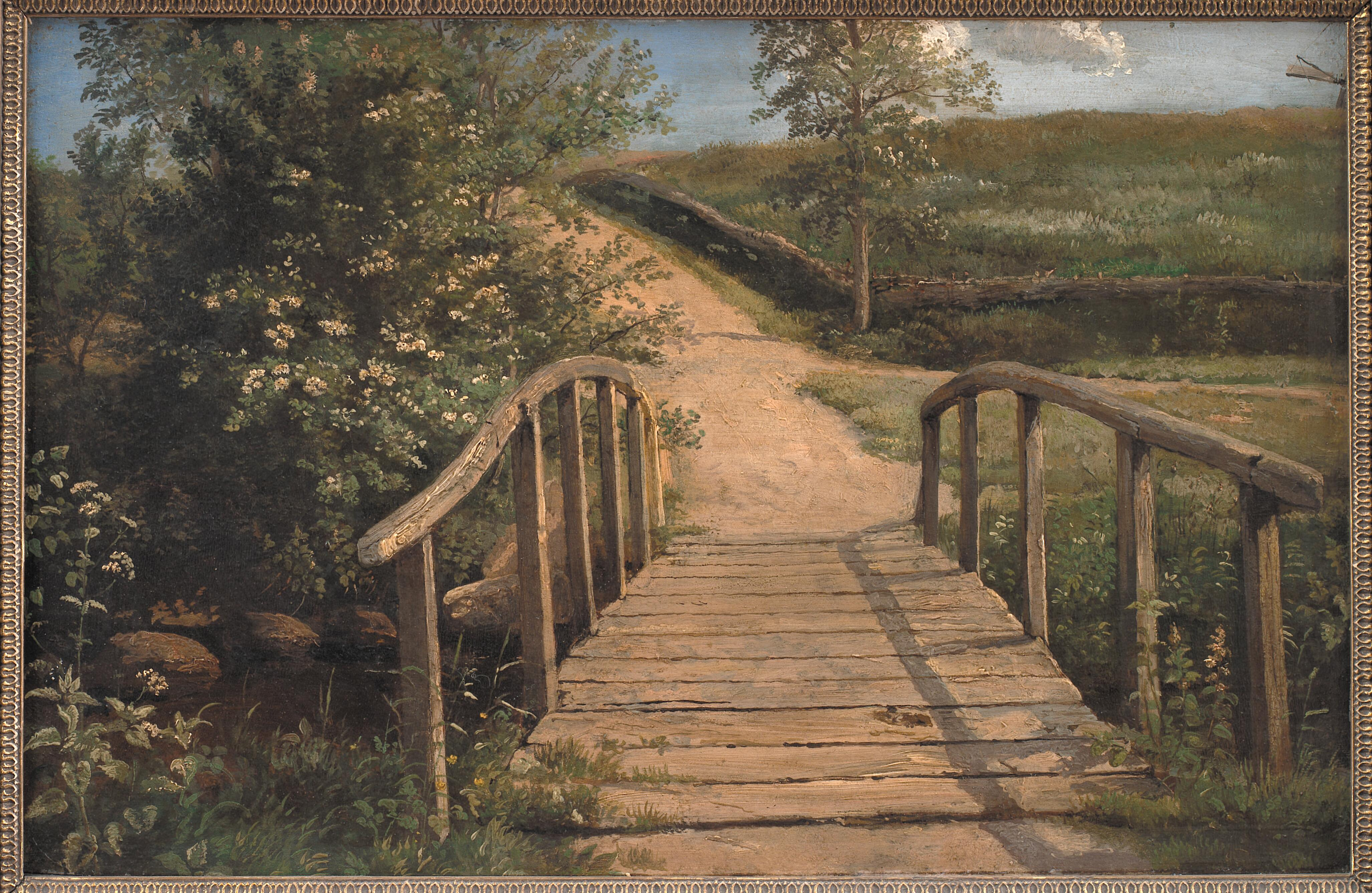
Bridge over a Stream in Assens, 1842.

The physicist Hans Christian Ørsted had launched the theory that people reflected the landscape they lived in. The Danish national character, he maintained, was calm and proud because the Danish landscape was so undramatic and the climate so mild. Dreyer could not, or would not, meet these demands. Painting the browning moorlands and not just the rolling, green hills of eastern Denmark, he was judged to be painting the wrong Denmark. He also presented a rougher, less sophisticated, image of the Danish countryside; one which was more dramatic and more natural. The critics reacted strongly against him. Dreyer, whose reserved and introvert nature had been observed by Jerichau during his childhood, stopped exhibiting at the annual Charlottenborg Spring Exhibition and increasingly withdrew from Copenhagen's art scene.

In 1848, he moved back to Funen, settling in the little village near Assens where he had grown up. He never stopped painting but he made no further efforts to exhibit. In 1852, when only 36, he died of typhus.

== Regained recognition ==
The art historian Karl Madsen reestablished Dreyer's reputation as one of the leading landscape artists of the day, on a par with Lundbye and Skovgaard, when commenting on two exhibitions in 1901 and 1912.

== See also ==
- Art of Denmark
- List of Danish painters

== Sources ==
- Suzanne Ludvigsen, Maleren Dankvart Dreyer. Forlaget Vandkunsten. ISBN 978-87-91393-93-8 (468 pages)
