= Listed buildings in Svendborg Municipality =

This is a list of listed buildings in Svendborg Municipality, Denmark.

Note: This list is incomplete. A complete list of listed buildings in Svendborg Municipality can be found on Danish Wikipedia.

== The list ==
=== 5700 Svendborg ===
Name	Image	Location	Coordinates	Description
Anne Hvides Gård		Fruestræde 3, 5700 Svendborg	55°3′36.68″N 10°36′32.62″E	Half timbered house from 1565–70 and side wing
Badstuen 2		Badstuen 2, 5700 Svendborg		
Badstuen 4		Badstuen 4, 5700 Svendborg		
Bagergade 1		Bagergade 1D, 5700 Svendborg	55°3′40.44″N 10°36′34.2″E	Half-timbered building from 1775
Bagergade 3		Bagergade 3A, 5700 Svendborg		
Bagergade 5		Bagergade 5A, 5700 Svendborg		
Bagergade 40		Bagergade 40E, 5700 Svendborg		
Bødkergården		Kullinggade 2A, 5700 Svendborg		
Bødkergården		Kullinggade 2A, 5700 Svendborg		
Baagøe House		Vestergade 2A, 5700 Svendborgg		
Baagøe House		Vestergade 2D, 5700 Svendborgg		
Christiansmøllen		Porthusvej 5A, 5700 Svendborg	55°4′2.66″N 10°36′47.6″E	Smock mill from 1859
Christoffer Mortensen House		Strædet 8, 5700 Svendborg		
Dronningsholmvej 72		Dronningholmsvej 72, 5700 Svendborg		
Ebenezer		Møllergade 35A, 5700 Svendborg	55°3′39.2″N 10°36′36.43″E	Half-timbered building on Møllergade from 1756 with brick extension on Fruestræde
Egense Rectory		Højensvej 163, 5700 Svendborg		
Egense Rectory		Højensvej 163, 5700 Svendborg		
Egense Rectory		Højensvej 163, 5700 Svendborg		
Egense Rectory		Højensvej 163, 5700 Svendborg		
Egense Skole		Højensvej 199, 5700 Svendborg		
Enkesædet		Skovballevej 21, 5700 Svendborg		
Enkesædet		Skovballevej 21, 5700 Svendborg		
Enkesædet		Skovballevej 21, 5700 Svendborg		
Enkesædet		Skovballevej 21, 5700 Svendborg		
Feldberederiet		Møllergade 86A, 5700 Svendborg		
Feldberederiet		Møllergade 86A, 5700 Svendborg		
Flyvervej 2		Flyvervej 2, 5700 Svendborg		
Flyvervej 2		Flyvervej 2, 5700 Svendborg		
Flyvervej 2		Flyvervej 2, 5700 Svendborg		
Gammel Hestehauge		Hallindskovvej 2, 5700 Svendborg	55°3′49.78″N 10°38′37.66″E	Gatehouse with extensions, originally built in 1791-97 but altered c. 1907
Grønnegade 7		Grønnegade 7, 5700 Svendborg		
Grønnegade 8		Grønnegade 8, 5700 Svendborg		
Grønnegade 10		Grønnegade 10, 5700 Svendborg		
Grønnegade 13		Grønnegade 13, 5700 Svendborg		
Grønnegade 13		Grønnegade 13, 5700 Svendborg		
Grønnegade 14		Grønnegade 14, 5700 Svendborg		
Grønnegade 14		Grønnegade 14, 5700 Svendborg		
Grønnegade 10		Grønnegade 10, 5700 Svendborg		
Grønnegade 17		Grønnegade 17, 5700 Svendborg		
Grønnegade 17		Grønnegade 17, 5700 Svendborg		
Grønnegade 18		Grønnegade 18, 5700 Svendborg		
Grønnegade 20		Grønnegade 20, 5700 Svendborg		
Grønnegade 21		Grønnegade 21, 5700 Svendborg		
Grønnegade 23		Grønnegade 23, 5700 Svendborg		
Grønnegade 24		Grønnegade 24, 5700 Svendborg		
Grønnegade 24		Grønnegade 24, 5700 Svendborg		
Havnemesterboligen		Havnepladsen 7, 5700 Svendborg		
Hvidkilde Castle		Fåborgvej 260, 5700 Svendborg	55°4′21.97″N 10°32′2.6″E	Main building dates from the 16th century; it was altered in 1742, probably by Philip de Lange
Klintegården		Drejø Skov 16, 5700 Svendborg		
Klintegården		Drejø Skov 16, 5700 Svendborg		
Klintegården		Drejø Skov 16, 5700 Svendborg		
Korsgade 14		Korsgade 14A, 5700 Svendborg		
Krøyers Pakhus		Krøyers Stræde 3, 5700 Svendborg		
Krøyers Pakhus		Møllergade 24A, 5700 Svendborg		
Kullinggade 6		Kullinggade 6A, 5700 Svendborg		
Kyseborgstræde 2		Kyseborgstræde 2, 5700 Svendborg		
Kyseborgstræde 4		Kyseborgstræde 4, 5700 Svendborg		
Kyseborgstræde 6		Kyseborgstræde 6, 5700 Svendborg		
Kyseborgstræde 20		Kyseborgstræde 20, 5700 Svendborg		
Lehnshøj		Fåborgvej 201, 5700 Svendborg		
Lægtmandsgården		Hestmaevej 1, 5700 Svendborg		
Lægtmandsgården		Hestmaevej 1, 5700 Svendborg		
Møllergade 43		Møllergade 43, 5700 Svendborg		
Ramsherred 2		Ramsherred 2, 5700 Svendborg	55°3′35.81″N 10°36′33.89″E	Corner building and garage wing from 1886 by Jens Eckersberg
Sankt Jørgens Hospital		Brydegårdsvej 15, 5700 Svendborg		
Sankt Jørgens Hospital		Brydegårdsvej 15, 5700 Svendborg		
Skattergade 8		Skattergade 8, 5700 Svendborg		
Skattergade 10		Skattergade 10A, 5700 Svendborg		
Skattergade 10		Skattergade 10A, 5700 Svendborg		
Sophie Frederikke Skolen		Sophie Frederikke V 1, 5700 Svendborg		
Strandgade 19		Strandgade 19, 5700 Svendborg		
Strandgade 19		Strandgade 19, 5700 Svendborg		
Strandgade 43		Strandgade 43, 5700 Svendborg		
Strandgade 43		Strandgade 43, 5700 Svendborg		
Strandgade 49		Strandgade 49, 5700 Svendborg		
Strandgade 53		Strandgade 53, 5700 Svendborg		
Troense gamle Skole		Grønnegade 2, 5700 Svendborg		
Troense gamle Skole		Strandgade 1, 5700 Svendborg		
Troense gamle Skole		Strandgade 1, 5700 Svendborg		
Troense Strandvej 2		Troense Strandvej 2, 5700 Svendborg		
Troense Strandvej 2		Troense Strandvej 2, 5700 Svendborg		
Troense Strandvej 42		Troense Strandvej 42, 5700 Svendborg		
Troense Strandvej 42		Troense Strandvej 42, 5700 Svendborg		
Troense Strandvej 44		Troense Strandvej 44, 5700 Svendborg		
Troense Strandvej 44		Troense Strandvej 44, 5700 Svendborg		
Tved Præstegård		Tved Kirkevej 1A, 5700 Svendborg		
Tved Præstegård		Tved Kirkevej 1A, 5700 Svendborg		
Tved Præstegård		Tved Kirkevej 1A, 5700 Svendborg		
Valdemars Castle		Nørreskovvej 39A, 5700 Svendborg		
Valdemars Castle		Nørreskovvej 41, 5700 Svendborg		
Valdemars Castle		Nørreskovvej 41, 5700 Svendborg		
Valdemars Castle		Nørreskovvej 41, 5700 Svendborg		
Valdemars Castle		Slotsalleen 100B, 5700 Svendborg		
Valdemars Castle		Slotsalleen 100D, 5700 Svendborg		
Valdemars Castle		Slotsalleen 100, 5700 Svendborg		
Valdemars Castle		Slotsalleen 100, 5700 Svendborg		
Valdemars Castle		Slotsalleen 100D, 5700 Svendborg		
Valdemars Castle		Slotsalleen 100D, 5700 Svendborg		
Valdemars Castle		Slotsalleen 100D, 5700 Svendborg		
Ventepose Vandmølle		Pilekrogen 26, 5700 Svendborg		
Ventepose Vandmølle		Pilekrogen 26, 5700 Svendborg		
Vestergade 45		Vestergade 45, 5700 Svendborg		
Viebæltegård		Grubbemøllevej 13, 5700 Svendborg		
Viebæltegård		Grubbemøllevej 13, 5700 Svendborg		
Viebæltegård		Grubbemøllevej 13, 5700 Svendborg		
Viebæltegård		Grubbemøllevej 13, 5700 Svendborg		
Vornæs Skole		Vornæsvej 39, 5700 Svendborg		
Vornæs Skole		Vornæsvej 39, 5700 Svendborg		
Vornæs Skole		Vornæsvej 39, 5700 Svendborg		

=== 5762 Vester Skerninge ===
Name	Image	Location	Coordinates	Description
Flintholm		Filippavej 57A, 5762 Vester Skerninge		
Flintholm		Filippavej 57A, 5762 Vester Skerninge		
Flintholm		Filippavej 57A, 5762 Vester Skerninge		
Højgård		Højgårdsvej 27, 5762 Vester Skerninge		
Højgård		Højgårdsvej 27, 5762 Vester Skerninge		
Krovej 11		Krovej 11, 5762 Vester Skerninge		
Krovej 13		Krovej 13, 5762 Vester Skerninge		
Krovej 15		Krovej 15, 5762 Vester Skerninge		
Nielstrup		Nielstrupvej 25, 5762 Vester Skerninge		
Rødkilde		Rødkildevej 15, 5762 Vester Skerninge		
Rødkilde		Rødkildevej 15, 5762 Vester Skerninge		
Rødkilde		Rødkildevej 15, 5762 Vester Skerninge		
Rødkilde		Rødkildevej 15, 5762 Vester Skerninge		
Rødkilde		Rødkildevej 15, 5762 Vester Skerninge		
Skerningegård		Skerningegårdsvej 12, 5762 Vester Skerninge		
Skerningegård		Skerningegårdsvej 12, 5762 Vester Skerninge		
Skerningegård		Skerningegårdsvej 12, 5762 Vester Skerninge		
Stensero		Svendborgvej 104, 5762 Vester Skerninge		
Vester Skerninge Kro		Krovej 4, 5762 Vester Skerninge		
Vester Skerninge Kro		Krovej 9, 5762 Vester Skerninge		
Vester Skerninge Kro		Krovej 9, 5762 Vester Skerninge		

=== 5771 Stenstrup ===
Name	Image	Location	Coordinates	Description
Kroghenlund		Hundstrupvej 29A, 5771 Stenstrup		
Kroghenlund		Hundstrupvej 29B, 5771 Stenstrup		
Kroghenlund		Hundstrupvej 29C, 5771 Stenstrup		
Skjoldemose		Rødmevej 45, 5771 Stenstrup		
Skjoldemose		Rødmevej 45, 5771 Stenstrup		
Stenstrup		Assensvej 233, 5771 Stenstrup		

=== 5881 Skårup Fyn ===
Listing name	Image	Location	Coordinates	Description
Brillegården		Skårupørevej 30, 5881 Skårup Fyn		
Brillegården		Skårupørevej 30, 5881 Skårup Fyn		
Brillegården		Skårupørevej 30, 5881 Skårup Fyn		
Rødegaard		Skårup Kirkebakke 3, 5881 Skårup Fyn		
Rødegaard		Skårup Kirkebakke 3, 5881 Skårup Fyn		
Rødegaard		Skårup Kirkebakke 3, 5881 Skårup Fyn		
Rødegaard		Skårup Kirkebakke 3, 5881 Skårup Fyn		
Skårup Hospital		Skårup Kirkebakke 1A, 5881 Skårup Fyn		
Skårup Seminarium		Skårup Kirkebakke 4, 5881 Skårup Fyn		

=== 5884 Gudme ===
Name	Image	Location	Coordinates	Description
Broholm		Broholmsvej 32, 5884 Gudme		
Broholm		Broholmsvej 32, 5884 Gudme		
Broholm		Broholmsvej 32, 5884 Gudme		
Broholm		Broholmsvej 32, 5884 Gudme		
Broholm		Broholmsvej 32, 5884 Gudme		
Broholm		Broholmsvej 32, 5884 Gudme		
Isebækgård		Boelsmosevej 29, 5883 Oure		
Isebækgård		Boelsmosevej 29, 5883 Oure		
Isebækgård		Boelsmosevej 29, 5883 Oure		

=== 5874 Hesselager ===
Name	Image	Location	Coordinates	Description
Hesselager Møllegård		Møllevej 21, 5874 Hesselager		
Hesselager, Store og Lille Hospital (tidl. kirkelade)		Vandværksvej 5, 5874 Hesselager		
Hesselager, Store og Lille Hospital (tidl. kirkelade)		Vandværksvej 5, 5874 Hesselager		
Hesselager, Store og Lille Hospital (tidl. kirkelade)		Vandværksvej 5, 5874 Hesselager		
Hesselagergård		Hesselagergårdsvej 20A, 5874 Hesselager	55°9′30.32″N 10°45′49.76″E	Renaissance-style manor house from 1538, probably designed by Martin Bussert and with the gables altered in c. 1550
Lundeborg Pakhus		Havnevej 3, 5874 Hesselager		

=== 5882 Vejstrup ===
Name	Image	Location	Coordinates	Description
Vejstrup Mølle		Vejstrup Vandmølle 1, 5882 Vejstrup		
Vejstrupgård		Vejstrupgårds Alle 1, 5882 Vejstrup		

== Delisted buildings ==
Name	Image	Location	Coordinates	Description
Badstuen 1. Former inn		Badstuen 1, 5700 Svendborg		
Gerritsgade 31 E		Kyseborgstræde 20, 5700 Svendborg		
Grønnegade 12		Grønnegade 12, 5700 Svendborg		
Grønnegade 22		Grønnegade 22, 5700 Svendborg		
Møllergade 34 A		Møllergade 34A, 5700 Svendborg		
Strandgade 37		Strandgade 37, 5700 Svendborg		
Strandgade 47		Strandgade 47, 5700 Svendborg		
Strandgade 64		Strandgade 64, 5700 Svendborg		
Striglerhuset		Strandgade 33, 5700 Svendborg		
Troense Strandvej 48		Troense Strandvej 48, 5700 Svendborg		
Troense Strandvej 48		Troense Strandvej 48, 5700 Svendborg		
Vester Skærninge Præstegård		Fåborgvej 20, 5762 Vester Skerninge		
Vester Skærninge Præstegård		Fåborgvej 20, 5762 Vester Skerninge		
Østre Havnevej 16		Østre Havnevej 16A, 5700 Svendborg		
