= Walter W. Stone =

Australian publisher

Walter William Stone OAM (24 June 1910 – 29 August 1981), known as Wal Stone, was a noted Australian book publisher, book collector and passionate supporter of Australian literature.

== Early life ==
Walter was born in Orange, New South Wales. He spent the first 14 years of his life in Orange, before moving to Auburn, a western Sydney suburb, where his father wound down his career as a bookmaker. After completing his education at the Parramatta Boys High School, he was articled to a solicitor, but after the solicitor's death he held a number of depression-era jobs such as rent collector and door-to-door salesman. Partial deafness kept him out of the military during the Second World War. He worked as a clerk for General Electric and continued that occupation with another company after the war until 1956.

== Book publishing ==
Acting on his interest in book production, he bought an Adana press in 1951. During the next decade, as Talkarra Press (an Aboriginal word for "stone"), he produced ten innovative limited editions, including Dulcie Deamer's poem "Blue Centaur" (1953), P. R. Stephensen's "Kookaburra's and Satyrs" (1954) and R. D. FitzGerald's poem of a convict-flogging, "The Wind at Your Door" (1959). In 1956, he re-established the bankrupt Wentworth Press. From successive premises in Sydney, Surry Hills and Marrickville — and trading as Wentworth Books — he published about 120 books, mostly Australian history, literature and poetry. Two influential books have been: "Dawn in the Valley: The Early History of the Hunter Valley Settlement", by W. Allan Wood (1972); and "Early Sydney Cabinetmakers, 1804 - 1870", by John Earnshaw (1971).

== Book Collectors Society of Australia ==
Walter Stone, a bibliophile from an early age, was a founding member of the Book Collectors Society of Australia (BCSA) in 1944, and was its major supporter for all his life. He edited and printed the journal of the society, Biblionews, from 1947 until his death in 1981, whence he was succeeded by John Edward Fletcher. He also printed and was general editor of the BCSA series "Studies in Australian Bibliography" (1954-1978), which recorded the publications of such writers as Henry Lawson, Joseph Furphy, John Shaw Neilson, Rolf Boldrewood, Christopher Brennan, Hugh McCrae, Marcus Clarke and several members of the Norman Lindsay family.

== Other community organisations ==
Walter was an influential member (sometimes co-founder) of many organisations, including the Fellowship of Australian Writers (FAW), Australian Society of Authors, the National Book Council, the Christopher Brennan Society and the North Shore Historical Society. He actively campaigned with Colin Roderick and others for a Chair in Australian literature at the University of Sydney. A member of the Sydney Branch of the English Association, Stone edited the journal Southerly for one year in 1961, and printed the magazine at his Wentworth Press from 1962 for some years. He was also friend to many libraries, including the University of Sydney, La Trobe, the State Library of Victoria, and the Fryer Library at the University of Queensland. For the last, he was instrumental in acquiring the important Father Leo Hayes Collection of Australian Literature.

== Political life ==
Walter Stone had a lifelong involvement with left-wing Australian Labor Party (ALP) politics, but nevertheless considered himself an Australian nationalist. He first assisted the controversial Jack Lang (premier of New South Wales) in his Auburn electorate. Later he was active in the Neutral Bay branch. He was chair of the meeting at Mosman Town Hall on 21 June 1966, addressed by ALP Opposition Leader Arthur Calwell, who was shot and wounded by Peter Kocan after leaving the meeting. The ALP awarded him life membership after 50 years of active service.

== Personal life ==
Walter married Mollie Jenkins in 1932 and had five children, before she died at age 29. His sons later worked as printers at Wentworth Press. He later married Jean Saxelby in 1951, and they lived in her home at Cremorne. Jean became an integral part of all his publishing and literary pursuits, and after his death, published his biography. Suffering from a long illness, he died in 1981. His extensive book collection was sold by catalogue by bookseller Antique Bookshop and Curios in 1982. His personal papers, and those of Wentworth Press, are held by Fisher Library Rare Books, the State Library of New South Wales and the National Library of Australia. He was interviewed in 1962 by Hazel de Berg about his life and career. The recording can be found at the National Library of Australia.

== Recognition ==
Walter Stone was awarded an Order of Australia Medal (OAM) in June 1981 for his support of Australian literature, but was unable to attend in person because of his terminal illness. He received the National Book Council (NBC) Bookman of the Year Award in 1975. The BCSA holds the occasional Walter and Jean Stone Memorial Lecture. The Fellowship of Australian Writers (NSW) makes the biennial Walter Stone Award for Life Writing (for Australian historical biographies).

== See also ==
- Arthur Calwell
- Australian Society of Authors
- Book collecting
- Book Collectors Society of Australia
- Fellowship of Australian Writers
- Jack Lang (Australian politician)
- John Edward Fletcher
- Norman Hetherington
- Peter Kocan
- Southerly (journal)
