= Marlene Norst =

Australian academic

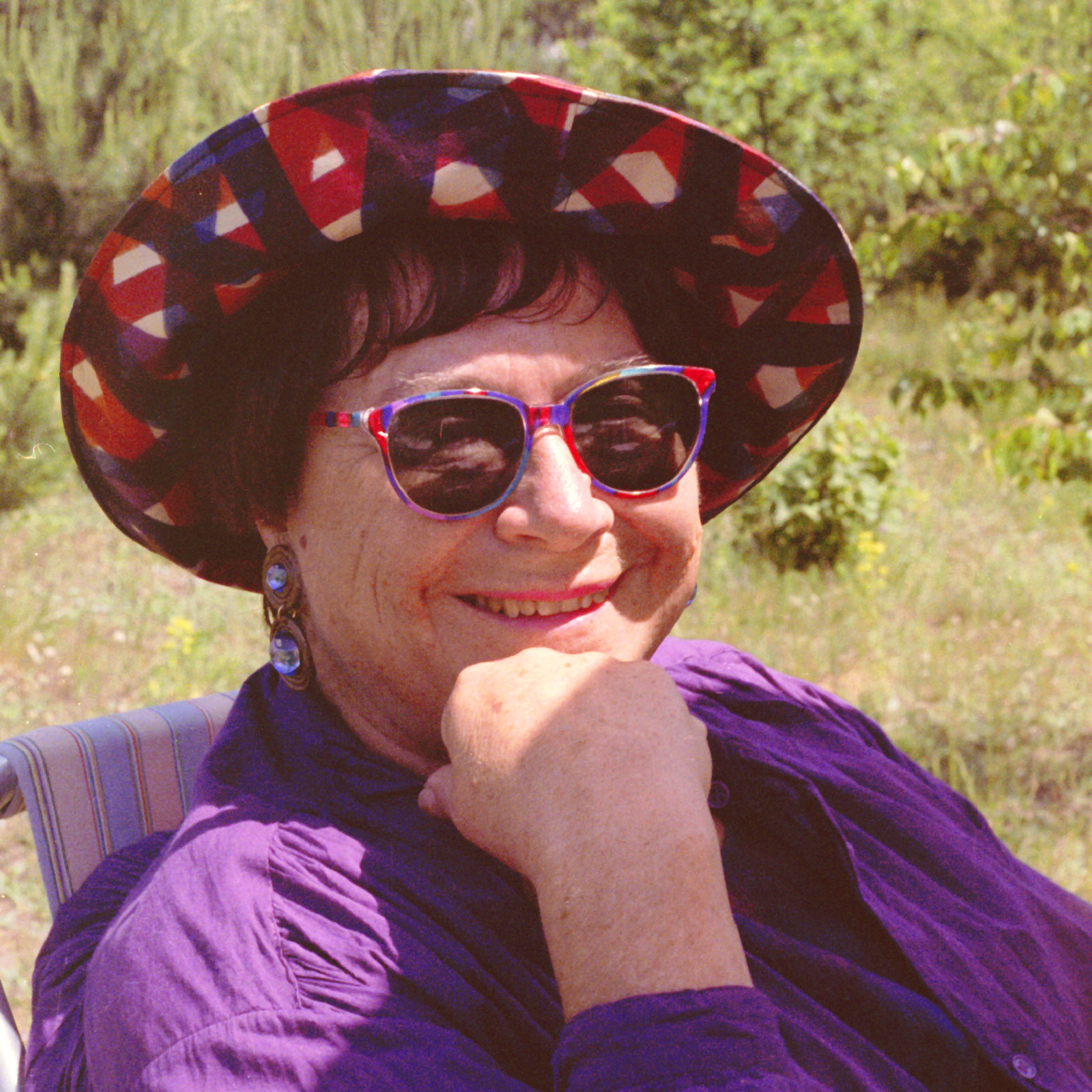
Marlene J. Norst 1995

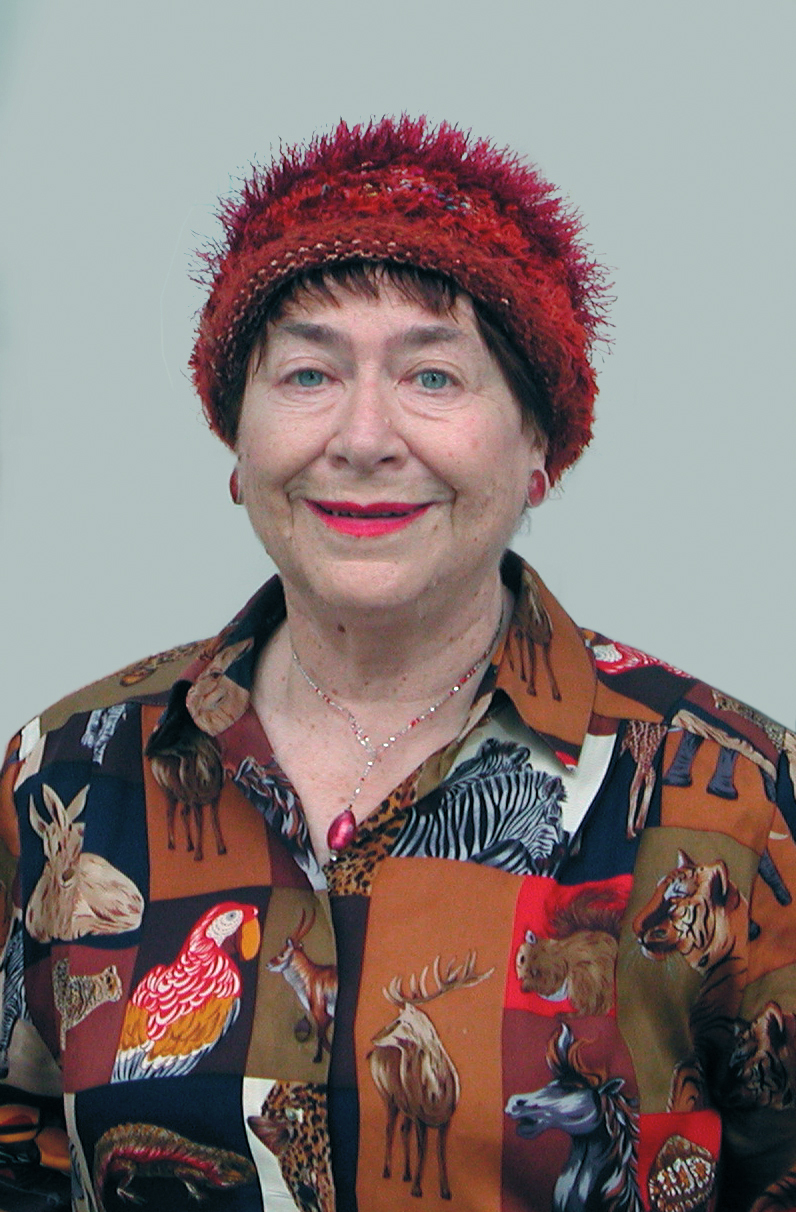
Marlene J. Norst 2002

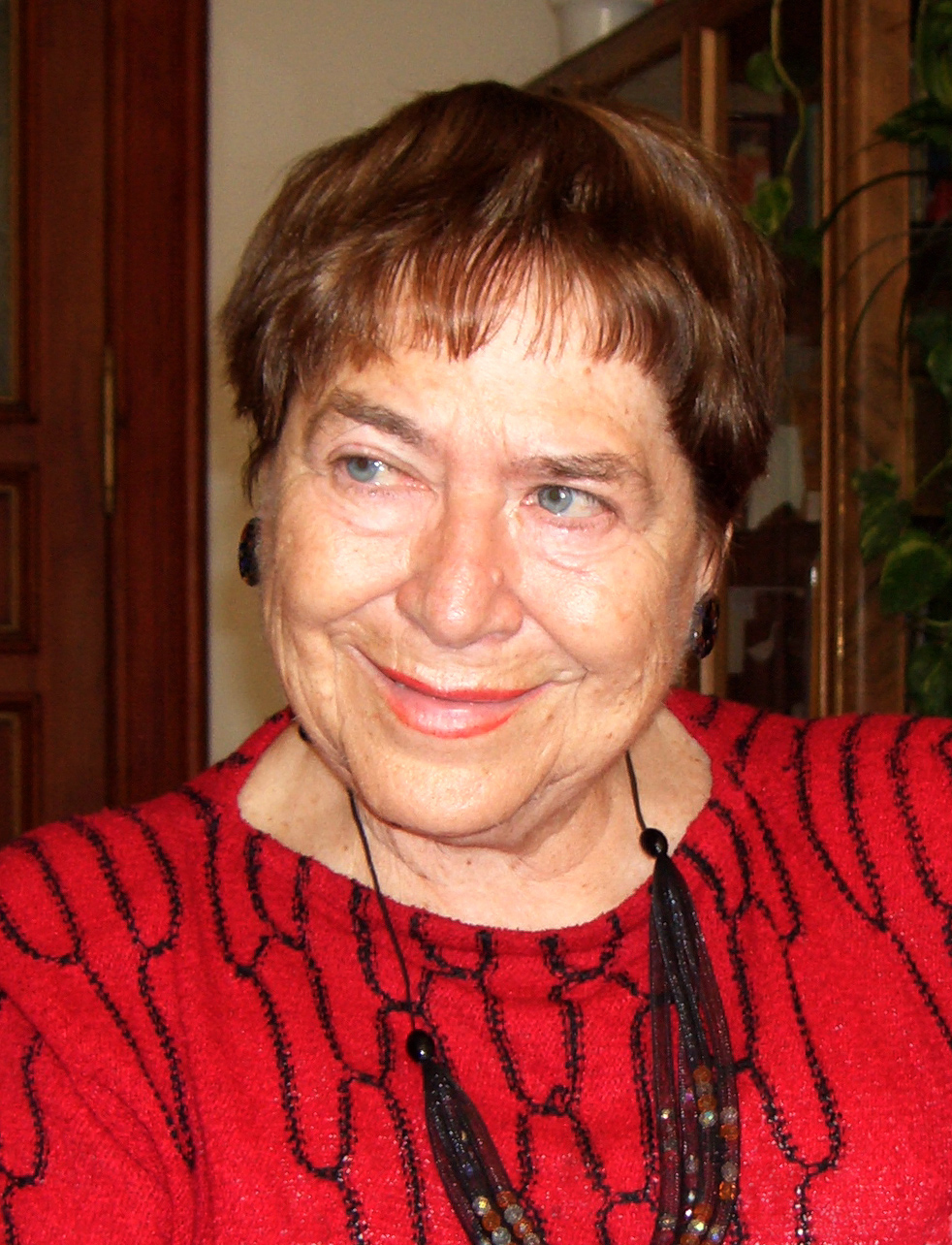
Marlene J. Norst 2005

Marlene Johanna Norst (24 March 1930 – 20 December 2010) was an Australian linguist, pedagogue and philanthropist of Austrian heritage. Her main areas of work were German language and literature studies, language pedagogy, English as a second language, socio-linguistics and children’s literature.

== Early life ==
Norst was born in Vienna, to the lawyer Dr. Anton Heinrich Norst (1900–1974) and the English language scholar Dr. Mary Norst, née Widrich (1900–1967), and grandchild of the author and journalist Dr. Anton Norst (1859–1939), who was a brother of Eugenie Schwarzwald.

Following the Anschluss (the annexation of Austria by Germany) in March 1938 the Norst family fled Austria because of the threat of persecution by the Nazi regime. After a short stay from 22 May to 22 June 1938 with Anton’s sister, Else Rubinowicz (1892–1969), wife of the physicist Wojciech Rubinowicz, in Lwów/Poland the Norsts moved on to Denmark, where they stayed for a few months on the island of Thurø with the author Karin Michaëlis, a friend of Eugenie Schwarzwald. There they met Bertolt Brecht and his second wife, Helene Weigel. After that they traveled on to Canada and finally settled in Australia. Norst’s father was employed in a cannery in Leeton as the food technologist and tasked with establishing a laboratory.

In Leeton, Norst went to a Catholic primary school and then became a boarder at Mt. Erin Presentation Convent in Wagga Wagga.

After secondary school she studied German and Linguistics at Sydney University and later at Newcastle University.

== Teaching career ==
After teaching 1952–1956 at Naremburn Boys' School, Riverside Girls' School (both in Sydney) and at Kempsey High School, a co-educational country school, she left for London where she taught for two years at Walworth Comprehensive School. During this period in Europe she spent about three months in Vienna and gained her "Universitätssprachprüfung" (university language exam) at Vienna University. One of her students in Kempsey (New South Wales) was Harry Penrith, later known as Burnum Burnum.

From 1957 to 1967 Norst taught at the German department of the University of Newcastle, New South Wales. She received her PhD from Newcastle University on 17 March 1972. The title of her PhD thesis was: Julius Duboc and Robert Waldmüller. An Enquiry into some Aspects of the Literary Biographical Genre.

In 1964 she was the recipient of a German government grant and studied German Biedermeier literature at the University of Heidelberg.

From 1968 to 1986 Norst lectured in German, Linguistics and Children’s literature at Macquarie University, in the Department of Modern Languages, serving as associate professor in German for 10 years.

In 1974 she worked for a year in the Linguistics Department at the University of Edinburgh, doing research on the perception of intonation patterns by native and non-native speakers, using synthesised and natural speech.

In 1978 she was attached to the Linguistics Department of Vienna University and worked on language planning in multi-lingual societies. Main areas of work: German language and literature studies, linguistics, language pedagogy, English as a second language, socio-linguistics, children’s literature.

Norst participated in numerous linguistic conferences (e.g. 1982 in Mexico and the Netherlands) and gave lectures at universities in London, Vienna, Hamburg and Oldenburg.

In 1986 Norst received a grant from the Austrian government to study the migration patterns of Austrian remigrants from Australia (migrants who had decided to return to Austria). This work as well as extensive research in Australia, including many interviews with Austrian migrants in Australia and Austria formed the basis of the book Austrians and Australia (with Johanna McBride) which was published in 1988.

== Freelance work ==
In 1986, she resigned from Macquarie University and established herself as a freelance writer, multicultural consultant and teacher.

In the Vienna Natural History Museum she discovered the drawings of the Austrian botanic artist Ferdinand Lucas Bauer (1760–1826), who had documented Australian flora and fauna when he was engaged to accompany Matthew Flinders on the first circumnavigation of the Australian continent. At the invitation of the British Museum which holds his corresponding colour drawings, she wrote a book about Ferdinand Lucas Bauer in which she brought together the pencil and colour drawings.

In 1989 Norst embarked on an oral history project entitled Family Reflections, where she supported families in documenting and writing their stories and history. She was a close friend of the Aboriginal activist, Burnum Burnum (1936–1997) and on his request wrote his biography Burnum Burnum: A Warrior for Peace.

She taught English language and literacy to international students, migrants as well as street kids and ex-prisoners at institutions including Sydney Skill Share, Wesley Skill Share and Street Smart, as well as Sydney TAFE and Nature Care.

In 1991 she was awarded the University of Newcastle Convocation Medal for "Outstanding Professional Merit", and 1995 the "Ehrenkreuz für Literatur und Wissenschaft der Republik Österreich" (The Cross of Honour for Literature and Science of the Republic of Austria)

Norst translated a number of German plays into English - including works by Igor Bauersima, Falk Richter, Lukas Bärfuss, Roland Schimmelpfennig, Reto Finger, Margareth Obexer, Agnes Gerstenberg. Many of these translations have had public performances. The play Before/After (Vorher / Nachher) was performed by Sydney Theatre Company in February 2011, less than two months after her death in Sydney.

== Personal life ==
As an enthusiastic chorister, Norst was a member of Sydney Philharmonia Choir and of SUMS (the Sydney University Musical Society) for many years and took part in many performances and concert tours in Australia and overseas.

== Bibliography ==
=== Books ===
- Marlene Norst and John Fletcher, German Language Books in the Libraries of Canberra, Melbourne and New South Wales, North Ryde, N.S.W., Macquarie University, School of Modern Languages, German Section, 1972.
- German literature in the libraries of the A. C. T. and New South Wales, edited by John Fletcher and Marlene Norst
- Marlene Johanna Norst and Johanna McBride, Austrians and Australia, Athena Press, Potts Point 1988 ISBN 0-7316-4361-5
- Marlene Johanna Norst, Ferdinand Bauer: the Australian Natural History Drawings, British Museum of Natural History/Lothian, London/Melbourne, 1989, ISBN 0-565-01048-4.
- Marlene Johanna Norst, Burnum Burnum: A Warrior for Peace, Simon and Schuster / Kangaroo Press, 1999 ISBN 0-86417-978-2

=== Publications (selection) ===
- Stifter's 'Nachsommer' and Biedermeier in: German Literature, ed. J.M. Ritchie, vol.2; Wolff, London, 1969, pp. 147–64.
- How Does Your Lexicon Grow? in: Language Learning in Australian Society eds. D. Ingram and T. Quinn, Australian International Press, Melbourne, 1978, pp. 166–72.
- Bücher für das bilinguale Immigrantenkind in Australien in: Schriftenreihe des Börsenvereins des deutschen Buchhandels 13, Frankfurt, 1978, pp. 166–72.
- Origins: Story Traditions in the Multicultural Society in: Through Folklore to Literature ed. M. Saxby, IBBY Australia Publications, Sydney, 1979, pp. 203–12.
- Australian National Survey of Ethnic Schools, Macquarie University, Sydney, 1982, (commissioned by the Commonwealth Schools Commission)
  - Vol.1 Report with Recommendations, pp. 1–218
  - Vol.2 Data Digest, pp. 1–159
  - Vol.3 Annotated Bibliography, pp. 1–52
  - Vol.4 Register of Organisations, pp. 1–65
- Humour: A Marker of National Identity? in: "The Austrian Problem Working Papers", Monash University, Melbourne, 1982, pp. 141–55.
- Kinder- und Jugendliteratur in; A Glossary of German Literary Terms, eds. E.W. Herd and A. Obermayer, University of Otago, Dunedin, 1983.
- Language Needs Research in Australia in: Research into Foreign Language Needs eds. Theo van Els and Maria Oud-de Glas, Augsburger 1&1 Schriften, Bd.29, Universität Augsburg, 1983, pp. 139–50.
- The Significance of Language in a Multicultural Society in: Proceedings of the First National Congress of the Federation of Ethnic Communities Councils of Australia, Melbourne, 1985, pp. 57–58.
- Kooperative Spracherziehung als Gemeinschaftsaufgabe in Australien: Auf dem Weg von der monolingualen zur multilingualen Gesellschaft in: Einwanderungsland Australien: Materialien aus der australischen Migrationsforschung ed. W. Weber, Athenaum Verlag, Frankfurt am Main, 1987, pp. 184–201.
- Bert Brecht Welcomes Karin Michaelis into Exile: Towards a Literary Vade-Mecum for Political Refugees in: Antipodische Aufklärung, Antipodean Enlightenments: Festschrift für Leslie Bodi, Walter Veit, Peter Lang Frankfurt a, M., 1987, pp~317-21.
- Language Prejudice and Fear: affective barriers to language learning by adults. (with Yair Cohen). 8th World Congress of Applied Linguistics (AWA) University of Sydney, 1987, Programme p. 50
- Through Australian Eyes: Kinderbücher aus Australien, translation of the catalogue of the Australian Children's Book Exhibition at the International Youth Library, Munich, ed. R. Bunbury, Deakin University, Victoria, 1988, pp. 1–94.
- Entry on Ethel Pedley in Australian Dictionary of Biography vol.11, 1988.
- Strauss to Matilda: Viennese in Australia 1938-88, ed. K. Bittman, Wenkart Foundation, Sydney, 1988, Introduction, pp.xiii~vii, Not by Bread Alone: The Story of Bettina McDuff pp. 87–98, A Country Child's Perspective pp. 247–52.
- The Austrians: Experienced Multiculturalists in: History, The Royal Australian Historical Society, Sydney, 3/1989, pp. 11–14.
- Fear, Dependence and Loss of Self-Esteem: Affective Barriers in Second Language Learning among Adults (with Y. Cohen), in: Relc, Seamo Regional Language Centre, Singapore, vol. 2/2, 1989.
- Editor of Ethnic Schools Bulletin vol.5, no.1, NSW Federation of Ethnic Schools, Sydney, July/August 1991.
- Editor of No Fixed Address, magazine of the Street Kids of Wesley StreetSmart Youth Centre, Wesley Mission 1.Edition, March 1992.
- Editor of Mirage, Magazine of the Street Kids of Oasis Refuge (The Salvation Army), September 1993.
- Language Ego, Language Fear and Regression in Adult Language Learning (with Y Cohen) in Psycholinguistics for Applied Linguistics compiled by I.A. Stevenson, Dept. of Linguistics, Unisa, University of South Africa, Pretoria, 1993.
- Editor of No Fixed Address, magazine of the Street Kids of StreetSmart Youth Centre, Wesley Mission, 2. Edition. 1995
- Editor of Gnome Tome for Street Kids of StreetSmart Youth Centre, Wesley Mission, 1997.
- Let's Meet at StreetSmart, Interviews with Street Kids from StreetSmart Youth Centre, Wesley Mission recorded on video, October–November 1998.
- Translation into English of Norway. Today by Igor Bauersima, S.Fischer, Frankfurt/a.M, 2000 for the Goethe Institute, Sydney, 2001.
- Translation into English of Nothing Hurts by Falk Richter, Fischer Verlag, Berlin.
- Translation into English of Seven Seconds (In God We Trust) by Falk Richter, S. Fischer, Frankfurt/a.M, 2002 for the Goethe Institute, Sydney, 2003
- Translation into English of Electronic City by Falk Richter, S.Fischer, Frankfurt am Main, 2004 for the Goethe Institute, Sydney, 2004.
- Translation into English of Vorher/Nachher by Roland Schimmelpfennig, S.Fischer, Frankfurt/a.M, 2001 for Goethe Institute, Sydney, 2004.
- Translation into English of Seven Seconds (In God We Trust) by Falk Richter in: Theatre 35.1, Harvard University, March 2005.
- Translation into English of Schwerelos oder Rücksicht auf Verluste (Weightless or With Regard to Any Losses Incurred) by Agnes Gerstenberg, 22.4.2005 published: http://www.worldinterplay.org/file_banks/scripts/script319.pdf - May 2005.
- Translation into English of Der Bus (The Makings of a Saint) by Lukas Baerfuss, Hartmann und Stauffacher, Verlag für Bühne, Film, Funk und Fernsehen, 30.9.2005.
- Translation into English of Fernwärme (Remote Warmth) by Reto Finger, Fischer Verlag, 2006. ... June 2006.
- Translation into English of Geisterschiff (Ghost Ship) by Margareth Obexer, Hartmann und Stauffacher Verlag, Cologne 2009.
- Translation into English of Lotzer. Eine Revolution (Lotzer. A Revolution) by Margareth Obexer, Hartmann und Stauffacher Verlag, Cologne 2009

== Sources ==
- CV of 26 September 2010 (Original!)
- Bibliography of 28 August 2010 (Original!)
- Marlene Norst, A country child's perspective, in: Karl Bittmann, Strauss to Matilda. Viennese in Australia. 1938–1988, Wenkart Foundation, 1988.
- Macquarie University - Dr. Marlene Norst shows drawings of Ferdinand Bauer
