= Borkum Riff =

Brand of pipe tobacco

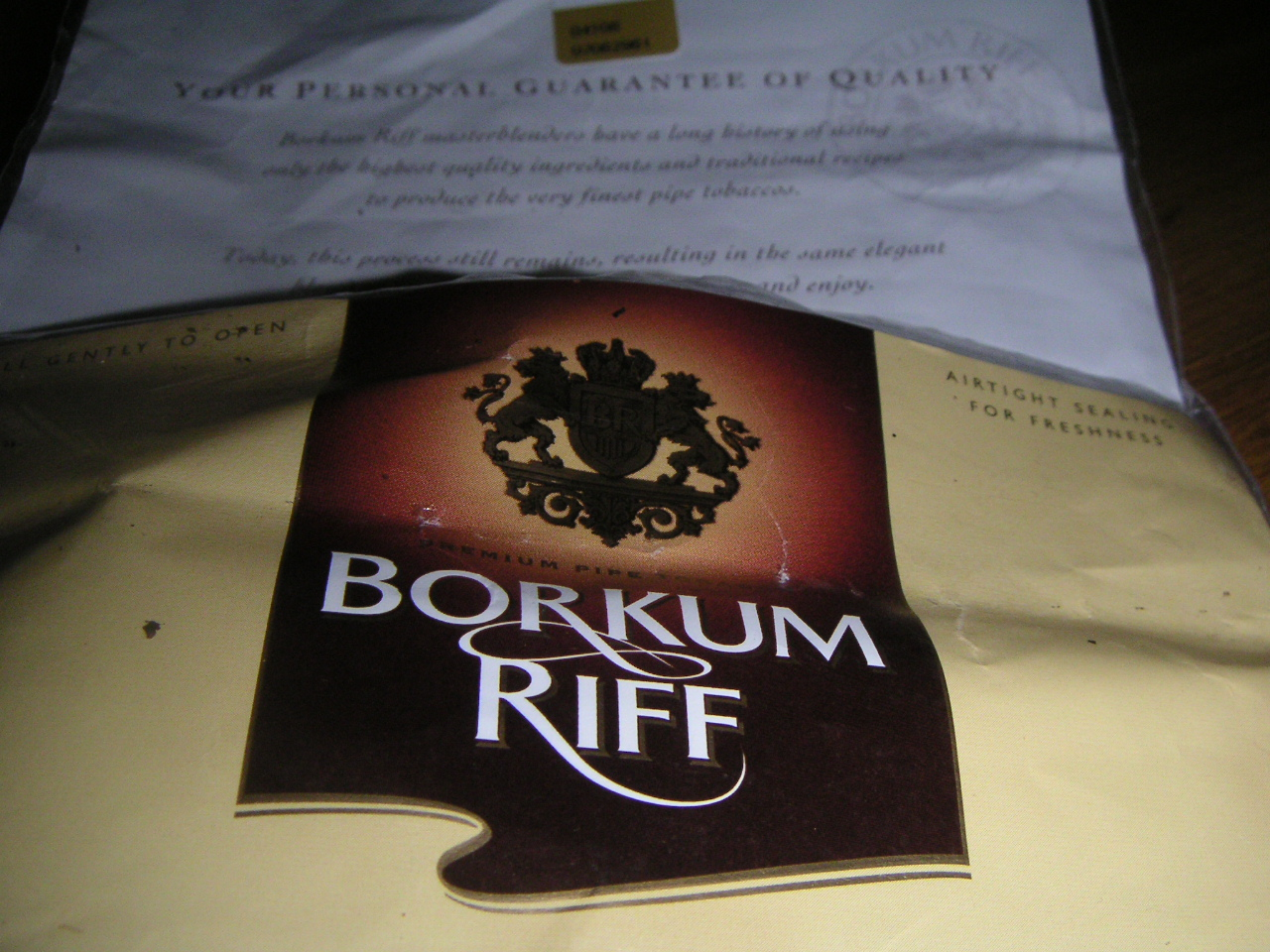
A packet of Borkum Riff Vanilla pipe tobacco

Borkum Riff is a brand of pipe tobacco manufactured in Denmark for the Scandinavian Tobacco Group.

== History ==
'Borkum Riff' tobacco was launched in Sweden in 1962, named after a lighthouse of the same name, located at 53° 58' N, and 6° 22' E in Heligoland Bight off the Dutch coast in the North Sea. It was a landmark for seafarers and was well-known to Swedish radio listeners, as weather reports mentioned Borkum Riff several times a day. The former lightship was used from 1960 to 1964 as the first radio ship of Radio Veronica, which became the first offshore radio station in the Netherlands.

The tobacco was a rough-cut blend of Virginia and Burley and had been developed by Bertil Sandegård with an eye on the US pipe tobacco market. Initial sales were slow-moving, but when Borkum Riff's Bourbon Whiskey blend was successfully introduced in the US in 1969, sales increased. Since then, new flavours and new packaging have been introduced. Today, Borkum Riff is also sold in India, Canada, Australia, Switzerland, Norway, Spain, New Zealand, Japan, France, Italy, and Germany as well as in several other markets around the world. Borkum Riff's biggest market, however, is still the United States.

Today, the Borkum Riff, which is manufactured in Denmark for Swedish Match, is the third-largest tobacco producer on the Swedish market. In 2011, Borkum Riff's ownership changed to Scandinavian Tobacco Group. The ship in the Borkum Riff's company logo originates from a 17th-century engraving made by Johann Baptist Homann.

== Manufacturing ==
The tobacco is manufactured on behalf of Swedish Match at the Scandinavian Tobacco Group's Orlik factory in Assens, Denmark. Formerly, it had been produced by Mac Baren on a dedicated production line.
