= Svendborg Friary =

Svendborg Friary was a Franciscan friary in Svendborg, on the island of Funen, in the present Region of Southern Denmark, and was one of the earliest Franciscan foundations in Denmark. Like almost all Danish religious houses it was dissolved during the Protestant Reformation of the 16th century.

== History ==
The first Franciscan establishment in Svendborg was the chapel built in 1236. This building was destroyed when the town of Svendborg was burned to the ground by King Abel of Denmark in 1247 after a short siege. Another friary was built in about 1288 as the result of a gift of land for a chapel for the Franciscans from Herr Astrad Frakke, Herr Niels Bille (the brother of Bishop Johannes Bille), Herr Niels Beger and several other local nobles. Count Gert of Holstein and his son also made gifts of properties to support the Franciscan friars in Svendborg. In 1268 Lady Gro Gunnarsdatter Vint, the extremely wealthy widow of Esbjørn Vognsen, gave away her considerable fortune to abbeys, priories and friaries throughout Denmark when she joined the Poor Clares in Roskilde. The "brothers' [friars'] chapel at Svendborg" is specifically mentioned in the list of her beneficiaries.

The Gothic church was completed in 1361 and was dedicated to Saint Catherine. Svendborg was burned by the Hanseatic Fleet in 1389, after which the friary was rebuilt yet again. During the 15th century it expanded considerably, and the buildings were extended several times.

The main friary precinct of this period consisted of a rectangular enclosure containing a church, dormitory, refectory, and servants' quarters, as well as a cloister surrounding a central garden. The buildings were constructed from red brick, the most common building material at the time.

The friary had a close connection with St. George's Chapel and Hospital just outside Svendborg, the last remaining medieval leper hospital in Denmark.

One of the most controversial times for the friary was in 1500 when Queen Christina, who was at that point in direct control of Svendborg, gave the whole of Bysen Street (Bysenstræde) to the Franciscans to use as accommodation for the town's poor and sick in their care. The mayor and the town council strongly disapproved of this action, which caused a severe rift between the town and the friary.

== Dissolution ==
During the short civil war known as the Count's Feud (Danish:Grevens Fejde), Svenborg made the mistake of siding with Count Christoffer, acting for Christian II of Denmark. When Christian III's troops took Svenborg and the rest of Fynen in 1534, they pillaged the town and its churches. With the Lutherans now firmly in control of the town and country, the priory was permanently closed, though by the end of 1530 it had been abandoned by the Franciscans. The last guardian of the priory, Hans Gaas, quickly accepted the Lutheran Ordinances and became the first Lutheran pastor of Our Lady's Church (Danish:Vor Frue Kirke) in Svendborg. The priory was taken over by the town. The friars went to other Franciscan houses outside Denmark or returned to secular life.

The friary church became a parish church for the people of Svendborg. The east wing was demolished shortly after the Reformation. The west wing of the priory was converted into a Latin school which operated until 1740. The buildings where the Latin School had been located were torn down in 1875. In 1586 the north wing of the friary was turned into a hospital founded by Lady Helvig Hardenberg. The old hospital was torn down in 1870.

== After dissolution ==
By 1828 the former friary church had fallen into serious disrepair and the town council decided to demolish it. The buildings were blown up, the ground levelled and the site in the town centre redeveloped with houses and shops: some buildings used parts of the old friary walls as foundations. The churchyard containing thousands of common and noble graves was cleared and the most recently buried bodies transferred to a cemetery a few streets away. The altarpiece however was preserved and is now located in Thurø Church.

Recent excavations by Svendborg Museum have revealed that the later friary complex was much larger than was previously thought, and contained many structures in addition to the old rectangular layout.

== Sources ==
- Svendborg Klosterkirke (in Danish)
