= Elisabeth Meyer =

Elisabeth Meyer may refer to:

- Elisabeth Meyer (photographer) (1899–1968), Norwegian photographer
- Elisabeth Meyer (composer) (1859–1927), Danish composer
