= Tom Kristensen (poet) =

Danish poet, novelist, literary critic and journalist

- Born: 4 August 1893; London, England, United Kingdom
- Died: 2 June 1974 (aged 80); Thurø, near Svendborg, Denmark
- Occupations: Poet, journalist, novelist and literary critic
- Writing career
- Period: 1920–1954
- Genres: Travelling and poetry

Tom Kristensen (4 August 1893 – 2 June 1974), was a Danish poet, novelist, literary critic and journalist.

== Life and work ==
Kristensen was born in London to Danish parents, but grew up in Copenhagen and was educated at the University of Copenhagen.

Kristensen is considered one of the most colourful poets of his generation. His two collections of poems Fribytterdrømme (1920, "Freebooter Dreams") and Mirakler (1922, "Miracles") are classics of Danish expressionism, marked by revolutionary artistic enthusiasm and restlessness. Påfuglefjeren (1922, "The Peacock Feather") which is inspired by a journey to China, is deeper and more sombre, especially the poem Henrettelsen ("The Execution") that is depicting a man's intense powers of observation just before he is beheaded, which can be considered a modernist manifesto. The contemporary novel Livets Arabesk (1921 – "The Arabesque of Life") is a revolutionary futuristic fantasy in expressionist form. He started his career as a literary reviewer and critic in Tilskueren in May 1923.

In 1930 he published perhaps his most well-known work, the novel Hærværk (literally: Vandalism, published in English as Havoc in 1968). Hærværk is the story of Danish journalist Ole Jastrau who is driven to self-destruction by drinking himself to death. Apart from its presumed autobiographical character, it probably reflects the intellectual, political and personal crises of many writers and artists between the World Wars. A poem from this novel, Angst ("Fear"), with its fascination with disaster, has become a classic. The book is also considered one of the best literary Danish-language depictions of alcoholism.

During the 1930s, Kristensen concentrated on commemorative poems, of which he was a master – many are found in Mod den yderste Rand (1936, "Against the furthest Edge") and Digte i Døgnet (1940, "Poems a Day"). A final collection of poems Den sidste Lygte (1954, "The last Lamp") parades the themes of his writings.

Besides being a writer of fiction, Kristensen was a sharp and outstanding critic, and for thirty years he worked as a reviewer, mostly at the radical-liberal daily Politiken. As a critic he was lauded for his ability to enter into the spirit of his subject. He also wrote many collections of essays and travel books − most famously En Kavaler i Spanien (1927, "A Gentleman in Spain").

=== A Gentleman in Spain ===
En kavaler i Spanien (A Gentleman in Spain) is a travel account of one of Kristensen's journeys. It is written in an expressionistic style and is thus a very subjective account. The book follows Tom Kristensen on his journey through Spain in the 1920s. He writes about the various sights, and about the people who he meets on the trip. He also describes his impression of bullfighting. The book contains many poems that were written on the journey. He meets fellow travellers, as well as a thief, all the while trying desperately to learn the Spanish language. In the end he longs for his home in Denmark, the books last sentence being "I have to flee".

Kristensen is one of the most important Danish lyricists of the 20th Century. His restless spirit and fascination with bullfighting has drawn comparisons with Hemingway.

Kristensen's final years were spent on the island of Thurø near Svendborg, where he died at the age of 80, and is buried.

== Works in English ==
- Tom Kristensen: Havoc. New York Review Books (2018).
- Tom Kristensen: Havoc. New British adaption by Nordisk Books.
- Tom Kristensen: The Land called Atlantis. A Symbol. Transl. by W. Glyn Jones (in: Danish literary Magazine. – no. 5 (1993). (English translation of a famous poem from 1920).

== Works about the author ==
- Michael S. Byram: Tom Kristensen. Boston 1982.
