= Laura Brun-Pedersen =

Danish painter

Laura Oline Hedvig Brun-Pedersen (19 July 1883 – 7 March 1961) was a Danish painter. Born in Copenhagen, she studied art at the painting schools of Ernst Goldschmidt (1917–18) and Harald Giersing (1919-20). She painted deeply coloured landscapes with human figures and animals, often with scenes of forests. Many are painted on the island of Thurø near Svendborg where she lived for 30 years. In 1956, she was awarded the Thorvaldsen Medal. She died on 7 March 1961 and is buried in Assistens Cemetery.

== Literature ==
- Hein, Marianne (2005). Kunst og originaler: kunstnerlivet i Svendborg 1900-1975. SAK Kunstfond. ISBN 978-87-991112-0-6.
