= John Edward Fletcher =

British-Australian scholar

John Edward Fletcher (18 January 1940 – 1 June 1992) was a British-Australian scholar best known for his research and publications on Athanasius Kircher as well as several other Germans who had lived in and/or influenced Australia.

== Overview ==
=== Education ===
John Edward Fletcher was born in the industrial city of Bradford in Yorkshire to a printer/soldier father and a millworker mother. There he attended Thornton Grammar School of which in his final year he became Dux and School Captain.

He went on as a scholarship holder to read for his BA degree at Queen Mary College, University of London, where he studied under such famous scholars of German language as the Medievalist A.T. Hatto and the Renaissance and Baroque specialist Leonard Wilson Forster, later Schroeder Professor of German at Cambridge.

On graduating he moved on to the University of Durham to obtain Diploma of Education and then back to the Queen Mary College on a postgraduate scholarship intending to do his doctorate under Claus Viktor Bock on the 17th-century German polymath and polyglot Athanasius Kircher. His first task was to come to grip with Kircher's vast body of writings on most branches of learning of his age, for example: mathematics, astronomy, music, oriental languages - including Egyptian hieroglyphics, which Kircher was certain he had deciphered, but of course hadn't. The second task he and Dr. Bock set was to edit the immense correspondence from and to Kircher. Fletcher succeeded by 1966 in producing an extremely erudite thesis of over 900 pages - somewhere around the size of many of Kircher's own publications.

=== Instruction ===
Fletcher then emigrated to Australia and took up the position of Senior Teaching fellow in the Department of German at Monash University. Almost immediately he began to indulge his lifelong passion for books and bibliography.

In 1968 he took up the first full lectureship in German Baroque literature in the Department of German at Sydney University and was promoted to Senior Lecturer a few years later. He was to spend the rest of his life at Sydney University where he continued his research on Kircher.

His study leave was spent often in the British Museum Library, but more often in the Duke Augustus Library in the charming little north German town of Wolfenbuettel with its notable collection of 16th and 17th century books. Much of his research here was funded by the highly prestigious post-doctoral Alexander von Humboldt scholarship, which Fletcher had been awarded. He was also invited to organise the Library's international conference on Kircher and to edit the resulting book.

=== Publications ===
Back in Australia, John Fletcher worked particularly hard on books that threw light on all sorts of Australian-German contacts, especially of the 19th century. Amongst other things this led him to take part in the setting up of the Christopher Brennan Society, a literary society devoted to researching and publishing on the life and times of that brilliant but tragic figure in this university's history who had studied in Berlin around 1890, was famed as a poet in his own rights and who, as Associate Professor of Comparative Literature, lectured on several ancient, medieval and modern languages and literatures until he was sacked by the Australian Senate for adultery and/or drunkenness in 1925.

Later in his life he had begun publishing studies of Germans in 19th century Australia and published one also on the Tasmanian Frederick Sefton Delmer who was a university teacher in Germany at the turn of the century. Fletcher collected all the poetry publications other than anthologies that had appeared in New South Wales between 1950 and 1980 and he published a comprehensive catalogue of these in the process. He also created a collection of poetry books that is the envy of public and university librarians throughout the country because, as Brian Taylor stated in the obituary given for his friend, no library can possibly have certain of these books, since they never went on sale anywhere.

=== Late life ===
Soon after his arrival in Sydney, John Fletcher joined the Friends of the University Library and as a committee member, its treasurer, secretary and, at the time of his death, president. He was long a member of the Book Collectors Society of Australia and was at his death its president and Publications Editor, having produced his own last book in their series of Studies in Australian Bibliography.

== Select bibliography ==
=== Kircher ===
- Fletcher, John E., "A brief survey of the unpublished correspondence of Athanasius Kircher S J. (1602–80)", in: Manuscripta, XIII, St. Louis, 1969, pp. 150–60.
- Fletcher, John E., "Johann Marcus Marci writes to Athanasius Kircher", in: Janus, Leyden, LIX (1972), pp. 97–118
- Fletcher, John E., "Athanasius Kircher und seine Beziehungen zum gelehrten Europa seiner Zeit", Wiesbaden, Otto Harrassowitz, 1986 (Wolfenbütteler Arbeiten zur Barockforschung series, Band 17).
- Fletcher, John E., "Johann Marcus Marci writes to Athanasius Kircher", in: Janus, 59 (1972), pp 95–118.
- Fletcher, John E., Athanasius Kircher : A Man Under Pressure. Wiesbaden, Otto Harrassowitz, 1988.
- Fletcher, John E., Athanasius Kircher and Duke August of Brunswick-Lüneberg : A Chronicle of Friendship. Otto Harrassowitz, 1988.
- Fletcher, John E., Athanasius Kircher and His Correspondence. Wiesbaden, Otto Harrassowitz, 1988.
- Fletcher, John E., Athanasius Kircher und seine Beziehungen zum gelehrten Europa seiner Zeit, Wiesbaden, Otto Harrassowitz, 1988.
- Fletcher, John E., A Study of the Life and Works of Athanasius Kircher, "Germanus Incredibilis" . Edited by Elizabeth Fletcher. Brill Publications, Amsterdam, 2011.

=== Other ===
- John E. Fletcher, "German Books (1501–1800) in Australian Libraries: A Survey", in: Journal of the Australasian Universities Language and Literature Association, Volume 31, 1969, Issue 1, pp. 40–62.
- John Fletcher, Georg Philipp Harsdoerfer, Nuernberg, und Athanasius Kircher, Nuernberg: Verein fuer Geschichte der Stadt Nuernberg, 1972.
- John Fletcher and Marlene Norst, German Language Books in the Libraries of Canberra, Melbourne and New South Wales, North Ryde, N.S.W., Macquarie University, School of Modern Languages, German Section, 1972.
- John Fletcher, St. James' Church, Forest Lodge : A Chronicle of Parish Life (1877-1977), Forest Lodge, N.S.W.: St. James' Church, 1977.
- Axel Clark, John Fletcher and Robin Marsden, eds., Between Two Worlds: "Loss of Faith" and Late Nineteenth Century Australian Literature: Essays By Vincent Buckley ... [et al.], Sydney: Wentworth Books, 1979.
- John Fletcher and Rose Smith, A Short-Title Catalogue of Sixteenth Century Printed Books Held in Libraries and Private Collections in New South Wales, with a List of Provenances, Sydney: Library Council of New South Wales, 1979.
- Johannes H. Voigt, John Fletcher and John A. Moses, eds., New Beginnings: Germans in New South Wales and Queensland: A Commemorative Volume (Neuanfänge: Deutsche in New South Wales und Queensland: eine Festschrift), Stuttgart: Institute for Foreign Cultural Relations/Institut für Auslandsbeziehungen, 1983.
- John Edward Fletcher, John Degotardi : Printer, Publisher And Photographer, Sydney: Book Collectors' Society of Australia, 1984.
- John Edward Fletcher, German Manuscripts (1538-1864) in the Libraries of Sydney: A Descriptive Catalogue, Sydney : Book Collectors' Society of Australia, 1988.
- John Fletcher, Poetry Books and Poetry Broadsheets Published from 1950 to 1980 in South Wales: A Catalogue, Sydney: Book Collectors' Society of Australia, 1989.
- John Fletcher, The Story of William Nathaniel Pratt (1847-1933) and the Poems That Weren't Published in 1917, Sydney: Book Collectors' Society of Australia, 1990.
- John Edward Fletcher, The Jane Windeyer Bookplate Collection in the University of Sydney Library : A Catalogue, Sydney : Book Collectors' Society of Australia, 1990.
- John Fletcher, Frederick Sefton Delmer: From Herman Grimm and Arthur Streeton to Ezra Pound, Sydney: Book Collectors' Society of Australia, 1991.
- John Edward Fletcher, Hermann Lau and His Sojourns (1854-1859) in Sydney, Goulburn, Braidwood, Araluen, Moruya and Shoalhaven, Sydney: Book Collectors' Society of Australia, 1991.

== See also ==
- Book Collectors Society of Australia
