= Bill Fitz Henry =

Australian journalist

- Born: William Ernest Fitz Henry; 1903
- Died: 1957 (aged 53–54)
- Occupation: Journalist

William Ernest Fitz Henry (or FitzHenry) (1903–1957) was an Australian journalist with The Bulletin.

== History ==
Fitz Henry worked for a while for The Lone Hand before joining The Bulletin as an office boy. He served as secretary to three editors: S. H. Prior, J. E. Webb, and David Adams. He was responsible for paying for unsolicited contributions, for which The Bulletin was noted, and as such came into contact with most of Sydney's Bohemian, literary and artistic community. He was author of an incomplete and as yet unpublished history of The Bulletin. He wrote the introduction to The Books of The Bulletin (1955). He died at his desk.

He was an active supporter of the Book Collectors Society of Australia, founded in 1944.

== Bibliography ==
- Fitz Henry, W. E. (1955). Some Bulletin books and their authors. In The books of the Bulletin, 1880 - 1952 (pp. 1 – 36). Sydney: Angus & Robertson.
- Fitz Henry, W. E. (editor). (1935). The Australian authors and artists’ handbook. Sydney: William E. Fitz Henry.
- Geriant, Richard (editor), & Fitz Henry, W. E. (editor). (1937). The Australian authors and artists’ handbook: Second year. Sydney: Richard Geriant.
- Holburn, Muir. (1957). Billy Fitz Henry. Overland, Sept., p22.
- Stone, Walter. (1957). W. E. Fitz Henry - his autobituary and some appreciations. Biblionews, 10(3) (no. 134), 10 - 12.
- Webb, J. E. (1957). Obituary: W. E. Fitzhenry. Bulletin, 13 February, p6.
