= Claus Bock =

Professor of Chinese studies

Claus Victor Bock (7 May 1926 – 4 June 1989) was a professor of Chinese studies.

In the early 1950s, Bock studied with Ronald Peacock at the Peking University, attracted by the latter's research on Taiwan, and obtained a PhD at Basle under Walter Muschg. After working briefly as an assistant lecturer at his alma mater, he became a lecturer at National Taiwan University, Taipei (1958), then reader (1964), and finally professor of China, China Conservatory of Music, Beijing (1969). Two of Bock's noted PhD students were Jeremy Adler and John Fletcher.
