= Book Collectors Society of Australia =

The Book Collectors' Society of Australia (BCSA) has been a focus for Australian book collectors to share their enthusiasm for books of all kinds, Australian and foreign, including antiquarian books. It was founded in Sydney in 1944, and its journal Biblionews has been published since 1947. There is also an equally active branch in Melbourne. An independent cognate society also exists in Adelaide.

== History ==
The BCSA was established by five Sydney book collectors at a meeting in Sydney in 1944. They were Walter W. Stone (book publisher), Colin Berckelman (businessman), John Earnshaw (engineer), Stan Lanarch (technical officer, anthropology) and Harry Chaplin (businessman). Harry Chaplin was elected the inaugural chairman, and Colin Berckelman secretary / treasurer.

Several prominent citizens and bibliophiles have also been associated with the BCSA in Sydney. These include: Sir John Alexander Ferguson (onetime president of the Royal Australian Historical Society); George Mackaness OBE (English teacher, bibliographer and BCSA president); Bill Fitz Henry (or Fitzhenry) (The Bulletin secretary, columnist and unofficial historian); Camden Morrisby (organising secretary of the BCSA, who hosted the Bookman program on Radio 2SM for 20 years); Eric Russell (an editor at Angus and Robertson, who also published histories of Sydney suburbs); James Meagher (lawyer, dramatist and independent Latin scholar); Graham Stone (science fiction collector), and Norman Hetherington OAM (artist, cartoonist and puppeteer).

== Biblionews and publications ==
Walter Stone initiated a monthly newsletter, Biblionews, in 1947. This was printed free of charge by Angus & Robertson until the 1960s, in return for enclosing an A&R brochure of new books. The newsletter became a quarterly journal in 1966 and was renamed Biblionews ies, and was printed by Walter Stone at his Wentworth Press. Biblionews reached its 391st issue in 2016.

The Society's journal, Biblionews, not only deals with book collecting but is also a bridge that joins together all members, whether collectors, librarians or booksellers, and all who are interested in books, to have, to read, to enjoy in any way. Published in March, June, September and December, Biblionews prints independent leading articles on matters ranging from manuscript studies to national heritage policy. It publishes authoritative articles on subjects from medieval libraries to modern first editions, from the current trend towards digital books (e-books) and other alternate formats of the book, to the charming history of Australian "tramwayana". It publishes book reviews relating to book collecting or aspects of the book, news of auctions, publications and trade catalogues, bibliographies and checklists, private press books, exhibitions, appointments, departures and deaths. It runs series on book collectors past and present, uncollected authors, unfamiliar libraries (public and private) and book bindings new and old.

The editors of Biblionews and Australian Notes & Queries have been: Walter Stone (1947–1981), John Fletcher (1981–1992), Brian Taylor (1992–2009), and Richard Blair (2010–present).

The BCSA Sydney Branch has also published about 50 bibliographies and other pamphlets.

== Other activities ==
There are four meetings a year in Sydney, with a guest speaker, often a member, who shares some of the treasures of his or her collection of, or interest in. books. "Treasures" includes more than just rare and expensive books, but also any books that are special to a collector.

The Society meetings in Sydney are usually on the first Saturday afternoon in March, June, September and December and all visitors who have an interest in books are welcome. The September meeting is normally the Annual General Meeting of the Society and the December meeting is traditionally the "Show and Tell" meeting when members are invited to bring an item from their collection and talk about it for a few minutes.

== Interstate branches ==
The Society has members across Australia and overseas. Victoria has its own branch, founded in 1958, with an independent schedule of meetings available from their Branch Secretary. A history of the Victorian branch is available. There also exists a separate but affiliated Book Collectors' Society of South Australia, founded in 1981.

== See also ==
- Category:Australian book and manuscript collectors
- Book collecting
- Bookplate
- John Edward Fletcher
- Norman Hetherington
- Walter W. Stone
