= Inger Klein Thorhauge =

Faroese cruise ship captain

- Born: Inger Klein Olsen; Faroe Islands
- Occupation: Cruise ship Captain

Inger Klein Thorhauge is a Faroese cruise ship captain for Cunard Lines. When she was named Captain of MS Queen Victoria in 2010, she became the first female captain of a large cruise ship in history. She has since become captain of MS Queen Elizabeth, and in 2022 was named as the first captain of MS Queen Anne.

== Maritime career ==
Inger Klein Thorhauge's father worked in the Faroe Island's fishing fleet as an engineer. Her first sea going position was at the age of 16 when she worked as a stewardess on cargo ships during her school holidays. Thorhauge soon sought to pursue working on ships as a career, but not in the role she had already experienced. After undertaking training in Copenhagen for DFDS Seaways, she had the intention that she would work in the industry for several years before starting a family.

After obtaining her Master's Licence in 1994, she became interested in working in the cruise industry, joining Cunard Lines as a deck officer in 1997. Over the next 13 years, she worked her way up through the ranks. In 2010, she was named as the Captain of Cunard Lines' MS Queen Victoria. This was the first time a woman had been made captain of a Cunard Lines vessel. She was subsequently made Captain of the MS Queen Elizabeth in 2011. Since 2022, Thorhauge has been working on the build of MS Queen Anne as the new ship's first Captain. When not at sea, Thorhauge lives in Svendborg in Southern Denmark.
