= Anne Hvide's House =

Manor house in Svendborg, Denmark

Coordinates: 55°03′36″N 10°36′33″E

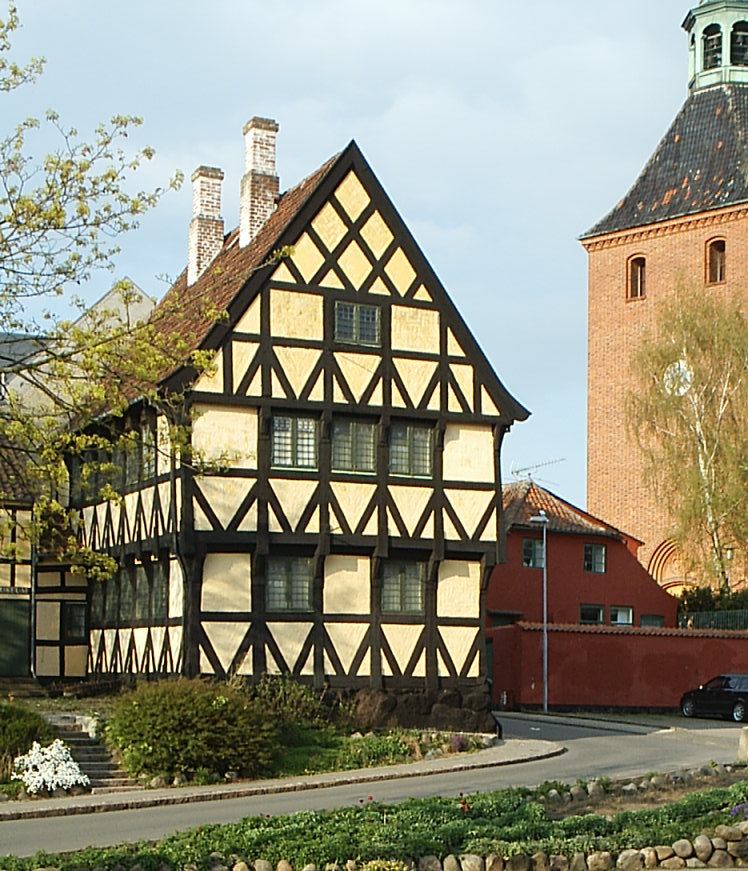
Anne Hvide's House (1560)

Anne Hvide's House (Danish: Anne Hvides Gård) is a two-storey, half-timbered building in Svendborg on the Danish island of Funen. One of the oldest houses in the town, it was built in 1560 by Anne Hvide, a widow of noble descent. It was used as an inn from 1837 to 1867. After being restored in 1916, it became a museum with exhibitions relating to the history of Svendborg.

== Background ==
Anne Hvide was the second last of the famous Danish Hvide clan founded by Skjalm Hvide in the 11th century. She was the wife of nobleman Jesper Friis who successfully led the artillery against the Lübeckers at Karnan near Helsingborg. At the time of his death in 1558, he and his wife lived in Rødkilde, an old manor house near Ulbølle to the west of Svendborg. Like many other ladies of her day, Anne Hvide wanted a house in the town where she could spend the winter months. On a plot she acquired near the Church of Our Lady, she and her husband began building a residence in 1557.

== Architecture ==
Built in the Renaissance style, the house is an eight-bay, two-storey half-timbered structure with a shallow cellar. The red-tiled roof slopes at an angle of 60 degrees. The timbering is painted black while the panels consist of patterned brickwork. The carved door out to Fruestræde stands at the top of four steps with iron railings. In 1978, the house was repainted in its original ochre yellow.

== Owners ==
Not a great deal is known about the house's ownership after Anne Hvide's death in 1577. Statesman Niels Krag of Egeskov owned the property around 1700, after which it came into the hands of his son Niels Krag until his death in 1740. It was then owned by Vice-admiral Hans Jacob Rostgaard (1685-1756) who died in the house on 2 June 1756. He was the last nobleman to live there.

After exchanging hands several times, the house was acquired by Nicolaj Børgesen in 1809. After his death in 1837, his third wife, Dorothea Svendsen, continued to run it as an inn for the next 30 years, gaining a reputation as a welcoming hostess and one of the best known people in Svendborg. Her son Nicolaj Børgesen inherited the property but after emigrating to America sold it to Ludvigsen, a builder, until it was bought by Svendborg Municipality in 1900. The attic was used as an archive and the first floor became the county library. For a period, it also became the mayor's office.

== Museum ==
In 1912, the building was acquired by Svendborg Amts Museum who undertook comprehensive restoration work before opening Svenborg Museum there in 1915. It operated there until 1974 when the museum moved into new premises. In the summer months, the museum now presents exhibits relating to the town's history.

== Literature ==
- Marcussen, Ove (1970). Svendborg Amts Museum: Anne Hvides Gaard.
