= Frederick Sefton Delmer =

Australian linguist and journalist (1864–1931)

Frederick Sefton Delmer (24 October 1864 – 7 April 1931) was an Australian linguistics university lecturer and journalist.

== Life ==
Delmer was born in Battery Point, Tasmania, to James Delmer (1837–1914), a Master mariner, and Margaret Sefton Burgess (1837–1886).

He studied at Trinity College of the University of Melbourne, graduating M. A., and continued his studies in Europe, where he made the acquaintance of Herman Grimm, son of Wilhelm Grimm. After his return to Australia, he was a teacher in 1896, but also wrote travel reports. He soon returned to Europe where he became a lecturer at the University of Königsberg in 1900 and, from 1901 to 1914, he was a lecturer at the Friedrich-Wilhelms-Universität in Berlin. He became a friend of Kaiser Wilhelm II. He married Isabella Mabel Hook (1879–1938) in 1901. They had a son, Sefton Delmer, and a daughter, Margaret Mabel Sefton Delmer (1905–1990).

In 1910, he published the book English Literature from Beowulf to Bernard Shaw, which was, for decades, a standard work for English lessons in German schools.

At the beginning of the First World War, he was held in the Ruhleben internment camp, with his family, because he refused to accept German citizenship and was suspected of being a spy. In 1917, he was deported to England as part of a prisoner exchange program. He was later active in Germany and Italy as a journalist, translator and interpreter.

He died in Rapallo, Italy, on 7 April 1931.

== Works ==
- English debating exercises and spoken essays: an aid for English conversational courses, 1912
- English Literature from Beowulf to Bernard Shaw, Berlin 1910 (with many re-editions until at least 1984. In 1951, the 22nd edition was published under the title From Beowulf to TS Eliot, for the Use of Schools, Universities and private students, with alterations, new chapters, and sections by H.S. Harvey, B. Litt.
