= John Earnshaw =

John William Earnshaw (1900–1982) was a self-taught Australian engineer, and inventor. He also researched and wrote about Australian history.

== Life and career ==
Earnshaw was born on 23 June 1900 in Randwick, New South Wales, the son of a noted Sydney horse trainer and dual Melbourne Cup winner Isaac Earnshaw (known as Ike). He served with the Royal Engineers in France during World War I. After the war, Earnshaw undertook many dangerous travels in Papua New Guinea.

He married Evelyn Hall in Sydney in 1929. The couple had four daughters.

Earnshaw set up a business, Reilax Engineering, which specialised in production-line problems. The business prospered for over 30 years in North Sydney, New South Wales, until he retired in 1969. He invented a number of machines for filling metal and glass containers for the food, cosmetics, chemical and pharmaceutical manufacturing industries. For the Red Cross Blood Bank, Earnshaw devised an oscillator for separating plasma from blood. He was a pioneer of industrial chromium plating in Sydney. His oil-free compressor was widely used on tractors, graders, road rollers and similar earthmoving equipment.

Earnshaw's spare time was filled with research into forgotten aspects of Australian history, uncovering new information about the Scottish Martyrs, judge-advocate David Collins, early Sydney cabinetmakers, and John George Lang – the first Australian short story writer. He authored several biographies for the Australian Dictionary of Biography.

In 1944, Earnshaw was a co-founder of the Book Collectors Society of Australia, and a lifelong supporter of the society. He owned a large collection of books specialising in Australian history and literature. Most were sold at auction in 1979.

He was also very active in, and a Fellow of, the Society of Australian Genealogists.

Earnshaw died on 11 October 1982. His books, papers and photographs are held by the State Library of New South Wales.

== Publications ==
Earnshaw, John (1959). Thomas Muir: Scottish martyr [Studies in Australian and Pacific History, no 1 (W. W. Stone, editor)]. Cremorne, NSW: Stone Copying Company.

Earnshaw, John (1971). Early Sydney cabinetmakers 1804 – 1870: A directory with an introductory survey. Sydney: Wentworth Books. ISBN 0855870028.
