= Mac Baren =

Danish manufacturer of tobacco products

Mac Baren Tobacco Company A/S
- Type: Subsidiary
- Industry: Tobacco
- Founded: 1887 (as Harald Halberg Tobaks and Cigarfabrik)
- Headquarters: Svendborg, Denmark
- Key people: Harald Halberg (founder), Henrik Halberg (owner), Per Buch (CEO)
- Products: Pipe tobacco, rolling tobacco, water pipe tobacco, chewing tobacco, cigarillos
- Owner: Halberg A/S
- Number of employees: 140
- Website: mac-baren.com

The Mac Baren Tobacco Company, formerly Harald Halberg, Tobaks- og Cigarfabrik, is a Danish manufacturer of tobacco products. The company manufactures a range of pipe tobaccos, rolling tobaccos and smokeless tobaccos in their factory in Svendborg. Scandinavian Tobacco Group purchased the company June 2024.

The company was established in 1887, when founder Harald Halberg purchased Svend Bønnelycke's tobacco spinning mill and continued as a modern tobacco factory under the name Harald Halberg Tobaks- og Cigarfabrik. (Harald Halberg Cigar- and Tobacco factories) The company was renamed the Mac Baren Tobacco Company in 1995, as the company had become synonymous with its successful Mac Baren line of pipe tobaccos.

== History ==
The company traces its history back to 1826 when Svend Bønnelycke (1800-1876) established a tobacco factory in Svendborg. It was in 1887 acquired by Harald Halberg (1850' 1919) and later taken over by his son Einar Halberg (born 1881) and grandson Jørgen Halberg (born 1915).

== Products ==
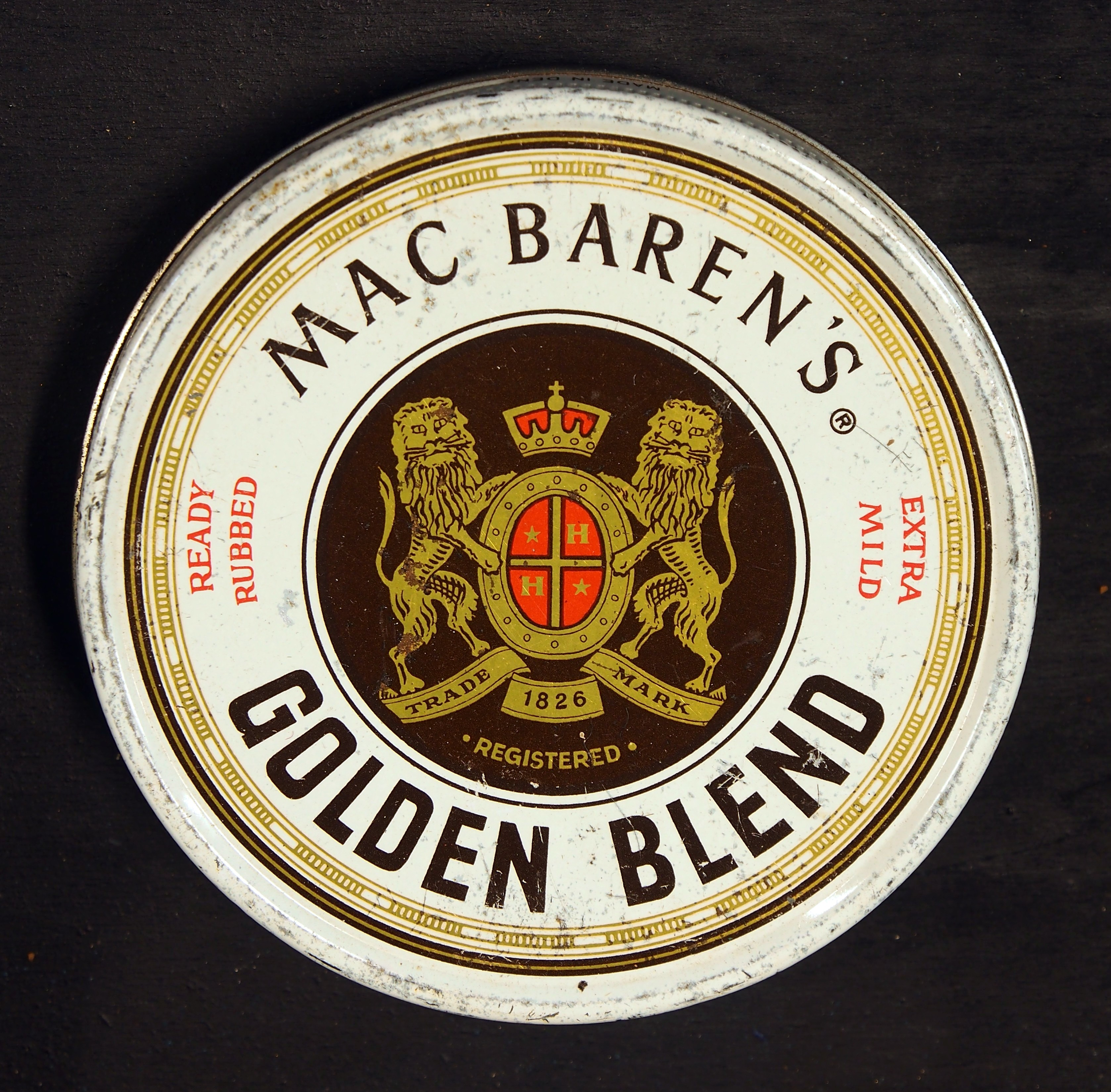
A tin of Mac Baren tobacco

The company's most popular line of tobaccos is currently its Mixture line of pipe tobaccos, introduced in 1958. Mac Baren's Choice series is a line of mild aromatic pipe and flavoured hand-rolling tobaccos aimed at a younger audience. In 2010, Mac Baren introduced 7 Seas, a line of American-style aromatic pipe tobaccos broadly similar to, and intended to compete with, STG's Captain Black.

In 2013, Mac Baren agreed to purchase Sutliff Tobacco, the Pipe Tobacco Division of Altadis USA, immediately renaming the company back to its original name of Sutliff Tobacco Company. Sutliff was thereafter appointed distributor of all Mac Baren products sold in the United States.

In 2024 Mac Baren was purchased by Scandinavian Tobacco Group.
