= Thurø =

Small Danish island in the south-east of Funen

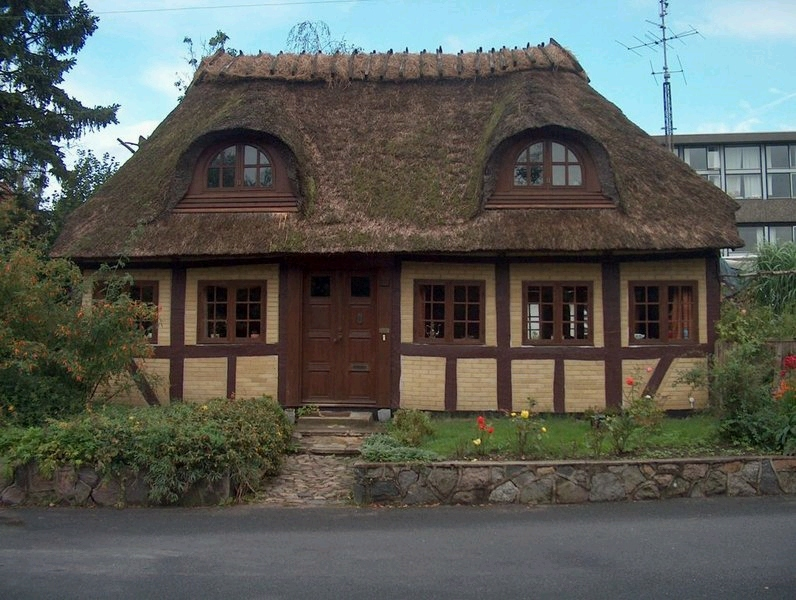
- A house on Thurø

- Location within Denmark

Geography
- Location: Baltic Sea
- Coordinates: 55°2′33″N 10°40′56″E 55°2'33"N 10°40'56"E
- Area: 7.5 km^{2} (2.9 sq mi)

Administration
- Denmark
- Region: Southern Denmark
- Municipality: Svendborg

Demographics
- Population: 3,555 (2014)

Additional information
- Time zone: CET (UTC+1)
  - Summer (DST): CEST (UTC+2)

Thurø is a small Danish island in the south-east of Funen and belongs to the Svendborg municipality. Thurø is part of the South Funen Archipelago, comprising c. 55 islands altogether. The island had 3,555 inhabitants as of 2014.

Connected to Svendborg proper by a small bridge, Thurø has become a popular place to live due to its quiet streets and proximity to both Svendborg and the new motorway to Odense.

Thurø is also a holiday destination, with two popular sandy beaches, three campsites and a number of houses for rent.

The sea around horseshoe-shaped Thurø is considered fine fishing-water, particularly for trout. There are several small harbours around the island and Thurøbund - the inner part of the horseshoe - is a well-known safe natural harbour used by the sailing fraternity.

The entire island is served by a direct bus link to Svendborg city centre, from where onward routes cover the Funen region.

== History ==
According to legend, and as told in Saxo's Gesta Danorum (chronicles of the Danes), as well as in the Scylding Sagas, Helge (brother to Hrothgar, both known from the Beowolf poems) once came by this island on one of his raiding expeditions. Here, he came to the house of the elf-woman Thora (Thurø meaning literally "Thora's island", or in some legends, "Thor's Island"), whom he raped. When he returned to the island years later, Thora sent out their daughter, Yrsa, to greet him, as revenge. He either raped, or fell in love with and married, Yrsa, not knowing she was his own daughter, and she then had his son, Hrólfr Kraki, who would go on to become one of Denmark's greatest and most legendary kings. When Helge learned that Yrsa was his daughter, he committed suicide.

Denmark's oldest "pacifier-tree" has been located on Thurø for 85 years. Part of Danish tradition is for children to "sacrifice" their pacifiers (dummies) at a local tree to mark their passage from infancy to childhood.

== Notable people ==
- Karin Michaëlis (1872-1950) a Danish journalist and author; from 1933 she took in German emigrants at her property in Thurø, including Bertolt Brecht and Marlene Norst; she is buried in Thurø cemetery
- Laura Brun-Pedersen (1883–1961) a Danish painter of deeply coloured landscapes with human figures and animals; she lived on Thurø for 30 years
- Tom Kristensen (1893 in London – 1974 in Thurø) was a Danish poet, novelist, literary critic and journalist
- Jan Pytlick (born 1967 in Thurø) a Danish handball coach. He was head coach for the Danish women's national handball team 1998-2006 and 2007-2014

== Sources ==
- Den lille Svendborgguide Guide to Svendborg and surroundings (in Danish)
