= Julius Duboc =

German author and philosopher

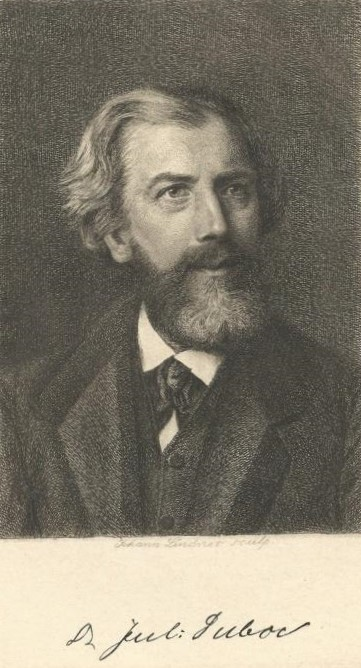
Julius Duboc, c. 1900

Julius Duboc (October 10, 1829 Hamburg - June 11, 1903) was a German author and philosopher.

== Biography ==
Karl Julius Duboc was the brother of the writer and painter Charles Edouard Duboc (1822 - 1910). He studied in Leipzig, Giessen, and Berlin. During his studies he became a member of the Cattia Gießen fraternity in 1849. He also became a student of Ludwig Feuerbach.

In his philosophical writings, Duboc propagated a form of ethically reverent atheism and defended optimism in opposition to Arthur Schopenhauer's pessimism. He critiqued Friedrich Nietzsche in his 1897 "Anti-Nietzsche" (Dresden: Helmuth Henkler). He also published historical works as well as essays and novellas. He died in Niederlößnitz in 1903 and was cremated in the Crematorium Gotha.

== Works ==
Evolutionary monism, atheism and the doctrine that pleasure is the end of all human activity find expression in his works, which include:

- Soziale Briefe (“Letters on society,” 3rd ed. 1873)
- Geschichte der Englischen Presse (“History of the English press,” 1873)
- Die Psychologie der Liebe (“The psychology of love,” 1874)
- Das Leben ohne Gott, Untersuchungen über den ethischen Gehalt des Atheismus (“Life without God, studies on the ethical content of atheism,” 1875)
- Gegen den Strom (“Against the tide,” a collection of his earlier essays, 1877)
- Der Optimismus als Weltanschauung (“Optimism as a way of looking at the world,” 1881)
- Hundert Jahre Zeitgeist in Deutschland (“A hundred years of the spirit of the times in Germany,” 1889)
- Jenseits von Wirklichen (“On the other side from reality,” 1896)
- Anti-Nietzsche (Expanded separate publication from "Jenseits vom Wirklichen," 1897)
- Die Lust als sozialethisches Entwicklungsprinzip (“Desire as a principle of social development,” 1900)
- Fünfzig Jahre Frauenfrage in Deutschland (“Fifty years of the woman question in Germany,” a collection of essays)

== Bibliography ==
- Renate Vollbrecht (1959). "Duboc, Julius". Neue Deutsche Biographie (in German). Vol. 4. Berlin: Duncker & Humblot. pp. 145–146. (full text online).
- Rines, George Edwin, ed. (1920). "Duboc, Julius" . Encyclopedia Americana.
