= Elisabeth Meyer (composer) =

Danish composer

Katharina Elisabeth Tuxen Meyer (b. 19 July 1859, d. 4 July 1927) was a Danish composer. She was born in Svendborg, Denmark, sister of singer Marie English. She studied music with her mother and possibly composers Hans Jørgen Malling and Ludwig Birkedal Barford. She married and had four children, and died in Copenhagen. She published under the name Elisabeth Tuxen.

== Works ==
Meyer wrote about sixty songs and a cantata (lost). Selected works include:

- The Lark
- Berceuse for violin and pianoforte
- Naar Duggen falder for pianoforte
