= Svendborg =

Town in Funen, Denmark

- Town
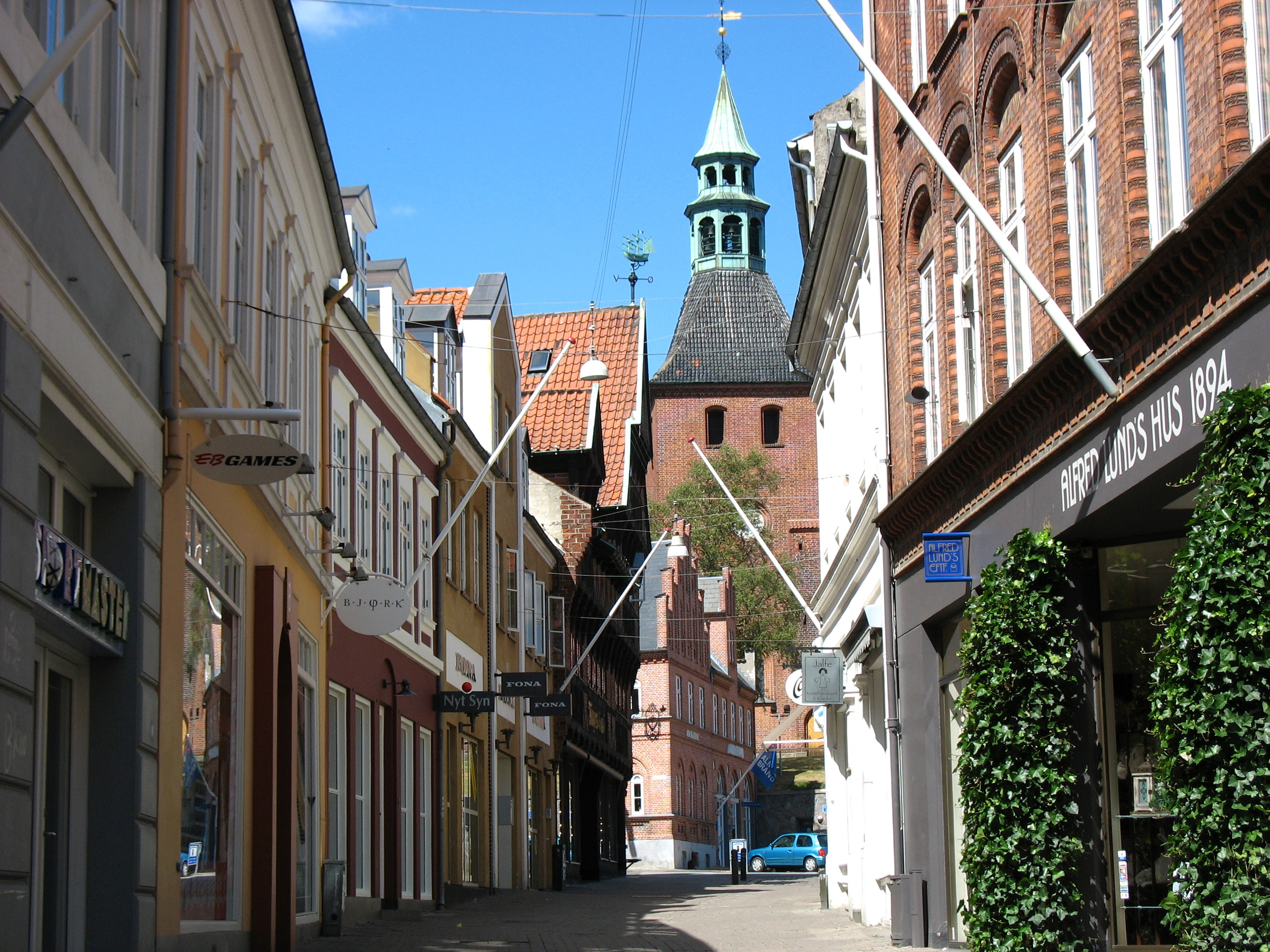
- Kattesundet Street and Vor Frue Church

- Coat of arms

- Location in Denmark Svendborg (Region of Southern Denmark)
- Coordinates: 55°3′34″N 10°36′30″E
- Country: Denmark
- Region: Southern Denmark
- Municipality: Svendborg

Area
  - Urban: 13.8 km^{2} (5.3 sq mi)

Population (2026)
  - Urban: 27,593
  - Urban density: 2,000/km^{2} (5,180/sq mi)
  - Gender: 13,340 males and 14,253 females
- Demonym: Svendborgenser Svendborger
- Time zone: UTC+1 (CET)
  - Summer (DST): UTC+2 (CEST)

Svendborg (Danish: [ˈsvenˌpɒˀ]) is a town on the island of Funen in south-central Denmark, and the seat of Svendborg Municipality. With a population of 27,593 (1 January 2026), Svendborg is Funen's second largest city. In 2000 Svendborg was declared "Town of the year" in Denmark, and in 2003 it celebrated its 750th anniversary as a market town. By road, Svendborg is located 195 kilometres (121 mi) southwest of Copenhagen, 183 kilometres (114 mi) south of Aarhus, 44.2 kilometres (27.5 mi) south of Odense, and 28.5 kilometres (17.7 mi) east of Faaborg.

Svendborg is home to "Danmarks Forsorgsmuseum" social history museum and "Naturama" natural history museum. The latter holds a wide variety of taxidermy from whales and bears to birds and Foxes.

The largest container ship company in the world, A.P. Møller-Mærsk has its origins in Svendborg, in the "Villa Anna".

== History ==
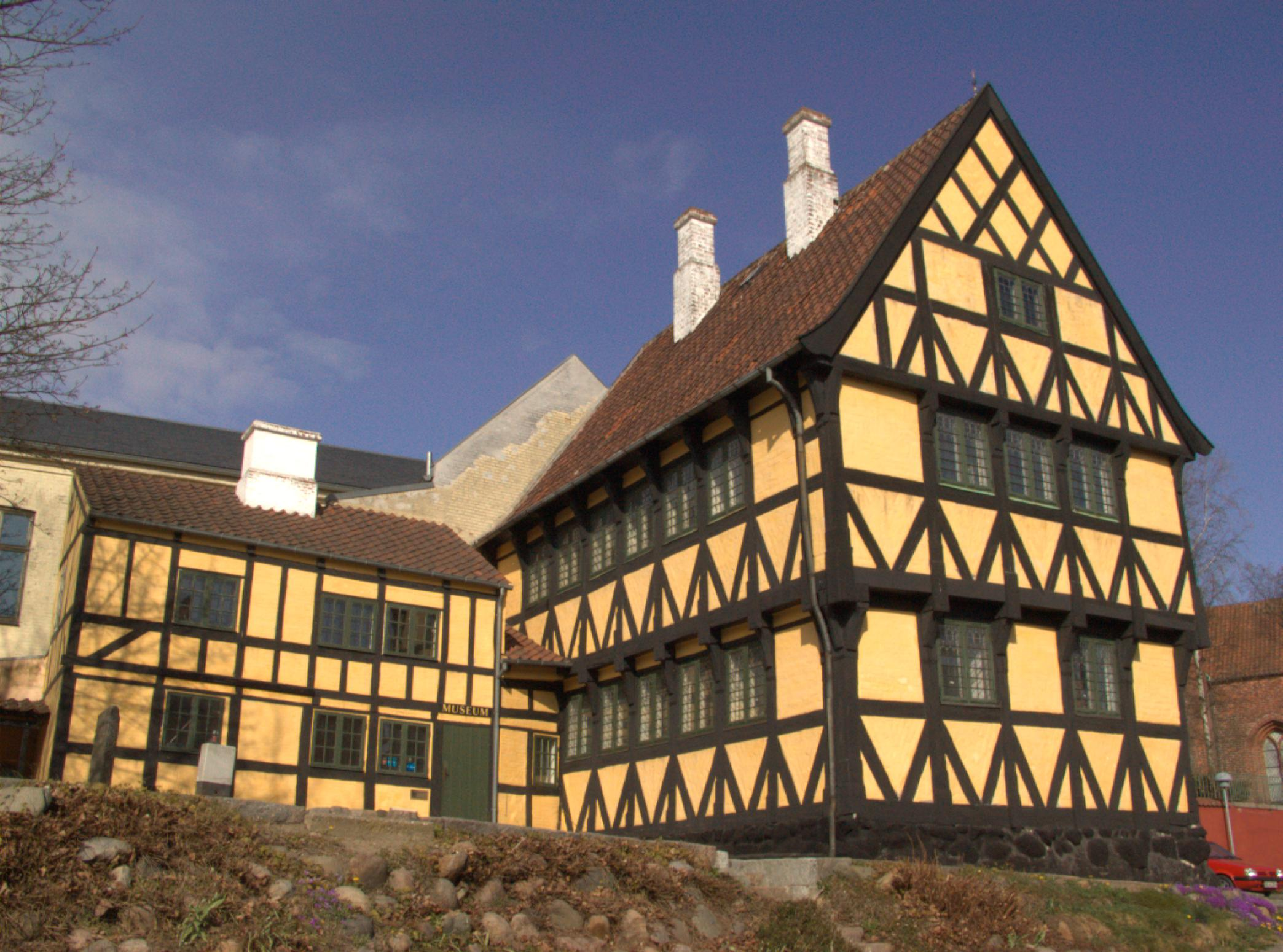
Anne Hvides Gaard (c. 1560) is Svendborg's oldest residential building, now Svendborg Museum

=== Early history ===
In the light of archaeological discoveries, Svendborg appears to have been established in the first half of the 12th century or even earlier. Located at the head of a bay, the natural harbour encouraged seafaring and trade.

The first recorded mention of Svendborg occurred in 1229 in a deed of gift by Valdemar the Victorious, where he refers to the fortification as Swinæburgh. The name is thought to consist of the elements "svin" meaning "pig" and "borg" meaning "fortification". In 1236, the Greyfriars monastery in Svendborg was established. The Greyfriars would be part of the city for the next 300 years, until the Protestant reformation in 1536. The ruins of the monastery were partly excavated beside the railway in 2007.

=== Middle Ages ===
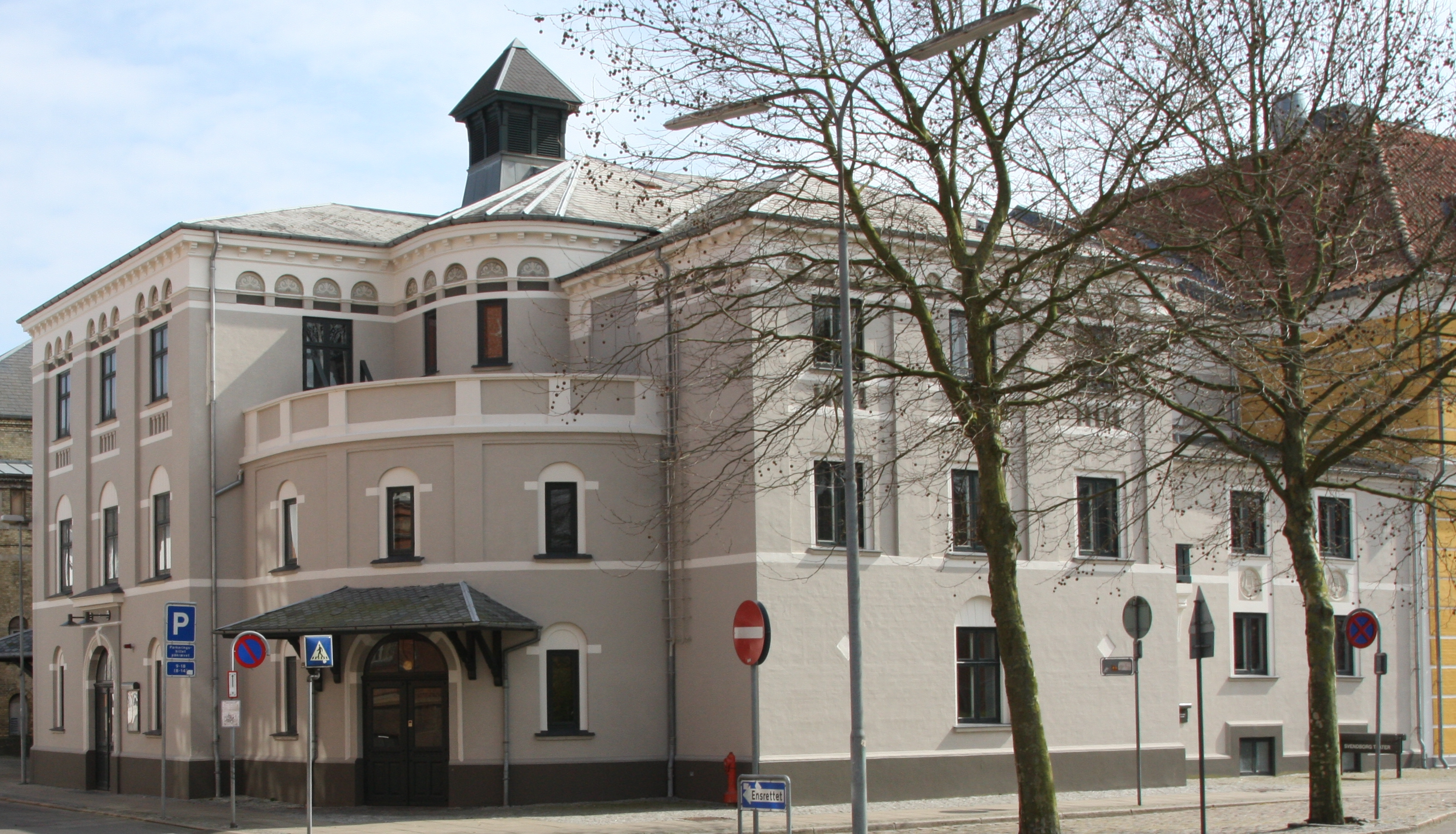
Svendborg Theatre

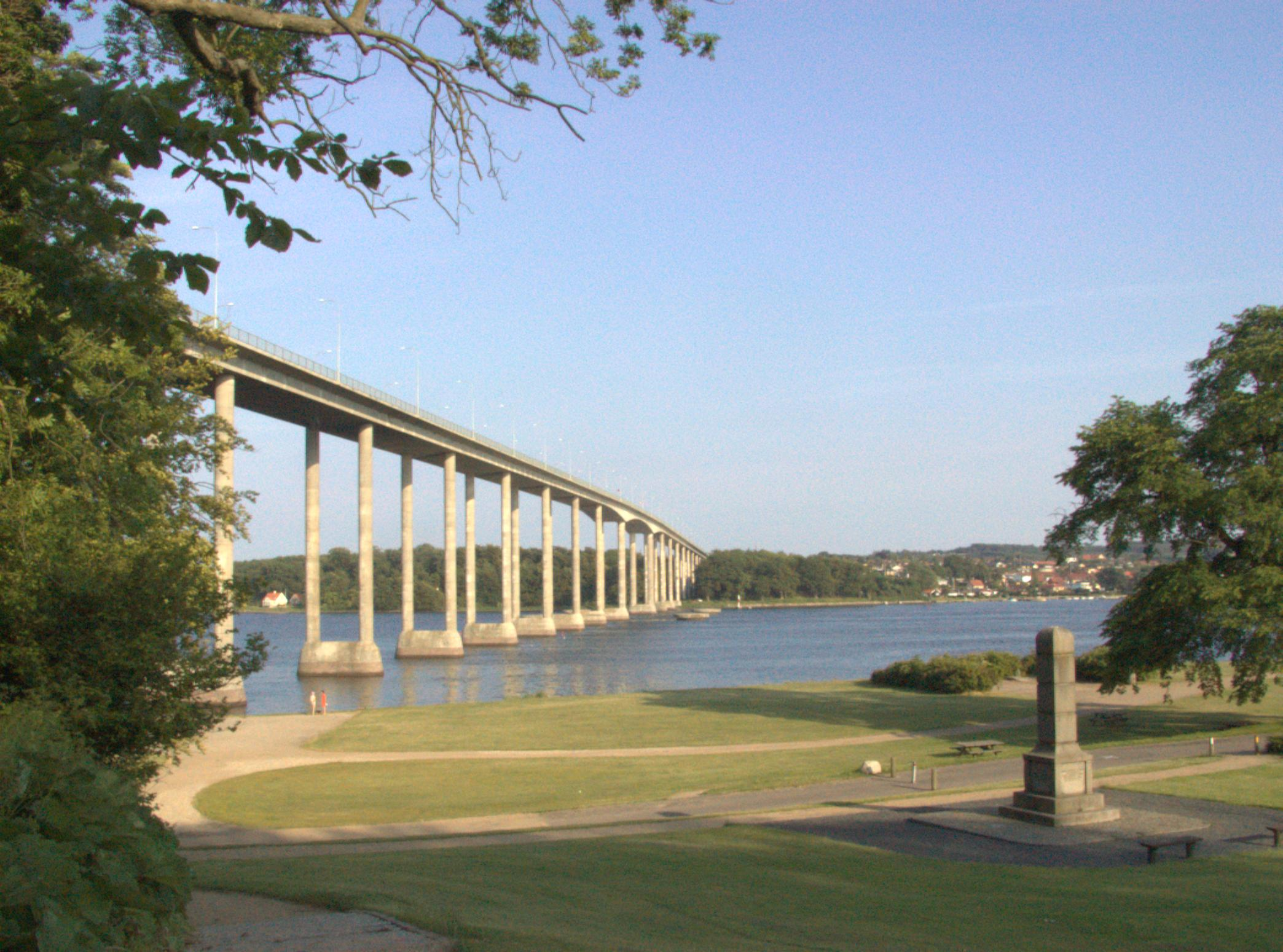
Svendborgsund Bridge

In 1253, the city was granted market town privileges by King Christopher I. In the Middle Ages, the city was fortified with walls and moats. The defense system also included a few of forts. Most historical facts about the medieval defense system, including the locations of fortifications, are disputed, as little archaeological evidence has been generated. In spite of this, it is a popular theory that the three towers in the coat of arms are the three fortifications ("Skattertårnet", "Kyseborg" and a third one unnamed). Thanks to its seafarers, in the late Middle Ages Svendborg became one of the most important trading centres in Scandinavia.

=== 16th and 17th centuries ===
During the time of the Protestant reformation and the Count's Feud in the 1530s, the citizens of Svendborg joined forces with the King. Ørkild Castle, located just east of Svendborg, was property of the bishop of Odense, who was less than popular among the citizens of the city. The tension resulted in the castle being seized and burned down by an angry mob in collaboration with the King's forces. The King's forces would later, after ending their north-going campaign on Funen, return to pillage and plunder Svendborg.

After 1536, Svendborg went through a brief period of progress becoming the islands main port. But it would not last for long. In the following 250 years, the city faced various setbacks in its development, such as plague, a major fire, and the effects of the Swedish wars when Svendborg's ships were destroyed.

=== Industrial development ===
It was not until the end of the war with the United Kingdom of Great Britain and Ireland and the Industrial Revolution in the early 19th century that the city returned to a period of increasing prosperity. The population grew from a mere 1,942 people in 1801 to more than 11,500 in 1901. This development was followed by improvement of the infrastructure, such as rail links with Odense, Faaborg and Nyborg, improvement of the local roads and the establishment of a real harbour suited for extensive trading, since goods could now easily be transported there. In the middle of the 19th century an explosion of industrialization happened, and all kinds of factories, from engineering to breweries were established together with modern gas and water systems.

In the late 19th century, with industry well established, it was necessary to accommodate the growing population. This led to numerous new schools being founded. Furthermore, a hospital was established in 1871 and expanded in 1891.

=== 20th century to present ===
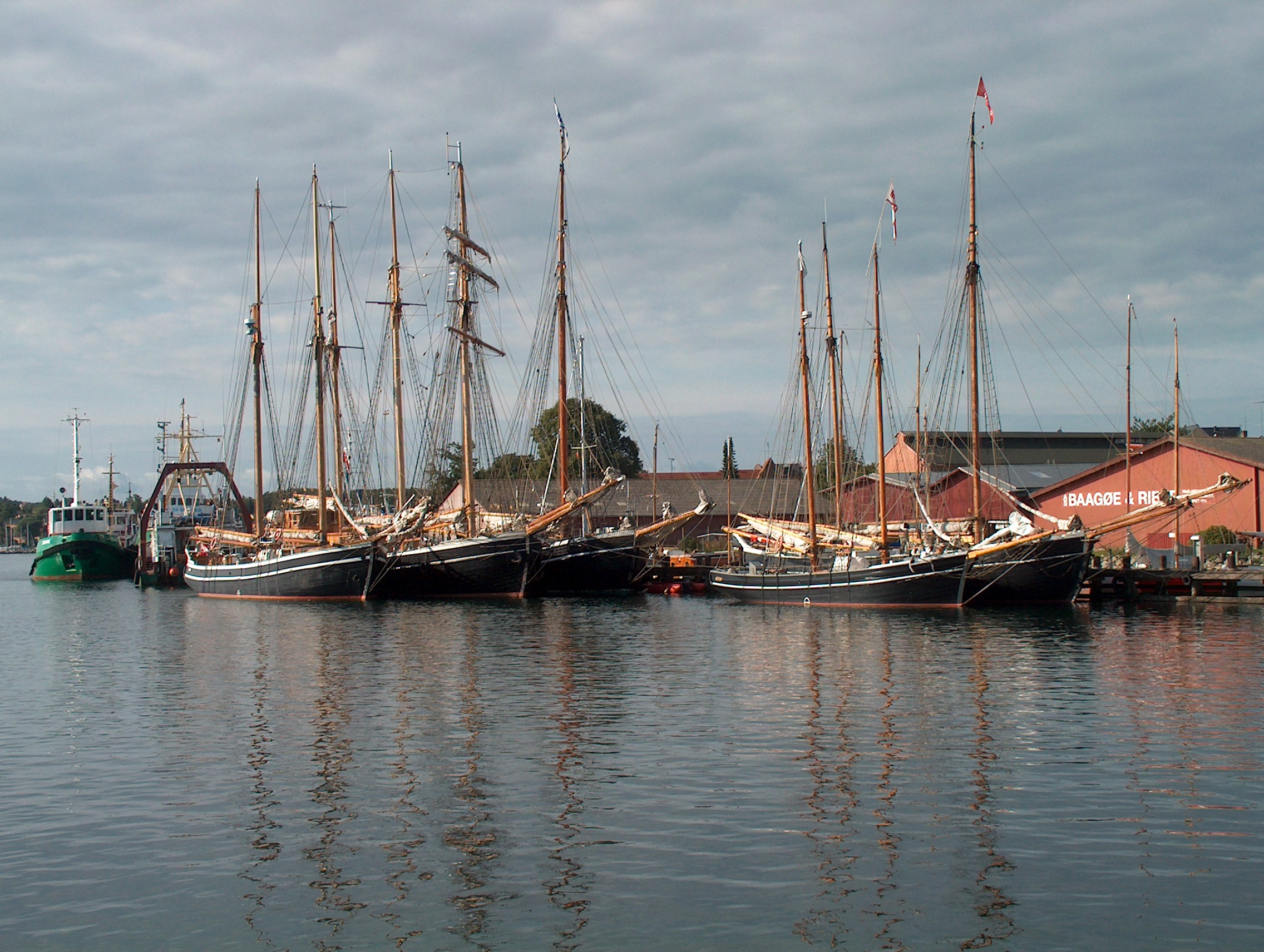
Svendborg Harbour

The rapid increase in population continued at the beginning of the 20th century as Svendborg developed into an even more important industrial and educational centre. The food and metallurgy sectors became well established. The port prospered with new facilities, including shipyards such as Svendborg Skibsværft which was established in 1907 on an artificial island. On the educational front, a number of maritime and navigational schools were established. The shipyard, which had employed up to 800 in the 1980s finally closed in 2001, some of the facilities being taken over by Vestas. In recent years, there has been a marked transition from industry into the service sector, the hospital now being one of the principal employers. Tourism has also prospered, especially for those arriving in pleasure boats.

The German writer Bertolt Brecht spent the first years of his exile from Nazi Germany in Svendborg. The town provided the title of a collection of Brecht's poems "Svendborger Gedichte" (Svendborg Poems).

== Geography ==
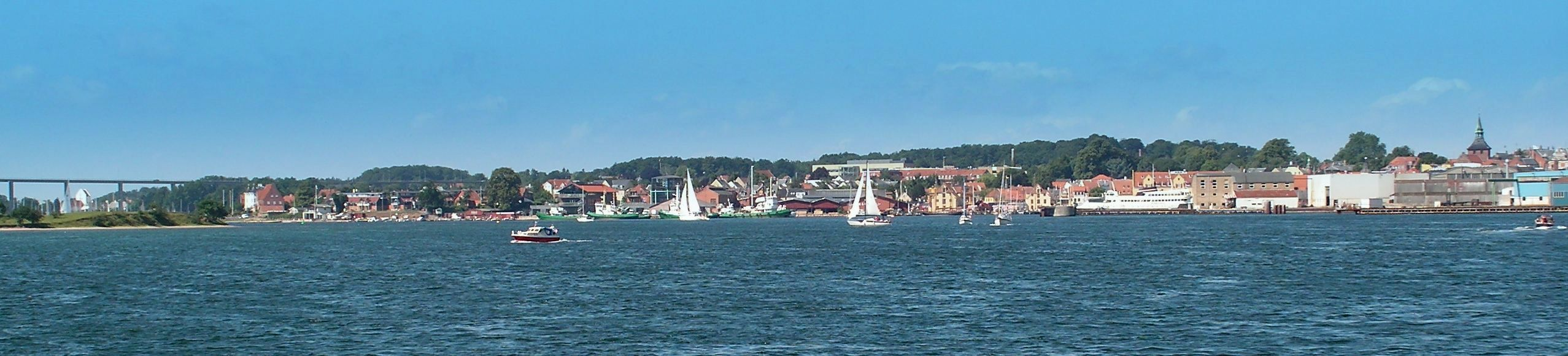
Panorama of the coast of Svendborg

Svendborg lies on the south coast of Funen. By road, Svendborg is located 195 kilometres (121 mi) southwest of Copenhagen, 44.2 kilometres (27.5 mi) south of Odense, 85.8 kilometres (53.3 mi) southeast of Middelfart, and 28.5 kilometres (17.7 mi) south-southeast of Faaborg. The Port of Svendborg is accessed by several channels, feeding through the islands of Tåsinge and Thurø. Svendborg Sund approaches the town from the southwest, along which ferries coming from Ærøskøbing pass the smaller islands of Drejø, Hjortø, and Skarø. Between Tåsinge and Thurø is Thurø Sund, which passes Bregninge forest (Bregninge Skov) on the northeast coast of Tåsinge, approaching the port of Svendborg from the south. From the east, between mainland Funen and the island of Thurø, is the narrow Skårupøre Sund.

To the west of Svendborg are several lakes, including Sørup Lake (Sørup Sø), 3.8 kilometres (2.4 mi) northwest of the centre, and Hvidkilde Lake (Hvidkilde Sø), 5.8 kilometres (3.6 mi) northwest of the centre of Svendborg. Several forested areas lie to the north-northwest of Svendborg, including Græsholmene, Løvehave, and Ravnebjerg Skov.

== Economy ==
The largest container ship company in the world, A.P. Møller-Mærsk has its origins in Svendborg, in the "Villa Anna". The company remained in the hands of Mærsk Mc-Kinney Møller until his death in 2012 at the age of 98.

The Mac Baren tobacco factory was established in Svendborg in 1887, under the name Harald Halberg Tobaks and Cigarfabrik. The company was renamed the Mac Baren Tobacco Company in 1995. The company employs 140 people, and exports tobacco products to 70 countries.

== Landmarks ==
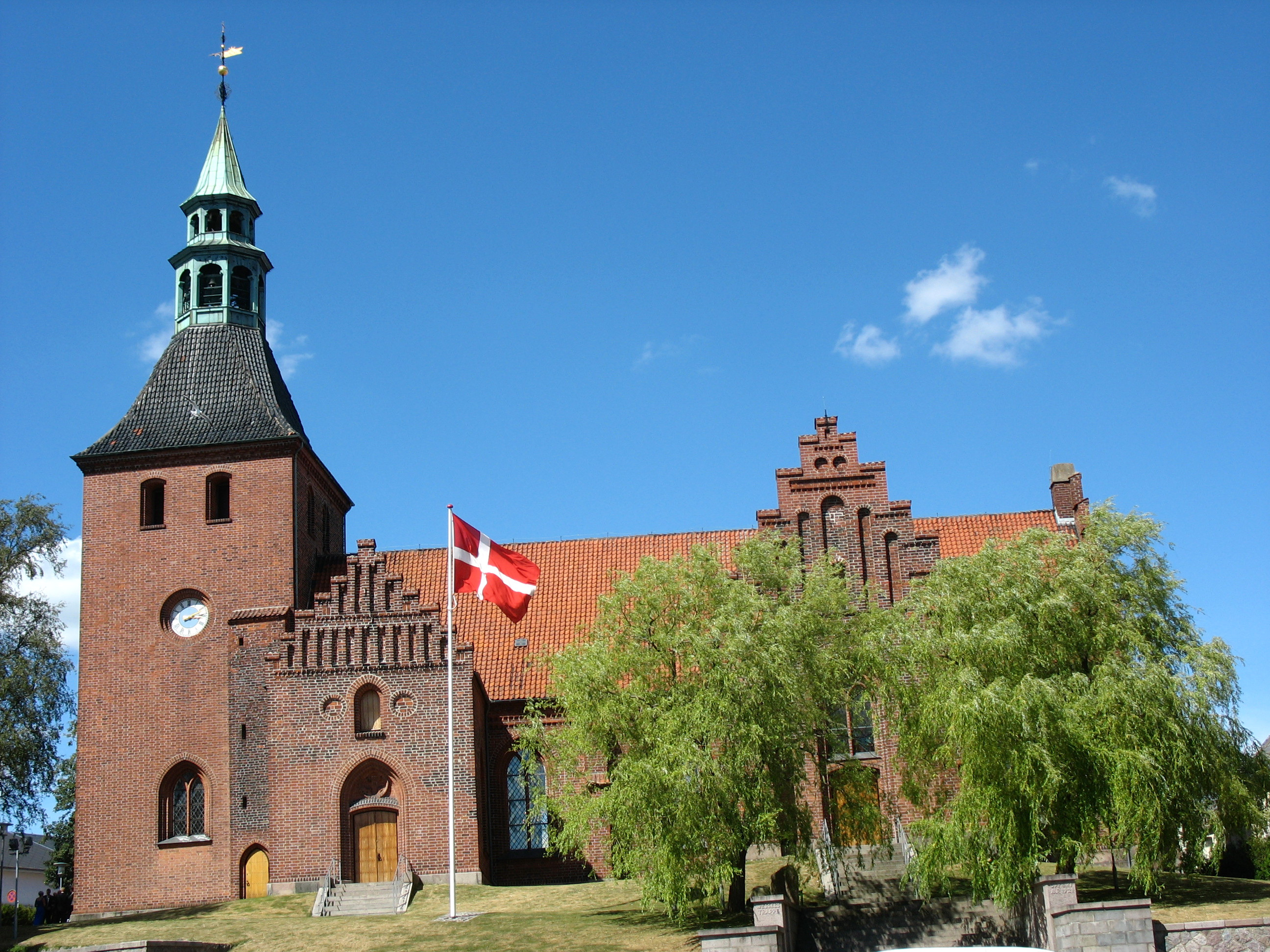
Vor Frue Kirke

Vor Frue Kirke (Church of Our Lady) located on a hill north of the market square was established in the 13th century but was enlarged in the late Middle Ages with a Gothic chancel, transepts and tower. A spire was added in 1768. The oldest section is the red-brick, Romanesque nave. Today the church reflects the comprehensive restoration work undertaken by Ove Petersen in 1884. The altar, pulpit and other artefacts date from the 17th century.

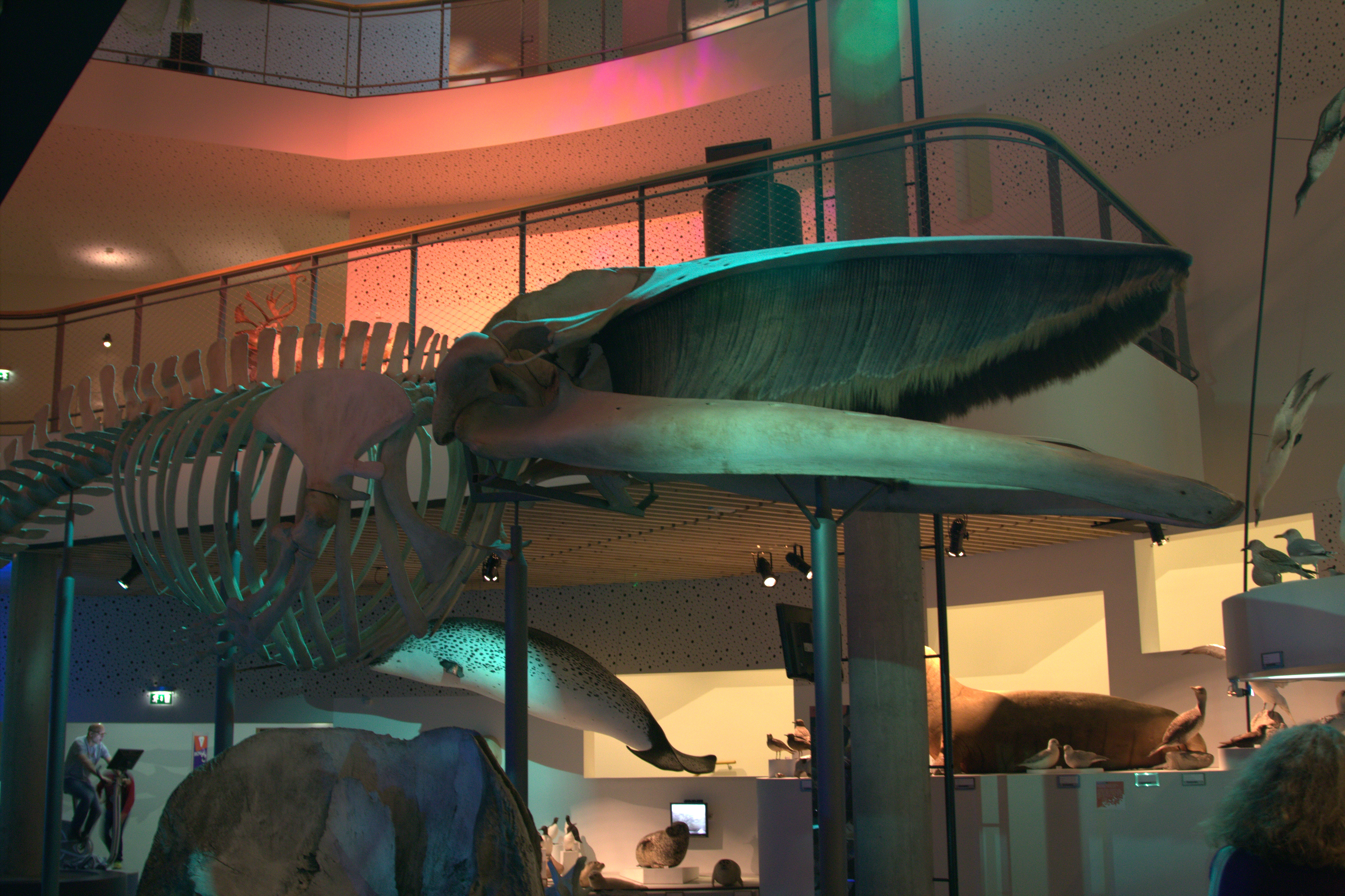
Naturama

Anne Hvide's House (Anne Hvides Gård), a two-storey, half-timbered building, is one of Svendborg's oldest houses. Anne Hvide, a widow of noble descent, had it built in 1560. It was used as an inn from 1837 to 1867. After being restored, it became the town museum in 1916. It still belongs to Svenborg Museum who use it for exhibitions on the history of Svendborg during the summer months.

Naturama, established in April 2005, is a natural history museum enhanced by means of various technological support features including light and sound, film, and expedition scenarios. It has a large collection of stuffed animals and birds in natural surroundings. A recent addition has been an exhibition depicting the world of spiders.

Svendborg contains a branch of the Odense University Hospital, Odense Universitetshospital - Svendborg Sygehus. It also contains the Svendborg Museum.

Attractions close to Svendborg include Egeskov, the best preserved Renaissance water castle in Europe, Valdemar's Castle on the nearby island of Tåsinge, and Hesselagergård, a historic manor to the north of Svendborg.

== Education ==
A branch of UCL University College (Danish: UCL Erhvervsakademi og Professionshøjskole) can be found in Svendborg. Svendborg is also the home of Svendborg Gymnasium which is one of the larger upper secondary schools in Denmark with more than 1,000 students and around 100 teachers. Furthermore, it also has Svendborg Erhvervsskole, which is the largest educational institute in Southern Funen.

== Notable people ==
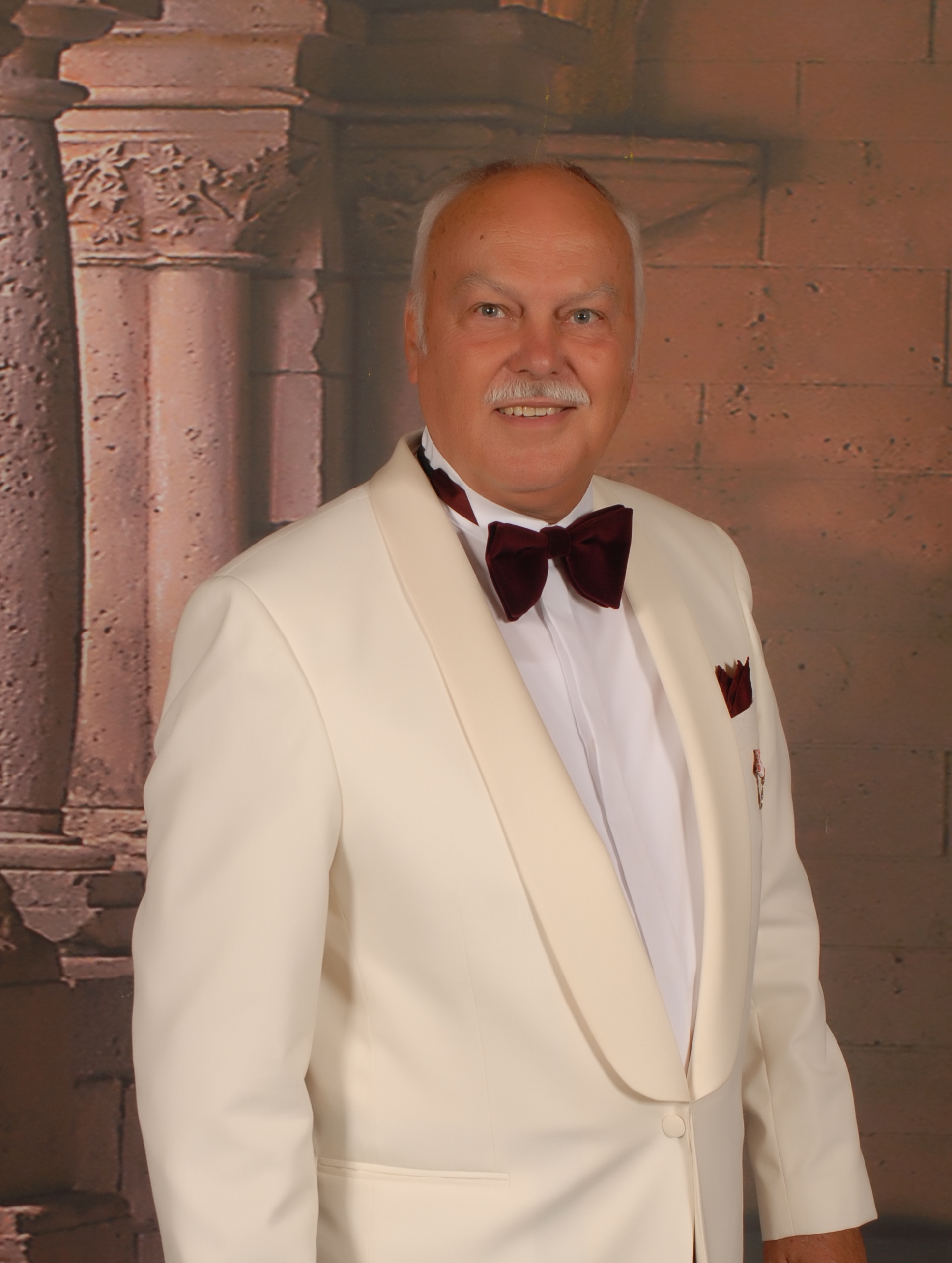
Leif Bjorno, 2014

- Hans Gaas (c. 1500 in Svendborg – 1578) a Norwegian clergyman and Bishop of Nidaros
- Nielsine Nielsen (1850 in Svendborg – 1916) the first female academic and physician in Denmark
- Christian Klengenberg (1869 in Svendborg – 1931) a whaler and trapper in Point Hope, Alaska
- Arnold Peter Møller (1876–1965) a Danish shipping magnate and businessman who founded A.P. Moller-Maersk Group in 1904; lived in Svendborg
- Grethe Meyer (1918 in Svendborg – 2008) an architect and designer of cutlery and dinnerware
- Leif Bjørnø (1937 in Svendborg – 2015) professor and well known acoustician
- Inge Prytz Johnson (born 1945 in Svendborg) a lawyer, Senior United States District Judge
- Jesper Lützen (born 1951 in Svendborg) an historian of mathematics and the physical sciences
- Annette Vilhelmsen (born 1959 in Svendborg) a politician, member of Folketing 2011–2015
- Rune Bech (born 1966) Danish journalist turned digital entrepreneur, lives in Svendborg
- Inger Klein Thorhauge (born c. 1970) a Faroese cruise ship captain for Cunard Lines, lives in Svendborg.
- Trine Bramsen (born 1981 in Svendborg) a Danish politician and Government minister

=== The Arts ===
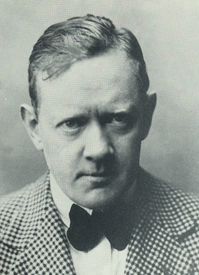
Kai Nielsen, 1915

- Elisabeth Meyer (1859 in Svendborg - 1927) a Danish composer
- Johannes Jørgensen (1866 in Svendborg – 1956) a writer of biographies of Catholic saints, nominated for the Nobel Prize in Literature five times
- Alma Hinding (1882–1981) a Danish film actress of the silent era, acted for Nordisk Film
- Kai Nielsen (1882 in Svendborg – 1924) a Danish sculptor
- Bertolt Brecht (1898–1956), a German playwright and poet; lived in Svendborg 1933/1939.
- Miskow Makwarth (1905 in Sørup, near Svendborg – 1992) a Danish film actor 1937 to 1976
- Bent Mejding (born 1937 in Svendborg) a Danish actor, stage director and theatre manager
- Maren Louise Käehne (born 1976 in Svendborg) screenwriter of episodes of Borgen and The Bridge
- Johnson (rapper) (born 1979 in Svendborg) stage name of Marc Kwabena Johnson, a Danish rapper
- UFO (musician) (born 1981 in Svendborg) stage name of Kristian Humaidan, a Danish rapper
- Sarah-Sofie Boussnina (born 1990 in Svendborg) a Danish actress
- UFO & Yepha (active 2002–2011) a Danish hip-hop music duo

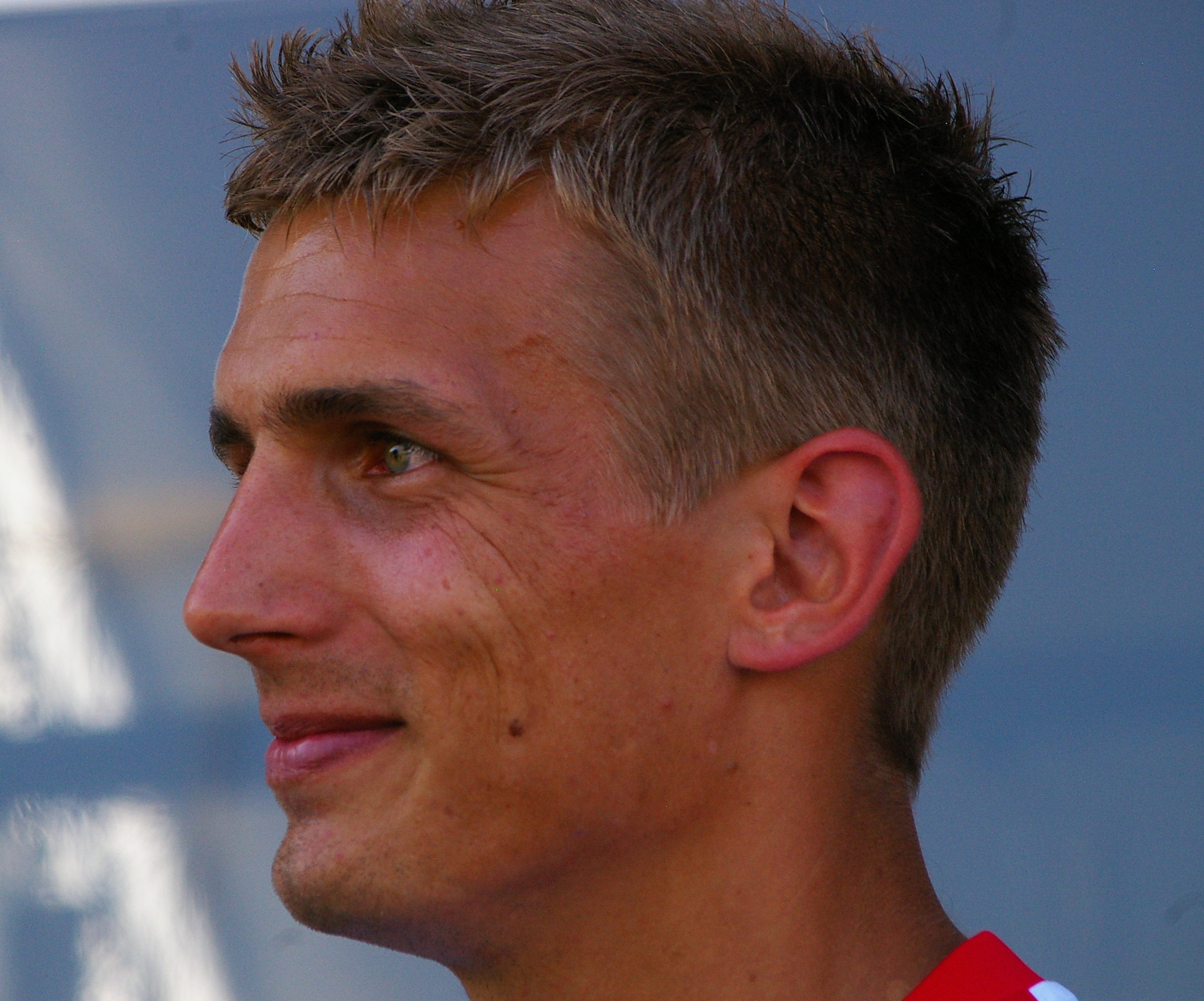
Thomas Augustinussen, 2010

=== Sport ===
- Kai Jølver (1889 in Svendborg – 1940) a modern pentathlete, competed at the 1912 Summer Olympics
- Per Rasmussen (born 1959 in Svendborg) a rower, team bronze medallist at the 1984 Summer Olympics
- Troels Bech (born 1966 in Svendborg) a former footballer with 177 caps; sports director for Brøndby IF
- Thomas Augustinussen (born 1981 in Svendborg) a retired footballer, 350 caps for AaB
- Christian Holst (born 1981 in Svendborg) a retired Danish/Faroese football player, over 340 team caps and 50 for the Faroes
