= List of castles and palaces in Denmark =

This is a consolidated list of castles and palaces in Denmark. The Danish word slot , like the word schloss in the related Germanic language— modern German— can mean either castle, a Country house or palace, in accordance with common English usage.

Whenever possible traditional English translations provided by the Danish Palaces and Properties Agency, a national agency maintaining and utilising the states palaces, castles and gardens, have been used to determine whether a property should be called a castle or a palace. When not possible the following guidelines, which are in general keeping with the above translations, and with Wikipedia articles have been used:

- Castle: Generally older building, generally a fortified building
- Palace: Generally newer building, generally a non-fortified building used primarily as a residence

== Other related words ==
The Danish word borg, which appears at the end of many castle and palace names literally means "fortified castle", but it is no clear indication that the property is indeed fortified. For example, Amalienborg is translated as Amalienborg Palace.

The Danish word palæ translates to "mansion", and is most often used as an indication of a non-royal, urban mansion. Exceptions are the four palæer (plural) at Amalienborg Palace, the four individual buildings that make up the Amalienborg Palace complex. These were originally non-royal, urban mansions, which were taken over by royalty in the late 18th century.

== List of castles and palaces ==
=== A-D ===
- Absalon's Castle - ruins
- Aldershvile Palace - ruins
- Amalienborg Palace
- Antvorskov Castle - ruins
- Arreskov Castle
- Arresødal Castle
- Asdal Castle - ruins
- Asserbo Castle - ruins
- Augustenborg Palace
- Bastruptårnet - ruins
- Berritzgaard Palace
- Bernstorff Palace and Palace Gardens
- Bispens Hald - ruins
- Boller Castle (Horsens)
- Borgvold - ruins
- Borrebjerg - ruins
- Brattingborg - ruins
- Brundlund Castle
- Borgeby Castle
- Bygholm - ruins
- Charlottenborg Palace
- Charlottenlund Palace and Palace Gardens
- Christiansborg Palace (1st)
- Christiansborg Palace (2nd)
- Christiansborg Palace
- Clausholm Castle
- Copenhagen Castle
- Dragsholm Castle
- Dronningholm Castle - ruins
- Dronninglund Castle
- Duborg Castle
- Dynæsvold - ruins

=== E-G ===
- Egelund Castle
- Egeskov Castle
- Egholm Manor
- Engelsborg - ruins
- Engelsholm Castle
- Eremitage Palace Hunting Lodge
- Eriksholm Castle
- Eriksvolde - ruins
- Fredensborg Palace and Palace Gardens
- Frederiksberg Palace, Frederiksberg Palace Gardens and Søndermarken
- Frederiksborg Palace and Castle Gardens
- Frijsenborg
- Fuglsang Manor
- Fussingø Palace
- Fyrbakken (Hjelm) - ruins
- Gamleborg (Bornholm) - ruins
- Gammel Brattingborg - ruins
- Gammel Estrup Manor
- Gammel Avernæs slot
- Gammel Vraa Castle
- Gavnø Castle
- Gisselfeld
- Gjorslev
- Glorup Manor
- Gram Castle
- Grimstrup - ruins
- Gyldensteen slot
- Gråsten Palace and Palace Gardens
- Gråsten Skanse (Ærø) - ruins
- Guldborg Banke - ruins
- Gurre Castle - ruins

=== H-K ===
- Haderslevhus Castle
- Hagenskov Castle
- Hagsholm - ruins
- Hald castle - ruins
- Hammershus Castle - ruins
- Haraldsborg - ruins
- Harritslevgård
- Hesselagergård Manor
- Hindsgavl Castle
- Hirschholm Palace - historic
- Holbæk Castle - ruins
- Holckenhavn Castle
- Holsteinborg Castle
- Hvedholm Castle
- Hvidkilde Castle
- Hvidøre
- Højriis Castle
- Hønborg - ruins
- Jungshoved - ruins
- Jægerspris Castle
- Kalø Castle - ruins
- Kalundborg Castle
- Klintholm slot
- Knabstrup Manor
- Kokkedal Castle (Zealand)
- Kokkedal Castle (Jutland)
- Koldinghus Castle
- Kongstedlund
- Korsør Castle
- Krengerup Manor
- Kronborg Castle
- Kærstrup

=== L-S ===
- Langesø Castle
- Ledreborg Palace
- Lerchenborg
- Lilleborg, Bornholm - ruins
- Liselund old Castle
- Liselund Palace
- Lykkesholm Castle
- Malling Church - ruins
- Marienlyst Palace
- Marselisborg Palace
- Meilgaard Castle
- Nebbe Voldsted - ruins
- Niels Bugges Hald - ruins
- Nordborg Castle
- Nyborg Castle
- Nykøbing Castle
- Nysø Manor
- Næsbyhoved - ruins
- Næsholm - ruins
- Næsseslottet
- Nørlund slot
- Nørre Vosborg
- Nørreris Castle - ruins
- Nørtorp - ruins
- Odense Castle
- Pederstrup
- Rane Ladegård - ruins
- Ravnsborg - ruins
- Refshale Castle - ruins
- Riberhus - ruins
- Rønninge Søgård
- Rosenborg Castle and Castle Gardens
- Rosenholm Castle
- Roskilde Palace
- Saint Albert Castle - ruins
- Sandbjerg Estate
- Schackenborg Castle
- Selsø
- Silkeborg slot
- Skanderborg Palace
- Skjoldnæsholm - manor
- Skovgård Castle - ruins
- Skrøbelev Gods
- Sophienberg Palace and Palace Gardens
- Sorgenfri Palace
- Sorø Abbey
- Sostrup Castle
- Sprogø - ruins
- Spøttrup Castle
- Søborg Castle - ruins
- Søby Volde - ruins
- Søllerød Slot
- Sønderborg Castle

=== T-Å ===
- Tirsbæk Palace
- Tranekær Castle
- Tønderhus - historic
- Tårnborg Castle - ruins near Korsør
- Tårupgård Castle
- Ulstrup Castle
- Valgestrup - ruins
- Valdemars Castle
- Vallø Castle
- Vardehus - ruins
- Vesborg Castle - ruin
- Voergård Castle
- Vordingborg Castle
- Yellow Palace
- Ørkild Castle - ruins
- Aalborghus Castle
- Ålevad - ruins
- Aalholm Castle

== See also ==
- List of Danish royal residences
- List of historic houses in Denmark
- List of historic houses in metropolitan Copenhagen
