= Jens Ingwersen =

Danish architect (1871–1956)

Jens Ingwersen (17 August 1871 – 10 October 1956) was a Danish architect during the transition from neoclassicism to functionalism. He was the architect of the telephone company KTAS and is the man behind most of this company's buildings.

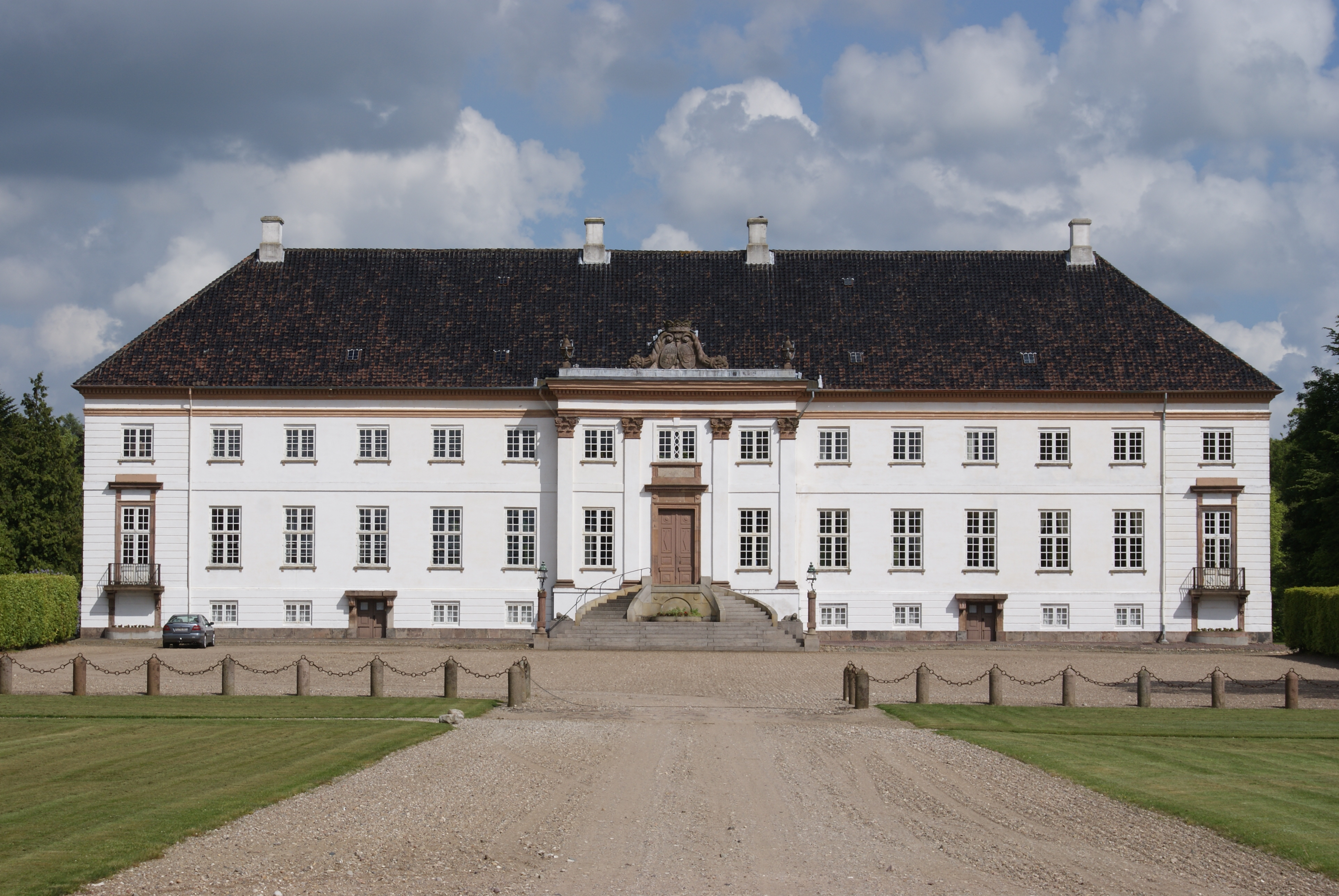
Krengerup Manor. Restored by Jens Christian Rantzau with the assistance of Jens Ingwersen (1917)

== Biography ==
Ingwersen was born at Aggersbøl in Vejle County, Denmark. He began his education at the Copenhagen Technical College, from which he left in 1895. In the same year, he was admitted to the Royal Danish Academy of Fine Arts. He worked for various architectural and design firms, including Vilhelm Dahlerup in 1893–94, Gotfred Tvede in 1894–96, Fritz Koch in 1896–1905, and at times at Caspar Leuning Borch. Ingwersen graduated from the Danish Art Academy in 1906. He established an independent architectural firm in Copenhagen in 1905, with Jørgen V. Jepsen as a partner from 1919. He often appeared at the Charlottenborg Spring Exhibition. In 1917, he assisted Jens Christian Rantzau in a renovation of Krengerup manor on Funen. He was later made a Knight of the Dannebrog for his services to Danish architecture.
