= Antonigade 9 =

Residential building in Copenhagen, Denmark

Antonigade 0
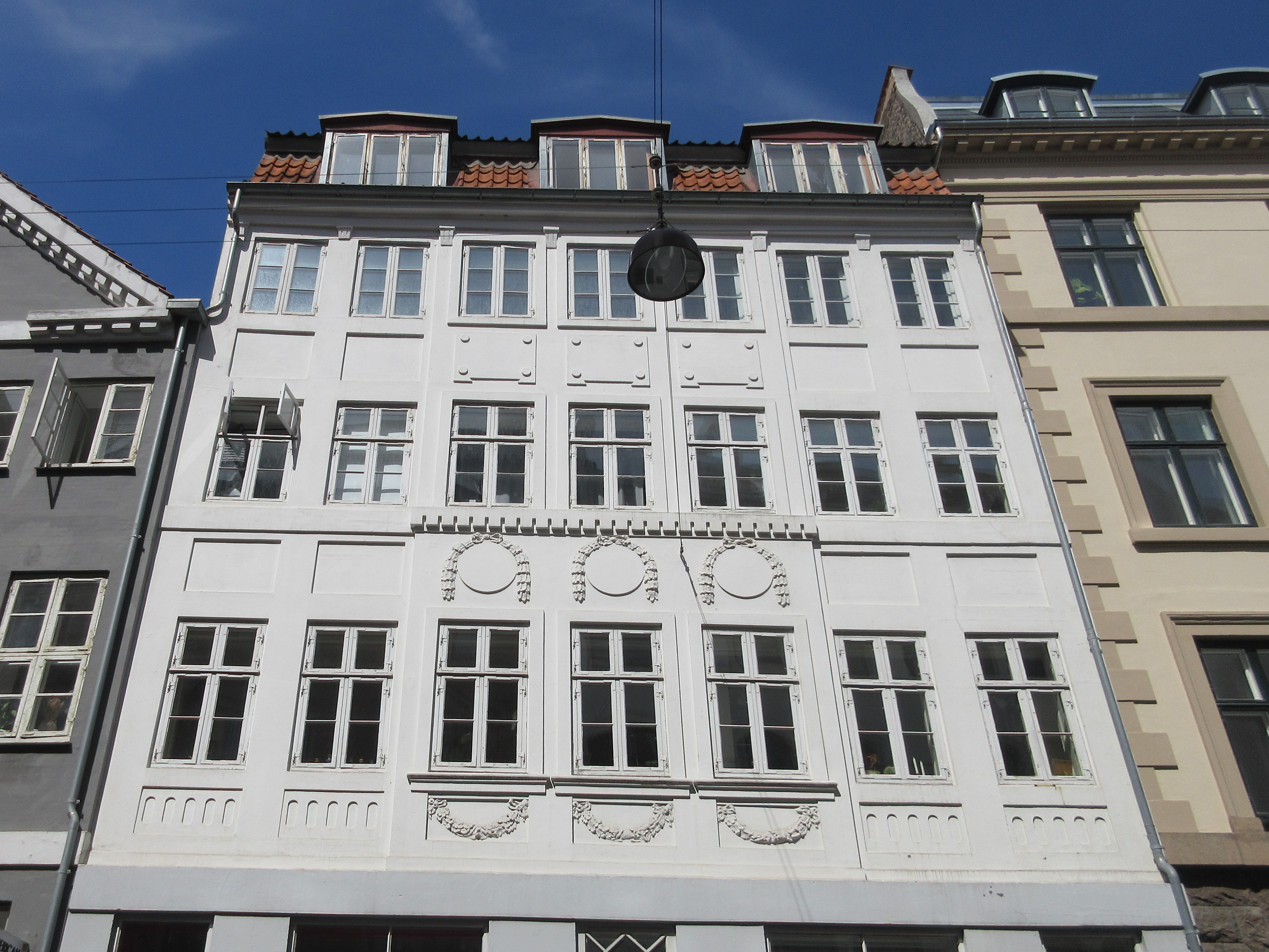
- Interactive map of the Antonigade 0 area

General information
- Location: Copenhagen, Denmark
- Coordinates: 55°40′49.62″N 12°34′52.57″E
- Completed: 1766

Design and construction
- Architect: Hans Næss

Antonigade 9 is a late-18th-century residential building situated in the Old Town of Copenhagen, Denmark. It was constructed in 1766 to designs by architect Hans Næss, who was himself among the residents until his death almost thirty years later. The building was Danish registry of protected buildings and places in 1918. The scope of the heritage listing was expanded in 2000. Other notable former residents include Urban Bruun Aaskov, court bookdealer and publisher Simon Peter Poulsen, and theologian Otto Horrebow.

== History ==
=== 17th century ===
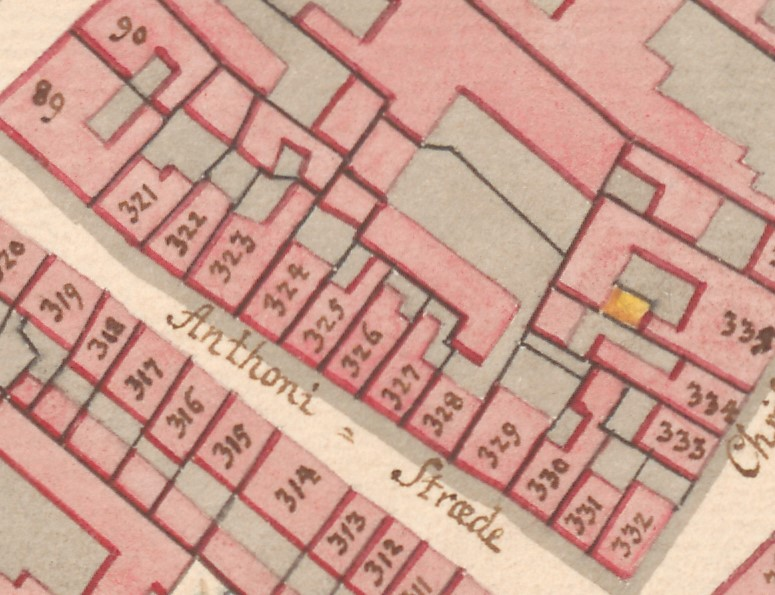
No. 324 and No. 325 seen on a detail from Christian Gedde's map of St. Ann's West Quarter, 1757

The site was formerly part of two properties, listed in Copenhagen's first cadastre of 1689 as No. 262 and No. 263 in Købmager Quarter. The two properties were listed in the new cadastre of 1756 as No. 324 and No. 325 in Købmager Quarter and were both owned by shoemaker Johan Jacob Elvig at that time.

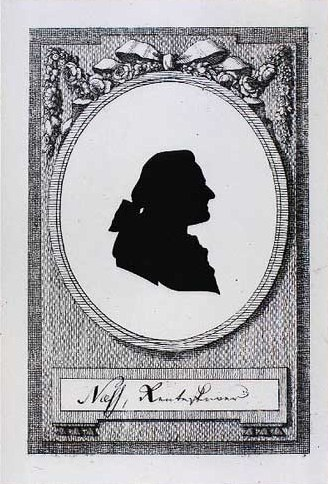
Hans Pedersen Næss

The two small properties were acquired by architect Hans Næss and master carpenter Jens Suhr in 1765. The present building on the site was constructed to designs by Nøss in 1766. With its four-floor and stucco decorations, it stoof out from the low, half-timbered houses that dominated the rest of the street, making it colloquially known as "The Castle" )Danish: Slottet) among the other residents of the neighborhood. Næss resided in the building until his death in 1795.

The physician Urban Bruun Aaskov (1742-1806) was among the residents of the building in 1774. He worked as phtsician for the Royal Danish Navy (Admiralitæts-Medicus) at that time.

=== Simon Peter Poulsen ===
The property was at some point acquired by the bookdealer and publisher Simon Peter Poulsen (1767-1823). Ge was licensed as a bookdealer in 1786 and appointed as court bookdealer in 1791. His publications included the weekly Morgen'Posten (1786–1798, then continued by Odin Wolf until 1829), Nytårsgaver for Dammer (1682–1807) and the literary magazine Iris (1681–1795) Johan Clemens Tode). Poulsen's property was listed in the new cadastre of 1806 as No. 237.

The theologian Otto Horrebow (1769-1823) resided in one of the apartments from 1814 but he moved again after around one year.

=== 1845 ===
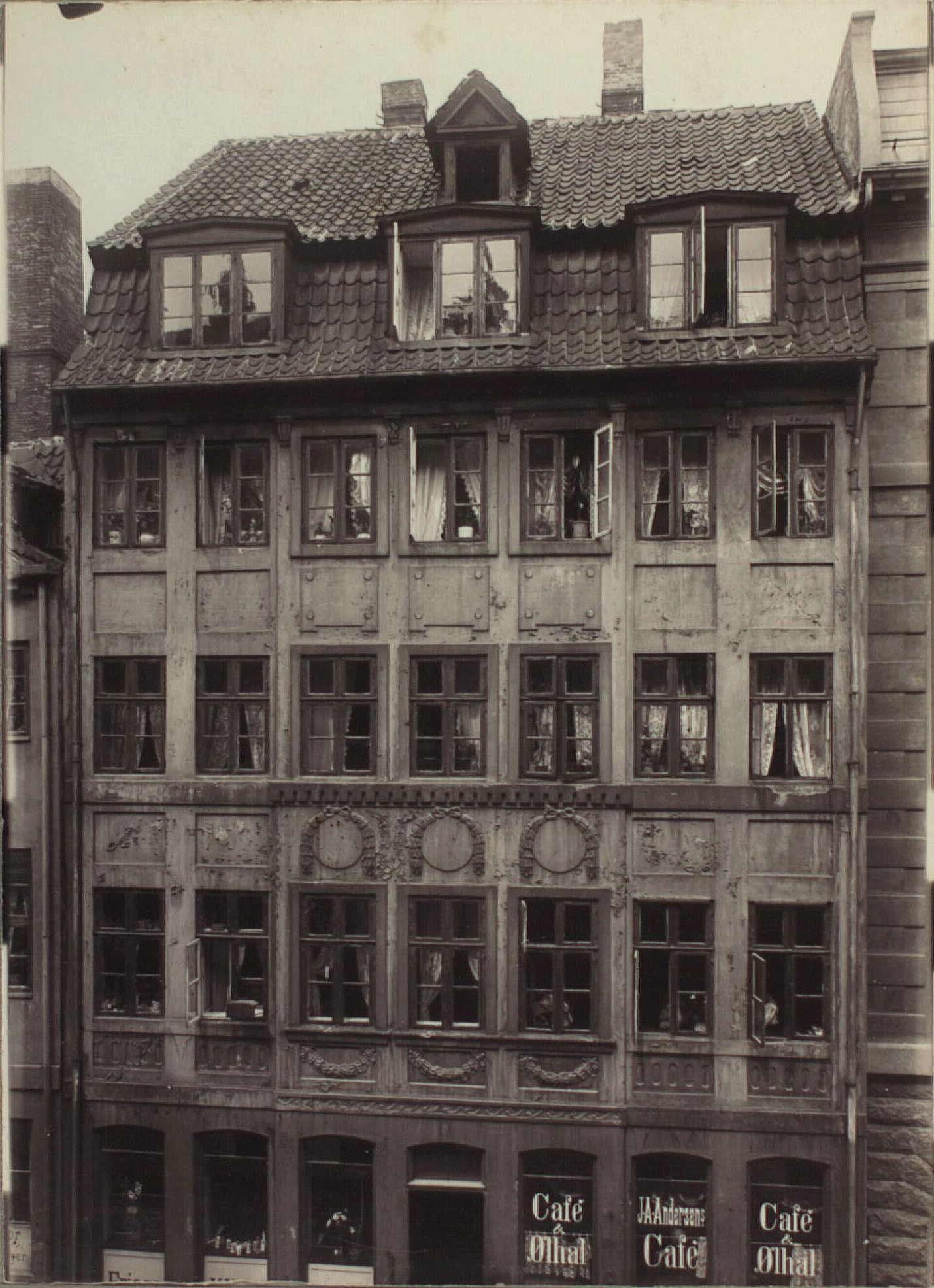
Antonigade 9

The property was home to 57 residents at the time of the 1845 census. Johann Jungdahl, a shoemaker, resided on the ground floor to the left with his wife Cathrine Marie Wismann, their six children (aged six to 17) and one shoemaker (employee). Christian Gottlieb Hendrichsen, a barber, resided on the ground floor to the right with his housekeeper Anne Birgitte Dithmer. Peter Martins, a master turner, resided on the first floor to the left with his wife Emilie Rasmine Martins (née Paulsen), their four children (aged two to 10), two turners (employees), four turner's apprentices and one maid. Mathies Conrad Schibler. a carpenter, resided on the first floor to the right with his wife Marie Christine Schibler (née Bjørst)m their 10-year-old daughter Caroline Frederikke Schibler and 21-year-old Giertrud Christine Maagensen. Jacob Johansen, a workman, resided on the second floor with his wife Sophie Christiane Johansen (née Lauenborg). Tobi Meyer, a tailor, resided on the second floor to the right with three lodgers. Cornelius Sørensen. a joiner, resided on the third floor to the left with his wife Gertrud Marie f. Pettersen, their two sons (aged 11 and 14) and two lodgers (a koiner's apprentice and a tailor). James Gowans, a tanner, resided on the third floor to the right with his wife Christiane Ahrnsen Gowans, two unmarried children (aged 31 and 33) and two lodgers. Peter Petersen, a grocer (høker), resided in the basement to the left with his wife Ane Elisabeth Petersen (née Piil), their 16-year-old son Hans Peter Petersen and one maid. Hans Hansen, a workman, resided in the basement to the right with his wife Abelone Hansen f. Olsen, Karl August Baumsiker, a mason's apprentice and three other workmen.

=== 20th century ===
The building was listed on the Danish registry of protected buildings and places in 1918. The owner of the building was non the less interested in demolishing the building in 1935.

== Architecture ==
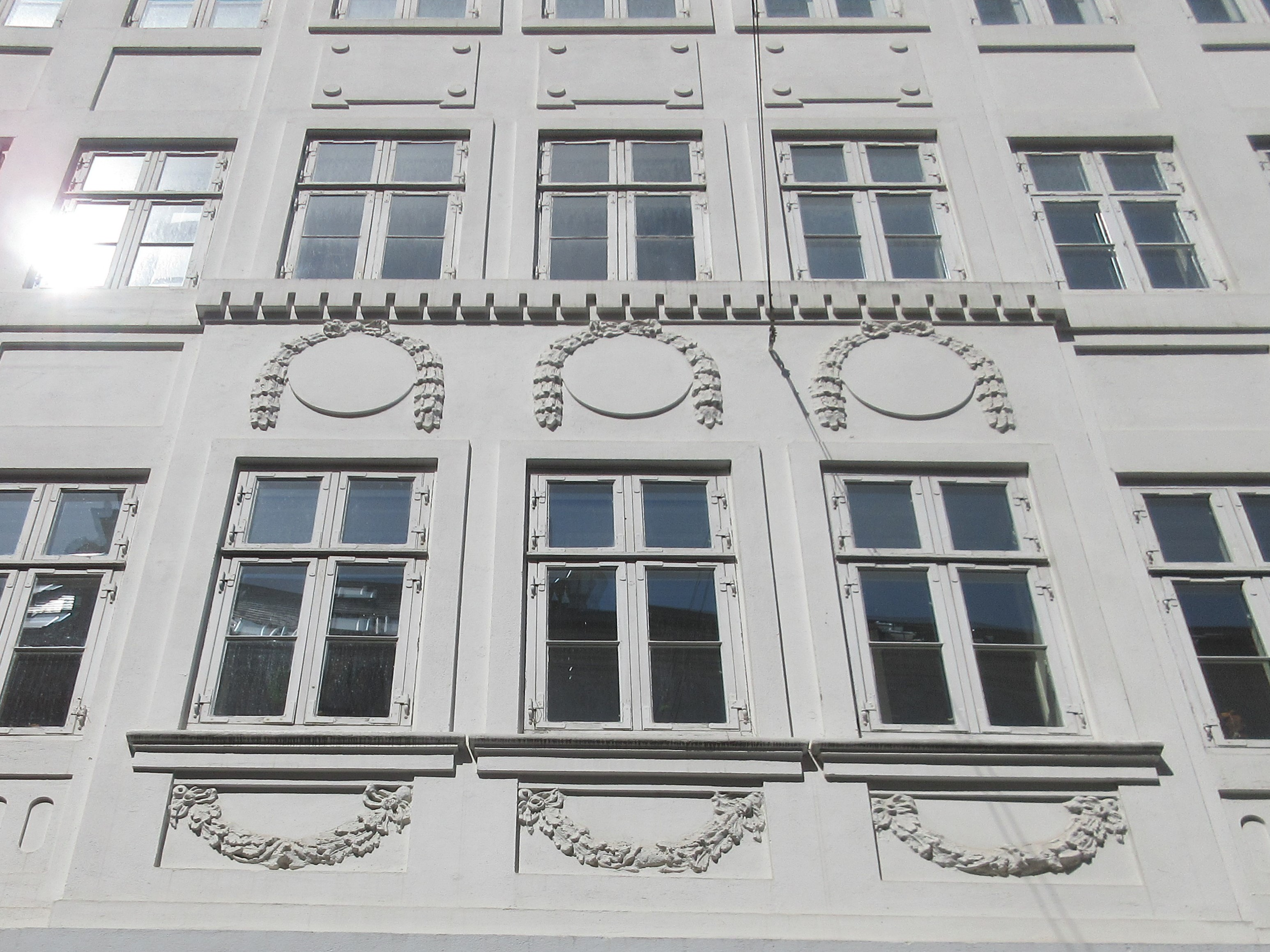
A close-up of the upper part of the median risalit

Antonigade 9 is a four-winged complex constructed in brick with four storeys above a walk-out basement. The three central bays of the seven bays wide facade form a slightly projecting median risalit. The facade is plasered and grey-painted on the ground floor and the exposed part of the basement, and white-painted on its upper part. The upper part of the median risalit is decorated with stucco festoons below the first-floor windows, medallions with garlands below the second-floor windows, and projecting rectangles with "nail reliefs" in the corners below the third-floor windows. The second-floor windows of the median risalit are accented with a heacy dentillated sill course. Its first-floor windows are accented with projecting sills. The lateral sections of the facade are decorated with tall, arched niches below the first floor windows, mimicking balustrades, and slightly depressed rectangles below the windows of the two upper floors.The cornice is supported by eight triglyphic corbels. The building's main entrance is located in the centre of the facade. The basement entrances are located in the two outer bays. The Mansard roof features three dormer windows towards the street.

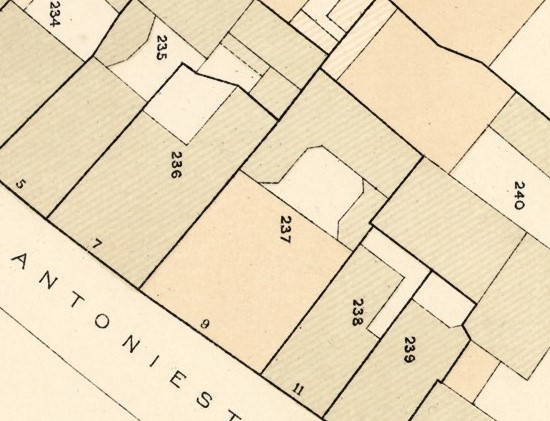
The property seen on a detail from one of Berggreen's block plans of Købmager Quarter, 1886-88

Two two-bays-log side wings with monopitched roofs projects from the rear side of the front wing along each their side of a central courtyard. They are attached to the front wing via two inwardly diagonal bays attached to the front wing, a solution selected to allow as many windows on the resr side of the front wing as possible. The two side wings are again attached to the rear wing via two canted corner bays. All the facades facing the courtyard are plastered and yellow-painted.

The western side wing and the rear side of the rear wing are constructed with timber framing. Most of the timber was renewed in conjunction with a renovation undertaken by Elkjær Arkitekter.

== Today ==
The building is now owned by Jeudan. Its two lower floors are used as office space and its two upper floors as residential apartments.

== See also ==
- Gyldendal House
