= Hans Næss (architect) =

Danish neoclassical architect

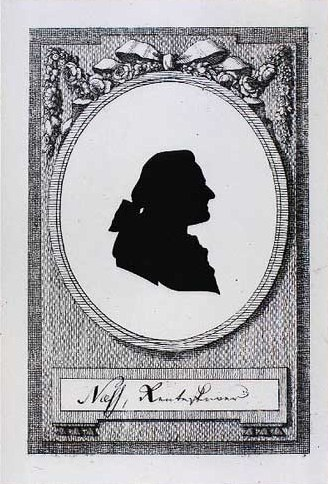
Hans Pedersen Næss

Hans Pedersen Næss (October 1723 – 3 January 1795) was a Danish architect. He was one of a generation of Neoclassical architects educated under Nicolas-Henri Jardin and Caspar Frederik Harsdorff; he mainly designed manor houses.

== Biography ==
His exact date of birth remains unknown, but Hans Næss was born the son of a farmer at Næs on the island of Funen near Assens, Denmark. He was baptized on 24 October 1723. He worked as a notary at the Brahesborg estate and then for three years as a local functionary at Assens Town Hall before travelling to Copenhagen, where he attended the Royal Danish Academy of Fine Arts. There he studied under Nicolas-Henri Jardin and won the large silver medal in 1758, the small gold medal in 1760 and 1762, and then finally, the large gold medal in 1763.

After completing his education, he taught geometry and perspective at the Academy of Arts from 1765 to 1782 and worked for Harsdorff. From 1781 to 1782 he served as architect at the royal chapels in Copenhagen and North Zealand and then as head of the new Building Office until 1793.

== Selected works ==
- Lihme House (Lihmes Gård), Kongens Nytorv 18, Copenhagen (1768 by attribution, listed)
- Antonigade 9, Copenhagen (1766 and co-owned by Næs until 1770; listed)
- Hallings Gård, 14 Lille Strandstræde, Copenhagen (c. 1775 by attribution, alterations, listed)
- Krengerup Manor (Krengerup Gods), Funen (c. 1772–1776, listed)
- Kragsberg, Funen (c. 1776, listed)
- Hindsgavl Castle (Hindsgavl Slot), Funen (1784, listed)
- Langesø Manor House (Langesø Gods), Funen (exit gate 1774)

== Gallery ==
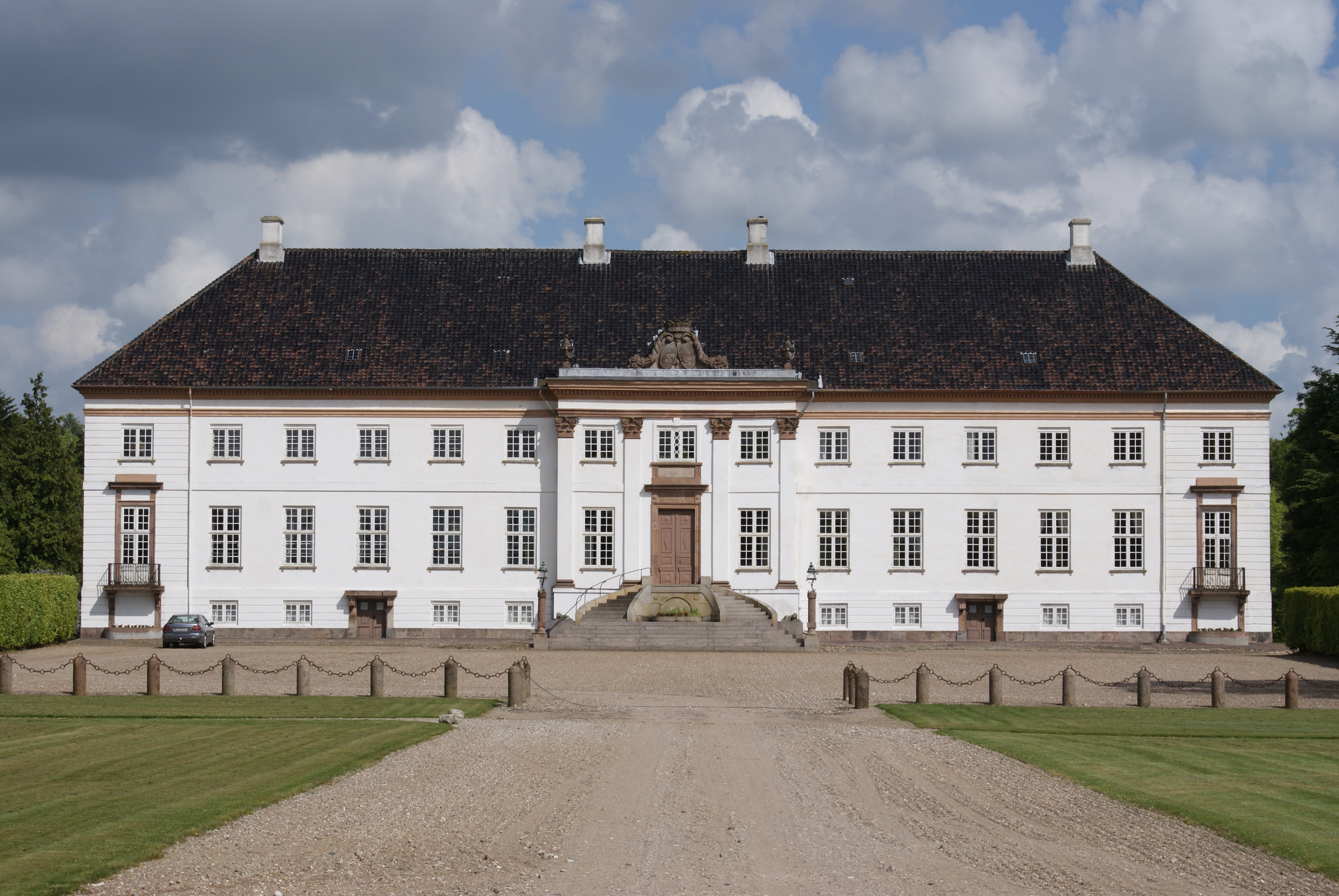
Krengerup Manor, Funen (c. 1772–1776)

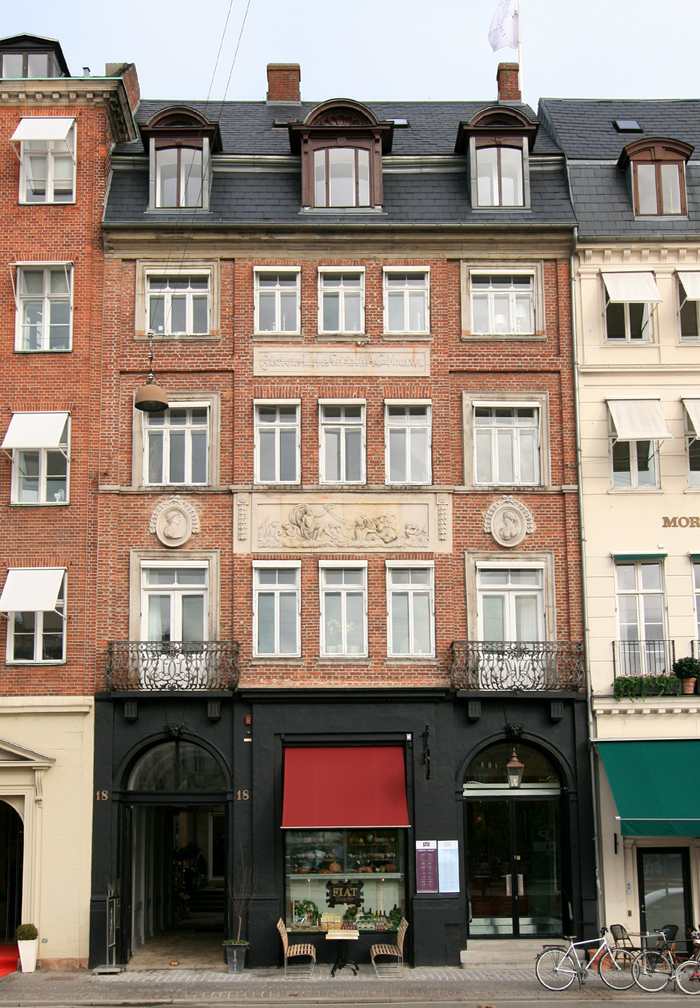
Lihme House, 18 Kongens Nytorv, Copenhagen (1768)

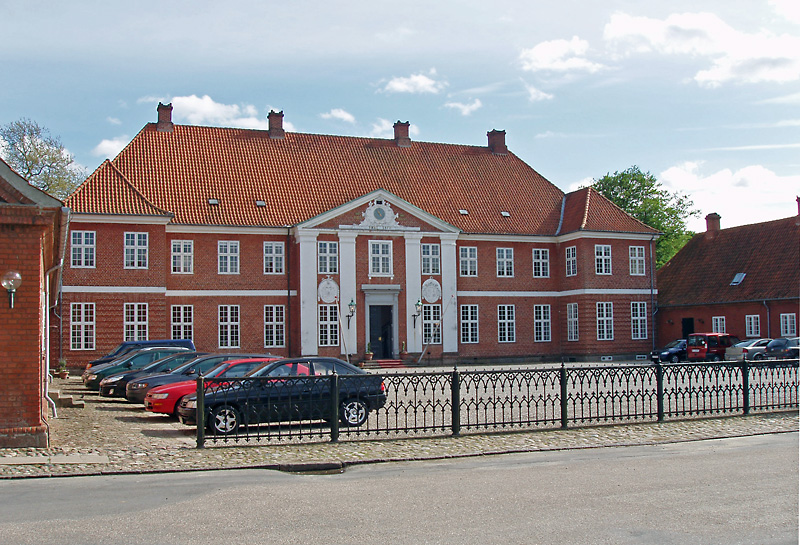
Hindsgavl Castle, Funen (1784)
