= Princess Dagmar of Denmark =

Danish princess (1890–1961)

Princess Dagmar
- Mrs. Castenskjold
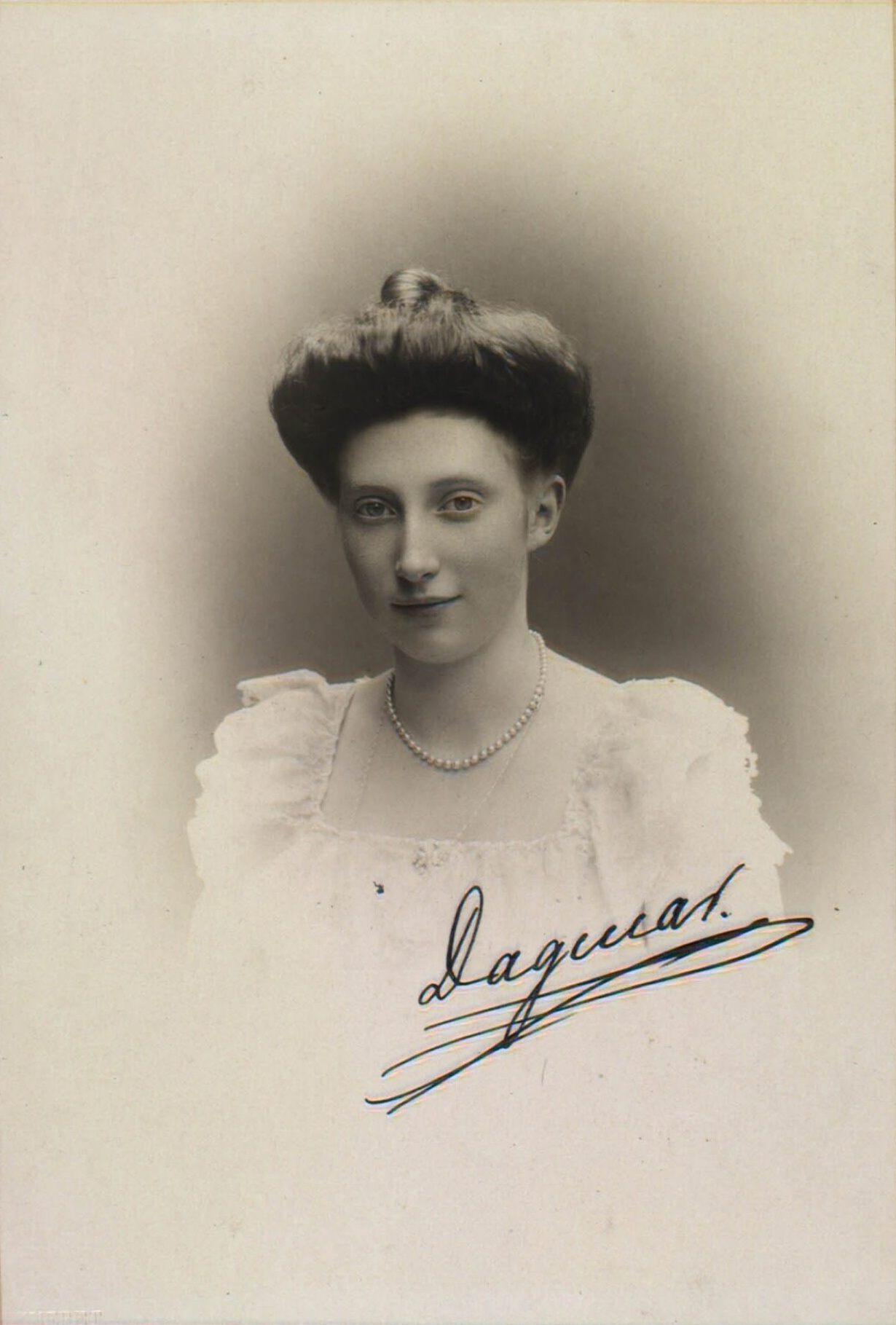
- Dagmar in 1910
- Born: 23 May 1890; Charlottenlund Palace, Copenhagen, Denmark
- Died: 11 October 1961 (aged 71); Kongstedlund, Denmark
- Spouse: Jørgen Castenskjold (m. 1922)
- Issue: Carl Castenskjold; Christian Castenskjold; Jørgen Castenskjold; Dagmar Larsen; Christian Frederik Castenskjold
Names
- Dagmar Louise Elisabeth
- House: Glücksburg
- Father: Frederick VIII of Denmark
- Mother: Lovisa of Sweden

Princess Dagmar of Denmark (Dagmar Louise Elisabeth; 23 May 1890 – 11 October 1961) was a member of the Danish royal family. She was the youngest child and fourth daughter of Frederick VIII of Denmark and his wife, Princess Louise of Sweden and Norway.

== Early life ==
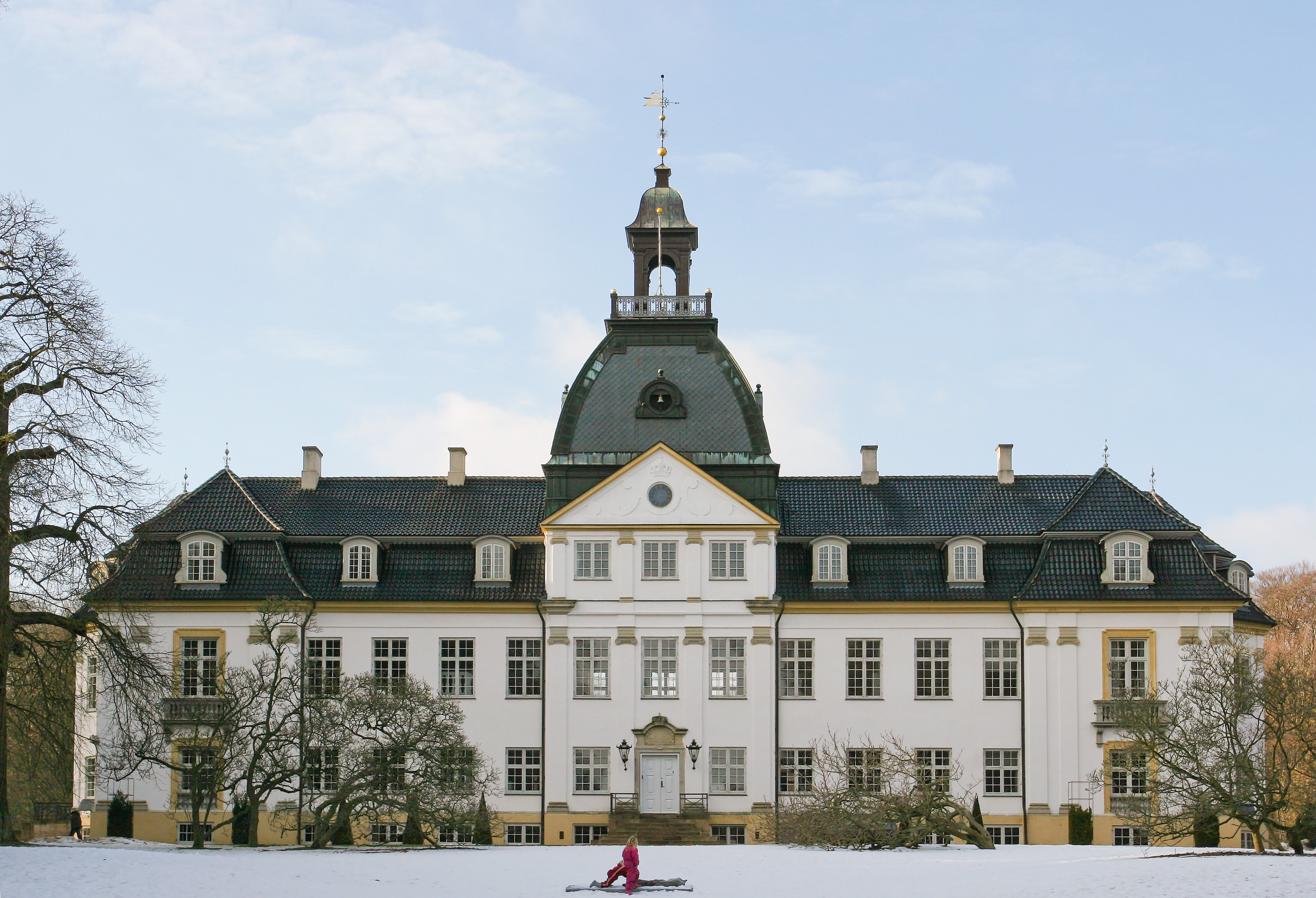
Princess Dagmar's birthplace, Charlottenlund Palace, photographed in 2006

Princess Dagmar was born on 23 May 1890 at her parents' country residence, the Charlottenlund Palace north of Copenhagen, during the reign of her paternal grandfather, King Christian IX. She was the eighth and youngest child and fourth daughter of Crown Prince Frederick of Denmark and his wife Louise of Sweden. Her father was the eldest son of King Christian IX of Denmark and Louise of Hesse-Kassel, and her mother was the only daughter of King Charles XV of Sweden and Norway and Louise of the Netherlands. She was baptised with the names Dagmar Louise Elisabeth and was known as Princess Dagmar, named after her paternal aunt, Empress Maria Feodorovna of Russia, who was born Princess Dagmar of Denmark.

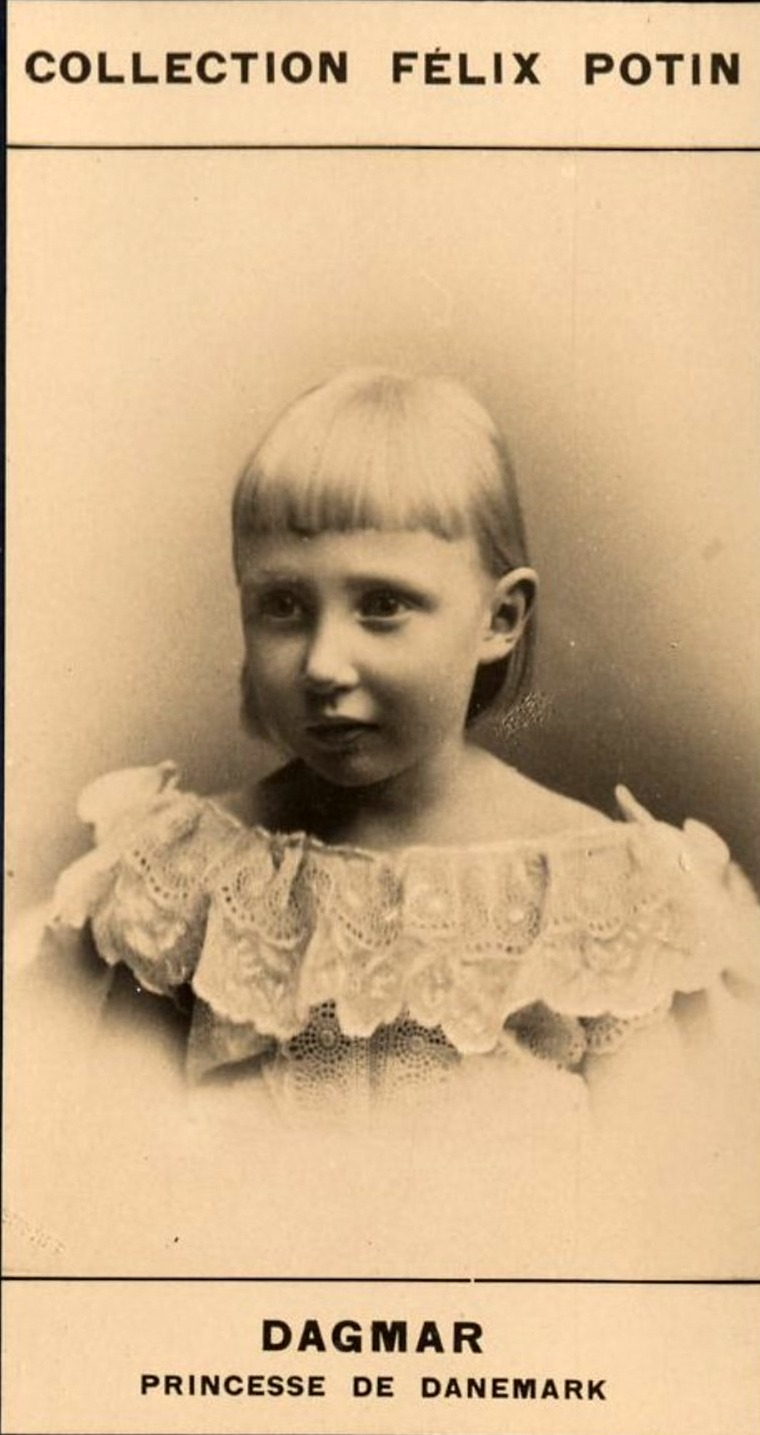
Princess Dagmar as child.

Princess Dagmar was raised with her siblings in the royal household in Copenhagen, and grew up between her parents' city residence, the Frederick VIII's Palace, an 18th-century palace which forms part of the Amalienborg Palace complex in central Copenhagen, and their country residence, the Charlottenlund Palace, located by the coastline of the Øresund strait north of the city.

== Marriage and descendants ==
She was married in Fredensborg, Denmark, on 23 November 1922 to Jørgen Castenskjold (Copenhagen, 30 November 1893 – Rungsted, 21 November 1978), son of Anton Castenskiold (1860–1940), Royal Danish Court Chamberlain, and wife Sophie Steensen-Leth (1870–1947), both belonging to Danish Nobility. They had five children, four sons and one daughter, who was named after her mother:

- Carl Frederik Anton Jørgen Castenskjold (Kongstedlund, Denmark: 13 November 1923 – 14 April 2006) ⚭ 1) Bente Grevenkop-Castenskiold (b. 1948), had issue; ⚭ 2) Else Albrechtsen (b. 1933), no issue; ⚭ Maja Tegner (1919–2003), no issue
- Christian Ludwig Gustav Fritz Castenskiold (Kongstedlund, Denmark: 10 July 1926 – 16 July 2024) ⚭ Cecily Abbots (1927–2019); had issue
- Jørgen Frederik Aage Erik Helge Castenskjold (Kongstedlund, Denmark, 16 March 1928 – Næstved, 4 May 1964) ⚭ 1) Kirsten Schlichtkrull (b. 1934); had issue ⚭ 2) Birgit Tengstedt (b. 1932); had issue
- Dagmar Louise Thyra Sophie Augusta Petra Castenskjold (Kongstedlund, 11 September 1930 – Solrød, 12 July 2013) ⚭ 1) Poul Bitsch (1930–1967); had issue ⚭ 2) Ole Friis Larsen (b. 1948); no issue
- Christian Frederik Castenskjold (Kongstedlund, 21 August 1931 – Kongstedlund, 4 November 1937), died as a child

== Death ==
Princess Dagmar died on 11 October 1961 at Kongstedlund, Denmark, at the age of 71, as the last surviving child of King Frederick VIII and Queen Louise.
