= Ørkild Castle =

Motte from the middle ages, located in Denmark

Coordinates: 55.0673°N 10.6234°E

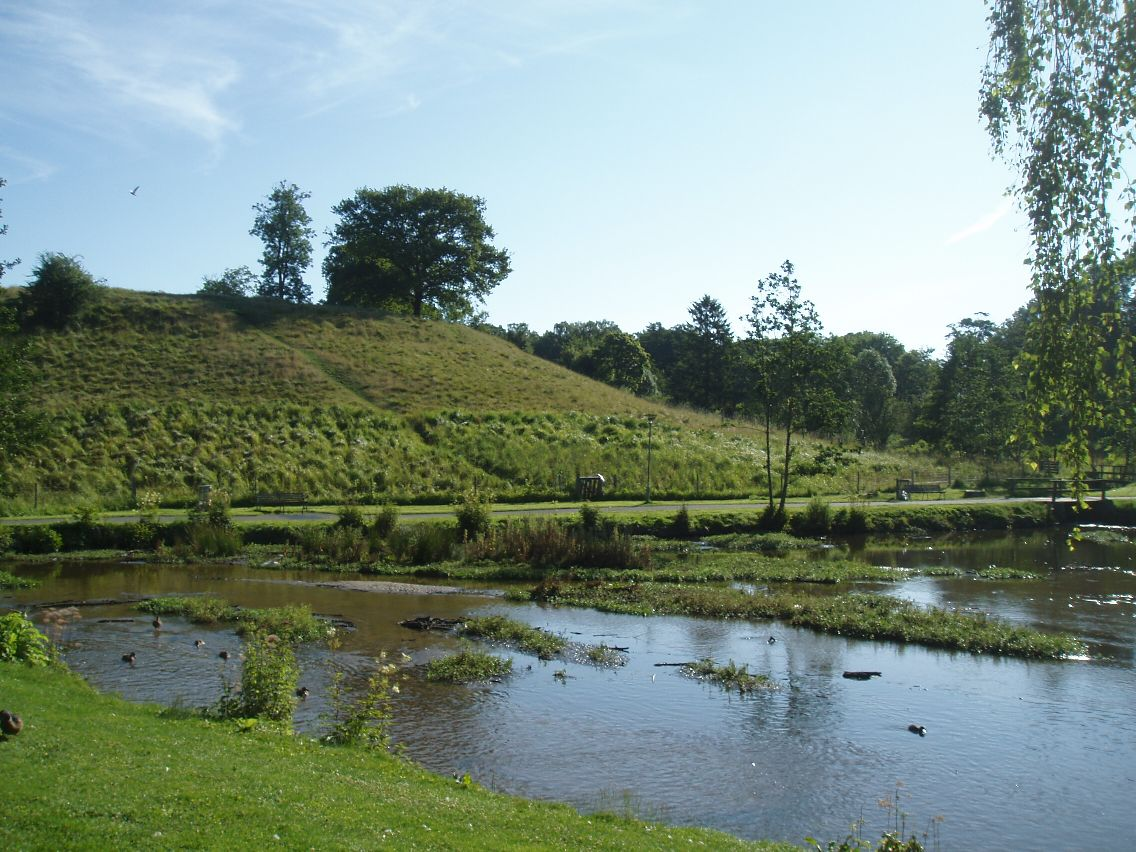
Part of the motte at Ørkild Castle as it appears today.

Ørkild Castle or Ørkilde is a former medieval castle and current motte located in Svendborg on Funen island in Denmark. It is among the large mottes from the Middle Ages, and one of the largest mottes in the country.

Ørkild Castle was built as a wooden fortress in the 1200s and was later improved, owned by the Bishopric of Odense multiple times. It was under royal ownership after Valdemar Atterdag annexed the castle in the 1350s and for about 50 years thereafter. The bishops of Odense owned it until 1534 when it was destroyed during the Count's Feud. Today, only a small foundation and the large motte remain.

== History ==
The fortress was built sometime in the 1200s, possibly with Valdemar Sejr as the builder. It is first mentioned in 1264 and has been owned by the Bishopric of Odense during several periods. In the 1350s, Valdemar Atterdag confiscated the castle, and the crown owned it until around the year 1400. Afterwards, the Bishop of Odense had ownership several times.

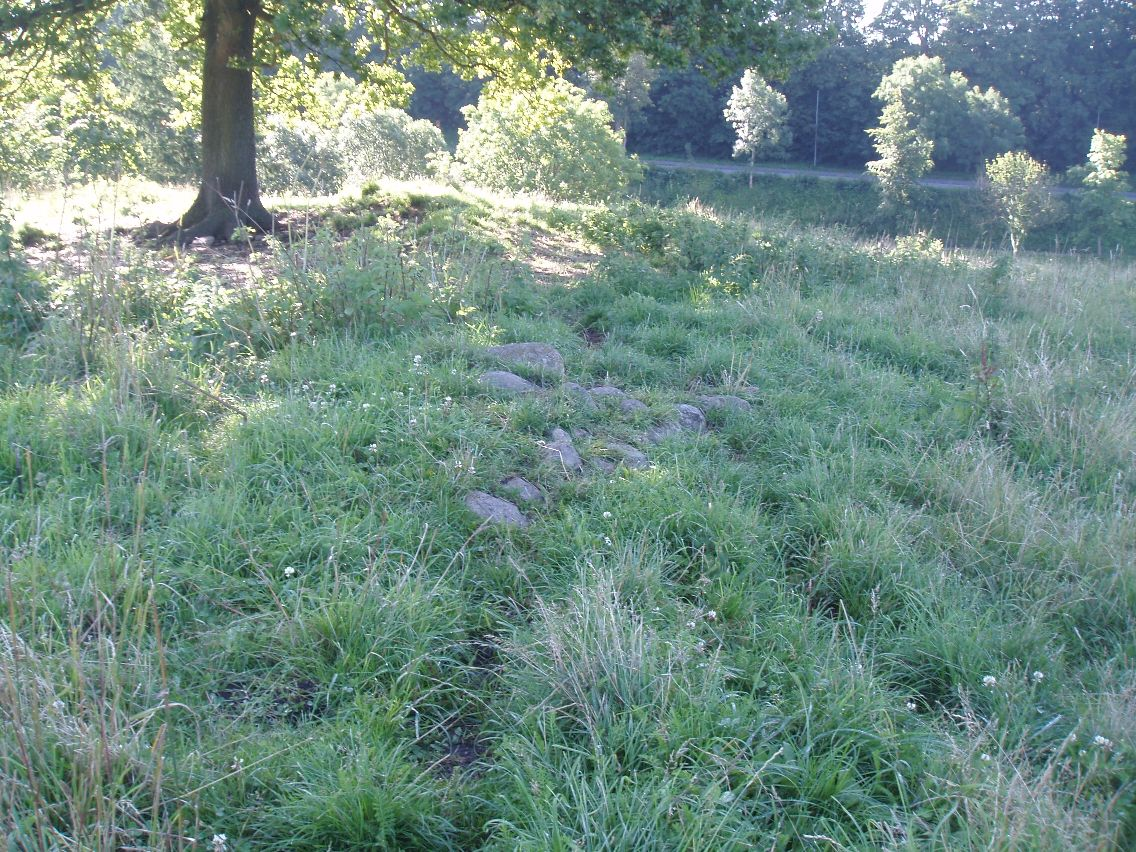
Remains of the foundation.

In 1534, during the Count's Feud, Count Christopher of Oldenburg led the rebellious citizens from Svendborg against the castle, which was at that time owned by the Bishop of Odense and used as the bishopric's fortress. Several local council members supported the rebels, who eventually captured and burned the castle down, as the town's inhabitants supported Christian II, believing the castle negatively impacted the town's economy through illegal trade and navigation. After the castle was taken, the rebels proceeded to Odense, where they plundered the bishop's residence. The group was ultimately defeated by Johan Rantzau at the Battle of Øksnebjerg in 1535.

The stones were subsequently used in other constructions in the area, and today only sporadic remnants of the foundation are preserved.

In 1951, the area was protected. Despite this, the municipality still leased the land during the 1950s and 1960s, where a number of allotment gardens were built. The Nature Complaints Board decided in 1998 that these should be removed by the end of 2005, and today the area is just laid out as grass, allowing the motte to be clearly seen.

== Description ==
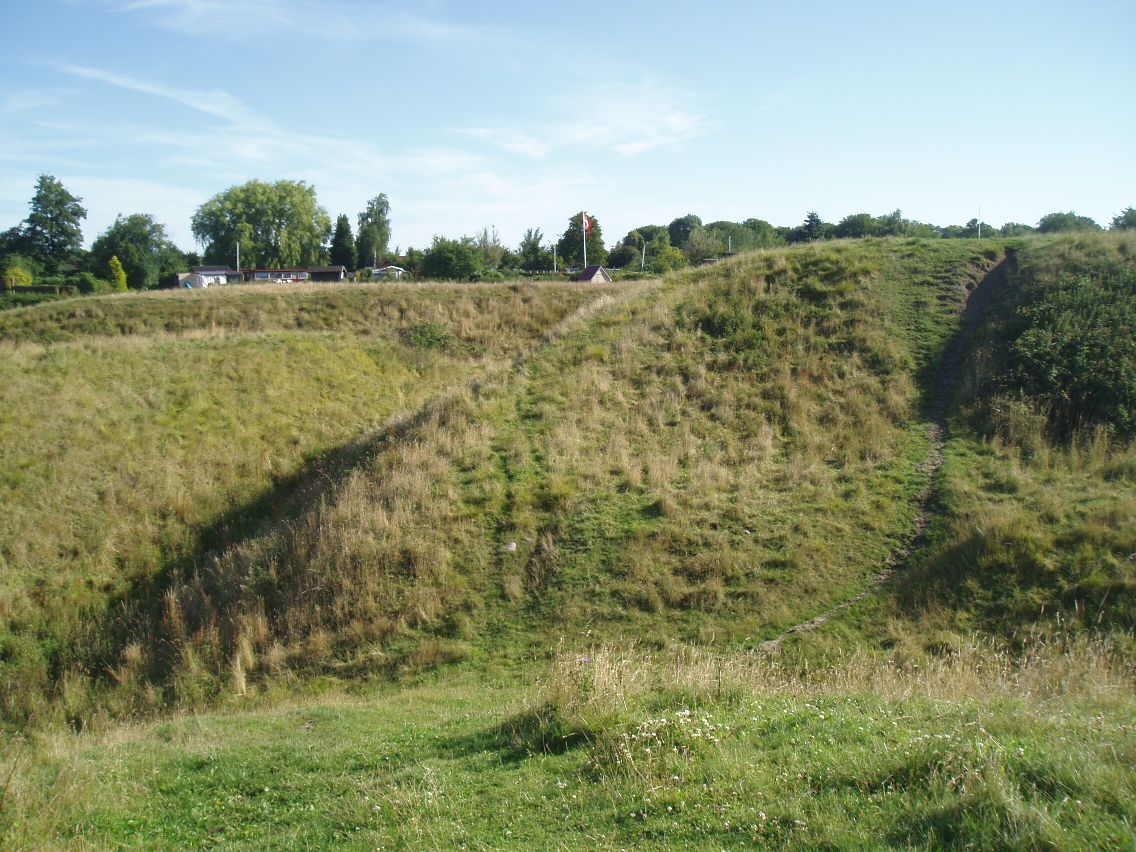
One of the dry moats

Ørkild Castle is located on a hill that stretches in a gentle arc around the town. The motte itself measures 75x75 meters. To the north is a moat that separates the main castle from an outer bailey. In front of this are two dry moats with a rampart in between. Initially, the castle was built of wood but was later rebuilt in bricks.

The entire area encompasses about 25,000 m^{2}.
