= Lihme House =

Danish landmark

- Lihmes Gård
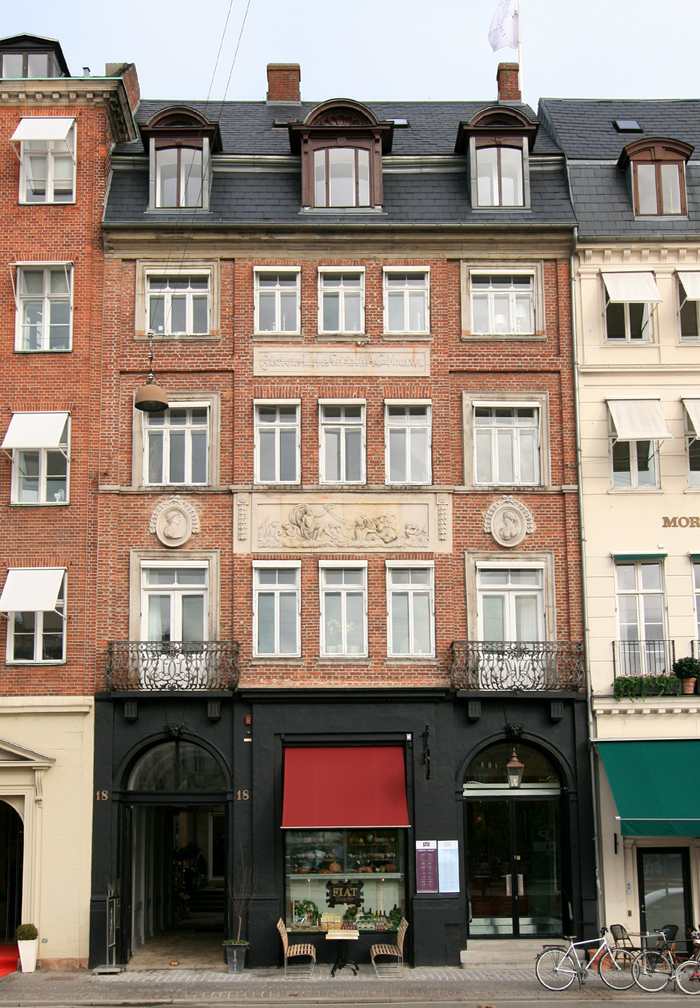
- Interactive map of the Lihme House area

General information
- Location: Copenhagen, Denmark
- Coordinates: 55°40′42.49″N 12°34′51.52″E
- Completed: 1768
- Client: Christian Rasmussen Lihme

Design and construction
- Architect: Hans Næss

The Lihme House (Danish: Lihmes Gård) is a Neoclassical property located at Kongens Nytorv 18 in central Copenhagen, Denmark. Restaurant Feist is located in the ground floor of the building while the IT consultancy Nine occupies the upper floors. The building was listed on the Danish registry of protected buildings and places in 1918 but delisted on 20 September 2016.

== History ==
The building was constructed in 1768 for Akvavit-distiller Christian Rasmussen Lihme. It is believed that the architect was Hans Næss (1723–1795). The actor Adolph Rosenkilde was between 1852 and 1860 one of the residents in the building. He was from 1856 associated with the Royal Danish Theatre on the other side of the square. The composer Peter Heise lived in the building in 1866–67.

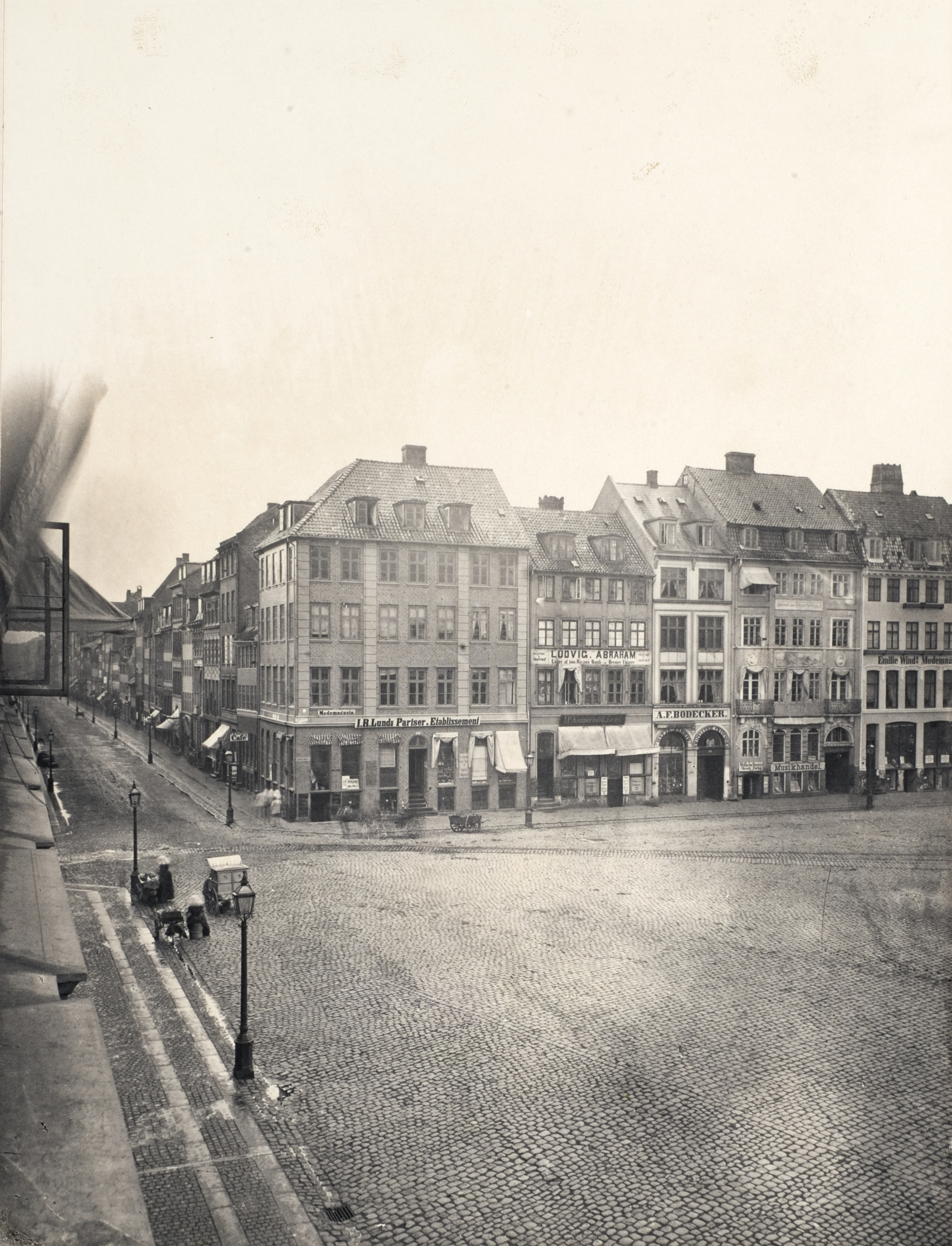
The building seen to the right with Wilhelm Hansen's Music Publishing Firm in the basement.ch

The building was listed on the Danish registry of protected buildings and places on 23 December 1918 but delisted on 20 September 2016.

== Architecture ==
The four-storey building is designed in the Neoclassical style. It is five bays wide and has a three-bay median risalit decorated with a relief depicting Poseidon between the second and third floor.

== Today ==
Restaurant Fiat is based in the ground floor of the building. The IT consultancy Nine occupies the upper floors.
