= Crossing attempt to Funen =

Part of the Torstenson War

- Part of the Torstenson War
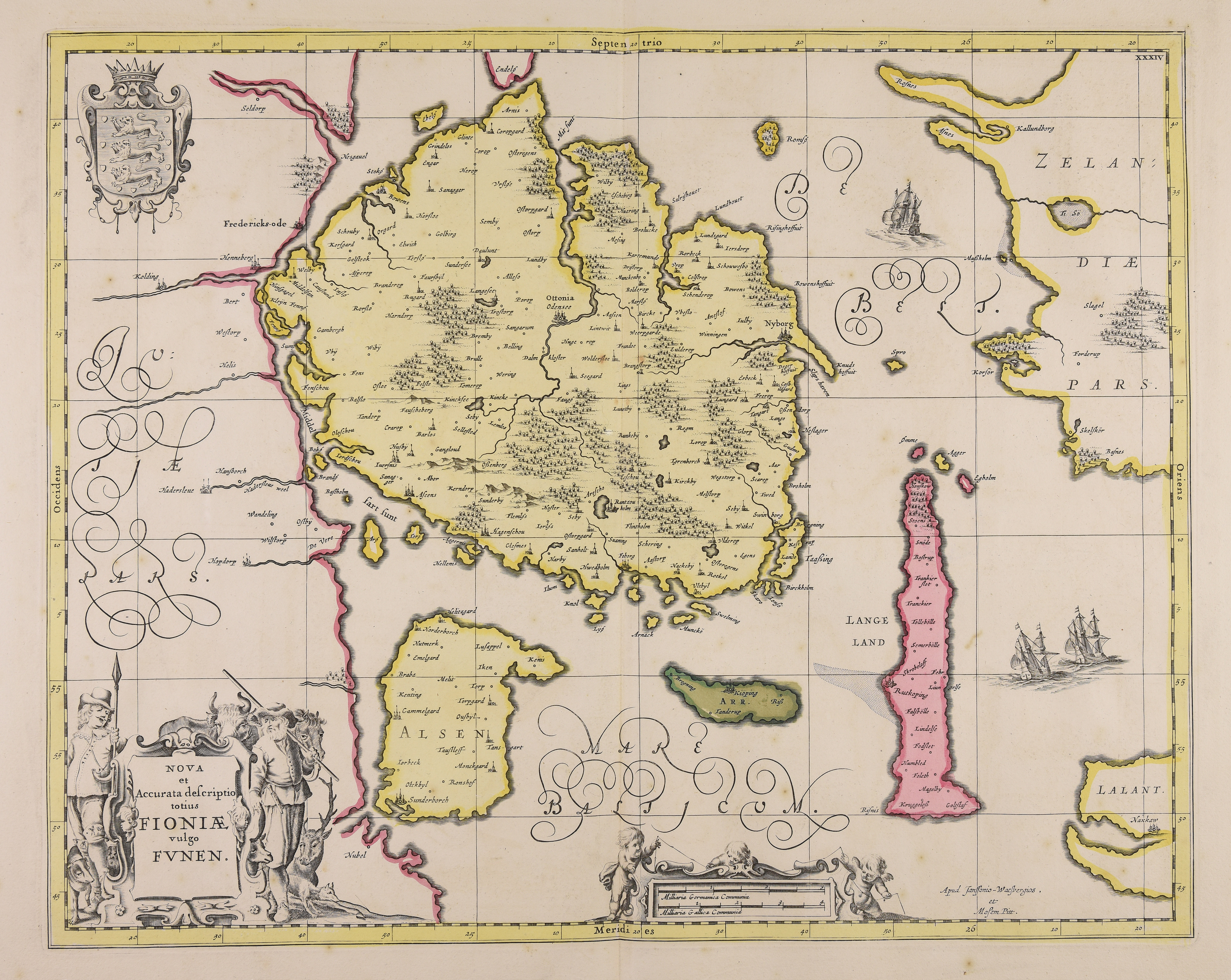
- Map of Funen from the National Library of France made in the 17th century
Date	February 1644
Location	Funen, Denmark–Norway (present-day Denmark) 55°21′N 10°21′E
Result	Danish victory

Belligerents
(yes) Swedish Empire	Denmark–Norway

Commanders and leaders
(yes) Lennart Torstensson	Unknown

Strength
70–80 boats	Several warships

Casualties and losses
1,000 killed 300 captured At least 15 boats destroyed	Unknown

The crossing attempt to Funen occurred in February 1644 during the Torstenson War between Denmark and Sweden.

In February, 70 to 80 Swedish boats began sailing towards Funen from Haderslev. However, as they approached the shore, they were spotted by the Danish defenders who opened fire. Retreating with losses, the Swedes were attacked by several Danish warships, who scattered the Swedes and caused further losses.

== Background ==
On 13 December 1643, after months of preparation by Axel Oxenstierna, a Swedish army of 16,000 men invaded Holstein under the command of Lennart Torstensson, sparking the eponymous Torstenson War between Denmark and Sweden.

On 9 January 1644, Swedish cavalry led by Robert Douglas defeated a force of 1,400 to 1,900 Danish cavalry led by Friedrich von Buchwald in the battle of Kolding. Buchwald was captured. Kolding and Koldinghus were also captured by the Swedes, the latter by storming.

=== Prelude ===
From his headquarters in Haderslev, Torstensson drew up multiple plans for a landing on Funen. One opportunity to do so had been missed in January, when Funen had very few Danish troops, as the Swedes could not find adequate transportation. Eventually, he prepared for a direct attack on Funen, to be carried out in early February.

To facilitate the crossing, the island of Bågø was occupied.

== Crossing ==
As they approached Funen's shore with 70 or 80 boats, (Note: Both historians Peter Englund and Michael Fredholm von Essen estimated 70–80 boats, while historians Arnold Munthe and Hans Henrik Jacobsen estimated just 70.) the Swedes were spotted by the Danes, who had already taken up position. They opened fire on the Swedes with artillery and muskets, immediately sinking some of their boats and damaging others. As this happened, the Swedes began trying to sail back to Jutland. However, several Danish warships intervened, opening fire on the Swedish boats after sailing in between them. More boats were destroyed, some being boarded. After scattering the retreating Swedish force which suffered a loss of 15 boats, the warships captured boats that had been left on Bågø and captured 300 Swedes in a redoubt on the island.

== Aftermath ==
Around 1,000 Swedes were killed during the failed crossing, most of whom died when they were exposed to the cold water after their boats had been destroyed. A second attempt to cross to Funen was made later, though it also failed. Danish warships would also open fire on any Swedish troops on the Jutland shore, almost hitting Torstensson on one occasion.
