= Hindsgavl Castle =

Manor house in Denmark

Coordinates: 55°30′18″N 9°41′22″E

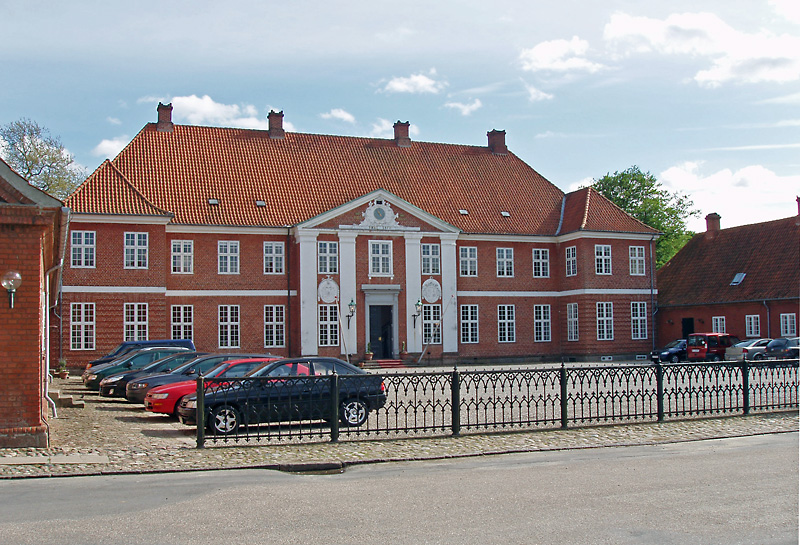
- Hindsgavl Castle
- Interactive map of the Hindsgavl Castle area

General information
- Type: Manor house
- Location: Middelfart, Funen, Denmark
- Completed: 1784
- Owner: Realdania By & Byg

Website
- www.hindsgavl.dk

Hindsgavl Castle (Danish: Hindsgavl Slot) is a historic manor house located near Middelfart on the island of Funen in Denmark.

== History ==
The history of Hindsgavl dates back to the Middle Ages when a royal castle stood on the site. The original fortress was constructed in the 13th century and served as a strategic stronghold controlling access through the Little Belt. The medieval castle was eventually abandoned and later demolished.

The present manor house was constructed in 1784 in the Neoclassical style. Over time the estate changed ownership several times before being restored in the late 20th century.

== See also ==
- List of castles in Denmark
