= Vardehus =

Danish fortress

Vardehus refers to two medieval fortresses that once existed in Varde, just north of Esbjerg, now completely disappeared. These fortifications were strategically placed by the Varde River to shield the town from maritime assaults.

The fortresses consisted of ramparts on either side of the river, which are mentioned in both Atlas Danicus and the Danske Atlas, but have since vanished. The northern rampart was removed during the first half of the 19th century due to river canalization; the southern mound still remains as a round elevation. On the site of the northern bulwark, the main castle bank was thought to have been located.

In the time of the Danske Atlas, remnants of the castle were still visible, along with embankments and moat traces; by the end of the 18th century, the site was fully leveled, uncovering remains of subterranean oak structures. The elevated castle bank stands about 5 meters high, measuring roughly 47 by 35 meters, surrounded by an 8-meter-wide moat.

According to a report by a priest in 1638, the fortress was destroyed on the 2nd of April 1439 during a peasant revolt.

== See also ==
- List of castles and palaces in Denmark
