= Krengerup =

Castle in Denmark

Coordinates: 55°18′33″N 10°07′09″E

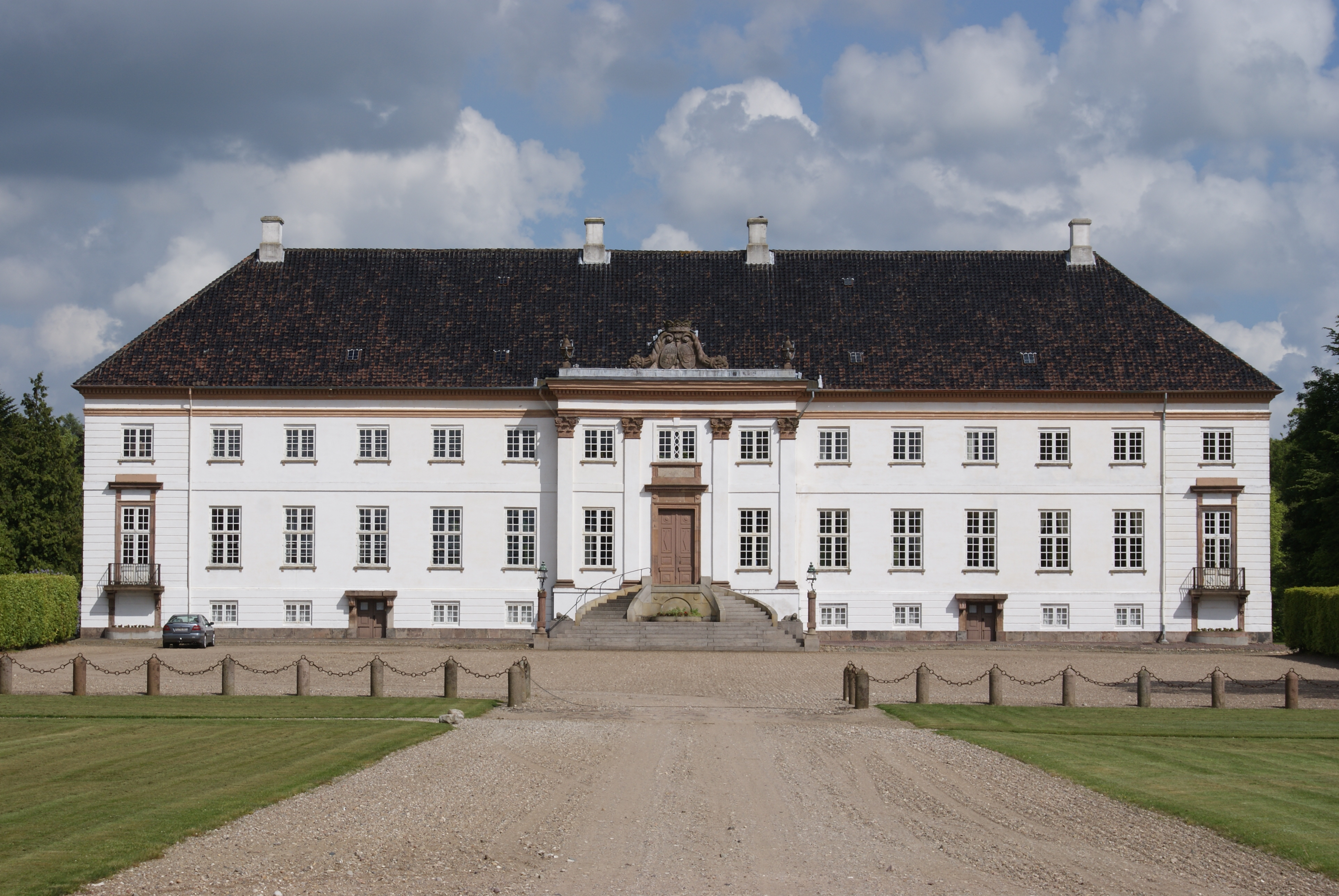
Krengerup

Krengerup is a Neoclassical manor house located near Glamsbjerg some 15 km (9.3 mi) northeast of Assens on the Danish island of Funen.

== History and architecture ==
The first references to Krengerup are from 1514 but the estate seems to be older. Since 1770, it has belonged to the Rantzau family. It was the principal property on a large estate which included Søholm and Brahesholm. In 1590, Gabriel Knudsen Akeleye built a thatched half-timbered house on the site of today's mansion. The property exchanged hands several times until Count Christian Rantzau purchased it in 1770. The farm buildings and the large separately standing manor were built by his son Frederik Siegfred from 1772 to 1783. The Neoclassical manor is thought to have been designed by Hans Næss (1723-1795). In 1783, the manor's name was changed to Frederikslund.

In 1917, the buildings were fully restored by Jens Christian Rantzau with the assistance of architect Jens Ingwersen. He also reinstated the name of Krengerup.

== Krengerup today ==
Kregerup still functions mainly as an agricultural enterprise but, in addition, it houses two museums: the Flax Weaving Museum, run by a group of volunteers, and the Škoda Museum, the only one of its kind outside the Czech Republic, which has been housed at Krengerup since 2001. The grounds are open to the public throughout the year.
