= Kongstedlund =

Manor house in Aalborg Municipality, Denmark

Coordinates: 56.8733°N 10.1492°E

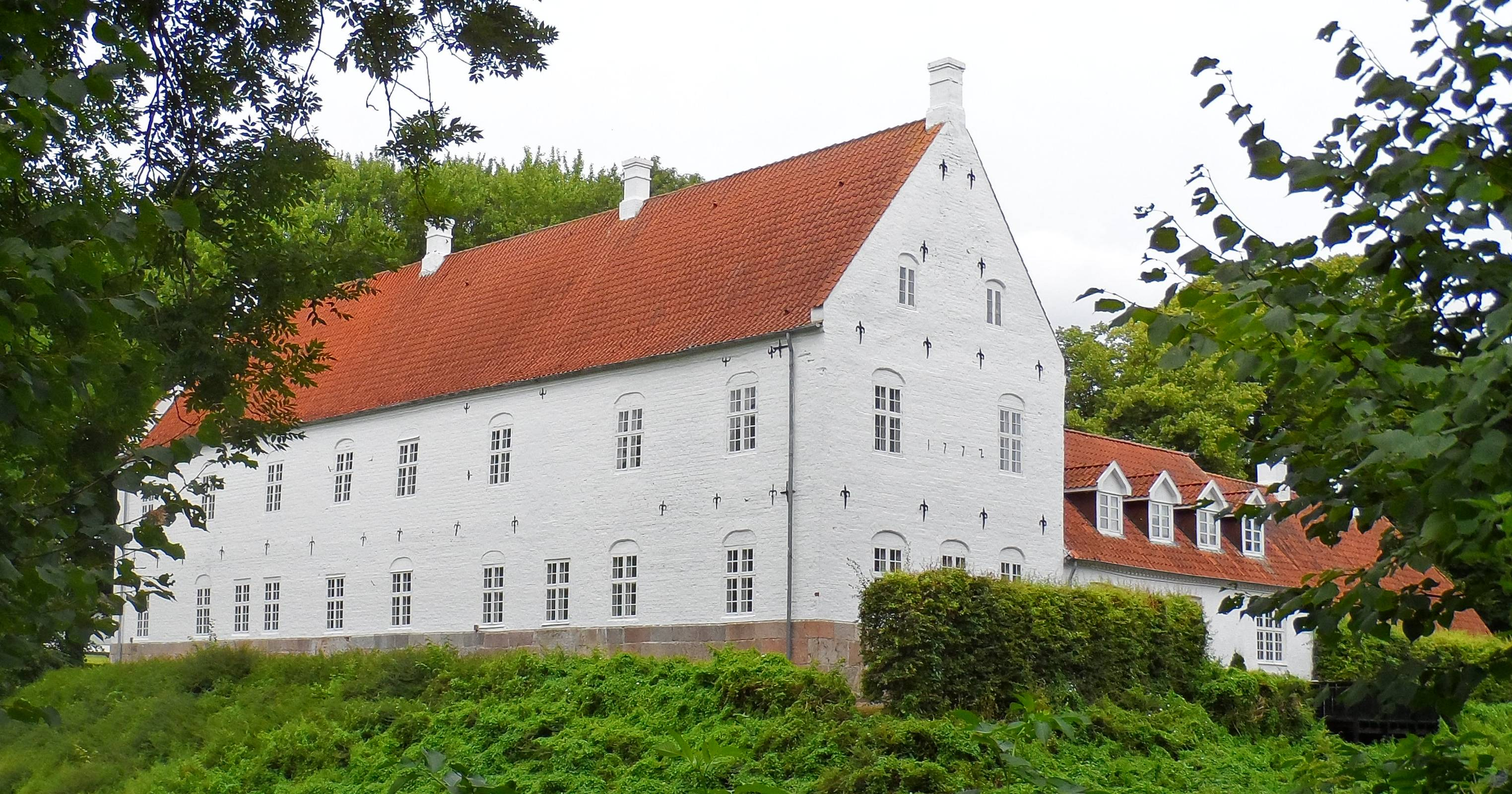
- The main building and side wing of Kongstedlund, 2014

General information
- Type: Manor house
- Architectural style: Renaissance
- Town or city: Himmerland
- Country: Denmark
- Year(s) built: 1592

Kongstedlund is an old Danish manor house built in 1592 in the Renaissance-style and situated on the peninsula of Himmerland near Aalborg. Kongstedlund is not open to the public, but the building can be seen from the nearby road.

== Architecture ==
Kongstedlund was built on the foundations of an ancient, storied castle, and is surrounded by drained moats. The main building was constructed in 1592 for the Danish nobleman Niels Juel. In 1640, a sandstone portal in the Baroque-style was added to the entrance of the main building by the owners of the property, Ivar Krabbe and Dorte Juul. In the 1770s, a low half-timbered wing was attached to the main building. Kongstedtlund rests upon an old arched vault that has remained as part of the older construction. The mansion's facades are now whitewashed, but were originally made unpainted brick. The levels of the main building are marked by anchor plates. The rectangle windows are embedded in curved window slots. The gables are now adjusted to the saddle roof in a straight line, but were originally probably arched in the style of the Renaissance. The baroque sandstone portal with the initials of the owners by that time, Ivar Krabbe and Dorte Juul, is a particularly precious architectural detail.

The most prominent elements of the portal are the sculptures of two warriors in full armour framing the entrance, as well as those of two angels, on which the uppermost part of the portal rests, and two female figures in the upper part which are framing a family coat of arms and a laurel wreath.

== Royal inhabitant ==
From 1922 to 1961, Princess Dagmar of Denmark, the daughter of Frederik VIII of Denmark and Louise of Sweden, lived on Kongstedlund. She was married to the squire Jorgen Castenskiold, hunting master of the Danish court and member of the ennobled Danish family Castenskiold.

== See also ==
- List of castles and palaces in Denmark
