= Gammel Vraa Castle =

Coordinates: 57.1939°N 9.9255°E

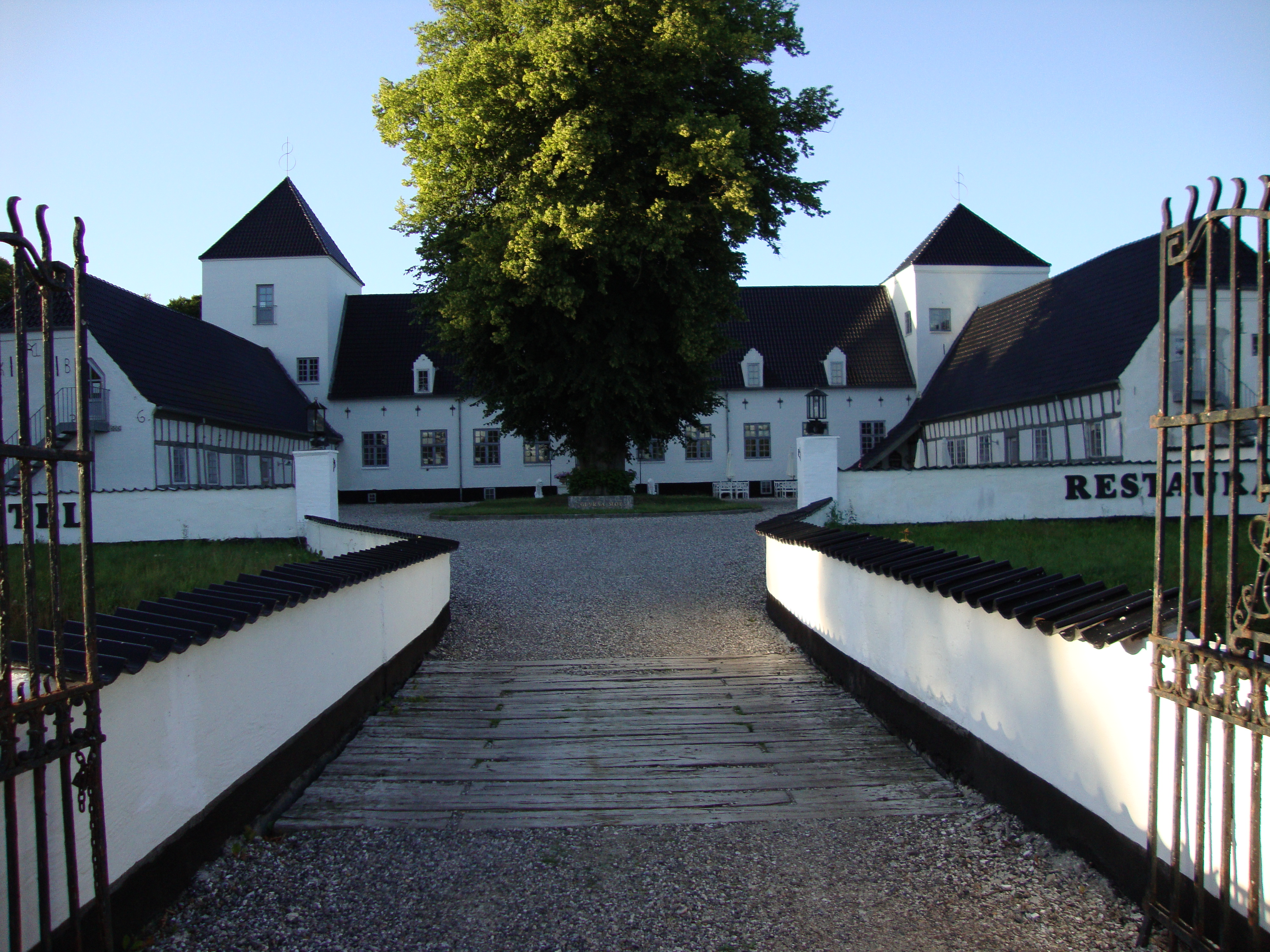
Gammel Vraa from the bridge over the moat

Gammel Vraa is a former manor house located in the town of Tylstrup in North Jutland, Denmark. It lies between forest and fields around 16 km from Aalborg. The nearest small towns are Sulsted and Tylstrup, which lies 3–4 km distance. The manor house has a moat around it with a wooden bridge over it that resembles a suspension bridge.

== History ==
The present two story house was built in 1645 under ownership of Ide Hansdatter Lindenov (c.1606- 1674) and her husband, Danish minister of Finance Steen Beck (1603–1648). At that time the estate of Gammel Vraa was the largest in Denmark. The initials of the couple is seen on the wall of the building and their initials can also be found at Ajstrup Church. The main building was rebuilt and two side wings erected in 1779.

In the 1900s, the manor house started to be used as a teaching place for farmers. In 1977 Chris Hillingsøe installed a hotel and added two towers. Vraa Slotshotel has a capacity of 43 double rooms as well as a restaurant.

== Other sources ==
- Danish Manor Houses and Estates by Carsten Porskrog Rasmussen, D.Phil., Museum of Southern Jutland
