= Arreskov Castle =

Coordinates: 55.1643°N 10.3150°E

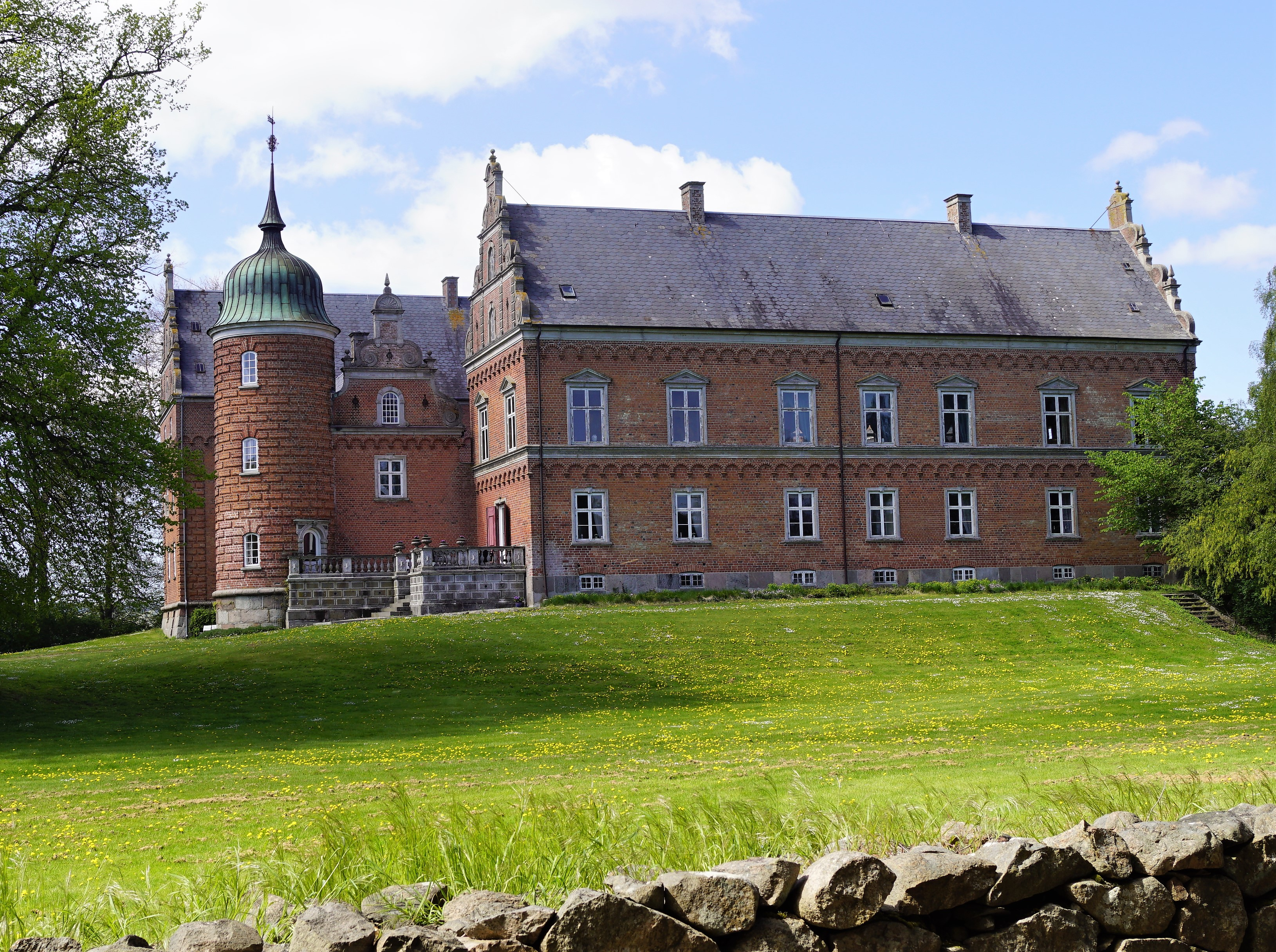
Arreskov from the east, May 2019

Arreskov is an ancient Danish manor with roots stretching back to the 13th century. It is situated in Øster Hæsinge Parish, Sallinge District, within Faaborg Municipality, Arreskov lies adjacent to Arreskov Lake.

== History ==
It was first mentioned in historical records in 1210. The current structure represents the third incarnation of Arreskov, a testament to its pivotal role in Danish nobility and history.

The manor has been the center of considerable historical interest, including being part of the County of Muckadell, established in 1784.

Arreskov's main building, primarily dating from the mid-16th century, stands on land that has seen two prior manor locations. The estate's historical significance is also marked by King Valdemar the Victorious, who bequeathed Arreskov to his son Abel in 1241. However, it was destroyed during the subsequent civil war among Valdemar's sons and again in the unrest under King Erik Klipping. Later, the Crown took over the estate, likely building a fortified farmstead on the premises.

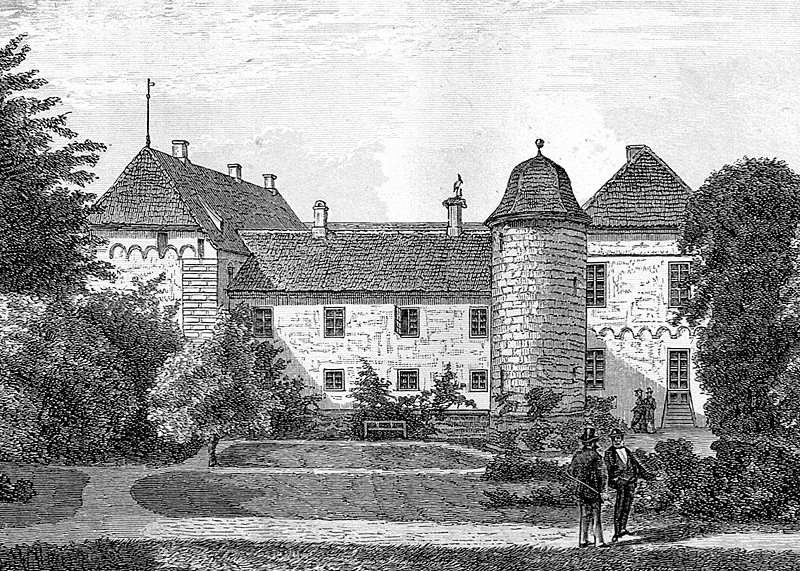
Arreskov around 1870

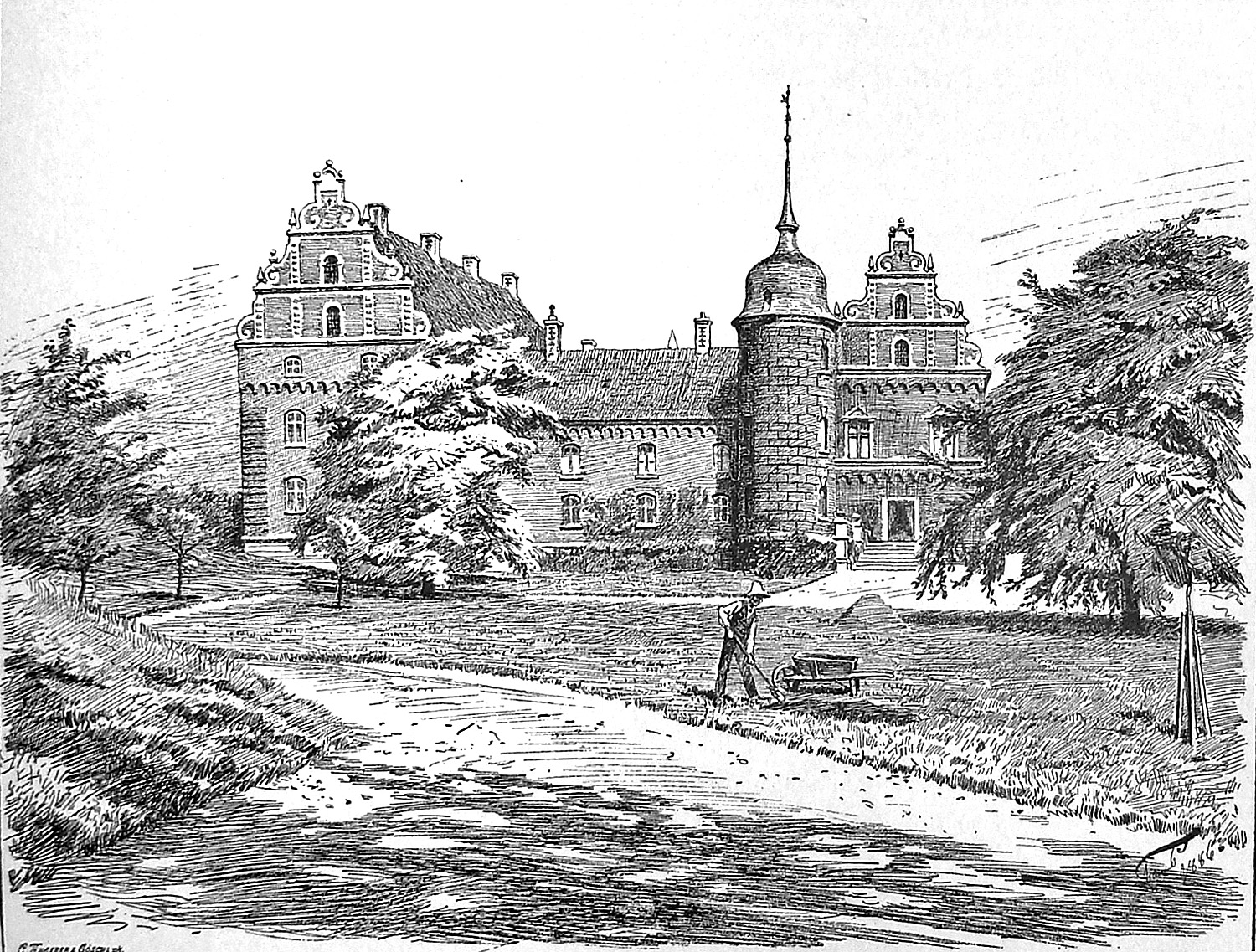
Arreskov in 1886, after the remodeling in 1872-73

The manor has also served various utilitarian roles throughout history, including being repurposed as a hospital during the Three Years' War from 1848 to 1850. Its cultural significance extends into the modern era, having been used as a filming location for the Danish film "Far til Fire - i stor stil" (Father of Four - In High Style), wherein the manor appears as a castle inherited by a character named Uncle Anders.

== Present-day ==
Today, Arreskov remains owned by the Schaffalitzky de Muckadell family and is a part of the larger Muckadell estate, which includes other significant properties like Brobygård and Gelskov. It stands as a well-preserved example of a Danish noble estate, showcasing architecture from across centuries and reflecting an evolving history that continues to captivate visitors and historians alike.
