= Skrøbelev Gods =

Manor in Denmark

Coordinates: 54.9252°N 10.7499°E

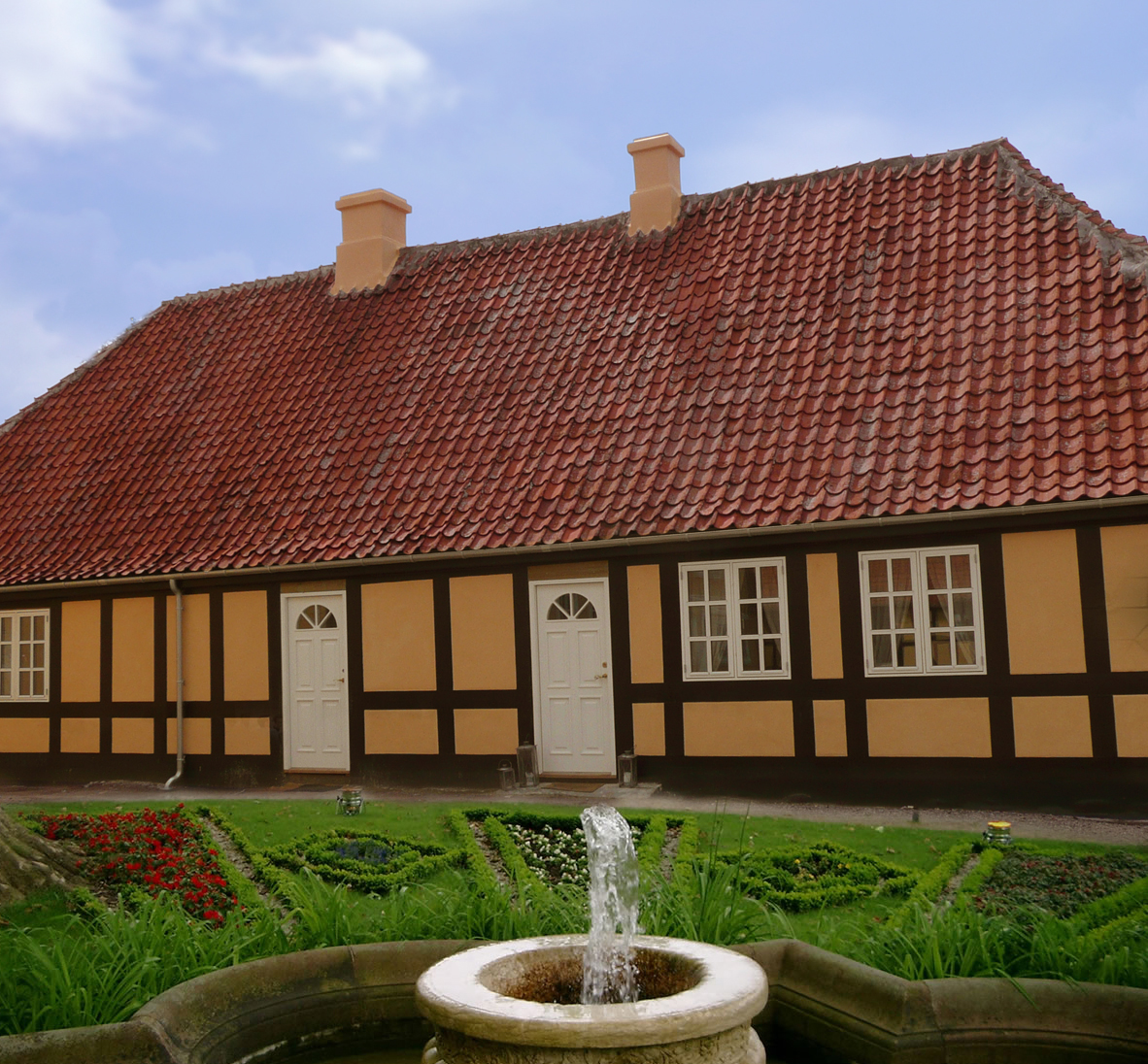
Skrøbelev Gods

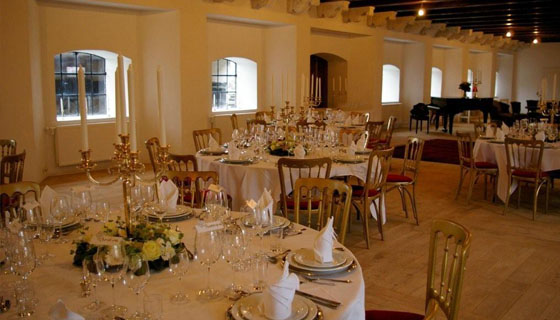
Dining area in the Knights Hall at Skrøbelev Gods

Skrøbelev Gods (Skrøbelev Manor) is a traditional manor house dating back to 1669. It is located on the island of Langeland in the south of Denmark.

== History ==
Skrøbelevgård Manor was built in 1669. The name has been changed from "Skrøbelevgaard" to the current name in 2007. The manor house has recently been renovated and is now used as a venue for weddings and other celebrations. The estate features a large courtyard, surrounded by the main building, green meadows with its display of strutting peacocks, a cascading fountain, moat and the bridge which leads to the church. It has six horse stables and the area is a popular destination for eco-tourists and anglers due to Langeland being a thin strip of land.

== Owners of Skrøbelev Gods ==
- (1669-1850) various owners
- (1850-1880) Boesgård
- (1880-1900) Rasmussen
- (1900-1910) dowager Rasmussen
- (1910-1924) N. Hansen
- (1924-1939) dowager Margrethe Hansen
- (1939-1961) L. Wester
- (1961-1981) Inge-Lise Wester / Hanne Wester / Jens Wester
- (1981-2006) Jan Tøndering / Lisbeth Tøndering
- (2006- ) Claus Agerskov

== Last Langelandic execution ==
The last execution on the island of Langeland was in the area of Skrøbelev in 1834, when Niels Arent was beheaded. He was buried on the local cemetery but there are rumors that he never found his peace and many people claim they have seen him haunting the cemetery at nights.

== Other Sources ==
- Jens Peter Trap (1858-59) Statistisk-topographisk Beskrivelse af Kongeriget Danmark (Kjøbenhavn: i Commission hos G.E.C. Gad)
