= Funen =

Island in Denmark

Native name: Fyn
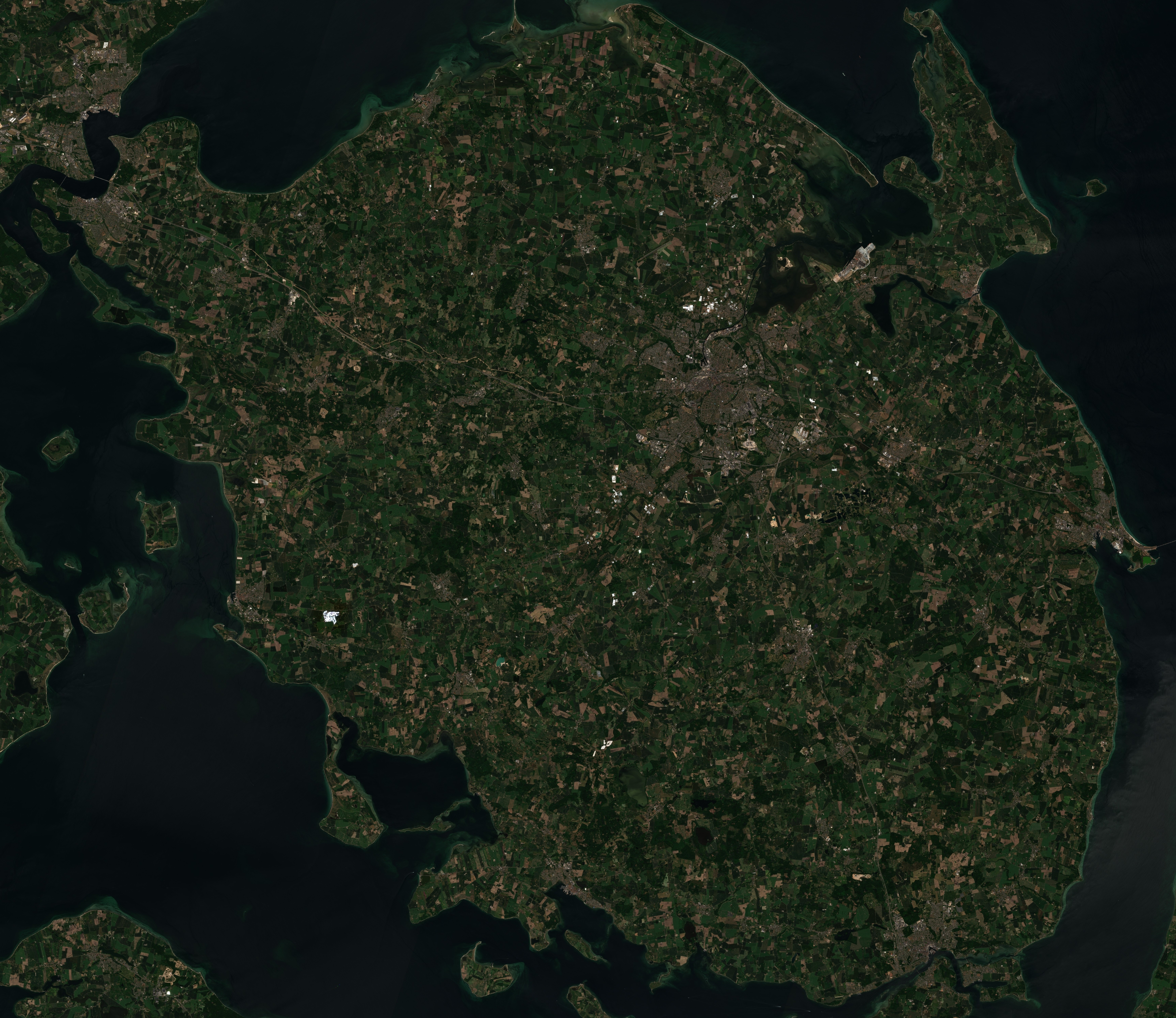
- A Sentinel-2 satellite image of the island

Geography
- Location: Kattegat
- Coordinates: 55°21′N 10°21′E
- Area: 2,984.56 km^{2} (1,152.35 sq mi)

Administration
- Denmark
- Region: South Denmark Region
- Municipality: Several
- Largest settlement: Odense (pop. 180,302)

Demographics
- Population: 469,947 (2020)
- Pop. density: 150/km^{2} (390/sq mi)

Funen (Danish: Fyn, pronounced [ˈfyˀn]) is the third-largest island of Denmark, after Zealand and Vendsyssel-Thy, with an area of 3,099.7 square kilometres (1,196.8 sq mi). It is the 165th-largest island in the world. It is located in the central part of the country and has a population of 469,947 as of 2020. Funen's main city is Odense, which is connected to the sea by a rarely-used canal. The city's shipyard, Odense Steel Shipyard, has been relocated outside Odense proper.

Funen belongs administratively to the Region of Southern Denmark. From 1970 to 2006, the island formed the largest part of Funen County, which also included the islands of Langeland, Ærø, Tåsinge, and a number of smaller islands.

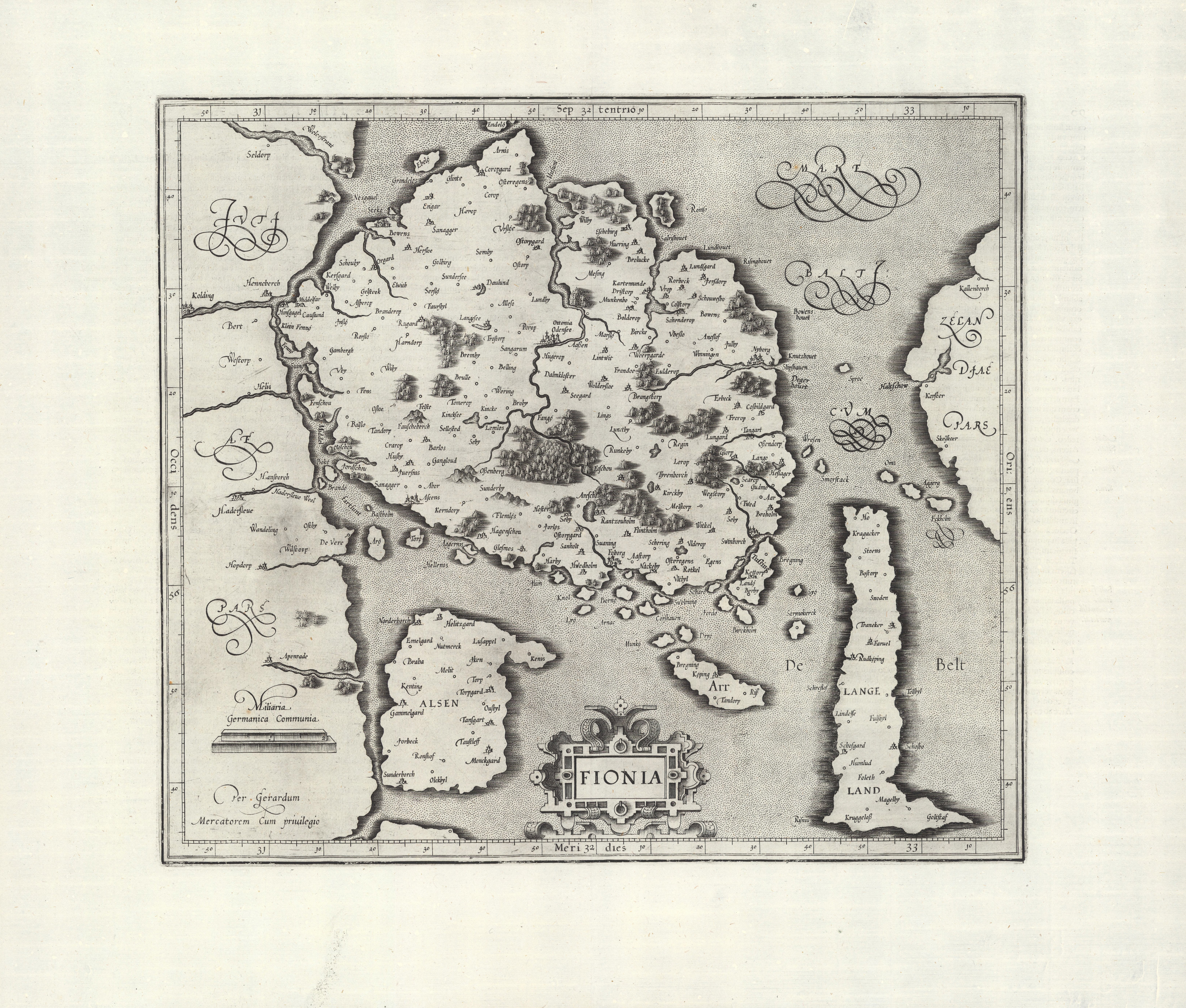
Map of the island of Funen, 1607

Funen is linked to Zealand, Denmark's largest island, by the Great Belt Bridge, which carries both trains and cars. The bridge is in reality three bridges; low road and rail bridges connect Funen to the small island of Sprogø in the middle of the Great Belt, and a long road suspension bridge (the second longest in the world at the time of opening) connects Funen the rest of the way to Zealand, paralleled by a rail tunnel.

Two bridges connect Funen to the Danish mainland, Jutland. The Old Little Belt Bridge was constructed in the 1930s, shortly before World War II, for both cars and trains. The New Little Belt Bridge, a suspension bridge, was constructed in the 1970s and is used for cars only.

The populations of the major cities and towns on the island are, as of 1 January 2024:

- Odense: 183,783
- Svendborg: 27,521
- Nyborg: 17,902
- Middelfart: 16,528
- Faaborg: 6,867
- Ringe: 6,729
- Kerteminde: 6,044
- Assens: 6,001
- Otterup: 5,270
- Bogense: 4,060

Funen was the birthplace of Hans Christian Andersen, the composer Carl Nielsen, American War of Independence combatant Christian Febiger, pop singer MØ and international footballer Christian Eriksen.

The highest natural point on Funen is Frøbjerg Bavnehøj.

== History ==
In February 1644 during the Torstenson War, Swedish troops onboard 70 boats attempted to land on the island, but they were repelled by the Danish defenders.

== Fynsk dialects ==
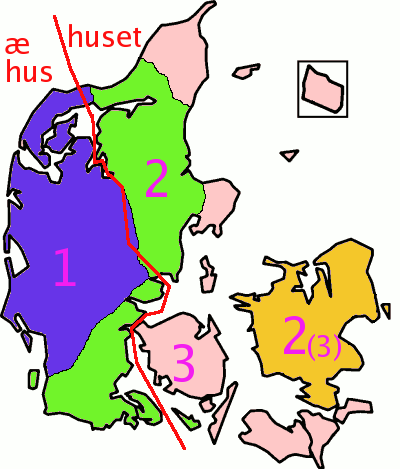
The distribution of one, two, and three grammatical genders in Danish dialects. In Zealand (marked in orange) the transition from three to two genders has happened fairly recently. West of the red line the definite article goes before the word as in English or German; east of the line it takes the form of a suffix.

Fynsk, colloquially known as Funish by local English speakers, but in English most commonly known as the Funen dialects, refers to the variations of Danish spoken on Funen and adjacent islands.

Locally, there can be significant variations, even within short distances, for example between neighboring towns. On the island of Funen, at least four main dialects are typically distinguished: East, North, South, and West Funen dialects, as well as sub-dialects such as the Tåsinge, Ærø, and Langeland dialects. West Funen dialects may further be divided into Northwest and Southwest Funen dialects.

The Funen dialects belong to what is referred to as Insular Danish, where the dialects have retained three grammatical genders: masculine, feminine and neuter. This is in contrast to Zealand, where, like in Swedish, a reduction to two genders has taken place, and large parts of Jutland, where, like in English, no such distinction is made.

For instance in masculine, the indefinite article is "ei" and the ending in the definite form is "-i": ei mar, mar'i, ei post, posti, ei vogn, vogni, ei ovn, ovni, ei kat, katti (a man, the man, a post, the post, a wagon, the wagon, an oven, the oven, a cat, the cat). These articles and endings are usually unstressed.

== Viking Age ==
In 2018, at Munkebo Bakke in northeastern Funen, archaeologists found an exceedingly large Viking hall that dates back to c. 825 – 1,000 CE. According to the Funen museum experts, this Viking hall is larger than any found on Funen before.

Galgedil is a Viking Age cemetery located in northern Funen. Excavations at the site revealed 54 graves containing 59 inhumations and 2 cremation burials.

== See also ==
- Broholm
- Den Selvforsynende Landsby
- Egeskov Castle
- Fynske Livregiment
- Horne Church
- Hvedholm Castle
- Korshavn, Denmark
- Skrøbelev Gods
- The Funen Village an open-air museum.
- Funen brachteate in the collections of the National Museum of Denmark.

== Works cited ==
- Munthe, Arnold [in Swedish] (1905). Klas Fleming, Karl Gustaf Wrangel. Martin Thijsen Anckarhielm, danska kriget 1643–1645: Omfattande tiden till Juli 1644 (PDF) (in Swedish). Vol. 5:1. Illustrated by Jacob Hägg. Stockholm: P. A. Norstedt & Söners förlag.
