= Ludvig Christian Brinck-Seidelin =

Danish politician

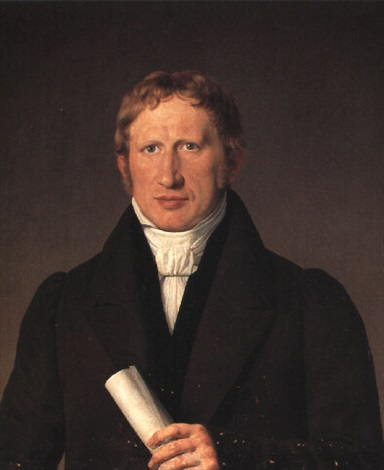
- Brinck-Seidelin painted by C. W. Eckersberg in 1832
- Born: 20 December 1787; Eriksholm, Denmark
- Died: 14 July 1865 (aged 77); Frederiksberg, Denmark
- Occupation: Civil servant
- Awards: Grand Cross of the Order of the Dannebrog, 1862

Ludvig Christian Brinck-Seidelin (20 December 1787 – 14 July 1865) was a Danish civil servant, landowner and politician. He was a member of the 1848 Danish Constituent Assembly.

== Early life and education ==
Brinck-Seidelin was born on 20 December 1787 in Eriksholm, the son and only child of judge Hans de Brinck-Seidelin (1750–1831) and Mariane Magdalene Eichel Bartholin (1752–1800). His paternal grand father was Hans Diderik Brinck-Seidelin who had died back in March that same year. Brinck-Seidelin's father was the owner of Eriksholm and Holbæk Ladegård.

Brinck-Seidelin attended Schouboe's Institute and graduated in law from the University of Copenhagen in 1812.

== Career in North Jutland, 1815–1845 ==
Brinck-Seidelin worked in the Treasury (Rentekammeret) from 1813 and was two years later appointed as county manager (amtsforvalter) of Hjørring County in North Jutland. His establishment of public book collections in 1837 contributed to his popularity among the local population.

He published several works on agricultural economics, including Var det gavnligt, om Forpagtningstiden af Bondejord var overladt til Contrahenternes Tykke? and om Bøndergaardenes Størrelse var uindskrænket? (1816). His Hjørring Amt was the fourth volume in a series of publications about Danish counties published by Landhusholdningsselskabet. It reflects his interest in the social conditions of the rural population. Selskabet for trykkefrihedens rette bru published his Populair Fremstilling af det danske Skatte- og Afgiftsvæsen in 1840. He also contributed with articles to many of the leading newspapers and magazines of the time.

== Career in Copenhagen, 1845–62 ==
Brinck-Seidelin left Hjørring in 1845 when he was appointed as decisor-general and head of the Treasury's accounting department. He was appointed as head of the audit department in 1860 and stayed in the position until his retirement in 1862.

== Politics ==
Brinck-Seidelin was one of the "enlightened men" who, in 1832, was tasked with preparing the planned Consultant Provincial Assembly. In 1834, he was elected as a member of Viborg Provincial Assembly in Aalborg. He belonged to the liberal party and was one of the more influential delegates. In 1838, he was an advocate of full eligibility of Jews. In 1840, he presented a petition in which Aalborg called for a free constitution and he was also the principal writer of the Provincial Assembly's petition to the king in 1848. In 1848, he was elected for the Danish Constituent Assembly in Hjørring County's 5 Constituency (Vrejlev). He was an active member but did not continue his political career as a landsting candidate.

Brinck-Seidelin was a board member of Selskabet til trykkefrihedens rette brug (Society for the Proper Use of the Free Press) and served as its president in 1848–50.

== Property ==
Brinck-Seidelin acquired Aggersborggård in 1838 but sold it again in 1846. He succeeded his father as holder of the Brinck-Seidelinske Fideikommis in 1831 but his father had sold Holbæk Ladegård in 1809 and Eriksholm in 1824 and the Brinck-Seidelinske Fideikommis had therefore been converted into capital.

== Personal life ==
Brinck-Seidelin married Maria Elisabeth Krag (1790–1874), a daughter of Schimmelmannøs servant Johan Krag (died 1802) and Anne Kirstine Hansdatter (died 1808 or later), on 30 December 1815.

== Honors ==
- Knight of the Dannebrog, 1840
- Dannebrogsmand, 1847
- Commander of the Dannebrog, 1856
- Grand Cross of the Dannebrog, 1862.
