= Hans Seidelin =

Hans Seidelin may refer to:

- Hans Hansen Seidelin (1632–1668), Danish priest
- Hans Seidelin (1665–1740), Danish county governor and landowner
- Hans Seidelin (1695–1752), Danish Supreme Court justice
- Hans Diderick de Brinck-Seidelin (1720-1778), landowner
- Hans Didrik Brinck-Seidelin, landowner who was ennobled in 1752
- Hans de Brinck-Seidelin (1750–1831), landowner
