= Seidelin family =

The Seidelin family is a Danish family descending from bailiff and councilman in Helsingør Michel Seidel (died 1616). He was originally from Werder in Pomerania or East Prussia and purchased a house in the city in 1589. Nothing else is known about his background. The name Seidelin was passed on through his daughters who in accordance with German tradition added the suffix -in to their father's name.

== Noble family ==
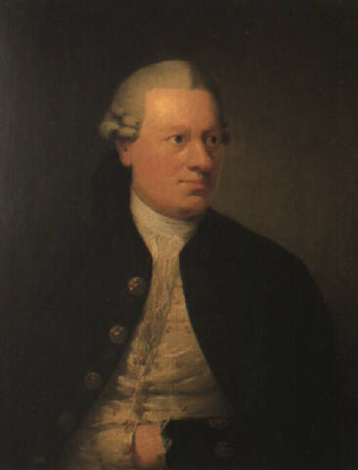
Hans Diderik de Brinck-Seidelin

Post Master-General Hans Seidelin (1665-1740), a great grandson of Michel Seidel, was ennobled in 1731.

His daughter, Sophie Seidelin (1693-1741) married royal confessionarius Iver Brinck (1719-1728). Their son, Hans Didrik Brinck-Seidelin (1720-1778), owner of Stamhuset Hagested, was ennobled under the name Brinck-Seidelin in 1752.

== Property ==
Post Master-General Hans Seidelin purchased Hagestedgård at Holbæk in 1730 and Holbæk Ladegård in 1732. Both estates were after his death passed on to first his son Hans Hansen Seideling and then his grandson Hans Didrik de Brinck-Seidelin. In 1752, Hans Diderik de Brinck-Seidelin also purchased Eriksholm. He sold Hagestedgård in 1769. His son Hans de Brinck-Seidelin sold Holbæk Ladegård in 1809 and Eriksholm in 1824.

Søren Seidelin owned Regstrup at Vejle from 1753 to 1755. Claus Seidelin Jessen owned Asserstrup from 1797 to 1803 and then Katrineholm at Vordingborg from 1804 to 182 and constructed its current main building. Claus Friederich Seidelin owned Sparresholm from 1805 to 1807. H.D. Brinck-Seidelin owned Nivaagaard north of Copenhagen from 1810 to 1812. Ludvig Christian Brinck-Seidelin owned Aggersborggård at Køgstør from 1838 to 1846. Carl Frederik Seidelin purchased Mindstrup at Vejle in 1870. The estate was owned by members of the Seidelin family until 2006.

== Notable family members ==
- Andreas Seidelin (1864-1935), jurist and hospital director
- Anna Sophie Seidelin, née Dreiøe (1913-1998), translator
- Bernhard Seidelin (1820-1863), architect
- Carl Seidelin (1833-1909), mathematician
- Christian Seidelin (1874-1962), prist
- Conrad Seidelin (1809-1878), urban planner
- Claus Seidelin (1702-1782), pharmacist and autobiographer
- Ferdinand Emil Seidelin (1822-1908), priest
- Hans Hansen Seidelin (1632-1668), priest
- Hans Seidelin (1665-1740), district governor (amtmand), post master-general and landowner
- Hans Seidelin (1695-1752), Supreme Court justice
- Harald Seidelin (1878-1932), physician
- Henning Seidelin (1904-1987), industrial designer
- Ingeborg Seidelin (1872-1914), painter
- Jens Seidelin (1790-1863), naval officer
- Klaus Henrik Seidelin (1761-1811), publisher printer and editor
- Mogens Seidelin (1913-1993), physician and personal historian
- Mogens Seidelin (born 1935), jazz musician
- Nicol Seidelin (1666-1737), priest
- Paul Seidelin (1906-1981), priest and theologian
- Paulus Seidelin (1813-1872), historian
- Sabinus Seidelin (1819-1904), owner of S. Seidelin.
- V.P. Seidelin (1781-1863), provost
