= Holbæk Ladegård =

Manor house in Holbæk Municipality, Denmark

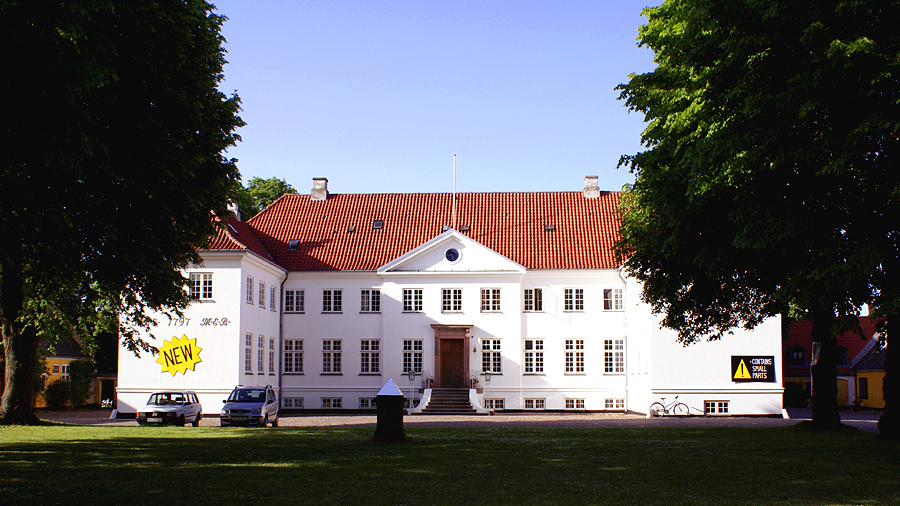
- The main building in 2008
- Interactive map of the Holbæk Ladegård area

General information
- Architectural style: Neoclassical
- Location: Copenhagen, Denmark
- Coordinates: 55°42′14.52″N 11°41′25.15″E
- Completed: 1898 (current main building)
- Client: Niels Juel
- Owner: State of France

Holbæk Ladegård is a former manor house at Holbæk, Denmark. It is now home to Kunsthøjskolen, a folk high school specializing in art programmes. Holbæk Ladegård was for centuries a home farm under Holbæk Castle, which was built to protect Holbæk and was held in fee by royal vassals.

== History ==
Holbæk is first mentioned in a document from 1199 in which Bishop Absalon presents in to Sorø Abbey. Most of the land was later ceded to the crown in exchange for property elsewhere. Holbæk Castle was most likely constructed by Valdemar II to protect the emerging market town of Holbæk. The castle was held in fee by royal vassals and Holbæk Ladegård served as the administrative centre of the land. of Holbæk. Christoffer Festenberg Pax became lensmand in 1563. He constructed a new home farm at the Castle but it later fell into neglect. A new home farm was finally built after a report in 1627 described the old one as "dilapidated".

Holbæk Castle was destroyed by Swedish troops in 1659. The castle was not rebuilt after the war. Holbæk Ladegård with its tenant farms was instead sold to Henrik Thott, the owner of Boltinggaard. Ub 1667 he sold the estate to professor Bertel Bartholin, a professor at the University of Copenhagen, but he soon sold it again. The estate then changed hands many times.

In 1706, Holbæk Ladegård was bought by Gregers Juel. His son, Peder Juel, sold it to Hans Hansen Seidelin in 1752. He was already the owner of nearby Hagestedgård. He had no male heirs and the two estates were therefore entailed to his nephew, Hans Diderich de Brinck-Seidelin. In 1769, Brinck-Seidelin established a stamhus (family trust) from the estates Holbæk Ladegård, Hagestedgård and Eriksholm (bought 1758). The effects of a stamhus was that the land could neither be sold, pawned or divided between heirs. Brinck-Seidelin's son, Hans de Brinck-Seidelin, inherited the estates in 1772. He demolished the old buildings of the three estates and replaced them with a single one at a new site in 1798. The stamhus was dissolved with royal approbation in 1809.

Holbæk Ladegård was then sold to Hans Peder Kofoed, a merchant and shipowner from Copenhagen. His city home was the Kofoed House in Christianshavn. His widow took over the estate after his death in 1812. She managed it with great skill during the agricultural crisis of the 1820s. After her death in 1839, it was acquired by F. V. Rottbøll. He sold most of the tenant farms to the tenant farmers. The remaining part of the estate was sold at auction after his death. The buyer was Baron Herman Frederik Løvenskiold. The estate then changed hands several times before it was purchased by Paul Dahl in 1913. He commissioned the architect Thorvald Jørgensen to refurbish the main building. He also expanded the farm buildings.

Paul Dahl's son sold the estate to Holbæk Municipality in 1962. The land was then sold off in lots for new housing while the buildings and park were turned into a folk high school.

== List of owners ==
- ( -1661) The Crown
- (1661-1667) Henrik Thott
- (1667-1676) Bertel Bartholin
- (1676-1684) Mouritz Podebusk
- (1684-1691) Frederik Vittinghof Scheel
- (1691-1706) Schack Brockdorff
- (1706-1731) Gregers Juel
- (1731-1752) Peder Juel
- (1752) Hans Seidelin
- (1752-1772) Hans Diderich de Brinck-Seidelin
- (1772-1809) Hans de Brinck-Seidelin
- (1809-1812) Hans Peder Kofoed
- (1812-1839) Marie Kofoed
- (1839-1866) F. Rottbøll
- (1866-1877) Herman Frederik Løvenskiold
- (1877-1882) J. Sønnichsen
- (1882-1912) G. Ree
- (1912-1913) Johannes Lawaetz
- (1913-1914) M. Alstrup
- (1914-1939) Paul Dahl
- (1939-1955) Else Wørishøffer, married 1) Dahl, 2) Kastberg
- (1955-1963) Torben Dahl-Kastberg
- (1963- ) Kunsthøjskolen at Holbæk
