= Bussert =

Bussert is a German language surname. It stems from the male given name Burchard – and may refer to:

- Karl-Heinz Bußert (born 1955), German rower
- Martin Bussert (dead after 1552), Danish architect
- Meg Bussert (born 1949), American actress
