= Hagested Church =

Hagested Church Hagested Kirke
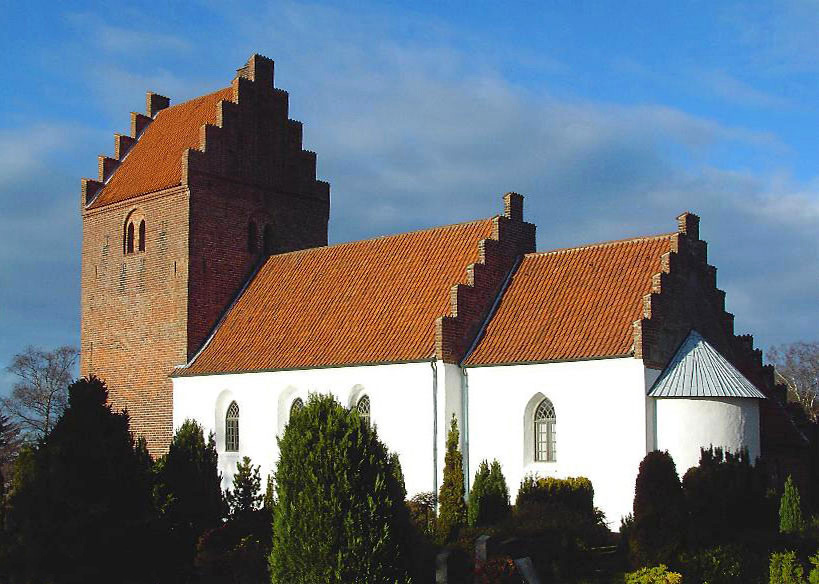
- Hagested Church
- Hagested Church; Hagested Kirke
- 55°44′43″N 11°37′08″E
- Location: Hagested
- Country: Denmark
- Denomination: Church of Denmark
- Previous denomination: Catholic

History
- Founded: C. 1175

Architecture
- Functional status: Functional
- Style: Romanesque; Late Gothic

Administration
- Division: Holbæk Municipality
- District: Region Zealand

Hagested Church (Danish: Hagested Kirke) is a Church of Denmark parish church situated in the little village of Hagested, adjacent to Hagestedgård, between Holbæk and Nykøbing Sjælland, some 80 kilometres (50 mi) west of Copenhagen, Denmark.

== History ==
Hagested Church was constructed in the second half of the 12th century. In 1540, Hagestedgård was ceded to Johan Friis in exchange for other land. On 16 September, Hagested Church was also ceded to him on condition that he would always see to it that the parish had a parish priest. In 1909, Hagested Church gained its independence.

== Church frescos ==
Jacob Kornerup was responsible for the uncovering and restoration of Romanesque frescos in the apse and on the triumphal wall in 1862. It is believed that they were created by the Jørlunde Workshop (1150–1175), which was associated with the Hvide family. More frescos were discovered on the north wall of the chancel in connection with a renovation of the church in 1973.

== Furnishings ==
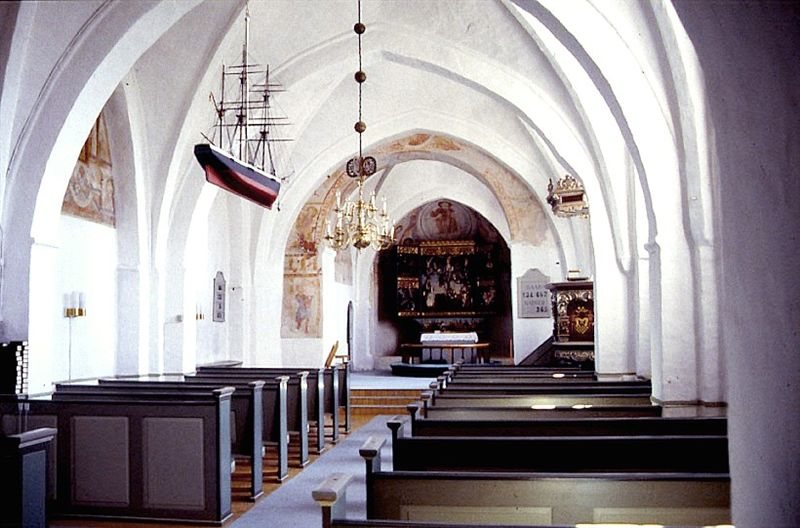
Interior

The triptych altarpiece is from the Late Gothic period. The pulpit is from c. 1659. There is a Romanesque baptismal font.

== Churchyard ==
Notable burials in the churchyard include:

- Christian Ludvig Castenschiold (1782–1865), military officer
- Niels Elgaard (1879–1963), politician and editor
