= Hans Peder Kofoed =

Danish brewer, merchant and shipowner

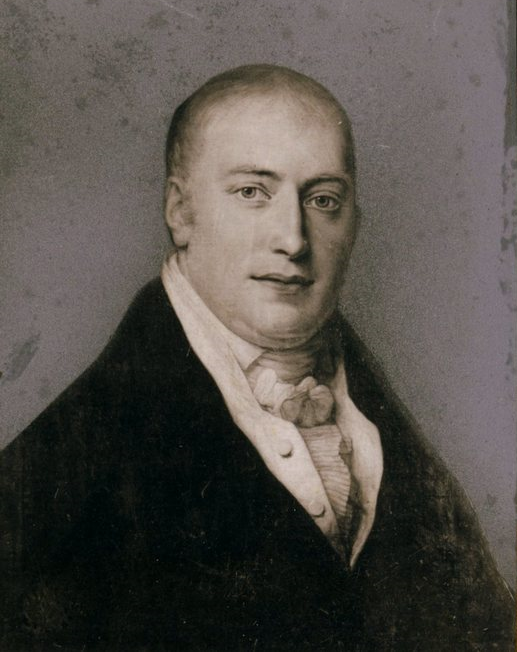
- Kofoed painted by J.A. Bech
- Born: C. 1 October 1743; Svaneke, Bornholm, Denmark
- Died: 3 January 1812 (aged 68); Copenhagen, Denmark
- Occupations: Industrialist, merchant, ship owner, ship builder, landowner, brewer
- Awards: Grand Cross of the Dannebrog

Hans Peder Kofoed (c. 1 October 1743 – 3 January 1812) was a Danish brewer, merchant and shipowner who became wealthy from trade in the Danish West Indies. He constructed the townhouse on Christianshavn in Copenhagen that is now known as the Heering House after a later owner. Late in his life, he also acquired the estates Holbæk Ladegård and Astrup near Holbæk and Roskilde. His widow, Marie Kofoed, established a memorial foundation in his name-

== Early life ==
Kofoed was born in Svaneke on Bornholm. He grew up on the Kofoedgård estate in Østermarie as the son of merchant Peder Jørgensen Kofoed (1707-1778). He moved to Copenhagen as a young man where he passed the Skippers' Guild's navigational exam on 16 December 1764.

== Career ==
A few years later, he sailed as a mate on board the merchant ship Prinsesse Louis to Saint Croix in the Danish West Indies. He became captain of the ship in 1772 and was licensed as skipper that same year..

In the period 1772-1782, Kofoed completed a total of 10 voyages to Saint Croix as a skipper. Each voyage generally lasted approximately 9 months and he departed in the autumn and returned in early summer.

Records from the Copenhagen Skippers' Guild show that Kofoed was a co-owner of the following ships:

- 1772: Cornelius (frigate)
- 1776 Laurentius (frigate)
- 1779: Elisabeth (frigate)
- 1780s: General Clausen (frigate)
- Unknown year: Den unge Maria
- Anna (frigate)

He later bought more ships and replaced some of the old ships by new ones. Over the course of his 30-year career as a skipper, he owned shares in a total of 23 ships. He mainly imported sugar, rum and other colonial goods. He was also very active in the market for loans to the plantation owners on St. Croix.

He sold his ships in 1807 after the war with England had made trading on the Danish West Indies less profitable. His two last ships were sold in 1809.

== Property ==
In 1783, he purchased an old property overlooking Christianshavns Kanal in the Christianshavn district of Copenhagen.

In the late 1880s, after selling his ships, Kofoed purchased Holbæk Slots Ladegård with 50 barrels of land. In 1810 he also purchased Astrup Manor at Roskilde with 100 barrels of land.

== Legacy ==
Kofoed died in 1812. His widow established a memorial foundation in his name.
