= Holbæk Castle =

Coordinates: 55°43′06″N 11°42′19″E

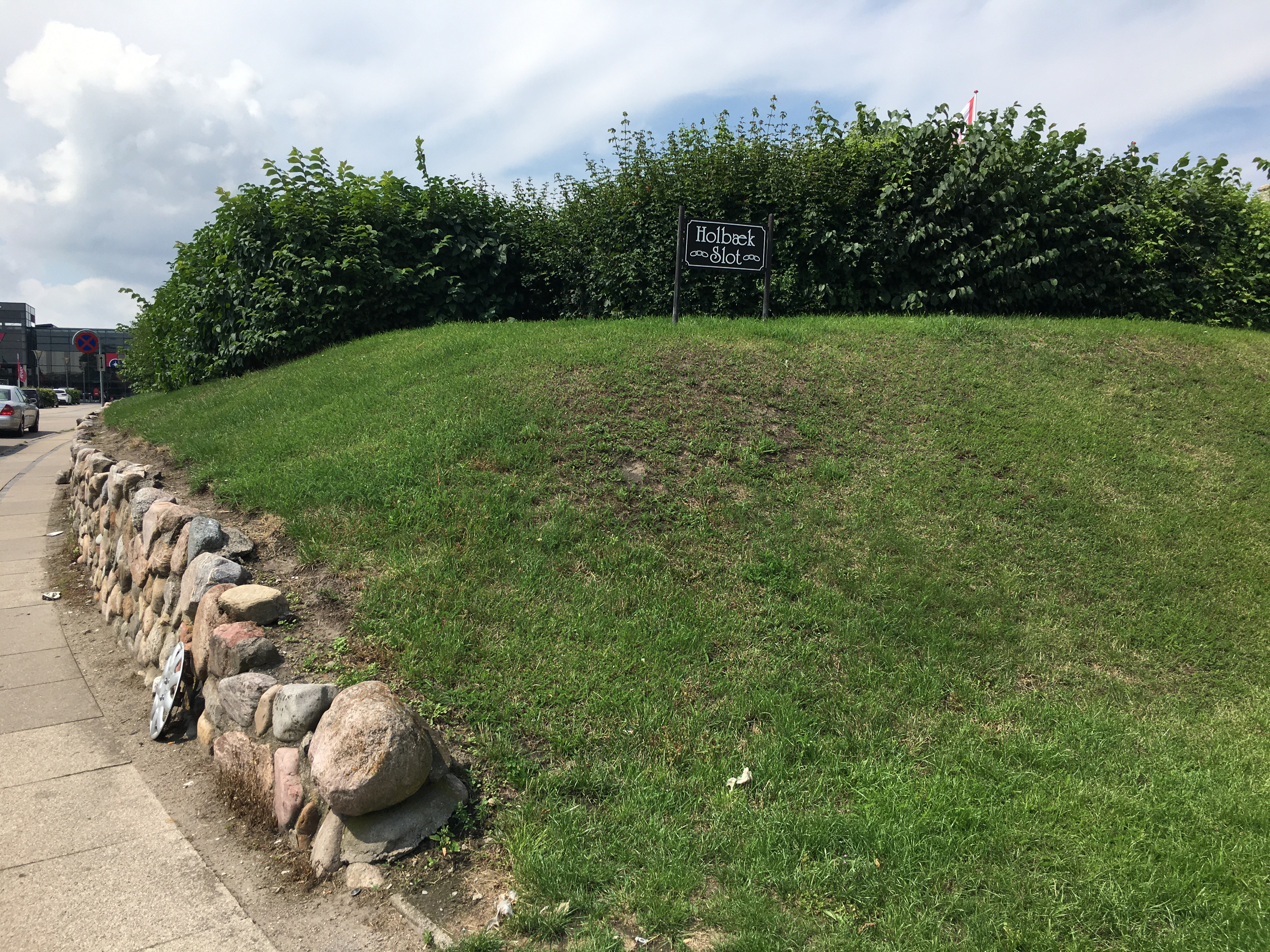
The remains of the castle.

Holbæk Castle (Danish: Holbæk Slot) is a mansion in Holbæk, Denmark, built in 1809 on the former site of a medieval castle constructed by Valdemar II of Denmark in the 13th century. The castle was destroyed during the Dano-Swedish War of 1658–1660. The castle also reigned over Holbæk Slot Ladegård which still stands. A small remnant of the former castle has been preserved in the cellar of the current building. The site is currently used as an event space.
