= Hesselagergård =

Coordinates: 55°09′26″N 10°45′46″E

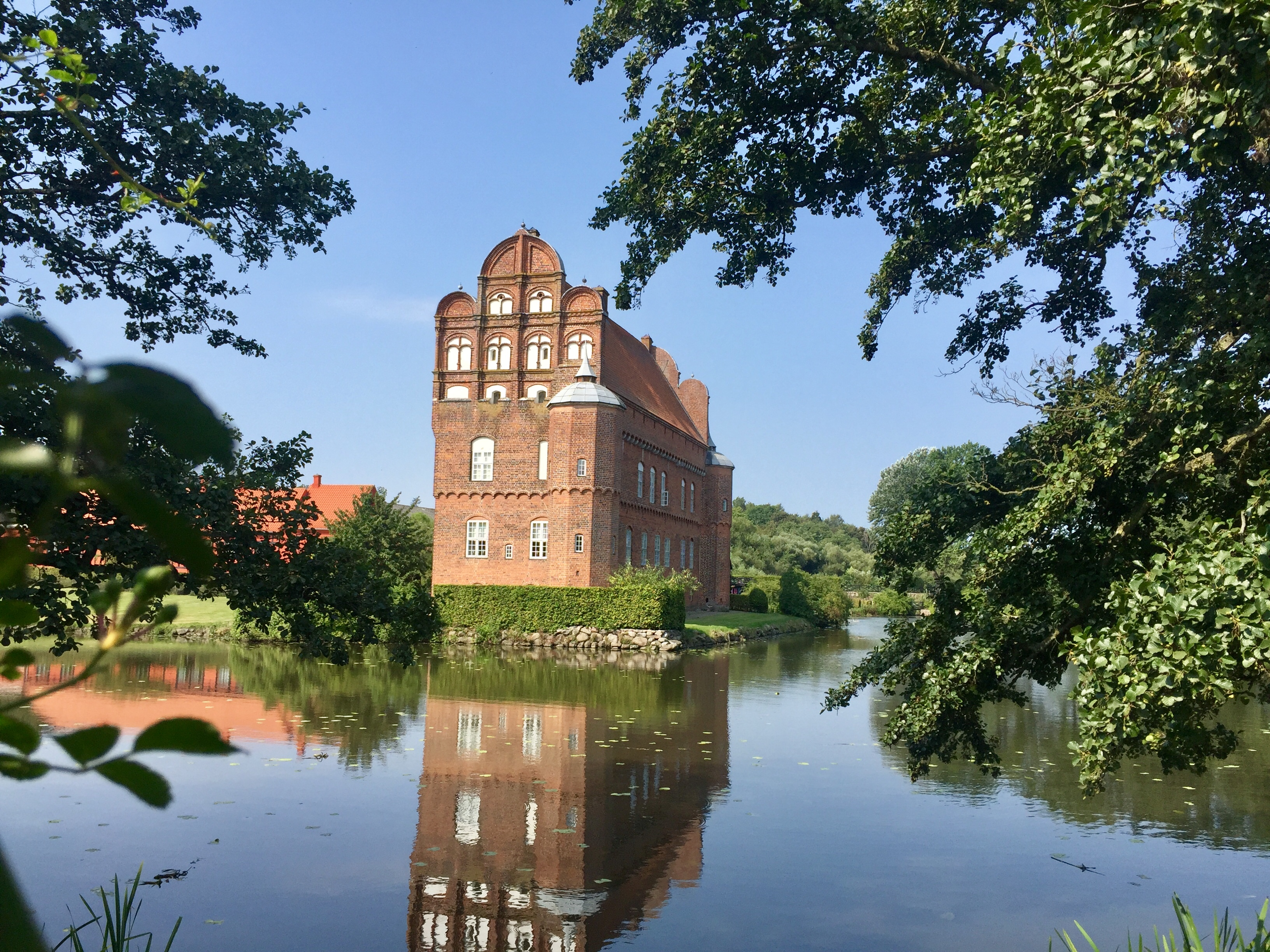
- Interactive map of the Hesselagergård area

General information
- Architectural style: Renaissance
- Location: Funen, Denmark
- Construction started: 1538
- Completed: 1550
- Client: Johan Friis

Technical details
- Structural system: Masonry on granite plinth

Design and construction
- Architects: Martin Bussert and others

Hesselagergård (or Hesselager Manor), located near Gudme in the southeast of the Danish island Funen, is the oldest Renaissance building in Denmark. It was built by Johan Friis, one of the most powerful men in Denmark during the reigns of Christian III and Frederick II.

== History ==
It is first documented in the 13th century when it was mentioned in Valdemar II's Liber Census Daniæ as Crown land. In 1419, it belonged to the Bild family.

From 1538–1550 it was rebuilt in Renaissance style by Johan Friis. Construction of the main building began in 1538, probably under the direction of Martin Bussert. It was a late-Gothic stone house in two stories with a tower in the northeastern corner. In 1548 an extra story and two more towers were added, probably by Jacob Binck. In 1550 the building was given its original roof. The estate remained in the Friis family until 1682.

In June 1850 Hans Christian Andersen visited the Hesselagergård Estate. In his diary, he described how he felt ill at ease when he saw the portraits of the Duke of Augustenborg and the Prince of Nør "plastered on the walls of the lavatory" (the diary, 22 June).

From 1904 the estate has been owned by the von Blixen-Finecke family.

== Architecture ==
The construction started as a late gothic defensive castle, built of large red brick on a granite plinth and surrounded by a moat, but by the end it had introduced many renaissance features. Especially noteworthy are the highly decorated hipped, round gables inspired by Venetian renaissance church architecture. They are among the earliest known examples of this kind in Northern Europe. Not until the following decades are they seen in townhouses of Northern France and Austrian castles, such as Schwerin castle and Gadebusch (1580–1583).

Also typical of the time are the blank arches below the projecting masonry and the watchman's passage at the top with machicolation for missiles and boiling a liquid (as, for example, on Johan Friis' manor house Borreby on Sjælland). Other notable features are the decorative tops to the towers and depressed round-arched windows.

Internally, Hesselagergård is famous for its frieze in the Deer Room. It depicted large deer, landscapes, towns, and people and was probably executed by Jacob Brinck around 1550.

== List of owners ==
- (1183–) Kronen
- (1419) Jakob Ottesen Bild
- (1446–1468) Henrik Friis
- (1495–1503) Otto Friis
- (1503–1522) Jesper Friis
- (1522–1570) Johan Friis
- (1570–1610) Niels Friis
- (1610–1642) Tønne Friis
- (1642–1658) Niels Friis
- (1658–1679) Ingeborg Parsberg, gift Friis
- (1679–1682) Boet efter Ingeborg Parsberg, gift Friis
- (1682–1702) Poul Zachariassen Grønneval
- (1702–1725) Niels Rasmussen Buchholtz
- (1725–1726) Gråbrødre hospital
- (1726–1750) Lorens Baggesen
- (1750–1764) Øllegaard Nielsdatter Buchholtz, gift Baggesen
- (1764–1766) Boet efter Øllegaard Nielsdatter Buchholtz, gift Baggesen
- (1766–1798) Niels Baggesen
- (1798–1802) Johan Frederik Friis
- (1802–1819) Simon Andersen Dons
- (1819–1868) Andreas Simonsen Dons
- (1868–1886) Simon Andreasen Dons
- (1886–1888) Laura Christine Petrine Schaumann, gift 1) Dons, 2) Møller
- (1888–) H.H. Møller
- (–1904) Andreas Laurits Schaumann Dons
- (1904) Carl Vilhelm Behagen Castenskiold
- (1904–1944) Bertha Henriette Marie Castenskiold, gift von Blixen-Finecke
- (1944–1954) Carl August von Blixen-Finecke
- (1954–1955) Enkefru von Blixen-Finecke
- (1955–1963) Anna Elisabeth von Blixen-Finecke, gift Møller
- (1955–1985) Gustav Frederik von Blixen-Finecke
- (1985–) Henrik von Blixen-Finecke
