= Heering House =

Neoclassical house in Copenhagen, Denmark

- Heerings Gård
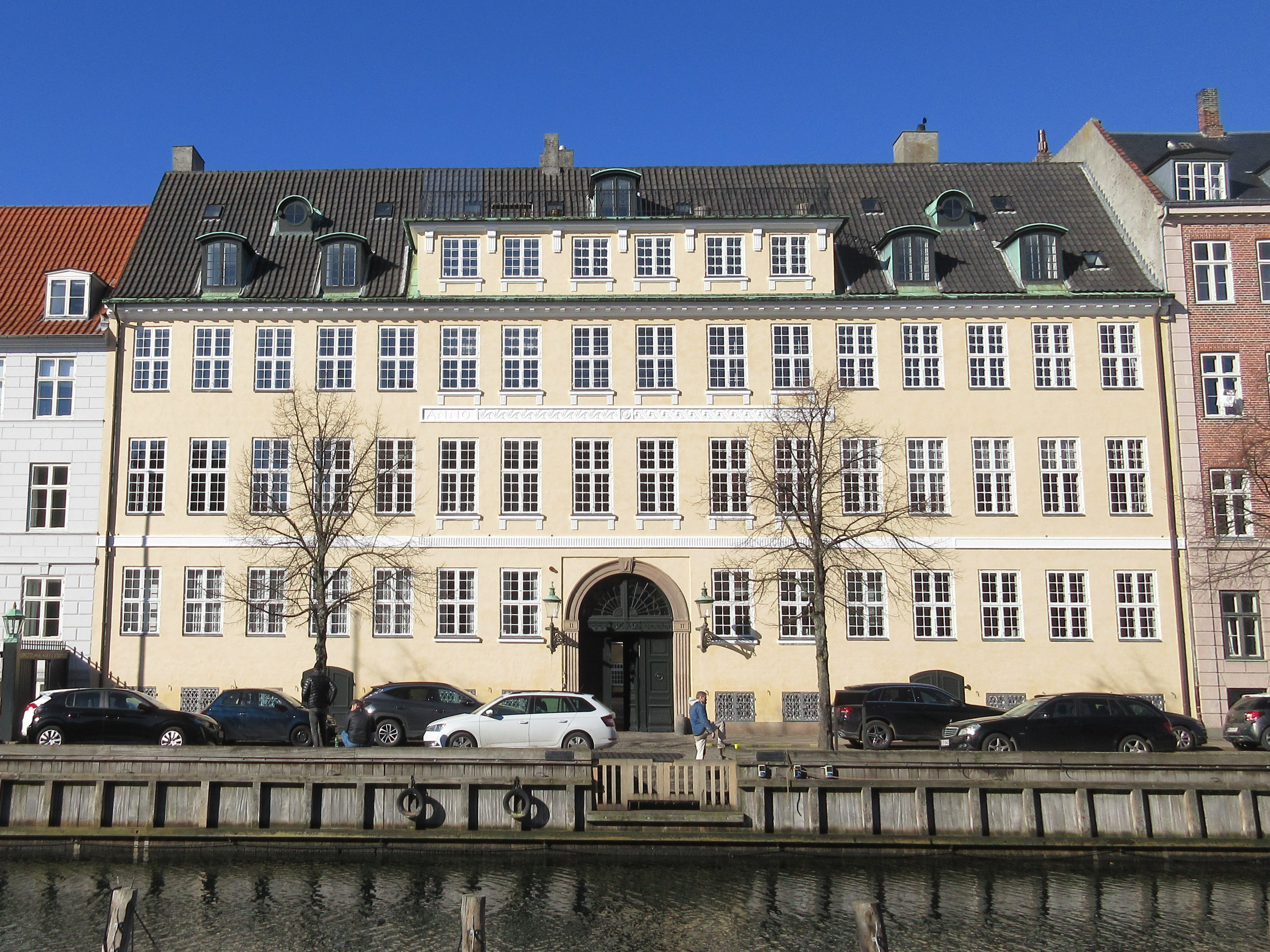
- The building seen from across the canal

General information
- Architectural style: Neoclassical
- Location: Copenhagen, Denmark, Denmark
- Coordinates: 55°40′19.95″N 12°35′23.08″E
- Completed: 1785
- Client: Hans Peder Kofoed
- Owner: Nordea Foundation

Design and construction
- Architect: G. E. Rosenberg

The Heering House (Danish: Heerings Gård) is a Neoclassical house overlooking Christianshavn Canal in the Christianshavn neighbourhood of Copenhagen, Denmark. It takes its name from Peter Frederik Suhm Heering (1792-1875) who owned it from 1838 until his death in 1875 and it continued to serve as headquarters for his company, Peter Heering, until 1977. The building is now home to the Nordea Foundation and a museum dedicated to banks and saving banks, as well as six residences available to foreign researchers and specialists.

== History ==
=== Early history ===
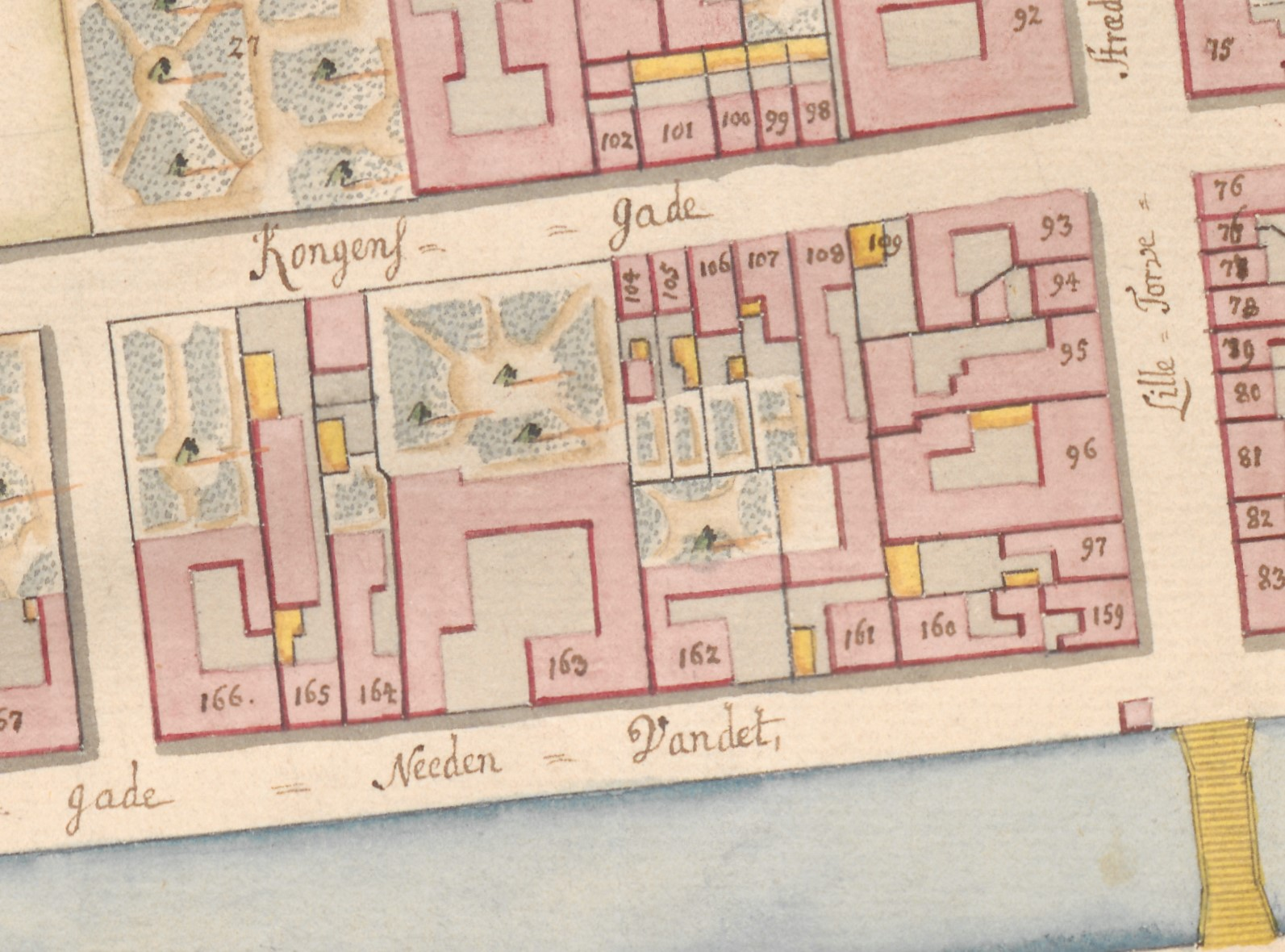
No. 163 seen in a detail from Christian Gedde's map of Christianshavn Quarter, 1757

The property was listed as No. 60 in Christianshavn Quarter in Copenhagen's first cadastre of 1689. It was at that time owned by Kirsten Nielsen, widow of brewer Espen Nielsen.

The property was acquired by brewer and timber merchant Peter Casse (1697-1782). He was originally from Flensbiurg. Gasse was also active in the slave trade. He was responsible for sending around 20 ships to the West Indies with slaves. He was elected as councilman. In 1749, he was one of the members of the Herman congregation who applied for royal permission to build Frederick's German Church. He was also elected as one of the "directors" of the construction process. In 1753 he constructed a new brewery building on the rear of his property. The property was listed as No. 163 in the new cadastre of 1756. Casse was also the owner of a warehouse at Bådsmandsstræde 4. He kept the property until his death. He is buried in the crypt of Christian's Church (Chapel 2).

=== Kofoed family ===
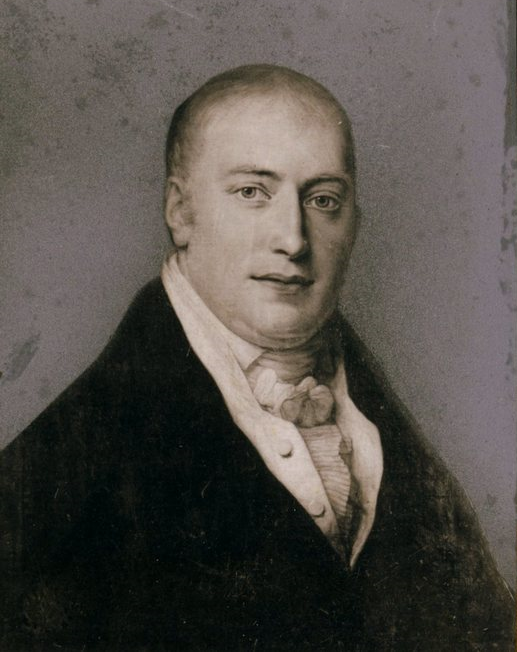
Hans Peter Kofoed

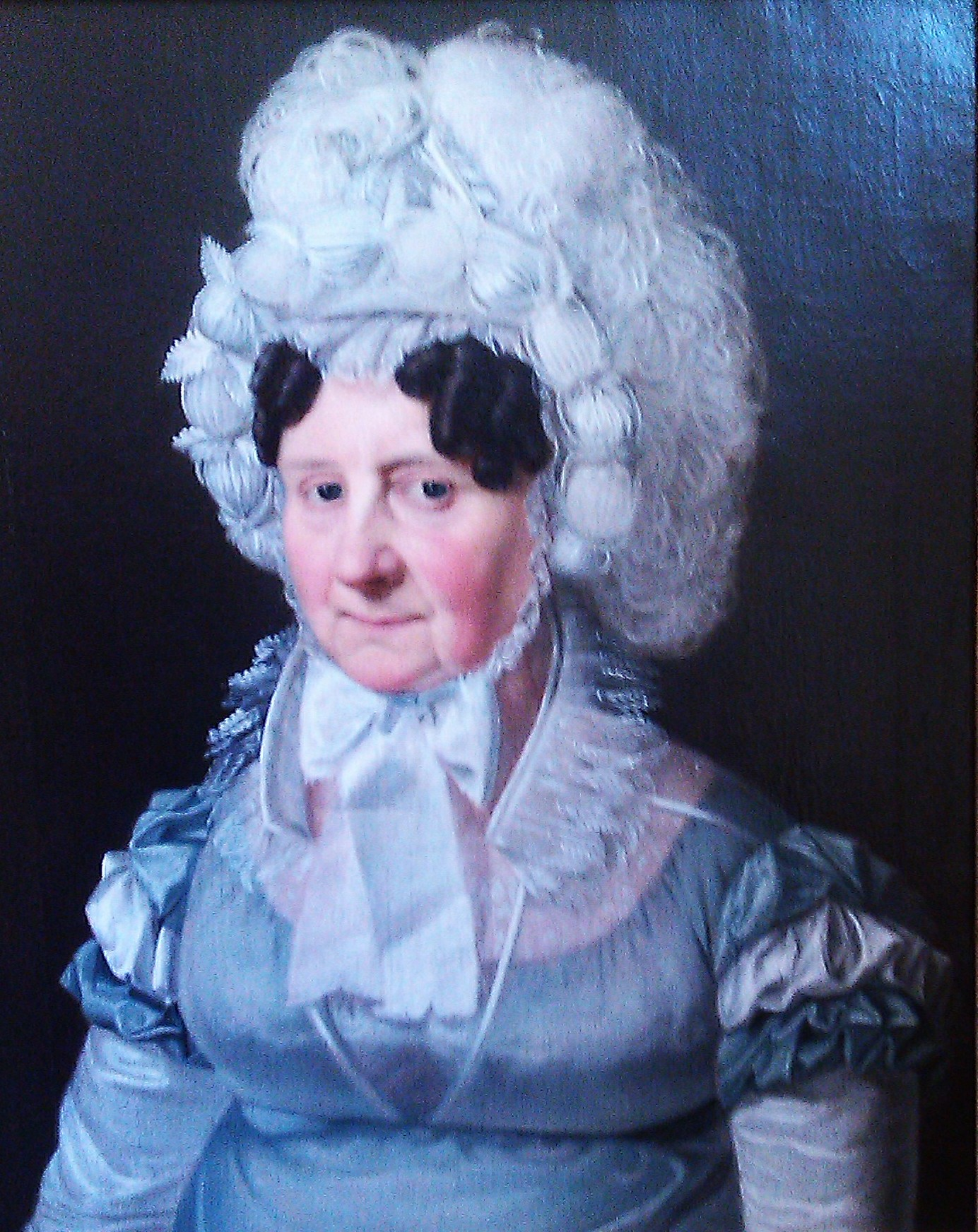
Marie Kofoed

In 1785 it was acquired by Hans Peder Kofoed (1743– 1812), a sea captain from Bornholm. He constructed a large new building fronting the street, probably to designs by the architect Georg Erdman Rosenberg.

Kofoed lived in the building with his wife, Marie Kofoed (1760–1838), and an adopted son from Saint Croix.

When Marie Kofoed became a widow in 1812, she involved herself in philanthropic work in the local community, supporting unmarried women and widows of seamen financially, and continued to live in the house until her own death in 1838.

=== The Heering era ===
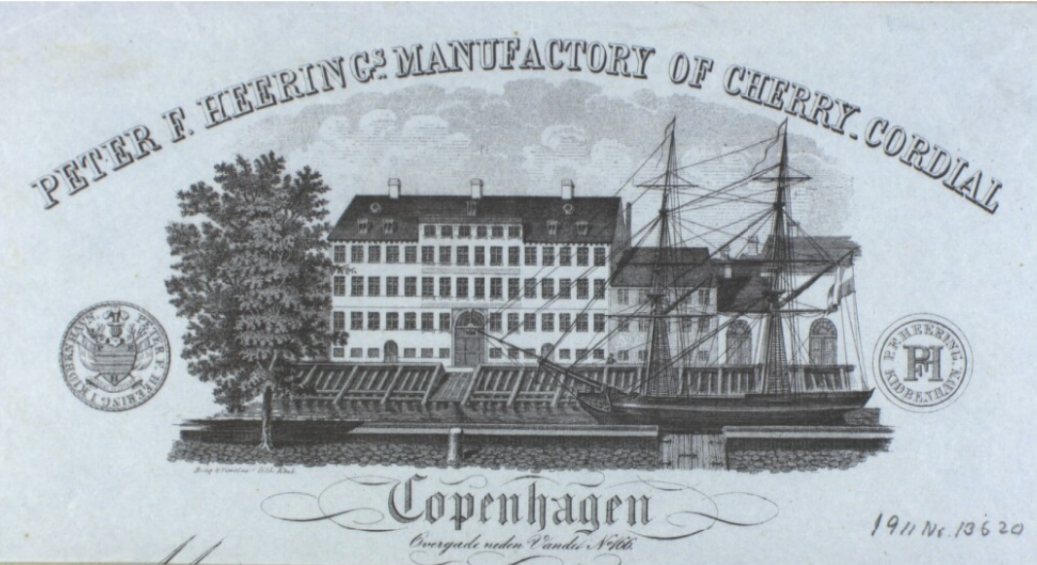
Advertisement for Peter Heering's Manufactory of Cherry-Cordial from 1857

The house was then purchased by Peter Frederik Suhm Heering who needed more space for his expanding business enterprises. He had begun a production of Cherry Heering liqueur in 1818 which had gained world-wide success. In 1833 he had also made a move into shipping, acquiring a schooner built in Svaneke on Bornholm. By 1858, his company, Heering Line, operated a fleet of ten merchant ships which sailed to South America and the Mediterranean Sea.

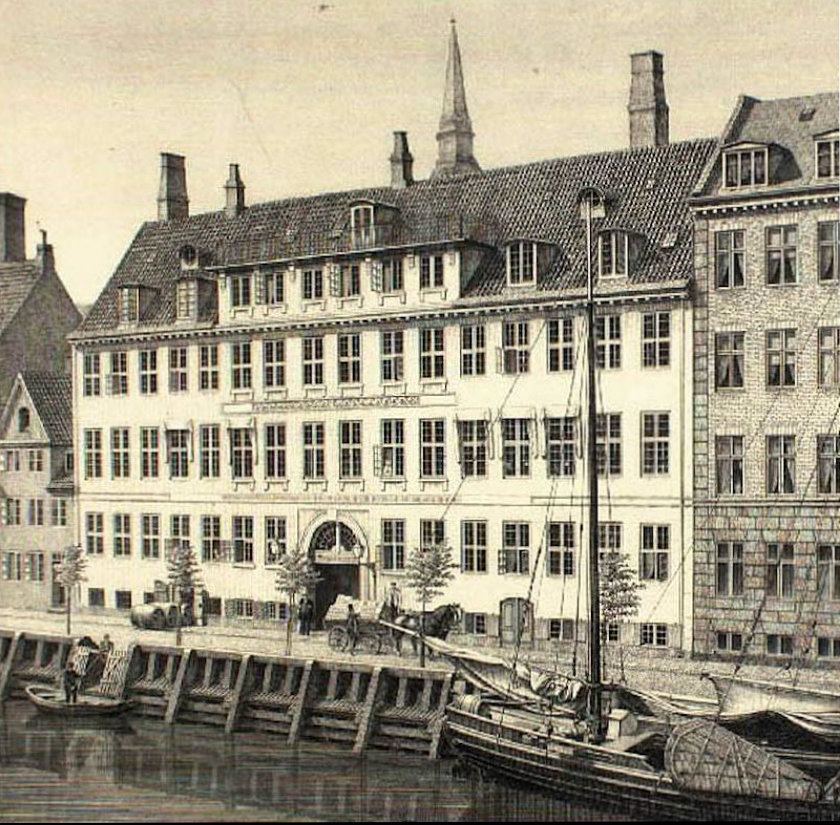
The Heering House in a drawing by Peter Tom-Petersen from c. 1900

After Peter Heering's death in 1875, the property remained in the Heering family for another four generations.

=== Later history ===
In 1977 the property was purchased by the Private Bank (Privatbanken) in 1977. Parts of the building were then rented out to the Danish Ministry of Foreign Affairs. In 1999 the property changed hands once again when it was acquired by the Nordea Foundation. From 2008 to 2011 it underwent a DKK 100 mio. renovation.

== Architecture ==
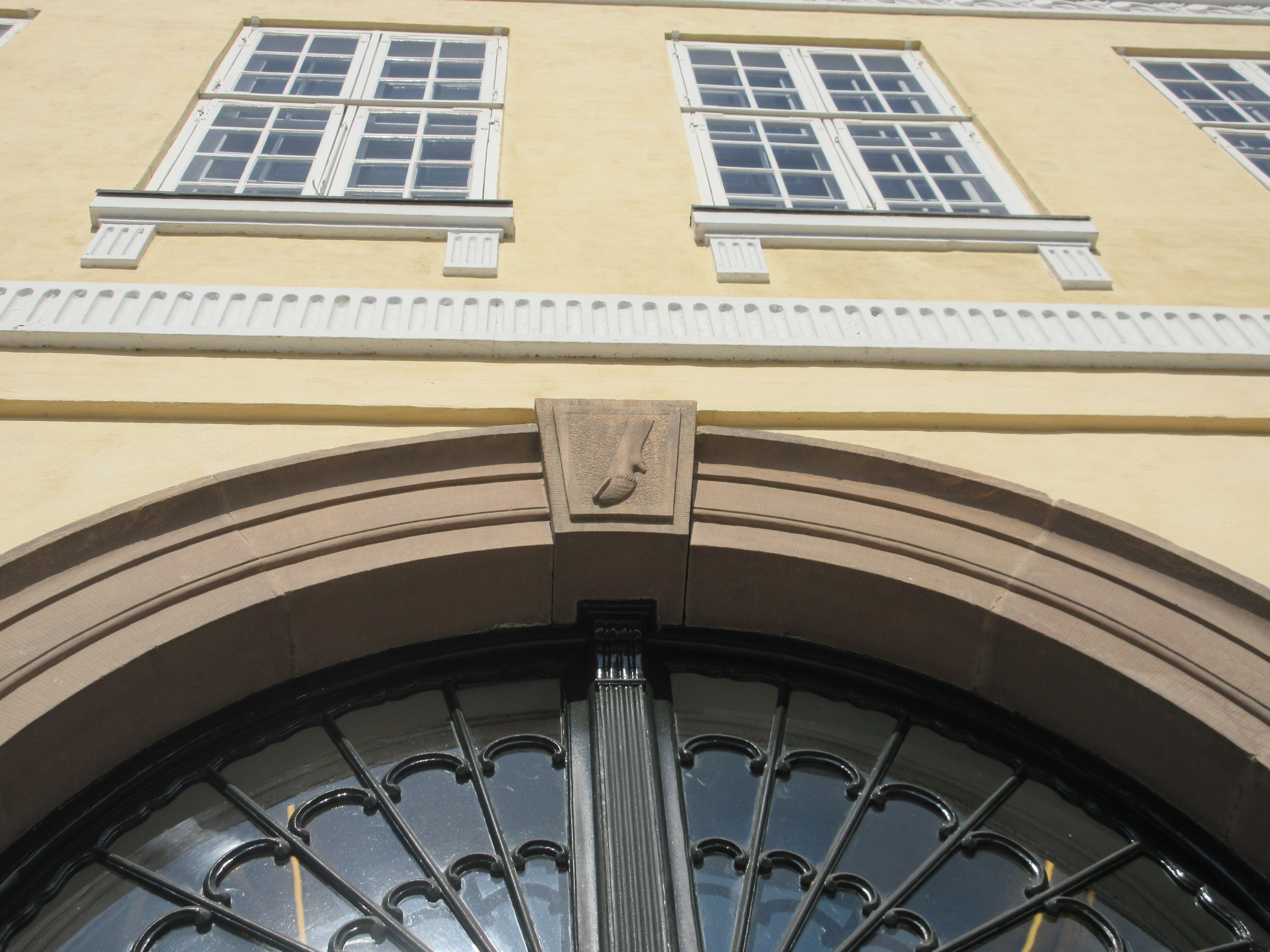
The keystone above the gate, featuring a claw

The main wing towards the street is built in the Neoclassical style. It is 16 bays long and consists of three storeys and a six-bay attica topped by a baluster-balustrade. A sculpted cow's claw on the keystone above the gateway dates from the first owner of the house, Hans Peder Kofoed, and is a reference to his family name, Kofoed, which translates as "cow's foot" and is a name commonly associated with his native island of Bornholm.

A lateral wing on the rear of the building was added in 1926–1927 to a design by Bent Helweg-Møller (1883-1956). It received an award from the city in 1929. The site also comprises the original brewery building which dates from 1759.

== Nordea Foundation ==
The Nordea Foundation (Nordea-fonden) now has its secretariat in the building. The renovation also installed six residences which are available on grant to foreign researchers and specialists under the foundation's residence program.

== Bank and Saving Museum ==
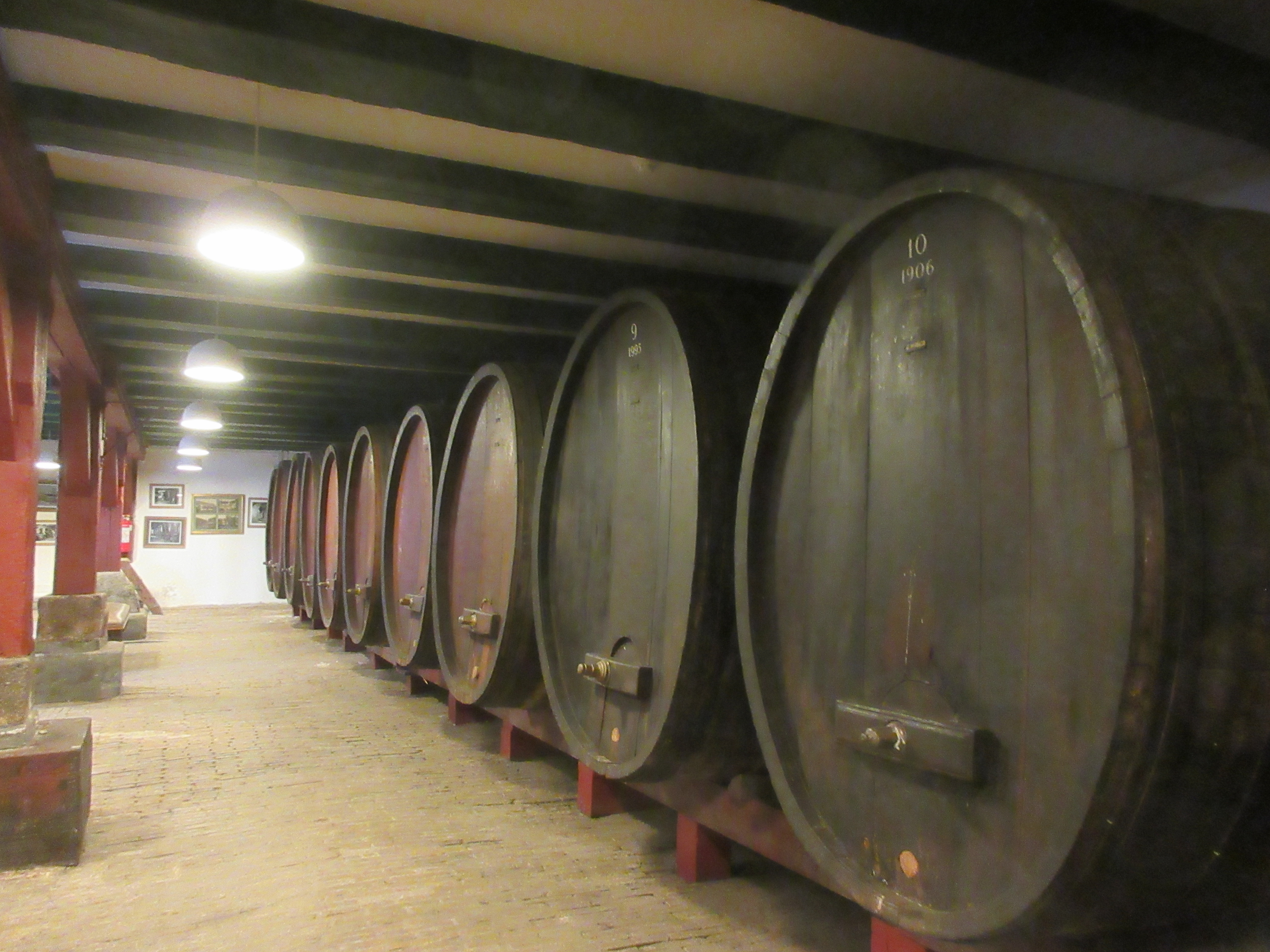
Barrels in the cellar under the main wing

The Bank and Saving Museum (Bank- og Sparekassemuseet) was founded by the Private Bank at Børsen in 1857 to mark the 100-year anniversary of the bank's foundation. The displays include the former office of Carl Frederik Tietgen (1829–1901), the bank's founder and director over four decades, who has also been labelled as the most significant Danish entrepreneur of all time. After his death in 1901, the office was transferred to the bank's new headquarters at C.F. Tietgens Hus on Børsgade and left untouched until the opening of the museum. The museum also features a bank branch, complete with all inventory from c. 1900, and other artifacts from the history of the Danish bank sector. The museum also has a large exhibition space for changing exhibitions in an adjoining building.

== See also ==
- Brøste House
- Stanley House, Copenhagen
