= Martin Bussert =

16th-century Danish sculptor

Martin Bussert or Morten Bussert (birth date unknown, dead after 1552) was a sculptor and Royal Master Builder in Denmark in the early 1500s. His last name is sometimes recorded as "Bossart" or "Bussart".

== Biography ==
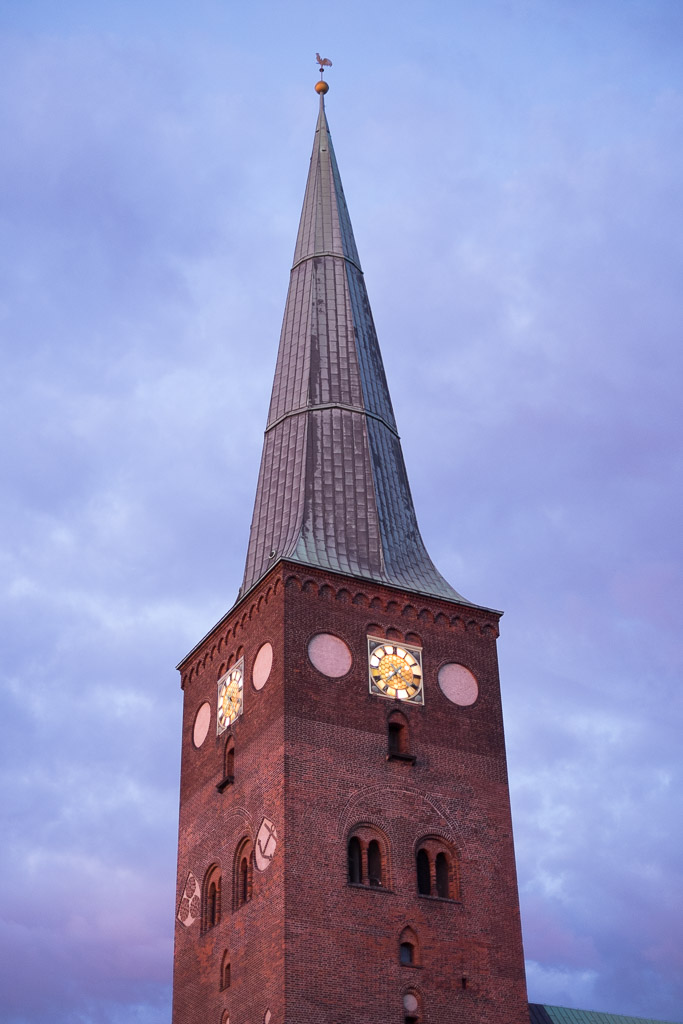
Busserts octagonal spire on Aarhus Cathedral

Bussert's family ties are not known but he was married to daughter of Hans Mikkelsen, mayor of Malmø. When King Christian II was forced from the throne and exiled Hans Mikkelsen stayed loyal and followed the king. Bussert who lived in Copenhagen from 1523 instead pledged his loyalty to Frederik I who secured Bussert's house in the city. The majority of the property of Bussert's in-laws was confiscated. In 1529 the king gave Bussert Slangerup Kloster for life, and Bussert remained loyal to his king through the tumultuous reign. During the siege of Copenhagen in 1535–36 he joined the political party seeking a settlement with Christian III. Bussert attempted to have the confiscated property returned with little success, but was granted the right to manage some of it by Christian III. Bussert is mentioned for the last time on 2 December 1552 and may have died during the plague in Copenhagen in 1553. Slangerup Kloster was given to Bussert's son that year.

== Royal Master Builder ==
Bussert was the Royal Master Builder from the early 1520s and must have worked on some royal projects but his name can only be connected to some works on Copenhagen Castle and buildings connected to it, the new Aalborghus, a spire for Aarhus Cathedral and the drawing for the fortress at Krempe with Jacob Binck in 1550. Some works during this period may have been mistakenly attributed to Bussert. The type of Manor House said to usher in a breakthrough in renaissance architecture in Denmark, such as Hesselagergård, was thought to be works by Bussert, but today it is believed Jacob Brinck may be the true architect. Bussert and Brinck worked together on the fortress at Krempe so a partnership is not improbable.

== Sculptor ==
Bussert is mentioned in early documents as a sculptor. The National Museum of Denmark contains a stone from the Copenhagen castle with a relief of Christian IIs queen Elisabeth from before 1523 is thought to be the work of a young Martin Bussert.

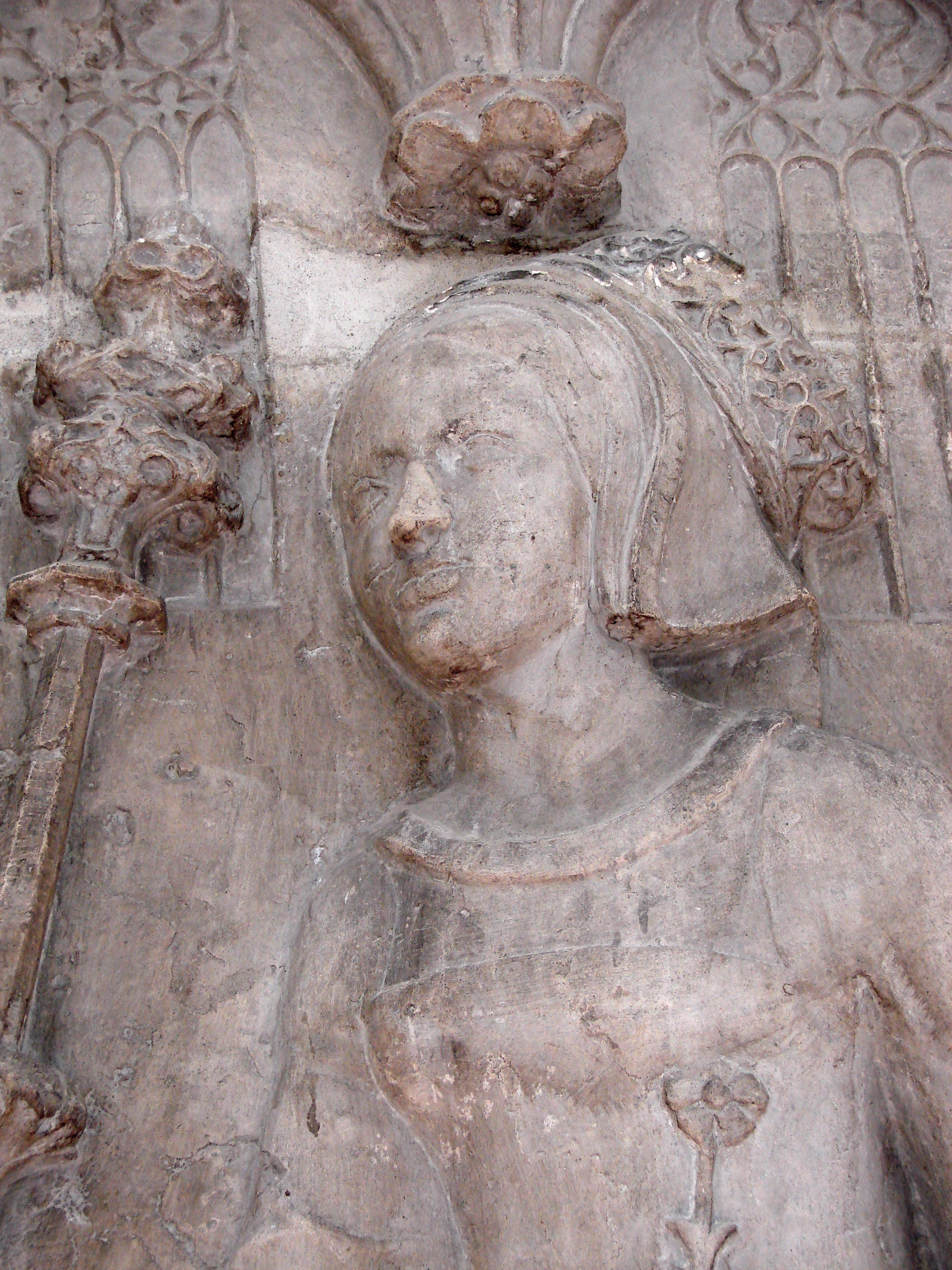
Isabella of Austria.

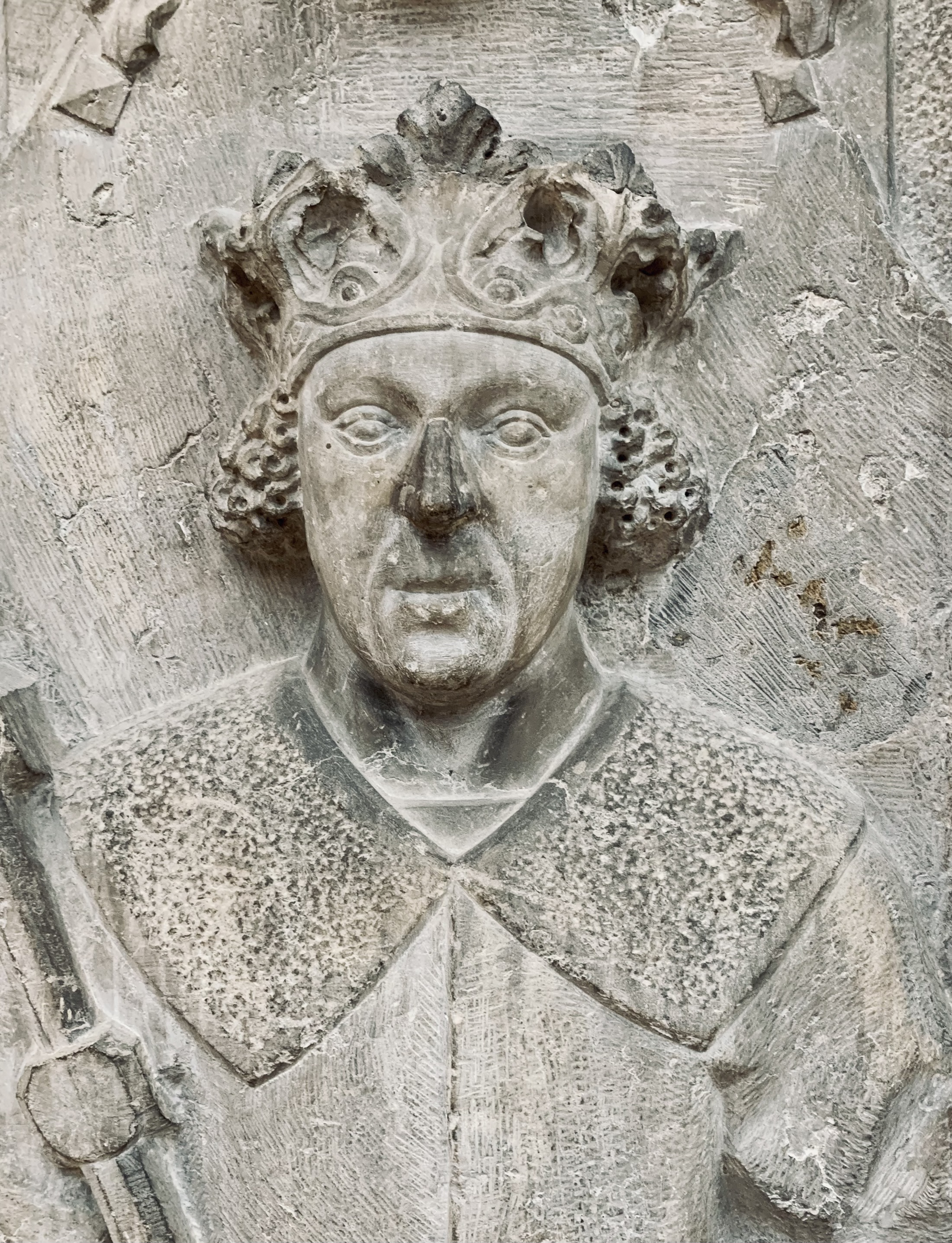
John of Denmark.

== Works ==
- Arbejder ved Københavns Slot (1542)
- His own tombstone (1544, originally in Nikolaj Kirke. Preserved fragment in Museum of Copenhagen.)
- Works at Aalborghus (1547)
- Tøjhus at Copenhagen Castle (1550)
- Drawing to the fortress Krempe in Holsten (1550, with Jacob Binck)
- Spire to west tower, Aarhus Cathedral (paid 1552).
