= Johan Friis =

Danish statesman (1494–1570)

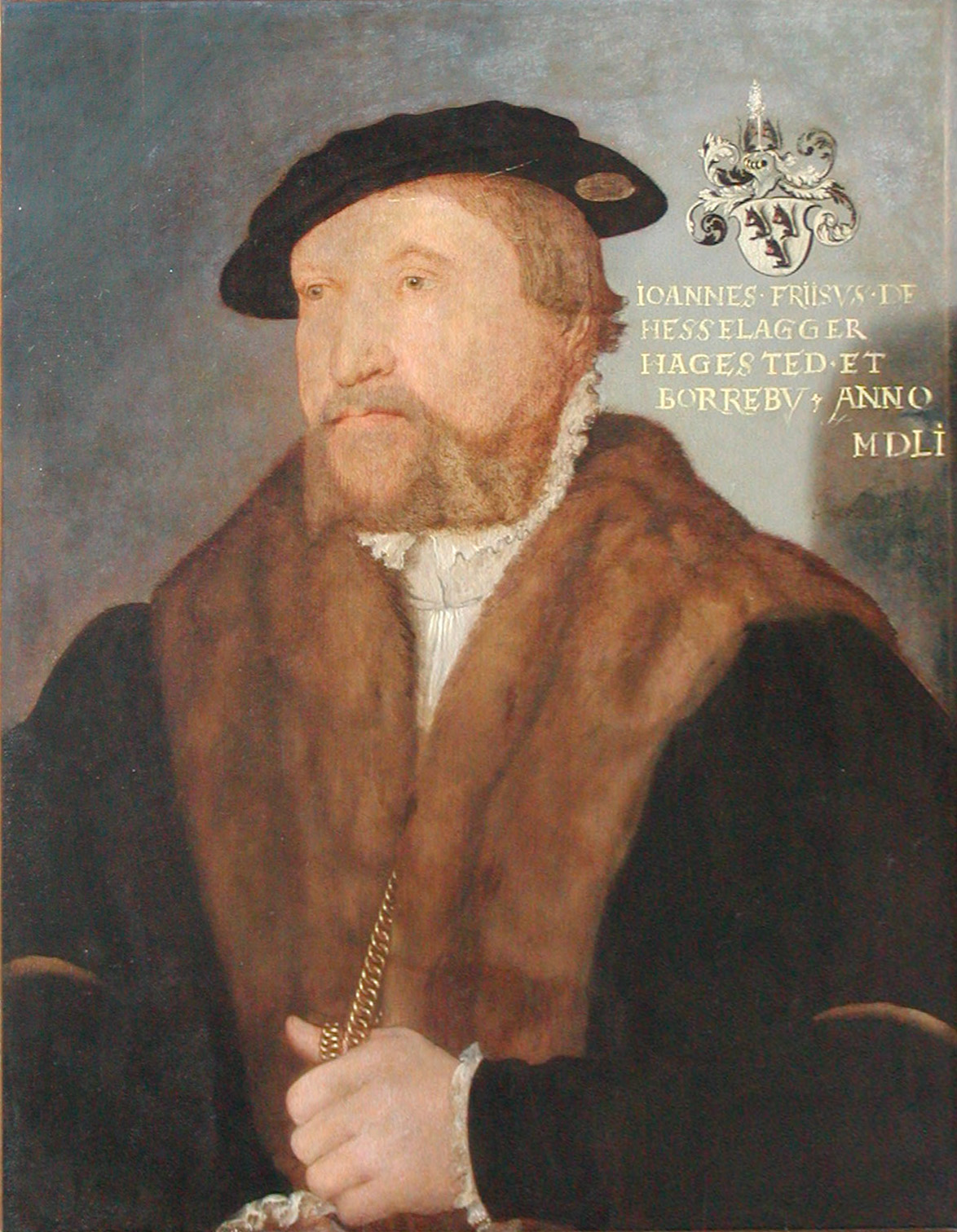
Johan Friis. Painting by Jacob Binck (1551)

Johan Friis (20 February 1494 – 5 December 1570) was a Danish statesman. He served as Chancellor under King Christian III of Denmark.

== Biography ==
He was born at Lundbygård manor as the son of Jesper Friis til Lundbygård and Anne Johansdatter Brockenhuus. He studied in Odense and in Copenhagen before completing his education in Cologne and Rome.

Few among the early modern Danish nobility occupy so prominent a place in Danish history as Johan Friis, who exercised a decisive influence in the government of the realm during the reign of three kings. He was one of the first of the magnates to adhere to the Protestant Reformation and its promoter King Frederick I of Denmark (1523-1533). Friis succeeded Claus Gjordsen as chancellor in 1532, and held that office until his death in 1570.

During the ensuing interregnum at the head of the nobles of Funen and Jutland, he powerfully contributed to the election of King Christian III of Denmark (1533-1559). In the course of the Counts' War, he was taken prisoner by Christopher, Count of Oldenburg, the Roman Catholic candidate for the throne, and forced to do him homage. Subsequently, by judicious bribery he contrived to escape to Germany, and from thence rejoined Christian III.

He was one of the plenipotentiaries who concluded negotiations with Lübeck at the peace in Hamburg during February 1536. He subsequently took an active part in the great work of national reconstruction necessitated by the Reformation, acting as mediator between the Danish and the German parties who were contesting for supremacy during the earlier years of Christian III. This he was able to do, as a moderate Lutheran, whose calmness and common sense contrasted advantageously with the unbridled violence of his contemporaries.

As the first Rector of the reconstructed University of Copenhagen, Friis took the keenest interest in spiritual and scientific matters, and was the first donor of a legacy to the institution. He also enjoyed the society of learned men, especially of those who could talk with him concerning ancient monuments and their history. He encouraged historian Hans Svaning (1503–1584) to complete a continuation of Saxo's history of Denmark (Gesta Danorum) and Anders Vedel to translate Saxo into Danish.

His generosity to poor students was well known. Under King Frederick II of Denmark (1559-1588), who understood but little of state affairs, Friis was well-nigh omnipotent. He was involved in the Scandinavian Seven Years' War (1563–70), which did so much to exacerbate the relations between Denmark and Sweden.

In 1553, possibly somewhat earlier, King Frederick II ceded Borreby Castle on Zealand to Johan Friis. After his death, Borreby was passed to his nephew, Christian Friis. Johan Friis was also the owner of Hesselagergård, a manor on the island Funen. From 1538 to 1550 it was rebuilt in Renaissance style. The estate remained in the Friis family until 1682.

Johan Friis died on 5 December 1570 at Køge, a few days before the peace of Stettin.
