= Hans Diderik Brinck-Seidelin =

Danish Supreme Court justice and landowner

Hans Diderik de Brinck-Seidelin
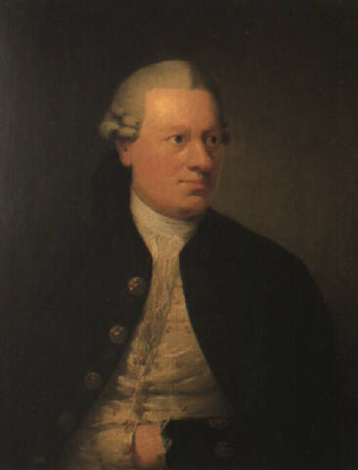
- Brinck-Seidelin painted by Erik Pauelsen
- Born: 1 August 1720; Copenhagen, Denmark
- Died: 5 March 1778 (aged 57); Copenhagen, Denmark
- Occupations: Supreme court justice and landowner

Hans Diderik de Brinck-Seidelin (1 August 1720 – 5 March 1778) was a Danish Supreme Court justice and landowner who was raised to the peerage under the name Brinck-Seidelin in 1753. He owned the estates Hagestedgård (1748–1769), Holbæk Ladegård (1748–1778) and Eriksholm (1762–1778).

== Early life ==
He was born on 1 August in Copenhagen, the son of the Royal confessor (Danish: kongelig confessionarius) Iver Brinck (1665–1728) and Sophie Seidelin (1693–1741). His maternal grandfather was Post Master-General Hans Seidelin.

== Property ==
Brinck-Seidelin's maternal uncle, Hans Hansen Seidelin, had no male heirs. He therefore endowed the estates Hagestedgård and Holbæk Ladegård to Hans Diedrik Brinck-Seidelin with the intention that they be turned into a stamhus (entailed estate or family trust) for future generations of the Seidelin family. Brinck-Seidelin purchased Eriksholm and established Stamhuset Hagested from his now three estates in 1752. He was at the same time ennobled under the name de Brinck-Seidelin. Hagestedgård was, however, with royal approbation, sold to Carl Adolph von Castenschiold in 1769.

== Family ==
On 25 May 1746 in Horsens, Brinck-Seidelin married to Ingeborg Pedersdatter Bering (1727–1796). They had nine children:

- Sophie Brinck (1749–1752)
- Hans Brinck-Seidelin (3 January 1750 – 30 September 1831)
- Elisabeth Cathrine Brinck-Seidelin (1751–1752)
- Sophie Elisabeth Cathrine Brinck-Seidelin (6 September 1752 – 15 June 1820)
- Ivarica Brinck-Seidelin (1754 – 29 April 1826)
- Peder Brinck-Seidelin (1753–1754)
- Petronelle Brinck-Seidelin (24 November 1755 – 1 May 1801)
- Iver Brinck-Seidelin (October 1756 – 1756)
- Iver Brinck-Seidelin (1757–1761)
