= Hagestedgaard =

Historical building in Denmark

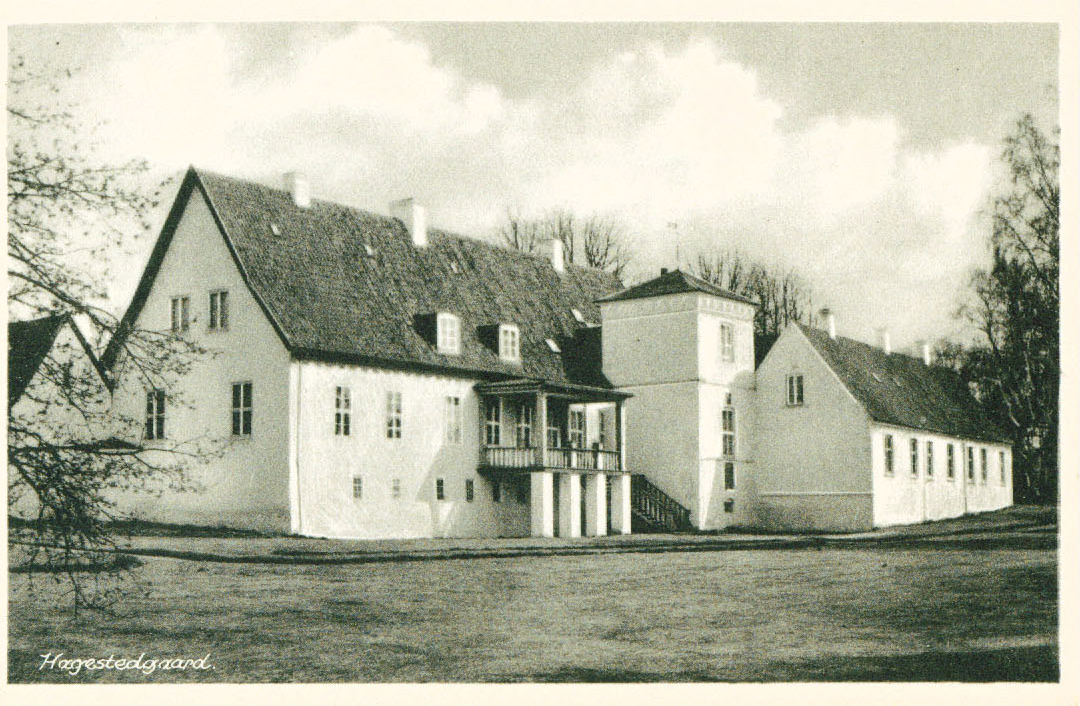

General information
- Architectural style: Neoclassical
- Location: Nykøbingvej 8, 4300 Holbæk, Denmark
- Coordinates: 55°44′45.68″N 11°37′10.72″E
- Completed: 1748

Hagestedgaard is a manor house and estate located at the village of Hagested, near Holbæk, Holbæk Municipality, some 60 kilometres west of Copenhagen, Denmark. The estate traces its history back to the 13th century but the current asymmetrical complex of single-storey, white-washed buildings surrounding a central courtyard was constructed for Hans Didrik Brinck-Seidelin in 1747 with the exception of the remains of a tower built by Johan Friis in 1555. The estate has been owned by members of the Castenskiold family since 1769.

== History ==
=== Early history ===
In the Danish Census Book, Hagested is recorded as crown land. Little is known about the early history of the estate, but it was managed as a fief. The fiefholders (lensmand) included Peder Jensen Pilegrim (1347), Markvard Tiinhuus (1502= and Otte Tiinhuus (1521 and 1540).

=== Friis, Guitfeld and Thott ===
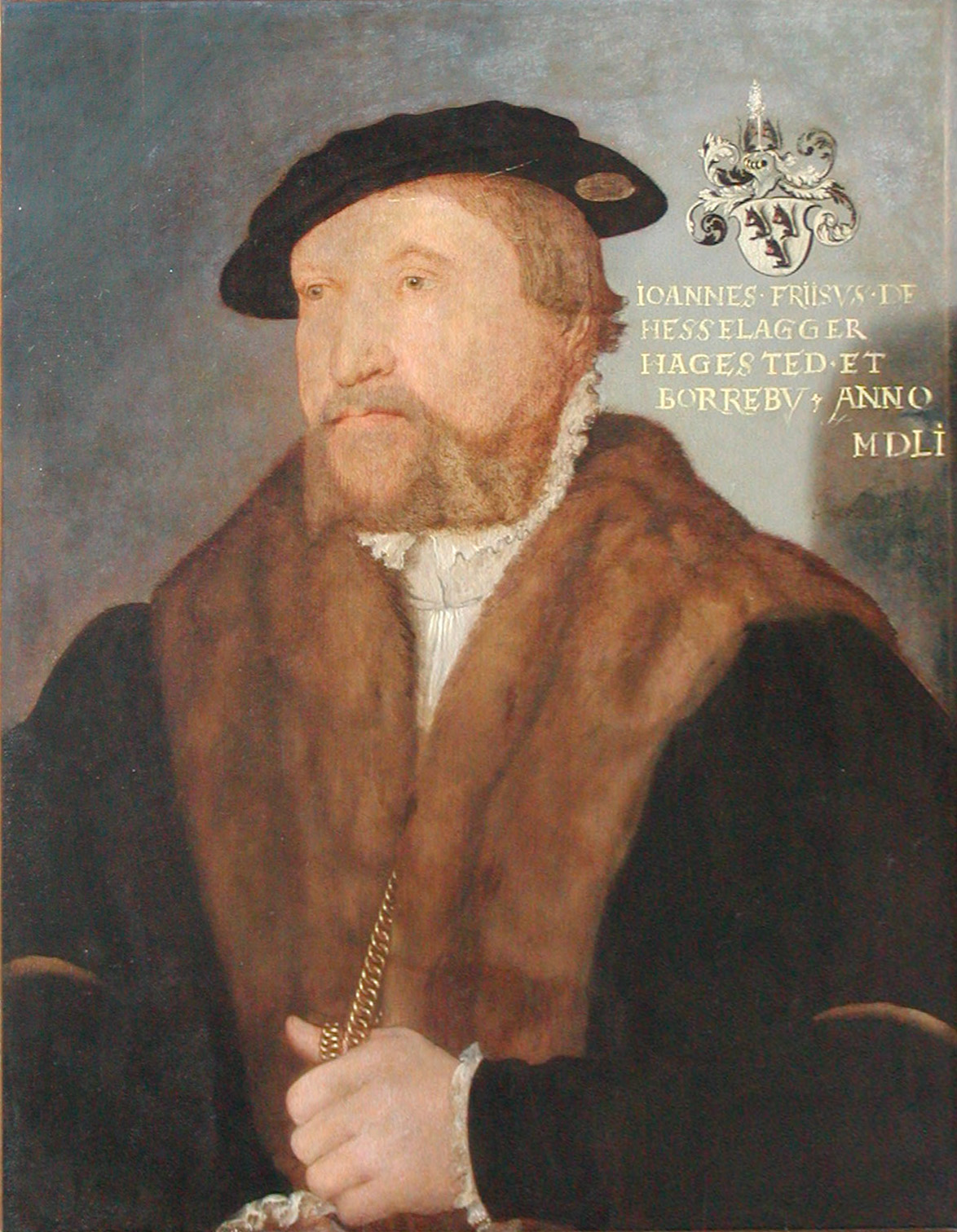
Johan Friis

In 1540, Hagestedgaard was passed to Chancellor Johan Friis in exchange for property in Odsherred. He was also granted jus patronatus of the local Hagested Church.

=== Thomas and Caspar Bartholin, 1658–1704 ===
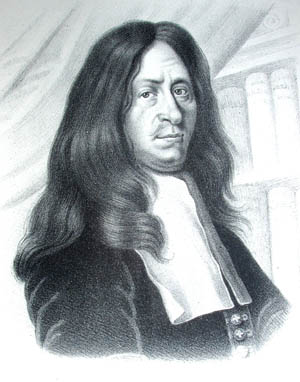
Thomas Bartholin

=== Changing owners, 1704–1740 ===
In 1704, Hagestedgaard was acquired by Ursula von Putbus . She had become a widow after the death of her husband Knud Thott in October 1702. Ole Bornamann (1673-1725), a district judge of Zealand and Møn and the owner of Nørager at Kalundborg, purchased the estate in 1709.

In 1711, Hagestedgaard was sold in public auction. The buyer was Peder Benzon, another district judge. acquired the estate in 1712. He purchased Gjeddesdal from his brother Lars Benzon in 1714 and sold Hagestedgaard to him in 1715. In 1725, Lars Benzon sold Hagestedgaard to civil servant and poet Willum Worm (1698-1737). Just two years later, he sold it to Rachel Sophie Marschalk Fletscher.

=== 1740–1769: The Seidelin family ===
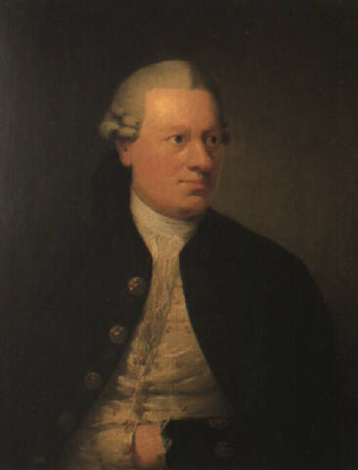
Hans Didrik Brinck-Seidelin

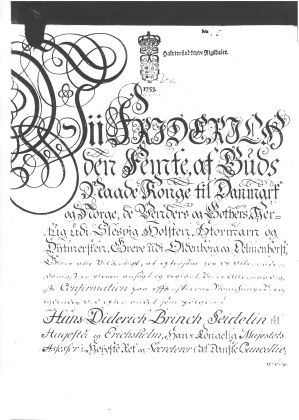
The document which confirms the establishment of the stamhus, dated 12 October 1753.

=== 1769–present: The Castenschiold family ===
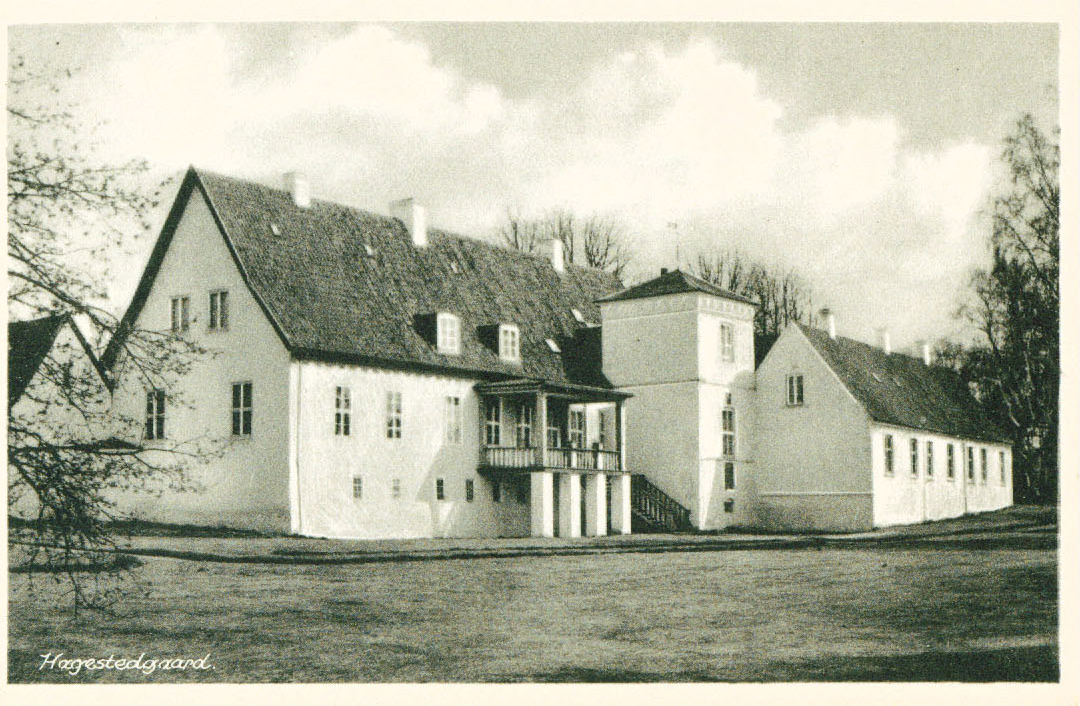
Hagestedgaard in c. 1900

== Architecture ==
Most of the buildings seen today were built for Hans Didrik Brinck-Seidelin in 1748. It is an asymmetrical complex of single-storey, white-washed buildings surrounding a central courtyard. The buildings are built with timber framing on foundations of fieldstone and have roofs clad with winged, red tile.

== See also ==
- Tølløsegård – Manor house in Tølløse, Denmark
