= Marie Kofoed =

Danish businessperson, landowner and philanthropist

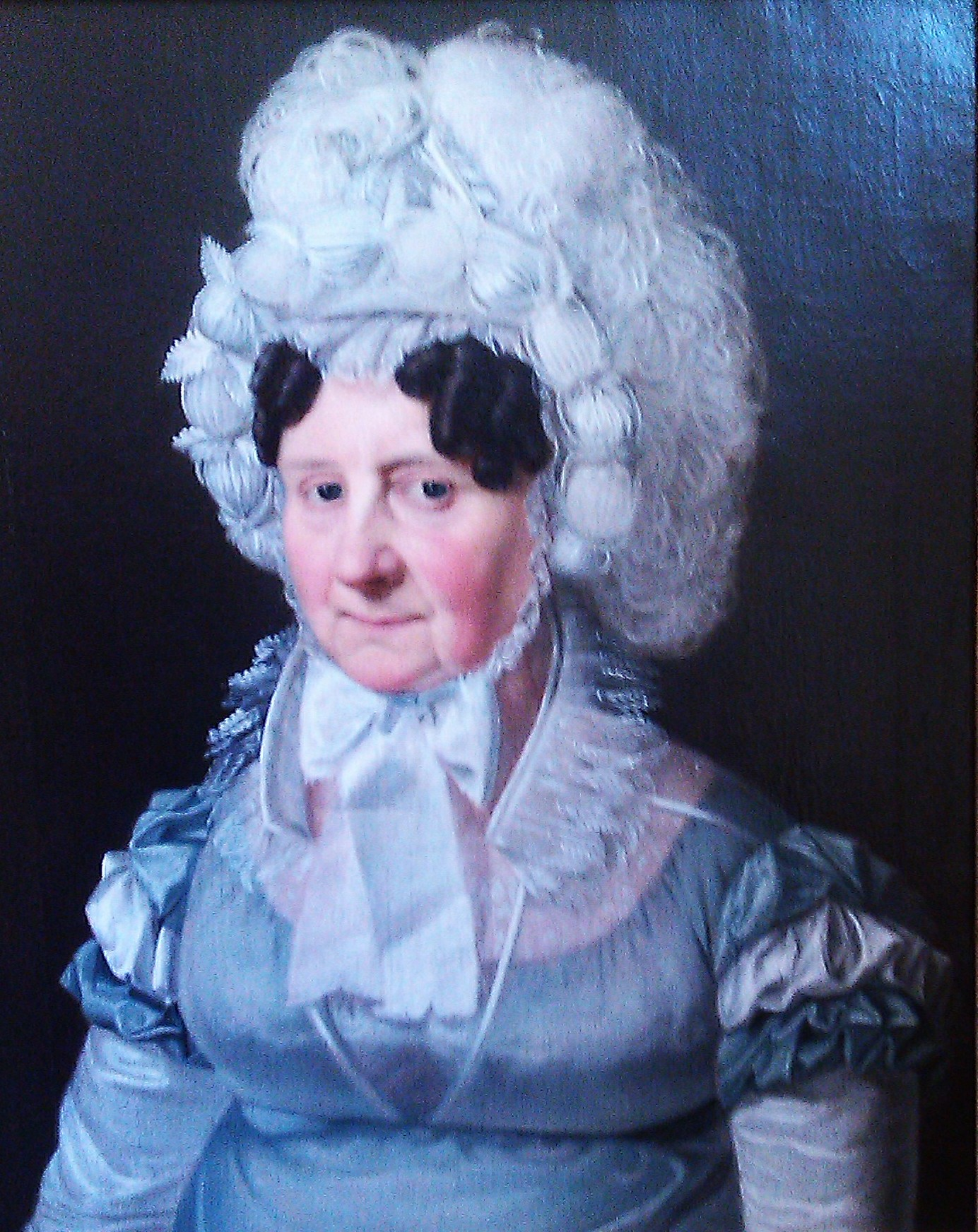
Marie Kofoed

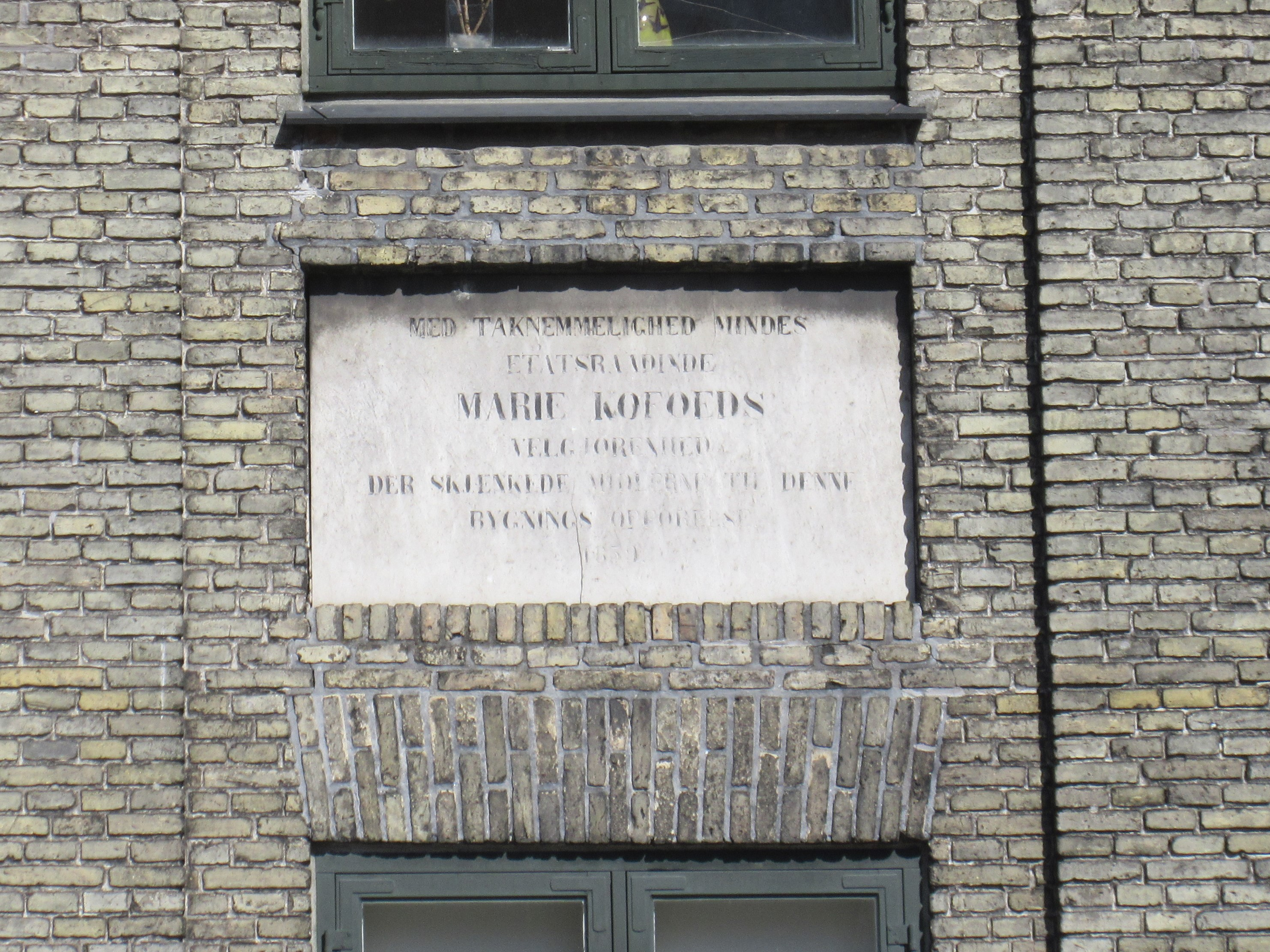
Commemorative plaque at the corner of Sofiegade in Copenhagen

Marie Kofoed, née Bohn (19 January 1760 - 20 April 1838), was a Danish businessperson, landowner and philanthropist. She was a local patriot and played an important part in the history of Bornholm.

== Life ==
Kofoed was born to the businessman Morten Bohn (1719-1802) and Barbara Kirstine Ancher (1725-1771) in Rønne. She married businessman Jochum Herman Ancher (1746-1786) in 1776, and the merchant and landowner Hans Peter Kofoed (1743-1812) in 1786. She belonged to the Bornholm elite by birth and both her marriages.

=== Career ===
After the death of her second spouse, Kofoed managed his affairs and estate and became a major landowner and business person. She both inherited a fortune and expanded it. She spent a great part of her money on charity. Kofoed financed public institutions such as churches, schools and hospitals on Bornholm and Sjælland. She also supported a number of individuals, notably Johan Nicolai Madvig, whose education she paid for. Kofoed had a particular interest in the welfare of sailors and their families in Copenhagen.

=== Legacy ===
In Kofoed's will, she bequeathed large sums to the benefit of sailors and their widows on Bornholm, the widows of officials in Copenhagen, and poor unmarried women. She was known for her social projects. In 1818, Kofoed was awarded with the title of etatsrådinde, a title normally only held by women married to men with the male equivalent and not otherwise granted to women for their own merit.
