= Eriksholm =

Manor house in Holbæk Municipality, Denmark

Eriksholm Castle
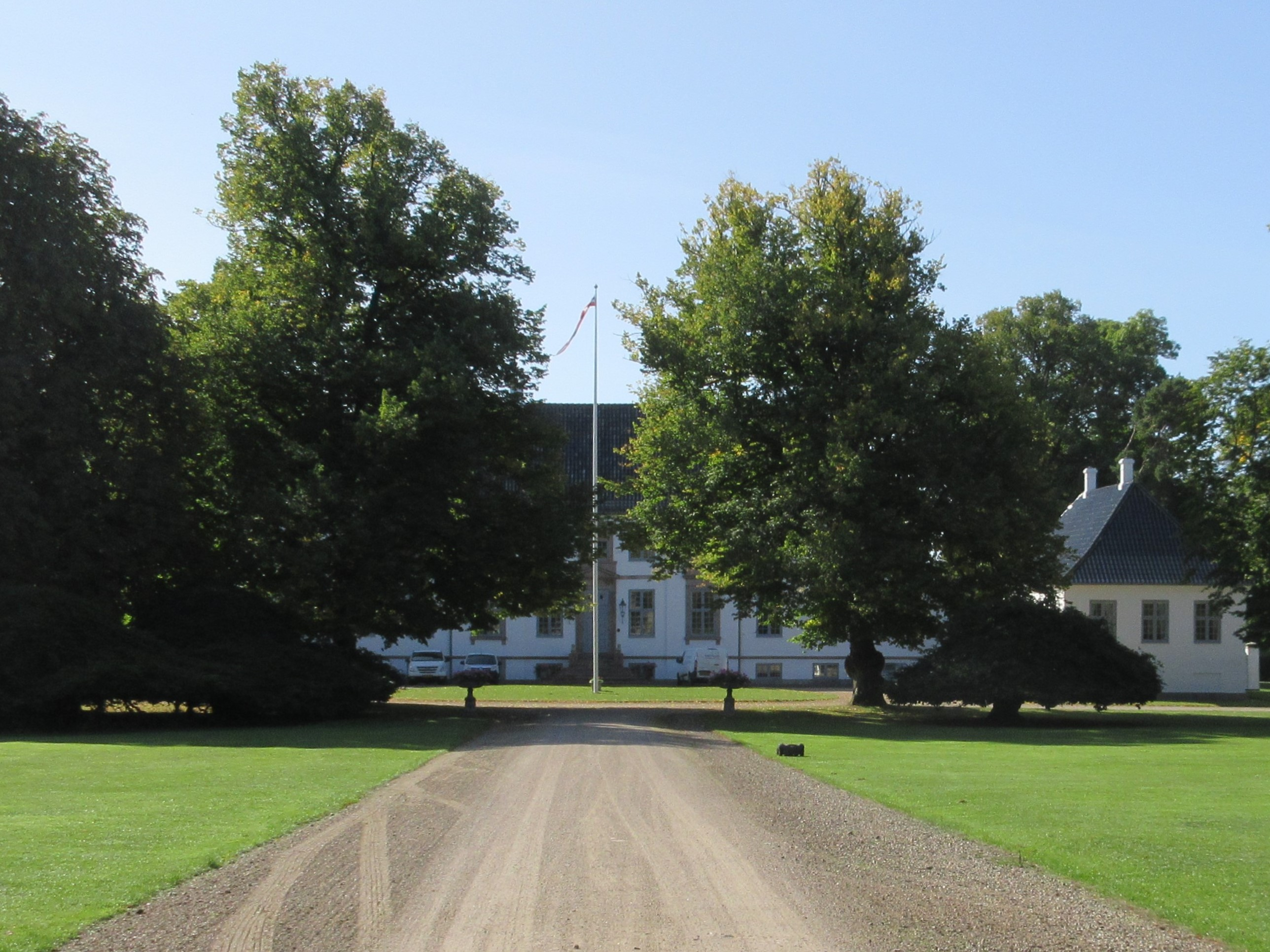
- Eriksholm in 2020
- Interactive map of the Eriksholm Castle area

General information
- Architectural style: Neoclassical
- Location: Holbæk Municipality, Denmark
- Coordinates: 55°40′54.75″N 11°47′35.99″E
- Completed: 1788
- Client: Hans de Brinck-Seidelin (current building)

Design and construction
- Architect: Caspar Frederik Harsdorff

Eriksholm Castle is a manor house located at the foot of the Isefjord inlet, 6 km south-east of Holbæk, in east Denmark. The history of the estate dates back to 1400 but today's house was built in 1788 to a Neoclassical design by Caspar Frederik Harsdorff, the leading Danish architect of the time. It was listed in the Danish registry of protected buildings and places in 1918.

== History ==
=== Vinderup Manor ===
The estate traces its history back to 1400 when it was owned by Peder Jensen and known as Vinderup. It was crown land from 1536 to 1556 and again from 1573 to 1585.

In 1556-1567, Vinderup belonged to Chancellor Johan Friis. On his death, it passed to his sister Karen Friis. She was married to Bjørn Andersen Bjørn. In 1573, Bjørn ceded it to the Crown in exchange for Vitskøl kloster (renamed Bjørnholm=.

=== Vasspyd, Pax and Juel, 1600–1752 ===
In the year 1600 it was acquired by Erik Madsen Vasspyd who constructed a new main building and named it Eriksholm.

In 1682, the estate was acquired by Admiral Niels Iuel in exchange for Sæbygaard. He owned it until his death in 1697 and after that it remained in the possession of his descendants until 1752,

=== Seidelin Family, 1752–1824 ===
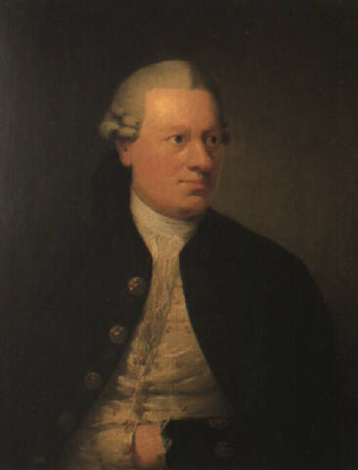
Hans Diderik de Brinck-Seidelin

The new owner was Hans Diderik de Brinck-Seidelin, the owner of nearby Hagestedgaard and Holbæk Ladegård. He created a stamhus (family trust) from his estates and was raised to the peerage under the name Brinck-Seidelin in 1753. His son, who was also named Hans Diderik de Brinck-Seidelin and inherited Eriksholm in 1778, commissioned the architect Caspar Frederik Harsdorff to design a new main building which was completed in 1788.

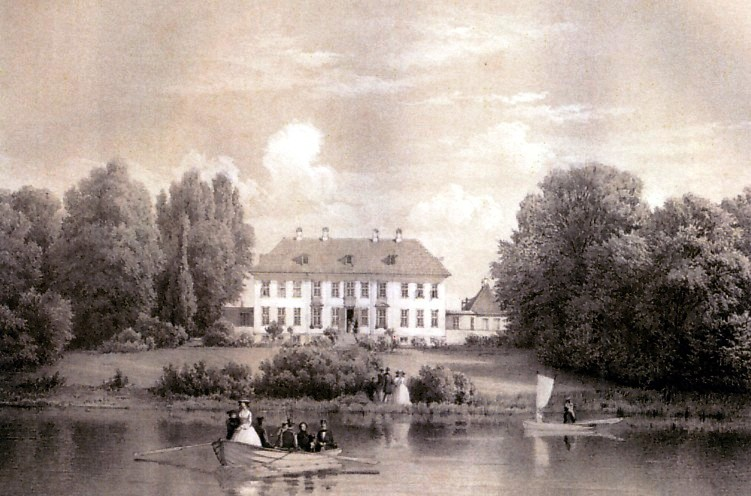
Eriksholm

Brinck-Seidelin was hit by the financially difficult times for the large landowners and Eriksholm was in 1824 sold in public auction to Prime Minister Frederik Julius Falkenskiold Kaas (1758–1827).

=== Later history ===
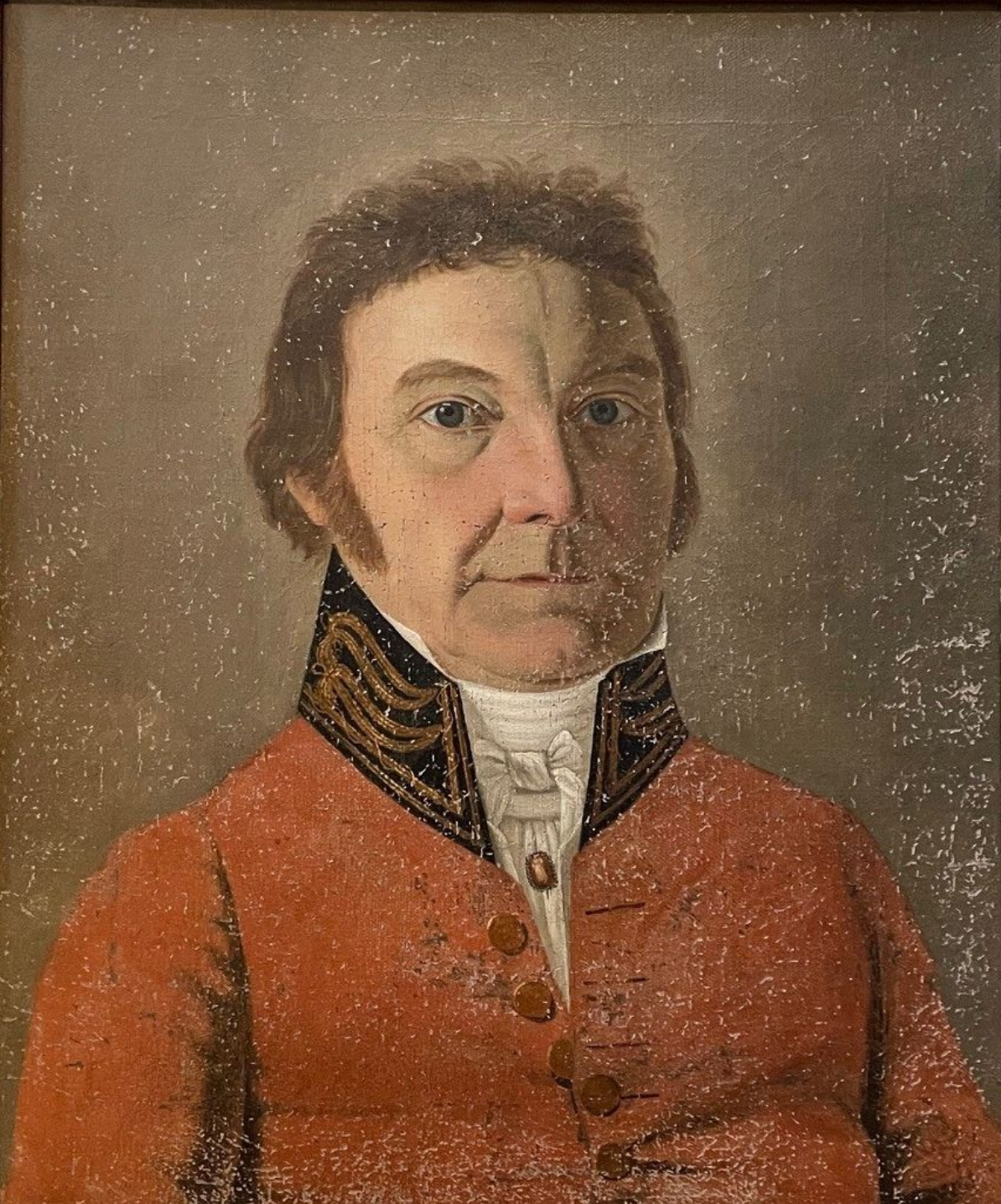
Hans Casper Jacobsen.

In 1878, Frederik Ahlefeldt-Laurvig (1817–1889) bought Eriksholm and immediately passed it on to his son, later Minister of Foreign Affairs William Ahlefeldt-Laurvig. The estate has been in the possession of the Ahlefeldt-Laurvig family ever since.

== Architecture ==
Designed in the Neoclassical style, Eriksholm is built in white-washed brick and consists of three wings under a black-glazed tile roof. The semicircular buildings which connect the main wings to the lower and short lateral wings are typical of the contemporary English Palladianism. The window frames and portals are made of sandstone from Bornholm.

== Eriksholm today ==
The estate covers 335 hectares of farmland and 331 hectares of forest (1995). The main building is rented out for weddings, meetings and other events.

== List of owners ==
- ( – ) Peder Jensen
- (1400– ) Forskellige ejere
- ( –1556) The Crown
- (1556– ) Johan Friis
- ( –1573) Bjørn Andersen Bjørn
- (1573–1583) Kronen
- (1583–1600) Mads Eriksen Vasspyd
- (1600–1615) Erik Madsen Vasspyd
- (1615–1625) Karen Christoffersdatter Pax, gift Vasspyd
- (1625–1650) Christoffer Mogensen Pax
- (1650–1682) Holger Christoffersen Pax
- (1682–1697) Niels Juel
- (1697–1702) Margrethe Ulfeldt, gift Juel
- (1702–1731) Gregers Juel
- (1731–1752) Peder Gregersen Juel
- (1752–1778) Hans Diderik de Brinck-Seidelin
- (1778–1824) Hans Diderik Hansen de Brinck-Seidelin
- (1824–1825) Frederik Julius Falkenskiold Kaas
- (1825–1849) Hans Caspar Jacobsen
- (1849–1857) Christine Frederikke Petronelle Hansen, gift Jacobsen
- (1857–1872) Christian Frederik von Holstein
- (1872–1878) Engelbrethine Marie, gift von Holstein
- (1878) Frederik Ahlefeldt-Laurvig
- (1878–1923) Carl William Ahlefeldt Laurvig
- (1923–1936) Elisabeth Danneskiold-Samsøe, gift Ahlefeldt-Laurvig
- (1936–1972) Kai Frederik Sophus Ahlefeldt-Laurvig
- (1959–1972) Kai Frederik Sophus Ahlefeldt-Laurvig
- (1972–2014) Christian William Ahlefeldt-Laurvig
- (2014– ) JulRas Aps
