= 2021 Svendborg municipal election =

← 2017	16 November 2021	2025 →

All 29 seats to the Svendborg Municipal Council 15 seats needed for a majority
- Turnout: 33,686 (71.0%) ▼3.8pp
	First party	Second party	Third party
	A	V	Ø
Party	Social Democrats	Venstre	Red–Green Alliance
Last election	10 seats, 30.0%	6 seats, 19.2%	3 seats, 11.1%
Seats won	11	7	3
Seat change	▲1	▲1	0
Popular vote	11,897	6,558	3,518
Percentage	35.9%	19.8%	10.6%
Swing	▲5.9%	▲0.6%	▼0.5%
	Fourth party	Fifth party	Sixth party
	C	F	B
Party	Conservatives	Green Left	Social Liberals
Last election	2 seats, 8.0%	1 seat, 3.9%	2 seats, 4.3%
Seats won	3	2	2
Seat change	▲1	▲1	0
Popular vote	3,134	2,470	1,714
Percentage	9.5%	7.4%	5.2%
Swing	▲1.5%	▲3.5%	▲0.9%
	Seventh party	Eighth party
	O	Å
Party	Danish People's Party	The Alternative
Last election	4 seats, 13.9%	1 seat, 3.3%
Seats won	1	0
Seat change	▼3	▼1
Popular vote	1,162	377
Percentage	3.5%	1.1%
Swing	▼10.4%	▼2.2%
Mayor before election
Bo Hansen
Social Democrats
Mayor after election
Bo Hansen
Social Democrats

The incumbent mayor had lost the position after all three elections that had been held in Svendborg Municipality following the 2007 municipal reform.

Bo Hansen from the Social Democrats had become mayor following the last election. He intended to be re-elected following this election.

In the election result, the Social Democrats would be the biggest winners. The whole red bloc would gain 2 seats and lose 1, and with 18 seats, it seemed like an easy path for Bo Hansen to continue. This was later confirmed.

The constitution was agreed between the Social Liberals, the Conservatives, Green Left, Danish People's Party and the Red–Green Alliance. This was remarkbly without Venstre who had become the second largest party.

This was the first time that an incumbent mayor would be re-elected in the municipality since the 2007 municipal reform.

== Electoral system ==
For elections to Danish municipalities, a number varying from 9 to 31 are chosen to be elected to the municipal council. The seats are then allocated using the D'Hondt method and a closed list proportional representation. Svendborg Municipality had 29 seats in 2021

Unlike in Danish General Elections, in elections to municipal councils, electoral alliances are allowed.

== Electoral alliances ==
=== Electoral Alliance 1 ===
Party		Political alignment
H	Helle Wisbech	Local politics
Ø	Red–Green Alliance	Left-wing to Far-Left

=== Electoral Alliance 2 ===
Party		Political alignment
C	Conservatives	Centre-right
I	Liberal Alliance	Centre-right to Right-wing
Q	Borgersammenslutningen	Local politics

=== Electoral Alliance 3 ===
Party		Political alignment
F	Green Left	Centre-left to Left-wing
Å	The Alternative	Centre-left to Left-wing

=== Electoral Alliance 4 ===
Party		Political alignment
M	Vi Lokale Demokrater	Local politics
O	Danish People's Party	Right-wing to Far-right

=== Electoral Alliance 5 ===
Party		Political alignment
B	Social Liberals	Centre to Centre-left
N	Sydfynslisten	Local politics

=== Electoral Alliance 6 ===
Party		Political alignment
D	New Right	Right-wing to Far-right
V	Venstre	Centre-right

== Results by polling station ==
H = Helle Wisbech
J = Den Lunefulde Liste
M = Vi Lokale Demokrater
N = Sydfynslisten
Q = Borgersammenslutningen

Division	A	B	C	D	F	H	I	J	M	N	O	Q	V	Ø	Å
Division	%	%	%	%	%	%	%	%	%	%	%	%	%	%	%
Byen	40.5	5.3	11.1	2.4	6.1	0.4	1.4	0.0	0.0	1.7	2.4	0.3	13.5	13.8	1.0
Nordre	43.5	2.8	7.1	3.0	6.8	0.3	0.9	0.1	0.2	1.5	3.5	0.7	13.3	15.5	0.7
Østre	42.3	4.3	9.0	2.2	5.9	0.6	0.7	0.2	0.1	1.7	3.7	0.2	14.3	14.2	0.6
Bjerreby	33.1	3.3	10.5	4.4	10.9	0.3	0.6	0.0	0.0	7.0	4.7	0.3	19.0	5.3	0.6
Landet	37.9	3.8	10.0	3.8	7.2	0.0	0.8	0.0	0.2	5.5	5.3	0.8	17.8	6.6	0.5
Egense	34.0	6.4	14.3	2.1	7.3	1.3	1.3	0.1	0.0	1.6	2.4	0.5	17.5	10.3	1.0
Drejø	37.0	27.8	1.9	1.9	1.9	0.0	1.9	0.0	0.0	0.0	1.9	0.0	24.1	1.9	0.0
Bregninge	42.1	5.0	15.2	2.8	4.9	0.0	1.5	0.0	0.0	2.0	3.1	0.3	15.2	7.2	0.5
Skårup	34.9	8.4	8.8	3.0	6.0	0.1	0.5	0.1	0.1	3.1	4.9	0.7	19.0	9.5	0.9
Thurø	33.7	9.9	11.9	2.1	5.4	0.1	0.6	0.0	0.2	1.6	4.2	1.0	20.4	8.1	0.7
Tved	46.3	3.0	9.9	3.0	5.4	0.1	0.6	0.1	0.0	2.1	4.3	0.9	17.6	6.4	0.4
Kirkeby	29.3	2.8	3.1	4.8	5.7	0.1	0.9	0.0	0.0	1.7	3.9	0.5	38.5	8.0	0.8
Gudbjerg	21.4	3.4	7.4	4.9	6.9	0.0	0.4	0.0	0.3	0.8	4.3	4.9	38.6	5.6	1.1
V.Skerninge	20.8	4.7	5.0	2.3	24.4	0.5	0.6	0.5	0.0	1.5	3.7	0.2	22.0	11.3	2.4
Stenstrup	34.9	2.2	5.8	3.9	4.7	0.4	0.2	0.1	0.1	2.1	3.8	0.7	34.3	5.6	1.2
Ollerup	22.6	5.2	6.1	1.7	16.4	1.3	1.0	0.2	0.0	1.6	1.9	0.5	19.7	15.0	6.7
Gudme	22.5	3.7	4.2	2.1	7.4	0.0	0.0	0.2	1.5	1.8	4.3	4.6	43.3	3.9	0.5
Hesselager	26.2	3.8	5.8	4.5	5.8	0.1	1.3	0.1	1.6	1.3	5.5	1.9	33.5	7.3	1.2
Oure	20.3	7.8	4.8	2.7	8.0	0.1	0.6	0.1	0.6	2.5	5.3	0.8	37.4	7.9	1.3

== Results ==
Party		Votes	%	+/-	Seats	+/-
Svendborg Municipality
A	Social Democrats	11,897	35.89	+5.88	11	+1
V	Venstre	6,558	19.79	+0.63	7	+1
Ø	Red-Green Alliance	3,518	10.61	-0.51	3	0
C	Conservatives	3,134	9.46	+1.50	3	+1
F	Green Left	2,470	7.45	+3.59	2	+1
B	Social Liberals	1,714	5.17	+0.86	2	0
O	Danish People's Party	1,162	3.51	-10.42	1	-3
D	New Right	899	2.71	New	0	New
N	Sydfynslisten	651	1.96	New	0	New
Å	The Alternative	377	1.14	-2.19	0	-1
I	Liberal Alliance	309	0.93	-1.20	0	0
Q	Borgersammenslutningen	241	0.73	New	0	New
H	Helle Wisbech	131	0.40	New	0	New
M	Vi Lokale Demokrater	52	0.16	New	0	New
J	Den Lunefulde Liste	31	0.09	New	0	New
Total		33,144	100	N/A	29	N/A
Invalid votes		96	0.20	+0.01		
Blank votes		446	0.94	-0.32		
Turnout		33,686	70.95	-3.80		
Source: valg.dk
