= 2025 Svendborg municipal election =

Municipal election in Denmark

← 2021	18 November 2025	2029 →

All 29 seats to the Svendborg municipal council 15 seats needed for a majority
- Turnout: 35,138 (73.3%) ▲2.3%
	First party	Second party	Third party
	A	V	Ø
Party	Social Democrats	Venstre	Red-Green Alliance
Last election	11 seats, 35.9%	7 seats, 19.8%	3 seats, 10.6%
Seats won	10	5	4
Seat change	▼1	▼2	▲1
Popular vote	11,129	5,366	4,407
Percentage	32.3%	15.6%	12.8%
Swing	▼3.6%	▼4.2%	▲2.2%
	Fourth party	Fifth party	Sixth party
	F	C	O
Party	Green Left	Conservatives	Danish People's Party
Last election	2 seats, 7.5%	3 seats, 9.5%	1 seat, 3.5%
Seats won	3	2	2
Seat change	▲1	▼1	▲1
Popular vote	3,512	2,518	2,105
Percentage	10.2%	7.3%	6.1%
Swing	▲2.7%	▼2.2%	▲2.6%
	Seventh party	Eighth party	Ninth party
	B	I	Æ
Party	Social Liberals	Liberal Alliance	Denmark Democrats
Last election	2 seats, 5.2%	0 seats, 0.9%	Did not stand
Seats won	1	1	1
Seat change	▼1	▲1	▲1
Popular vote	1,787	1,582	1,419
Percentage	5.2%	4.6%	4.1%
Swing	▲0.0%	▲3.7%	New
Mayor before election
Bo Hansen
Social Democrats
Mayor after election
Bo Hansen
Social Democrats

The 2025 Svendborg Municipal election was held on November 18, 2025, to elect the 29 members to sit in the regional council for the Svendborg Municipal council, in the period of 2026 to 2029. Bo Hansen from the Social Democrats, would secure re-election.

== Background ==
Following the 2021 election, Bo Hansen from Social Democrats became mayor for his second term. He would run for a third term.

== Electoral system ==
For elections to Danish municipalities, a number varying from 9 to 31 are chosen to be elected to the municipal council. The seats are then allocated using the D'Hondt method and a closed list proportional representation. Svendborg Municipality had 29 seats in 2025.

== Electoral alliances ==
=== Electoral Alliance 1 ===
Party		Political alignment
B	Social Liberals	Centre to Centre-left
F	Green Left	Centre-left to Left-wing
Ø	Red-Green Alliance	Left-wing to Far-Left
Å	The Alternative	Centre-left to Left-wing

=== Electoral Alliance 2 ===
Party		Political alignment
C	Conservatives	Centre-right
D	New Right	Far-right
O	Danish People's Party	Right-wing to Far-right

=== Electoral Alliance 3 ===
Party		Political alignment
I	Liberal Alliance	Centre-right to Right-wing
V	Venstre	Centre-right
Æ	Denmark Democrats	Right-wing to Far-right

== Results by polling station ==
Division	A	B	C	D	E	F	I	J	O	V	Æ	Ø	Å
Division	%	%	%	%	%	%	%	%	%	%	%	%	%
Midtbyhallen	35.4	5.7	8.7	0.5	0.4	9.8	4.6	0.1	4.6	10.6	2.4	16.2	0.9
Nordre	39.5	4.4	4.7	0.6	0.4	10.4	4.2	0.1	7.0	10.2	2.6	15.2	0.8
Østre	36.6	4.8	6.3	0.4	0.2	11.6	3.9	0.1	5.8	11.1	3.2	15.4	0.6
Bjerreby	27.4	4.3	7.1	1.2	1.1	8.1	4.6	0.2	9.3	12.5	13.1	11.1	0.3
Bregninge	38.2	4.6	12.8	0.4	0.2	8.3	5.9	0.1	5.0	10.9	2.6	10.2	0.8
Drejø	33.3	17.9	12.8	0.0	0.0	2.6	10.3	0.0	0.0	2.6	7.7	12.8	0.0
Egense	33.5	5.9	10.2	0.4	0.1	10.0	5.2	0.0	4.8	13.0	2.9	13.0	1.0
Landet	31.3	4.3	7.6	0.8	0.3	6.8	4.1	0.0	9.5	15.1	11.7	8.1	0.3
Skårup	34.4	7.7	5.4	0.6	0.4	6.9	5.4	0.1	8.1	15.0	4.6	10.9	0.5
Thurø	36.1	10.4	10.5	0.2	0.1	8.9	4.6	0.2	5.8	12.0	2.7	7.9	0.5
Tved	40.6	2.1	7.9	0.5	0.3	8.2	3.5	0.1	7.7	16.9	5.7	6.4	0.1
Kirkeby	23.5	2.2	3.4	0.7	1.0	5.7	3.7	0.0	7.4	38.9	4.8	7.7	1.0
Ollerup	19.5	6.6	5.1	0.3	0.1	17.0	4.0	0.2	4.5	15.0	2.8	22.6	2.2
Stenstrup	23.9	2.0	3.9	1.3	0.9	6.0	3.2	0.1	8.1	34.1	8.3	7.5	0.6
V.Skerninge	16.9	3.5	4.3	0.4	0.5	26.6	3.6	0.4	5.0	19.1	3.6	14.2	1.8
Gudbjerg	18.0	3.1	3.1	1.0	0.3	6.1	5.2	0.3	7.9	37.2	8.9	7.8	1.0
Gudme	20.4	4.0	3.4	1.8	0.6	5.1	4.6	0.2	6.6	36.7	8.8	6.8	1.1
Hesselager	22.7	2.0	4.2	0.8	1.2	9.2	5.5	0.0	11.0	24.7	9.5	8.4	0.9
Oure	25.8	5.2	3.7	0.4	0.4	8.8	7.4	0.2	9.0	21.0	4.9	12.4	0.7

== Results ==
Party		Votes	%	+/-	Seats	+/-
Svendborg Municipality
A	Social Democrats	11,129	32.28	-3.62	10	-1
V	Venstre	5,366	15.56	-4.22	5	-2
Ø	Red-Green Alliance	4,407	12.78	+2.17	4	+1
F	Green Left	3,512	10.19	+2.73	3	+1
C	Conservatives	2,518	7.30	-2.15	2	-1
O	Danish People's Party	2,105	6.11	+2.60	2	+1
B	Social Liberals	1,787	5.18	+0.01	1	-1
I	Liberal Alliance	1,582	4.59	+3.66	1	+1
Æ	Denmark Democrats	1,419	4.12	New	1	New
Å	The Alternative	295	0.86	-0.28	0	0
D	New Right	189	0.55	-2.16	0	0
E	Stabilt Demokrati	127	0.37	New	0	New
J	Den Lunefulde Liste	42	0.12	+0.03	0	0
Total		34,478	100	N/A	29	N/A
Invalid votes		87	0.18	-0.02		
Blank votes		573	1.20	+0.28		
Turnout		35,138	73.30	+2.35		
Source: valg.dk

== Opinion polls ==
Polling firm	Fieldwork date	Sample size	A	V	Ø	C	F	B	O	D	Å	I	J	E	Æ	Others	Lead
Epinion	4 Sep - 13 Oct 2025	613	40.8	10.0	11.2	6.7	10.3	3.1	3.7	–	2.6	6.2	–	–	4.8	0.5	29.6
2024 european parliament election	9 Jun 2024		18.6	13.0	9.2	6.3	20.7	5.6	6.1	–	2.5	5.4	–	–	6.6	–	2.1
2022 general election	1 Nov 2022		34.4	9.7	7.0	4.1	8.6	2.8	2.5	3.2	4.0	5.9	–	–	7.5	–	24.7
2021 regional election	16 Nov 2021		28.1	29.2	10.4	6.7	10.4	5.0	3.4	3.5	0.8	1.1	–	–	–	–	1.1
2021 municipal election	16 Nov 2021		35.9 (11)	19.8 (7)	10.6 (3)	9.5 (3)	7.5 (2)	5.2 (2)	3.5 (1)	2.7 (0)	1.1 (0)	0.9 (0)	0.1 (0)	–	–	–	16.1
