= 2018–19 Håndboldligaen =

Håndboldligaen
- Season: 2018-19
- Champions: Aalborg Håndbold
- Relegated: TMS Ringsted
- Champions League: Aalborg Håndbold; GOG Håndbold
- Matches: 182
- Goals: 10,115 (55.58 per match)
- Top goalscorer: (Denmark) Anders Eggert (223 goals)
- Highest scoring: 72 goals: SØN 34–38 TTH
- All statistics correct as of 30 June 2019.

The 2018–19 Håndboldligaen was the 83rd season of the Håndboldligaen, Denmark's premier Handball league. Lemvig-Thyborøn Håndbold and TMS Ringsted were the promoted teams from the 1st Division.

Aalborg Håndbold won the title after beating GOG Håndbold in the final 2–1 in matches. TMS Ringsted was relegated after finishing last in the regular season.

== Team information ==
Locations of the 2018–19 Håndboldligaen

The following 14 clubs compete in the Håndboldligaen during the 2018–19 season:

Team	Location	Arena	Capacity
Aalborg Håndbold	Aalborg	Jutlander Bank Arena	5,009
Aarhus Håndbold	Aarhus	Ceres Arena	5,001
Bjerringbro-Silkeborg	Bjerringbro	Jysk Arena	2,845
GOG	Gudme	SU`VI:T Arena	2,265
KIF Kolding	Kolding	Kolding Hallen	5,182
Lemvig-Thyborøn Håndbold	Lemvig	Arena Vestjylland Forsikring	1,400
Mors-Thy	Nykøbing Mors Thisted	Jyske Bank Mors Arena Thy Hallen	2,296 1,284
Nordsjælland Håndbold	Helsinge; Hillerød	Helsinge-Hallen; FrederiksborgCentret	1,600; 1,100
Ribe-Esbjerg	Esbjerg Ribe	Blue Water Dokken Invactor Arena	3,386 1,976
Skanderborg	Skanderborg	Fælledhallen	2,000
Skjern	Skjern	Skjern Bank Arena	3,264
SønderjyskE	Sønderborg	Skansen	2,200
TMS Ringsted	Ringsted	Ringsted-Hallen	1,600
TTH Holstebro	Holstebro	Idrætscenter Vest	3,250

=== Personnel and kits ===
Following is the list of clubs competing in 2018–19 Håndboldligaen, with their manager, kit manufacturer and shirt sponsor.

Team	President	Head coach	Kit manufacturer	Shirt sponsor
Aalborg Håndbold	Jan Larsen	(Denmark) Stefan Madsen	hummel	Jutlander Bank
Aarhus Håndbold	Henrik Lundorff	(Denmark) Erik Veje Rasmussen	hummel	Sparkassen Kronjylland, Jytas
Bjerringbro-Silkeborg	Frank Lajer	(Denmark) Peter Bredsdorff-Larsen	adidas	Jyske Bank, Grundfos
GOG	Kasper Jørgensen	(Denmark) Nicolej Krickau	Select	Fynske Bank, EnergiFyn
TMS Ringsted	Henrik Dudek	(Denmark) Christian Dalmose	Puma	Borup
KIF Kolding	Jens Boesen	(Denmark) Lars Frederiksen	H2O Sportswear	Jolly Cola, EWII
Mors-Thy Håndbold	Johannes Søndergaard	(Denmark) Søren Hansen	hummel	Jyske Bank
Nordsjælland Håndbold	Jørgen Simonsen	(Denmark) Ian Marko Fog	hummel	GF Forsikring
Ribe-Esbjerg	Holger Refslund	(Denmark) Jan Leslie	hummel	fros
Skanderborg Håndbold	Jens Christensen	(Denmark) Nick Rasmussen	Puma	AVR, Skanderborg kommune
Skjern Håndbold	Henning Kjærgaard	(Denmark) Ole Nørgaard	Puma	Skjern Bank
SønderjyskE	Klaus B. Rasmussen	(Denmark) Kasper Christensen	Diadora	SeaDane Travel
TTH Holstebro	Jørgen S. Hansen	(Finland) Patrick Westerholm	hummel	Vestjysk Bank
Lemvig-Thyborøn Håndbold		(Denmark) Claus Uhrenholt	hummel	Vestjyske Bank

== Regular season ==
=== Standings ===
Pos	Team	Pld	W	D	L	GF	GA	GD	Pts	Qualification or relegation
1	Aalborg Håndbold	26	20	1	5	795	691	+104	41	Championship Play-Off + Advance to Champions League
2	GOG Håndbold	26	19	2	5	768	680	+88	40	Championship Play-Off
3	Bjerringbro-Silkeborg	26	17	3	6	780	719	+61	37	Championship Play-Off
4	TTH Holstebro	26	15	5	6	779	730	+49	35	Championship Play-Off
5	Skjern Håndbold	26	17	0	9	789	710	+79	34	Championship Play-Off
6	Skanderborg Håndbold	26	15	2	9	726	707	+19	32	Championship Play-Off
7	Århus Håndbold	26	13	3	10	722	725	−3	29	Championship Play-Off
8	SønderjyskE Herrer	26	10	3	13	728	740	−12	23	Championship Play-Off
9	Ribe-Esbjerg HH	26	10	3	13	667	702	−35	23	Relegation Play-Off
10	Mors-Thy Håndbold	26	7	3	16	674	693	−19	17	Relegation Play-Off
11	Nordsjælland Håndbold	26	7	3	16	695	740	−45	17	Relegation Play-Off
12	Lemvig-Thyborøn Håndbold	26	5	3	18	673	778	−105	13	Relegation Play-Off
13	KIF Kolding København	26	4	4	18	673	747	−74	12	Relegation Play-Off
14	TMS Ringsted (R)	26	4	3	19	646	753	−107	11	Relegated

Updated to match(es) played on 28 March 2018. Source:
Rules for classification: 1) points; 2) Goal difference; 3) Goals scored.
(R) Relegated

! There's a new relegation playoff made in November 2014

=== Schedule and results ===
Home \ Away	AAL	AAR	BSV	GOG	KIF	LTH	MTH	NSH	REH	SKA	SKJ	SØN	TMS	TTH
Aalborg Håndbold		27–23	33–34	21–21	28–25	36–29	31–22	37–29	24–22	25–29	37–26	29–24	34–25	31–27
Århus Håndbold	26–38		22–33	26–30	28–21	30–18	26–26	31–26	25–23	24–22	23–24	27–26	31–26	31–31
Bjerringbro-Silkeborg	29–28	28–26		19–24	33–30	33–27	27–23	25–25	26–30	29–26	29–33	30–30	32–26	33–37
GOG Håndbold	34–25	32–24	30–31		33–26	28–24	31–26	34–26	32–28	27–30	35–34	30–33	27–24	27–23
KIF Kolding	30–34	25–31	27–27	23–23		34–23	25–28	24–26	20–24	26–26	23–29	29–32	29–27	24–33
Lemvig-Thyborøn Håndbold	23–33	26–32	24–31	23–35	31–31		25–24	26–25	33–28	25–29	25–36	30–27	30–30	30–30
Mors-Thy Håndbold	25–27	30–30	26–29	25–30	30–22	24–27		29–25	29–31	26–22	26–33	23–25	33–22	29–30
Nordsjælland Håndbold	25–29	28–29	23–33	27–30	36–24	29–25	25–23		25–29	30–34	22–26	33–30	28–29	31–32
Ribe-Esbjerg HH	24–30	24–33	31–32	21–28	22–20	29–27	23–23	24–24		25–25	19–30	21–23	28–25	28–25
Skanderborg Håndbold	26–30	35–31	31–27	32–29	33–28	27–25	24–27	25–29	29–28		29–28	25–31	33–22	24–29
Skjern Håndbold	35–31	36–28	33–26	29–30	28–31	30–25	27–24	36–22	23–20	25–27		35–25	36–31	30–37
SønderjyskE Herrer	27–30	27–28	29–35	33–30	32–28	30–21	27–30	24–21	27–29	21–26	25–30		29–25	34–38
TMS Ringsted	22–31	23–29	21–32	20–28	25–26	25–24	24–22	24–27	27–33	23–27	28–24	27–27		22–22
TTH Holstebro	29–36	30–28	24–27	27–30	25–22	32–27	25–21	28–28	34–24	37–30	32–30	30–30	32–23	

Legend: Blue = home team win; Yellow = draw; Red = away team win.

No. 1-8 from the regular season divided into two groups with the top two will advance to the semifinals

== Top goalscorers ==
As of matches played on 4 June 2018

=== Regular season ===
Rank	Player	Club	Goals
1	(Denmark) Anders Eggert	Skjern Håndbold	171
2	(Denmark) Magnus Bramming	TTH Holstebro	166
3	(Denmark) Johan Meklenborg	Nordsjælland Håndbold	148
4	(Denmark) Nikolaj Ø. Nielsen	Bjerringbro-Silkeborg	144
5	(Denmark) Aaron Mensing	SønderjyskE Herrer	143
6	(Denmark) Jóhan Hansen	Bjerringbro-Silkeborg	138
7	(Denmark) Emil Jakobsen	GOG Håndbold	133
8	(Denmark) Nikolaj Læsø	Århus Håndbold	132
9	(Iceland) Ómar Ingi Magnússon	Aalborg Håndbold	129
10	(Denmark) Mads Kjeldgaard Andersen	Mors-Thy Håndbold	127

=== Overall season ===
Rank	Player	Club	Goals
1	(Denmark) Anders Eggert	Skjern Håndbold	223
2	(Denmark) Magnus Bramming	TTH Holstebro	211
3	(Denmark) Nikolaj Ø. Nielsen	Bjerringbro-Silkeborg	207
4	(Denmark) Lasse Møller	GOG Håndbold	197
5	(Denmark) Jóhan Hansen	Bjerringbro-Silkeborg	193
6	(Denmark) Emil Jakobsen	GOG Håndbold	186
7	(Norway) Sebastian Barthold	Aalborg Håndbold	175
8	(Iceland) Ómar Ingi Magnússon	Aalborg Håndbold	196
9	(Norway) Eivind Tangen	Skjern Håndbold	166
10	(Denmark) Nikolaj Læsø	Århus Håndbold	165

== Winner's playoff ==
=== Group 1 ===
Pos	Team	Pld	W	D	L	GF	GA	GD	Pts	Qualification
1	Aalborg Håndbold	6	3	0	3	179	164	+15	8	Advance to semifinals
2	Skjern Håndbold	6	4	0	2	180	155	+25	9	Advance to semifinals
3	TTH Holstebro	6	3	0	3	166	167	−1	6	
4	SønderjyskE Herrer	6	2	0	4	147	186	−39	4	

Rules for classification: 1) points; 2) Goal difference; 3) Goals scored.

Home \ Away	AAL	SØN	SKJ	TTH
Aalborg Håndbold		33–23	34–28	27–28
SønderjyskE Herrer	22–30		19–26	29–28
Skjern Håndbold	35–28	39–22		28–21
TTH Holstebro	28–27	30–32	31–24	

Legend: Blue = home team win; Yellow = draw; Red = away team win.

=== Group 2 ===
Pos	Team	Pld	W	D	L	GF	GA	GD	Pts	Qualification
1	GOG Håndbold	6	4	0	2	177	171	+6	10	Advance to semifinals
2	Bjerringbro-Silkeborg	6	3	1	2	178	177	+1	8	Advance to semifinals
3	Skanderborg Håndbold	6	3	1	2	181	180	+1	7	
4	Århus Håndbold	6	1	0	5	173	181	−8	2	

Rules for classification: 1) points; 2) Goal difference; 3) Goals scored.

Home \ Away	BSV	GOG	AAR	SKA
Bjerringbro-Silkeborg		29–30	32–29	30–30
GOG Håndbold	28–29		32–29	29–26
Århus Håndbold	31–25	26–28		31–32
Skanderborg Håndbold	29–33	32–30	32–27	

Legend: Blue = home team win; Yellow = draw; Red = away team win.

== Playoff ==
=== Semifinal ===
Date			Home team in the 1st match & 3rd match	Home team in the 2nd match	Results		
1st match	2nd match	3rd match	Home team in the 1st match & 3rd match	Home team in the 2nd match	1st match	2nd match	3rd match
22–05–19	26–05–19	-	Aalborg Håndbold	Bjerringbro-Silkeborg	34–32	32–34	-
22–05–19	26–05–19	30–05–19	GOG Håndbold	Skjern Håndbold	28–25	30–31	28–25

! Best of three matches. In the case of a tie after the second match, a third match is played. Highest ranking team in the regular season has the home advantage in the first and possible third match.

=== 3rd place ===
Date			Home team in the 1st match & 3rd match	Home team in the 2nd match	Results		
1st match	2nd match	3rd match	Home team in the 1st match & 3rd match	Home team in the 2nd match	1st match	2nd match	3rd match
02–06–19	05–06–19	-	Bjerringbro-Silkeborg	Skjern Håndbold	32–35	38–32	-

! Best of three matches. In the case of a tie after the second match, a third match is played. Highest ranking team in the regular season has the home advantage in the first and possible third match.

=== Final ===
Date			Home team in the 1st match & 3rd match	Home team in the 2nd match	Results		
1st match	2nd match	3rd match	Home team in the 1st match & 3rd match	Home team in the 2nd match	1st match	2nd match	3rd match
02–06–19	06–06–19	09–06–19	Aalborg Håndbold	GOG Håndbold	30–33	31–31	38–32

! Best of three matches. In the case of a tie after the second match, a third match is played. Highest ranking team in the regular season has the home advantage in the first and possible third match.

== Relegation playoff ==
No. 5 from the relegation playoff and winner, of the playoff match between 2nd and 3rd, from the first division is meet each other for the last seat. The winner stays in the league. the loser relegated to Division 1.

Pos	Team	Pld	W	D	L	GF	GA	GD	Pts	Qualification or relegation
1	Ribe-Esbjerg HH	4	3	0	1	109	100	+9	8	
2	Nordsjælland Håndbold	4	3	0	1	110	110	0	7	
3	Mors-Thy Håndbold	4	2	0	2	108	106	+2	6	
4	Lemvig-Thyborøn Håndbold	4	1	0	3	106	114	−8	3	
5	KIF Kolding (R)	4	1	0	3	113	116	−3	2	Relegation Play-off

Rules for classification: 1) points; 2) Goal difference; 3) Goals scored.
(R) Relegated

Home \ Away	KIF	LTH	MTH	NSH	REH
KIF Kolding				32–35	24–29
Lemvig-Thyborøn Håndbold	28–26		29–22		
Mors-Thy Håndbold	24–31			29–22	
Nordsjælland Håndbold		27–24			26–25
Ribe-Esbjerg HH		30–26	25–24		

Legend: Blue = home team win; Yellow = draw; Red = away team win.

== Number of teams by regions ==
	Region	No. teams	Teams
1	Midtjylland	5	Aarhus Håndbold, Bjerringbro-Silkeborg, HC Midtjylland, Skanderborg Håndbold, Skjern Håndbold, TTH Holstebro
2	Syddanmark	5	KIF Kolding København, GOG, Ribe-Esbjerg HH, SønderjyskE
3	Nordjylland	3	Aalborg Håndbold, Mors-Thy Håndbold, Lemvig-Thyborøn Håndbold
4	Hovedstaden	1	Nordsjælland Håndbold

== Coach of the season ==
(Sweden) Stefan Madsen - Aalborg Håndbold
