= 2007–08 EHF Champions League =

European handball tournament

Tournament details
- Dates: 29 August 2007 - 11 May 2008
- Season: 48th
- Teams: 40
- Defending champions: THW Kiel

Final positions
- Champions: Ciudad Real
- Runners-up: THW Kiel

Tournament statistics
- Scoring leader(s): Kiril Lazarov, Ólafur Stefánsson (96 goals)

The EHF Champions League 2007–08 was the 2007–2008 edition of the EHF Champions League who is managed by EHF. THW Kiel were the reigning champions.

Ciudad Real won the title, beating THW Kiel in the final.

== Qualification round ==
Team 1	Agg.	Team 2	1st leg	2nd leg
Viborg HK (Denmark)	80–45	(Turkey) Beşiktaş JK Istanbul	35–23	45–22
HCM Constanta (Romania)	63–48	(Belgium) KV Sasja HC	31–26	32–22
ABC de Braga-Andebol SAD (Portugal)	54–65	(Spain) FC Barcelona	26–28	28–37
HC Vardar PRO - Skopje (North Macedonia)	67–52	(Estonia) Põlva Serviti	37–22	30–30
Panevezio "Viking Malt" (Lithuania)	43–61	(Iceland) Valur	19–28	24–33
Italgest Casarano (Italy)	57–67	(Austria) A1 Bregenz HB	28–31	29–36
RK Crvena Zvezda Beograd (Serbia)	53–71	(Belarus) HC Meshkov Brest	25–33	28–38

== Group round ==
Key to colours in group tables
Teams that progressed to the Main round
Teams that progressed to the EHF Cup Winner's Cup
Teams eliminated from European competitions for the season

=== Group A ===
Pos	Team	Pld	W	D	L	GF	GA	GD	Pts
1	(Spain) FC Barcelona	6	6	0	0	206	155	+51	12
2	(France) US Ivry Handball	6	3	0	3	170	172	−2	6
3	(Russia) Zarja Kaspija Astrakhan	6	2	1	3	172	170	+2	5
4	(Czech Republic) HC Baník OKD Karvina	7	0	1	6	140	191	−51	1

September 28, 2007
Zarja Kaspija Astrakhan	29–22	US Ivry Handball
September 29, 2007
HC Banik OKD Karvina	20–35	FC Barcelona
October 4, 2007
FC Barcelona	34–27	Zarja Kaspija Astrakhan
October 7, 2007
US Ivry Handball	32–22	HC Banik OKD Karvina
October 11, 2007
FC Barcelona	34–26	US Ivry Handball
Zarja Kaspija Astrakhan	32–25	HC Banik OKD Karvina
November 8, 2007
Zarja Kaspija Astrakhan	30–31	FC Barcelona
November 11, 2007
HC Banik OKD Karvina	26–27	US Ivry Handball
November 17, 2007
FC Barcelona	43–25	HC Banik OKD Karvina
November 18, 2007
US Ivry Handball	36–32	Zarja Kaspija Astrakhan
November 25, 2007
US Ivry Handball	27–29	FC Barcelona
HC Banik OKD Karvina	22–22	Zarja Kaspija Astrakhan

=== Group B ===
Pos	Team	Pld	W	D	L	GF	GA	GD	Pts
1	(Germany) THW Kiel	6	6	0	0	210	169	+41	12
2	(France) Montpellier HB	6	4	0	2	183	169	+14	8
3	(Sweden) Hammarby IF HB	6	1	0	5	184	199	−15	2
4	(Romania) HCM Constanta	6	1	0	5	152	192	−40	2

September 29, 2007
Montpellier HB	32–34	THW Kiel
September 30, 2007
Hammarby IF HB	33–25	HCM Constanta
October 7, 2007
HCM Constanta	23–28	Montpellier HB
THW Kiel	37–28	Hammarby IF HB
October 11, 2007
HCM Constanta	25–29	THW Kiel
October 14, 2007
Montpellier HB	31–29	Hammarby IF HB
November 8, 2007
Hammarby IF HB	36–40	THW Kiel
November 10, 2007
Montpellier HB	34–23	HCM Constanta
November 15, 2007
THW Kiel	32–24	Montpellier HB
HCM Constanta	32–30	Hammarby IF HB
November 22, 2007
THW Kiel	38–24	HCM Constanta
Hammarby IF HB	28–34	Montpellier HB

=== Group C ===
Pos	Team	Pld	W	D	L	GF	GA	GD	Pts
1	(Spain) C.BM. Ademar León	6	4	1	1	171	159	+12	9
2	HC Croatia Osiguranje-Zagreb	6	2	1	3	169	167	+2	5
3	(Switzerland) Kadetten Schaffhausen GCZ	6	2	1	3	179	174	+5	5
4	(North Macedonia) HC Vardar PRO - Skopje	6	2	1	3	161	180	−19	5

September 26, 2007
C.BM. Ademar León	29–25	HC Croatia Osiguranje-Zagreb
September 29, 2007
HC Vardar PRO – Skopje	27–26	Kadetten Schaffhausen GCZ
October 6, 2007
Kadetten Schaffhausen GCZ	29–29	C.BM. Ademar León
October 7, 2007
HC Croatia Osiguranje-Zagreb	28–28	HC Vardar PRO – Skopje
October 10, 2007
C.BM. Ademar León	28–21	HC Vardar PRO – Skopje
October 13, 2007
Kadetten Schaffhausen GCZ	31–27	HC Croatia Osiguranje-Zagreb
November 7, 2007
C.BM. Ademar León	31–30	Kadetten Schaffhausen GCZ
November 10, 2007
HC Vardar PRO – Skopje	26–34	HC Croatia Osiguranje-Zagreb
November 17, 2007
Kadetten Schaffhausen GCZ	36–30	HC Vardar PRO – Skopje
November 18, 2007
HC Croatia Osiguranje-Zagreb	25–26	C.BM. Ademar León
November 24, 2007
HC Croatia Osiguranje-Zagreb	30–27	Kadetten Schaffhausen GCZ
November 25, 2007
HC Vardar PRO – Skopje	29–28	C.BM. Ademar León

=== Group D ===
Pos	Team	Pld	W	D	L	GF	GA	GD	Pts
1	(Spain) Portland San Antonio	6	4	2	0	203	170	+33	10
2	(Denmark) GOG Svendborg TGI Gudme	6	3	2	1	196	181	+15	8
3	(Slovakia) Tatran Prešov	6	1	1	4	182	211	−29	3
4	(Austria) A1 Bregenz	6	1	1	4	172	191	−19	3

September 26, 2007
Portland San Antonio	28–28	GOG Svendborg TGI Gudme
September 29, 2007
Tatran Presov	31–26	A1 Bergenz HB
October 6, 2007
A1 Bergenz HB	29–37	Portland San Antonio
October 7, 2007
GOG Svendborg TGI Gudme	42–32	Tatran Presov
October 10, 2007
Portland San Antonio	40–29	Tatran Presov
October 13, 2007
A1 Bergenz HB	32–26	GOG Svendborg TGI Gudme
November 7, 2007
Portland San Antonio	34–26	A1 Bergenz HB
November 10, 2007
Tatran Presov	31–38	GOG Svendborg TGI Gudme
November 14, 2007
GOG Svendborg TGI Gudme	29–29	Portland San Antonio
November 16, 2007
A1 Bergenz HB	30–30	Tatran Presov
November 24, 2007
Tatran Presov	29–35	Portland San Antonio
November 25, 2007
GOG Svendborg TGI Gudme	33–29	A1 Bergenz HB

=== Group E ===
Pos	Team	Pld	W	D	L	GF	GA	GD	Pts
1	(Germany) HSV Hamburg	6	5	1	0	192	159	+33	11
2	(Russia) Chehovski Medvedi	6	4	1	1	186	155	+31	9
3	(Ukraine) ZTR Zaporizhia	6	1	0	5	144	178	−34	2
4	(Denmark) Viborg HK	6	1	0	5	161	191	−30	2

September 27, 2007
HSV Hamburg	35–26	Viborg HK
September 30, 2007
ZTR Zaporizhia	20–32	Chehovski Medvedi
October 5, 2007
Chehovski Medvedi	26–29	HSV Hamburg
October 6, 2007
Viborg HK	29–23	ZTR Zaporizhia
October 13, 2007
Viborg HK	28–32	Chehovski Medvedi
October 14, 2007
ZTR Zaporizhia	24–28	HSV Hamburg
November 10, 2007
HSV Hamburg	32–32	Chehovski Medvedi
November 11, 2007
ZTR Zaporizhia	35–23	Viborg HK
November 16, 2007
Chehovski Medvedi	28–19	ZTR Zaporizhia
November 17, 2007
Viborg HK	28–30	HSV Hamburg
November 23, 2007
Chehovski Medvedi	36–27	Viborg HK
November 25, 2007
HSV Hamburg	28–23	ZTR Zaporizhia

=== Group F ===
Pos	Team	Pld	W	D	L	GF	GA	GD	Pts
1	(Germany) VfL Gummersbach	6	4	1	1	193	167	+26	9
2	(Slovenia) Celje	6	3	1	2	170	159	+11	7
3	(Hungary) MKB Veszprém KC	6	2	2	2	184	171	+13	6
4	(Iceland) Valur	6	1	0	5	151	201	−50	2

September 28, 2007
Valur	24–33	VfL Gummersbach
September 29, 2007
MKB Veszprém KC	24–24	Celje
October 6, 2007
VfL Gummersbach	32–30	MKB Veszprém KC
Celje	34–24	Valur
October 13, 2007
MKB Veszprém KC	41–28	Valur
October 14, 2007
VfL Gummersbach	32–28	Celje
November 10, 2007
MKB Veszprém KC	35–35	VfL Gummersbach
November 11, 2007
Valur	29–28	Celje
November 18, 2007
Celje	28–23	MKB Veszprém KC
VfL Gummersbach	34–22	Valur
November 22, 2007
Valur	24–31	MKB Veszprém KC
November 24, 2007
Celje	28–27	VfL Gummersbach

=== Group G ===
Pos	Team	Pld	W	D	L	GF	GA	GD	Pts
1	(Spain) Ciudad Real	6	6	0	0	213	153	+60	12
2	(Germany) SG Flensburg-Handewitt	6	3	0	3	179	173	+6	6
3	(Norway) Drammen HK	6	1	1	4	181	200	−19	3
4	(Poland) Zagłębie Lubin	6	1	1	4	161	208	−47	3

September 27, 2007
SG Flensburg-Handewitt	26–34	BM Ciudad Real
September 28, 2007
Zagłębie Lubin	31–32	Drammen HK
October 3, 2007
BM Ciudad Real	40–25	Zagłębie Lubin
October 6, 2007
Drammen HK	30–33	SG Flensburg-Handewitt
October 11, 2007
SG Flensburg-Handewitt	32–33	Zagłębie Lubin
October 14, 2007
Drammen HK	23–29	BM Ciudad Real
November 8, 2007
Zagłębie Lubin	20–37	BM Ciudad Real
November 11, 2007
SG Flensburg-Handewitt	30–28	Drammen HK
November 14, 2007
BM Ciudad Real	29–24	SG Flensburg-Handewitt
November 15, 2007
Drammen HK	33–33	Zagłębie Lubin
November 21, 2007
BM Ciudad Real	44–35	Drammen HK
November 22, 2007
Zagłębie Lubin	19–34	SG Flensburg-Handewitt

=== Group H ===
Pos	Team	Pld	W	D	L	GF	GA	GD	Pts
1	(Hungary) SC Pick Szeged	6	6	0	0	192	134	+58	12
2	(Slovenia) Gorenje	6	4	0	2	173	169	+4	8
3	(Bosnia and Herzegovina) Bosna Sarajevo	6	1	0	5	152	186	−34	2
4	(Belarus) HC Meshkov Brest	6	1	0	5	154	182	−28	2

September 30, 2007
HC Bosna Sarajevo	28–20	HC Meshkov Brest
October 3, 2007
Gorenje	17–29	SC Pick Szeged
October 5, 2007
HC Meshkov Brest	30–36	Gorenje
October 7, 2007
SC Pick Szeged	39–24	HC Bosna Sarajevo
October 13, 2007
HC Meshkov Brest	22–24	SC Pick Szeged
October 14, 2007
RK Gorenje Velenje	30–27	HC Bosna Sarajevo
November 10, 2007
Gorenje	37–28	HC Meshkov Brest
November 11, 2007
HC Bosna Sarajevo	24–37	SC Pick Szeged
November 17, 2007
SC Pick Szeged	30–23	Gorenje
HC Meshkov Brest	30–24	HC Bosna Sarajevo
November 24, 2007
SC Pick Szeged	33–24	HC Meshkov Brest
November 25, 2007
HC Bosna Sarajevo	25–30	Gorenje

== Main round ==
Key to colours in group tables
Team that progressed to the Semi-finals are indicated in **bold type**
Teams eliminated from European competitions for the season are indicated in plain italics

=== Group 1 ===
Pos	Team	Pld	W	D	L	GF	GA	GD	Pts
1	(Germany) THW Kiel	6	5	0	1	191	160	+31	**10**
2	(Russia) Chehovski Medvedi	6	3	0	3	183	176	+7	**6**
3	(Spain) C.BM. Ademar León	6	3	0	3	173	171	+2	**6**
4	(France) US Ivry Handball	6	1	0	5	173	213	−40	**2**

February 8, 2008
**Chehovski Medvedi**	30–28	C.BM. Ademar León
February 10, 2008
**US Ivry Handball**	25–39	THW Kiel
February 16, 2008
**C.BM. Ademar León**	30–22	US Ivry Handball
February 17, 2008
**THW Kiel**	28–25	Chehovski Medvedi
February 24, 2008
**C.BM. Ademar León**	28–24	THW Kiel
**US Ivry Handball**	29–34	Chehovski Medvedi
February 28, 2008
**Chehovski Medvedi**	26–32	THW Kiel
March 2, 2008
**US Ivry Handball**	36–33	C.BM. Ademar León
March 6, 2008
**THW Kiel**	36–30	US Ivry Handball
March 8, 2008
**C.BM. Ademar León**	28–27	Chehovski Medvedi
March 13, 2008
**THW Kiel**	32–26	C.BM. Ademar León
**Chehovski Medvedi**	41–31	US Ivry Handball

=== Group 2 ===
Pos	Team	Pld	W	D	L	GF	GA	GD	Pts
1	(Spain) BM Ciudad Real	6	5	0	1	167	148	+19	**10**
2	(Germany) VfL Gummersbach	6	3	0	3	179	170	+9	**6**
3	(France) Montpellier HB	6	3	0	3	175	179	−4	**6**
4	(Slovenia) Gorenje	6	1	0	5	156	180	−24	**2**

February 9, 2008
**RK Gorenje Velenje**	22–31	BM Ciudad Real
**Montpellier HB**	31–37	VfL Gummersbach
February 16, 2008
**VfL Gummersbach**	33–30	Gorenje
February 17, 2008
**Ciudad Real**	27–24	Montpellier HB
February 20, 2008
**VfL Gummersbach**	27–28	BM Ciudad Real
February 23, 2008
**Gorenje**	33–28	Montpellier HB
March 1, 2008
**Montpellier HB**	28–26	BM Ciudad Real
March 2, 2008
**Gorenje**	21–29	VfL Gummersbach
March 5, 2008
**VfL Gummersbach**	30–25	Montpellier HB
March 9, 2008
**BM Ciudad Real**	30–24	Gorenje
March 15, 2008
**Montpellier**	29–26	Gorenje
March 16, 2008
**Ciudad Real**	25–23	VfL Gummersbach

=== Group 3 ===
Pos	Team	Pld	W	D	L	GF	GA	GD	Pts
1	(Germany) HSV Hamburg	6	3	2	1	187	180	+7	**8**
2	(Spain) Portland San Antonio	6	2	2	2	179	172	+7	**6**
3	HC Croatia Osiguranje-Zagreb	6	3	0	3	170	177	−7	**6**
4	(Germany) SG Flensburg-Handewitt	6	1	2	3	176	183	−7	**4**

February 10, 2008
**HC Croatia Osiguranje-Zagreb**	29–23	Portland San Antonio
**SG Flensburg-Handewitt**	33–33	HSV Hamburg
February 14, 2008
**HSV Hamburg**	32–29	HC Croatia Osiguranje-Zagreb
February 16, 2008
**Portland San Antonio**	30–22	SG Flensburg-Handewitt
February 20, 2008
**HSV Hamburg**	32–29	Portland San Antonio
February 24, 2008
**HC Croatia Osiguranje-Zagreb**	29–25	SG Flensburg-Handewitt
March 2, 2008
**HC Croatia Osiguranje-Zagreb**	27–26	HSV Hamburg
**SG Flensburg-Handewitt**	30–30	Portland San Antonio
March 8, 2008
**HSV Hamburg**	32–30	SG Flensburg-Handewitt
March 9, 2008
**Portland San Antonio**	35–27	HC Croatia Osiguranje-Zagreb
March 15, 2008
**Portland San Antonio**	32–32	HSV Hamburg
March 16, 2008
**SG Flensburg-Handewitt**	36–29	HC Croatia Osiguranje-Zagreb

=== Group 4 ===
Pos	Team	Pld	W	D	L	GF	GA	GD	Pts
1	(Spain) FC Barcelona	6	4	0	2	194	174	+20	**8**
2	(Denmark) GOG Svendborg TGI Gudme	6	3	1	2	184	184	0	**7**
3	(Hungary) SC Pick Szeged	6	3	0	3	169	176	−7	**6**
4	(Slovenia) Celje	6	1	1	4	172	185	−13	**3**

10 February; 15:50	**(Denmark) GOG Svendborg TGI Gudme**	**35–33**	**(Spain) FC Barcelona**	Odense; Attendance: 4,500; Referees: Canbro, Claesson (SWE)
10 February; 15:50	Guðjónsson 7	(14–19)	Romero 8	Odense; Attendance: 4,500; Referees: Canbro, Claesson (SWE)
10 February; 15:50		Report		Odense; Attendance: 4,500; Referees: Canbro, Claesson (SWE)

10 February; 17:15	**(Slovenia) Celje**	**35–30**	**(Hungary) SC Pick Szeged**	Zlatorog Arena, Celje; Attendance: 4,900; Referees: Lemme, Ullrich (GER)
10 February; 17:15	Koksharov 8	(18–13)	Ghionea 8	Zlatorog Arena, Celje; Attendance: 4,900; Referees: Lemme, Ullrich (GER)
10 February; 17:15		Report		Zlatorog Arena, Celje; Attendance: 4,900; Referees: Lemme, Ullrich (GER)

17 February; 15:50	**(Hungary) SC Pick Szeged**	**34–33**	**(Denmark) GOG Svendborg TGI Gudme**	Szeged; Attendance: 3,500; Referees: Bashmak, Frolov (RUS)
17 February; 15:50	Žvižej 9	(15–19)	Hansen 11	Szeged; Attendance: 3,500; Referees: Bashmak, Frolov (RUS)
17 February; 15:50		Report		Szeged; Attendance: 3,500; Referees: Bashmak, Frolov (RUS)

16 February; 17:00	**(Spain) FC Barcelona**	**39–28**	**(Slovenia) Celje**	Palau Blaugrana, Barcelona; Attendance: 4,500; Referees: Reisinger, Kaschütz (AUT)
16 February; 17:00	Romero 9	(20–11)	Koksharov 6	Palau Blaugrana, Barcelona; Attendance: 4,500; Referees: Reisinger, Kaschütz (AUT)
16 February; 17:00		Report		Palau Blaugrana, Barcelona; Attendance: 4,500; Referees: Reisinger, Kaschütz (AUT)

23 February; 16:15	**(Hungary) SC Pick Szeged**	**28–33**	**(Spain) FC Barcelona**	Krešimir Ćosić Hall, Zadar; Attendance: 3,200; Referees: Geipel, Helbig (GER)
23 February; 16:15	Krivokapić 7	(15–14)	Romero 10	Krešimir Ćosić Hall, Zadar; Attendance: 3,200; Referees: Geipel, Helbig (GER)
23 February; 16:15		Report		Krešimir Ćosić Hall, Zadar; Attendance: 3,200; Referees: Geipel, Helbig (GER)

24 February; 15:50	**(Denmark) GOG Svendborg TGI Gudme**	**34–33**	**(Slovenia) Celje**	Odense; Attendance: 2,300; Referees: Cirligeanu, Bejenairu (ROU)
24 February; 15:50	Petersen 10	(18–18)	Koksharov 11	Odense; Attendance: 2,300; Referees: Cirligeanu, Bejenairu (ROU)
24 February; 15:50		Report		Odense; Attendance: 2,300; Referees: Cirligeanu, Bejenairu (ROU)

2 March; 15:50	**(Denmark) GOG Svendborg TGI Gudme**	**28–25**	**(Hungary) SC Pick Szeged**	Gudme-Hallerne, Gudme; Attendance: 1,300; Referees: Stolarovs, Licis (LAT)
2 March; 15:50	Hansen 7	(11–14)	Bajusz 7	Gudme-Hallerne, Gudme; Attendance: 1,300; Referees: Stolarovs, Licis (LAT)
2 March; 15:50		Report		Gudme-Hallerne, Gudme; Attendance: 1,300; Referees: Stolarovs, Licis (LAT)

1 March; 17:00	**(Slovenia) Celje**	**27–33**	**(Spain) FC Barcelona**	Zlatorog Arena, Celje; Attendance: 5,500; Referees: Baum, Goralczyk (POL)
1 March; 17:00	Špiler, Trivundza 5	(12–15)	Nagy 8	Zlatorog Arena, Celje; Attendance: 5,500; Referees: Baum, Goralczyk (POL)
1 March; 17:00		Report		Zlatorog Arena, Celje; Attendance: 5,500; Referees: Baum, Goralczyk (POL)

March 8, 2008
**FC Barcelona**	**29–24**	**GOG Svendborg TGI Gudme**
**SC Pick Szeged**	**20–19**	**Celje**
March 15, 2008
**FC Barcelona**	**28–32**	**SC Pick Szeged**
March 16, 2008
**Celje**	**30–30**	**GOG Svendborg TGI Gudme**

== Semi-finals ==
Team 1	Agg.	Team 2	1st leg	2nd leg
BM Ciudad Real (Spain)	60–59	(Germany) HSV Hamburg	34–27	26–32
THW Kiel (Germany)	78–75	(Spain) FC Barcelona	41–31	37–44

== Final ==
Team 1	Agg.	Team 2	1st leg	2nd leg
Ciudad Real (Spain)	58–54	(Germany) THW Kiel	27–29	31–25

== Top scorers ==
The top scorers from the 2007–08 EHF Champions League are as follows:

#	Name	Team	Goals
1.	(North Macedonia) Kiril Lazarov	HC Croatia Osiguranje-Zagreb	96
1.	(Iceland) Ólafur Stefánsson	(Spain) Ciudad Real	96
3.	(Spain) Iker Romero	(Spain) FC Barcelona	93
4.	(Sweden) Marcus Ahlm	(Germany) THW Kiel	92
5.	(France) Nikola Karabatić	(Germany) THW Kiel	87
6.	(Slovenia) Siarhei Rutenka	(Spain) BM Ciudad Real	85
7.	(South Korea) Yoon Kyung-shin	(Germany) HSV Hamburg	84
8.	(Serbia) Mladen Bojinović	(France) Montpellier HB	78
9.	(France) Luc Abalo	(France) US Ivry Handball	74
10.	(Denmark) Lasse Svan Hansen	(Denmark) GOG Svendborg TGI Gudme	73
10.	(Spain) Cristian Malmagro	(Spain) Portland San Antonio	73
