= Haagen (surname) =

Haagen is a surname of Dutch, Danish, Scandinavian and Germanic origin.

The Danish and Scandinavian origin is from the Old Norse personal name Hákon, probably a compound of hár ‘high’ or a word meaning ‘horse’ + kyn ‘family’ or konr ‘son descendant’. The German origin is a variant of Haag or Haage.

== Notable people ==
- Margarete Haagen (1889–1966), German actress
- Arie Jan Haagen-Smit (1900–1977), Dutch chemist
- Søren Haagen (1974-), Danish handballer
