= Rasmus Lind =

Danish handball player (born 1983)

Personal information
- Full name: Rasmus Schmidt Lind
- Nationality: Danish
- Born: 8 April 1983 (age 43) Struer, Denmark
- Height: 1.92 m (6 ft 4 in)

Sport
- Sport: Handball
- Position: Goalkeeper
- Current club: SG Flensburg-Handewitt
- Number: 31

Senior clubs
- Years: Team
- 2002-2014: TTH Holstebro
- 2015: Ribe-Esbjerg HH
- 2015-2017: TTH Holstebro
- 2017: SG Flensburg-Handewitt
- 2018-: Ribe-Esbjerg HH

Rasmus Lind (born 8 April 1983) is a Danish former handball player.

He played most of his career at TTH Holstebro where he was for 15 years only interrupted for a single season at Ribe-Esbjerg HH in 2014. He played 354 for the TTH Holstebro.

He had initially retired in 2017 to pursue a career as engineer, but came out of retirement when he was contacted by the top Bundesliga club SG Flensburg-Handewitt in the summer 2017, where he signed a 6-month contract to be a back-up to the Swedish player Matias Andersson. Before being contacted by Flensburg-Handewitt his plan was to play part-time handball at the Danish 1st Division club Langhøj KFUM.

After his contract in Germany expired he returned in 2018 to Danish handball to join Ribe-Esbjerg HH. He was however only on a part-time contract to have time to pursue his engineer career.
