= 2006–07 Håndboldligaen (men's handball) =

Danish Handball League
- Season: 2006–07
- Champions: GOG Håndbold 7th title
- Relegated: Lemvig Håndbold
- EHF Champions League: Viborg HK, GOG
- Top goalscorer: (Denmark) Hans Lindberg (187 goals)

The 2006–07 Danish Handball League season was the 71st edition of the Danish Handball League. KIF Kolding were the defending champions.

GOG Svendborg won the title, when they beat Viborg HK in the finals. FCK Håndbold won the regular season. Lemvig Håndbold were relegated, when they finished last in the table.

== League table ==
The regular season was a double round robin. The 4 best teams qualified for the championship playoff, while the last-placed team was relegated. The rest qualified for the relegation playoff.

=== Regular season ===
	Team	P	W	D	L	G+	G−	Pts
1	FCK Håndbold	26	23	0	3	831	684	46
2	KIF Kolding	26	23	0	3	857	707	46
3	GOG	26	20	1	5	856	707	41
4	Viborg HK	26	19	1	6	797	728	39
5	Aarhus GF	26	13	4	9	797	761	30
6	AaB Håndbold	26	12	3	11	781	765	27
7	Skjern Håndbold	26	12	3	11	730	706	27
8	Team Tvis Holstebro	26	11	2	13	734	750	24
9	Fredericia HK	26	10	3	13	665	703	23
10	BSV	26	8	3	15	696	710	19
11	TMS Ringsted	26	5	3	18	659	773	13
12	Ajax København	26	4	4	18	683	817	12
13	Elite 3000	26	3	4	19	654	796	10
14	Lemvig Håndbold	26	2	3	21	651	784	7

Champion Playoff
Relegation Playoff
Relegation

=== Championship Round ===
The championship round was played with two semifinals; one between the 1st and 4th placed and one between the 2nd and 3rd placed teams.

== Semifinals ==
Date	Teams	Result
29 April	KIF Kolding – GOG	34–33
6 May	GOG – KIF Kolding	28–27
12 May	KIF Kolding – GOG	29–30

Date	Teams	Result
28 April	FCK – Viborg HK	26–29
5 May	Viborg HK – FCK	29–27

=== Finals ===
Date	Teams	Result
19 May	GOG – Viborg HK	32–33
24 May	Viborg HK – GOG	32–33
