= Dalgaard =

Dalgaard is a Danish surname. Notable people with the surname include:

- Eluf Dalgaard (1929–2004), Danish cyclist
- Malene Dalgaard (born 1984), Danish handball player
- Peter Dalgaard (born 1959), Danish statistician
- Sebastian Dalgaard (born 1991), Danish football player
- Thomas Dalgaard (born 1984), Danish former football player
