= 2025 EHF Youth Club Trophy =

European handball tournament

EHF Youth Club Trophy
- 2025
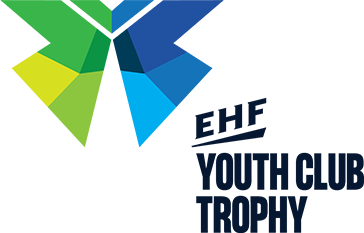

Tournament information
- Sport: Handball
- Dates: 15 April 2025–15 June 2025
- Teams: 16
- Website: www.eurohandball.com

Final positions
- Champions: (Denmark) GOG Håndbold (1st title)
- Runner-up: (Hungary) Veszprém Handball Academy

Tournament statistics
- Matches played: 16
- Goals scored: 1030 (64.38 per match)
- Attendance: 7,541 (471 per match)
- Top scorer(s): (Bosnia and Herzegovina) Alem Hadžić (26 goals)

The 2025 EHF Youth Club Trophy was the 1sth edition of Europe's premier club handball tournament for under-18 teams, running from 15 April to 15 June 2025.

== History ==
Friday 13 December 2024 the EHF Executive Committee confirmed to create a youth club league in Europe in 2025. In 2026 a women's league will follow.

== Teams and venues ==
The map shows the location of the 16 teams. the underlined teams will host a qualification tournament. In Dormagen will be the Final Four.

Semifinals and Third place game		Dormagen; TSV Bayer Sportcenter; Capacity: 3,002
Qualification Tournament 3	2025 EHF Youth Club Trophy is located in Europe	Qualification Tournament 1
Potsdam	2025 EHF Youth Club Trophy is located in Europe	Veszprém
MBS Arena; Capacity: 2,050	2025 EHF Youth Club Trophy is located in Europe	Veszprém Arén; Capacity: 5,340
Qualification Tournament 2	2025 EHF Youth Club Trophy is located in Europe	Qualification Tournament 4
Barcelona	2025 EHF Youth Club Trophy is located in Europe	Bucharest
Ciutat Esportiva Joan Gamper; Capacity: 251	2025 EHF Youth Club Trophy is located in Europe	Dinamo Polyvalent Hall; Capacity: 2,538
Final		Cologne; Lanxess Arena; Capacity: 19,500

== Format ==
13 out of 16 of the clubs of the 2024–25 EHF Champions League and 3 clubs of the 2024–25 EHF European League will play at this tournament. Aalborg Håndbold, Fredericia Håndbold Klub and Kolstad Håndball form the Champions League will not participating and have been replaced by GOG, Vojvodina and IK Sävehof from the European League.

Four qualification tournaments with each four teams from the same region will play a knock out tournament in April. The winners of this tournament will play the Final 4 tournament in June. The Final will be played on Sunday 15 June 2025 in the Lanxess Arena in Cologne before the small and big final of the Champions League Final four.

== Qualification Phase ==
=== Qualification Tournament 1 ===
==== Bracket ====
Semifinals
(Croatia) RK Zagreb	20
(Hungary) SC Pick Szeged	26
(Hungary) Veszprém Handball Academy	48
(Serbia) RK Vojvodina	37

Finals
(Hungary) SC Pick Szeged	30
(Hungary) Veszprém Handball Academy	31
Third place
(Croatia) RK Zagreb	43
(Serbia) RK Vojvodina	41

==== Semifinals ====
15 April 2025; 15:30	RK Zagreb (Croatia)	20-26	(Hungary) SC Pick Szeged	Veszprém Aréna, Veszprém; Attendance: 450; Referees: B. Moncusi Cunillera & J. Moncusi Cunillera (ESP)
15 April 2025; 15:30	Šprem 10	(10-13)	Vincze & Mrdjan 5	Veszprém Aréna, Veszprém; Attendance: 450; Referees: B. Moncusi Cunillera & J. Moncusi Cunillera (ESP)
15 April 2025; 15:30	3× (suspension)	Report	3× (suspension)	Veszprém Aréna, Veszprém; Attendance: 450; Referees: B. Moncusi Cunillera & J. Moncusi Cunillera (ESP)

15 April 2025; 18:00	Veszprém Handball Academy (Hungary)	48-37	(Serbia) RK Vojvodina	Veszprém Aréna, Veszprém; Attendance: 851; Referees: Badea & Sandor (ROU)
15 April 2025; 18:00	Gáncs-Peto 12	(19-20)	Stankov 13	Veszprém Aréna, Veszprém; Attendance: 851; Referees: Badea & Sandor (ROU)
15 April 2025; 18:00	4× (suspension)	Report	3× (suspension)	Veszprém Aréna, Veszprém; Attendance: 851; Referees: Badea & Sandor (ROU)

==== Third place game ====
16 April 2025; 15:30	RK Zagreb (Croatia)	43-41	(Serbia) RK Vojvodina	Veszprém Aréna, Veszprém; Attendance: 354; Referees: B. Moncusi Cunillera & J. Moncusi Cunillera (ESP)
16 April 2025; 15:30	Šprem & Raguž 6	(22-22)	Pavlovic 12	Veszprém Aréna, Veszprém; Attendance: 354; Referees: B. Moncusi Cunillera & J. Moncusi Cunillera (ESP)
16 April 2025; 15:30	4× (suspension) 1× (red card)	Report	2× (suspension)	Veszprém Aréna, Veszprém; Attendance: 354; Referees: B. Moncusi Cunillera & J. Moncusi Cunillera (ESP)

==== Final ====
16 April 2025; 18:00	SC Pick Szeged (Hungary)	30-31	(Hungary) Veszprém Handball Academy	Veszprém Aréna, Veszprém; Attendance: 933; Referees: Badea & Sandor (ROU)
16 April 2025; 18:00	Mrdjan 8	(13-14)	Gáncs-Peto 9	Veszprém Aréna, Veszprém; Attendance: 933; Referees: Badea & Sandor (ROU)
16 April 2025; 18:00	1× (yellow card) 5× (suspension)	Report	6× (suspension)	Veszprém Aréna, Veszprém; Attendance: 933; Referees: Badea & Sandor (ROU)

=== Qualification Tournament 2 ===
==== Bracket ====
Semifinals
(France) U18 – Paris Saint-Germain Handball	34
(Portugal) Sporting CP	31
(Spain) Barça	43
(France) HBC Nantes	27

Finals
(France) U18 – Paris Saint-Germain Handball	28
(Spain) Barça	37
Third place
(Portugal) Sporting CP	29
(France) HBC Nantes	22

==== Semifinals ====
16 April 2025; 18:30	U18 – Paris Saint-Germain Handball (France)	34-31	(Portugal) Sporting CP	Ciutat Esportiva Joan Gamper, Barcelona; Attendance: 177; Referees: L. Bärmann & N. Bärmann (GER)
16 April 2025; 18:30	Omeyer 12	(16-14)	Vasconcelos 8	Ciutat Esportiva Joan Gamper, Barcelona; Attendance: 177; Referees: L. Bärmann & N. Bärmann (GER)
16 April 2025; 18:30	1× (yellow card) 6× (suspension)	Report	1× (yellow card) 2× (suspension)	Ciutat Esportiva Joan Gamper, Barcelona; Attendance: 177; Referees: L. Bärmann & N. Bärmann (GER)

16 April 2025; 21:00	Barça (Spain)	43-27	(France) HBC Nantes	Ciutat Esportiva Joan Gamper, Barcelona; Attendance: 201; Referees: Andela Maloca & Srdanovic (CRO)
16 April 2025; 21:00	Collado Carrión 7	(24-13)	Douglas 8	Ciutat Esportiva Joan Gamper, Barcelona; Attendance: 201; Referees: Andela Maloca & Srdanovic (CRO)
16 April 2025; 21:00	2× (yellow card) 4× (suspension)	Report	3× (suspension)	Ciutat Esportiva Joan Gamper, Barcelona; Attendance: 201; Referees: Andela Maloca & Srdanovic (CRO)

==== Third place game ====
17 April 2025; 18:30	Sporting CP (Portugal)	29-22	(France) HBC Nantes	Ciutat Esportiva Joan Gamper, Barcelona; Attendance: 184; Referees: Andela Maloca & Srdanovic (CRO)
17 April 2025; 18:30	Vasconcelos 20	(16-13)	Gendronneau	Ciutat Esportiva Joan Gamper, Barcelona; Attendance: 184; Referees: Andela Maloca & Srdanovic (CRO)
17 April 2025; 18:30	7× (suspension)	Report	2× (suspension)	Ciutat Esportiva Joan Gamper, Barcelona; Attendance: 184; Referees: Andela Maloca & Srdanovic (CRO)

==== Final ====
17 April 2025; 21:00	U18 – Paris Saint-Germain Handball (France)	28-37	(Spain) Barça	Ciutat Esportiva Joan Gamper, Barcelona; Attendance: 251; Referees: L. Bärmann & N. Bärmann (GER)
17 April 2025; 21:00	Omeyer 6	(15-18)	Collado Carrión & Basterra 8	Ciutat Esportiva Joan Gamper, Barcelona; Attendance: 251; Referees: L. Bärmann & N. Bärmann (GER)
17 April 2025; 21:00	2× (suspension)	Report		Ciutat Esportiva Joan Gamper, Barcelona; Attendance: 251; Referees: L. Bärmann & N. Bärmann (GER)

=== Qualification Tournament 3 ===
==== Bracket ====
Semifinals
(Germany) Füchse Berlin	33
(Sweden) IK Sävehof	31
(Denmark) GOG Håndbold	38
(Germany) SC Magdeburg	36

Finals
(Germany) Füchse Berlin	33
(Denmark) GOG Håndbold	40
Third place
(Sweden) IK Sävehof	31
(Germany) SC Magdeburg	35

==== Semifinals ====
17 April 2025; 13:30	Füchse Berlin (Germany)	33-31	(Sweden) IK Sävehof	MBS Arena, Potsdam; Attendance: 530; Referees: A. Gaard & H. Gaard (FRO)
17 April 2025; 13:30	Nowak 17	(15-13)	Lagerkvist 7	MBS Arena, Potsdam; Attendance: 530; Referees: A. Gaard & H. Gaard (FRO)
17 April 2025; 13:30	1× (yellow card) 4× (suspension)	Report	1× (yellow card) 2× (suspension)	MBS Arena, Potsdam; Attendance: 530; Referees: A. Gaard & H. Gaard (FRO)

17 April 2025; 16:00	GOG Håndbold (Denmark)	38-36	(Germany) SC Magdeburg	MBS Arena, Potsdam; Attendance: 530; Referees: Ludvig & Gal (HUN)
17 April 2025; 16:00	Sørensen 9	(17-18)	Elze & Kleinsteuber 7	MBS Arena, Potsdam; Attendance: 530; Referees: Ludvig & Gal (HUN)
17 April 2025; 16:00	2× (suspension)	Report	4× (suspension)	MBS Arena, Potsdam; Attendance: 530; Referees: Ludvig & Gal (HUN)

==== Third place game ====
18 April 2025; 11:00	IK Sävehof (Sweden)	31-35	(Germany) SC Magdeburg	MBS Arena, Potsdam; Attendance: 640; Referees: A. Gaard & H. Gaard (FRO)
18 April 2025; 11:00	Blomberg Romero 11	(15-20)	Pakebusch 8	MBS Arena, Potsdam; Attendance: 640; Referees: A. Gaard & H. Gaard (FRO)
18 April 2025; 11:00	1× (yellow card) 3× (suspension)	Report	2× (suspension)	MBS Arena, Potsdam; Attendance: 640; Referees: A. Gaard & H. Gaard (FRO)

==== Final ====
18 April 2025; 13:30	Füchse Berlin (Germany)	33-40	(Denmark) GOG Håndbold	MBS Arena, Potsdam; Attendance: 1140; Referees: Ludvig & Gal (HUN)
18 April 2025; 13:30	Kusche 10	(15-18)	Jakobsen 11	MBS Arena, Potsdam; Attendance: 1140; Referees: Ludvig & Gal (HUN)
18 April 2025; 13:30	6× (suspension)	Report	6× (suspension)	MBS Arena, Potsdam; Attendance: 1140; Referees: Ludvig & Gal (HUN)

=== Qualification Tournament 4 ===
==== Bracket ====
Semifinals
(Romania) CS Dinamo București	31
(Poland) Orlen Wisła Płock	28
(Poland) KS Iskra Kielce	29
(North Macedonia) RK Eurofarm Pelister	37

Finals
(Romania) CS Dinamo București	36
(North Macedonia) RK Eurofarm Pelister	37
Third place
(Poland) Orlen Wisła Płock	27
(Poland) KS Iskra Kielce	32

==== Semifinals ====
17 April 2025; 15:30	KS Iskra Kielce (Poland)	29-37	(North Macedonia) RK Eurofarm Pelister	Dinamo Polyvalent Hall, Bucharest; Attendance: 300; Referees: Carmaux & Diar (FRA)
17 April 2025; 15:30	Peczkowicz 6	(11-22)	Hadžić 14	Dinamo Polyvalent Hall, Bucharest; Attendance: 300; Referees: Carmaux & Diar (FRA)
17 April 2025; 15:30	4× (suspension)	Report	3× (suspension)	Dinamo Polyvalent Hall, Bucharest; Attendance: 300; Referees: Carmaux & Diar (FRA)

17 April 2025; 18:00	CS Dinamo București (Romania)	31-28	(Poland) Orlen Wisła Płock	Dinamo Polyvalent Hall, Bucharest; Attendance: 400; Referees: Stylianos Gkogkas & Sachinoglou (GRE)
17 April 2025; 18:00	Stanciu 8	(19-13)	Maryszczyk 13	Dinamo Polyvalent Hall, Bucharest; Attendance: 400; Referees: Stylianos Gkogkas & Sachinoglou (GRE)
17 April 2025; 18:00	4× (suspension)	Report	4× (suspension)	Dinamo Polyvalent Hall, Bucharest; Attendance: 400; Referees: Stylianos Gkogkas & Sachinoglou (GRE)

==== Third place game ====
18 April 2025; 16:30	Orlen Wisła Płock (Poland)	27-32	(Poland) KS Iskra Kielce	Dinamo Polyvalent Hall, Bucharest; Attendance: 200; Referees: Carmaux & Diar (FRA)
18 April 2025; 16:30	Blaszczak 7	(14-14)	Osuch 11	Dinamo Polyvalent Hall, Bucharest; Attendance: 200; Referees: Carmaux & Diar (FRA)
18 April 2025; 16:30	8× (suspension)	Report		Dinamo Polyvalent Hall, Bucharest; Attendance: 200; Referees: Carmaux & Diar (FRA)

==== Final ====
18 April 2025; 18:00	CS Dinamo București (Romania)	36-37	(North Macedonia) RK Eurofarm Pelister	Dinamo Polyvalent Hall, Bucharest; Attendance: 400; Referees: Stylianos Gkogkas & Sachinoglou (GRE)
18 April 2025; 18:00	Stanciu & Domitru 11	(15-18)	Hadžić 12	Dinamo Polyvalent Hall, Bucharest; Attendance: 400; Referees: Stylianos Gkogkas & Sachinoglou (GRE)
18 April 2025; 18:00	1× (suspension)	Report	3× (suspension)	Dinamo Polyvalent Hall, Bucharest; Attendance: 400; Referees: Stylianos Gkogkas & Sachinoglou (GRE)

== Final Four ==
=== Draw ===
The draw was held on 2 May 2025 before the draw of the Champions League Final Four.

=== Bracket ===
Semifinals
(North Macedonia) RK Eurofarm Pelister	21
(Denmark) GOG Håndbold	36
(Spain) Barça	42
(Hungary) Veszprém Handball Academy	43

Finals
(Hungary) Veszprém Handball Academy	28
(Denmark) GOG Håndbold	37
Third place
(Spain) Barça	55
(North Macedonia) RK Eurofarm Pelister	28

=== Semifinals ===
14 June 2025; 9:00	RK Eurofarm Pelister (North Macedonia)	21-36	(Denmark) GOG Håndbold	TSV Bayer Sportcenter, Dormagen
14 June 2025; 9:00	Alem Hadzic, Karlo 4	(12-17)	Emil Darling 8	TSV Bayer Sportcenter, Dormagen
14 June 2025; 9:00	1× (suspension) 1× (red card)	Report	2× (suspension) 1× (red card)	TSV Bayer Sportcenter, Dormagen

14 June 2025; 11:30	Barça (Spain)	42-43	(Hungary) Veszprém Handball Academy	TSV Bayer Sportcenter, Dormagen
14 June 2025; 11:30	Anselmo, Adrian 9	(21-20, 35-35)	János, Zalán 10	TSV Bayer Sportcenter, Dormagen
14 June 2025; 11:30	3× (suspension)	Report	4× (suspension) 1× (red card)	TSV Bayer Sportcenter, Dormagen

=== Third place game ===
15 June 2025; 9:00	(Spain) Barça	55-28	(North Macedonia) RK Eurofarm Pelister	TSV Bayer Sportcenter, Dormagen
15 June 2025; 9:00	Anselmo 11	(26-14)	Alem Hadzic 10	TSV Bayer Sportcenter, Dormagen
15 June 2025; 9:00	2× (suspension)	Report	5× (suspension)	TSV Bayer Sportcenter, Dormagen

=== Final ===
15 June 2025; 11:30	(Denmark) GOG Håndbold	37-28	(Hungary) Veszprém Handball Academy	Lanxess Arena, Cologne
15 June 2025; 11:30	Magnus 9	Report	Four Players 4	Lanxess Arena, Cologne
15 June 2025; 11:30	1× (yellow card) 4× (suspension)		3× (suspension)	Lanxess Arena, Cologne

== Top goalscorers ==
As of 18 April 2025

#	Player	Nat.	Club	Goals
1	Alem Hadžić	Bosnia and Herzegovina	(North Macedonia) RK Eurofarm Pelister	26
2	Leo Nowak	Germany	(Germany) Füchse Berlin	24
3	Máte Gáncs-Peto	Hungary	(Hungary) Veszprém Handball Academy	21
4	Rafael Vasconcelos	Portugal	(Portugal) Sporting CP	20
5	Vukasin Pavlovic	Serbia	(Serbia) RK Vojvodina	19
5	Cosmin Alexandru Stanciu	Romania	(Romania) CS Dinamo București	19
7	Thomas Omeyer	France	(France) U18 – Paris Saint-Germain Handball	18
8	Oskar Møller Jakobsen	Denmark	(Denmark) GOG Håndbold	17
8	Fabian Blomberg Romero	Sweden	(Sweden) IK Sävehof	17
10	Alexandru Cosmin Dumitru	Romania	(Romania) CS Dinamo București	16
10	Maksym Matyszczyk	Poland	(Poland) Orlen Wisła Płock	16

== Broadcasters ==
Country	Channel
Czech Republic	AMC (Sport 1 & Sport 2)
Hungary	AMC (Sport 1 & Sport 2)
Slovakia	AMC (Sport 1 & Sport 2)
Germany	Dyn Media
Romania	TVR
Spain	Barça One & TV3 Catalunya
Rest	EHFTV
