= Søren Haagen =

Danish handball player (born 1974)

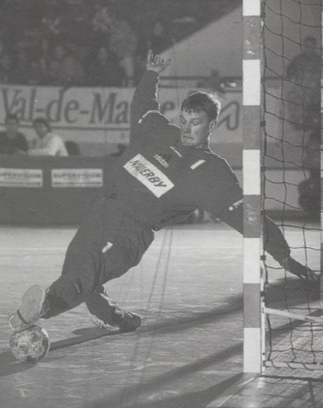
- Søren Haagen in 1994.

Personal information
- Full name: Søren Haagen Andreasen
- Nationality: Danish
- Born: 26 March 1974 (age 52) Esbjerg, Denmark
- Height: 1.87 m (6 ft 2 in)

Sport
- Sport: Handball
- Position: Goalkeeper
- Current club: HØJ Elite

Senior clubs
- Years: Team
- –1998: GOG Svendborg TGI
- 1998–2001: SG Flensburg-Handewitt
- 2001–2002: THW Kiel
- 2002–2004: GOG Svendborg TGI
- 2014–2015: GOG Håndbold
- 2015–2016: Mors-Thy Håndbold
- 2016–2017: Ribe-Esbjerg HH
- 2017–2018: KIF Kolding København
- 2018–2019: Ribe-Esbjerg HH
- 2019–2021: GOG Håndbold
- 2021–2023: HØJ Elite
National team
Years	Team	Apps	(Gls)
1994–2000	Denmark	79	(0)

Søren Haagen Andreasen (born 26 March 1974) is a Danish handballer, who played for HØJ Elite in the Danish 1st division until the end of the 2022/2023 season. In 1996 he was named Danish handballer of the year.

He initially retired as a professional handballer in 2001 at the age of 28, but made a comeback over 10 years later when he signed for Danish club GOG Håndbold.

In 2020 he became the first Danish handballer to play a league match together with his own son, when both he and Andreas Haagen took the field against Mors-Thy Håndbold.
