= Kasper Nielsen =

Danish team handball player (born 1975)

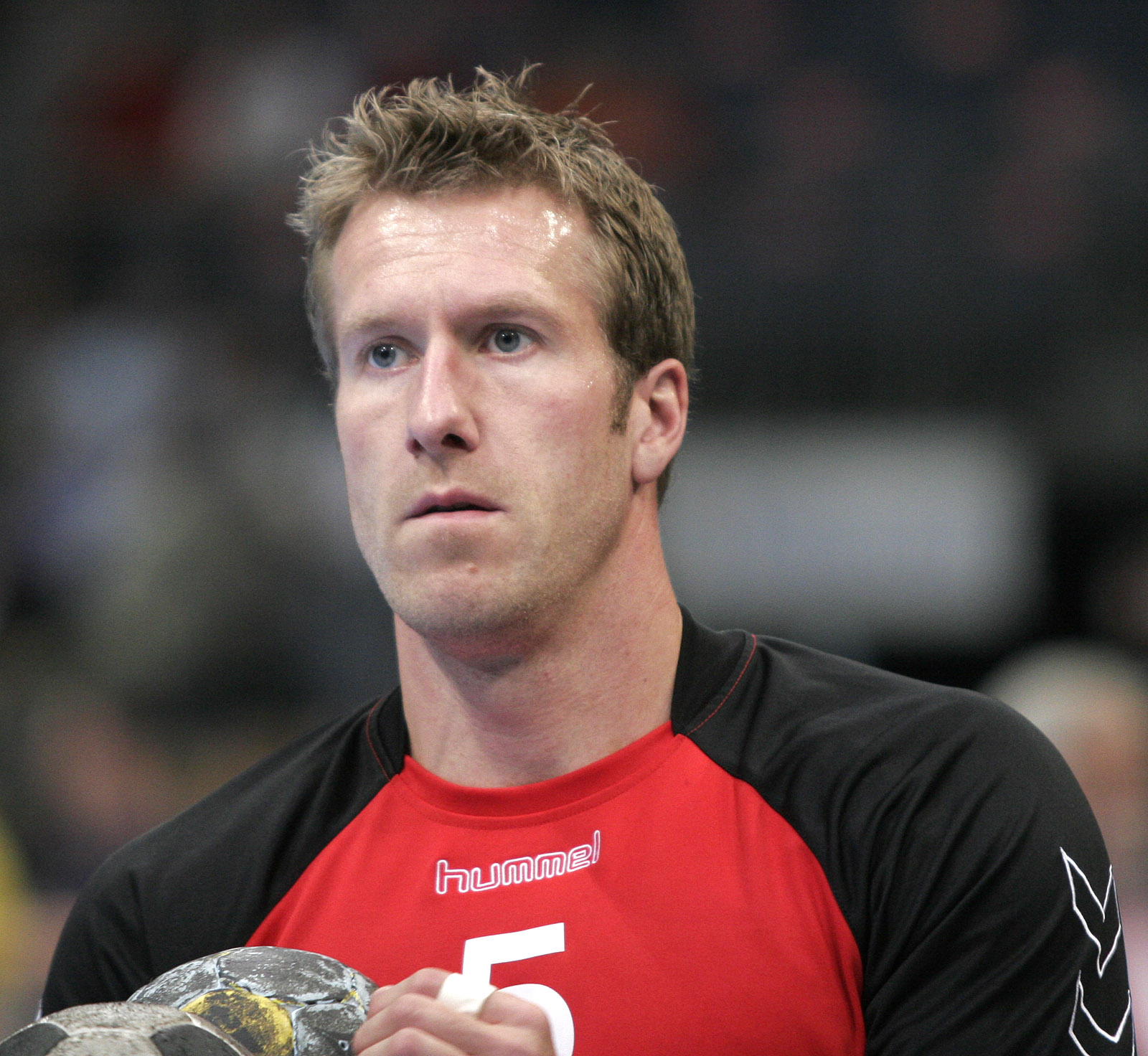

Personal information
- Nationality: Danish
- Born: 9 June 1975 (age 51) Hillerød, Denmark
- Height: 1.94 m (6 ft 4 in)

Sport
- Sport: Handball
- Position: Left Back

Youth career
- Years: Team
- 1985-1995: Team Helsinge

Senior clubs
- Years: Team
- 1995-1997: Helsingør IF
- 1997-2001: GOG
- 2001-2002: SG Flensburg-Handewitt
- 2002-2005: GOG
- 2005-2008: SG Flensburg-Handewitt
- 2008-2010: GOG Svendborg TGI
- 2010: Faaborg HK
- 2010-2014: Bjerringbro-Silkeborg
- 2014: Füchse Berlin
- 2015: TBV Lemgo
- 2015-2016: Ribe-Esbjerg HH
- 2016: Ajax København
- 2017: Ribe-Esbjerg HH
- 2018-2019: Ajax København
National team
Years	Team	Apps	(Gls)
1995-2012	Denmark	191	(289)
Medal record
Representing Denmark
World Championship
Silver medal – second place	2013 Spain	Team
European Championships
Gold medal – first place	2008 Norway	Team
Gold medal – first place	2012 Serbia	Team

Kasper Nielsen (born 9 June 1975) is a Danish former team handball player. He is a two-times European Champion by winning both the 2008 and the 2012 European Men's Handball Championships with the Danish national handball team. He is known as a defense specialist.

He participated at the 2008 Summer Olympics in Beijing, where the Danish team placed seventh, and the 2012 Summer Olympics in London where the team came sixth.

Today he works as a plumber.

== Career ==
Nielsen started playing handball at Team Helsinge. In 1995 he joined Helsingør IF and in 1997 GOG. Here he won the Danish Championship in 1998, 2000 and 2004. In the 2001-02 he joined German SG Flensburg-Handewitt for a single season and in 2005 he joined them for three seasons. In the 2006-07 season he reached the final of the Champions League, where Flensburg lost to arch-rivals THW Kiel.

When GOG was administratively relegated in 2010, he joined nearby 2nd tier team Faaborg HK.

Before the 2011-12 season he signed a contract with Bjerringbro-Silkeborg Håndbold. In his first season at the club, BSV reached the final of the Danish Championship, but lost to AG København.

From August to December 2014 he signed for Füchse Berlin to replace the injured Denis Spoljaric. In January 2015 he signed for TBV Lemgo for the rest of the season. He then joined Danish Ribe-Esbjerg HH in September 2015.

After the 2015-16 season he retired, but he reactivated his career at the second tier side Ajax København. After the 2016-17 he retired for a second time, but once again he came back to the court to rejoin Ribe-Esbjerg HH. In the 2018-19 season at the age of 43 he rejoined Ajax København.
