= Anders Eggert =

Danish handball player (born 1982)

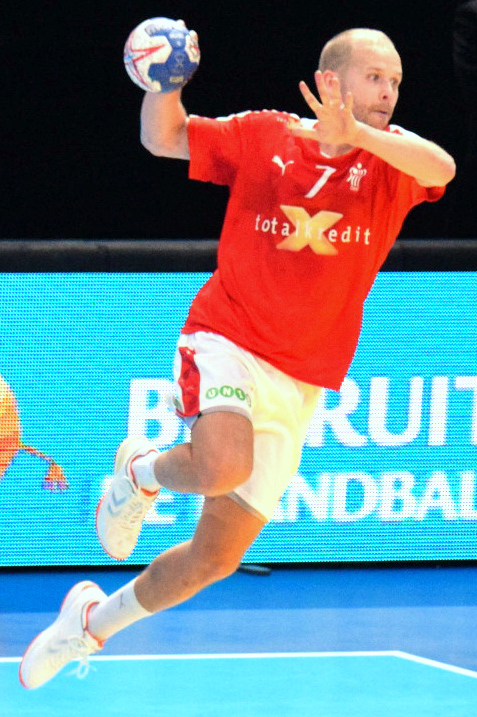
- Eggert in 2016

Personal information
- Full name: Anders Eggert Jensen; Anders Eggert Magnussen
- Nationality: Danish
- Born: 14 May 1982 (age 44) Aarhus, Denmark
- Height: 1.79 m (5 ft 10 in)

Sport
- Sport: Handball
- Position: Left wing

Senior clubs
- Years: Team
- –1998: Brabrand
- 1998–1999: Voel
- 1999–2000: Brabrand
- 2000–2003: Silkeborg/Voel KFUM
- 2003–2006: GOG
- 2006–2017: SG Flensburg-Handewitt
- 2008–2009: → Skjern Håndbold (loan)
- 2017–2021: Skjern Håndbold
National team
Years	Team	Apps	(Gls)
2003–2017	Denmark	160	(581)

Teams managed
- 2022–2026: KIF Kolding (Coach)
- 2024–now: SG Flensburg-Handewitt (assistant)
Medal record
World Championship
Silver medal – second place	2011 Sweden
Silver medal – second place	2013 Spain
European Championship
Gold medal – first place	2012 Serbia
Silver medal – second place	2014 Denmark

Anders Eggert (born 14 May 1982) is a Danish handball coach and former player. He has previously played in Denmark for GOG and Skjern Håndbold, and German side SG Flensburg-Handewitt. He was part of SG Flensburg-Handewitt team that won the 2013–14 EHF Champions League trophy. In his 11 years with SG Flensburg-Handewitt he played in 461 matches and scored 2531 times.

Since the summer of 2022 he has been the assistant coach at KIF Kolding. Additionally he has worked as a handball expert on Danish television.

== National team ==
Eggert made his debut for the Denmark men's national handball team in 2003. He became European Champion with the Danish team after winning the 2012 Championship in Serbia, defeating the host nation in the final, 21–19. In 2011 he was a part of the team that won the silver medal at the World Championships in Sweden.

He competed in handball at the 2012 Summer Olympics, where Denmark reached the quarterfinals, where they were knocked out by Sweden. At the 2013 World Men's Handball Championship he won his second silver medal, this time losing to Spain in the final. Eggert was the top scorer in the tournament with 55 goals.

== Honours ==
- EHF Champions League :
  - Gold: 2014
  - Silver: 2007
- EHF Cup Winner's Cup:
  - Gold: 2012
- German Cup:
  - Gold: 2015
- German Super Cup:
  - Gold: 2015
- Danish Championship:
  - Gold: 2004, 2018
- Danish Handball Cup:
  - Gold: 2003, 2005

== Individual awards ==
- Top Scorer of the World Championship: 2013
- Top Scorer of the Handball-Bundesliga: 2011
- Top Scorer of the Håndboldligaen: 2019
