= Damestenen =

Glacial erratic in Denmark

- Glacial erratic
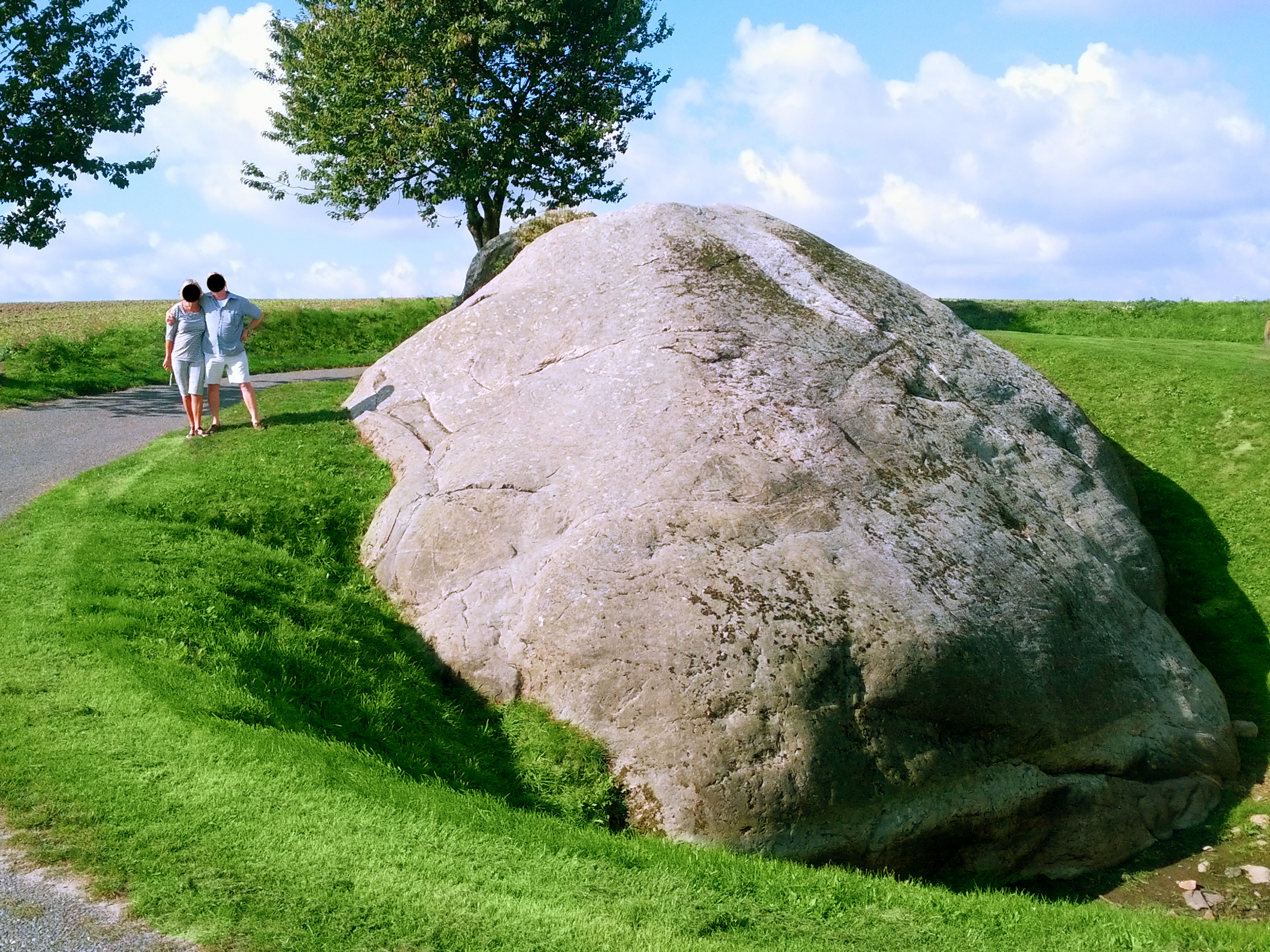

- Coordinates: 55°10′54″N 10°45′38″E
- Location: Near Hesselager
- Formed by: granite
- Geology: Glacial erratic

The Damestenen (lit. 'Stone of the Lady'), also referred as Hesselagerstenen (English: Large stone of Hesselager), is a glacial erratic located near Svendborg, in the south-east of Funen, Denmark.

== Geography ==
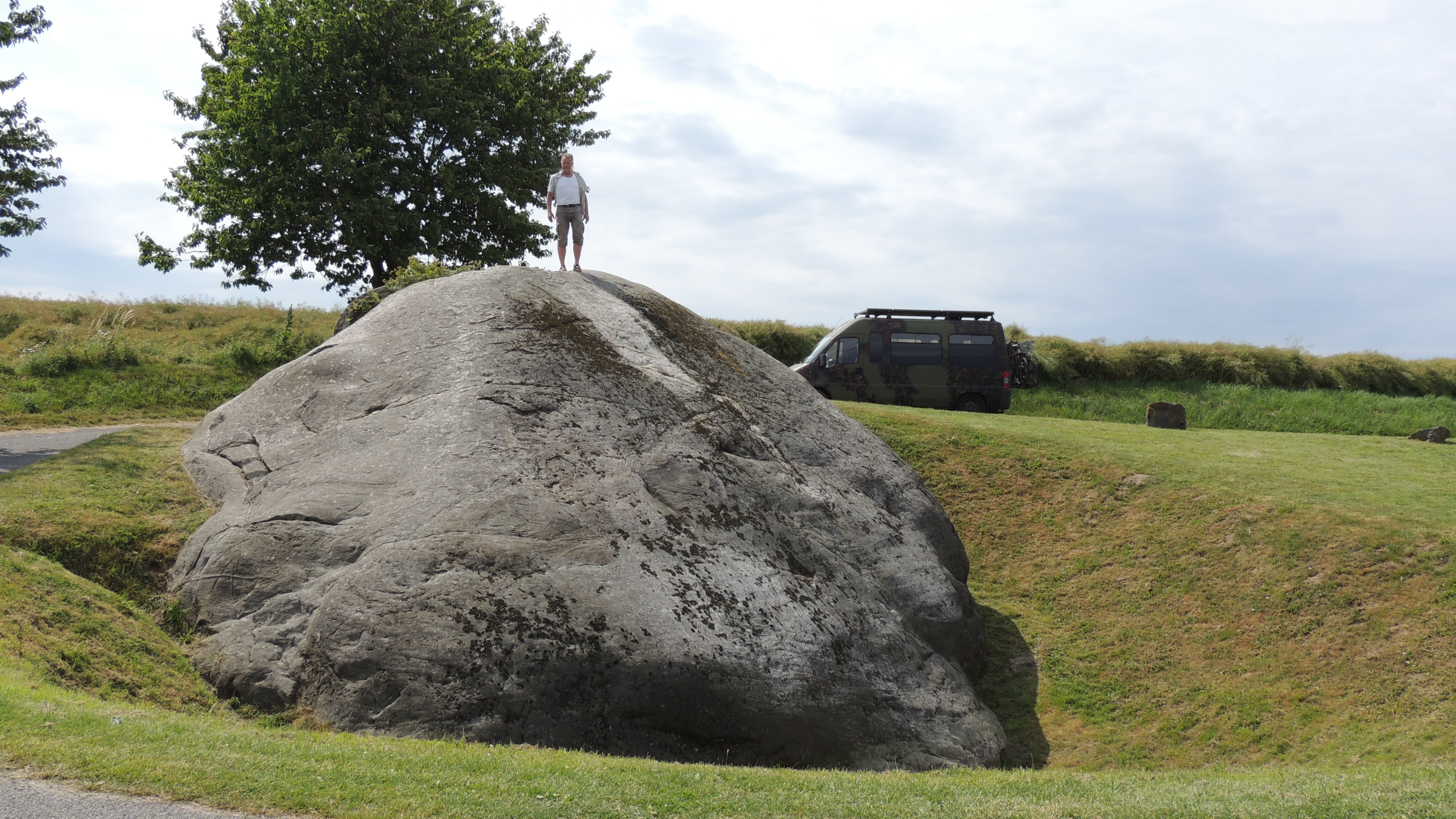
The Damestenen compared with a human being

The boulder is the biggest glacial erratic in Denmark, followed by the Tirslund Rock. It stands close to the village of Hesselager, some 20 km northeast of Svendborg; located in a field, it can be reached by a country lane named Damestenensvej.

== Features ==
The Damestenen consists of a block of light grey granite dating back to the last Last Glacial Period. Its height is 12 m, the circumference is 46 m, and its weight is 1000 tons.

== History ==
The boulder is mentioned by the Danish theologian Erik Pontoppidan in his work titled Den Danske Atlas (1763–1781). In 1840, during Christian VIII's kingdom, the boulder was analysed by the geologist Johan Georg Forchhammer, who suggested to excavate around it in order to determine its size and to check if it was connected to the underground bedrock. In 1843 the Damestenen was actually excavated on its northeast side.

A folk legend tells that it was thrown from the north of the Langeland island by a female giant aiming to destroy the spire of Svindinge's church, but in spite of the giant's strength the stone fell midway.

== See also ==
- List of individual rocks
