= Steven Plucnar Jacobsen =

Danish handball player (born 2000)

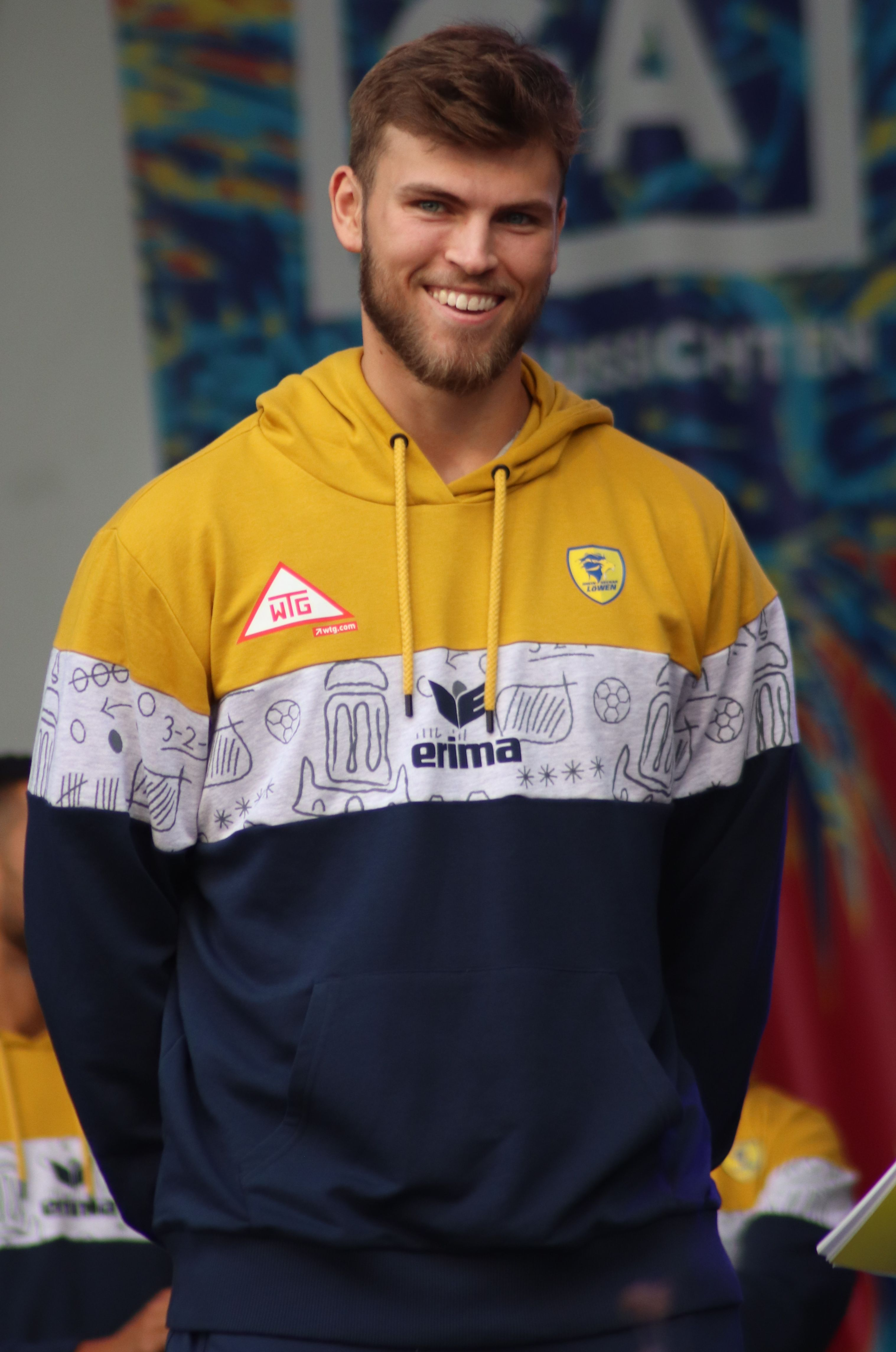
- Steven Plucnar Jacobsen at the opening of BUGA 2023

Personal information
- Nationality: Danish
- Born: 22 October 2000 (age 25) Solrød, Denmark
- Height: 2.01 m (6 ft 7 in)

Sport
- Sport: Handball
- Position: Pivot
- Current club: Rhein-Neckar Löwen
- Number: 9

Youth career
- Years: Team
- –: Jersie HK
- –: GOG Håndbold

Senior clubs
- Years: Team
- 2019–2021: GOG Håndbold
- 2021–2022: Lugi HF
- 2022–2023: KIF Kolding
- 2023–2026: Rhein-Neckar Löwen
- 2026–: GOG Håndbold
National team
Years	Team	Apps
2026	Denmark	1
Medal record
Youth World Championship
Bronze medal – third place	2019 North Macedonia
European U-18 Championship
Bronze medal – third place	2018 Croatia

Steven Plucnar Jacobsen (born 22 October 2000 in Solrød, Denmark) is a Danish handball player for Rhein-Neckar Löwen.

He made his debut for the Danish national team on 19 March 2026 in a Golden League match against Norway.

== Achievements ==
- Danish Handball Cup
  - Winner: 2019
- Swedish Handball Cup
  - Runner-up: 2022
