= Lasse Svan Hansen =

Danish handball player (born 1983)

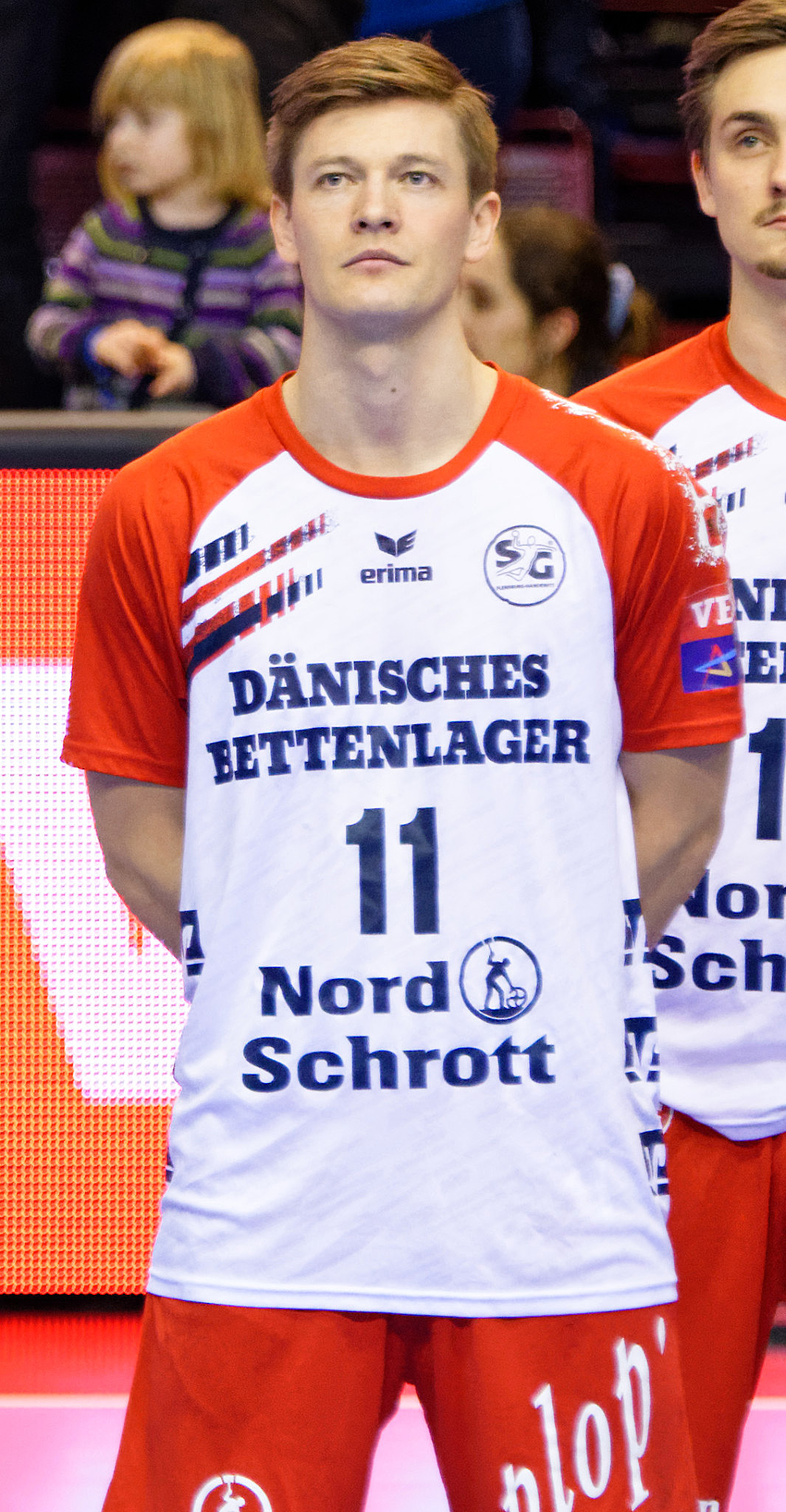
- Svan in 2016

Personal information
- Nationality: Danish
- Born: 31 August 1983 (age 43) Stevns, Denmark
- Height: 1.85 m (6 ft 1 in)

Sport
- Sport: Handball
- Position: Right wing

Senior clubs
- Years: Team
- 1995–2002: Sierslev HK
- 2002–2008: GOG
- 2008–2022: SG Flensburg-Handewitt
National team
Years	Team	Apps	(Gls)
2003–2022	Denmark	246	(572)
Medal record
Olympic Games
Gold medal – first place	2016 Rio de Janeiro	Team
Silver medal – second place	2020 Tokyo	Team
World Championship
Gold medal – first place	2019 Germany/Denmark
Gold medal – first place	2021 Egypt
Silver medal – second place	2011 Sweden
Silver medal – second place	2013 Spain
European Championship
Gold medal – first place	2012 Serbia
Silver medal – second place	2014 Denmark
Bronze medal – third place	2022 Hungary/Slovakia

Lasse Svan Hansen (born 31 August 1983) is a Danish retired handballer, who last played for SG Flensburg-Handewitt and the Danish national team He was admitted to the Danish Sports Hall of Fame in 2024 and in the European Handball Federation Hall of Fame in 2023.

== Career ==
Svan started playing handball at Sierslev HK in Store Heddinge. Later he joined GOG Svendborg on Funen, where he debuted in the Danish handball league, Herrehåndboldligaen in 2002.

He won the Danish Championship with GOG in 2007, and the Danish Cup in 2002, 2003 and 2005.

In 2008, he joined German club SG Flensburg-Handewitt in a trade for Kasper Nielsen. With Flensburg he won the EHF Cup Winners' Cup in 2012, the EHF Champions League in 2014 and the DHB-Pokal in 2018 and in 2019. In 2021, he became the top appearance maker for SG Flensburg-Handewitt with 627 matches, taking the record from fellow Dane Lars Christiansen. He retired the following summer after 14 years at the club.

=== National team ===
Svan has had one of the most successful careers ever on the Danish national team. He became European Champion with the Danish national team, after winning the 2012 Championship in Serbia, defeating the host nation in the final, 21–19.

In 2011, he also won silver medal at the World Championships in Sweden, losing to France in the final, and again at the 2013 World Championship in Spain, where Denmark lost to the host nation Spain in the final.

At the 2016 Olympics, he won gold medals with the Danish team, the first time Denmark had done so. Here he was in the tournament all-star team.

He won the 2019 World Men's Handball Championship; the first time Denmark ever won the World Championship. He defended the title at the 2021 World Men's Handball Championship. In the quarter final against Egypt, he scored the final penalty in a penalty throw shootout, in what is called one of the wildest handball games ever played. In the final, he was injured early and couldn't continue.

At the 2020 Olympics, he won Olympic silver medals with the Danish team, losing to France in the final.

He played his last national team match on 15 April 2022 against Poland, receiving standing ovations by the Danish fans at the end of the match.

== Post-playing career ==
After his playing career he has worked as a mental coach for the Counter Strike e-sports team Heroic. He started in this position in 2022.

He has also acted as handball commentator and host on Danish television.

He has studied to be teacher at UCL Skårup Seminarium.

== Individual awards ==
- All-star Right wing of the Olympic Games: 2016

== Honours ==
- EHF Champions League :
  - Gold : 2014
- German Championship:
  - Gold: 2018, 2019
- German Cup:
  - Gold: 2015
- German Super Cup
  - Gold: 2013, 2019
- Danish Championship:
  - Gold: 2004, 2007
- Danish Handball Cup:
  - Gold: 2002, 2003, 2005
