= GOG Håndbold =

Danish handball club

- Full name: Gudme Oure Gudbjerg
- Short name: GOG
- Founded: 1 May 1973; 53 years ago
- Arena: Arena Svendborg
- Capacity: 4,500
- President: Kasper Jørgensen
- Head coach: Kasper Kristensen
- League: Herreligaen
- 2024-25: Håndboldligaen, 3rd of 14
- Club colours
Home	Away

GOG is a professional handball club based in the small town of Gudme on Funen, Denmark. The club is one of the most successful in the history of Danish handball having won the Danish Handball Championship 9 times and the Danish Handball Cup a record 13 times. Currently GOG competes in the men's Danish Handball League. GOG is famous for their academy, which is one of the best in the world. The academy won the first edition of the 2025 EHF Youth Club Trophy.

Location of GOG Gudme

== History ==
=== GOG ===
The club was founded on 1 May 1973 as a result of a merger between Gudbjerg, Oure, and Gudme. In 1975 the club won the Danish junior championship for the first time. GOG's men's team got promoted to the best league in Denmark in 1987 and won its first Danish Handball Championship in 1992. The women's team got promoted to the top division for the first time in 1984. In 1990 the club became fully professional. During the 1990's GOG was a dominant force in Danish handball, including winning four championships in a row. This was a time defined by the competitive rivalry with KIF Kolding.

=== GOG Svendborg TGI ===
In 2005, GOG and Svendborg TGI merged their first teams. GOG had finished the last season in third, while Svendborg TGI had played a single season in the top division, and been relegated in last place.

The club won the Danish championship for men in 2006/2007. In 2009 the women's team was separated from GOG and became HC Odense. On 26 January 2010, GOG Svendborg TGI was declared bankrupt and relegated to the 2nd Division.

=== GOG 2010 ===
In March 2010, the club was reformed as GOG 2010 A/S, with Kasper Jørgensen as new CEO and Hemming Van as chairman of the board. The ambition was to have the club back in the top division within three years. The first season after the forced relegation, the 2010–11 season, the club was promoted to Danish 1st Division. In the 2012/2013 season, GOG managed to win the 1st division and was promoted back to the men's Danish Men's Handball League. In the 2021-22 season GOG won the Danish league once again. GOG defended their title by winning the Danish league in the 2022-23 season.

== Honours ==
- Danish Handball League: 9
  - Gold: 1992, 1995, 1996, 1998, 2000, 2004, 2007, 2022, 2023
  - Silver: 1988, 1989, 1991, 1993, 1994, 2001, 2006, 2008, 2019, 2020
- Danish Handball Cup: 13 (record)
  - Gold: 1990, 1991, 1992, 1995, 1996, 1997, 2002, 2003, 2005, 2019, 2022, 2023, 2024
  - Silver: 1993, 2001, 2007, 2008, 2021
- Danish Super Cup: 1
  - Gold: 2023
  - Silver: 2019, 2020, 2022, 2024
- EHF Cup Winners' Cup
  - Silver: 1995
- Double

Winners (5): 1991–92, 1994–95, 1995–96, 2021–22, 2022–23

== Team ==
=== Current squad ===
Squad for the 2026–27 season

Goalkeeper

- 1 (Denmark) Kevin Møller
- 12 (Denmark) Frederik Møller Wolff

Left Wingers

- 10 (Sweden) Lucas Pellas
- 17 (Denmark) William Enoch Dalby

Right Wingers

- 21 (Denmark) Kasper Emil Kildelund
- 33 (Sweden) Isak Persson

Pivots

- 4 (Denmark) Andreas Magaard
- 13 (Norway) Lasse Balstad
- 20 (Denmark) Frederik Nygård Jespersen
- 83 (Denmark) Steven Plucnar

Left Backs

- 3 (Denmark) Nicolai Nygaard Pedersen
- 8 (Switzerland) Manuel Zehnder
- 79 (Denmark) Emil Tonnesen

Centre Backs

- 2 (Denmark) Emil Bak
- 78 (Faroe Islands) Óli Mittún

Right Backs

- 7 (Denmark) Lasse Vilhelmsen
- 24 (Denmark) Emil Darling Sørensen
- 27 (Denmark) Oskar Møller Jakobsen
- 29 (Denmark) Hjalte Lykke

=== Technical staff ===
- Head Coach: (Denmark) Kasper Kristensen
- Assistant Coach: (Denmark) Rasmus Bertelsen
- Team Leader: (Denmark) Bent Møller

=== Transfers ===
Transfers for the 2026–27 season

Joining

- (Sweden) Lucas Pellas (LW) from (France) Montpellier Handball
- (Sweden) Isak Persson (RW) from (Sweden) HK Malmö
- (Switzerland) Manuel Zehnder (LB) from (Germany) SC Magdeburg
- (Denmark) Kevin Møller (GK) from (Germany) SG Flensburg-Handewitt
- (Denmark) Steven Plucnar (LP) from (Germany) Rhein-Neckar Löwen
- (Denmark) Andreas Magaard (LP) from (Germany) HSV Hamburg
- (Denmark) Frederik Møller Wolff (GK) back from loan at (Denmark) TTH Holstebro

Leaving

- (Norway) Henrik Jakobsen (LP) to (Denmark) Fredericia HK
- (Sweden) Peter Johannesson (GK) to (Sweden) IK Sävehof
- (Sweden) Anton Lindskog (LP) to (Denmark) Aalborg Håndbold
- (Sweden) Casper Käll (CB) to (Denmark) Ribe-Esbjerg HH
- (Denmark) Salah Boutaf (GK) to (Denmark) Ribe-Esbjerg HH
- (Denmark) Frederik Bjerre (LW) to (Poland) Wisła Płock
- (Denmark) Oskar Vind Rasmussen (RW) to (Germany) SC Magdeburg
- (Denmark) Frederik Pedersen (CB) to (Norway) Elverum Håndball
- (Denmark) Kasper Teglgaard Pedersen (LP) to (Denmark) SønderjyskE Herrehåndbold
- (Denmark) Jacob Dalager (LB) on loan at (Denmark) Grindsted GIF Håndbold

=== Transfer History ===
Transfers for the 2025–26 season

Joining

- (Faroe Islands) Óli Mittún (CB) from (Sweden) IK Sävehof
- (Norway) Lasse Balstad (LP) from (Denmark) Fredericia HK
- (Sweden) Casper Käll (CB) from (France) Fenix Toulouse Handball
- (Denmark) Frederik Bjerre (LW) from (Denmark) TTH Holstebro
- (Denmark) Mikkel Lang (RW) from (Denmark) Skanderborg AGF Håndbold

Leaving

- (Norway) Alexander Blonz (LW) to (Denmark) Aalborg Håndbold
- (Norway) Tobias Grøndahl (CB) to (Germany) Füchse Berlin
- (Sweden) Linus Persson (RB) to (Portugal) FC Porto
- (Denmark) Joachim Lyng Als (LW) to (Denmark) TTH Holstebro
- (Denmark) Frederik Tilsted (CB) to (Denmark) SønderjyskE Håndbold
- (Denmark) Emil La Cour (LW) (to (Denmark) SønderjyskE Håndbold)
- (Denmark) Andreas Johann Nielsen (P) (to (Denmark) HØJ Elite)
- (Denmark) Frederik Møller Wolff (GK) on loan to (Denmark) TTH Holstebro

== European Handball ==
=== EHF Champions League ===
Season	Round	Club	Home	Away	Aggregate	Comment
2025–26	Group	(Spain) Barça	28–41	32–37	5th place	
2025–26	Group	(Hungary) SC Pick Szeged	31–36	37–34	5th place	—
2025–26	Group	(North Macedonia) RK Eurofarm Pelister	28–28	31–28	5th place	—
2025–26	Group	(Germany) SC Magdeburg	30–39	30–37	5th place	—
2025–26	Group	(Croatia) RK Zagreb	33–28	36–31	5th place	—
2025–26	Group	(France) PSG Handball	28–31	36–34	5th place	—
2025–26	Group	(Poland) Orlen Wisła Płock	28–30	35–34	5th place	—
2025–26	Playoffs	(France) HBC Nantes	33–34	28–40	61–74	—
2023–24	Group	(Slovenia) Celje Pivovarna Laško	38–36	34–30	5th place	—
2023–24	Group	(Poland) Orlen Wisła Płock	32–32	30–26	5th place	—
2023–24	Group	(Hungary) Telekom Veszprém	36–30	31–34	5th place	—
2023–24	Group	(Spain) Barça	23–30	30–38	5th place	—
2023–24	Group	(France) Montpellier Handball	32–27	25–36	5th place	—
2023–24	Group	(Portugal) FC Porto	35–27	31–32	5th place	—
2023–24	Group	(Germany) SC Magdeburg	25–32	27–35	5th place	—
2023–24	Playoffs	(Poland) Industria Kielce	25–33	28–33	53–66	—
2022–23	Group	(Croatia) PPD Zagreb	33–29	31–27	4th place	—
2022–23	Group	(Romania) Dinamo București	38–38	27–30	4th place	—
2022–23	Group	(Poland) Orlen Wisła Płock	31–24	27–31	4th place	—
2022–23	Group	(Hungary) Telekom Veszprém	30–31	37–36	4th place	—
2022–23	Group	(Portugal) FC Porto	34–33	33–26	4th place	—
2022–23	Group	(Germany) SC Magdeburg	33–32	34–36	4th place	—
2022–23	Group	(France) Paris Saint-Germain	35–40	36–41	4th place	—
2022–23	Playoffs	(Denmark) Aalborg Håndbold	32–24	28–30	60–54	—
2022–23	Quarterfinals	(Spain) Barça	30–37	31–36	61–73	—
2019–20	Group	(Sweden) IFK Kristianstad	37–37	33–24	3rd place	—
2019–20	Group	(Russia) Chekhovskiye Medvedi	38–31	28–36	3rd place	—
2019–20	Group	(Romania) CS Dinamo București	31–32	28–35	3rd place	—
2019–20	Group	(Poland) Orlen Wisła Płock	28–27	24–27	3rd place	—
2019–20	Group	(Switzerland) Kadetten Schaffhausen	35–30	28–40	3rd place	—
2008–09	Group	(Spain) BM Ciudad Real	24–34	37–26	50–71	—
2008–09	Group	(Greece) A.S.E Doukas	29–21	23–41	70–44	—
2008–09	Group	(Bosnia and Herzegovina) Bosna Sarajevo	30–26	32–26	56–58	—
2008–09	Main Round	(Spain) BM Ciudad Real	24–34	37–26	50–71	—
2008–09	Main Round	(Germany) THW Kiel	31–43	37–29	60–80	—
2008–09	Main Round	(Spain) FC Barcelona	29–35	36–27	56–71	—
2007–08	Group	(Spain) Portland San Antonio	29–29	28–28	57–57	—
2007–08	Group	(Slovakia) Tatran Presov	42–32	31–38	80–63	—
2007–08	Group	(Austria) A1 Bregenz HB	33–29	32–26	59–61	—
2007–08	Main Round	(Spain) FC Barcelona	35–33	29–24	59–62	—
2007–08	Main Round	(Slovenia) RK Celje	34–33	30–30	64–63	—
2007–08	Main Round	(Hungary) SC Pick Szeged	28–25	34–33	61–58	—
2006–07	Group	(Germany) THW Kiel	28–32	34–32	60–66	—
2006–07	Group	(Romania) C.S. HCM Constanta	33–17	33–28	61–50	—
2006–07	Group	(Czech Republic) HC Banik OKD Karvina	45–32	32–37	82–64	—
2006–07	1/8 Finals	(Spain) BM Ciudad Real	28–33	31–30	58–64	—
2004–05	Group	(Belarus) Brestskiy HC Meshkovo	36–17	23–25	61–40	—
2004–05	Group	(Russia) Chekhovskiye Medvedi	32–26	34–33	65–60	—
2004–05	Group	(Slovenia) RK Gorenje Velenje	28–22	29–24	52–51	—
2004–05	1/8 Finals	(Spain) BM Ciudad Real	29–45	34–31	60–79	—
2000–01	Group	(Portugal) ABC Braga	26–25	26–25	51–51	—
2000–01	Group	(Germany) THW Kiel	22–23	28–34	56–51	—
2000–01	Group	(Italy) Pallamano Trieste	28–24	32–30	58–54	—
1998–99	Group	(Norway) Viking Stavanger HK	29–28	34–26	55–62	—
1998–99	Group	(Germany) THW Kiel	26–31	28–23	49–59	—
1998–99	Group	(Russia) HC Kaustik Volgograd	35–28	31–21	56–59	—
1998–99	1/16 Finals	(Romania) CS Minaur	24–18	29–24	48–47	—
1996–97	Group	(France) PSG Handball	31–22	25–20	51–47	—
1996–97	Group	(Spain) Caja Cantabria Santander	23–24	33–23	46–57	—
1996–97	Group	(Slovenia) RK Celje	18–22	29–18	36–51	—
1996–97	1/16 Finals	(North Macedonia) FK Pelister	21–24	14–19	40–38	—
1995–96	Group	(Spain) FC Barcelona	22–22	35–23	45–57	—
1995–96	Group	(Croatia) RK Zagreb	21–21	26–21	42–47	—
1995–96	Group	(Switzerland) Pfadi Winterthur	26–23	32–23	49–55	—
1995–96	1/16 Finals	(Socialist Federal Republic of Yugoslavia) FK Partizan	34–21	26–18	52–47	—
1995–96	1/8 Finals	(Belarus) SKA Minsk	28–21	26–23	51–47	—

=== EHF Cup/EHF European League ===
Season	Round	Club	Home	Away	Aggregate	Comment
2024–25	Group	(Slovenia) RK Gorenje Velenje	31–21	35–35	2nd place	
2024–25	Group	(Switzerland) HC Kriens-Luzern	39–36	30–32	2nd place	—
2024–25	Group	(Spain) Abanca Ademar León	36–23	27–21	2nd place	—
2024–25	Main round	(Spain) Fraikin BM Granollers	32–31	36–36	2nd place	—
2024–25	Main round	(France) Montpellier Handball	33–27	28–30	2nd place	—
2024–25	Play-offs	(Portugal) SL Benfica	34–31	31–33	65–64	—
2024–25	Quarterfinals	(Germany) SG Flensburg-Handewitt	26–29	29–35	55–64	—
2021–22	First qualifying round	(Slovenia) RK Celje Pivovarna Laško	29–33	36–25	65–58	—
2021–22	Second qualifying round	(Denmark) Mors-Thy Håndbold	30–24	27–27	57–51	—
2021–22	Group	(Russia) Chekhovskiye Medvedi	27–26	39–32	1st place	—
2021–22	Group	(Finland) Cocks	46–30	34–23	1st place	—
2021–22	Group	(France) HBC Nantes	29–29	24–27	1st place	—
2021–22	Group	(Portugal) SL Benfica	39–38	33–25	1st place	—
2021–22	Group	(Germany) TBV Lemgo	34–28	35–39	1st place	—
2021–22	Last 16	(Spain) Bidasoa Irun	30–28	33–31	63–59	—
2021–22	Quarterfinals	(Croatia) RK Nexe	27–32	37–37	64–69	—
2020–21	Second qualifying round	(Switzerland) Pfadi Winterthur	33–24	31–35	64–59	—
2020–21	Group	(Germany) Rhein-Neckar Löwen	32–37	24–32	3rd place	—
2020–21	Group	(Slovenia) RK Trimo Trebnje	32–31	30–27	3rd place	—
2020–21	Group	(North Macedonia) RK Eurofarm Pelister	30–29	31–32	3rd place	—
2020–21	Group	(Switzerland) Kadetten Schaffhausen	34–28	28–29	3rd place	—
2020–21	Group	(Hungary) Grundfos Tatabanya KC	30–28	35–32	3rd place	—
2020–21	Last 16	(Russia) HC CSKA	33–31	35–30	68–61	—
2020–21	Quarterfinals	(Poland) Orlen Wisła Płock	30–27	26–31	56–58	—
2018–19	Round 3	(Serbia) Vojvodina	38–25	32–27	70–52	—
2018–19	Group	(Poland) Azoty-Puławy	41–29	31–28	2nd place	—
2018–19	Group	(Spain) Fraikin Granollers	34–26	31–34	2nd place	—
2018–19	Group	(Germany) THW Kiel	22–26	23–37	2nd place	—
2016–17	Round 3	(Sweden) Alingsås HK	26–29	32–27	58–56	—
2016–17	Group Stage	(Germany) Füchse Berlin	26–31	29–37	55–68	—
2016–17	Group Stage	(France) Saint-Raphaël Var Handball	28–32	36–32	64–64	—
2016–17	Group Stage	(Slovenia) RD Ribnica	32–27	36–31	68–58	—
2009–10	Round 3	(Serbia) RK Partizan	27–19	28–24	51–47	—
2009–10	Round 4	(France) Dunkerque HB Grand Littoral	0–10	10–0	0–20	—
2005–06	Round 3	(Bulgaria) HC Lokomotiv-Nadin Varna	36–24	30–28	64–54	—
2005–06	1/8 Finals	(Portugal) Madeira Andebol SAD	35–32	32–34	69–64	—
2005–06	1/4 Finals	(Germany) Frisch Auf Göppingen	24–29	37–32	56–66	—
2001–02	Round 2	(Belarus) SKA Minsk	35–24	27–37	72–51	—
2001–02	Round 3	(Croatia) RK "Brodomerkur" Split	38–17	26–29	67–43	—
2001–02	Round 4	(North Macedonia) RK Mladost	36–17	24–27	63–41	—
2001–02	1/4 Finals	(Spain) BM. Galdar	27–34	30–26	53–64	—
1999-00	1/16 Finals	(Romania) "Fibrex" Savinesti	31–21	23–21	52–44	—
1999-00	1/8 Finals	(Poland) KS Warszawianka	25–24	22–31	56–46	—
1999-00	1/4 Finals	(Germany) SG Flensburg-Handewitt	24–28	24–22	46–52	—

=== EHF Cup Winners' Cup ===
Season	Round	Club	Home	Away	Aggregate	Comment
2003–04	Round 2	(Greece) A. S. Ionikos Athens	34–19	22–38	72–41	—
2003–04	Round 3	(Spain) Portland San Antonio	26–28	26–24	50–54	—
1997–98	1/16 Finals	(Socialist Federal Republic of Yugoslavia) Jugopetrol Železničar Niš	28–22	24–19	47–46	—
1997–98	1/8 Finals	(Slovakia) SKP Bratislava	33–18	22–28	61–40	—
1997–98	1/4 Finals	(Spain) Caja Cantabria Santander	25–21	26–18	43–47	—
2002–03	Round 3	(Croatia) RK Metković Jambo	33–20	23–22	55–42	—
2002–03	Round 4	(France) Chambéry Savoie Handball	24–24	33–24	48–57	—
1994–95	1/16 Finals	(Israel) Maccabi Rishon le Zion	37–12	22–27	64–34	—
1994–95	1/8 Finals	(Austria) Remus Bärnbach-Köflach	18–19	19–26	44–38	—
1994–95	1/4 Finals	(Iceland) Fimleikafélag Hafnarfjarðar	25–21	22–27	52–43	—
1994–95	1/2 Finals	(Switzerland) BSV Borba Luzern	29–21	24–21	53–42	—
1994–95	Finals	(Spain) FC Barcelona	24–31	26–22	46–57	—
1993–94	1/16 Finals	(Italy) Telenorba Conversano	30–16	29–21	59–37	—
1993–94	1/8 Finals	(Belgium) Extran Beyne	28–19	21–22	50–40	—
1993–94	1/4 Finals	(Germany) TSV Bayer Dormagen	28–13	22–19	35–47	—

== Notable former players ==
Men

- (Denmark) Mikkel Hansen
- (Denmark) Lasse Svan Hansen
- (Denmark) Anders Eggert
- (Denmark) Joachim Boldsen
- (Denmark) Nikolaj Jacobsen
- (Denmark) Søren Stryger
- (Denmark) Kevin Møller
- (Denmark) Bent Møller
- (Denmark) Søren Haagen
- (Denmark) Thomas Mogensen
- (Denmark) Niklas Landin Jacobsen
- (Denmark) Kasper Nielsen
- (Denmark) Torsten Laen
- (Denmark) Peter Henriksen
- (Denmark) Klavs Bruun Jørgensen
- (Denmark) Henrik Gerster
- (Denmark) Lasse Møller
- (Denmark) Simon Pytlick
- (Denmark) Mathias Gidsel
- (Denmark) Emil Jakobsen
- (Sweden) Magnus Jernemyr
- (Sweden) Fredrik Petersen
- (Iceland) Ásgeir Örn Hallgrímsson
- (Iceland) Snorri Guðjónsson
- (Greenland) Jakob Larsen
- (Norway) Espen Christensen
- (Norway) Ole Erevik (2017–2018)

Women

- (Denmark) Rikke Hørlykke
- (Denmark) Ditte Andersen
- (Denmark) Lene Lund Høy Karlsen
- (Denmark) Mette Sjøberg
- (Denmark) Malene Dalgaard
- (Denmark) Gitte Brøgger Led
- (Denmark) Trine Jensen
- (Denmark) Gitte Sunesen
- (Denmark) Line Jørgensen
- (Denmark) Winnie Mølgaard
- (Denmark) Mette Iversen Sahlholdt
- (Denmark) Maibritt Kviesgaard
- (Russia) Inna Suslina
- (Russia) Anna Kareeva
- (Netherlands) Pearl van der Wissel
- (Netherlands) Monique Feijen
- (Netherlands) Joyce Hilster
- (Netherlands) Ana Razdorov
- (Netherlands) Birgit van Os
- (Netherlands) Olga Assink
- (Netherlands) Elly an de Boer
- (Netherlands) Saskia Mulder
- (Netherlands) Natasja Burgers
- (Norway) Anette Hovind Johansen
- (Norway) Ragnhild Aamodt
- (Norway) Marianne Rokne
- (Japan) Aiko Hayafune
- (Hungary) Krisztina Nagy
- (Sweden) Tina Flognman
- (Sweden) Sara Kristina Andersson
- (Italy) Sabrina Porini
- (Switzerland) Soka Smitran

== Notable former coaches ==
- (Denmark) Jan Pytlick
- (Iceland) Guðmundur Guðmundsson
- (Sweden) Ulf Schefvert
- (Denmark) Nicolej Krickau
