= Oure =

- Town
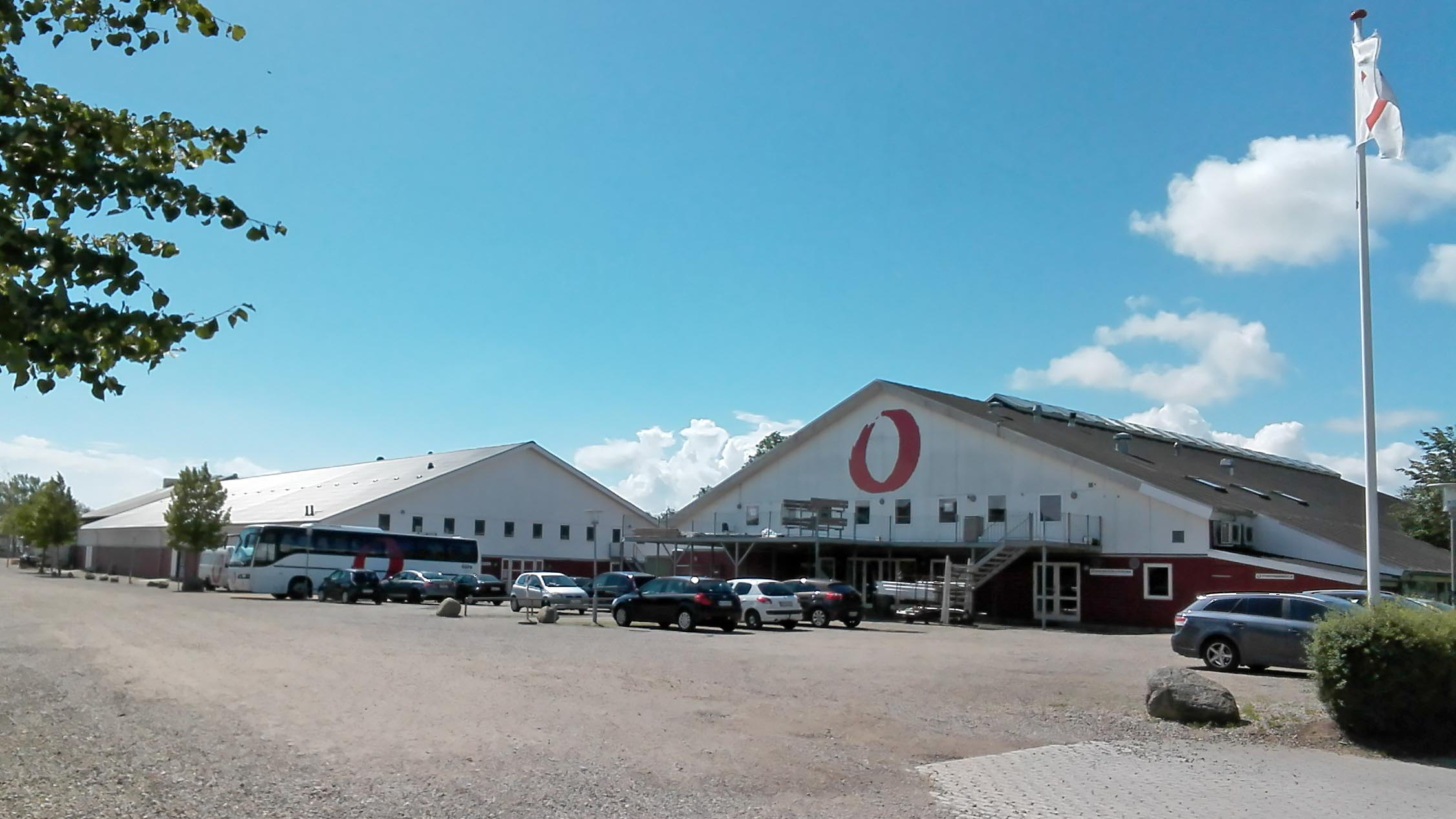
- School in Oure

- Location in the Region of Southern Denmark
- Coordinates: 55°7′9″N 10°43′32″E
- Country: Denmark
- Region: Southern Denmark
- Municipality: Svendborg

Population (2026)
  - Total: 499
- Time zone: UTC+1 (CET)
  - Summer (DST): UTC+2 (CEST)

Oure is a small town located on the island of Funen in south-central Denmark, in Svendborg Municipality. It is located 25 km south of Nyborg, 6 km southwest of Lundeborg and 12 km northeast of Svendborg.

The handball club GOG Håndbold, who has won the Danish Championship several times, was founded as a merger between the locals clubs in Oure, Gudbjerg and Gudme.
