= Malene Dalgaard =

Danish handballer (born 1984)

Personal information
- Full name: Malene Abiltrup Dalgaard-Hansen
- Nationality: Danish
- Born: 28 January 1984 (age 42) Skjern, Denmark
- Height: 180 cm (71 in)

Sport
- Sport: Handball
- Current club: Retired

Senior clubs
- Years: Team
- -2004: Skjern Håndbold
- 2004-2008: GOG Håndbold
- 2008-2013: FC Midtjylland Håndbold
- 2013-2014: Ringkøbing Håndbold
National team
Years	Team	Apps	(Gls)
2003-2008	Denmark	29	(44)

Malene Abiltrup Dalgaard-Hansen (born 28 January 1984) is a former Danish handball player, who played for Skjern Håndbold (until 2004), GOG (2004–2008), FC Midtjylland Håndbold (2008–2013) and Ringkøbing Håndbold (2013–2014) as well as the Danish national team. She retired in 2014 because of a concussion.
