= Gudbjerg =

- Town
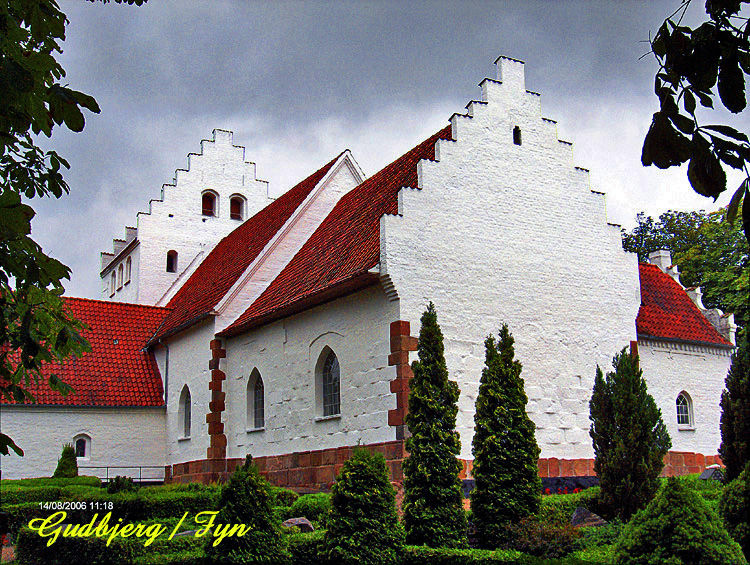
- Gudbjerg Church

- Location in the Region of Southern Denmark
- Coordinates: 55°9′18″N 10°39′59″E
- Country: Denmark
- Region: Southern Denmark
- Municipality: Svendborg

Population (2026)
  - Total: 466
- Time zone: UTC+1 (CET)
  - Summer (DST): UTC+2 (CEST)

Gudbjerg is a town located on the island of Funen in south-central Denmark, in Svendborg Municipality.

The handball club GOG Håndbold, who has won the Danish Championship several times, was founded as a merger between the locals clubs in Gudbjerg, Oure and Gudme.

== Notable people ==
- Lene Lund Høy Karlsen (born 1979 in Gudbjerg) a Danish former handball player who played in Viborg HK
