= Casper Käll =

Swedish handball player (born 2000)

Personal information
- Full name: Casper Emil Käll
- Nationality: Swedish
- Born: 26 November 2000 (age 25) Lund, Sweden
- Height: 1.86 m (6 ft 1 in)

Sport
- Sport: Handball
- Position: Centre back
- Current club: GOG Håndbold

Youth career
- Years: Team
- –: Kävlinge HK
- –: Lugi HF

Senior clubs
- Years: Team
- 2017–2023: Lugi HF
- 2023–2025: Fenix Toulouse
- 2025–: GOG Håndbold
Medal record
European U-18 Championship
Gold medal – first place	2018 Croatia

Casper Käll (born 26 November 2000) is a Swedish handball player for GOG Håndbold.

He represented Sweden at the 2018 European Men's U-18 Handball Championship and won a gold medal.
