= Kirkeby, Denmark =

Kirkeby
- Town
- Location in the Region of Southern Denmark
- Coordinates: 55°6′51″N 10°31′52″E
- Country: Denmark
- Region: Southern Denmark
- Municipality: Svendborg

Population (2026)
  - Total: 560
- Time zone: UTC+1 (CET)
  - Summer (DST): UTC+2 (CEST)

Kirkeby Church on the island of Funen, Denmark.

Kirkeby is a small town located on the island of Funen in south-central Denmark, in Svendborg Municipality.
