= Hesselager =

- Town
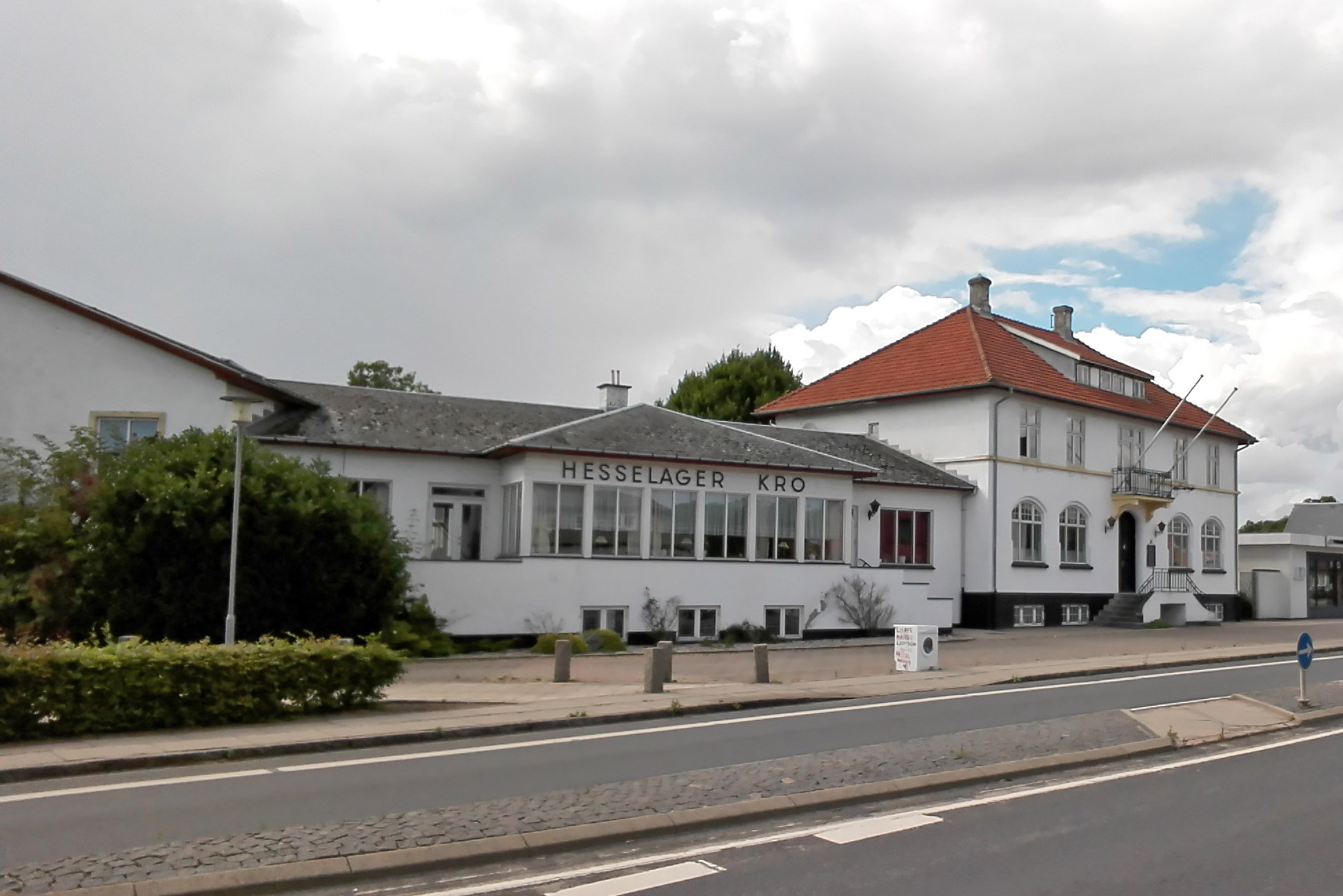
- Hesselager Inn

- Location in the Region of Southern Denmark
- Coordinates: 55°10′21″N 10°44′24″E
- Country: Denmark
- Region: Southern Denmark
- Municipality: Svendborg

Population (2026)
  - Total: 843
- Time zone: UTC+1 (CET)
  - Summer (DST): UTC+2 (CEST)

Hesselager is a small town located on the island of Funen in south-central Denmark, in Svendborg Municipality. It is located 19 km south of Nyborg, 7 km northwest of Lundeborg and 18 km northeast of Svendborg.

Close to the village stands the Damestenen (or Hesselagerstenen), the biggest glacial erratic of Denmark.
