= Ribe-Esbjerg HH =

Danish handball club

- Full name: Ribe-Esbjerg Herre Håndbold
- Short name: REHH
- Founded: 2008; 18 years ago
- Arena: Blue Water Dokken
- Capacity: 2,549
- President: Holger Refslund
- Head coach: Anders Thomsen
- League: Håndboldligaen
- 2025–26: Håndboldligaen, 9th of 14
- Club colours
Home	Away

Ribe-Esbjerg HH is a handball club based in the town of Ribe in Jutland, Denmark. The club was founded in 2008 and was the result of a merger between Ribe Håndboldklub and Sædding Guldager Idrætsforening. Ribe-Esbjerg HH competes in the men's Danish Handball League.

The official fan club is called 'Blue Vikings'.

== History ==
Ribe Håndboldklub, the progenitor club for REHH, was founded on 1 October 1956, and have played in the top division on several occasions. In the first season in the clubs history, they won their section of the Danish 2. Division and was thus promoted to the 1. division. In the 2011/2012 season the team was promoted to the top division in Denmark, Herrehåndboldligaen.

They reached the semifinals of the Danish Championship for the first time in 2016-17. They did however lose both the semifinals and the bronze match.

Until the 2026-27 season the club played both home matches at Ribe Fritidscenter in Ribe and Blue Water Dokken in Esbjerg, but due to increased requirements for commercial facilities, the club decided only to play home matches in Esbjerg.

== Team ==
=== Staff ===
Staff for the 2025–26 season

Pos.	Name
Head Coach	(Denmark) Marc Uhd
Assistant Coach	(Denmark) Ole Damgaard
Goalkeeping Coach	(Denmark) Tim Winkler
Physical Trainer	(Denmark) Torben Nielsen
Team Leader	(Denmark) Søren Pedersen
Team Leader	(Denmark) John Heinze
Team Leader	(Denmark) Per Vindfeld
Physiotherapist	(Denmark) Sidsel Riis Jørgensen
Physiotherapist	(Denmark) Søren Nielsen
Sporting Director	(Denmark) Jesper Holm

=== Current squad ===
Squad for the 2026–27 season

Goalkeeper

- 1 (Denmark) Mads Iversen
- 12 (Denmark) Salah Boutaf
- 61 (Denmark) Andreas Haagen Pytlick

Wingers
LW

- 10 (Sweden) Jerry Tollbring
- 21 (Denmark) Jacob Overgaard Andersen

RW

- 9 (Denmark) Mads Aarhus Lauridsen
- 11 (Denmark) Mathias Jørgensen (c)

Pivots

- 5 (Denmark) Rasmus Meyer Ejlersen
- 24 (Norway) Kasper Sjursen Syversen
- 25 (Denmark) Sasser Sonn

Back players
LB

- 4 (Iceland) Elvar Ásgeirsson
- 49 (Sweden) Karl Wallinius

CB

- 8 (Denmark) Oliver Sundtoft
- 14 (Sweden) Casper Käll
- 15 (Denmark) Lauritz Reinholdt Legér
- 20 (Denmark) Mads Christiansen
- 81 (Sweden) Alfred Jönsson

RB

- 19 (Norway) Benjamin Hallgren
- 26 (Denmark) Christian Termansen

=== Transfers ===
Transfers for the 2026–27 season

Joining

- (Sweden) Casper Käll (CB) from (Denmark) GOG Håndbold
- (Denmark) Salah Boutaf (GK) from (Denmark) GOG Håndbold

Leaving

- (Sweden) Niklas Kraft (GK) to (Sweden) Alingsås HK
- (Denmark) Morten Jørgensen (LW) to (Denmark) Fredericia HK
- (Denmark) Nicolaj Spanggaard (RB) to (Denmark) Skive fH
- (Denmark) Marcus Mørk (CB) (retires)
- (Faroe Islands) Teis Horn Rasmussen (P) (to (Denmark) TTH Holstebro)
