= Gudme =

- Town
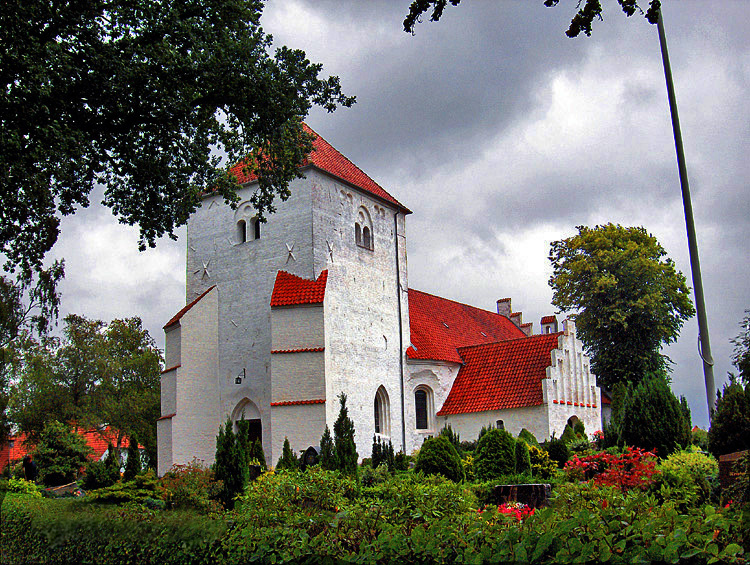
- Gudme Church

- Location in Region of Southern Denmark Gudme (Denmark)
- Coordinates: 55°08′58″N 10°42′17″E
- Country: Denmark
- Region: Southern Denmark
- Municipality: Svendborg Municipality

Population (2026)
  - Total: 916
- Time zone: UTC+1 (CET)
  - Summer (DST): UTC+2 (CEST)

Gudme is a town in southern Denmark with a population of 916 (1 January 2026), located in Svendborg municipality on the island of Funen in Region of Southern Denmark. Until 1 January 2007, it was the site of the municipal council of the now former Gudme municipality.

== History ==
Gudme was an important site during the Iron Age. Numerous archeological finds dating from the 3rd to the 6th century have been made here; they include large amounts of gold treasure and the remains of what is assumed to have been a royal palace. Bracteates were produced at the site during that period, indicating a shamanic culture in Gudme. The name of the town means "gods' home", leading to the assumption that it was an important religious site as well.

== Sports ==
Gudme is most famous for its handball team, GOG Gudme, which is one of the most successful teams ever in Denmark.

== Notable people ==
- Hannibal Sehested (1842 in Gudme – 1924) a Danish landowner and Council President (Denmark) 1900/1901
- Søren Torpegaard Lund a Danish actor and singer born 1998
