= Landet =

- Town
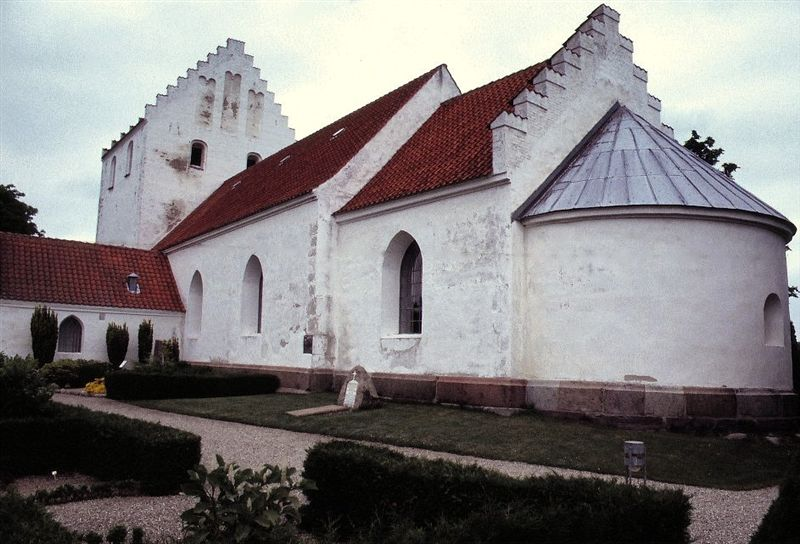
- Landet church

- Location in the Region of Southern Denmark
- Coordinates: 54°59′53″N 10°35′50″E
- Country: Denmark
- Region: Southern Denmark
- Municipality: Svendborg

Population (2026)
  - Total: 298
- Time zone: UTC+1 (CET)
  - Summer (DST): UTC+2 (CEST)

Landet is a small town located on the island of Tåsinge in south-central Denmark, in Svendborg Municipality. It is located one kilometer west of Lundby, five kilometers south of Vindeby and nine kilometers south of Svendborg.

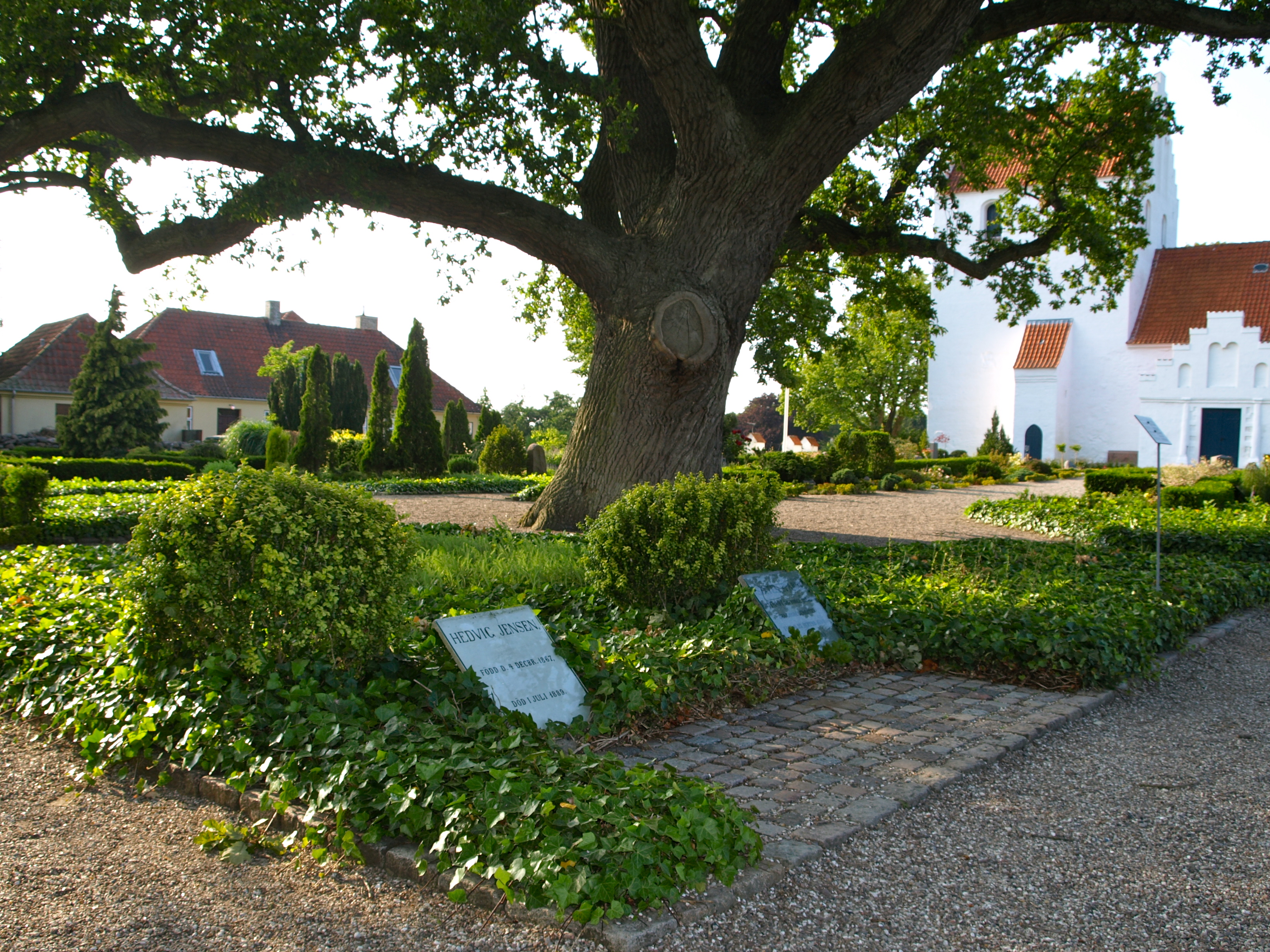
Elvira Madigan and Sixten Sparre's graves at Landet Cemetery.
