= Bjerreby =

- Town
- Location in the Region of Southern Denmark
- Coordinates: 54°58′10″N 10°36′29″E
- Country: Denmark
- Region: Southern Denmark
- Municipality: Svendborg

Population (2026)
  - Total: 341
- Time zone: UTC+1 (CET)
  - Summer (DST): UTC+2 (CEST)

Bjerreby is a small town located on the island of Tåsinge in south-central Denmark, in Svendborg Municipality. It is located three kilometers south of Lundby, 12 kilometers south of Svendborg and 10 kilometers west of Rudkøbing.
