= Bregninge =

Bregninge may refer to:

- Bregninge, Svendborg Municipality, a village on the island of Tåsinge, Denmark
  - Bregninge Kirke, a church on Tåsinge, and Bregninge Hill, the location of the church
- Bregninge Church, Ærø, Denmark
- Bregninge School, a listed building in Guldborgsund Municipality, Denmark
