= Geography of Denmark =

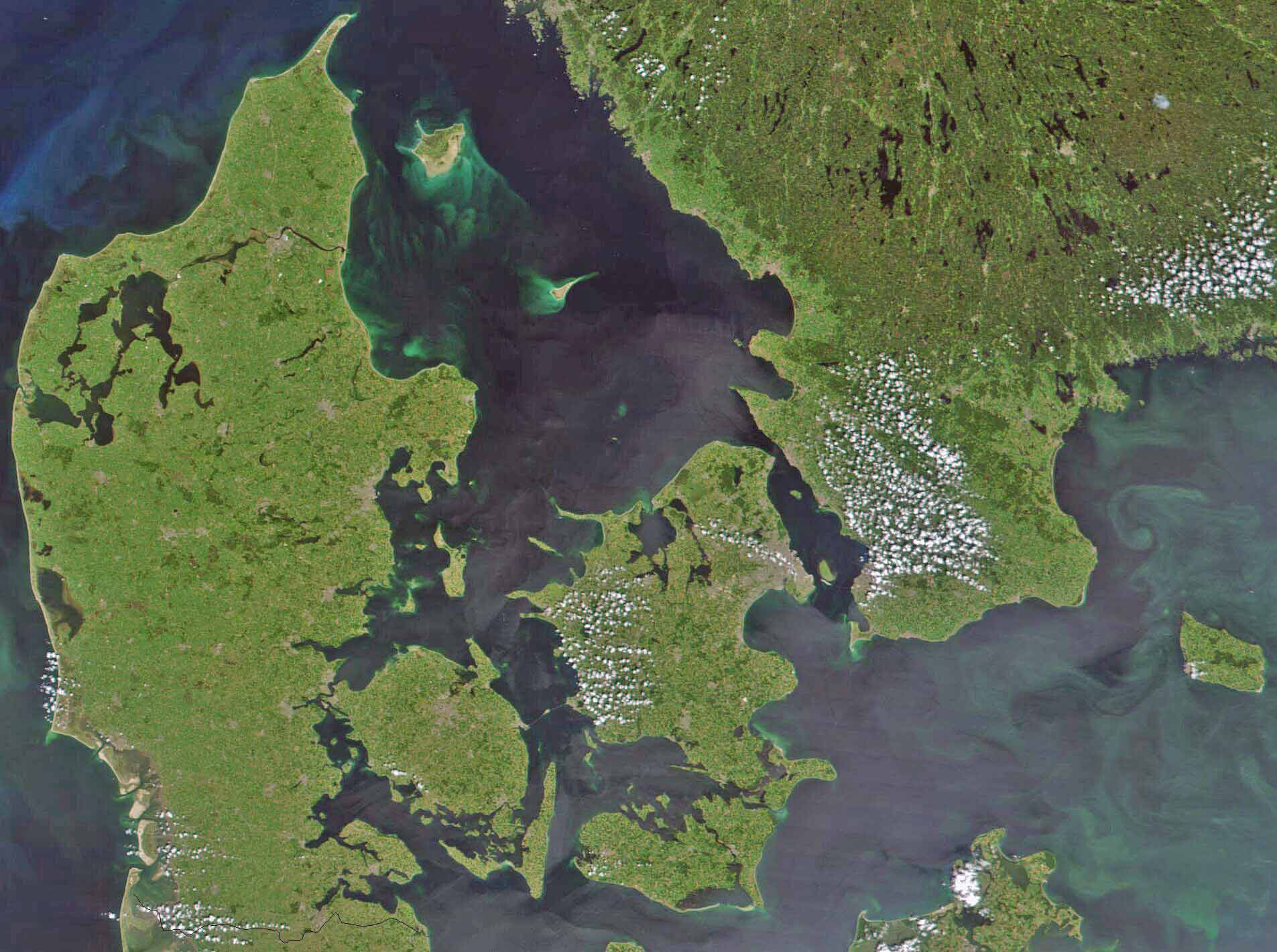
- Continent: Europe
- Region: Northern Europe (Scandinavia)
- Coordinates: 56°00′N 10°00′E
- Area
  - Total: 43,094 km^{2} (16,639 sq mi)
  - Land: 98%
  - Water: 2%
- Coastline: 8,750 km (5,440 mi)
- Borders: Total land borders: 68 km
- Highest point: Møllehøj; 171 m
- Lowest point: Lammefjord -7 m
- Longest river: Gudenå; 149 km
- Largest lake: Arresø; 40.72 km^{2}
- Exclusive economic zone: 105,989 km^{2} (40,923 mi^{2}) (excludes the Faroe Islands and Greenland)

Denmark is a Nordic country located in Northern Europe. It consists of the Jutland Peninsula and several islands in the Baltic Sea, referred to as the Danish Archipelago. Denmark is located southwest of Sweden and due south of Norway and is bordered by the German state (and former possession) Schleswig-Holstein to the south, with a 68-kilometre (42-mile) long land border.

Denmark borders both the Baltic and North seas along its 8,750 km (5,440 mi) tidal shoreline. Denmark's general coastline is much shorter, at 1,701 km (1,057 mi), as it would not include most of the 1,419 offshore islands (each defined as exceeding 100 square metres (1,100 sq ft) in area) and the 180-kilometre long (110 mi) Limfjorden, which separates Denmark's second largest island, North Jutlandic Island, 4,686 km^{2} (1,809 sq mi) in size, from the rest of Jutland. No location in Denmark is further from the coast than 52 km (32 mi). The land area of Denmark is estimated to be 43,094 km^{2} (16,639 mi^{2}). However, it cannot be stated exactly since the ocean constantly erodes and adds material to the coastline, and there are human land reclamation projects. On the southwest coast of Jutland, the tide is between 1 and 2 m (3.28 and 6.56 ft), and the tideline moves outward and inward on a 10 km (6.2 mi) stretch. A recent global remote sensing analysis suggested that there were 607 km^{2} (234 sq mi) of tidal flats in Denmark, making it the 42nd ranked country in terms of tidal flat extent. Denmark has an Exclusive Economic Zone of 105,989 km^{2} (40,923 mi^{2}). When including the Faroe Islands and Greenland, the EEZ is the 15th largest in the world with 2,220,093 km^{2} (857,183 mi^{2}).

A circle enclosing the same total area as Denmark would have a diameter of 234 km (146 miles). Denmark has 443 named islands (1,419 islands above 100 m^{2} (1,100 sq ft)), of which 72 are inhabited (as of 1 January 2007, Statistics Denmark). The largest islands are Zealand (Sjælland) and Funen (Fyn). The island of Bornholm is located east of the rest of the country, in the Baltic Sea. Many of the larger islands are connected by bridges; the Øresund Bridge connects Zealand with Sweden; the Great Belt Bridge connects Funen with Zealand; and the Little Belt Bridge connects Jutland with Funen. Ferries or small aircraft connect to the smaller islands. Main cities are the capital Copenhagen on Zealand; Århus, Aalborg and Esbjerg in Jutland; and Odense on Funen.

Denmark experiences a temperate climate, with mild, windy winters and cool summers. The local terrain is generally flat with a few gently rolling plains. The territory of Denmark includes the island of Bornholm in the Baltic Sea and the rest of metropolitan Denmark, but excludes the Faroe Islands and Greenland. Its position gives Denmark complete control of the Danish Straits (Skagerrak and Kattegat) linking the Baltic and North Seas. The country's natural resources include petroleum, natural gas, fish, salt, limestone, chalk, stone, gravel, and sand.

== Environment ==
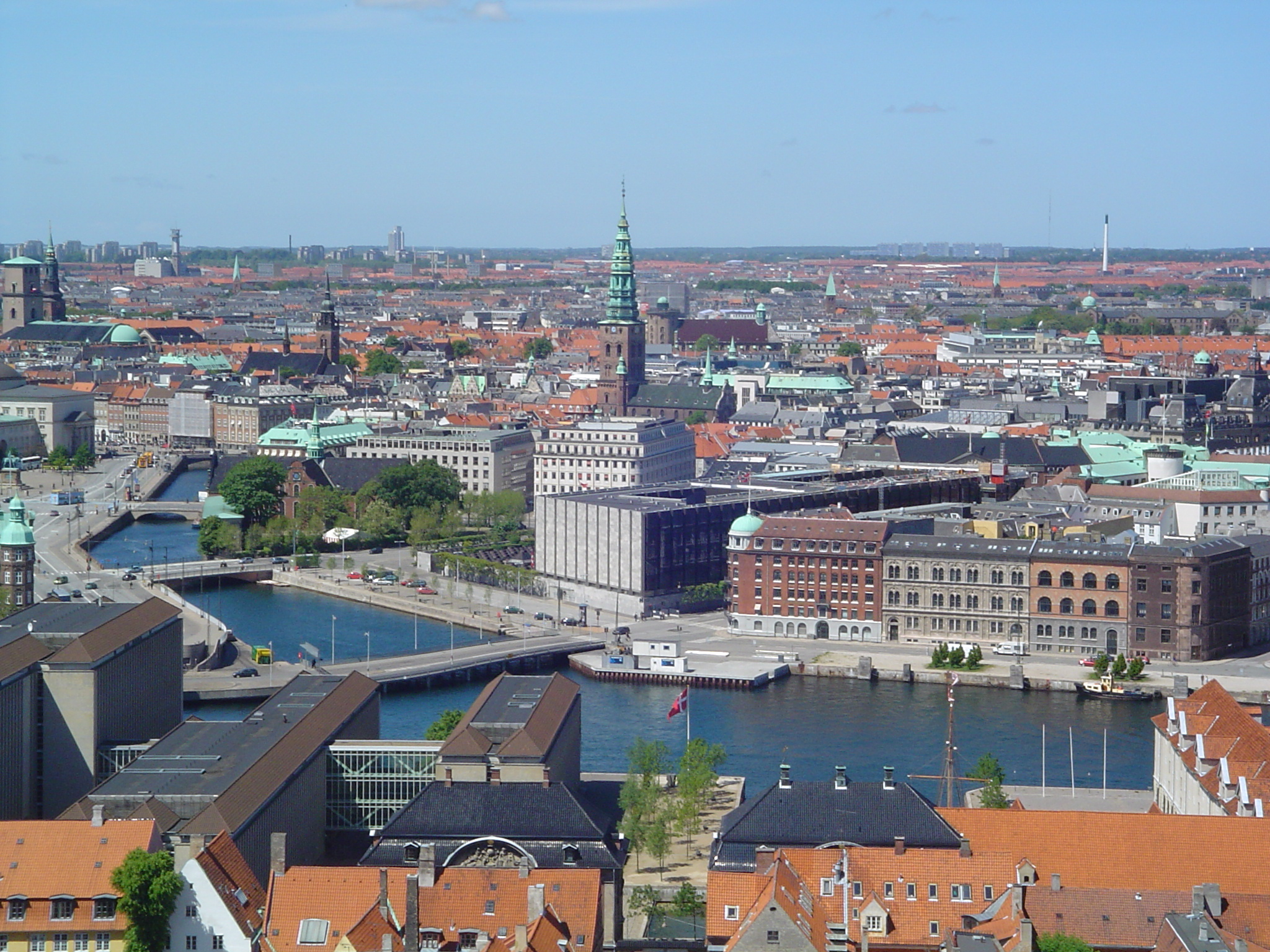
Denmark is highly urbanised. Here Greater Copenhagen in the capital region.

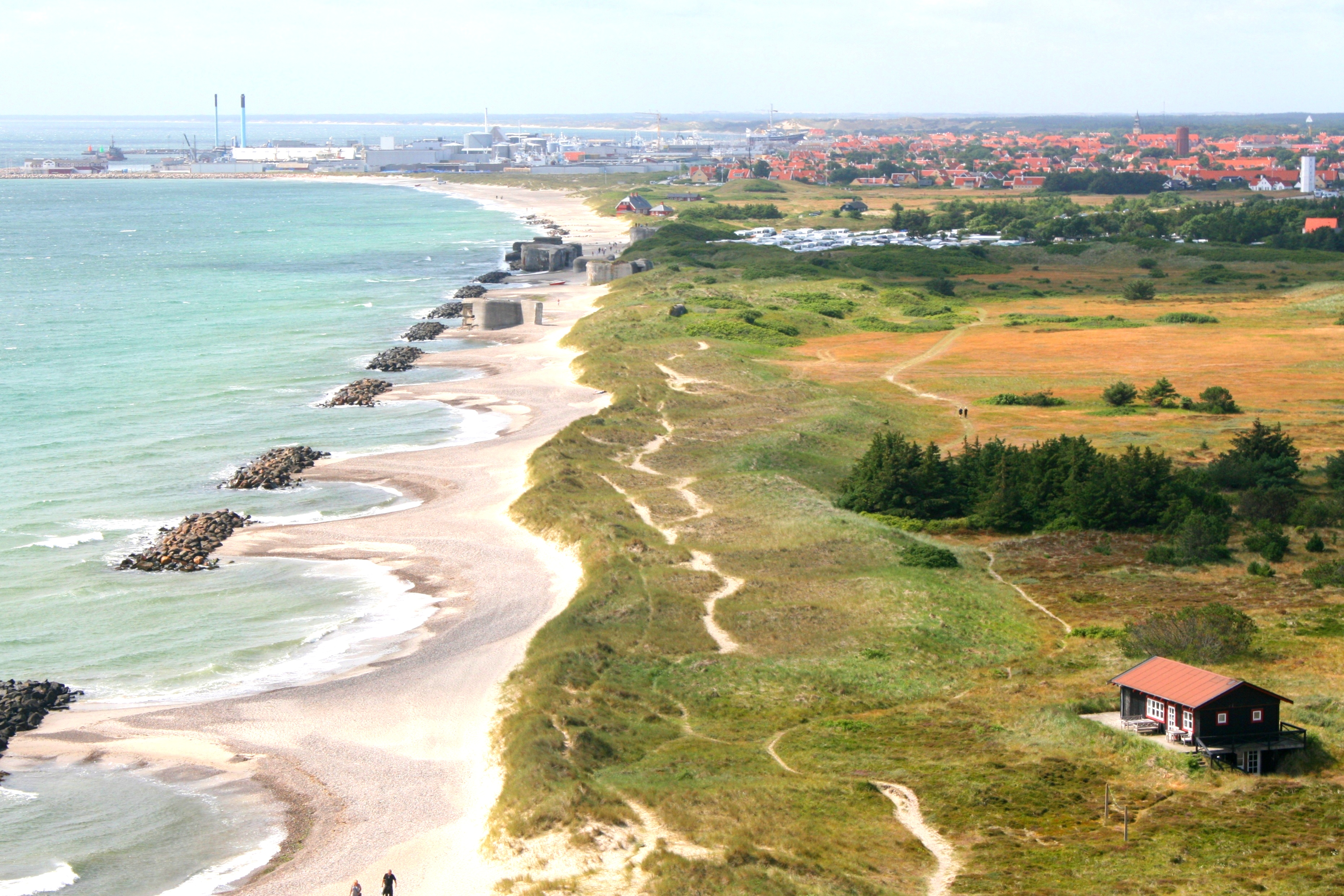
The Danish landscape is characterised by flat, arable land and sandy coasts.

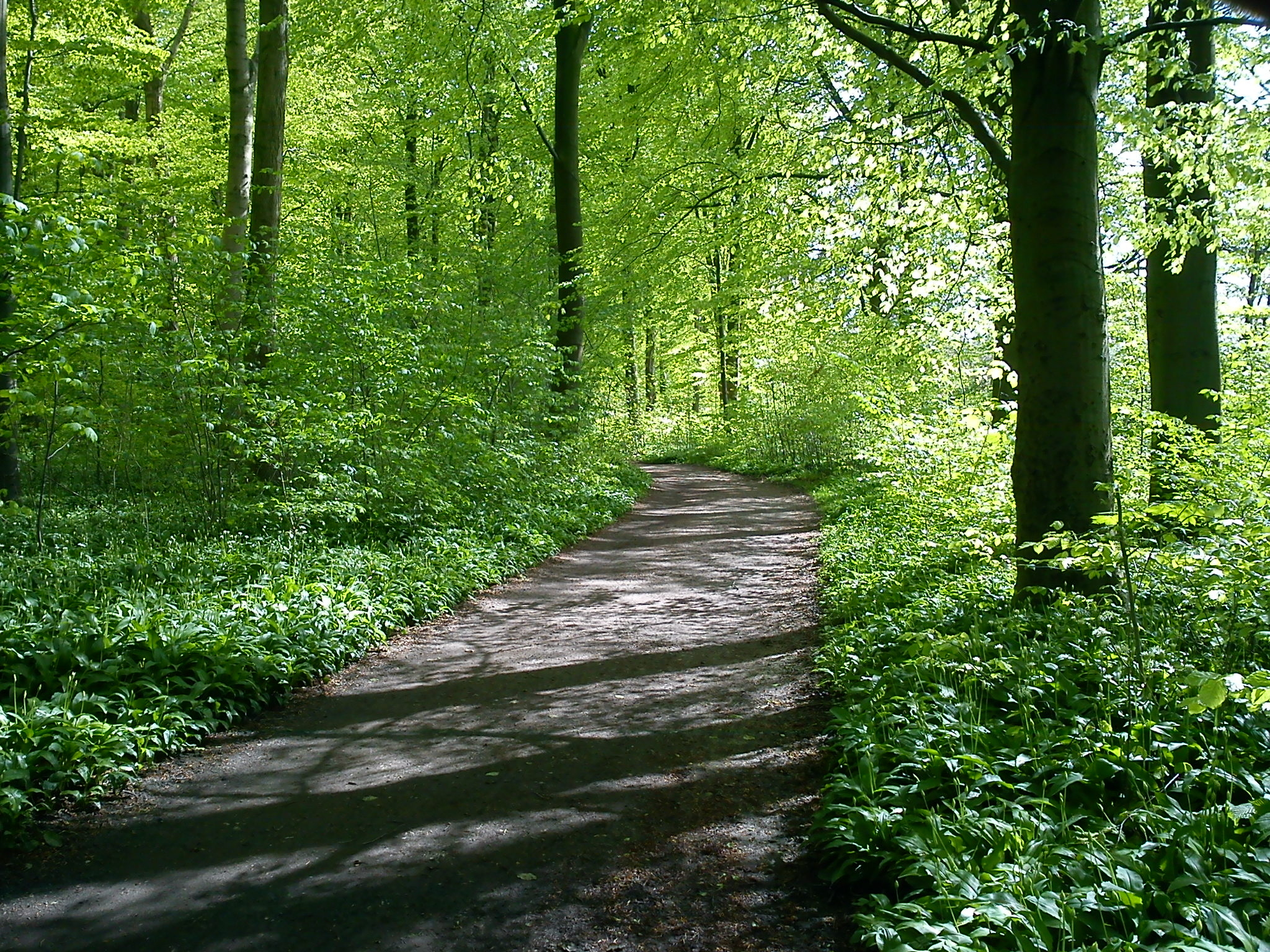
Beech is a common tree throughout Denmark's sparse woodlands.

=== Climate ===
Climate chart of Copenhagen.

Climate of Denmark according to the Köppen climate classification.

Climate data for Denmark (2001–2010)
Month	Jan	Feb	Mar	Apr	May	Jun	Jul	Aug	Sep	Oct	Nov	Dec	Year
Mean daily maximum °C (°F)	3.3 (37.9)	3.3 (37.9)	6.1 (43.0)	11.5 (52.7)	15.5 (59.9)	18.5 (65.3)	21.6 (70.9)	21.2 (70.2)	17.5 (63.5)	12.3 (54.1)	7.9 (46.2)	4.2 (39.6)	11.9 (53.4)
Daily mean °C (°F)	1.5 (34.7)	1.2 (34.2)	3.0 (37.4)	7.5 (45.5)	11.4 (52.5)	14.6 (58.3)	17.4 (63.3)	17.2 (63.0)	13.8 (56.8)	9.4 (48.9)	5.7 (42.3)	2.2 (36.0)	8.8 (47.8)
Mean daily minimum °C (°F)	−0.8 (30.6)	−1.3 (29.7)	−0.2 (31.6)	3.6 (38.5)	7.4 (45.3)	10.6 (51.1)	13.4 (56.1)	13.5 (56.3)	10.2 (50.4)	6.2 (43.2)	3.2 (37.8)	−0.3 (31.5)	5.5 (41.9)
Average precipitation mm (inches)	66 (2.6)	50 (2.0)	43 (1.7)	37 (1.5)	53 (2.1)	68 (2.7)	77 (3.0)	91 (3.6)	62 (2.4)	83 (3.3)	75 (3.0)	61 (2.4)	765 (30.1)
Average rainy days (≥ 1 millimetre (0.039 in))	18	15	13	11	13	13	14	16	14	17	20	17	181
Mean monthly sunshine hours	47	71	146	198	235	239	232	196	162	111	58	45	1,739
Source: Danmarks Meteorologiske Institut

Climate data for Denmark (extremes, most 1961-1990)
Month	Jan	Feb	Mar	Apr	May	Jun	Jul	Aug	Sep	Oct	Nov	Dec	Year
Record high °C (°F)	11.8 (53.2)	15.8 (60.4)	22.2 (72.0)	26.2 (79.2)	31.0 (87.8)	35.9 (96.6)	35.9 (96.6)	36.4 (97.5)	29.8 (85.6)	24.0 (75.2)	19.6 (67.3)	13.0 (55.4)	36.4 (97.5)
Record low °C (°F)	−31.2 (−24.2)	−29.0 (−20.2)	−27.0 (−16.6)	−12.1 (10.2)	−6.0 (21.2)	−1.6 (29.1)	1.0 (33.8)	−0.1 (31.8)	−4.4 (24.1)	−9.0 (15.8)	−19.0 (−2.2)	−25.6 (−14.1)	−31.2 (−24.2)

=== Land use ===
Arable land: 55.99% Permanent crops: 0.14% Other: 42.87% (2012)

Irrigated land: 4,354 km^{2} (1,681 sq mi) (2007)

Total renewable water resources: 6 km^{3} (1.4 cu mi) (2011)

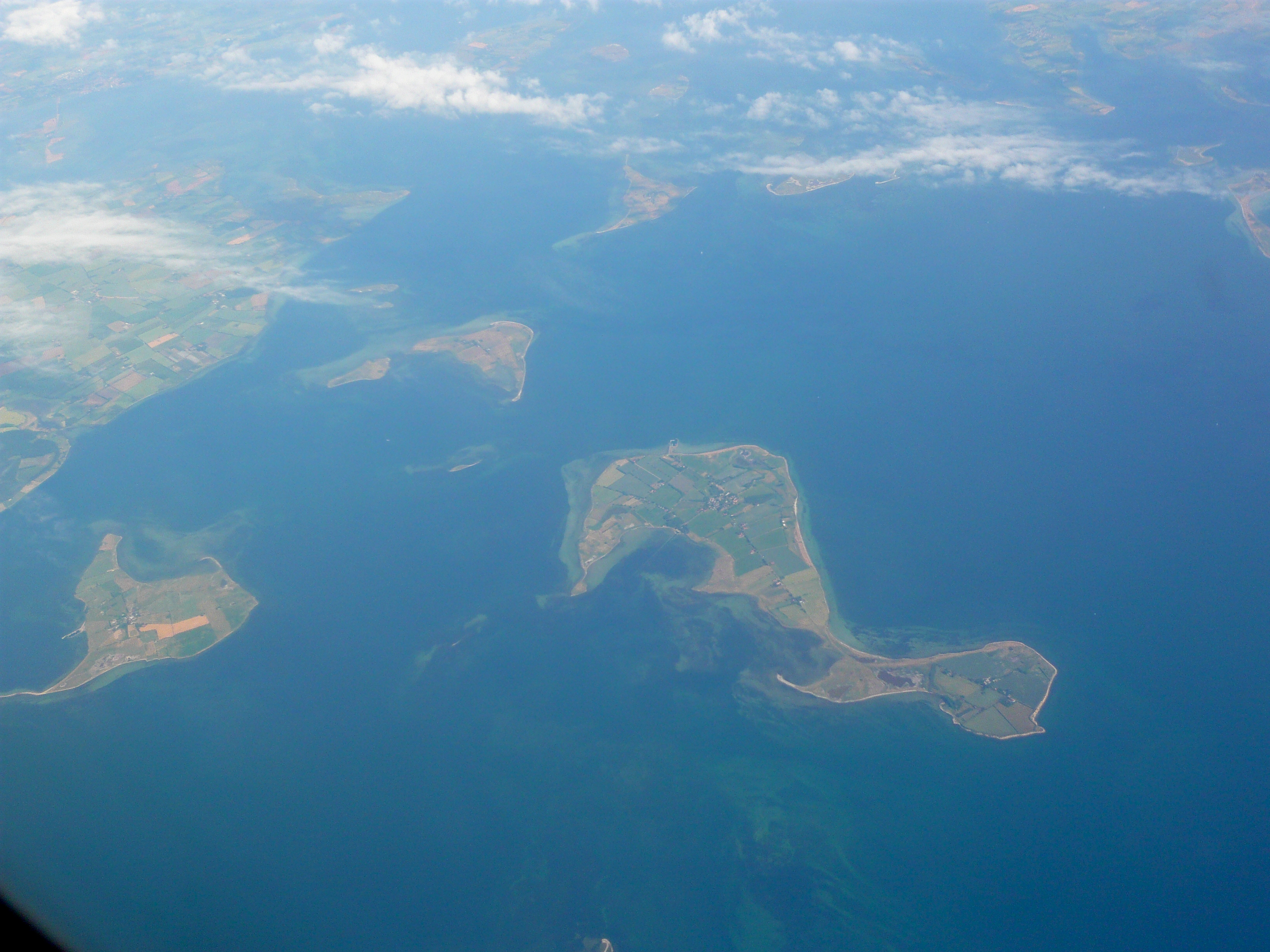
Drejø, Hjortø and Skarø seen from above. There are about 409 named Danish islands and around 70 of them are inhabited.

Freshwater withdrawal (domestic/industrial/agricultural):
total: 0.66 km^{3}/a (0.16 cu mi/a) (58%/5%/36%)
per capita: 118.4 m^{3}/a (4,180 cu ft/a) (2009)

=== Land reclamation ===
In 2019, the government proposed building 9 new artificial islands, named project Holmene, which would create 3 km^{2} (1.2 sq mi) of reclaimed land, to be built from 2022 to 2040.

In June 2021, lawmakers approved the construction of a 3 km^{2} (1.2 sq mi) island, named Lynetteholm, in the Copenhagen Harbor. A spokesperson for the Climate Movement in Denmark (Klimabevægelsen i Danmark) said the organization would sue the government over environmental concerns.

=== Agriculture ===
Denmark has plenty of rain, flat landscape, and moderate climate. With 55.99% of its land considered as arable, Denmark has model characteristics for agriculture. 61% of the country's total area is cultivated Farms in Denmark are remarkably large, averaging 70.0 hectares (172.9 acres) per farm. Additionally, homesteads exceeding 100 hectares (247 acres) make up more than 20% in Denmark. Many of these large farms harvest fruits and vegetables, the leading exports from Denmark are meat, fur, and dairy products. The animal's diets in Denmark consist of mainly cereals since they are the dominant field crop. 75% of all cereal produced in Denmark is feed to the four most produced animals which are pigs, cattle, chicken and mink. Denmark overproduces about 66% of food production compared to their own population size (5.7 million) being that they are able to feed 15 million people. This is a byproduct of being highly productive within the Danish agricultural production.

In 1961, Denmark's Agricultural land represented 74.5% of land area. Fifty-six years later to 2015, Denmark has decreased its amount of Agricultural land down to 62.1% then to 61% one year later in reference to "Facts and Figures - Danish Agriculture and Food" The decrease in agricultural land comes as farmers are being well educated and the intensive amount of research and development is being implemented. It begins with advancements in agro-technology. The results have improved fertilization and nutrient use on arable land. Digestibility and nutrient uptake are developing from the improvements of new methods that are being implemented. Examples of these new methods are the addition of enzymes and microbial cultures.

=== Natural hazards ===
- Flooding is a threat in some areas of the country

=== Current issues ===
- Air pollution, principally from vehicle and power plant emissions
- Nitrogen and phosphorus pollution of the North Sea
- Drinking and surface water becoming polluted from animal wastes and pesticides. Drinking water is very safe to drink, even though Denmark, unlike most countries, has almost no cleaning of drinking water

=== International agreements ===
- Party to: Air Pollution, Air Pollution-Nitrogen Oxides,
  Air Pollution-Sulphur 85, Air Pollution-Sulphur 94, Air Pollution-Volatile Organic Compounds, Antarctic Treaty, Biodiversity, Climate Change, Desertification, Endangered Species, Environmental Modification, Hazardous Wastes, Law of the Sea, Marine Dumping, Marine Life Conservation, Nuclear Test Ban, Ozone Layer Protection, Ship Pollution, Tropical Timber 83, Tropical Timber 94, Wetlands, Whaling
- Signed, but not ratified: Air Pollution-Persistent Organic Pollutants, Antarctic-Environmental Protocol, Climate Change-Kyoto Protocol

== Transnational issues ==
=== Maritime claims ===
Map showing the location of Denmark including the Faroe Islands and Greenland (pdf), collectively known as the Danish Realm.

- Contiguous zone: 24 nmi (44.4 km; 27.6 mi)
- Continental shelf: 200 m (660 ft) depth or to the depth of exploitation
- Exclusive economic zone: 105,989 km^{2} (40,923 mi^{2}) (excludes Greenland and Faroe Islands). 200 nmi (370.4 km; 230.2 mi)
- Territorial sea: 12 nmi (22.2 km; 13.8 mi)

=== Other issues ===
- Iceland disputes the Faroe Islands' fisheries median line.
- Iceland, Ireland and the United Kingdom dispute Denmark's claim that the Faroe Islands' continental shelf extends beyond 200 nautical miles or about 370 km.
- The Faroe Islands continue to study proposals for full independence.
- Denmark is currently investigating the extent of the continental shelf of Greenland, in the hope that Greenland's Exclusive Economic Zone can be expanded. One of the areas investigated is the geographical North Pole.

== Population ==
=== Urban population ===
- Denmark's urban population accounts for 87.9% of its total population, with a 0.51% rate of change in urbanization. Copenhagen remains the largest city in Denmark with a population of 1.2 million people and a metro population of 1.99 million. Copenhagen became Denmark's capital in 1443 and now currently sits with a population density of 6,800 per square kilometre (18,000/sq mi).
- About a quarter of Danes live in the capital Copenhagen.

== See also ==
- Danish Realm
- ISO 3166-2:DK
- List of islands of Denmark
- NUTS statistical regions of Denmark
- UN/LOCODE:DK

== Notes ==
=== References ===
- The World Book Encyclopedia (2003 ed.). World Book. 1974. ISBN 0716601036.
