= Vindeby =

Vindeby (German: Windeby) may also refer to:

== Denmark ==
- Vindeby, Svendborg Municipality, a settlement in Bregninge Parish, on Tåsinge
- Vindeby, a settlement in Lindelse Parish, Langeland Municipality on Langeland
- Vindeby, a settlement in Vindeby Parish, Lolland Municipality on Lolland
- Vindeby Offshore Wind Farm, off the coast of Lolland

== Germany ==
- Windeby, a municipality in the district of Rendsburg-Eckernförde, in Schleswig-Holstein, Germany
