= Elvira Madigan =

Tightrope walker and trick rider

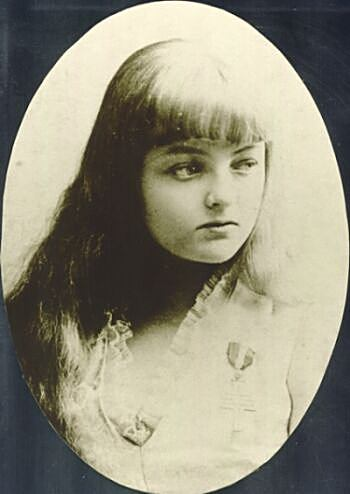
- Elvira Madigan.
- Born: Hedvig Antoinette Isabella Eleonore Jensen; 4 December 1867; Flensburg, Schleswig-Holstein, Kingdom of Prussia
- Died: 19 July 1889 (aged 21); Tåsinge, Denmark
- Occupation: Circus performer
- Parent(s): Frederik Peter Jensen (father); Eleonora Cecilie Christine Marie Olsen (mother)

Hedvig Antoinette Isabella Eleonore Jensen (4 December 1867 – 19 July 1889), better known by her stage name Elvira Madigan, was a circus performer who performed as a slack rope dancer, artistic rider, juggler and dancer. She is best known today for her romantic relationship with the Swedish nobleman and cavalry officer Sixten Sparre, who most likely murdered her before committing suicide. Their joint death caused great sensation and the event was described in song by, among others, the author Johan Lindström Saxon in a song beginning "Sad things happen", which gained great popularity.

== Early life ==
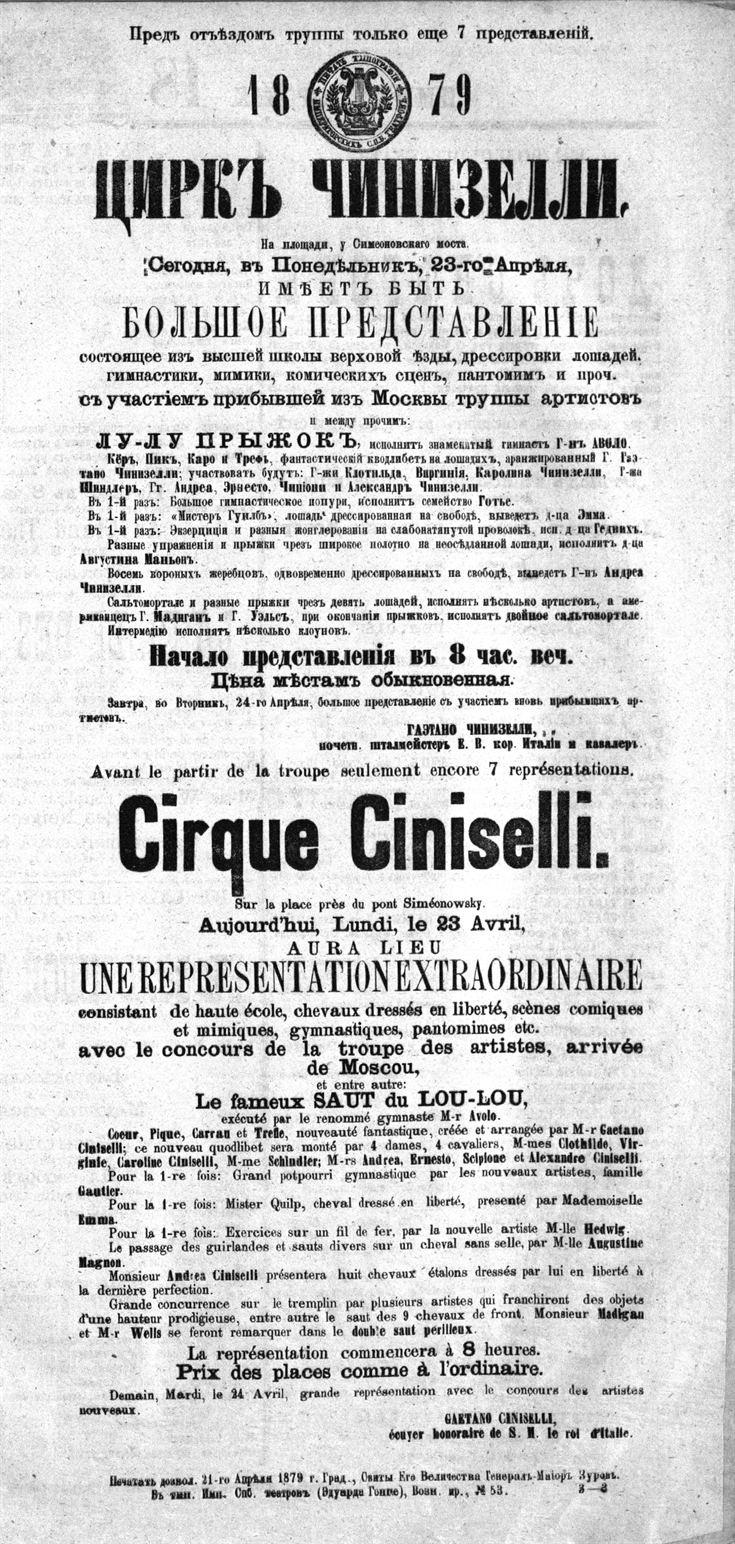
The poster from Elvira Madigan's debut as a slack line dancer in St. Petersburg on 23 April 1879

Hedvig Antoinette Isabella Eleonore Jensen was born on 4 December 1867 in Flensburg, Schleswig-Holstein, then in the Kingdom of Prussia. It is often stated that Elvira Madigan was Danish, but uncertainty prevails over which should be considered her home country as well as her citizenship.

Her mother, Eleonora Cecilie Christine Marie Olsen, was a circus artist born in Finland and was of Norwegian ancestry. She was later known as Laura Madigan (1849–1918) but during Elvira's childhood she mostly used the stage name Miss Ulbinska. Elvira's father, circus artist Frederik Peter Jensen, was born in 1845 in Copenhagen, Denmark. His later destiny is unknown.

At the time of Elvira Madigan's birth in 1867 her parents were not married to each other; they toured with the French circus director Didier Gautier's "Cirque du Nord" in Germany and Denmark. During the years 1869–1872 Elvira's mother toured with Circus Renz in Germany and Austria, where she in 1871 gave birth to Elvira's half-brother Richard Heinrich Olsen in Berlin. He later toured with the stage name Oscar Madigan. The father of this child is unknown. In 1875, Elvira's mother worked at Circus Myers in Austria, where she got to know the American circus artist John Madigan, whom she subsequently lived with. The following year Elvira Madigan, then still Hedvig Jensen, made her debut in the circus, a pas-de-deux with John Madigan during a performance with the circus Loisset in Tivoli Gardens in Copenhagen. After the death of Loisset in Norrköping the following year, his circus was dissolved, and the Madigan family moved to Circus Ciniselli in Russia. There Elvira Madigan trained to be a slack line dancer.

=== Career ===
In the summer of 1879, the Madigan family tried to run their own small circus company in Finland and at the same time Hedvig began using the name Elvira Madigan. The following year, when the family appeared in Circus Cremes in Vienna, Gisela Brož became a foster child in the family, she was two years older than Elvira. Gisela was trained as a tightrope dancer, and together with Elvira on slack line they practiced a unique number, where they appeared simultaneously on separate lines, one above the other. Elvira used to juggle at the same time as she was on the line. The number became a sensation, and in the following years the girls appeared as "daughters of the air" in circuses and in variety rooms across much of Europe, including in Berlin, Paris, London, Brussels and Moscow. After an appearance at Tivoli Gardens in Copenhagen in 1886 before the Danish royal family, the girls were each awarded a gold cross by King Christian IX. The following year, John Madigan again started his own circus company, this time in Denmark. Gisela left the family in the autumn of the same year, after which Elvira had to appear alone when the tour continued to Sweden.

== Relationship with Sixten Sparre ==
In January 1888, circus Madigan appeared in Kristianstad, where she was seen by the dragoon lieutenant Sixten Sparre.

=== Letter exchange ===
Sixten Sparre, who was married and had two children, fell madly in love with Madigan, who was considered an extraordinary beauty, with an excellent figure and almost meter-long blond hair. Sparre sought her out, and the two started a correspondence. Madigan gradually tired of his writing, and several times tried to end their correspondence. Sparre, however, tried to persuade her to leave both her family and the circus to marry him. According to a letter that Elvira's mother later wrote to the Danish newspaper Politiken, Sparre threatened to shoot himself if Madigan did not do as he wanted. He also lied to her about his marital and financial status; he had squandered his entire fortune and was heavily in debt. After suffering a nervous breakdown, Madigan finally gave in; on 28 May 1889, she secretly left her family at the circus's stop in Sundsvall. Her family was unaware of her correspondence with Sparre.

=== Relationship development ===
Sparre, who was granted two months leave from 27 May, met Madigan in Bollnäs. The two went on to Stockholm, where Madigan's mother made a failed attempt to catch the couple by taking a steamboat from Sundsvall. After a few weeks in an unknown place, they arrived at Svendborg on Funen on 18 June. They lived almost a month at the city hotel, but when the hotel director presented a bill, the couple fled. The already heavily indebted Sparre was completely broke at this point and had been living on credit for several weeks. The two lived a few days in a guest house in Troense on Tåsinge, Denmark. On 18 July, they went to the nearby forest area Nørreskov, where Sparre shot Elvira with his service revolver and then killed himself on the morning of 19 July 1889. Their bodies were found three days later. In Madigan's dress pocket was found a paper with a poem that she had written herself just before her death. The poem was written in a mixture of Swedish, Danish, Norwegian and German.

A drop fell into the water,
faded out slowly.
And the place where it fell
surrounded from wave to wave.
What was it that fell?
and where did it come from?
It was but a life,
and but a death that came
to win itself a track.
– - –
† Now the water rests once again.
Hedvig

=== Funeral ===
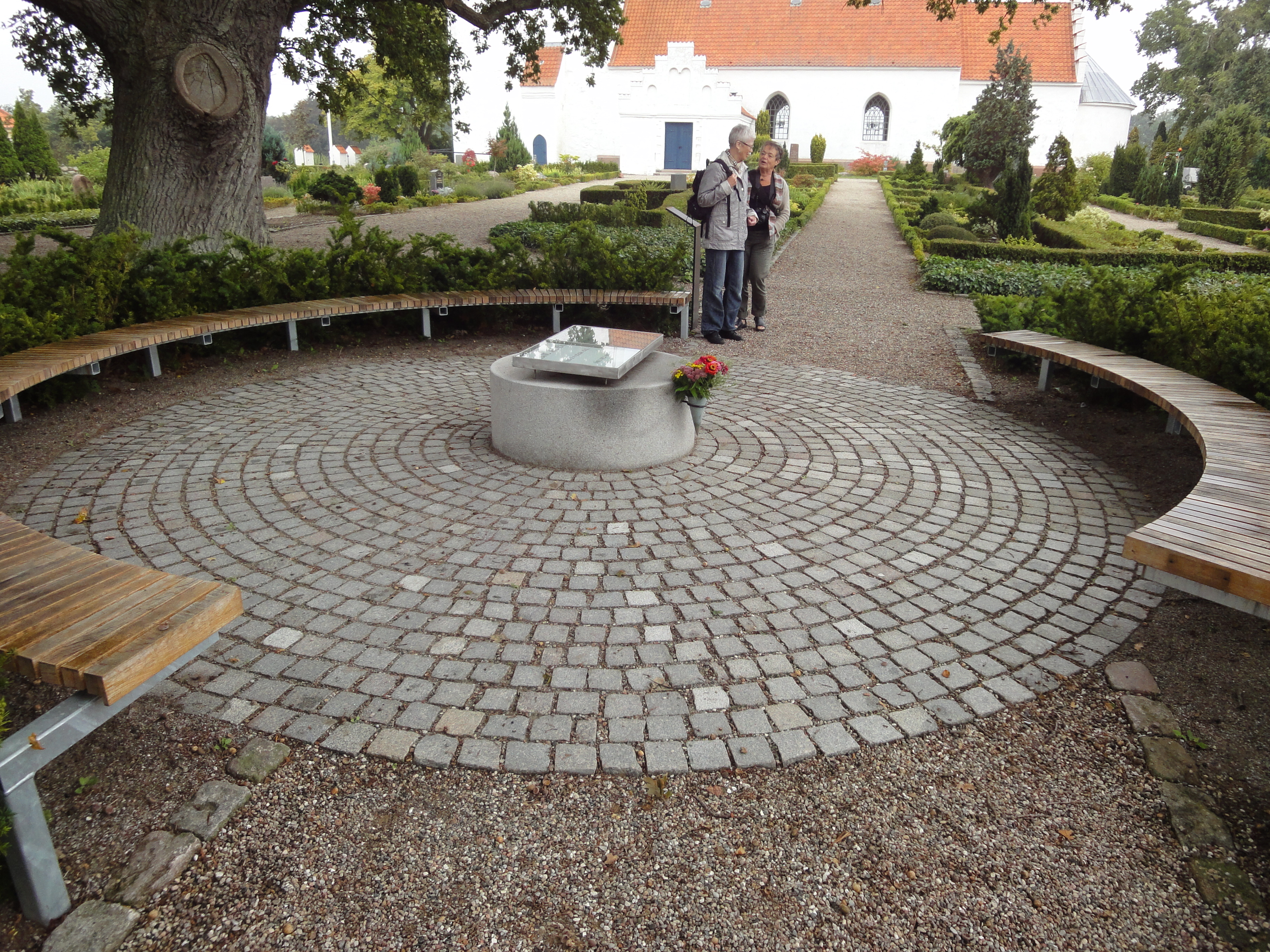
Elvira Madigan and Sixten Sparre's burial ground at Landet cemetery after the transformation in 2013.

The couple were buried at Landet's cemetery in the middle of Tåsinge on 27 July in the presence of a large number of locals and summer guests. The hotel bills, funeral costs and tombstones were paid for by Sparre's brother, Edvard. Madigan's grandmother came to oversee the funeral, but she did not arrive in time. The original tombstones are of two different materials. Madigan's is of white marble and Sparre's of dark grey granite. The difference was to mark that the two were not a "genuine" couple.

The original burial ground is located a few meters south of the great oak in the middle of the cemetery, but during a reorganization of the cemetery walkways in 1943, the gravestones were moved a few meters to the southeast and turned to the west. The original gravestones were replaced by new ones on the 75th anniversary in 1964. On Madigan's new gravestone her stage name was also mentioned. In 1999, the original tombstones were restored and re-used, but now turned east and moved a few meters eastward. In 2013, the memorial site was redesigned again and the tombstones were placed close to each other in the middle of a circular pavement located near the 1999 memorial site.

== Legacy ==
The interpretation of the murder drama that was told was a love story and became to many a symbol of romantic love. It was about a circus princess who was courted by a nobleman, in a combination of morality and entertainment. The event, in its turn, brought a tremendous look, and promptly gave rise to poetry and poems. Johan Lindström Saxon's broadside ballad was heard throughout the Nordic countries from the autumn of 1889 and for many decades to come. Everyone knew the story, and everyone could sing the song. But it was not just Barrel organists that conveyed the story, also the newspapers were full of up-to-date descriptions, even with terrible details.

The couple's relationship also gave rise to an intense press debate. The conservative press condemned the couple's actions and Sparre's adultery, while the liberal press was more understanding. The event was interpreted as saying that the couple had to take this step because of the class society of the time and the prevailing sexual morality. Among other things, the Danish author Holger Drachmann wrote the tribute poem "Til de to" (To the two) under these premises. The event was seen as a repetition of the Mayerling incident, but the extent to which the two were influenced by this event is unclear. Already in the first press releases on the drama, this connection to the event in Austria was made six months earlier, and other newspapers continued to spin on this thread, perhaps mostly because this version was what the readers wanted: the all-consuming love, stronger than death, in addition, between a man of noble birth and a woman of very humble lineage (circus performers stood very low on the social scale). This romanticized view of the drama has survived to the present day through movies, novels, musicals and much more.

However, recent years of research give a different picture. It has emerged that Sparre in the last few years of his life lived very extravagantly. He had wasted his fortune and systematically withdrew debts in a way that gave rise to questions about his mental health. According to Grönqvist, he may have suffered from bipolar disorder, and his systematic waste, his renunciation of the family and the values his social class traditionally represented (Sparre posed far left politically in the last few years), and finally the love affair with Madigan should then be seen as the rash of his illness. Lindhe maintained that Sparre was spoiled, wasteful and narcissistic; she also condemned Sparre's wife Luitgard.

Contemporaries remembered Madigan as having been shy and withdrawn. She had been interested in poetry and literature, and was a good amateur pianist.

== In culture ==
In 1943, Åke Ohberg directed the first Swedish film version of Elvira Madigan with Eva Henning and himself in the lead roles. After pressure from relatives of Sixten Sparre, his name was changed to Christian.

In 1967, Bo Widerberg made his film adaptation, Elvira Madigan, with Pia Degermark and Thommy Berggren in the lead roles. The film music used throughout was the second movement from Mozart's Piano Concerto No. 21 in C major (K. 467), which has subsequently sometimes been referred to as the "Elvira Madigan" concerto. The same year, Poul Erik Møller Pedersen also directed a Danish film, with Anne Mette Michaelsen in the title role as Elvira Madigan and Søren Svejstrup as Sixten Sparre.

In 1990, the "Circus Elvira Madigan" by Jan Wirén and Lars-Åke von Vultée premiered in connection with that year's edition of the Kristianstad Days. Directed by Hasse Alfredson and among others Johan Ulveson was in the cast.

The road on which the country church is located was named Elvira Madigans Vej in 1970; a ship was also bestowed with her name.

Sparre has a street named after him in the regiment area of Ystad, Sixten Sparres Gata.

== See also ==
- Gisela Brož
