= Svendborgsund =

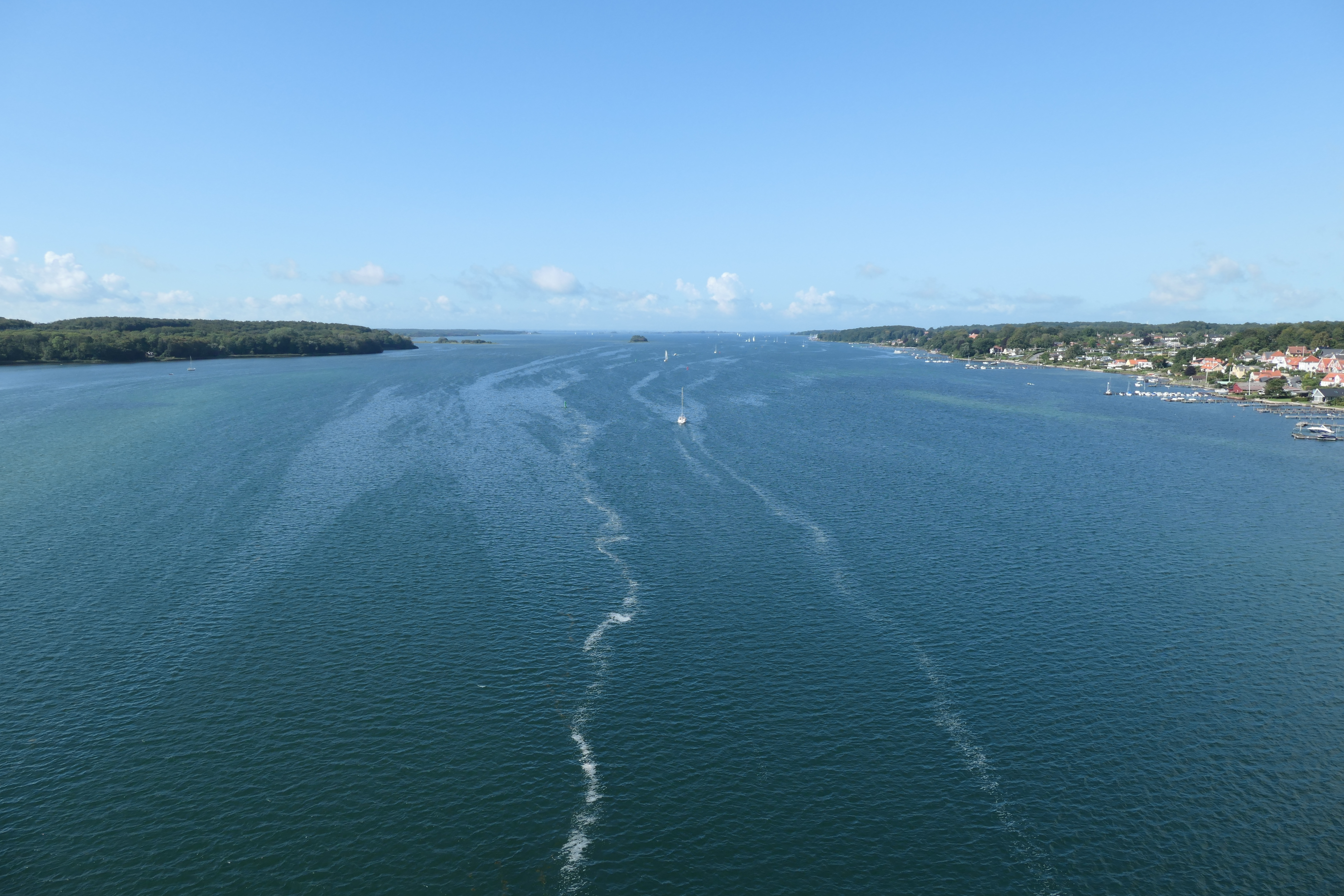
- Svendborgsund in 2023-

- Location within Denmark
- Coordinates: 55°2′27″N 10°36′30″E
- Type: strait
- Basin countries: Denmark

Svendborgsund is a strait that separates Funen from Tåsinge. In the west it flows into the South Funen Archipelago by the island Skarø, and in the east it ends in Thurø Sund and Skårupøre Sund, almost separated by Thurøbro, which is mostly a dam.

== See also ==
- Geography of Denmark
- Dolphin self-talk: unusual acoustic behaviour of a solitary bottlenose dolphin
