= Svendborgsund Bridge =

Svendborgsund Bridge Svendborgsundbroen
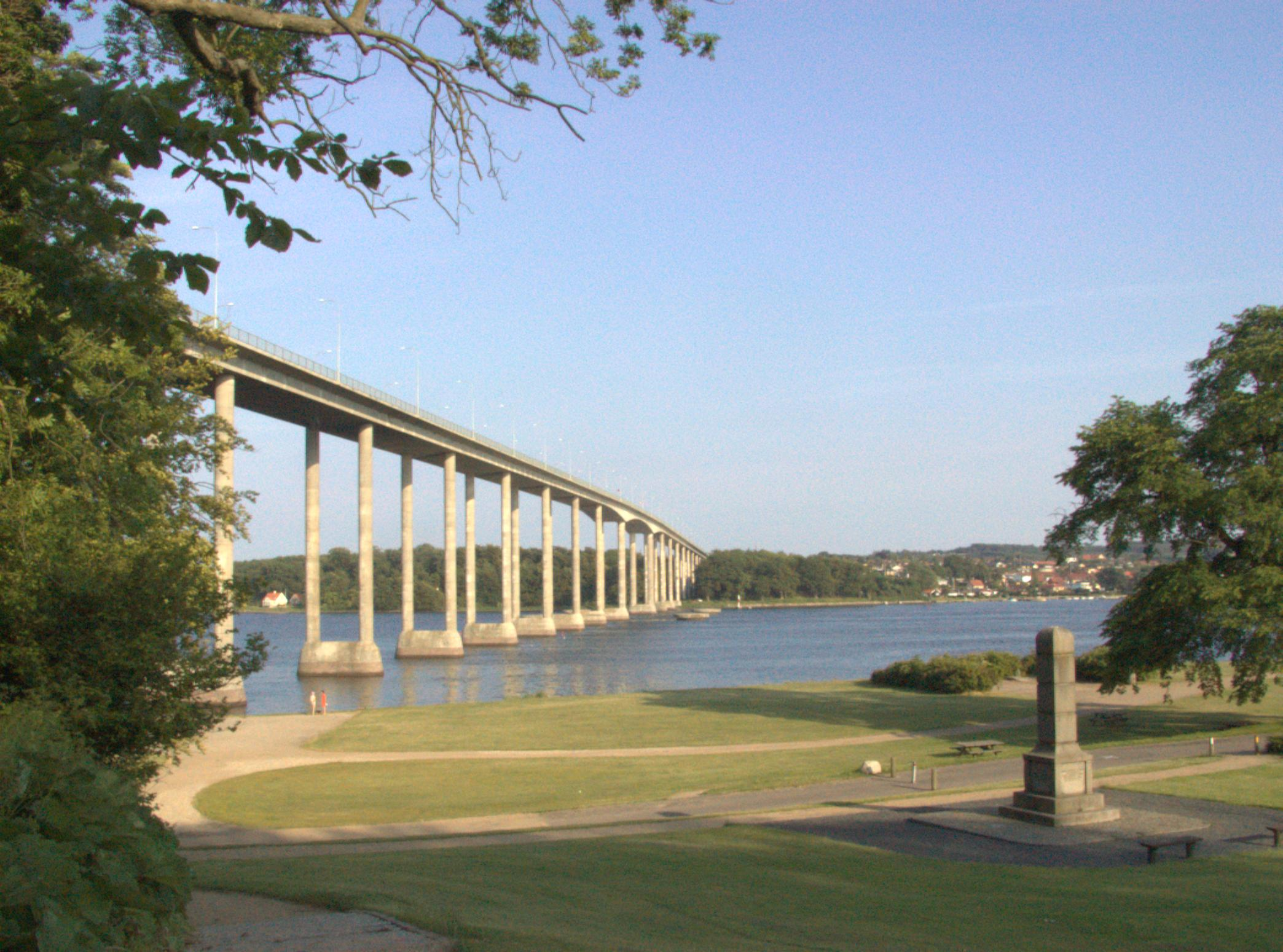
- The Svendborgsund Bridge, with the island Tåsinge in the background
- Coordinates: 55°02′51″N 10°36′09″E
- Carries: Pedestrians; Bicycles; Road traffic
- Crosses: Svendborgsund
- Locale: Svendborg Municipality

Characteristics
- Design: Beam bridge
- Total length: 1,216.0 m (3,989.5 ft)
- Width: 14.1 m (46 ft)
- Longest span: 90.0 m (295.3 ft)
- Clearance below: 33.0 m (108.3 ft)
- No. of lanes: 2

History
- Construction start: 1963
- Construction end: 1966
- Inaugurated: November 18, 1966

Location
- Interactive map of Svendborgsund Bridge

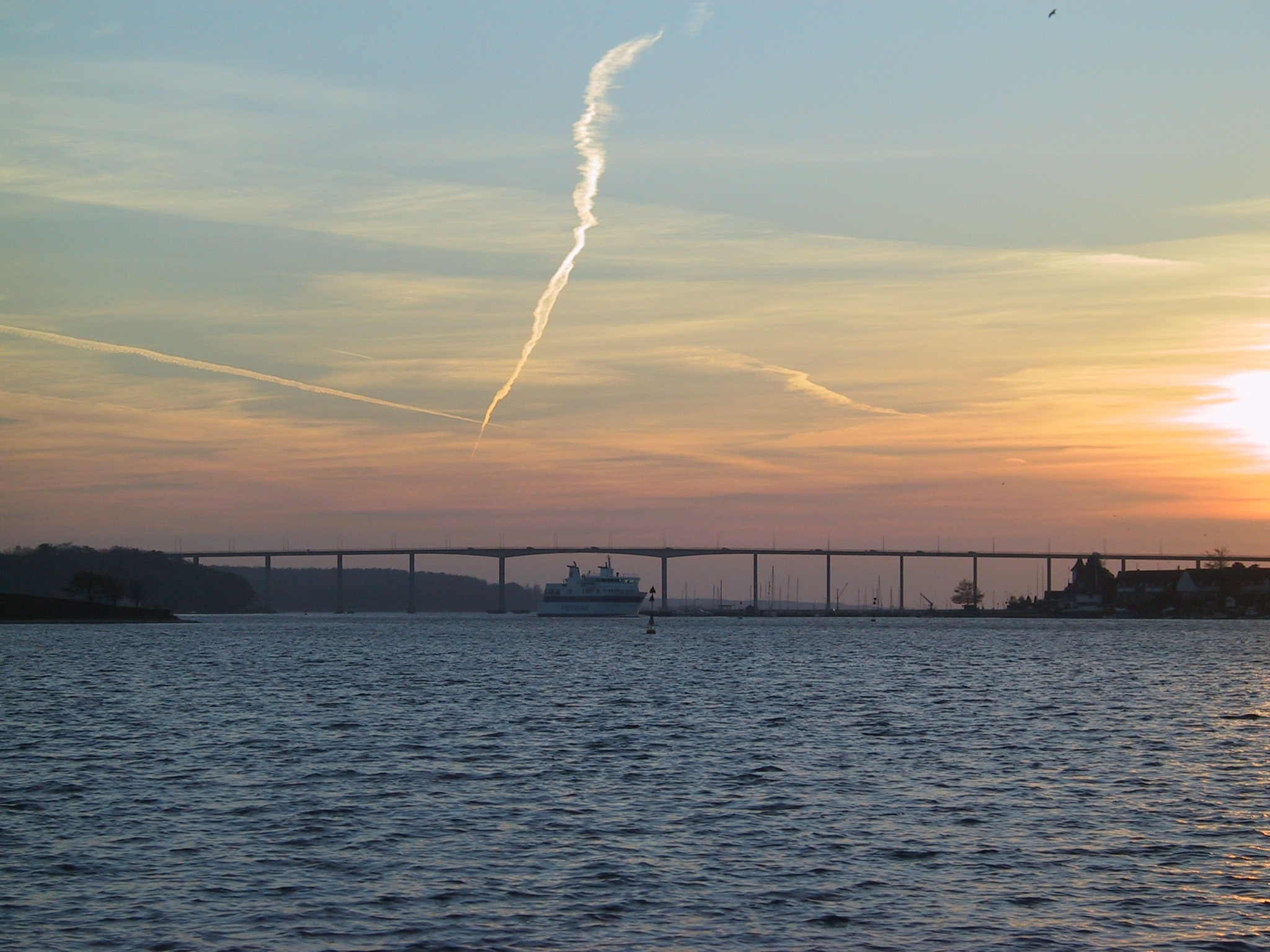
The Svendborg Sound Bridge in evening lighting as seen from Christiansminde. Vindeby is to the left, Svendborg to the right.

The Svendborg Sound Bridge (Svendborgsundbroen) is a bridge that crosses Svendborg Sound between the town of Svendborg on Fyn and Vindeby on the island of Tåsinge in Denmark. It is on the road to the island of Langeland. The bridge is 1220 metres long, the longest span is 90 metres, and the maximum clearance to the sea is 33 metres.

Svendborg Sound Bridge was opened by Princess Margrethe on 18 November 1966. The bridge cost 25 million kroner.

== See also ==
- List of bridges in Denmark
- List of bridges
