= Troense =

- Town
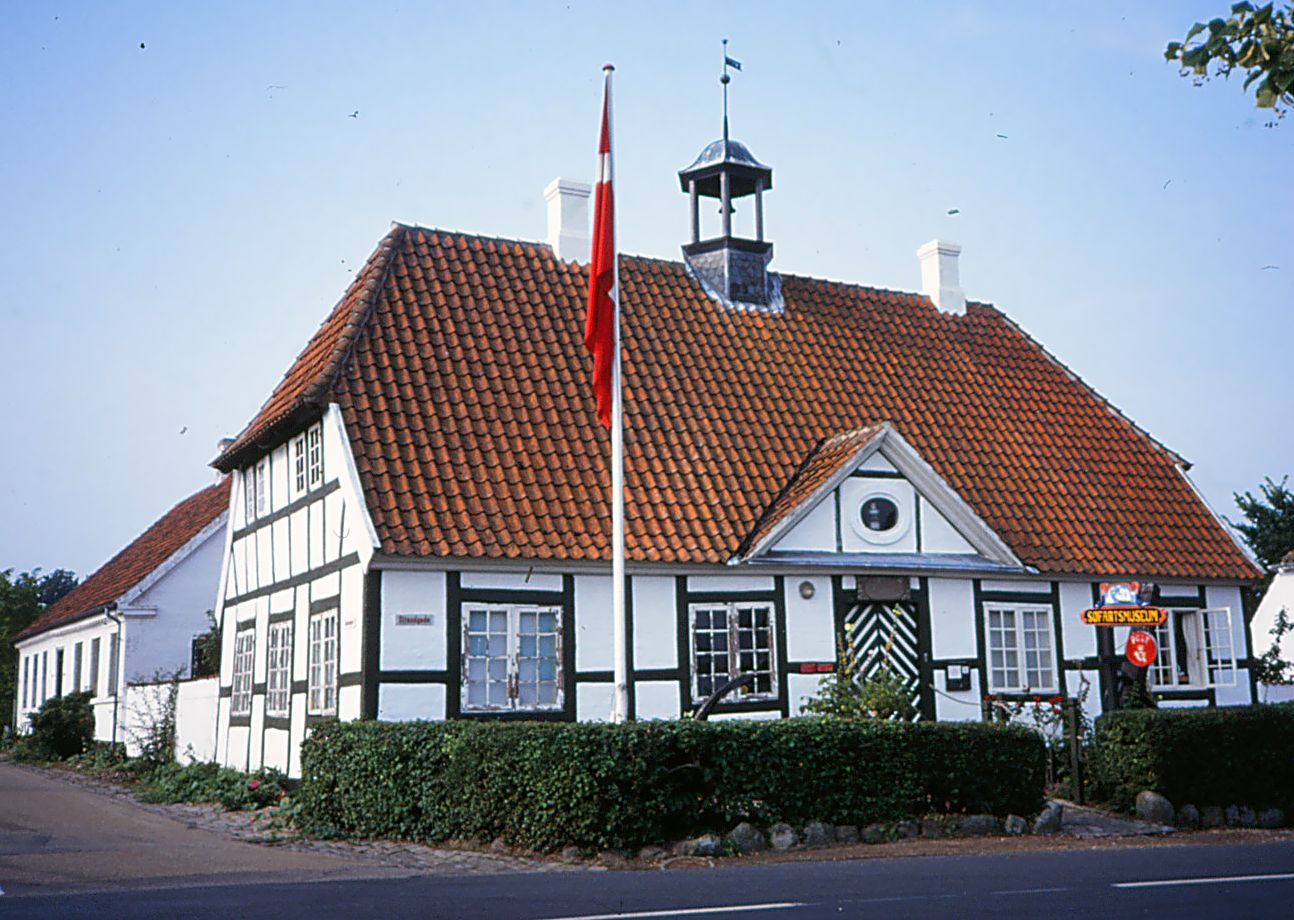

- Location in the Region of Southern Denmark
- Coordinates: 55°2′5″N 10°38′30″E
- Country: Denmark
- Region: Southern Denmark
- Municipality: Svendborg

Area
  - Urban: 0.9 km^{2} (0.35 sq mi)

Population (2026)
  - Urban: 1,442
  - Urban density: 1,600/km^{2} (4,100/sq mi)
- Time zone: UTC+1 (CET)
  - Summer (DST): UTC+2 (CEST)

Troense is a town on the island of Tåsinge in south-central Denmark, in Svendborg Municipality.

== Notable people ==
- Elvira Madigan (1867 – July 19, 1889 in Nørreskov) & Sixten Sparre lived for a few days in a guest house in Troense before meeting their deaths in the forest area of Nørreskov
