= Skarø =

Island in Denmark

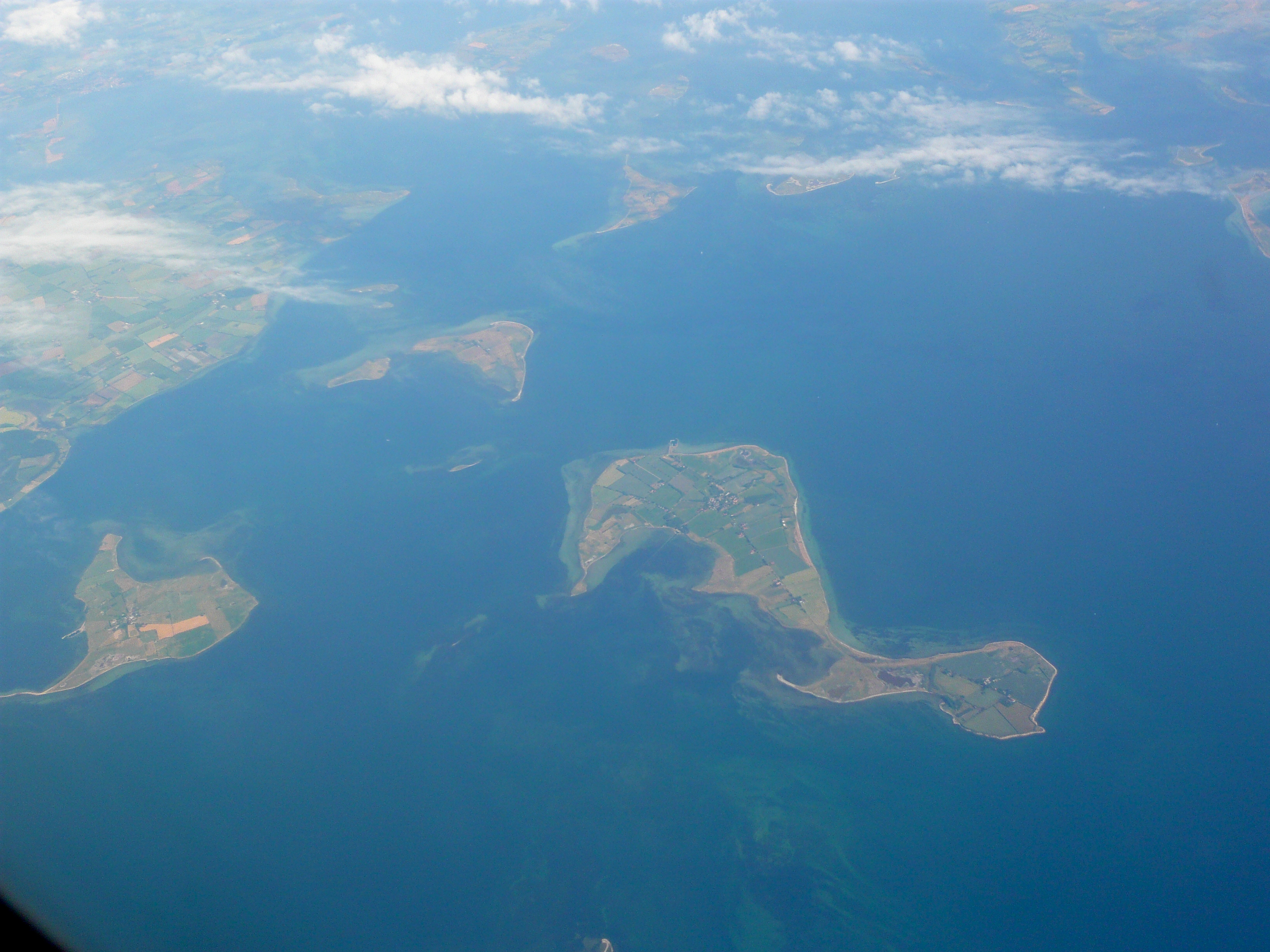
- Aerial view of the South Funen Archipelago, with Skarø on the lower left and Drejø on the right
- Interactive map of Skarø

Geography
- Coordinates: 55°0′15″N 10°28′2″E
- Area: 1.97 km^{2} (0.76 sq mi)

Administration
- Denmark
- Region: Southern Denmark
- Municipality: Svendborg Municipality

Demographics
- Population: 26 (2024)

Skarø (Danish pronunciation: [ˈskɑːˌʁœˀ]) is a Danish island south of Funen. The island covers an area of 1.97 square kilometres (0.76 square miles) and has 26 inhabitants. It is one of the smallest islands in the South Funen Archipelago.

Skarø was historically located within the Parish of Drejø. Today it is part of Svendborg Municipality within the Region of Southern Denmark. The island can be reached by ferry from Svendborg and Drejø. It is a popular tourist destination and its largest business, Skarø Is, sells ice cream globally.

== History ==
The first known reference to the island in historical records was made during the 13th century in Valdemar II's Danish Census Book. Although there is evidence of human presence on the island from the Stone Age, the book describes it as uninhabited and wild at the time. Initially spelled Skaarø, the island's name likely originates from the word skar, meaning edge, referring to the jagged shapes of the island's coast.

In 1555, the island was made part of Drejø Parish (Danish: Drejø Sogn) along with Hjortø and Birkholm. In 1570, there were just six farms on Skarø.

In 1893, residents of the island put forth a proposal to the Ministry of Culture requesting a funding for the construction of a church and cemetery. At that point in time, they had to sail to Drejø to attend church services. The ministry initially approved the request in 1894, but it was not until 1898 that construction began following designs by architect Niels Jacobsen. Skarø church was completed in the spring of 1900. It lies on the southwestern part of the island, less than a kilometer from the village, from which it has uninterrupted views of the sea on three sides. As its pastor does not live on the island, church services are held only once a month.

In 1908, a harbor was constructed on the island and regular ferry service began shortly thereafter. The island reached is greatest population at the turn of the 20th century, before declining. The population is now considered to be stable.

In 1944, during the German occupation of Denmark, a British Royal Air Force plane crash landed on Skarø while on route to Berlin. Because the island is relatively remote, the residents were able to hide the eight survivors from occupying forces. The two fatalities of the crash were buried by the Wehrmacht at the island's cemetery. After the war, residents of the island funded and dedicated a memorial to the two airmen who had died in the crash.

== Geography ==
Map of the southern part of Svendborg County in Denmark showing Skarø island

The landscape of the island was formed by the last ice age and is the result of a glacial moraine. Around 6000 BCE, the level of the Littorina Sea rose, separating the land from Drejø and Tåsinge and turning Skarø into an independent island. Today, the majority of the island's landscape is flat and consists of nutrient-rich clay soil which creates ideal agricultural conditions.

There are smaller salt marshes and headlands, particularly on the western coast which is lined with low cliffs. The islands most distinctive geographic feature, Skarø Odde, is a narrow headland that extends 900 meters to form the northern tip of the island. Skarø Odde has been part of the South Funen Wildlife Reserve since 1996, as it is an important breeding ground for migratory birds.

The highest point on the island, "Vesterbjerg", lies approximately 9 meters above sea level and is composed of glacial meltwater sand. The island's village is located near its geographic center, from which agricultural plots radiate outwards. It is approximately 3 meters AMSL. Because of the island's low elevation, it is vulnerable to storm surges and flooding. It has been particularly devastated in the past by the 1872 Baltic Sea flood and Storm Babet.

== Tourism ==
Skarø is a popular tourist destination and many of its businesses are seasonal to accommodate summer visitors. The largest company on the island, Skarø Is, is known for supplying ice cream to Singapore Airlines since 2011.

The SkarøFestival is held annually during the first weekend of August, and presents a line up of music performances. It has drawn from 1000 to 1500 visitors to the island since 1994.
