= Rantzausminde =

- Town
- Location in the Region of Southern Denmark
- Coordinates: 55°2′06″N 10°32′18″E
- Country: Denmark
- Region: Southern Denmark
- Municipality: Svendborg

Area
  - Urban: 1.3 km^{2} (0.50 sq mi)

Population (2026)
  - Urban: 2,227
  - Urban density: 1,700/km^{2} (4,400/sq mi)
- Time zone: UTC+1 (CET)
  - Summer (DST): UTC+2 (CEST)

Rantzausminde is a town located on the island of Funen in south-central Denmark, in Svendborg Municipality.
