= Valdemar's Castle =

Castle located on Tåsinge

Coordinates: 55°01′21″N 10°39′11″E

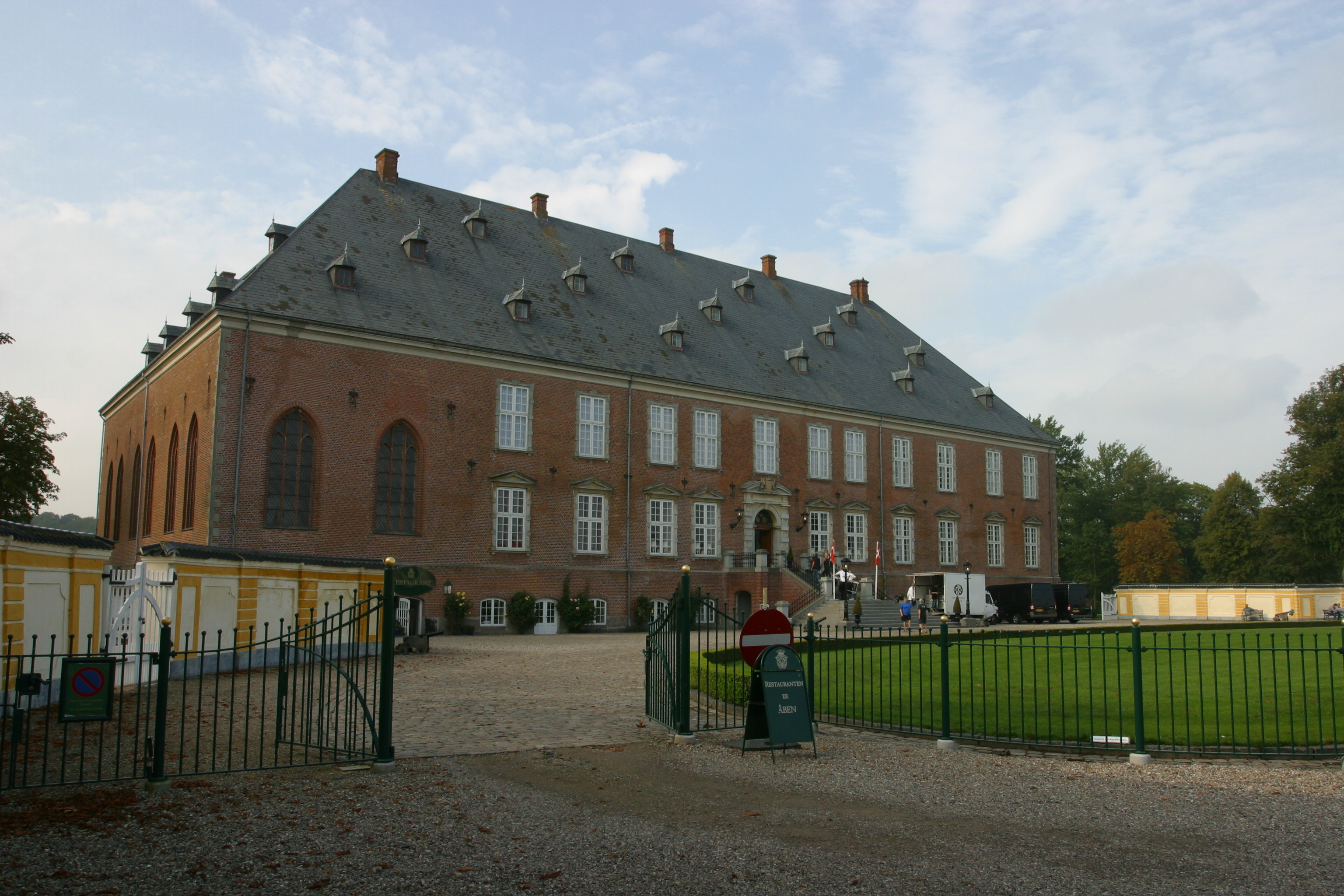
Valdemars Castle, Tåsinge

Valdemar's Castle (Danish: Valdemars Slot) is a manor house situated on the island of Tåsinge near Svendborg in southern Denmark. Louise Eleonora Kathleen Iuel-Brockdorff Albinus (born Baroness) has been the owner of Valdemar's castle since 2022.

== History ==
Valdemar's Castle was commissioned by King Christian IV (1588–1648) and built between 1639 and 1644 under the plans designed by architect Hans van Steenwinckel d.y. (1587–1639). It was not a fortification, but rather a large manor house. King Christian was well known for his interest in building. Tåsinge, the island where Christian planned to have Valdermar's Slot built, belonged to his mother in law Ellen Marsvin. He intended the new mansion should become the home of his son Valdemar Christian (1622–1656) whose mother was Kirstine Munk. Valdemar Christian never occupied the manor but was killed during a battle in Poland in 1656. In 1678, the naval hero, Admiral Niels Juel (1629–1697) was given title to the castle and the land on Tåsinge after his victory over Sweden in the Battle of Køge. The estate was transferred to him as payment for the Swedish ships captured in the battle.

== Previous ownership ==
The previous owner, Lensbaron Niels Krabbe Iuel-Brockdorff, who is 10th generation of the Juel family, took over his childhood home from his father in 1971 and lived in the castle with his wife and family until his death on 20 January 2017. Valdemar's Slot has been open to the public since 1974. The mansion is open from May to October and on public holidays. It features a large chapel, a toy museum, the Iuel-Brockdorff family's big game trophy collection and a local maritime museum. As it stands close by the shore, many visitors make the trip from Svendborg using the veteran ferry Helge.

== Gallery ==
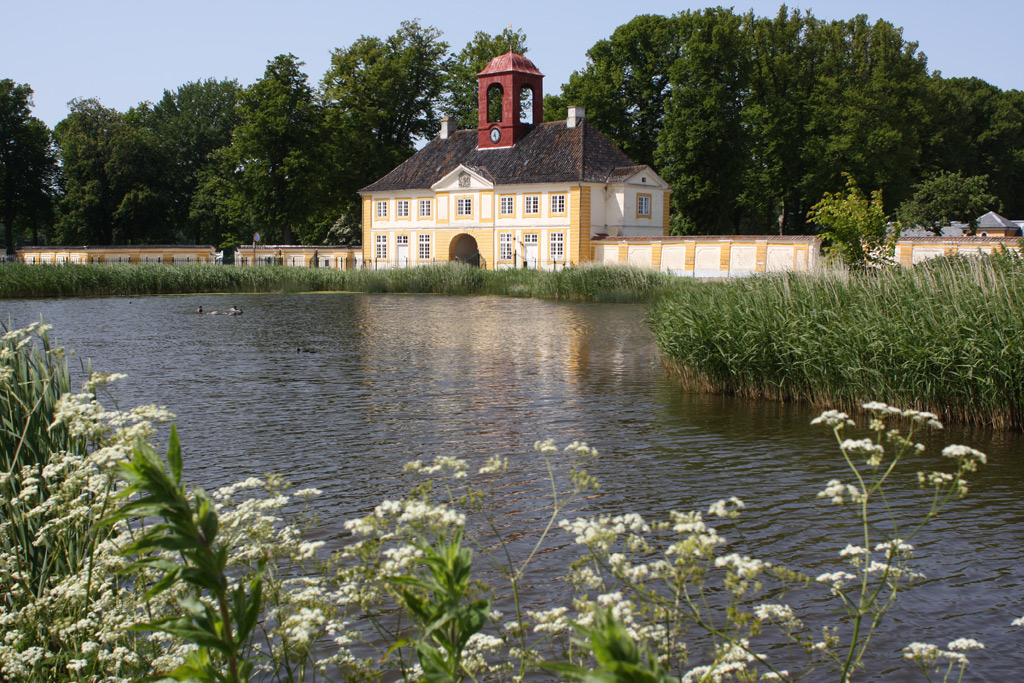
Gate

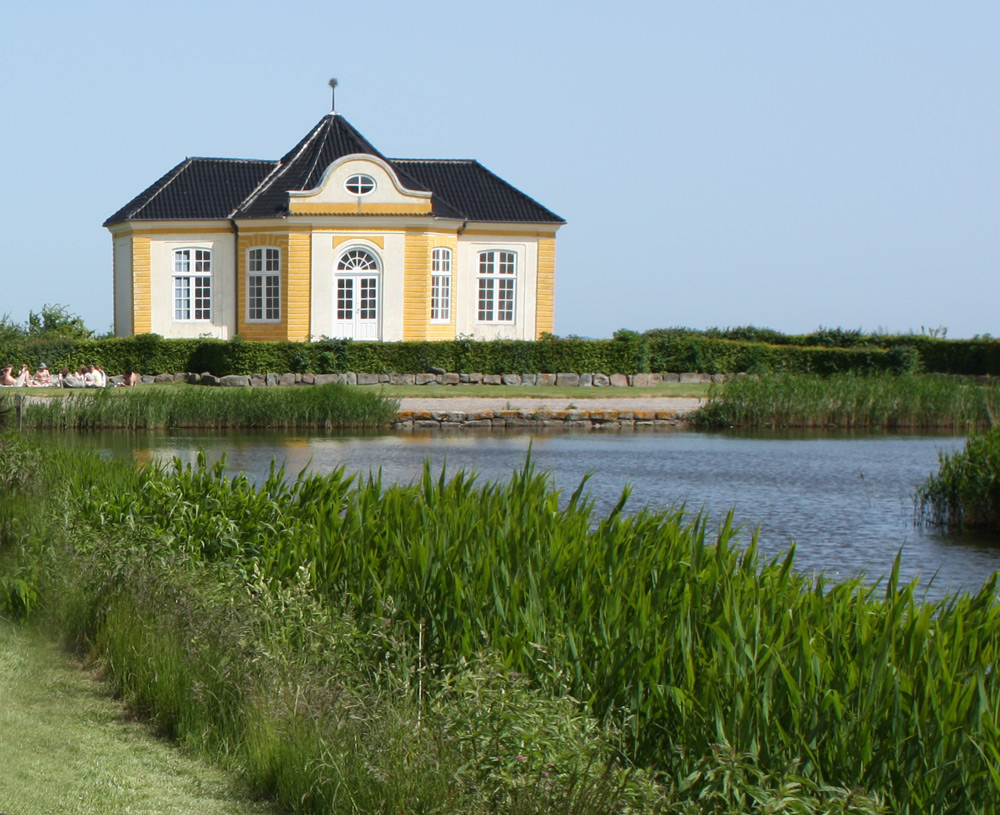
Tea pavilion

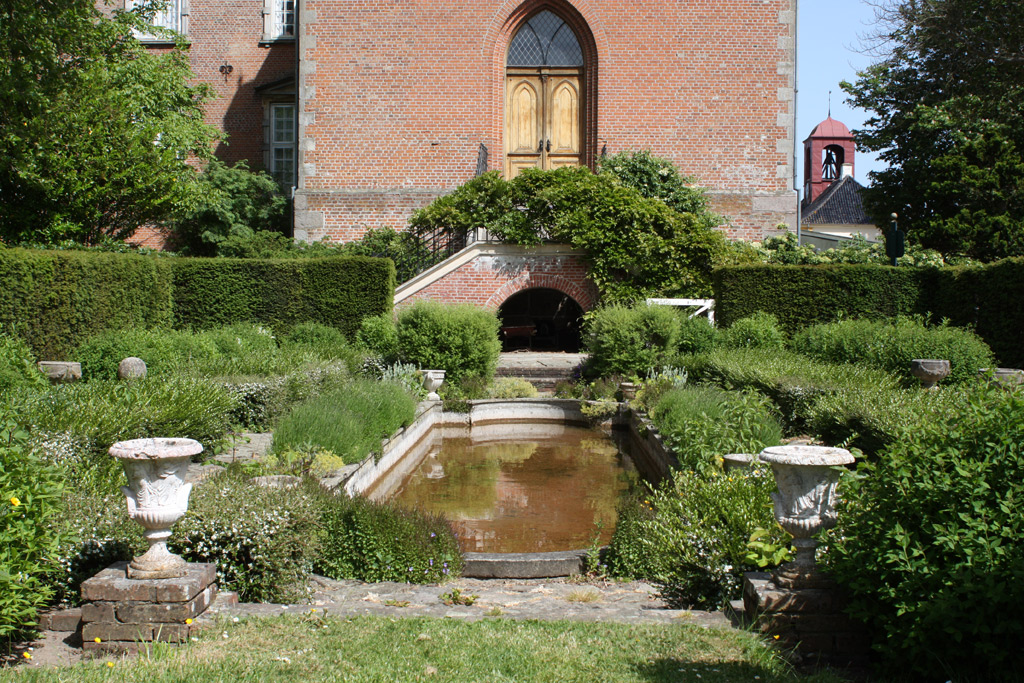
Garden behind church

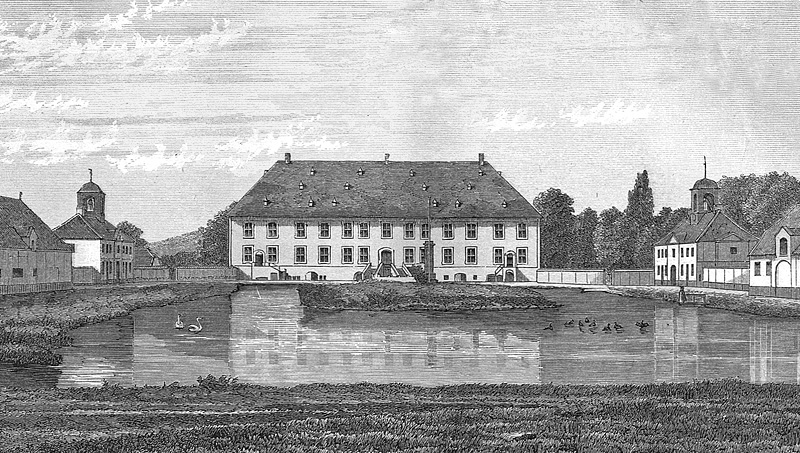
Drawing from 1872

== Panoramas ==
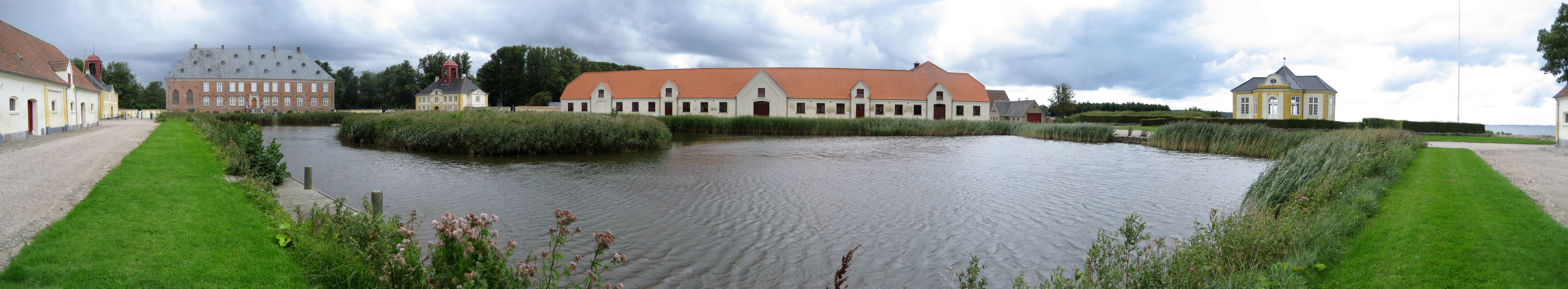
Valdemar's Castle

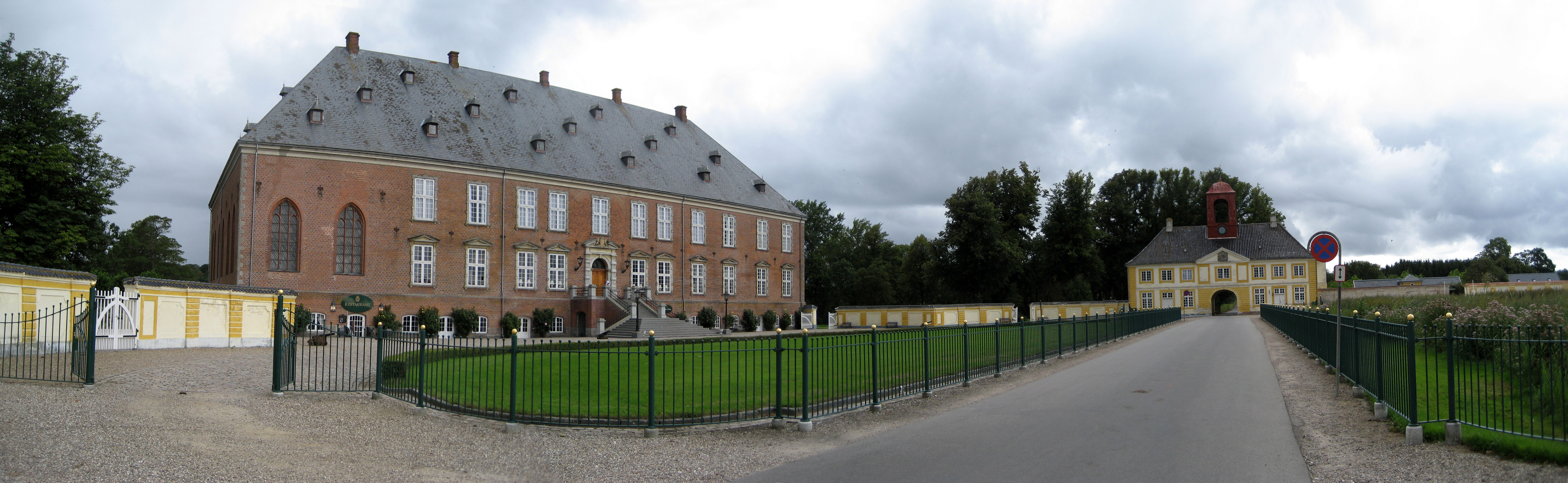
Castle and gate

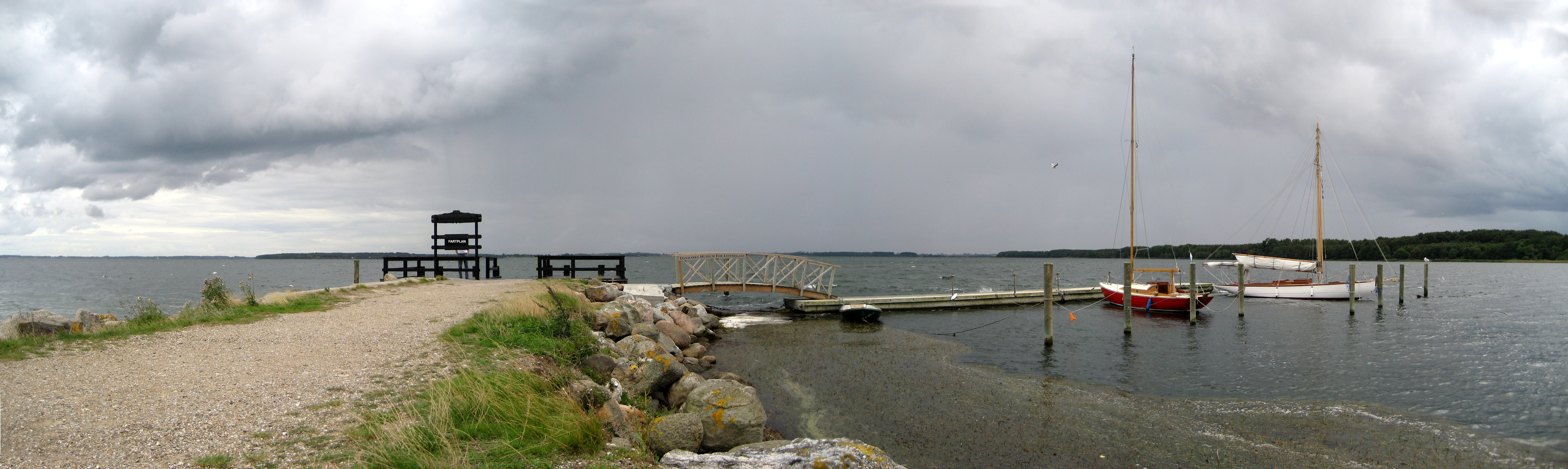
Ferry dock

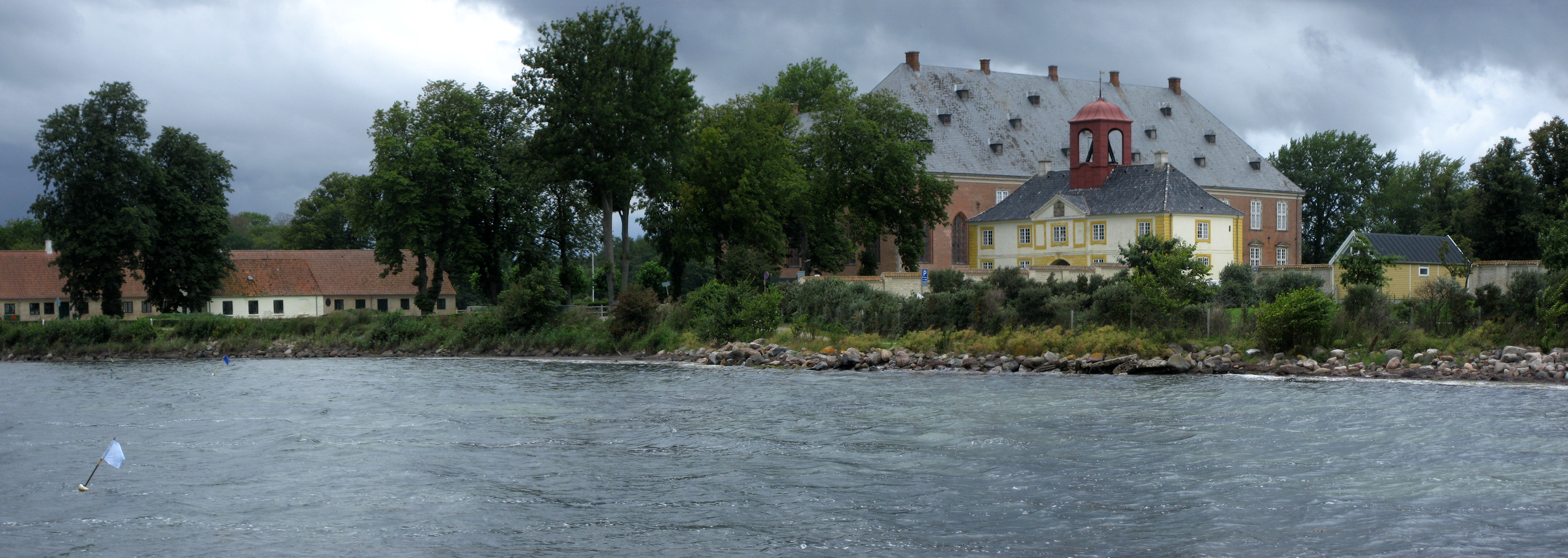
View from pier
