= Thurø By =

- Town
- Location in the Region of Southern Denmark
- Coordinates: 55°2′55″N 10°39′50″E
- Country: Denmark
- Region: Southern Denmark
- Municipality: Svendborg

Area
  - Urban: 1.8 km^{2} (0.69 sq mi)

Population (2026)
  - Urban: 3,414
  - Urban density: 1,900/km^{2} (4,900/sq mi)
- Time zone: UTC+1 (CET)
  - Summer (DST): UTC+2 (CEST)

Thurø By is the only town located on the island of Thurø of the South Funen Archipelago, in Svendborg Municipality of south-central Denmark.
