= Bregninge, Svendborg =

Bregninge
- Village
- Location in the Region of Southern Denmark
- Coordinates: 55°1′20″N 10°36′27″E
- Country: Denmark
- Region: Southern Denmark
- Municipality: Svendborg

Population (2026)
  - Total: 200
- Time zone: UTC+1 (CET)
  - Summer (DST): UTC+2 (CEST)

Bregninge is a village on the island of Tåsinge in south-central Denmark, in Svendborg Municipality.
