= Sixten Sparre =

Swedish nobleman and cavalry officer

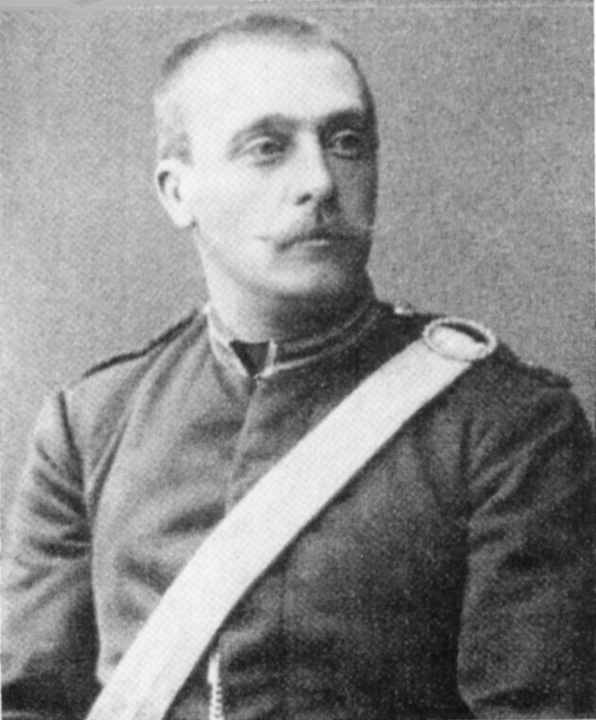
- Born: 27 September 1854; Malmö, Sweden
- Died: 19 July 1889 (aged 34); Tåsinge, Denmark
- Spouse: Luitgard Adelcreutz (m. 1880)
- Partner: Elvira Madigan

Bengt Edvard Sixten "Sigge" Sparre af Rossvik (27 September 1854 – 19 July 1889) was a Swedish nobleman, lieutenant, cavalry officer, journalist, poet, mostly known for the murder of circus performer Elvira Madigan in a murder-suicide. Their story has been subject to several theatrical and cinematic productions, such as that Elvira Madigan of Bo Widerberg in 1967 (played by Thommy Berggren) and a Danish film (Søren Svejstrup).

== Early life ==
Sparre af Rossvik was born on 27 September 1854 in Malmö, Sweden, the son of Sigge Rossvik and Adelaide Peijron.

== Personal life ==
In 1880, he married Countess Luitgard "Lycka" Adlercreutz.

Sparre and Madigan were both buried at Tåsinge graveyard.
