= Søren Svejstrup =

Danish diver

Personal information
- Nationality: Danish
- Born: 5 December 1937 (age 87); Copenhagen, Denmark

Sport
- Sport: Diving

Søren Svejstrup (born 5 December 1937) is a Danish diver. He competed in the men's 10 metre platform event at the 1964 Summer Olympics. He played Sixten Sparre in 1967 Danish film Elvira Madigan.
