= Johan Lindström Saxon =

Swedish publisher and vegetarianism activist

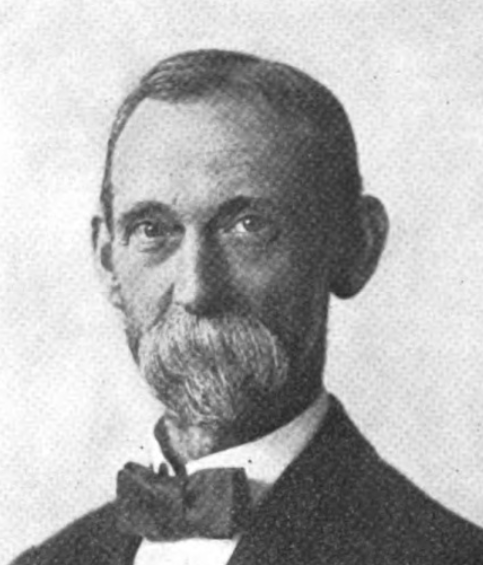
- Born: February 17, 1859; Gällersta
- Died: November 7, 1935 (aged 76)
- Occupations: Journalist, publisher

Johan Lindström Saxon (February 17, 1859 – November 7, 1935) was a Swedish journalist, publisher and vegetarianism activist.

== Biography ==
Saxon was born in Gällersta Parish, Örebro, to Lars Johan Lindström and Kristina Lovisa Olsdotter. He was educated at Örebro county high school and in 1880 started working for the newspaper Nerikes Allehanda in Örebro. He edited the newspapers, Arboga-posten (1881), Nya Arboga Tidning (1881–1884), Jämtlandsposten (1885–1856) and Norrlänningen (1887–1890). He was editorial secretary for Arbetet in Malmö (1890–1891) and editor of Jämtlands Tidning (1891–1904). In 1904, he established the magazine Såningsmannen in Stockholm.

He married twice. He married Hedvig Lundcrantz in 1886 and Anna Maria Bergström in 1895. In 1928, he established the publishing house Saxon & Lindströms which he operated with his brothers David and Edvin Lindström. Saxon was referred to as "Sweden's skinniest man" and has been described by historians as one of Sweden's most successful publishers. He was a member of the Royal Gustavus Adolphus Academy and the Swedish Peace and Arbitration Association.

Saxon met Peter Kropotkin in 1890 and dedicated an entire chapter to him in his memoirs. Kropotkin inspired Saxon's idea of "alternative agriculture", to breed out cattle and live off the produce of the earth. Saxon took interest in health research. He advocated fresh air, physical exercise and a lacto-ovo vegetarian diet. Saxon's most successful book Umgängeskonst: Levnadskonst published in 1934 went through eight editions and sold over 70,000 copies. He was an advocate of animal welfare and radical individualism.

Saxon was the author of Sorgeliga saker hända which inspired the 1967 film Elvira Madigan.

== Temperance advocacy ==
Saxon was an advocate of temperance reform. He wrote many articles and books combating alcoholism. It is estimated that he delivered 1,000 speeches on total abstinence. His temperance book I Blatt Band published in 1907 was widely read in Sweden.

== Vegetarianism ==
Saxon was a vegetarian and formed the Svenska Vegetariska Föreningen (Swedish Vegetarian Society) in 1903. He was editor of its magazine Vegetarianen. Saxon also assisted in founding the Norwegian Vegetarian Society. He was congress president of the International Vegetarian Union (1920–1923).
