= Vindeby, Svendborg Municipality =

Vindeby
- Town
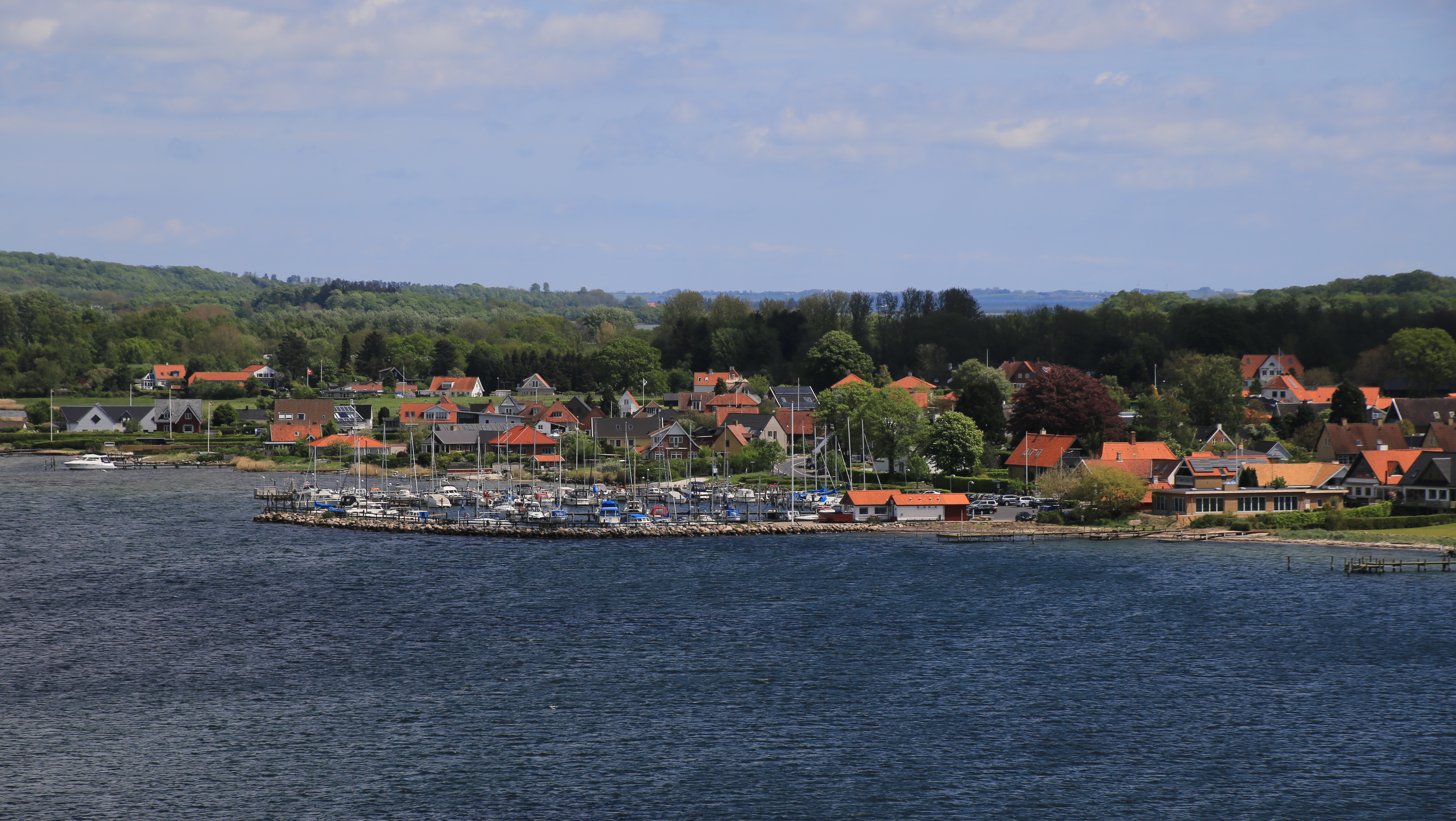

- Location in the Region of Southern Denmark
- Coordinates: 55°3′40″N 10°36′46″E
- Country: Denmark
- Region: Southern Denmark
- Municipality: Svendborg

Area
  - Urban: 1.3 km^{2} (0.50 sq mi)

Population (2026)
  - Urban: 2,355
  - Urban density: 1,800/km^{2} (4,700/sq mi)
- Time zone: UTC+1 (CET)
  - Summer (DST): UTC+2 (CEST)

Vindeby is a town on the island of Tåsinge in south-central Denmark, in Svendborg Municipality. It lies on the north coast of Tåsinge, across from Svendborg on the Funen side, to which it is connected by the Svendborgsund Bridge.
