= Drejø =

Drejø Island
- Island
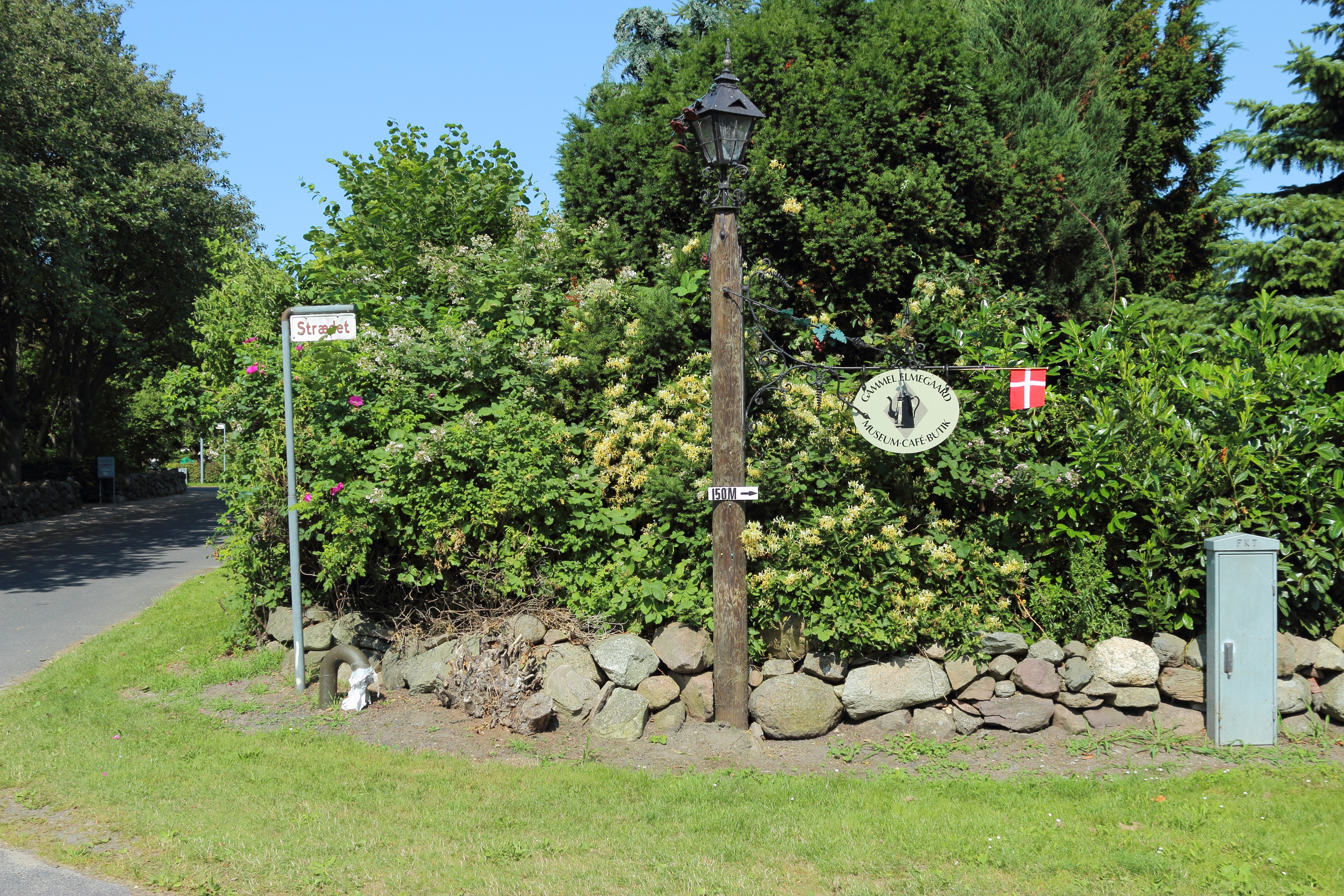
- Road crossing in Drejø By

- Drejø is north of Ærø (bottom left)
- Coordinates: 54°58′0″N 10°25′0″E
- Country: Denmark
- Municipality: Svendborg municipality

Area
  - Total: 4.26 km^{2} (1.64 sq mi)

Population (2024)
  - Total: 65
  - Density: 15/km^{2} (40/sq mi)
- Time zone: UTC+1 (CET)
  - Summer (DST): UTC+2 (CEST)

Drejø (Danish pronunciation: [ˈtʁɑjˌøˀ]) is a Danish island south of Funen with 65 inhabitants, located in Svendborg municipality. The island covers an area of 4.26 km^{2} (1.64 sq mi) , and is 5 km (3 mi) long and 2 km (1 mi) wide at its widest. A ferry travels between Svendborg, Skarø and Drejø.

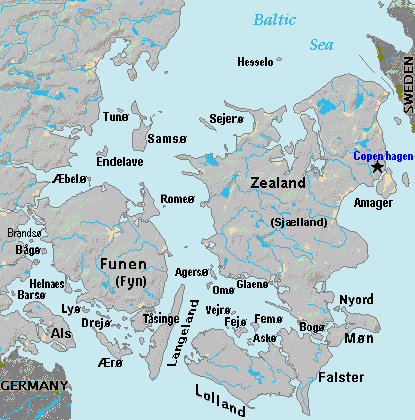
Drejø island (lower left) is north of Ærø, south of Funen Island & southeast of Lyø.
