= Tåsinge =

Danish island

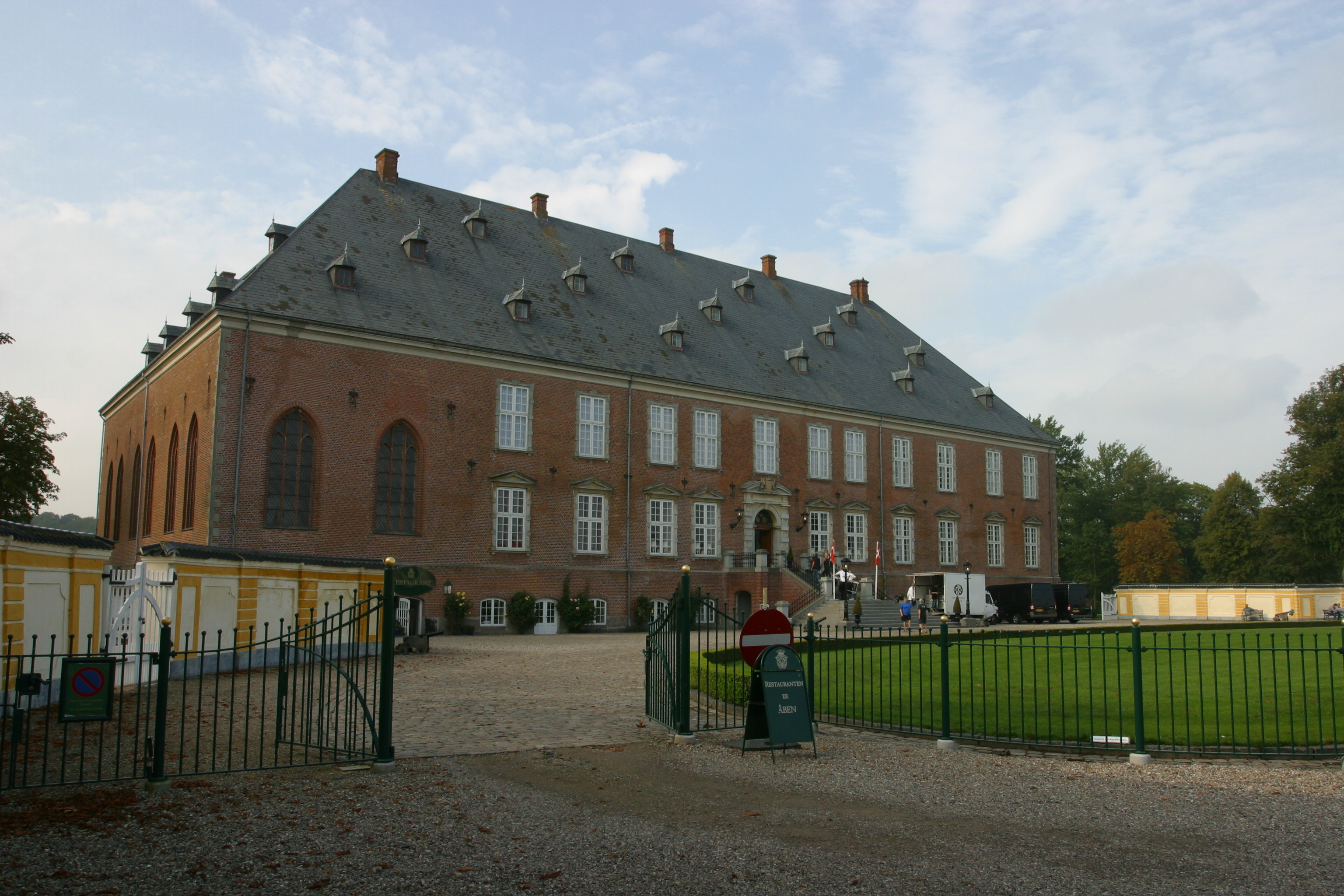
- Valdemars Castle, the largest estate on the island

Geography
- Location: Baltic Sea
- Coordinates: 55°00′N 10°36′E
- Area: 70 km^{2} (27 sq mi)

Administration
- Denmark
- Region: South Denmark Region
- Municipality: Svendborg Municipality
- Largest settlement: Vindeby (pop. 2,355)

Demographics
- Population: 6,187 (2010)
- Pop. density: 88.4/km^{2} (229/sq mi)

Tåsinge (Danish: [ˈtsʰɔːˌse̝ŋə]) is a Danish island immediately south of Funen, opposite and facing Svendborg, divided from Funen by Svendborgsund. The island covers an area of circa 70 km^{2} (27 sq mi). It is part of the South Funen Archipelago and has 6,111 inhabitants. The Danish national road 9 crosses the island.

Until the municipality reform of 1970, the island retained its own municipality (sognekommune). Since 1970, it has been part of Svendborg Municipality.

Before the 1960s, when the island became connected to Funen via the Svendborgsund Bridge and to Langeland via the Langeland Bridge, it was served by ferries from Svendborg to Vindeby and from Vemmenæs to Rudkøbing respectively.

Until 2011 the public schools on the island consisted of two separate entities, Lundby Skole and Sundhøjskolen, but in 2011 they were merged into a single structure called Tåsingeskolen with close to 800 pupils, by far the largest school in the entire municipality.

The inhabitants of the island refer to themselves as Tøsinger. The local dialect called tåsingsk is still in use on the island, though not as common as in the past.

== Etymology ==
The meaning of the island's name (Tåsinge) has been a matter of debate throughout the past couple of hundred years. The Knýtlinga saga mentions as a place name "þórslundr" ('Thor's Grove') in its description of Denmark (chap. 32) and though it might refer to the island of Tåsinge, it could also well be referring to another place near Odense The first time Tåsinge clearly appears in the sources is in the Danish Census Book from around 1231, where it is called Thosland, and this designation seems to have been in proper use for a very long time, until the Age of Enlightenment, when antiquarians of the day because of the rudimentary state of etymology reinterpreted the name as 'Thorseng' or 'Thorsing', believing the name to mean 'Thors seng' or 'Thors eng' (lit. Thors bed/Thors meadow). This particular change in the island's name was seen in use for more than a century until gradually it changed into the now used form.

Etymologists presently consider the prefix to be a root of Old Norse 'Thōs', meaning 'melting', 'thawing' and alike, possibly referring to the narrow strait of Svendborgsund which separates the island from Funen. The suffix '-land' is likely referring to the island itself (ref. the village name of Landet, central on the island), often used in Danish place names to characterize 'larger islands' (e.g. neighbouring Langeland).

== Geography and settlements ==
Tåsinge is historically divided into three parishes, corresponding to the three main villages on the island, Bregninge, at the northern part of the island, Landet at the central and Bjerreby at the southern part. The largest settlements besides these are Vindeby, Troense, Lundby and Strammelse.

The north and northeasternmost part of the island, comprising Vindeby and Troense, has seen a large increase in demographics since the construction of the Svendborgsund Bridge and has virtually become a suburb of Svendborg, while the rest of the island in large parts has retained its rural and historical boundaries. In the north commuters who work in the Svendborg area and retired senior citizens live, while the rest of the island is mostly occupied by farming and agriculture.

Sydfyns Flyveplads (Tåsinge International Airport) (ICAO: EKST), the only major aerodrome in the vicinity, is situated on the western part of the island, providing trips for both business and recreational purposes.

== History and attractions ==
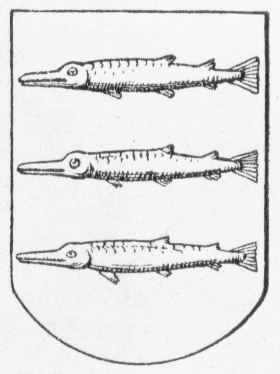
Coat of arms of Tåsinge, 1610, showing three garfish

Tåsinge has been a tourist destination for more than 100 years, the main attractions being the islands idyllic and surprisingly diverse nature as well as the many preserved historic buildings, often several hundreds of years old.

The island itself also had its fair share of historical events. For several decades in the 14th century, the island (along with the whole of Funen and large parts of modern Denmark in general) was pawned to Holstein nobles, but was reunited with Denmark under the Danish king Valdemar Atterdag. During the Dano-Swedish War (1658–60) the island was overrun by Swedish troops, plundering the villages and leaving a devastated population, and still later, during the Dano-Swedish War of 1808–09 the island was frequently used for both camp and as a transport hub for the French-Spanish reinforcements.

From the 17th century on, during the Age of absolutism, the first baron on Valdemars Castle (who had won the rights to the castle following the Battle of Køge Bay) and his inheritors soon amassed as much land on the island as possible, effectively making the ever-sitting baron the de facto owner and feudal lord of almost the entire island, with the farmers remaining as tenants and copyholders, from the first part of the 18th century and right until the conversion of entailed estates into fee simple (Lensafløsningen) 1919. Tåsinge also had its own birkeret, presided by the baron as supreme judicial court as well (also until 1919). The population (3,600 in 1823) was all peasantry or sailors.

A popular local anecdote, to put this in perspective, tells of the smith of Troense, who owned a small patch of land next to his house, and proudly announced that "Me and the Baron owns the entire island!"

The male line of the barons Juel were however not necessarily only harsh lords, but introduced several new occupations and innovations to the island through the years, such as the (later) important apple farming, attempts at industrial cloth production (a klædefabrik, 1752–58) and public schools (1795) among other things.

Today, Valdemars Slot and surrounding area are among the most well known tourist spots on the island.

The nearby village of Troense, situated slightly opposite Svendborg, picturesque with a view to Svendborgsund and neighboring Valdemars Slot, is particularly famed for its well-dimensioned and idyllic half timbered houses, build by wealthy sea captains and sailors through the golden period in the Age of Sails, when large sailing ships were being constructed on local shipyards and crewed for faraway destinations.

By the end of the 19th century, the Troense area was extremely popular among tourists (and still is), becoming easier to reach with modern transportation such as train and ferry, and with cheap accommodations and activities such as sea bathing, excursions, relaxation, social gatherings, etc. In the summer season, the visitors would typically book one of several private pensions, a large part of the village effectively becoming a resort town in the early decades of the 20th century. Among the more well known visitors were the composer Rued Langgaard and the writer Henri Nathansen.

Troense is also known as the last place where Elvira Madigan and Sixten Sparre stayed in July 1889, before going on a "picnic with Death" in the nearby Nørreskov forest. This tragic, infamous incident has become an integral part of the island's lore. Today it is a tourist magnet as the couple is resting side by side in the churchyard at nearby Landet Kirke. The precise location of their murder-suicide in the forest of Nørreskov is marked by a granite boulder.

About a kilometer west of Valdemars Castle, next to the road leading there, stands the so-called Ambrosius Oak, which is a 400-year-old giant oak with a circumference of around 7.5 meters. The name refers to the Danish rococo poet Ambrosius Stub (whose surname literally means '(tree) stub'), which was serving for more than a decade (1739–52) as a secretary and handyman to the baron of Valdemars Castle, and who is said to have often been sitting under the tree relaxing or writing.

The highest point on the island is Bregninge Bakke (Bregninge Hill), ca. 70 m.a.s.l. (about 229.5 ft.). Bregninge Kirke is situated on top of the hill, and from its tower, in clear weather, it is possible to see large parts of the South Funen Archipelago. It is said that one can observe 28 islands, 65 churches and 20 manors from here. There is public access to the church in the daytime and (for a modest and optional fee) to the observation deck in the tower. The surrounding 18,000 square metres (190,000 square feet) of the hill is designated as a protected habitat. In the porch of the church lies a romanesque headstone placed over a deacon inscribed with runes. Situated next to the church is Tåsinge Museum (Museum of Tåsinge), which serves as a local folk museum for the historic life of mainly the sailors of old time Tåsinge, but also houses in a separate building a large collection of music instruments, note sheets etc., pertaining to traditional folk music.

During the Napoleonic Wars a semaphore line tower, a branch of Storebæltstelegrafen, was placed further to the north on the hill.

== Tåsinge and American emigrants ==
From around 1850 until the first part of the 20th century, the prospects for many young people were to become tenants or copyholders on the island like their parents, without many possibilities of ascending in life. Accordingly, many emigrated to the United States. Søren Lolk, an enlightened farmer, educator, photographer and vitalist from Tåsinge visited some of the emigrated tøsinger in the United States over four months in 1903 and photographed and collected evidence from them, before returning.

The local archive of Landet keeps both Lolks collections and other evidence of the connections, and regularly receives requests from far and away relatives to once Tåsinge born residents.

== 1967 film about Elvira Madigan ==
Elvira Madigan and Sixten Sparre, whose tragic love affair has been portrayed in several works of art, were depicted in Bo Widerberg's 1967 film Elvira Madigan. However, none of the scenes in the film were shot on location on Tåsinge, but rather in Klampenborg and Scania.

== See also ==
- List of islands of Denmark
- Ærø, Drejø, Langeland, Lolland – other nearby islands.
