= Hjortø =

Island of Denmark

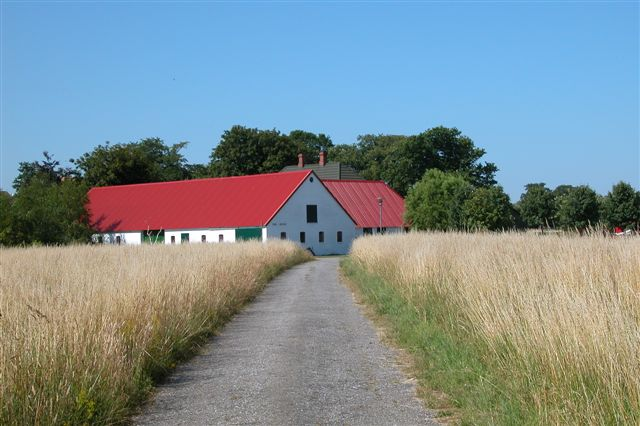
- Interactive map of Hjortø

Geography
- Coordinates: 54°57′50″N 10°29′5″E
- Area: .90 km^{2} (0.35 sq mi)

Administration
- Denmark
- Region: Southern Denmark
- Municipality: Svendborg

Demographics
- Population: 7 (2020)

Additional information
- Time zone: CET (UTC+1)
  - Summer (DST): CEST (UTC+2)

Hjortø is a Danish island south of Funen. The island covers an area of 0.9 km^{2} and has 7 inhabitants as of 2020. The island can be reached by ferry from Svendborg, maximum 12 passengers.

Ferry port
