= Svendborg Municipality =

Svendborg Municipality Svendborg Kommune (Danish)
- Municipality
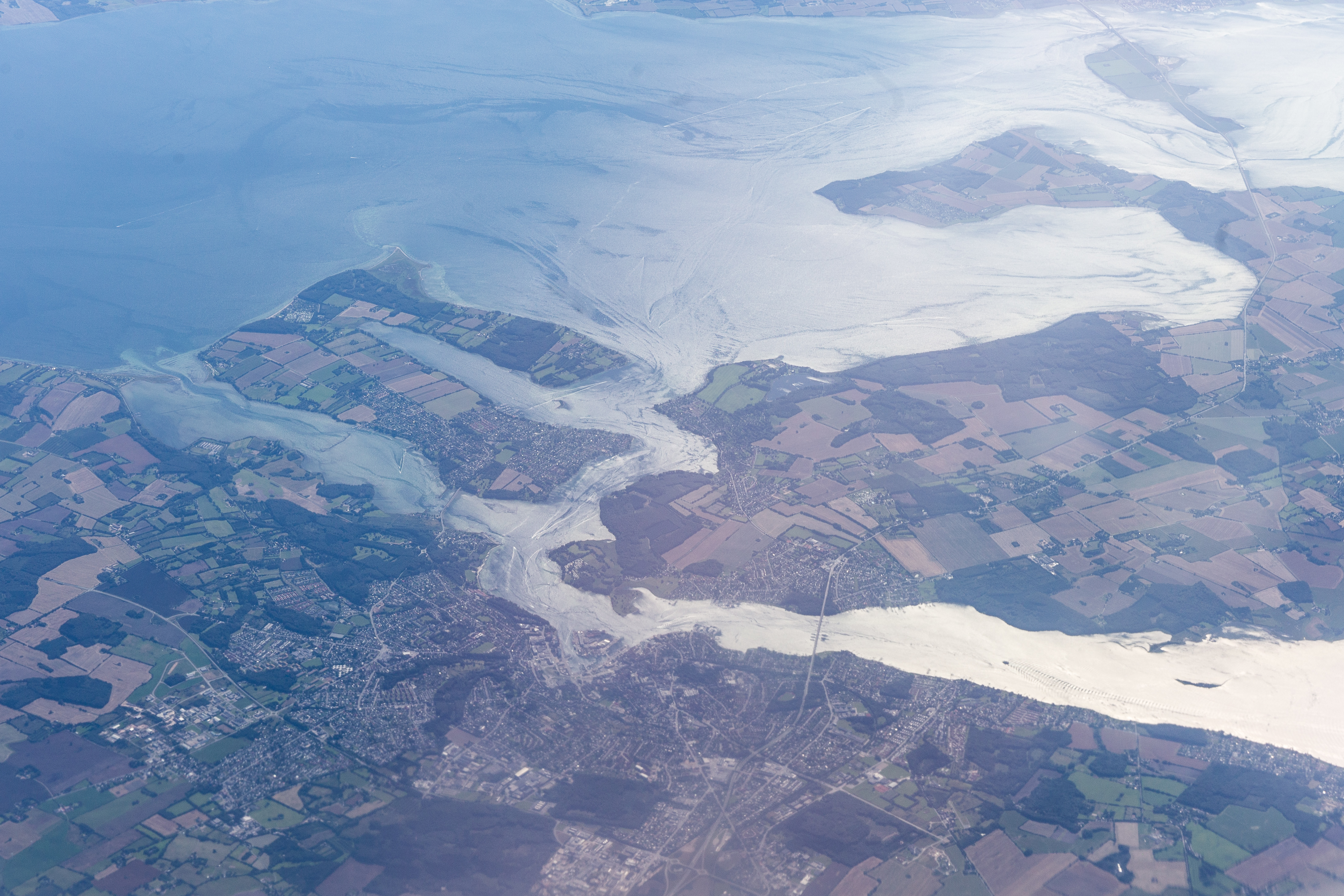

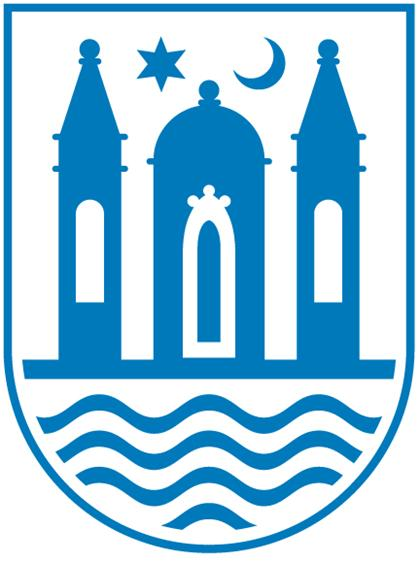
- Coat of arms

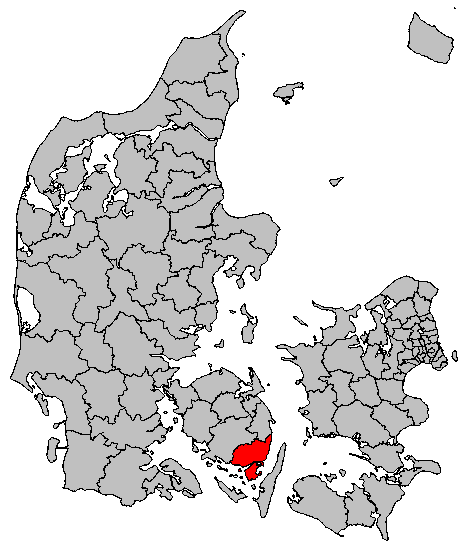
- Coordinates: 55°06′N 10°36′E
- Country: Denmark
- Region: Southern Denmark
- Seat: Svendborg

Government
  - Mayor: Bo Hansen (S)

Area
  - Total: 417.0 km^{2} (161.0 sq mi)

Population (1 January 2026)
  - Total: 60,027
  - Density: 143.9/km^{2} (372.8/sq mi)
- Time zone: UTC+1 (CET)
  - Summer (DST): UTC+2 (CEST)
- Postal code: 5700
- Municipal code: 479
- Website: www.svendborg.dk

Svendborg Municipality (Danish: Svendborg Kommune) is a kommune in the Region of Southern Denmark on the southeast coast of the island of Funen, as well as on the islands of Drejø, Hjortø, Skarø, Thurø, and Tåsinge off Funen's southeastern shores in south-central Denmark. The municipality covers an area of 418 km^{2}, and has a total population of 60,027 (2026). Its mayor is Bo Hansen (2025), a member of the Social Democrats political party. The main town and the site of its municipal council is the city of Svendborg.

South of the municipality separating that part located on Funen from the other islands is the Svendborg Strait (Svendborg Sund).

The 1,220-meter (4003-ft) long Svendborgsund Bridge (Svendborgsundbroen) connects the municipality at the city of Svendborg over the islands of Tåsinge and Siø, where the 774 meter (2540 ft) long Langeland Bridge (Langelandsbroen) continues to the city of Rudkøbing on the island of Langeland. The Svendborgsund Bridge was opened in 1966. The Langeland's Bridge was opened in 1962, and is Denmark's 10th longest bridge.

Ferry service connects the municipality at the town of Svendborg to the municipality's islands of Skarø, Drejø, and Hjortø, and to the town of Ærøskøbing on the island of Ærø.

On 1 January 2007 Svendborg municipality was, as the result of Kommunalreformen ("The Municipal Reform" of 2007), merged with Gudme and Egebjerg municipalities to form an enlarged Svendborg municipality.

== Politics ==
Svendborg's municipal council consists of 29 members, elected every four years. The municipal council has seven political committees.

=== Municipal council ===
Below are the municipal councils elected since the Municipal Reform of 2007.

Election	Party												Total seats	Turnout	Elected mayor
Election	A	B	C	F	I	L	L	O	T	V	Ø	Å	Total seats	Turnout	Elected mayor
2005	8	1	2	2		1		2	1	11	1		29	72.1%	Lars Erik Hornemann (V)
2009	9		2	4				2	1	10	1		29	70.3%	Curt Sørensen (A)
2013	6	1	3	1	1		1	5	1	6	4		29	76.2%	Lars Erik Hornemann (V)
2017	10	2	2	1				4		6	3	1	29	74.8%	Bo Hansen (A)
Data from Kmdvalg.dk 2005, 2009, 2013 and 2017

== Locations ==
The ten largest urban areas in the municipality are:

#	Locality	Population
1	Svendborg	27,009
2	Thurø By	3,383
3	Vindeby	2,321
4	Rantzausminde	1,887
5	Stenstrup	1,735
6	Skårup	1,698
7	Ollerup	1,359
8	Troense	1,159
9	Vester Skerninge	1,045
10	Gudme	935

== Climate ==
Climate data for Svendborg
Month	Jan	Feb	Mar	Apr	May	Jun	Jul	Aug	Sep	Oct	Nov	Dec	Year
Mean daily maximum °C (°F)	2 (35)	2 (36)	4 (40)	9 (48)	14 (58)	19 (67)	21 (69)	21 (69)	17 (62)	11 (52)	7 (44)	3 (37)	11 (51)
Mean daily minimum °C (°F)	−2 (28)	−2 (28)	−1 (31)	2 (36)	7 (44)	11 (51)	13 (55)	12 (54)	10 (50)	6 (43)	2 (36)	−1 (31)	5 (41)
Average precipitation mm (inches)	48 (1.9)	38 (1.5)	46 (1.8)	41 (1.6)	43 (1.7)	48 (1.9)	61 (2.4)	74 (2.9)	53 (2.1)	64 (2.5)	53 (2.1)	58 (2.3)	620 (24.6)
Source: Weatherbase
