= Denmark at the 2020 Summer Olympics =

- IOC code: DEN
- NOC: National Olympic Committee and Sports Confederation of Denmark
- Website: www.dif.dk (in Danish and English)

in Tokyo, Japan July 23, 2021 – August 8, 2021
- Competitors: 108 in 16 sports
- Flag bearers (opening): Sara Slott Petersen; Jonas Warrer
- Flag bearer (closing): Emma Jørgensen
- Medals Ranked 25th: Gold 3 Silver 4 Bronze 4 Total 11

Summer Olympics appearances (overview)
- 1896; 1900; 1904; 1908; 1912; 1920; 1924; 1928; 1932; 1936; 1948; 1952; 1956; 1960; 1964; 1968; 1972; 1976; 1980; 1984; 1988; 1992; 1996; 2000; 2004; 2008; 2012; 2016; 2020; 2024

Other related appearances
- 1906 Intercalated Games

Denmark competed at the 2020 Summer Olympics in Tokyo. Originally scheduled to take place from 24 July to 9 August 2020, the Games were postponed to 23 July to 8 August 2021, because of the COVID-19 pandemic. Danish athletes have appeared in every edition of the Summer Olympic Games, with the exception of the 1904 Summer Olympics in St. Louis. Before the start of the games, DIF sat an official medal goal of 8–10 medals for the Tokyo games.

Denmark stood with 108 athletes in 16 sports. Danish athletes won a total of 11 medals (3 gold, 4 silver and 4 bronze) at the Tokyo Olympiad. This was the most gold medals won by Denmark since the 1996 Summer Olympics, and the fifth highest amount of medals won in the Summer Olympics. Three of these 11 medals were won in cycling, two in canoeing and one each in badminton, handball, rowing, sailing, shooting and swimming.

Among the Danish medalists were Viktor Axelsen, winning gold in men's singles in badminton. He became the second Danish gold medalist in badminton, the first being Poul-Erik Høyer Larsen in 1996. Former gold medalist Pernille Blume won bronze in Women's 50 m freestyle swimming, marking her third Olympic medal in her career. Emma Jørgensen also reached three Olympic medals, having a silver medal from the 2016 Olympics and winning two bronze medals in canoeing at the 2020 Olympics. The Danish national handball team won Denmark's first silver medal in handball, having previously won four gold medals. Lasse Norman Hansen won his fourth and fifth Olympic medals, winning silver in men's team pursuit and gold in men's madison. This tied Hansen for most medals won by an individual Danish athlete, tying with Niels Larsen, Eskild Ebbesen and Lars Jørgen Madsen.

The Danish NOC represented not only Denmark, but also the constituent countries of Greenland and the Faroe Islands, neither of which have their own NOC. With the men's handball team winning a silver medal, Faroese handball player Jóhan Hansen became the first Faroese athlete to win a medal.

== Medalists ==
Medal	Name	Sport	Event	Date
Gold	Anne-Marie Rindom	Sailing	Women's Laser Radial	1 August
Gold	Viktor Axelsen	Badminton	Men's singles	2 August
Gold	Lasse Norman Hansen; Michael Mørkøv	Cycling	Men's madison	7 August
Silver	Jesper Hansen	Shooting	Men's skeet	26 July
Silver	Lasse Norman Hansen; Niklas Larsen; Frederik Rodenberg; Rasmus Pedersen	Cycling	Men's team pursuit	4 August
Silver	Amalie Dideriksen; Julie Leth	Cycling	Women's madison	6 August
Silver	Denmark men's national handball team: Niklas Landin Jacobsen; Magnus Landin Jacobsen; Emil Jakobsen; Magnus Saugstrup; Lasse Svan Hansen; Kevin Møller; Henrik Møllgaard; Mads Mensah Larsen; Henrik Toft Hansen; Mikkel Hansen; Morten Olsen; Jóhan Hansen; Lasse Andersson; Jacob Holm; Mathias Gidsel	Handball	Men's tournament	7 August
Bronze	Joachim Sutton; Frederik Vystavel	Rowing	Men's coxless pair	29 July
Bronze	Pernille Blume	Swimming	Women's 50 m freestyle	1 August
Bronze	Emma Jørgensen	Canoeing	Women's K-1 200 metres	3 August
Bronze	Emma Jørgensen	Canoeing	Women's K-1 500 metres	5 August

Medals by sport
Sport	1st place, gold medalist(s)	2nd place, silver medalist(s)	3rd place, bronze medalist(s)	Total
Badminton	1	0	0	1
Canoeing	0	0	2	2
Cycling	1	2	0	3
Handball	0	1	0	1
Rowing	0	0	1	1
Sailing	1	0	0	1
Shooting	0	1	0	1
Swimming	0	0	1	1
Total	3	4	4	11

== Competitors ==
The following is the list of number of competitors participating in the Games:

Sport	Men	Women	Total
Archery	0	1	1
Athletics	9	8	17
Badminton	5	4	9
Canoeing	0	4	4
Cycling	11	7	18
Equestrian	2	3	5
Golf	2	2	4
Handball	14	0	14
Judo	0	1	1
Rowing	3	6	9
Sailing	3	5	8
Shooting	2	2	4
Skateboarding	1	0	1
Swimming	3	8	11
Table tennis	1	0	1
Wrestling	1	0	1
Total	57	51	108

== Archery ==
One Danish archer qualified for the women's individual recurve by securing one of three remaining spots available in the secondary tournament at the 2019 World Archery Championships in 's-Hertogenbosch, Netherlands. On 8 October 2019, London 2012 Olympian and 2013 world champion Maja Jager became the first Danish athlete to be officially selected to the roster for Tokyo 2020.

Jager was seeded 25th after the initial ranking round, which left her to compete against Indonesian Diananda Choirunisa in the first tournament round. Jager won this round 6–2. In the second round against Ksenia Perova, Jager and Perova started out by winning a set each and had a set draw. Perova won the fourth and fifth sets, eliminating Jager from the tournament.

Athlete	Event	Ranking round		Round of 64	Round of 32	Round of 16	Quarterfinals	Semifinals	Final / BM	
Athlete	Event	Score	Seed	Opposition Score	Opposition Score	Opposition Score	Opposition Score	Opposition Score	Opposition Score	Rank
Maja Jager	Women's individual	649	25	Choirunisa (INA); W 6–2	Perova (ROC); L 3–7	Did not advance				

== Athletics ==
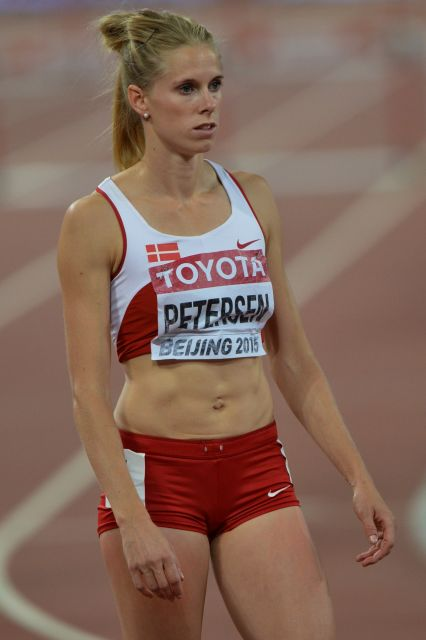
Sara Slott Petersen

Danish athletes further achieved the entry standards, either by qualifying time or by world ranking, in the following track and field events (up to a maximum of 3 athletes in each event):

On 27 March 2020, Rio 2016 silver medalist Sara Slott Petersen (women's 400 m hurdles) and steeplechaser Anna Emilie Møller became the first Danish track and field athletes to be named to the rescheduled Tokyo 2020 squad, with marathon runners Abdi Hakin Ulad and Thijs Nijhuis joining them nearly a month later.

Both the men's and women's relay teams broke the Danish national records, despite neither qualifying for the final. Silver medalist from 2016 Sara Slott Petersen competed in women's 400 m hurdles, qualifying to the semifinal after finishing 3rd in her initial heat. In the semi final, rain caused the field to get slippery and Slott crashed. As a result she didn't qualify to the final. Ole Hesselbjerg and Anna Emilie Møller competed in the 3000 metres steeplechase, men's and women's respectively. Neither qualified from their initial heats, Hesselbjerg finishing 8th and Møller finishing 9th. Møller's time of 9:31.99 was her season's best. Kojo Musah ran in the men's 100 m, as the first Danish athlete since 1928. He had reached the qualifying standard and was able to skip the preliminary rounds, moving straight to the round one heats. In his heat he finished in fifth place and didn't qualify for the semifinal. Two Danish athletes competed in the men's marathon: Thijs Nijhuis and Abdi Hakin Ulad. Both completed the marathon. Nijhuis finished in 70th place with a time of 2:26:59, and Ulad finished in 23rd place with a time of 2:15:50. For both men, this was their season's best.

Key

- Note–Ranks given for track events are within the athlete's heat only
- Q = Qualified for the next round
- q = Qualified for the next round as a fastest loser or, in field events, by position without achieving the qualifying target
- NR = National record
- N/A = Round not applicable for the event
- Bye = Athlete not required to compete in round

Track & road events
Men

Athlete	Event	Heat		Quarterfinal		Semifinal		Final	
Athlete	Event	Result	Rank	Result	Rank	Result	Rank	Result	Rank
Kojo Musah	100 m	Bye		10.20	5	Did not advance			
Ole Hesselbjerg	3000 m steeplechase	8:24.08	8	—N/a				Did not advance	
Simon Hansen; Tazana Kamanga-Dyrbak; Kojo Musah; Frederik Schou-Nielsen	4 × 100 m relay	38.16	7 NR	—N/a				Did not advance	
Thijs Nijhuis	Marathon	—N/a						2:26:59	70
Abdi Hakin Ulad	Marathon	—N/a						2:15:50	23

Women

Athlete	Event	Heat		Semifinal		Final	
Athlete	Event	Result	Rank	Result	Rank	Result	Rank
Sara Slott Petersen	400 m hurdles	55.52	3 Q	DNF		Did not advance	
Anna Emilie Møller	3000 m steeplechase	9:31.99 SB	9	—N/a		Did not advance	
Emma Beiter Bomme; Astrid Glenner-Frandsen; Ida Karstoft; Mathilde Kramer	4 × 100 m relay	43.51 NR	7	—N/a		Did not advance	

== Badminton ==
Denmark entered nine badminton players (five men and nine women) for the following events based on the BWF Race to Tokyo Rankings; two entries in the men's singles, one in the women's singles, and a pair each in the men's, women's, and mixed doubles.

In the mixed doubles event Denmark stood with one team consisting of Mathias Christiansen and Alexandra Bøje. In the initial group stage they lost two matches and won. Their one win was not enough to qualify to the quarter finals. Two other teams represented Denmark, one in men's doubles and one in women's doubles. The women's team consisted of Maiken Fruergaard and Sara Thygesen. They lost two matches in the group stage, but won against the fourth-seeded Lee So-hee and Shin Seung-chan. Kim Astrup and Anders Skaarup Rasmussen made up the team for the men's doubles. In the group stage they won two matches and lost one, which allowed them to qualify to the quarterfinals. Here they faced Chinese Li Junhui and Liu Yuchen. The Danish double won one set, as did the Chinese. In the final set the two Danes lost in a close 19–21 finish.

Three Danish badminton players took part in the singles events. Mia Blichfeldt competed in the women's singles, winning both matches in the group stage and qualifying to the elimination stage. In the elimination stage she faced off against Indian P. V. Sindhu, who she had previously competed against on five different occasions, four of which she had lost. She also lost this match against her, losing both sets. Two Danish athletes competed in the men's singles: Anders Antonsen and Viktor Axelsen. Antonsen won both matches in the group stage, qualifying him for the elimination stage where he faced off against British Toby Penty. Antonsen won both sets and the match, moving him on to the quarterfinals. Here he was to compete against Indonesian Anthony Sinisuka Ginting. Antonsen and Ginting each won a set, and in the final set Ginting defeated Antonsen 21–18. Viktor Axelsen also won both matches in the group stage, and defeated Taiwanese Wang Tzu-wei in the elimination stage. In the quarterfinal he defeated Chinese Shi Yuqi and in the semifinal he beat Guatemalan Kevin Cordón. This left him in a final against Chinese Chen Long. He won both sets in the final, winning him a gold medal. This was the first Danish gold medal in badminton since the 1996 Summer Olympics, where Poul-Erik Høyer Larsen won. Axelsen went through the Tokyo Olympics without losing a single set.

Men

Athlete	Event	Group Stage				Elimination	Quarterfinal	Semifinal	Final / BM	
Athlete	Event	Opposition Score	Opposition Score	Opposition Score	Rank	Opposition Score	Opposition Score	Opposition Score	Opposition Score	Rank
Anders Antonsen	Singles	Nguyễn (VIE); W (21–13, 21–13)	Dwicahyo (AZE); W (21–16, 21–15)	—N/a	1 Q	Penty (GBR); W (21–10, 21–15)	Ginting (INA); L (18–21, 21–15, 18–21)	Did not advance		
Viktor Axelsen	Singles	Wraber (AUT); W (21–12, 21–11)	Koljonen (FIN); W (21–9, 21–13)	—N/a	1 Q	Wang T-w (TPE); W (21–16, 21–14)	Shi Yq (CHN); W (21–13, 21–13)	Cordón (GUA); W (21–18, 21–11)	Chen L (CHN); W (21–15, 21–12)	1st place, gold medalist(s)
Kim Astrup; Anders Skaarup Rasmussen	Doubles	Ivanov / Sozonov (ROC); W (21–13, 21–18)	Olofua / Opeyori (NGR); W (21–7, 21–10)	Endo / Watanabe (JPN); L (14–21, 12–21)	2 Q	—N/a	Li Jh / Liu Yc (CHN); L (21–12, 14–21, 19–21)	Did not advance		

Women

Athlete	Event	Group Stage				Elimination	Quarterfinal	Semifinal	Final / BM	
Athlete	Event	Opposition Score	Opposition Score	Opposition Score	Rank	Opposition Score	Opposition Score	Opposition Score	Opposition Score	Rank
Mia Blichfeldt	Singles	Chen (AUS); W (21–7, 21–14)	Zechiri (BUL); W (21–10, 21–3)	—N/a	1 Q	Sindhu (IND); L (15–21, 13–21)	Did not advance			
Maiken Fruergaard; Sara Thygesen	Doubles	Du Y / Li Yh (CHN); L (13–21, 15–21)	Lee S-h / Shin S-c (KOR); W (15–21, 21–19, 22–20)	Mapasa / Somerville (AUS); L (19–21, 21–13, 12–21)	4	—N/a	Did not advance			

Mixed

Athlete	Event	Group Stage				Quarterfinal	Semifinal	Final / BM	
Athlete	Event	Opposition Score	Opposition Score	Opposition Score	Rank	Opposition Score	Opposition Score	Opposition Score	Rank
Mathias Christiansen; Alexandra Bøje	Doubles	Watanabe / Higashino (JPN); L (22–20, 11–21, 15–21)	Jordan / Oktavianti (INA); L (22–24, 19–21)	Leung / Somerville (AUS); W (21–6, 21–14)	3	Did not advance			

== Canoeing ==
=== Sprint ===
Danish canoeists qualified three boats in each of the following distances for the Games through the 2019 ICF Canoe Sprint World Championships in Szeged, Hungary. The women's kayaking squad, led by Rio 2016 silver medalist Emma Åstrand Jørgensen, was named to the Danish roster on 28 May 2021.

Sara Milthers and Emma Åstrand Jørgensen both competed in the women's K-1 200 m. Milthers finished 6th in the initial heat, meaning she had to compete in the quarterfinals. Here she finished fifth, which wasn't enough to qualify to the semifinals. Jørgensen meanwhile finished 1st in her initial heat, qualifying her straight to the semifinals. Here she finished 2nd, which allowed her to compete in the medal-giving final, where she finished 3rd and won bronze. Jørgensen also won bronze in women's K-1 500 m. She finished 2nd in the initial heat and 2nd again in the semifinals, then third in the final. She became the only Danish athlete to win more than one medal in the Tokyo Olympics. Julie Frølund Funch and Bolette Nyvang Iversen competed in the women's K-2 500 m. They finished fifth in the initial heat, which wasn't enough to qualify to the semifinals. They instead had to try and qualify from the quarterfinals, though finished fifth again and didn't manage to qualify to the semifinals. All four canoers competed together in the women's K-4 500 m. They came in fifth place in their initial heat, meaning they had to take part in the quarterfinals. Here they finished 6th, qualifying them for the semifinals. In the semifinal they came in fourth place, allowing them to take part in the medal-giving final race. In the final they finished last, in 8th place.

Athlete	Event	Heats		Quarterfinals		Semifinals		Final	
Athlete	Event	Time	Rank	Time	Rank	Time	Rank	Time	Rank
Sara Milthers	Women's K-1 200 m	43.863	6 QF	43.675	5	Did not advance			
Emma Aastrand Jørgensen	Women's K-1 200 m	41.572	1 SF	Bye		38.457	2 FA	38.901	3rd place, bronze medalist(s)
Emma Aastrand Jørgensen	Women's K-1 500 m	1:49.231	2 SF	Bye		1:52.931	2 FA	1:52.773	3rd place, bronze medalist(s)
Julie Funch; Bolette Nyvang Iversen	Women's K-2 500 m	1:52.730	5 QF	1:52.678	5	Did not advance			
Julie Funch; Bolette Nyvang Iversen; Emma Åstrand Jørgensen; Sara Milthers	Women's K-4 500 m	1:38.453	5 QF	1:37.682	6 SF	1:37.386	4 FA	1:41.141	8

Qualification Legend: FA = Qualify to final (medal); FB = Qualify to final B (non-medal)

== Cycling ==
=== Road ===
Denmark entered a squad of six riders (four men and two women) to compete in their respective Olympic road races, by virtue of their top 50 national finish (for men) and top 22 (for women) in the UCI World Ranking.

Kasper Asgreen competed in men's time trial. Asgreen had won the 2021 Tour of Flanders earlier in the year, and had competed in the 2021 Tour de France a month earlier. He finished 7th in the Olympic time trial, with a time of 56:52.21. Four Danish athletes competed in the men's road race: Kasper Asgreen, Jakob Fuglsang, Christopher Juul Jensen and Michael Valgren. Fuglsang, like Asgreen, had competed in the 2021 Tour de France a month earlier. Fuglsang finished the Olympic road race in 12th place, and Valgreen finished in 78th. Asgreen and Jensen did not complete the race. In the women's road race, 2 athletes competed: Emma Norsgaard Jørgensen and Cecilie Uttrup Ludwig. Jørgensen crashed during the race and didn't finish. Ludwig finished in 10th place with the leading group of the race. Jørgensen also competed in women's time trial, where she finished in 17th place with a time of 33:50.18.

Athlete	Event	Time	Rank
Kasper Asgreen	Men's road race	Did not finish	
Kasper Asgreen	Men's time trial	56:52.21	7
Jakob Fuglsang	Men's road race	6:08:09	12
Christopher Juul Jensen	Men's road race	Did not finish	
Michael Valgren	Men's road race	6:21:46	78
Emma Norsgaard Jørgensen	Women's road race	Did not finish	
Emma Norsgaard Jørgensen	Women's time trial	33:50.18	17
Cecilie Uttrup Ludwig	Women's road race	3:54:31	10

=== Track ===
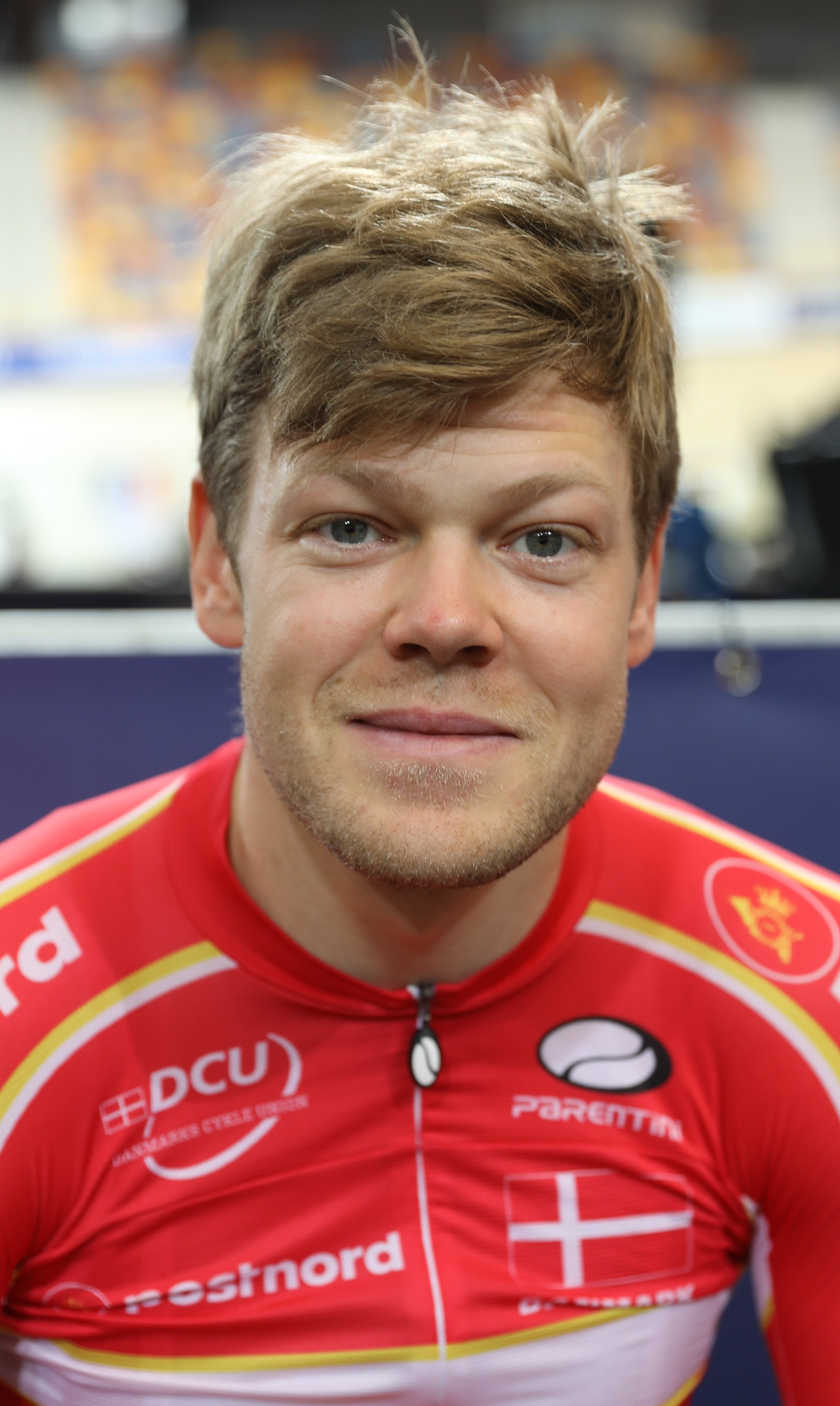
Lasse Norman Hansen

Following the completion of the 2020 UCI Track Cycling World Championships, Danish riders accumulated spots for both men and women in madison and omnium, as well as the men's team pursuit, based on their country's results in the final UCI Olympic rankings. The track cycling squad, highlighted by multiple Olympic medalist Lasse Norman Hansen in the men's pursuit and omnium, was named on 2 June 2021.

The Danish men's pursuit team consisted of Hansen, Niklas Larsen, Rasmus Pedersen and Frederik Rodenberg. Julius Johansen was chosen as reserve. Larsen, Hansen and Rodenberg had all won medals in the 2016 Olympics. In the qualification heat of the team pursuit, the team finished in first place with a time of 3:45.014, setting an Olympic record. The first place finish qualified them for the semifinals, where they were up against the British team, made up of Ethan Hayter, Ed Clancy, Ethan Vernon, Oliver Wood and Charlie Tanfield. In the semifinal Denmark was in the lead, an on route to win the match, but Frederik Rodenberg collided with British Charlie Tanfield, who had fallen behind the rest of his team. The crew were supposed to announce that a British cyclist had fallen behind, and without the announcement that Rodenberg was not looking up and crashed into Tanfield. Denmark had already won the match when the crash happened, but the contest's crew had failed to end the race. The Danish team moved on to the gold medal race, while Great Britain ended in the seventh-place final. The Danish team went up against the Italian team in the final. The Italian team consisted of Simone Consonni, Filippo Ganna, Francesco Lamon and Jonathan Milan. Denmark got a time of 3:42.198 and Italy got a time of 3:42.032, both teams breaking the world record. Italy's time was faster, and their team won the gold medal while the Danish team won silver.

Two of the members on the Danish men's pursuit team also competed in other events. Niklas Larsen competed in men's omnium. He finished fifth in the scratch race, sixth in the tempo race, eighth in the elimination race and sixth in the points race, giving him a final placement of 5th, behind French Benjamin Thomas. Amalie Dideriksen competed in the women's omnium, placing 8th in the scratch race, 6th in the tempo race, 3rd in the elimination race and 4th in the points race. This gave her a final placement of 4th place, five points behind bronze medalist Kirsten Wild from the Netherlands.

The other member of the Danish pursuit team to compete in another event was Lasse Norman Hansen, who competed in the men's madison with Michael Mørkøv. They finished with 43 points in first place, winning a gold medal. Amalie Dideriksen, who competed in the women's omnium, also competed in the women's madison. She paired up with Julie Leth. The two of them won 35 points, finishing in second place and winning a silver medal. First place was won by British Katie Archibald and Laura Kenny with 78 points.

Pursuit

Athlete	Event	Qualification		Semifinals		Final	
Athlete	Event	Time	Rank	Opponent Results	Rank	Opponent Results	Rank
Niklas Larsen; Lasse Norman Hansen; Rasmus Pedersen; Frederik Rodenberg	Men's team pursuit	3:45.014 OR	1 Q	Great Britain; No time	2 Q	Italy; 3:42.198	2nd place, silver medalist(s)

Omnium

Athlete	Event	Scratch race		Tempo race		Elimination race		Points race		Total points	Rank
Athlete	Event	Rank	Points	Rank	Points	Rank	Points	Rank	Points	Total points	Rank
Niklas Larsen	Men's omnium	5	32	6	30	8	26	6	25	113	5
Amalie Dideriksen	Women's omnium	8	26	6	32	3	36	4	11	103	4

Madison

Athlete	Event	Points	Laps	Rank
Lasse Norman Hansen; Michael Mørkøv	Men's madison	43	—	1st place, gold medalist(s)
Amalie Dideriksen; Julie Leth	Women's madison	35	20	2nd place, silver medalist(s)

=== Mountain biking ===
Danish mountain bikers qualified for three quota places (one men's and two women's) into the Olympic cross-country race, as a result of the nation's thirteenth-place-finish for men and fourteenth for women, respectively, in the UCI Olympic Ranking List of 16 May 2021. The mountain biking squad was named to the Olympic roster on 27 May 2021.

Sebastian Fini Carstensen competed in the men's cross-country. He finished with a time of 1:30:28, 5 minutes and 14 seconds after winner Thomas Pidcock from Great Britain. This gave Carstensen a 22nd place. Two Danish athletes competed in the women's cross-country, those being Malene Degn and Caroline Bohé. The two Danish cyclists finished in 12th and 13th respectively, with Degn's time of 1:20:34 being 4 minutes and 48 seconds slower than the winner Jolanda Neff from Switzerland. Bohé finished 23 seconds after Degn, with a time of 1:20:57.

Athlete	Event	Time	Rank
Sebastian Fini Carstensen	Men's cross-country	1:30:28	22
Caroline Bohé	Women's cross-country	1:20:57	13
Malene Degn	Women's cross-country	1:20:34	12

=== BMX ===
Danish riders qualified for one women's quota place in BMX at the Olympics, as a result of the nation's ninth-place finish in the UCI BMX Olympic Qualification Ranking List of 1 June 2021.

Simone Tetsche Christensen was the only Danish athlete competing in BMX. She competed in the women's race. In the quarterfinals she finished in 2nd place, which qualified her for the semifinals. Here she again finished 2nd, and qualified for the final. In the final she finished in 6th place with a time of 45.582, finishing under Australian Lauren Reynolds.

Athlete	Event	Quarterfinal		Semifinal		Final	
Athlete	Event	Points	Rank	Points	Rank	Result	Rank
Simone Tetsche Christensen	Women's race	7	2 Q	10	2 Q	45.582	6

== Equestrian ==
Denmark fielded a squad of three equestrian riders into the Olympic team dressage competition by finishing fourth overall and securing the first of three available berths for Group A and B at the European Championships in Rotterdam, Netherlands. Meanwhile, two more riders were added to the Danish roster by securing the fourth of six available slots, outside the group and continental selection, in the individual FEI Olympic dressage rankings and by finishing in the top two, outside the group selection of the individual FEI Olympic jumping rankings for Group A (North Western Europe), respectively.

=== Dressage ===
The Danish dressage team was revealed on June 25, 2021. Charlotte Heering and Bufranco were named the team alternates.

The three Danish dressage athletes competed individually in the individual dressage and competed together in the team dressage. Cathrine Dufour and Bohemian finished in overall 3rd place after the Grand Prix, and finished 1st in their group, giving them a direct spot in the Grand Prix Freestyle. Carina Cassøe Krüth and Heiline's Danciera also won their group, giving them a direct spot in the Grand Prix Freestyle. They finished 10th overall in the Grand Prix. Nanna Skodborg Merrald and Zack place 3rd in their group, which was initially not enough to advance in the competition, but their score of 73.168 was high enough to qualify them to the Grand Prix Freestyle. In the Grand Prix Freestyle, Merrald finished in 11th place and Krüth finished in 7th place. Dufour placed 4th, finishing below bronze medalist Charlotte Dujardin from Great Britain. In the team dressage the Danish team finished 3rd in the Grand Prix, qualifying them for the Grand Prix Special. Here they finished in 4th place, below the British team.

Athlete	Horse	Event	Grand Prix		Grand Prix Special		Grand Prix Freestyle		Overall	
Athlete	Horse	Event	Score	Rank	Score	Rank	Technical	Artistic	Score	Rank
Cathrine Dufour	Bohemian	Individual	81.056	3 Q	—N/a		81.929	93.086	87.507	4
Carina Cassøe Krüth	Heiline's Danciera	Individual	76.677	10 Q	—N/a		78.286	88.371	83.329	7
Nanna Skodborg Merrald	Zack	Individual	73.168	16 q	—N/a		76.357	85.429	80.893	11
Cathrine Dufour; Carina Cassøe Krüth; Nanna Skodborg Merrald	See above	Team	7435.0	3 Q	7540.0	4	—N/a		7540.0	4

Qualification Legend: Q = Qualified for the final; q = Qualified for the final as a lucky loser

=== Eventing ===
One Danish athletes qualified for eventing. This athlete was Peter Flarup, who had previously competed in the individual eventing at the 2008 Summer Olympics.

Peter Flarup and Fascination competed in the individual eventing, along with 62 other athletes. Flarup finished 34th in dressage, 47th in cross-country and 40th in jumping. This was not enough for Flarup and Fascination to qualify for the final, as only the top 25 athletes would qualify.

Athlete	Horse	Event	Dressage		Cross-country			Jumping						Total	
Athlete	Horse	Event	Dressage		Cross-country			Qualifier			Final			Total	
Athlete	Horse	Event	Penalties	Rank	Penalties	Total	Rank	Penalties	Total	Rank	Penalties	Total	Rank	Penalties	Rank
Peter Flarup	Fascination	Individual	33.70	34	67.20	100.90	47	4.00	104.90	40	Did not advance				

=== Jumping ===
One Danish athlete qualified for equestrian jumping: Andreas Schou with the horse Darc de Lux.

Andres Schou and Darc de Lux competed in the individual jumping. In the qualification stage they finished in tied 47th place, tying with Eugenio Garza, Emanuele Gaudiano, Roberto Terán and Jasmine Chen. This was not enough to qualify for the final.

Athlete	Horse	Event	Qualification		Final		
Athlete	Horse	Event	Penalties	Rank	Penalties	Time	Rank
Andreas Schou	Darc de Lux	Individual	9	=47	Did not advance		

== Golf ==
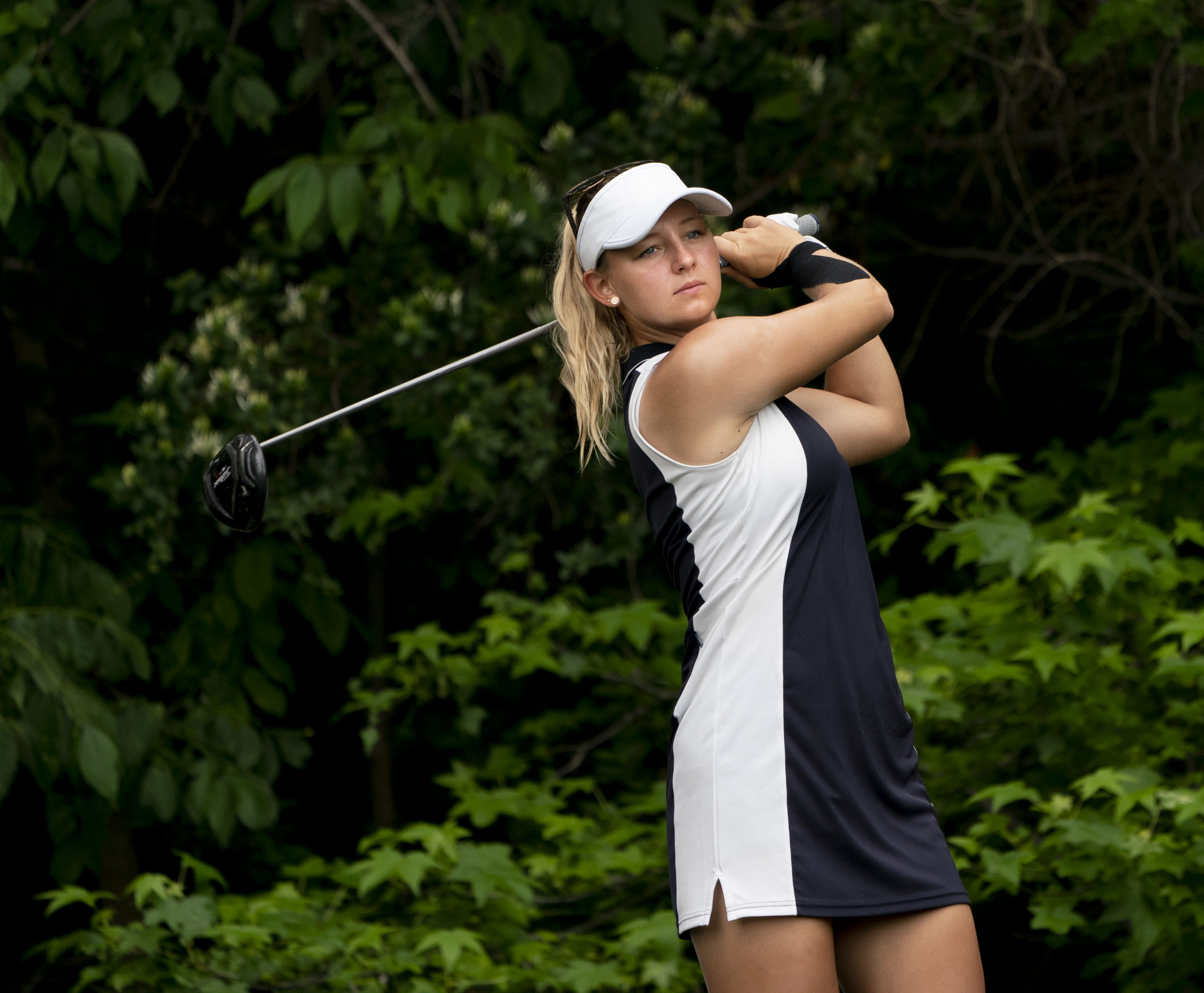
Emily Kristine Pedersen

Denmark entered two male and two female golfers into the Olympic tournament. The two men competing in the men's individual were Rasmus Højgaard and Joachim B. Hansen. Hansen tied for 27th while Højgaard tied for 38th. The two athletes competing in the women's individual were Nanna Koerstz Madsen and Emily Kristine Pedersen. Madsen tied for 9th and Pedersen tied for 5th. Pedersen was three points behind silver and bronze medalists Mone Inami and Lydia Ko.

Athlete	Event	Round 1	Round 2	Round 3	Round 4	Total		
Athlete	Event	Score	Score	Score	Score	Score	Par	Rank
Joachim B. Hansen	Men's	66	73	67	69	275	−9	=27
Rasmus Højgaard	Men's	73	68	66	71	278	−6	=38
Nanna Koerstz Madsen	Women's	69	64	72	69	274	−10	=9
Emily Kristine Pedersen	Women's	70	63	70	68	271	−13	=5

== Handball ==
Summary

Key:

- ET: After extra time
- P – Match decided by penalty-shootout.

Team	Event	Group Stage						Quarterfinal	Semifinal	Final	
Team	Event	Opposition Score	Opposition Score	Opposition Score	Opposition Score	Opposition Score	Rank	Opposition Score	Opposition Score	Opposition Score	Rank
Denmark men's	Men's tournament	Japan; W 47–30	Egypt; W 32–27	Bahrain; W 31–21	Portugal; W 34–28	Sweden; L 30–33	1 Q	Norway; W 31–25	Spain; W 27–23	France; L 23–25	2nd place, silver medalist(s)

=== Men's tournament ===
Denmark men's handball team qualified for the Olympics by winning the gold medal and securing an outright berth at the final match of the 2019 World Championships in Herning.

Denmark was placed in Group B with Japan, Bahrain, Portugal, Egypt and Sweden. In the group stage, the Danish men's handball team went on to win their first four matches against Japan, Egypt, Bahrain and Portugal, while losing the match against Sweden 30–33. With this result, the Danish men's team placed 1st in the group and qualified to the knockout stage. In the quarter-finals the Danish team went against the Norwegian team and won the match 31–25. In the semi-finals, the Danish team won against the Spanish team 27–23, qualifying Denmark for the final. In the final, the Danish team went up against the French team. Denmark lost the match 23–25 and won the silver medal, marking the first time Denmark had won a silver medal in handball, having previously only won gold.

Team roster

The squad was announced on 1 July 2021.

Head coach: Nikolaj Jacobsen

No.	Pos.	Name	Date of birth (age)	Height	App.	Goals	Club
1	GK	Niklas Landin Jacobsen	19 December 1988 (aged 32)	2.01 m	224	10	(Germany) THW Kiel
4	LW	Magnus Landin Jacobsen	20 August 1995 (aged 25)	1.97 m	78	163	(Germany) THW Kiel
7	LW	Emil Jakobsen	24 January 1998 (aged 23)	1.90 m	15	58	(Germany) SG Flensburg-Handewitt
15	P	Magnus Saugstrup	12 July 1996 (aged 25)	1.95 m	29	55	(Germany) SC Magdeburg
17	RW	Lasse Svan	31 August 1983 (aged 37)	1.85 m	227	536	(Germany) SG Flensburg-Handewitt
20	GK	Kevin Møller	20 June 1989 (aged 32)	2.00 m	40	5	(Germany) SG Flensburg-Handewitt
21	CB	Henrik Møllgaard	2 January 1985 (aged 36)	1.97 m	171	178	(Denmark) Aalborg Håndbold
22	CB	Mads Mensah Larsen	12 August 1991 (aged 29)	1.88 m	149	275	(Germany) SG Flensburg-Handewitt
23	P	Henrik Toft Hansen	18 December 1986 (aged 34)	2.00 m	131	234	(France) Paris Saint-Germain
24	LB	Mikkel Hansen	22 October 1987 (aged 33)	1.92 m	222	1121	(France) Paris Saint-Germain
25	CB	Morten Olsen	11 October 1984 (aged 36)	1.84 m	110	214	(Denmark) GOG Håndbold
26	RW	Jóhan Hansen	1 May 1994 (aged 27)	1.90 m	44	95	(Germany) TSV Hannover-Burgdorf
28	LB	Lasse Andersson	11 March 1994 (aged 27)	1.90 m	44	52	(Germany) Füchse Berlin
32	LB	Jacob Holm	5 September 1995 (aged 25)	1.94 m	39	100	(Germany) Füchse Berlin
33	RB	Mathias Gidsel	8 February 1999 (aged 22)	1.90 m	16	68	(Denmark) GOG Håndbold

Group play

Pos	Team	Pld	W	D	L	GF	GA	GD	Pts	Qualification
1	Denmark	5	4	0	1	174	139	+35	8 (Note: Denmark 2 Pts, +2 GD; Egypt 2 Pts, 0 GD, Sweden 2 Pts, −2 GD)	Quarter-finals
2	Egypt	5	4	0	1	154	134	+20	8	Quarter-finals
3	Sweden	5	4	0	1	144	142	+2	8	Quarter-finals
4	Bahrain	5	1	0	4	129	149	−20	2 (Note: Bahrain 2 Pts, +1 GD; Portugal 2 Pts, 0 GD, Japan 2 Pts, −1 GD)	Quarter-finals
5	Portugal	5	1	0	4	143	156	−13	2	
6	Japan (H)	5	1	0	4	146	170	−24	2	

Source: Tokyo 2020 and IHF
Rules for classification: 1) Points; 2) Head-to-head points; 3) Head-to-head goal difference; 4) Head-to-head goals scored; 5) Goal difference; 6) Goals scored; 7) Draw.
(H) Hosts
Notes:

24 July 2021; 21:30	Denmark	47–30	Japan	Yoyogi National Gymnasium, Tokyo; Referees: Schulze, Tönnies (GER)
24 July 2021; 21:30	Holm, Saugstrup 9	(25–14)	Motoki 8	Yoyogi National Gymnasium, Tokyo; Referees: Schulze, Tönnies (GER)
24 July 2021; 21:30	1× (yellow card) 1× (suspension)	Report	1× (yellow card) 4× (suspension)	Yoyogi National Gymnasium, Tokyo; Referees: Schulze, Tönnies (GER)

26 July 2021; 14:15	Egypt	27–32	Denmark	Yoyogi National Gymnasium, Tokyo; Referees: Raluy, Sabroso (ESP)
26 July 2021; 14:15	Hesham 6	(15–14)	M. Hansen 9	Yoyogi National Gymnasium, Tokyo; Referees: Raluy, Sabroso (ESP)
26 July 2021; 14:15	5× (suspension)	Report	2× (yellow card) 5× (suspension)	Yoyogi National Gymnasium, Tokyo; Referees: Raluy, Sabroso (ESP)

28 July 2021; 09:00	Denmark	31–21	Bahrain	Yoyogi National Gymnasium, Tokyo; Referees: Horáček, Novotný (CZE)
28 July 2021; 09:00	J. Hansen 6	(12–7)	four players 3	Yoyogi National Gymnasium, Tokyo; Referees: Horáček, Novotný (CZE)
28 July 2021; 09:00	1× (suspension)	Report	3× (yellow card) 3× (suspension)	Yoyogi National Gymnasium, Tokyo; Referees: Horáček, Novotný (CZE)

30 July 2021; 19:30	Portugal	28–34	Denmark	Yoyogi National Gymnasium, Tokyo; Referees: Nachevski, Nikolov (MKD)
30 July 2021; 19:30	Branquinho 4	(19–20)	M. Hansen 9	Yoyogi National Gymnasium, Tokyo; Referees: Nachevski, Nikolov (MKD)
30 July 2021; 19:30	1× (yellow card) 4× (suspension)	Report	3× (suspension)	Yoyogi National Gymnasium, Tokyo; Referees: Nachevski, Nikolov (MKD)

1 August 2021; 21:30	Denmark	30–33	Sweden	Yoyogi National Gymnasium, Tokyo; Referees: Schulze, Tönnies (GER)
1 August 2021; 21:30	Gidsel, J. Hansen 5	(13–17)	Carlsbogård, Sandell 6	Yoyogi National Gymnasium, Tokyo; Referees: Schulze, Tönnies (GER)
1 August 2021; 21:30	3× (yellow card) 2× (suspension)	Report	2× (yellow card) 6× (suspension)	Yoyogi National Gymnasium, Tokyo; Referees: Schulze, Tönnies (GER)

Quarterfinal

3 August 2021; 17:00	Denmark	31–25	Norway	Yoyogi National Gymnasium, Tokyo; Referees: Bonaventura, Bonaventura (FRA)
3 August 2021; 17:00	M. Hansen, Holm 8	(13–12)	Sagosen 8	Yoyogi National Gymnasium, Tokyo; Referees: Bonaventura, Bonaventura (FRA)
3 August 2021; 17:00	1× (yellow card) 4× (suspension)	Report	1× (yellow card) 3× (suspension) 1× (red card)	Yoyogi National Gymnasium, Tokyo; Referees: Bonaventura, Bonaventura (FRA)

Semifinal

5 August 2021; 21:00	Spain	23–27	Denmark	Yoyogi National Gymnasium, Tokyo; Referees: Brunner, Salah (SUI)
5 August 2021; 21:00	Dujshebaev, Figueras 5	(10–14)	M. Hansen 12	Yoyogi National Gymnasium, Tokyo; Referees: Brunner, Salah (SUI)
5 August 2021; 21:00	1× (yellow card) 4× (suspension)	Report	2× (suspension)	Yoyogi National Gymnasium, Tokyo; Referees: Brunner, Salah (SUI)

Gold medal game

7 August 2021; 21:00	France	25–23	Denmark	Yoyogi National Gymnasium, Tokyo; Referees: Nikolov, Nachevski (MKD)
7 August 2021; 21:00	Remili 5	(14–10)	M. Hansen 9	Yoyogi National Gymnasium, Tokyo; Referees: Nikolov, Nachevski (MKD)
7 August 2021; 21:00	4× (suspension)	Report	1× (yellow card) 1× (suspension)	Yoyogi National Gymnasium, Tokyo; Referees: Nikolov, Nachevski (MKD)

== Judo ==
Denmark entered one female judoka into the Olympic tournament based on the International Judo Federation Olympics Individual Ranking, signifying the nation's return to the sport for the first time since Seoul 1988.

The country's qualified judoka became Lærke Olsen, who competed in the women's –63 kg class. In the initial round she went up against Canadian Catherine Beauchemin-Pinard. Olsen lost the match 00–10. Beauchemin-Pinard would end up winning the bronze medal in the tournament.

Athlete	Event	Round of 32	Round of 16	Quarterfinals	Semifinals	Repechage	Final / BM	
Athlete	Event	Opposition Result	Opposition Result	Opposition Result	Opposition Result	Opposition Result	Opposition Result	Rank
Lærke Olsen	Women's –63 kg	Beauchemin-Pinard (CAN); L 00–10	Did not advance					

== Rowing ==
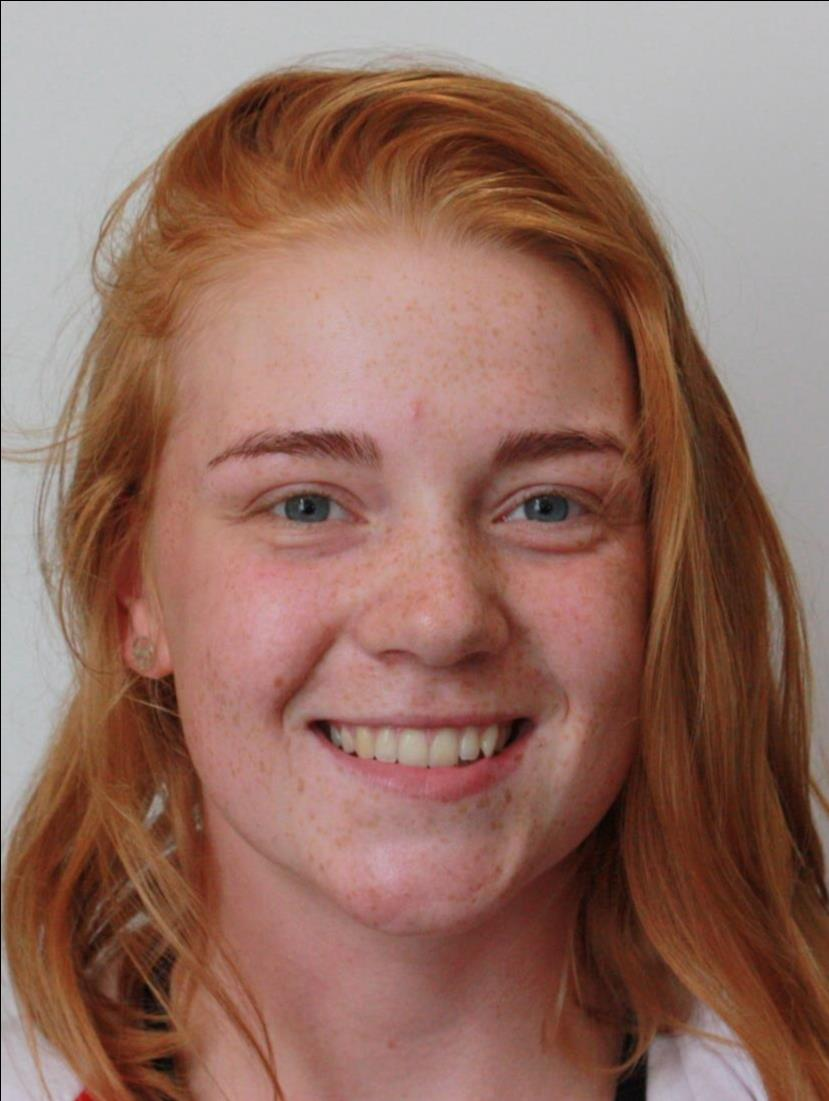
Frida Sanggaard Nielsen

Denmark qualified four boats for each of the following rowing classes into the Olympic regatta. Rowing crews in the men's single sculls and women's coxless four confirmed Olympic places for their boats at the 2019 FISA World Championships in Ottensheim, Austria. Meanwhile, two more crews (men's and women's pair) were added to the Danish roster with their top-two finish at the 2021 FISA Final Qualification Regatta in Lucerne, Switzerland.

Single sculls rower and current European champion Sverri Sandberg Nielsen was officially selected to the Danish roster for the rescheduled Games on 21 December 2020. The remaining crews that earned Olympic spots at the FISA Final Qualification Regatta were officially named to the Danish roster for the rescheduled Games on 1 June 2021, including Rio 2016 bronze medalist Hedvig Rasmussen and her newest partner Fie Udby Erichsen, a bronze medalist in the women's single sculls at London 2012, were named to the Danish roster on 1 June 2021.

Sverri Sandberg Nielsen, from the Faroe Islands, competed in the men's single sculls. In the initial heats, he finished first in his group with a time of 7:02.88. This qualified him for the quarterfinals. In the quarterfinals he finished first again, with a time of 7:10.52. This qualified him for the A/B-semi finals. Here he finished second with a time of 6:44.00, finishing 2.4 second after Greek Stefanos Ntouskos. His second place qualified him for the medal-giving A-final. In the final, he finished with a time of 6:42.73. Ntouskos won the gold medal with a time of 6:40.45, while Norwegian Kjetil Borch won the silver medal. Croatian Damir Martin won the bronze medal, finishing 0.15 seconds before Nielsen, who finished the competition in fourth place.

Two Danish teams competed in the coxless pair discipline, one for each gender. In the men's coxless pair the athletes were Joachim Sutton and Frederik Vystavel. In the initial heats, the pair finished second in their group with a time of 6:36.93. This qualified them for the A/B-semi finals where they finished in second place again, this time with a time of 6:14.88. This qualified them for the medal-giving A-final. Here they finished in third place with a time of 6:19.88, winning them the bronze medal. Croatians Sinković & Sinković won the gold medal and Romanian Cozmiuc & Tudosă won the silver medal. The Danish athletes competing in the women's coxless pair were Fie Udby Erichsen and Hedvig Rasmussen. In the initial heats, they finished second in their group with a time of 7:22.86. This qualified them for the A/B-semi finals. In the semi final they finished with a time of 7:08.44, finishing in last place in their group. This meant that they would qualify for the B-final, which would not give a medal. They finished in second place in the B-final, with a time of 6:59.48. This gave them eight place overall in the tournament.

Four athletes made up the Danish team competing in the women's coxless four. This team consisted of Ida Gørtz Jacobsen, Christina Juhl Johansen, Frida Sanggaard Nielsen and Trine Dahl Pedersen. In the initial heats, the team finished last in their group. Their time in the heat was 6:50.15. This meant they had to compete in the repechage for a chance to go to the medal-giving A-final. In the repechage they finished last again, however, with a time of 7:01.17. This left the team to compete in the B-final, where they finished second with a time of 6:34.72. This game them an overall eight placement in the tournament.

Men

Athlete	Event	Heats		Repechage		Quarterfinals		Semifinals		Final	
Athlete	Event	Time	Rank	Time	Rank	Time	Rank	Time	Rank	Time	Rank
Sverri Sandberg Nielsen	Single sculls	7:02.88	1 QF	Bye		7:10.52	1 SA/B	6:44.00	2 FA	6:42.73	4
Joachim Sutton; Frederik Vystavel	Pair	6:36.93	2 SA/B	Bye		—N/a		6:14.88	2 FA	6:19.88	3rd place, bronze medalist(s)

Women

Athlete	Event	Heats		Repechage		Semifinals		Final	
Athlete	Event	Time	Rank	Time	Rank	Time	Rank	Time	Rank
Fie Udby Erichsen; Hedvig Rasmussen	Pair	7:22.86	2 SA/B	Bye		7:08.44	6 FB	6:59.48	8
Ida Jacobsen; Christina Juhl Johansen; Frida Sanggaard Nielsen; Trine Dahl Pedersen	Four	6:50.15	5 R	7:01.17	6 FB	—N/a		6:34.72	8

Qualification Legend: FA=Final A (medal); FB=Final B (non-medal); FC=Final C (non-medal); FD=Final D (non-medal); FE=Final E (non-medal); FF=Final F (non-medal); SA/B=Semifinals A/B; SC/D=Semifinals C/D; SE/F=Semifinals E/F; QF=Quarterfinals; R=Repechage

== Sailing ==
Danish sailors qualified one boat in each of the following classes through the 2018 Sailing World Championships, the class-associated Worlds, and the continental regattas.

On 27 March 2020, Team Denmark announced the first set of sailors (49er, 49erFX, and Nacra 17 crews) selected for the rescheduled Games, including Beijing 2008 gold medalist Jonas Warrer. Rio 2016 windsurfer Lærke Buhl-Hansen, with Laser sailor and bronze medalist Anne-Marie Rindom going to her third consecutive Games, was added to the Danish sailing roster on 12 May 2020.

Men

Athlete	Event	Race													Net points	Final rank
Athlete	Event	1	2	3	4	5	6	7	8	9	10	11	12	M	Net points	Final rank
Jakob Precht Jensen; Jonas Warrer	49er	6	5	10	3	1	4	6	4	14	~~15~~	5	8	16	82	5

Women

Athlete	Event	Race													Net points	Final rank
Athlete	Event	1	2	3	4	5	6	7	8	9	10	11	12	M	Net points	Final rank
Lærke Buhl-Hansen	RS:X	~~9~~	4	8	4	9	8	6	5	5	8	9	9	18	93	7
Anne-Marie Rindom	Laser Radial	6	5	3	13	4	4	2	1	26	~~DNF~~	—N/a		15	78	1st place, gold medalist(s)
Ida Marie Baad Nielsen; Marie Thusgaard Olsen	49erFX	14	4	3	5	1	11	14	~~17~~	17	9	6	14	8	106	8

Mixed

Athlete	Event	Race													Net points	Final rank
Athlete	Event	1	2	3	4	5	6	7	8	9	10	11	12	M	Net points	Final rank
Christian Peter Lübeck; Lin Ea Cenholt	Nacra 17	8	8	10	7	2	4	~~13~~	11	11	1	3	1	4	70	4

M = Medal race; EL = Eliminated – did not advance into the medal race

== Shooting ==
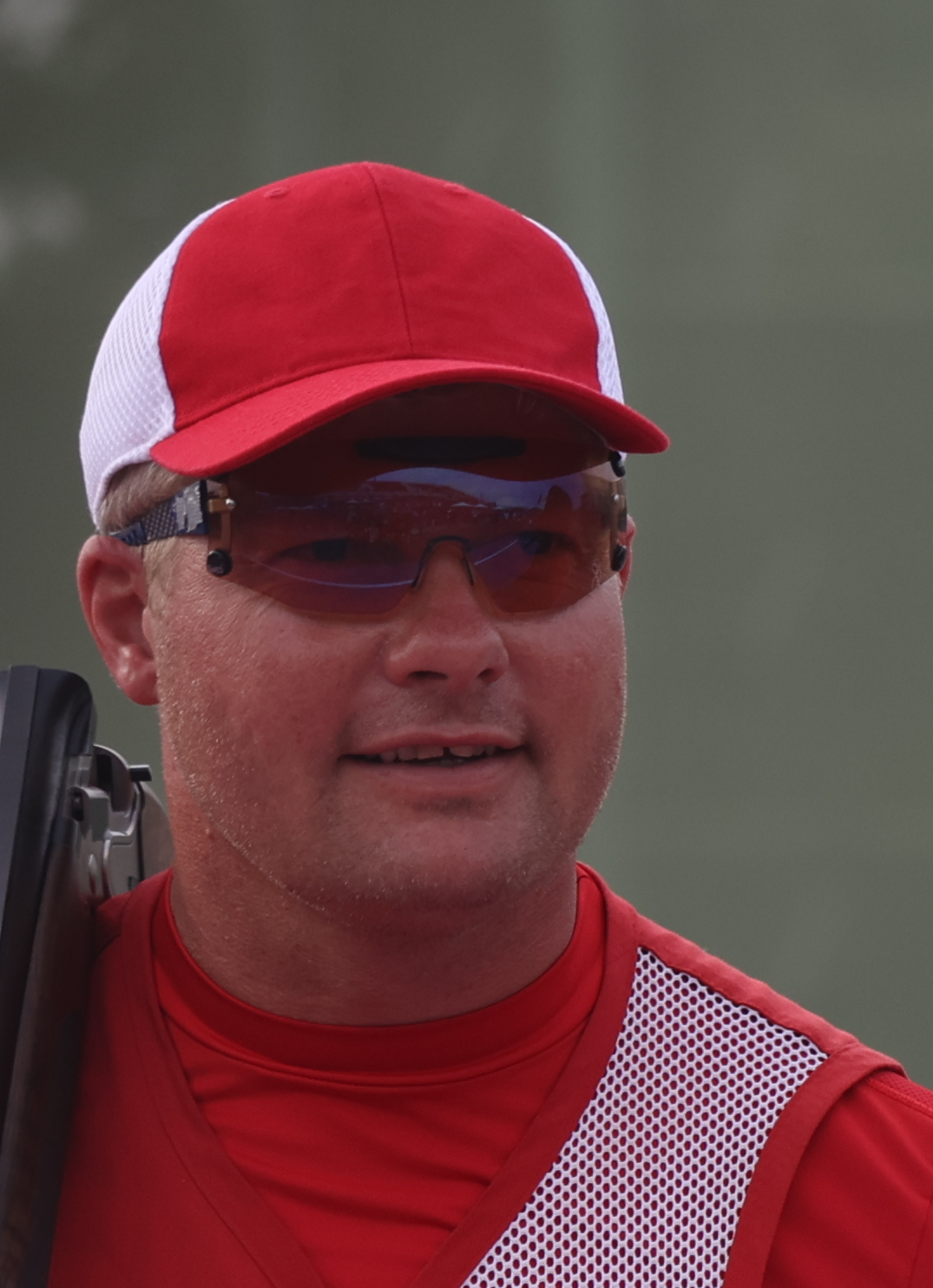
Jesper Hansen after winning a silver medal in men's skeet.

Danish shooters achieved quota places for the following events by virtue of their best finishes at the 2018 ISSF World Championships, the 2019 ISSF World Cup series, European Championships or Games, and European Qualifying Tournament, as long as they obtained a minimum qualifying score (MQS) by 31 May 2020.

Skeet shooter and 2013 world shotgun champion Jesper Hansen was officially selected to the Danish roster for his third consecutive Games on 14 November 2019. Steffen Olsen earned a direct place in the men's 50 m rifle 3 positions for the rescheduled Games as the highest-ranked shooter vying for qualification in the ISSF World Olympic Rankings of 6 June 2021.

Athlete	Event	Qualification		Semifinal		Final	
Athlete	Event	Points	Rank	Points	Rank	Points	Rank
Jesper Hansen	Men's skeet	122	6 Q	—N/a		55	2nd place, silver medalist(s)
Steffen Olsen	Men's 50 m rifle 3 positions	1160	28	—N/a		Did not advance	
Rikke Ibsen	Women's 10 m air rifle	625.0	22	—N/a		Did not advance	
Rikke Ibsen	Women's 50 m rifle 3 positions	1157	29	—N/a		Did not advance	
Anna Nielsen	Women's 10 m air rifle	623.3	28	—N/a		Did not advance	
Steffen Olsen; Anna Nielsen	Mixed 10 m air rifle team	623.1	21	Did not advance			

== Skateboarding ==
Athlete	Event	Qualification		Final	
Athlete	Event	Points	Rank	Points	Rank
Rune Glifberg	Men's park	37.61	19	Did not advance	

== Swimming ==
Danish swimmers further achieved qualifying standards in the following events (up to a maximum of 2 swimmers in each event at the Olympic Qualifying Time (OQT), and potentially 1 at the Olympic Selection Time (OST)):

Men

Athlete	Event	Heat		Semifinal		Final	
Athlete	Event	Time	Rank	Time	Rank	Time	Rank
Tobias Bjerg	100 m breaststroke	DSQ		Did not advance			
Anton Ipsen	800 m freestyle	7:54.98	21	—N/a		Did not advance	
Anton Ipsen	1500 m freestyle	15:01.58	14	—N/a		Did not advance	
Alexander Nørgaard	800 m freestyle	7:53.50	19	—N/a		Did not advance	
Alexander Nørgaard	1500 m freestyle	15:28.70	26	—N/a		Did not advance	

Women

Athlete	Event	Heat		Semifinal		Final	
Athlete	Event	Time	Rank	Time	Rank	Time	Rank
Helena Rosendahl Bach	1500 m freestyle	16:29.56	25	—N/a		Did not advance	
Helena Rosendahl Bach	200 m butterfly	2:09.37	10 Q	2:10.05	12	Did not advance	
Emilie Beckmann	100 m butterfly	58.84	22	Did not advance			
Pernille Blume	50 m freestyle	24.12	2 Q	24.08	2 Q	24.21	3rd place, bronze medalist(s)
Pernille Blume	100 m freestyle	52.96	7 Q	53.26	10	Did not advance	
Signe Bro	100 m freestyle	53.54	13 Q	53.55	12	Did not advance	
Julie Kepp Jensen	50 m freestyle	24.70	14 Q	24.98	16	Did not advance	
Pernille Blume; Signe Bro; Julie Kepp Jensen; Jeanette Ottesen	4 × 100 m freestyle relay	3:35.56	7 Q	—N/a		3:35.70	8
Emilie Beckmann; Pernille Blume; Clara Rybak-Andersen; Karoline Sørensen	4 × 100 m medley relay	4:04.04	15	—N/a		Did not advance	

== Table tennis ==
Denmark entered one athlete into the table tennis competition at the Games. Rio 2016 Olympian Jonathan Groth scored an outright semifinal victory to book one of three Olympic spots available in the men's singles at the 2019 European Games in Minsk, Belarus.

Athlete	Event	Preliminary	Round 1	Round 2	Round 3	Round of 16	Quarterfinals	Semifinals	Final / BM	
Athlete	Event	Opposition Result	Opposition Result	Opposition Result	Opposition Result	Opposition Result	Opposition Result	Opposition Result	Opposition Result	Rank
Jonathan Groth	Men's singles	Bye		Majoros (HUN); W 4–1	Gauzy (FRA); L 0–4	Did not advance				

== Wrestling ==
Denmark qualified one wrestler for the men's Greco-Roman 67 kg into the Olympic competition, as a result of his top six finish at the 2019 World Championships.

Key:

- VT (ranking points: 5–0 or 0–5) – Victory by fall.
- VB (ranking points: 5–0 or 0–5) – Victory by injury (VF for forfeit, VA for withdrawal or disqualification)
- PP (ranking points: 3–1 or 1–3) – Decision by points – the loser with technical points.
- PO (ranking points: 3–0 or 0–3) – Decision by points – the loser without technical points.
- ST (ranking points: 4–0 or 0–4) – Great superiority – the loser without technical points and a margin of victory of at least 8 (Greco-Roman) or 10 (freestyle) points.
- SP (ranking points: 4–1 or 1–4) – Technical superiority – the loser with technical points and a margin of victory of at least 8 (Greco-Roman) or 10 (freestyle) points.

Greco-Roman

Athlete	Event	Round of 16	Quarterfinal	Semifinal	Repechage	Final / BM	
Athlete	Event	Opposition Result	Opposition Result	Opposition Result	Opposition Result	Opposition Result	Rank
Fredrik Bjerrehuus	Men's −67 kg	Nasibov (UKR); L 1–3 ^{PP}	Did not advance		Surkov (ROC); L 0–3 ^{PO}	Did not advance	14
