= 2016–17 Håndboldligaen =

Håndboldligaen
- Season: 2016-17
- Champions: Aalborg Håndbold (3rd title)
- Relegated: Randers HH
- Champions League: Aalborg Håndbold; Skjern Håndbold
- EHF Cup: Bjerringbro-Silkeborg; TTH Holstebro; Ribe-Esbjerg HH
- Matches: 219
- Goals: 11,673 (53.3 per match)
- Top goalscorer: (Denmark) Jacob Holm & (Norway) Sander Sagosen (206 goals)
- Biggest home win: Skjern 38-20 Randers
- Biggest away win: GOG 19-37 Mors-Thy
- Highest scoring: GOG 34-37 Aalborg

The 2016–17 Håndboldligaen, known as the 888ligaen for sponsorship reasons, is the 81st season of the Håndboldligaen, Denmark's premier Handball league. The promoted teams from the 1st Division were Randers HH and TM Tønder.

Aalborg Håndbold won the title after beating Skjern Håndbold in the final over two matches, 26:26 at home and 32:25 away. Randers HH was relegated after finishing last in the regular season.

== Team information ==
Locations of the 2016–17 Håndboldligaen

The following 14 clubs compete in the Håndboldligaen during the 2016–17 season:

Team	Location	Arena	Capacity
Aalborg Håndbold	Aalborg	Jutlander Bank Arena	5,009
Aarhus Håndbold	Aarhus	Ceres Arena	5,001
Bjerringbro-Silkeborg	Bjerringbro	Silkeborg-Hallerne	2,845
GOG	Gudme	Gudme-Hallerne	2,265
HC Midtjylland	Herning	Messecenter Herning	3,350
KIF Kolding Copenhagen	Kolding Copenhagen	Tre-For Arena; Brøndby Hall	5,182; 5,063
Mors-Thy	Nykøbing Mors Thisted	Jyske Bank Mors Arena Thy Hallen	2,296 1,284
Randers HH	Randers	Arena Randers	3,000
Ribe-Esbjerg	Esbjerg Ribe	Blue Water Dokken Invactor Arena	3,386 1,976
Skanderborg	Skanderborg	Fælledhallen	2,000
Skjern	Skjern	Skjern Bank Arena	3,100
SønderjyskE	Sønderborg	Dybbølhallen	2,200
Tvis Holstebro	Holstebro	Idrætscenter Vest	3,250
TM Tønder	Tønder	Tønder Sport- og FritidsCenter	1,500

=== Personnel and kits ===
Following is the list of clubs competing in 2016–17 Håndboldligaen, with their manager, kit manufacturer and shirt sponsor.

Team	President	Head coach	Kit manufacturer	Shirt sponsor
Aalborg Håndbold	Jan Larsen	(Iceland) Aron Kristjánsson	hummel	Jutlander Bank
Aarhus Håndbold	Henrik Lundorff	(Denmark) Erik Veje Rasmussen	hummel	Sparkassen Kronjylland, Jytas
Bjerringbro-Silkeborg	Frank Lajer	(Denmark) Peter Bredsdorff-Larsen	adidas	Jyske Bank, Grundfos
GOG	Kasper Jørgensen	(Greenland) Jakob Larsen	Select	Fynske Bank, EnergiFyn
HC Midtjylland	Allan Witt	(Denmark) Morten Secher	hummel	eptools, KP Industri
KIF Kolding Copenhagen	Jens Boesen	(Spain) Antonio Carlos Ortega	H2O Sportswear	Jolly Cola, EWII
Mors-Thy Håndbold	Johannes Søndergaard	(Denmark) Jan Paulsen	hummel	Jyske Bank
Randers HH	Peter Hansen	(Denmark) Ole Bitsch	Salming	Jutlander Bank
Ribe-Esbjerg	Rikke Tangaa	(Denmark) Claus Uhrenholt	hummel	fros
Skanderborg	Jens Christensen	(Denmark) Nicolej Krickau	Puma	AVR, Skanderborg kommune
Skjern Håndbold	Henning Kjærgaard	(Denmark) Ole Nørgaard	Puma	Skjern Bank
SønderjyskE	Klaus B. Rasmussen	(Denmark) Morten Henriksen	Diadora	SeaDane Travel
TTH Holstebro	Jørgen S. Hansen	(Finland) Patrick Westerholm	hummel	Vestjysk Bank
TM Tønder	Uwe Nielsen	(Denmark) Claus Lyngsøe	hummel	Sparekassen Bredebro

== Regular season ==
=== Standings ===
Pos	Team	Pld	W	D	L	GF	GA	GD	Pts	Qualification or relegation
1	Aalborg Håndbold	26	20	1	5	727	630	+97	41	Championship Play-Off + Advance to Champions League
2	Bjerringbro-Silkeborg	26	19	0	7	731	689	+42	38	Championship Play-Off
3	TTH Holstebro	26	18	1	7	751	692	+59	37	Championship Play-Off
4	Skjern Håndbold	26	16	2	8	773	689	+84	34	Championship Play-Off
5	GOG Håndbold	26	16	0	10	755	715	+40	32	Championship Play-Off
6	Mors-Thy Håndbold	26	12	3	11	659	672	−13	27	Championship Play-Off
7	Ribe-Esbjerg HH	26	13	1	12	676	674	+2	27	Championship Play-Off
8	KIF Kolding København	26	12	2	12	675	666	+9	26	Championship Play-Off
9	Århus Håndbold	26	10	3	13	708	722	−14	23	
10	SønderjyskE Herrer	26	8	5	13	662	703	−41	21	
11	HC Midtjylland	26	9	2	15	663	703	−40	20	
12	Skanderborg Håndbold	26	6	4	16	673	715	−42	16	Relegation Play-Off
13	TM Tønder Håndbold	26	5	3	18	629	704	−75	13	Relegation Play-Off
14	Randers HH (R)	26	4	1	21	623	733	−110	9	Relegated

Updated to match(es) played on 29 March 2017. Source:
Rules for classification: 1) points; 2) Goal difference; 3) Goals scored.
(R) Relegated

! There's a new relegation playoff made in November 2014

=== Schedule and results ===
Home \ Away	AAL	AAR	BSV	GOG	HCM	KIF	MTH	RAN	REH	SKA	SKJ	SØN	TTH	TØN
Aalborg Håndbold		27–21	28–24	25–22	34–19	26–22	28–25	25–19	24–26	24–22	26–26	28–26	25–26	29–23
Århus Håndbold	26–31		22–27	29–30	26–21	32–27	29–27	36–24	24–31	35–25	37–33	23–22	23–40	33–29
Bjerringbro-Silkeborg	24–25	30–29		28–25	28–20	30–25	26–22	31–28	24–22	34–27	22–31	27–26	34–33	31–27
GOG Håndbold	34–37	33–27	37–33		28–21	34–29	19–37	36–24	29–27	31–30	34–28	36–27	25–23	27–29
HC Midtjylland	27–29	28–28	28–27	27–26		23–27	27–29	32–29	29–22	20–22	29–27	26–27	24–33	23–29
KIF Kolding København	30–31	21–27	28–24	18–20	27–27		29–29	30–26	21–22	35–30	27–30	31–30	23–24	27–20
Mors-Thy Håndbold	17–27	25–21	30–27	25–24	17–24	21–26		23–18	22–16	20–27	24–35	25–21	28–29	29–25
Randers HH	17–26	30–23	21–22	26–36	18–31	17–23	26–27		22–30	22–30	31–27	31–21	26–31	26–23
Ribe-Esbjerg HH	36–34	25–28	18–27	28–25	31–33	21–22	24–26	25–24		34–29	25–21	26–25	30–23	20–25
Skanderborg Håndbold	24–30	31–29	29–30	22–25	26–27	19–25	25–25	23–21	28–28		30–31	25–25	19–24	29–25
Skjern Håndbold	31–28	29–29	27–28	32–27	27–24	18–21	32–23	38–20	34–26	34–27		31–26	27–22	35–24
SønderjyskE Herrer	15–28	24–24	26–28	28–32	27–25	31–25	28–28	30–26	27–26	24–23	21–29		31–29	21–16
TTH Holstebro	26–24	25–22	28–31	30–29	32–26	32–30	35–27	33–30	24–26	33–27	32–31	31–31		25–20
TM Tønder Håndbold	22–28	27–25	27–34	25–31	27–22	22–26	24–28	21–21	24–31	24–24	26–29	22–22	23–28	

Legend: Blue = home team win; Yellow = draw; Red = away team win.

No. 1-8 from the regular season divided into two groups with the top two will advance to the semifinals

== Winner's playoff ==
=== Group 1 ===
Pos	Team	Pld	W	D	L	GF	GA	GD	Pts	Qualification
1	Aalborg Håndbold	6	3	1	2	167	162	+5	9	Advance to semifinals
2	Skjern Håndbold	6	4	0	2	161	155	+6	9	Advance to semifinals
3	GOG Håndbold	6	4	1	1	175	150	+25	9	
4	KIF Kolding København	6	0	0	6	141	177	−36	0	

Updated to match(es) played on 30 April 2017. Source:
Rules for classification: 1) points; 2) Goal difference; 3) Goals scored.

Home \ Away	AAL	GOG	KIF	SKJ
Aalborg Håndbold		26–34	26–22	32–24
GOG Håndbold	25–25		32–20	28–26
KIF Kolding København	27–29	29–33		20–29
Skjern Håndbold	30–29	24–23	28–23	

Legend: Blue = home team win; Yellow = draw; Red = away team win.

=== Group 2 ===
Pos	Team	Pld	W	D	L	GF	GA	GD	Pts	Qualification
1	Ribe-Esbjerg HH	6	4	1	1	152	143	+9	9	Advance to semifinals
2	Bjerringbro-Silkeborg	6	3	0	3	155	154	+1	8	Advance to semifinals
3	TTH Holstebro	6	3	1	2	165	153	+12	8	
4	Mors-Thy Håndbold	6	1	0	5	141	163	−22	2	

Updated to match(es) played on 30 April. Source:
Rules for classification: 1) points; 2) Goal difference; 3) Goals scored.

Home \ Away	BSV	MTH	REH	TTH
Bjerringbro-Silkeborg		24–25	28–22	26–33
Mors-Thy Håndbold	24–30		23–24	20–27
Ribe-Esbjerg HH	25–21	28–21		25–22
TTH Holstebro	25–26	30–28	28–28	

Legend: Blue = home team win; Yellow = draw; Red = away team win.

== Playoff ==
=== Semifinal ===
Date			Home team in the 1st match & 3rd match	Home team in the 2nd match	Results		
1st match	2nd match	3rd match	Home team in the 1st match & 3rd match	Home team in the 2nd match	1st match	2nd match	3rd match
10 May	13 May	16 May	Aalborg Håndbold	Bjerringbro-Silkeborg	28–26	29–27	31–23
11 May	14 May	17 May	Skjern Håndbold	Ribe-Esbjerg HH	26–24	26–31	–

! Best of three matches. In the case of a tie after the second match, a third match is played. Highest ranking team in the regular season has the home advantage in the first and possible third match.

=== 3rd place ===
Date			Home team in the 1st match & 3rd match	Home team in the 2nd match	Results		
1st match	2nd match	3rd match	Home team in the 1st match & 3rd match	Home team in the 2nd match	1st match	2nd match	3rd match
23 May	28 May	31 May	Bjerringbro-Silkeborg	Ribe-Esbjerg HH	30–29	26–32	–

! Best of three matches. In the case of a tie after the second match, a third match is played. Highest ranking team in the regular season has the home advantage in the first and possible third match.

=== Final ===
Date			Home team in the 1st match & 3rd match	Home team in the 2nd match	Results		
1st match	2nd match	3rd match	Home team in the 1st match & 3rd match	Home team in the 2nd match	1st match	2nd match	3rd match
25 may	28 May	5 June	Aalborg Håndbold	Skjern Håndbold	26–26	32–25	–

! Best of three matches. In the case of a tie after the second match, a third match is played. Highest ranking team in the regular season has the home advantage in the first and possible third match.

== Relegation playoff ==
No. 12-13 from Håndboldligaen and no. 2-3 from the first division is meet each other for the last 2 seats. The winner stays in the league. the loser relegated to Division 1,

! Best of three matches. In the case of a tie after the second match, a third match is played. Highest ranking team in the regular season has the home advantage in the first and possible third match.

=== Group 1 ===
Date			Home team in the 1st match & 3rd match	Home team in the 2nd match	Results		
1st match	2nd match	3rd match	Home team in the 1st match & 3rd match	Home team in the 2nd match	1st match	2nd match	3rd match
17 April	20 April	23 April	TM Tønder Håndbold	Skive fH	32–35	20–22	29–24

=== Group 2 ===
Date			Home team in the 1st match & 3rd match	Home team in the 2nd match	Results		
1st match	2nd match	3rd match	Home team in the 1st match & 3rd match	Home team in the 2nd match	1st match	2nd match	3rd match
17 April	21 April	26 April	Skanderborg Håndbold	TMS Ringsted	32–28	23–28	–

== Number of teams by regions ==
	Region	No. teams	Teams
1	Midtjylland	8	Aarhus Håndbold, Bjerringbro-Silkeborg, HC Midtjylland, Randers HH, Skanderborg Håndbold, Skjern Håndbold, Team Tvis Holstebro
2	Syddanmark	5	KIF Kolding København, GOG, Ribe-Esbjerg HH, SønderjyskE, TM Tønder
3	Nordjylland	2	Aalborg Håndbold, Mors-Thy Håndbold

== Top Goalscorer ==
As of matches played on 29 March 2017

=== Regular season ===
Rank	Player	Club	Goals	7M
1	(Denmark) Kasper Irming Andersen	Skanderborg Håndbold	163	35
2	(Denmark) Kristian Stoklund Larsen	TM Tønder Håndbold	158	77
3	(Denmark) Jacob Holm	Ribe-Esbjerg HH	144	0
4	(Sweden) Markus Olsson	Skjern Håndbold	138	0
5	(Denmark) Lasse Mikkelsen	Skjern Håndbold	134	63
5	(Norway) Sander Sagosen	Aalborg Håndbold	134	5
7	(Norway) Bjarte Myrhol	Skjern Håndbold	129	0
8	(Russia) Konstantin Igropulo	KIF Kolding København	128	32
9	(Denmark) Kasper Søndergaard	Skjern Håndbold	125	8
10	(Sweden) Marcus Dahlin	Mors-Thy Håndbold	123	0

=== Overall ===
Rank	Player	Club	Goals	7M
1	(Denmark) Jacob Holm	Ribe-Esbjerg HH	206	0
2	(Norway) Sander Sagosen	Aalborg Håndbold	206	11
3	(Denmark) Lasse Mikkelsen	Skjern Håndbold	191	99
4	(Sweden) Markus Olsson	Skjern Håndbold	179	0
5	(Norway) Bjarte Myrhol	Skjern Håndbold	173	0
6	(Denmark) Nikolaj Markussen	Bjerringbro-Silkeborg	163	0
7	(Denmark) Kasper Irming Andersen	Skanderborg Håndbold	163	35
8	(Denmark) Kristian Stoklund Larsen	TM Tønder Håndbold	158	77
9	(Denmark) Kasper Søndergaard	Skjern Håndbold	157	8
10	(Denmark) Rasmus Nielsen	Ribe-Esbjerg HH	154	37

== All Star Team ==
=== Regular season ===
- Goalkeeper: (Sweden) Mikael Aggefors (AAL)
- Left Wing: (Denmark) Magnus Bramming (TTH)
- Left Back: (Denmark) Jacob Holm (REH)
- Centre Back: (Norway) Sander Sagosen (AAL)
- Pivot: (Norway) Bjarte Myrhol (SKJ)
- Right Back: (Denmark) Kasper Søndergaard (SKJ)
- Right Wing: (Denmark) Kasper Kildelund (TTH)

=== Overall ===
- Goalkeeper: (Denmark) Kapser Larsen (MTH)
- Left Wing: (Denmark) Magnus Landin Jacobsen (KIF)
- Left Back: (Norway) Sander Sagosen (AAL)
- Centre Back: (Denmark) Allan Damgaard Espersen (BSV)
- Pivot: (Norway) Bjarte Myrhol (SKJ)
- Right Back: (Denmark) Niclas Kirkeløkke (GOG)
- Right Wing: (Denmark) Kasper Kildelund (TTH)

=== Coach of the season ===
(Denmark) Claus Uhrenholt - Ribe-Esbjerg HH
