= Turlan =

Turlan is a surname. Notable people with the surname include:

- Guillaume Turlan (born 1996), French rower
- Thibaud Turlan (born 1996), French rower
