= Jacob Holm =

Jacob Holm may refer to:

- Jacob Holm (industrialist) (1770–1845), Danish industrialist, ship owner and merchant
- Jacob Holm (handballer) (born 1995), Danish handball player
