= Anna Nielsen =

Anna Nielsen may refer to:

- Anna Nielsen (sport shooter)
- Anna Henriques-Nielsen (1881–1962), Danish stage and film actress
- Anna Nielsen (1803–1856), Danish stage actress and opera singer
