= Erik Veje Rasmussen =

Danish handball player (born 1959)

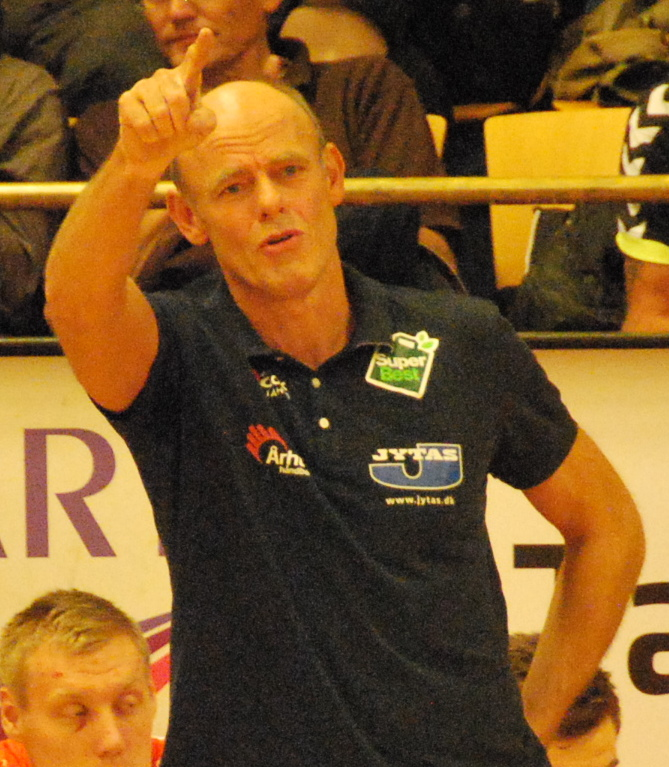
- Veje Rasmussen in September 2011. (Photo: Lars Schmidt)

Personal information
- Nationality: Danish
- Born: 9 April 1959 (age 67) Hørve, Denmark
- Height: 1.96 m (6 ft 5 in)

Sport
- Sport: Handball
- Position: Left back

Senior clubs
- Years: Team
- –: Vallekilde-Hørve
- –: Helsingør IF
- –: TuS Nettelstedt (Germany)
- –: S.C. Malaga (Spain)
- –: VfL Gummersbach (Germany)
- –: VHG Dragsholm
- –: Pfadi Winterthur (Switzerland)
- –: Roar Roskilde
- –: TSV St. Otmar St. Gallen (Switzerland)
National team
Years	Team	Apps	(Gls)
1980–1993	Denmark	233	(1015)

Teams managed
- 1994–1998: TSV St. Otmar St. Gallen (as player-coach)
- 1998–2003: SG Flensburg-Handewitt
- 2003–2009: Århus GF Håndbold
- 2010–2021: Århus GF Håndbold
- 2023–2024: Randers HH (sporting consultant)
- 2024–: Bjerringbro-Silkeborg (assistant coach)

Erik Veje Rasmussen (born 9 April 1959) is a Danish former handball player and handball coach who competed in the 1982 World Men's Handball Championship and 1984 Summer Olympics. In addition to Handball he is also an author, politician and inventor of sports clothing.

== Playing career ==
Veje Rasmussen started playing handball at Vallekilde-Hørve, his local club. From there he moved to Danish top club Helsingør IF, and was the top goalscorer of the 1983 Danish Handball League season.

After 2 seasons he moved abroad playing in both Germany, Switzerland and Spain. At St. Otmar he acted as player-coach in multiple instances.

During the 1980s he was one of the central players at the Danish National Team. In 1984 he finished fourth with the Denmark men's national handball team in the Olympic tournament. He played all six matches and scored 25 goals. Rasmussen played a total 233 games for the national team scoring 1015 goals. This makes him both the third most capped player and the thirds most scoring player for the Danish national team ever.

== Coaching career ==
Veje Rasmussen ended his playing career at the age of 39 to coach full time. He went on to coach the german club SG Flensburg-Handewitt from 1998 to 2003 before moving to Danish club Aarhus GF Håndbold. He led Århus to silver medals in the Danish League in 2005. In periods with many injuries, he did take the field himself. In 2009 he stopped at AGF due to health concerns, but his successor, René Hamann-Boerith, did not have success and was fired for bad results, and thus Veje Rasmussen returned to Aarhus Handball.

Despite the club having economic problems and had to release many key players, Veje Rasmussen managed a top half finish and reached the Cup final in the 10/11 season. He continued at Aarhus GF for 10 years, but after the club declared bankruptcy and fusioned with Skanderborg Håndbold, Veje Rasmussen decided not to continue.

In 2023 he began as a sports consulent for the Danish league club Randers HH.

In 2024 he was appointed assistant coach at Bjerringbro-Silkeborg Håndbold under Simon Sørensen, who was the assistant coach to Veje Rasmussen at Aarhus.

== Politics ==
Rasmussen ran for election in the 2022 Danish general election in Favrskov on behalf of the centre-right party Venstre. He received 2,447 personal votes, which made him the second substitute for Venstre.

At the 2026 Danish general election he received 1819 personal votes, but were not elected.

== Private life ==
Veje Rasmussen is educated as a teacher in 1986 and later in law in 1991. At the end of his playing career he worked as lawyer. He has also worked as an inventor of sports clothing.

He is married and has four children. One of his children, Nikolaj Veje Rasmussen, is also a professional handball player.

== See also ==
- List of men's handballers with 1000 or more international goals
