= Handball at the 2020 Summer Olympics – Men's tournament =

Men's handball at the XXXII Olympiad

Tournament details
- Host country: Japan
- Venue: Yoyogi National Gymnasium
- Dates: 24 July – 7 August 2021
- Teams: 12 (from 5 confederations)

Final positions
- Champions: France (3rd title)
- Runners-up: Denmark
- Third place: Spain
- Fourth place: Egypt

Tournament statistics
- Matches played: 38
- Goals scored: 2,204 (58 per match)
- Attendance: 0 (0 per match)
- Top scorers: (Denmark) Mikkel Hansen (61 goals)

Awards
- Best player: (Denmark) Mathias Gidsel

The men's handball tournament at the 2020 Summer Olympics was the 14th edition of the handball event for men at the Summer Olympic Games. It was held from 24 July to 7 August 2021. All games were played at the Yoyogi National Gymnasium in Tokyo, Japan.

It was originally scheduled to be held in 2020, but on 24 March 2020, the Olympics were postponed to 2021 due to the COVID-19 pandemic. Because of this pandemic, the games were played behind closed doors.

The final was a rematch of the previous between Denmark and France. After Denmark won 28–26 in the 2016 final, France got the upper hand with a 25–23 win this time. Spain won the bronze medal match against Egypt.

This meant that France won both gold medals as the first team since 1984.

The medals for the competition were presented by Jean-Christophe Rolland, IOC Member, Olympian, one Gold medal and one Bronze medal, France; and the medalists' bouquets were presented by Joël Delplanque, IHF 1st Vice-President, France.

== Schedule ==
Legend
| G | Group stage | ¼ | Quarter-finals | ½ | Semi-finals | B | Bronze medal match | F | Gold medal match |

| Sat 24 | Sun 25 | Mon 26 | Tue 27 | Wed 28 | Thu 29 | Fri 30 | Sat 31 | Sun 1 | Mon 2 | Tue 3 | Wed 4 | Thu 5 | Fri 6 | Sat 7 | |
|---|---|---|---|---|---|---|---|---|---|---|---|---|---|---|---|
| G | | G | | G | | G | | G | | ¼ | | ½ | | B | F |

== Qualification ==
| Qualification | Date | Host(s) | Vacancies | Qualified |
|---|---|---|---|---|
| Host nation | —N/a | —N/a | 1 | Japan |
| 2019 World Championship | 10–27 January 2019 | Denmark; Germany | 1 | Denmark |
| 2019 Pan American Games | 31 July – 5 August 2019 | (Peru) Lima | 1 | Argentina |
| AHF Men’s Asian qualification event | 17–26 October 2019 | (Qatar) Doha | 1 | Bahrain |
| 2020 European Championship | 10–26 January 2020 | Austria; Norway; Sweden | 1 | Spain |
| 2020 African Championship | 16–26 January 2020 | Tunisia | 1 | Egypt |
| 2020 IHF Men's Olympic Qualification Tournaments | 12–14 March 2021 | (Montenegro) Podgorica | 2 | Norway; Brazil |
| 2020 IHF Men's Olympic Qualification Tournaments | 12–14 March 2021 | (France) Montpellier | 2 | France; Portugal |
| 2020 IHF Men's Olympic Qualification Tournaments | 12–14 March 2021 | (Germany) Berlin | 2 | Sweden; Germany |
| Total | | | 12 | |

== Draw ==
The draw was held on 1 April 2021.

=== Seeding ===
The seeding was revealed on 14 March 2021.

| Pot 1 | Pot 2 | Pot 3 | Pot 4 | Pot 5 | Pot 6 |
|---|---|---|---|---|---|
| Denmark; Norway | France; Sweden | Germany; Portugal | Brazil; Japan | Spain; Egypt | Argentina; Bahrain |

== Referees ==
The referee pairs were announced on 21 April 2021.

Referees
| Algeria | Youcef Belkhiri; Sid Ali Hamidi |
| Argentina | María Paolantoni; Mariana García |
| Croatia | Matija Gubica; Boris Milošević |
| Czech Republic | Václav Horáček; Jiří Novotný |
| Denmark | Mads Hansen; Jesper Madsen |
| Egypt | Yasmina El-Saied; Heidy El-Saied |
| France | Charlotte Bonaventura; Julie Bonaventura |
| Germany | Robert Schulze; Tobias Tönnies |

Referees
| North Macedonia | Gjorgji Nachevski; Slave Nikolov |
| Portugal | Duarte Santos; Ricardo Fonseca |
| Russia | Viktoriia Alpaidze; Tatiana Berezkina |
| Slovenia | Bojan Lah; David Sok |
| South Korea | Koo Bon-ok; Lee Se-ok |
| Spain | Óscar Raluy; Ángel Sabroso |
| Sweden | Mirza Kurtagic; Mattias Wetterwik |
| Switzerland | Arthur Brunner; Morad Salah |

== Group stage ==
All times are local (UTC+9).

=== Group A ===
| Pos | Team | Pld | W | D | L | GF | GA | GD | Pts | Qualification |
|---|---|---|---|---|---|---|---|---|---|---|
| 1 | France | 5 | 4 | 0 | 1 | 162 | 148 | +14 | 8 (Note: France 36–31 Spain) | Quarter-finals |
| 2 | Spain | 5 | 4 | 0 | 1 | 155 | 142 | +13 | 8 | Quarter-finals |
| 3 | Germany | 5 | 3 | 0 | 2 | 146 | 131 | +15 | 6 (Note: Germany 28–23 Norway) | Quarter-finals |
| 4 | Norway | 5 | 3 | 0 | 2 | 136 | 132 | +4 | 6 | Quarter-finals |
| 5 | Brazil | 5 | 1 | 0 | 4 | 128 | 145 | −17 | 2 | |
| 6 | Argentina | 5 | 0 | 0 | 5 | 125 | 154 | −29 | 0 | |

Source: Tokyo 2020 and IHF
Rules for classification: 1) Points; 2) Head-to-head points; 3) Head-to-head goal difference; 4) Head-to-head goals scored; 5) Goal difference; 6) Goals scored; 7) Draw.
Notes:

| 24 July 2021; 09:00 | Norway | 27–24 | Brazil | Yoyogi National Gymnasium, Tokyo; Referees: Horáček, Novotný (CZE) |
| 24 July 2021; 09:00 | Sagosen 8 | (12–13) | Langaro 5 | Yoyogi National Gymnasium, Tokyo; Referees: Horáček, Novotný (CZE) |
| 24 July 2021; 09:00 | | Report | 1× (yellow card) 6× (suspension) 1× (red card) | Yoyogi National Gymnasium, Tokyo; Referees: Horáček, Novotný (CZE) |

| 24 July 2021; 11:00 | France | 33–27 | Argentina | Yoyogi National Gymnasium, Tokyo; Referees: Belkhiri, Hamidi (ALG) |
| 24 July 2021; 11:00 | Richardson 7 | (12–10) | D. Simonet 8 | Yoyogi National Gymnasium, Tokyo; Referees: Belkhiri, Hamidi (ALG) |
| 24 July 2021; 11:00 | 1× (yellow card) 5× (suspension) | Report | 1× (yellow card) 4× (suspension) | Yoyogi National Gymnasium, Tokyo; Referees: Belkhiri, Hamidi (ALG) |

| 24 July 2021; 16:15 | Germany | 27–28 | Spain | Yoyogi National Gymnasium, Tokyo; Referees: Kurtagic, Wetterwik (SWE) |
| 24 July 2021; 16:15 | Weinhold 5 | (13–12) | Figueras, Gómez 5 | Yoyogi National Gymnasium, Tokyo; Referees: Kurtagic, Wetterwik (SWE) |
| 24 July 2021; 16:15 | 2× (yellow card) 5× (suspension) | Report | 2× (yellow card) 2× (suspension) | Yoyogi National Gymnasium, Tokyo; Referees: Kurtagic, Wetterwik (SWE) |

| 26 July 2021; 09:00 | Brazil | 29–34 | France | Yoyogi National Gymnasium, Tokyo; Referees: Kurtagic, Wetterwik (SWE) |
| 26 July 2021; 09:00 | Dutra 10 | (13–16) | three players 4 | Yoyogi National Gymnasium, Tokyo; Referees: Kurtagic, Wetterwik (SWE) |
| 26 July 2021; 09:00 | 4× (suspension) 1× (red card) | Report | 2× (suspension) | Yoyogi National Gymnasium, Tokyo; Referees: Kurtagic, Wetterwik (SWE) |

| 26 July 2021; 11:00 | Argentina | 25–33 | Germany | Yoyogi National Gymnasium, Tokyo; Referees: Horáček, Novotný (CZE) |
| 26 July 2021; 11:00 | Martínez, D. Simonet 5 | (13–14) | Kastening, Schiller 7 | Yoyogi National Gymnasium, Tokyo; Referees: Horáček, Novotný (CZE) |
| 26 July 2021; 11:00 | 3× (yellow card) 4× (suspension) | Report | 2× (yellow card) 3× (suspension) 1× (red card) | Yoyogi National Gymnasium, Tokyo; Referees: Horáček, Novotný (CZE) |

| 26 July 2021; 16:15 | Spain | 28–27 | Norway | Yoyogi National Gymnasium, Tokyo; Referees: Nikolov, Nachevski (MKD) |
| 26 July 2021; 16:15 | Figueras 10 | (13–14) | Jøndal 9 | Yoyogi National Gymnasium, Tokyo; Referees: Nikolov, Nachevski (MKD) |
| 26 July 2021; 16:15 | 1× (yellow card) 5× (suspension) | Report | 2× (yellow card) 2× (suspension) | Yoyogi National Gymnasium, Tokyo; Referees: Nikolov, Nachevski (MKD) |

| 28 July 2021; 16:15 | Norway | 27–23 | Argentina | Yoyogi National Gymnasium, Tokyo; Referees: Fonseca, Santos (POR) |
| 28 July 2021; 16:15 | Sagosen 7 | (13–12) | Pizarro, D. Simonet 5 | Yoyogi National Gymnasium, Tokyo; Referees: Fonseca, Santos (POR) |
| 28 July 2021; 16:15 | 2× (yellow card) 4× (suspension) | Report | 2× (yellow card) 7× (suspension) | Yoyogi National Gymnasium, Tokyo; Referees: Fonseca, Santos (POR) |

| 28 July 2021; 19:30 | Brazil | 25–32 | Spain | Yoyogi National Gymnasium, Tokyo; Referees: Hansen, Madsen (DEN) |
| 28 July 2021; 19:30 | Silva 6 | (16–18) | Solé 5 | Yoyogi National Gymnasium, Tokyo; Referees: Hansen, Madsen (DEN) |
| 28 July 2021; 19:30 | 4× (suspension) | Report | 1× (yellow card) 1× (suspension) | Yoyogi National Gymnasium, Tokyo; Referees: Hansen, Madsen (DEN) |

| 28 July 2021; 21:30 | France | 30–29 | Germany | Yoyogi National Gymnasium, Tokyo; Referees: Nachevski, Nikolov (MKD) |
| 28 July 2021; 21:30 | Mem 6 | (16–13) | Kastening 7 | Yoyogi National Gymnasium, Tokyo; Referees: Nachevski, Nikolov (MKD) |
| 28 July 2021; 21:30 | 1× (yellow card) | Report | 1× (yellow card) 1× (suspension) | Yoyogi National Gymnasium, Tokyo; Referees: Nachevski, Nikolov (MKD) |

| 30 July 2021; 09:00 | Argentina | 23–25 | Brazil | Yoyogi National Gymnasium, Tokyo; Referees: Lah, Sok (SLO) |
| 30 July 2021; 09:00 | Martínez 6 | (7–14) | Silva 7 | Yoyogi National Gymnasium, Tokyo; Referees: Lah, Sok (SLO) |
| 30 July 2021; 09:00 | 2× (yellow card) 4× (suspension) 1× (red card) | Report | 1× (yellow card) 5× (suspension) 1× (red card) | Yoyogi National Gymnasium, Tokyo; Referees: Lah, Sok (SLO) |

| 30 July 2021; 14:15 | France | 36–31 | Spain | Yoyogi National Gymnasium, Tokyo; Referees: Horáček, Novotný (CZE) |
| 30 July 2021; 14:15 | Remili 9 | (18–12) | Dujshebaev, Gómez 5 | Yoyogi National Gymnasium, Tokyo; Referees: Horáček, Novotný (CZE) |
| 30 July 2021; 14:15 | 2× (yellow card) 3× (suspension) | Report | 1× (yellow card) 2× (suspension) | Yoyogi National Gymnasium, Tokyo; Referees: Horáček, Novotný (CZE) |

| 30 July 2021; 21:30 | Germany | 28–23 | Norway | Yoyogi National Gymnasium, Tokyo; Referees: Brunner, Salah (SUI) |
| 30 July 2021; 21:30 | Gensheimer 6 | (14–11) | Sagosen 7 | Yoyogi National Gymnasium, Tokyo; Referees: Brunner, Salah (SUI) |
| 30 July 2021; 21:30 | 2× (yellow card) 3× (suspension) | Report | 1× (yellow card) 6× (suspension) 1× (red card) | Yoyogi National Gymnasium, Tokyo; Referees: Brunner, Salah (SUI) |

| 1 August 2021; 14:15 | Spain | 36–27 | Argentina | Yoyogi National Gymnasium, Tokyo; Referees: Kurtagic, Wetterwik (SWE) |
| 1 August 2021; 14:15 | Gómez 6 | (17–12) | Pizarro 5 | Yoyogi National Gymnasium, Tokyo; Referees: Kurtagic, Wetterwik (SWE) |
| 1 August 2021; 14:15 | 3× (suspension) | Report | 3× (suspension) | Yoyogi National Gymnasium, Tokyo; Referees: Kurtagic, Wetterwik (SWE) |

| 1 August 2021; 16:15 | Norway | 32–29 | France | Yoyogi National Gymnasium, Tokyo; Referees: Nachevski, Nikolov (MKD) |
| 1 August 2021; 16:15 | Sagosen 7 | (15–15) | Descat, N. Karabatić 5 | Yoyogi National Gymnasium, Tokyo; Referees: Nachevski, Nikolov (MKD) |
| 1 August 2021; 16:15 | 1× (yellow card) 1× (suspension) | Report | 1× (yellow card) 3× (suspension) | Yoyogi National Gymnasium, Tokyo; Referees: Nachevski, Nikolov (MKD) |

| 1 August 2021; 19:30 | Germany | 29–25 | Brazil | Yoyogi National Gymnasium, Tokyo; Referees: Horáček, Novotný (CZE) |
| 1 August 2021; 19:30 | Knorr, Weinhold 6 | (16–12) | Dutra 7 | Yoyogi National Gymnasium, Tokyo; Referees: Horáček, Novotný (CZE) |
| 1 August 2021; 19:30 | 1× (yellow card) 3× (suspension) | Report | 2× (yellow card) 2× (suspension) | Yoyogi National Gymnasium, Tokyo; Referees: Horáček, Novotný (CZE) |

=== Group B ===
| Pos | Team | Pld | W | D | L | GF | GA | GD | Pts | Qualification |
|---|---|---|---|---|---|---|---|---|---|---|
| 1 | Denmark | 5 | 4 | 0 | 1 | 174 | 139 | +35 | 8 (Note: Denmark 2 Pts, +2 GD; Egypt 2 Pts, 0 GD, Sweden 2 Pts, −2 GD) | Quarter-finals |
| 2 | Egypt | 5 | 4 | 0 | 1 | 154 | 134 | +20 | 8 | Quarter-finals |
| 3 | Sweden | 5 | 4 | 0 | 1 | 144 | 142 | +2 | 8 | Quarter-finals |
| 4 | Bahrain | 5 | 1 | 0 | 4 | 129 | 149 | −20 | 2 (Note: Bahrain 2 Pts, +1 GD; Portugal 2 Pts, 0 GD, Japan 2 Pts, −1 GD) | Quarter-finals |
| 5 | Portugal | 5 | 1 | 0 | 4 | 143 | 156 | −13 | 2 | |
| 6 | Japan (H) | 5 | 1 | 0 | 4 | 146 | 170 | −24 | 2 | |

Source: Tokyo 2020 and IHF
Rules for classification: 1) Points; 2) Head-to-head points; 3) Head-to-head goal difference; 4) Head-to-head goals scored; 5) Goal difference; 6) Goals scored; 7) Draw.
(H) Hosts
Notes:

| 24 July 2021; 14:15 | Sweden | 32–31 | Bahrain | Yoyogi National Gymnasium, Tokyo; Referees: Brunner, Salah (SUI) |
| 24 July 2021; 14:15 | Wanne 13 | (16–18) | Habib 6 | Yoyogi National Gymnasium, Tokyo; Referees: Brunner, Salah (SUI) |
| 24 July 2021; 14:15 | 1× (yellow card) 3× (suspension) | Report | 1× (yellow card) 5× (suspension) | Yoyogi National Gymnasium, Tokyo; Referees: Brunner, Salah (SUI) |

| 24 July 2021; 19:30 | Portugal | 31–37 | Egypt | Yoyogi National Gymnasium, Tokyo; Referees: Nikolov, Nachevski (MKD) |
| 24 July 2021; 19:30 | Ferraz 6 | (15–15) | Hesham 7 | Yoyogi National Gymnasium, Tokyo; Referees: Nikolov, Nachevski (MKD) |
| 24 July 2021; 19:30 | 2× (yellow card) 5× (suspension) | Report | 1× (yellow card) 2× (suspension) | Yoyogi National Gymnasium, Tokyo; Referees: Nikolov, Nachevski (MKD) |

| 24 July 2021; 21:30 | Denmark | 47–30 | Japan | Yoyogi National Gymnasium, Tokyo; Referees: Schulze, Tönnies (GER) |
| 24 July 2021; 21:30 | Holm, Saugstrup 9 | (25–14) | Motoki 8 | Yoyogi National Gymnasium, Tokyo; Referees: Schulze, Tönnies (GER) |
| 24 July 2021; 21:30 | 1× (yellow card) 1× (suspension) | Report | 1× (yellow card) 4× (suspension) | Yoyogi National Gymnasium, Tokyo; Referees: Schulze, Tönnies (GER) |

| 26 July 2021; 14:15 | Egypt | 27–32 | Denmark | Yoyogi National Gymnasium, Tokyo; Referees: Raluy, Sabroso (ESP) |
| 26 July 2021; 14:15 | Hesham 6 | (15–14) | M. Hansen 9 | Yoyogi National Gymnasium, Tokyo; Referees: Raluy, Sabroso (ESP) |
| 26 July 2021; 14:15 | 5× (suspension) | Report | 2× (yellow card) 5× (suspension) | Yoyogi National Gymnasium, Tokyo; Referees: Raluy, Sabroso (ESP) |

| 26 July 2021; 19:30 | Bahrain | 25–26 | Portugal | Yoyogi National Gymnasium, Tokyo; Referees: Schulze, Tönnies (GER) |
| 26 July 2021; 19:30 | Habib 8 | (15–14) | Portela 6 | Yoyogi National Gymnasium, Tokyo; Referees: Schulze, Tönnies (GER) |
| 26 July 2021; 19:30 | 1× (yellow card) 4× (suspension) | Report | 1× (yellow card) 5× (suspension) | Yoyogi National Gymnasium, Tokyo; Referees: Schulze, Tönnies (GER) |

| 26 July 2021; 21:30 | Japan | 26–28 | Sweden | Yoyogi National Gymnasium, Tokyo; Referees: Lah, Sok (SLO) |
| 26 July 2021; 21:30 | Motoki 6 | (14–17) | Wanne 8 | Yoyogi National Gymnasium, Tokyo; Referees: Lah, Sok (SLO) |
| 26 July 2021; 21:30 | 1× (yellow card) 4× (suspension) | Report | 1× (yellow card) 1× (suspension) | Yoyogi National Gymnasium, Tokyo; Referees: Lah, Sok (SLO) |

| 28 July 2021; 09:00 | Denmark | 31–21 | Bahrain | Yoyogi National Gymnasium, Tokyo; Referees: Horáček, Novotný (CZE) |
| 28 July 2021; 09:00 | J. Hansen 6 | (12–7) | four players 3 | Yoyogi National Gymnasium, Tokyo; Referees: Horáček, Novotný (CZE) |
| 28 July 2021; 09:00 | 1× (suspension) | Report | 3× (yellow card) 3× (suspension) | Yoyogi National Gymnasium, Tokyo; Referees: Horáček, Novotný (CZE) |

| 28 July 2021; 11:00 | Sweden | 29–28 | Portugal | Yoyogi National Gymnasium, Tokyo; Referees: Raluy, Sabroso (ESP) |
| 28 July 2021; 11:00 | Ekberg 9 | (14–14) | three players 4 | Yoyogi National Gymnasium, Tokyo; Referees: Raluy, Sabroso (ESP) |
| 28 July 2021; 11:00 | 1× (yellow card) 2× (suspension) | Report | 1× (yellow card) 6× (suspension) | Yoyogi National Gymnasium, Tokyo; Referees: Raluy, Sabroso (ESP) |

| 28 July 2021; 14:15 | Japan | 29–33 | Egypt | Yoyogi National Gymnasium, Tokyo; Referees: Schulze, Tönnies (GER) |
| 28 July 2021; 14:15 | Tokuda 8 | (11–18) | El-Ahmar 8 | Yoyogi National Gymnasium, Tokyo; Referees: Schulze, Tönnies (GER) |
| 28 July 2021; 14:15 | 1× (yellow card) 7× (suspension) | Report | 2× (suspension) | Yoyogi National Gymnasium, Tokyo; Referees: Schulze, Tönnies (GER) |

| 30 July 2021; 11:00 | Bahrain | 32–30 | Japan | Yoyogi National Gymnasium, Tokyo; Referees: Raluy, Sabroso (ESP) |
| 30 July 2021; 11:00 | Al-Sayyad, Habib 7 | (17–16) | Motoki 7 | Yoyogi National Gymnasium, Tokyo; Referees: Raluy, Sabroso (ESP) |
| 30 July 2021; 11:00 | 2× (yellow card) 4× (suspension) | Report | 4× (suspension) | Yoyogi National Gymnasium, Tokyo; Referees: Raluy, Sabroso (ESP) |

| 30 July 2021; 16:15 | Sweden | 22–27 | Egypt | Yoyogi National Gymnasium, Tokyo; Referees: Bonaventura, Bonaventura (FRA) |
| 30 July 2021; 16:15 | Pellas 7 | (9–13) | Sanad 6 | Yoyogi National Gymnasium, Tokyo; Referees: Bonaventura, Bonaventura (FRA) |
| 30 July 2021; 16:15 | 2× (yellow card) 2× (suspension) | Report | 2× (suspension) | Yoyogi National Gymnasium, Tokyo; Referees: Bonaventura, Bonaventura (FRA) |

| 30 July 2021; 19:30 | Portugal | 28–34 | Denmark | Yoyogi National Gymnasium, Tokyo; Referees: Nachevski, Nikolov (MKD) |
| 30 July 2021; 19:30 | Branquinho 4 | (19–20) | M. Hansen 9 | Yoyogi National Gymnasium, Tokyo; Referees: Nachevski, Nikolov (MKD) |
| 30 July 2021; 19:30 | 1× (yellow card) 4× (suspension) | Report | 3× (suspension) | Yoyogi National Gymnasium, Tokyo; Referees: Nachevski, Nikolov (MKD) |

| 1 August 2021; 09:00 | Portugal | 30–31 | Japan | Yoyogi National Gymnasium, Tokyo; Referees: Brunner, Salah (SUI) |
| 1 August 2021; 09:00 | four players 4 | (14–16) | R. Tokuda 6 | Yoyogi National Gymnasium, Tokyo; Referees: Brunner, Salah (SUI) |
| 1 August 2021; 09:00 | 2× (yellow card) 4× (suspension) | Report | 2× (yellow card) 2× (suspension) | Yoyogi National Gymnasium, Tokyo; Referees: Brunner, Salah (SUI) |

| 1 August 2021; 11:00 | Egypt | 30–20 | Bahrain | Yoyogi National Gymnasium, Tokyo; Referees: Raluy, Sabroso (ESP) |
| 1 August 2021; 11:00 | El-Ahmar 5 | (15–7) | Habib 4 | Yoyogi National Gymnasium, Tokyo; Referees: Raluy, Sabroso (ESP) |
| 1 August 2021; 11:00 | 2× (yellow card) 2× (suspension) | Report | 1× (yellow card) 1× (suspension) | Yoyogi National Gymnasium, Tokyo; Referees: Raluy, Sabroso (ESP) |

| 1 August 2021; 21:30 | Denmark | 30–33 | Sweden | Yoyogi National Gymnasium, Tokyo; Referees: Schulze, Tönnies (GER) |
| 1 August 2021; 21:30 | Gidsel, J. Hansen 5 | (13–17) | Carlsbogård, Sandell 6 | Yoyogi National Gymnasium, Tokyo; Referees: Schulze, Tönnies (GER) |
| 1 August 2021; 21:30 | 3× (yellow card) 2× (suspension) | Report | 2× (yellow card) 6× (suspension) | Yoyogi National Gymnasium, Tokyo; Referees: Schulze, Tönnies (GER) |

== Knockout stage ==
=== Bracket ===
Quarterfinals
3 August
France | 42
Bahrain | 28
3 August
Germany | 26
Egypt | 31
3 August
Sweden | 33
Spain | 34
3 August
Denmark | 31
Norway | 25

Semifinals
5 August
France | 27
Egypt | 23
5 August
Spain | 23
Denmark | 27

Gold medal
7 August
France | 25
Denmark | 23
Bronze medal
7 August
Spain | 33
Egypt | 31

=== Quarterfinals ===
| 3 August 2021; 09:30 | France | 42–28 | Bahrain | Yoyogi National Gymnasium, Tokyo; Referees: Lah, Sok (SLO) |
| 3 August 2021; 09:30 | Mahé 9 | (21–14) | Al-Sayyad 5 | Yoyogi National Gymnasium, Tokyo; Referees: Lah, Sok (SLO) |
| 3 August 2021; 09:30 | 3× (suspension) | Report | 2× (yellow card) 5× (suspension) | Yoyogi National Gymnasium, Tokyo; Referees: Lah, Sok (SLO) |

| 3 August 2021; 13:15 | Sweden | 33–34 | Spain | Yoyogi National Gymnasium, Tokyo; Referees: Schulze, Tönnies (GER) |
| 3 August 2021; 13:15 | Wanne 10 | (20–18) | Gómez 8 | Yoyogi National Gymnasium, Tokyo; Referees: Schulze, Tönnies (GER) |
| 3 August 2021; 13:15 | 1× (yellow card) 4× (suspension) | Report | 2× (yellow card) 3× (suspension) | Yoyogi National Gymnasium, Tokyo; Referees: Schulze, Tönnies (GER) |

| 3 August 2021; 17:00 | Denmark | 31–25 | Norway | Yoyogi National Gymnasium, Tokyo; Referees: Bonaventura, Bonaventura (FRA) |
| 3 August 2021; 17:00 | M. Hansen, Holm 8 | (13–12) | Sagosen 8 | Yoyogi National Gymnasium, Tokyo; Referees: Bonaventura, Bonaventura (FRA) |
| 3 August 2021; 17:00 | 1× (yellow card) 4× (suspension) | Report | 1× (yellow card) 3× (suspension) 1× (red card) | Yoyogi National Gymnasium, Tokyo; Referees: Bonaventura, Bonaventura (FRA) |

| 3 August 2021; 20:45 | Germany | 26–31 | Egypt | Yoyogi National Gymnasium, Tokyo; Referees: Nikolov, Nachevski (MKD) |
| 3 August 2021; 20:45 | Golla, Kühn 6 | (12–16) | Omar, Zein 5 | Yoyogi National Gymnasium, Tokyo; Referees: Nikolov, Nachevski (MKD) |
| 3 August 2021; 20:45 | 1× (yellow card) 3× (suspension) | Report | 1× (yellow card) 1× (suspension) | Yoyogi National Gymnasium, Tokyo; Referees: Nikolov, Nachevski (MKD) |

=== Semifinals ===
| 5 August 2021; 17:00 | France | 27–23 | Egypt | Yoyogi National Gymnasium, Tokyo; Referees: Raluy, Sabroso (ESP) |
| 5 August 2021; 17:00 | Descat, Mem 5 | (13–13) | El-Ahmar, Omar 5 | Yoyogi National Gymnasium, Tokyo; Referees: Raluy, Sabroso (ESP) |
| 5 August 2021; 17:00 | 3× (yellow card) 3× (suspension) | Report | 1× (yellow card) 1× (suspension) | Yoyogi National Gymnasium, Tokyo; Referees: Raluy, Sabroso (ESP) |

| 5 August 2021; 21:00 | Spain | 23–27 | Denmark | Yoyogi National Gymnasium, Tokyo; Referees: Brunner, Salah (SUI) |
| 5 August 2021; 21:00 | Dujshebaev, Figueras 5 | (10–14) | M. Hansen 12 | Yoyogi National Gymnasium, Tokyo; Referees: Brunner, Salah (SUI) |
| 5 August 2021; 21:00 | 1× (yellow card) 4× (suspension) | Report | 2× (suspension) | Yoyogi National Gymnasium, Tokyo; Referees: Brunner, Salah (SUI) |

=== Bronze medal game ===
| 7 August 2021; 17:00 | Egypt | 31–33 | Spain | Yoyogi National Gymnasium, Tokyo; Referees: Schulze, Tönnies (GER) |
| 7 August 2021; 17:00 | El-Ahmar, Shebib 7 | (16–19) | Gómez 8 | Yoyogi National Gymnasium, Tokyo; Referees: Schulze, Tönnies (GER) |
| 7 August 2021; 17:00 | 2× (suspension) | Report | 2× (yellow card) 4× (suspension) 1× (red card) | Yoyogi National Gymnasium, Tokyo; Referees: Schulze, Tönnies (GER) |

=== Gold medal game ===
| 7 August 2021; 21:00 | France | 25–23 | Denmark | Yoyogi National Gymnasium, Tokyo; Referees: Nikolov, Nachevski (MKD) |
| 7 August 2021; 21:00 | Remili 5 | (14–10) | M. Hansen 9 | Yoyogi National Gymnasium, Tokyo; Referees: Nikolov, Nachevski (MKD) |
| 7 August 2021; 21:00 | 4× (suspension) | Report | 1× (yellow card) 1× (suspension) | Yoyogi National Gymnasium, Tokyo; Referees: Nikolov, Nachevski (MKD) |

== Ranking and statistics ==
=== Final ranking ===
| Rank | Team |
|---|---|
| Gold medal | France |
| Silver medal | Denmark |
| Bronze medal | Spain |
| 4 | Egypt |
| 5 | Sweden |
| 6 | Germany |
| 7 | Norway |
| 8 | Bahrain |
| 9 | Portugal |
| 10 | Brazil |
| 11 | Japan |
| 12 | Argentina |

=== All Star Team ===
The all-star team was announced on 7 August 2021.

| Position | Player |
|---|---|
| Goalkeeper | (France) Vincent Gérard |
| Right wing | (Spain) Aleix Gómez |
| Right back | (Egypt) Yahia Omar |
| Centre back | (France) Nedim Remili |
| Left back | (Denmark) Mikkel Hansen |
| Left wing | (France) Hugo Descat |
| Pivot | (France) Ludovic Fabregas |
| MVP | (Denmark) Mathias Gidsel |

=== Top goalscorers ===
| Rank | Name | Goals | Shots | % |
|---|---|---|---|---|
| 1 | (Denmark) Mikkel Hansen | 61 | 100 | 61 |
| 2 | (Denmark) Mathias Gidsel | 46 | 57 | 81 |
| 3 | (Spain) Aleix Gómez | 44 | 47 | 94 |
| 4 | (Norway) Sander Sagosen | 43 | 82 | 52 |
| 5 | (Sweden) Hampus Wanne | 41 | 57 | 72 |
| 6 | (Egypt) Yahia Omar | 38 | 63 | 60 |
| 7 | (Spain) Adrià Figueras | 37 | 47 | 79 |
| 8 | (Egypt) Ahmed El-Ahmar | 36 | 49 | 73 |
| 9 | (France) Hugo Descat | 32 | 37 | 86 |
| 9 | (France) Nedim Remili | 32 | 52 | 62 |

Source: IHF

With his fourth goal against Portugal Mikkel Hansen became the Olympic Games topscorer of all time with 128 goals.

=== Top goalkeepers ===
| Rank | Name | % | Saves | Shots |
|---|---|---|---|---|
| 1 | (Germany) Johannes Bitter | 33.3 % | 32 | 96 |
| 2 | (Denmark) Niklas Landin Jacobsen | 32.3 % | 64 | 198 |
| 3 | (Egypt) Karim Handawy | 31.7 % | 57 | 180 |
| 4 | (France) Vincent Gérard | 31.4 % | 74 | 236 |
| 5 | (Sweden) Mikael Aggefors | 31.3 % | 25 | 80 |
| 6 | (Norway) Torbjørn Bergerud | 31.1 % | 51 | 164 |
| 7 | (Brazil) Leonardo Terçariol | 30.5 % | 39 | 128 |
| 8 | (Egypt) Mohamed El-Tayar | 30.4 % | 41 | 135 |
| 9 | (Portugal) Gustavo Capdeville | 29.4 % | 25 | 85 |
| 10 | (Denmark) Kevin Møller | 29.1 % | 28 | 96 |

Source: IHF
