= Joachim Sutton =

Danish rower (born 1995)

Personal information
- Nationality: Danish
- Born: 15 May 1995 (age 31) Denmark
- Height: 2.00 m (6 ft 7 in)
- Weight: 95 kg (209 lb)

Sport
- Country: Denmark
- Sport: Rowing
- Event: Coxless Pair
Medal record
Representing Denmark
Men's rowing
Olympic Games
Bronze medal – third place	2020 Tokyo	Coxless pair

Joachim Sutton (born 15 May 1995) is a Danish rower who competed for University of California, Berkeley and for the Denmark national team in the coxless pair. In 2021 he qualified for the 2020 Summer Olympics, and won a bronze medal in the Men's Coxless Pair.
