= Frederic Vystavel =

Danish rower

Personal information
- Nationality: Denmark
- Born: 29 August 1993 (age 32)
- Height: 1.98 m (6 ft 6 in)

Sport
- Sport: Rowing
Medal record
Men's rowing
Representing Denmark
Olympic Games
Bronze medal – third place	2020 Tokyo	Coxless pair

Frederic Vystavel (born 29 August 1993) is a Danish rower. He won a bronze medal at the 2020 Summer Olympics in the coxless pair.
