= Guillaume Turlan =

French rower (born 1996)

Personal information
- Born: 18 October 1996 (age 30) Bordeaux, France
- Height: 1.96 m (6 ft 5 in)
- Weight: 94 kg (207 lb)

Sport
- Country: France
- Sport: Rowing
- Events: Coxless pair, Coxless four
- Club: Aviron Grenoblois
Medal record
European Championships
Bronze medal – third place	2023 Bled	Coxless four
Bronze medal – third place	2024 Szeged	Coxless four

Guillaume Turlan (born 18 October 1996) is a French rower. He competed in the 2020 Summer Olympics and 2024 Summer Olympics with his twin brother Thibaud.
