= Nedim Remili =

French handball player (born 1995)

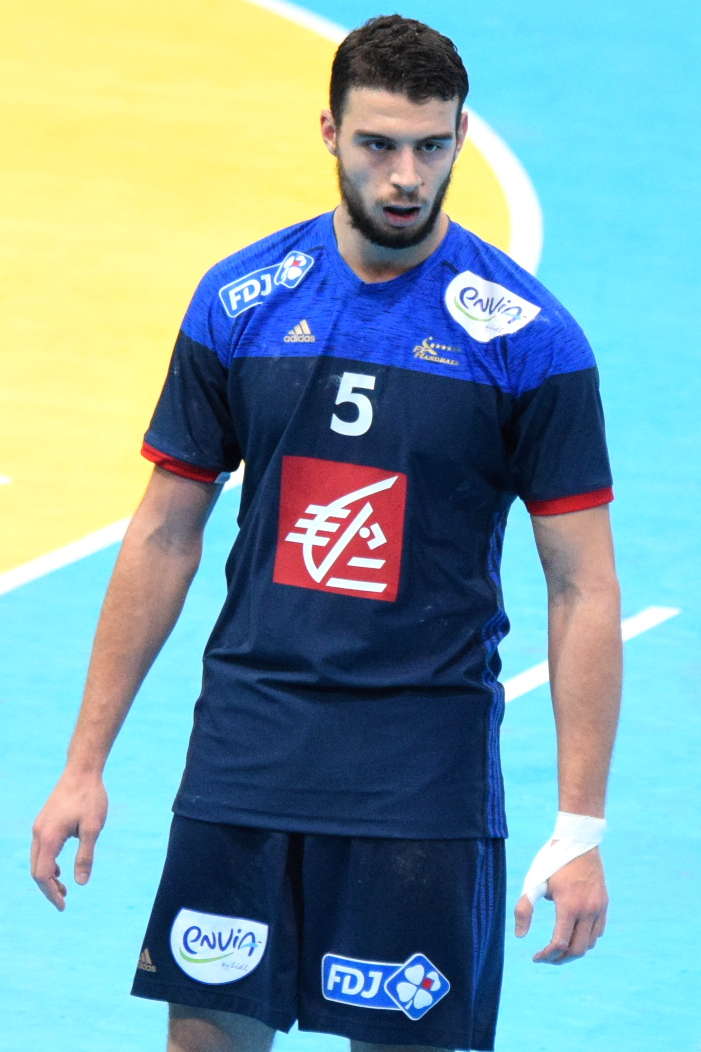
- Remili in 2016

Personal information
- Nationality: French
- Born: 18 July 1995 (age 31) Créteil, France
- Height: 1.95 m (6 ft 5 in)

Sport
- Sport: Handball
- Position: Right back/Central back
- Current club: ONE Veszprém
- Number: 29

Youth career
- Years: Team
- 2005–2013: US Créteil Handball

Senior clubs
- Years: Team
- 2013–2016: US Créteil Handball
- 2016–2022: Paris Saint-Germain
- 2022–2023: Industria Kielce
- 2023–: ONE Veszprém
National team
Years	Team	Apps	(Gls)
2016–	France	127	(389)
Medal record
Olympic Games
Gold medal – first place	2020 Tokyo	Team
World Championship
Gold medal – first place	2017 France
Silver medal – second place	2023 Poland/Sweden
Bronze medal – third place	2019 Germany/Denmark
Bronze medal – third place	2025 Croatia/Denmark/Norway
European Championship
Gold medal – first place	2024 Germany
Bronze medal – third place	2018 Croatia
- Updated on 5 July 2025

Nedim Remili (born 18 July 1995) is a French handball player for ONE Veszprém and the France national team.

== Biography ==
=== Early life ===
Remili was born in Créteil, a commune in southeastern suburbs of Paris. His father, Kamel Remili, played his entire career for US Créteil and won the LNH 1 with them in 1989. His brother Meyane played for SO Romorantin and US Créteil-Lusitanos.

=== US Créteil ===
When Nedim turned 10, he began playing handball in his fathers club, US Créteil, where his father works as a board member. Remili showed a lot of qualities while in the academy of US Créteil and reached a height of 1.95 meter at the age of 16. Remili made his debut for the first team of US Créteil on 12 October 2012, at the age of 17, during a league game against USDK Dunkerque. During the same year, Créteil were relegated to the Handball D2, the second-tier league of France. Despite interest from some of the biggest clubs in French handball, Remili signed his first professional contract in 2013 with US Créteil.

The following season (2013–14), in the Handball D2, Remili became a key player in the squad of US Créteil, and helped them to return to the LNH 1. Remili was called up to the national France youth team for the 2015 Men's Junior World Championship, but a shoulder injury forced him to watch the championship at home, as France became world champions.

=== First National team call up ===
During the 2015–16 season, Remili performed for US Créteil, which earned him a call-up to the All-Star Game and to the France national team for the 2016 European Championship.

In 2016 he joined Paris Saint-Germain Handball, where he won his first trophy: the Trophée des Champions in his first season. Later the same season he also won the French Championship.

He then repeated his impressive performances and was selected for the French national team for the 2017 World Men's Handball Championship. Playing on home soil, the French team won the title, as Remili was voted best right-back of the competition.

=== KS Kielce ===
In June 2021, Polish club KS Kielce officially signed him on a four-year deal, joining alongside former teammate Benoît Kounkoud in the 2022 off-season.

He then competed in his first Olympic Games, postponed by a year due to the COVID-19 pandemic. There, his versatility enabled Guillaume Gille to place him in the centre-half position for the tournament, which France ended up winning. Individually Remili was voted best centre-half of the Olympics.

=== Veszprém ===
As Kielce had financial difficulties in 2023, Remili joined Telekom Veszprém in February 2023. Here he won the Hungarian championship in both 2023 and 2024 and the Hungarian Cup in 2024.

At the 2025 World Championship, he won bronze medals with France, losing to Croatia in the semifinal and beating Portugal in the third place playoff. He played all 9 games for France and scored 34 goals.

He missed the 2026 European Men's Handball Championship due to an injury.

== Individual awards ==
- Most Valuable Player (MVP) of the European Championship: 2024
- All-Star Right back of the World Championship: 2017
- All-Star Centre back of the World Championship: 2023
- All-Star Centre back of the Olympic games: 2020
- MVP of the Club world championship: 2024
