= Randers HH =

Danish handball club

- Full name: Randers Herre Håndbold
- Founded: 2006; 20 years ago
- Arena: Arena Randers, Randers
- Capacity: 3000, 2160 seats
- Sports director, Chairperson: Andreas Svoldgaard, Carsten Reinholdt Andersen
- Club colours
Home	Away

Location of Randers HH

Randers Herre Håndbold, also known as Randers HH, is a Danish men's handball team from Randers, Denmark.

The team declared bankruptcy in May 2020. The following summer the youth teams was continued, and since then the club has only had U-19 and U-17 teams.

== History ==
The club was founded in 2006 as a cooperation of local teams in and around Randers, with the purpose to create an elite level men's team. On the women's side Randers HK had already had success, but there was not a major team on the men's side, since 2002. The founding clubs where Dronningborg Boldklub, Randers Freja, Hornbæk SF, Randers KFUM, Vorup FB and Kristrup Boldklub.

The team were promoted to the Herrehåndboldligaen, the top league in Danish handball, in 2015-16. Only a year later, in the 2016-17 season, they were relegated again.
