= Mikael Aggefors =

Swedish handball player (born 1985)

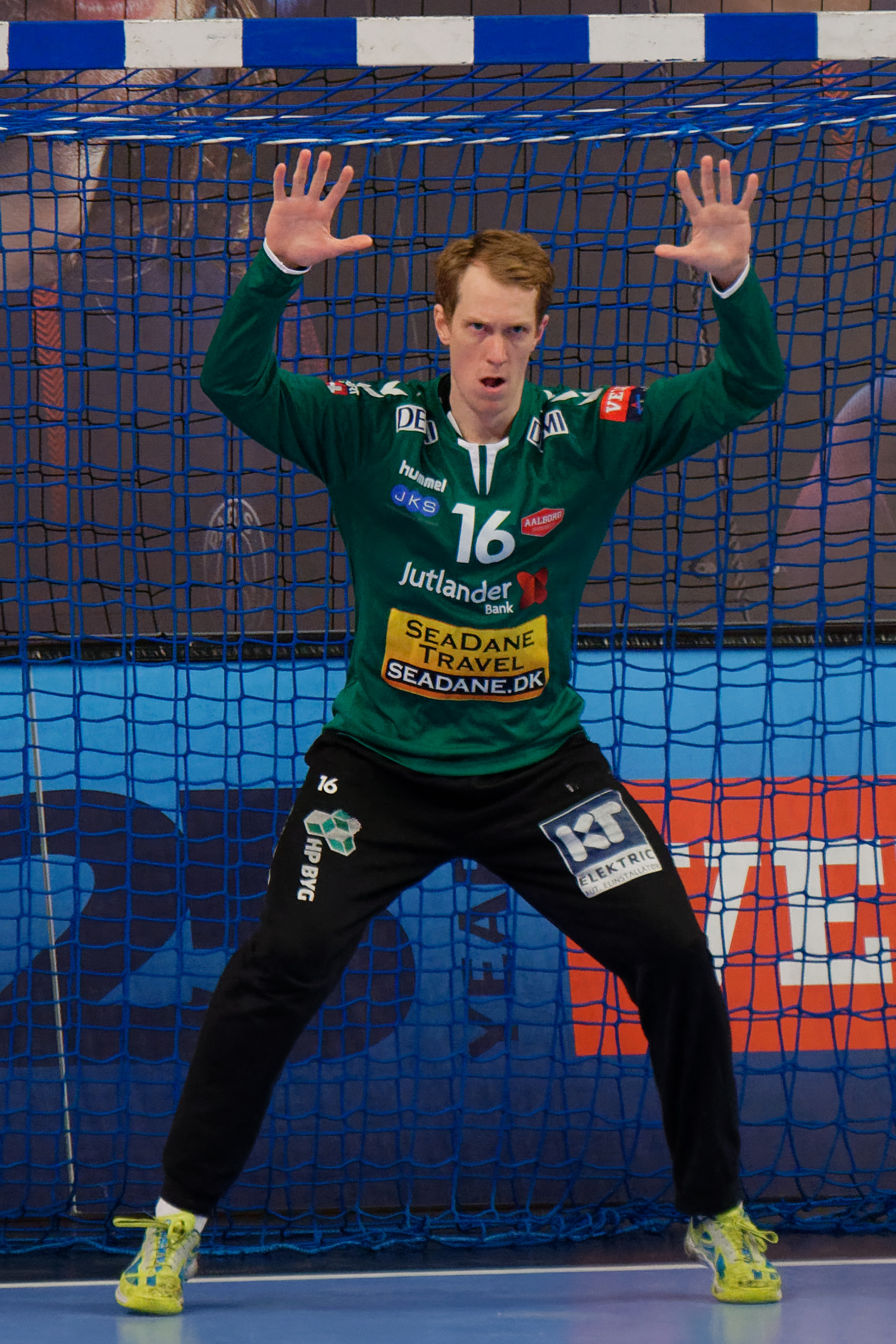
- Aggefors in 2017

Personal information
- Nationality: Swedish
- Born: 20 January 1985 (age 41) Stockholm, Sweden
- Height: 1.91 m (6 ft 3 in)

Sport
- Sport: Handball
- Position: Goalkeeper

Senior clubs
- Years: Team
- 2009–2016: Alingsås HK
- 2016–2023: Aalborg Håndbold
- 04-06/2024: SC Magdeburg
National team
Years	Team	Apps	(Gls)
2013–2023	Sweden	41	(0)

Teams managed
- 2023-: Alingsås HK (GK Coach)
Medal record
World Championship
Silver medal – second place	2021 Egypt

Mikael Nils Aggefors (born 20 January 1985) is a Swedish retired handball player. He is currently working as a goalkeeping coach at the Swedish club Alingsås HK.

== Achievements ==
- EHF Champions League
  - Runner-up: 2021
- Handball-Bundesliga
  - Winner: 2024
- Danish Handball League
  - Winner: 2017, 2019, 2020, 2021
  - Runner-up: 2022, 2023
- Danish Cup
  - Winner: 2018, 2021
  - Runner-up: 2020
- Danish Super Cup
  - Winner: 2019, 2020, 2021, 2022
- DHB-Pokal
  - Winner: 2024
- IHF Super Globe
  - Bronze medal: 2021
- Handbollsligan
  - Winner: 2014

Individual awards

- MVP (Danish: Pokalfighter) in the Danish Cup 2018
