= Anna Nielsen (sport shooter) =

Danish sports shooter (born 1998)

Personal information
- Nationality: Danish
- Born: 23 April 1998 (age 26)

Sport
- Sport: Sports shooting

Anna Nielsen (born 23 April 1998) is a Danish sports shooter. She competed in the women's 10 metre air rifle event at the 2020 Summer Olympics.
