= Jacob Holm (handballer) =

Danish handball player (born 1995)

Personal information
- Full name: Jacob Tandrup Holm
- Nationality: Danish
- Born: 5 September 1995 (age 31) Esbjerg, Denmark
- Height: 1.94 m (6 ft 4 in)

Sport
- Sport: Handball
- Position: Center back
- Current club: Paris Saint-Germain
- Number: 32

Youth career
- Years: Team
- –2013: Skjern Håndbold

Senior clubs
- Years: Team
- 2013–2018: Ribe-Esbjerg HH
- 2018–2023: Füchse Berlin
- 2023–: Paris Saint-Germain
National team
Years	Team	Apps	(Gls)
2016–	Denmark	89	(220)
Medal record
Olympic Games
Silver medal – second place	2020 Tokyo	Team
World Championship
Gold medal – first place	2021 Egypt
Gold medal – first place	2023 Poland/Sweden
European Championship
Bronze medal – third place	2022 Hungary/Slovakia
- Updated on 9 July 2025

Jacob Tandrup Holm (born 5 September 1995) is a Danish handball player who plays for Paris Saint-Germain and the national team. He is a world champion from the 2021 World Championship.

He also represented Denmark at the 2020 European Men's Handball Championship. He debuted for the national team in 2016 in a match against the Feroe Islands.

== Club career ==
He started playing handball at the age of 7 at Esbjerg Håndbold. At the age of 17 he played his first senior match for Ribe-Esbjerg HH. In 2018 he switched to German side Füchse Berlin, where he played for 5 years. Here he won the 2022–23 EHF European League with the club.

At the beginning of the 2023/24 season, he signed with French top club Paris Saint-Germain Handball. Here he won the French championship in 2024 and 2025. From the 26–27 season he will return to Denmark and join Skjern Håndbold.

== Titles ==
- EHF European League: 2023
- French Championship: 2024, 2025, 2026
