= 2012–13 EHF Cup group stage =

This article describes the group stage of the 2012–13 EHF Cup.

== Format ==
Location of teams of the 2012–13 EHF Cup group stage.
Red: Group A; Green: Group B; Blue: Group C; Yellow: Group D.

The 16 teams were split into four groups, consisting of four teams. Each team played a home and away game against all opponents in the group. The first and the second ranked teams advanced to the knockout stage.

The draw of the EHF Cup group phase was carried out on Thursday 6 December 2012 in Belgrade, Serbia. The teams were positioned into four pots, with the country protection rule applied: two clubs from the same country may not face each other in the same group. As is standard in EHF club competitions, the seeding is calculated on the basis of the three most recent seasons. Consequently, the results of the seasons 2011–12, 2010–11 and 2009–10 was considered to determine the seeding of the teams for the 2012–13 season. As there was the EHF Cup as well as the EHF Cup Winners' Cup parallel in these last three seasons, the results of both competitions of these seasons were added and then divided by two in order to get the points for the seeding for the 2012–13 season.

The group stage features 16 teams, which were allocated four groups of four. In each group, teams play against each other home-and-away in a round-robin format. The matchdays are 9–10 February, 16–17 February, 23–24 February, 9–10 March, 16–17 March, and 23–24 March 2013. The top two teams from each group qualify for the quarter-finals, which are scheduled in April 2013.

If Nantes, as the organiser of the Final 4 tournament, win their group or finish among top three second ranked teams, they will receive a direct qualification to the Final 4 tournament. In that case only four group winners and two best second ranked team will qualify for the quarter-finals. If Nantes finish as the worst second ranked team, they will have to play the quarter-final match. Should the French club rank on the third or fourth position in their group, they will be out of the competition, but they will still organize the Final 4 tournament.

If two or more teams are equal on points on completion of the group matches, the following criteria are applied to determine the rankings (in descending order):

1. number of points in matches of all teams directly involved;
2. goal difference in matches of all teams directly involved;
3. greater number of plus goals in matches of all teams directly involved;
4. goal difference in all matches of the group;
5. greater number of plus goals in all matches of the group;

If no ranking can be determined, a decision shall be obtained by drawing lots. Lots shall be drawn by the EHF, if possible in the presence of a responsible of each club.

Pot 1 (Germany) Frisch Auf Göppingen (Norway) Elverum (Turkey) Beşiktaş (Slovakia) Tatran Prešov	Pot 2 (Denmark) Tvis Holstebro (Slovenia) Cimos Koper (Ukraine) Motor Zaporizhzhia (Romania) SMD Bacău	Pot 3 (Poland) Wisła Płock (Germany) Rhein-Neckar Löwen (Sweden) Eskilstuna Guif (Germany) Magdeburg	Pot 4 (Spain) La Rioja (France) Nantes (Denmark) KIF Kolding (Slovenia) Maribor Branik

== Groups ==
Key to colours in group tables
Teams that has qualified to the next phase of the competition

=== Group A ===
Team	Pld	W	D	L	GF	GA	GD	Pts
(Germany) Frisch Auf Göppingen	6	5	0	1	200	175	+25	10
(Spain) La Rioja	6	4	0	2	171	155	+16	8
(Slovenia) Koper	6	3	0	3	181	189	−8	6
(Sweden) Eskilstuna Guif	6	0	0	6	154	187	−33	0

9 February 2013; 19:00	Cimos Koper (Slovenia)	25–21	(Spain) La Rioja	Bonifika Hall, Koper; Attendance: 1,500; Referees: Yudchyts, Kot (BLR)
9 February 2013; 19:00	Rapotec 5	(13–11)	Paván 6	Bonifika Hall, Koper; Attendance: 1,500; Referees: Yudchyts, Kot (BLR)
9 February 2013; 19:00	3× (yellow card) 3× (suspension)	Report	3× (yellow card) 1× (suspension)	Bonifika Hall, Koper; Attendance: 1,500; Referees: Yudchyts, Kot (BLR)

9 February 2013; 19:30	Frisch Auf Göppingen (Germany)	37–26	(Sweden) Eskilstuna Guif	EWS Arena, Göppingen; Attendance: 2,900; Referees: Konjicanin, Konjicanin (BIH)
9 February 2013; 19:30	Marković 8	(20–16)	Tholin 6	EWS Arena, Göppingen; Attendance: 2,900; Referees: Konjicanin, Konjicanin (BIH)
9 February 2013; 19:30	3× (yellow card) 2× (suspension)	Report	3× (yellow card) 2× (suspension)	EWS Arena, Göppingen; Attendance: 2,900; Referees: Konjicanin, Konjicanin (BIH)

16 February 2013; 16:00	Eskilstuna Guif (Sweden)	29–30	(Slovenia) Cimos Koper	Sporthall, Eskilstuna; Attendance: 1,241; Referees: Andorka, Hucker (HUN)
16 February 2013; 16:00	Tholin 9	(15–14)	Brumen, Rapotec 8	Sporthall, Eskilstuna; Attendance: 1,241; Referees: Andorka, Hucker (HUN)
16 February 2013; 16:00	3× (yellow card) 2× (suspension) 1× (red card)	Report	2× (yellow card) 5× (suspension)	Sporthall, Eskilstuna; Attendance: 1,241; Referees: Andorka, Hucker (HUN)

16 February 2013; 20:00	La Rioja (Spain)	25–23	(Germany) Frisch Auf Göppingen	Palacio de los Deportes, Logroño; Attendance: 3,500; Referees: Togstad, Kristiansen (NOR)
16 February 2013; 20:00	Tioumentsev 6	(12–13)	Marković 7	Palacio de los Deportes, Logroño; Attendance: 3,500; Referees: Togstad, Kristiansen (NOR)
16 February 2013; 20:00	3× (yellow card) 1× (suspension)	Report	3× (yellow card) 3× (suspension)	Palacio de los Deportes, Logroño; Attendance: 3,500; Referees: Togstad, Kristiansen (NOR)

23 February 2013; 19:00	Cimos Koper (Slovenia)	36–39	(Germany) Frisch Auf Göppingen	Bonifika Hall, Koper; Attendance: 1,599; Referees: Bounouara, Sami (FRA)
23 February 2013; 19:00	Bombač 12	(14–22)	three players 7	Bonifika Hall, Koper; Attendance: 1,599; Referees: Bounouara, Sami (FRA)
23 February 2013; 19:00	3× (yellow card) 4× (suspension) 1× (red card)	Report	3× (yellow card) 5× (suspension)	Bonifika Hall, Koper; Attendance: 1,599; Referees: Bounouara, Sami (FRA)

23 February 2013; 20:00	La Rioja (Spain)	29–23	(Sweden) Eskilstuna Guif	Palacio de los Deportes, Logroño; Attendance: 3,000; Referees: Sager, Styger (SUI)
23 February 2013; 20:00	Ćuruvija 7	(17–13)	Heimisson 8	Palacio de los Deportes, Logroño; Attendance: 3,000; Referees: Sager, Styger (SUI)
23 February 2013; 20:00	3× (yellow card) 2× (suspension)	Report	3× (yellow card) 6× (suspension)	Palacio de los Deportes, Logroño; Attendance: 3,000; Referees: Sager, Styger (SUI)

9 March 2013; 16:00	Eskilstuna Guif (Sweden)	24–30	(Spain) La Rioja	Sporthall, Eskilstuna; Attendance: 1,165; Referees: Mazeika, Gatelis (LTU)
9 March 2013; 16:00	Freiman 5	(10–11)	Da Costa Capote 8	Sporthall, Eskilstuna; Attendance: 1,165; Referees: Mazeika, Gatelis (LTU)
9 March 2013; 16:00	3× (yellow card) 3× (suspension)	Report	3× (yellow card) 3× (suspension)	Sporthall, Eskilstuna; Attendance: 1,165; Referees: Mazeika, Gatelis (LTU)

9 March 2013; 19:30	Frisch Auf Göppingen (Germany)	38–32	(Slovenia) Cimos Koper	EWS Arena, Göppingen; Attendance: 3,000; Referees: Herczeg, Südi (HUN)
9 March 2013; 19:30	Späth 8	(20–15)	Rapotec 8	EWS Arena, Göppingen; Attendance: 3,000; Referees: Herczeg, Südi (HUN)
9 March 2013; 19:30	3× (yellow card) 5× (suspension)	Report	3× (yellow card) 7× (suspension) 1× (red card)	EWS Arena, Göppingen; Attendance: 3,000; Referees: Herczeg, Südi (HUN)

16 March 2013; 19:00	Eskilstuna Guif (Sweden)	25–31	(Germany) Frisch Auf Göppingen	Sporthall, Eskilstuna; Attendance: 909; Referees: Kouz, Zhoba (UKR)
16 March 2013; 19:00	Freiman, Pettersson 5	(12–17)	Marković 8	Sporthall, Eskilstuna; Attendance: 909; Referees: Kouz, Zhoba (UKR)
16 March 2013; 19:00	3× (yellow card) 2× (suspension)	Report	3× (yellow card) 1× (suspension) 1× (red card)	Sporthall, Eskilstuna; Attendance: 909; Referees: Kouz, Zhoba (UKR)

16 March 2013; 20:00	La Rioja (Spain)	35–28	(Slovenia) Cimos Koper	Palacio de los Deportes, Logroño; Attendance: 4,000; Referees: Pichon, Reveret (FRA)
16 March 2013; 20:00	Da Costa Capote 8	(19–14)	Osmajić 10	Palacio de los Deportes, Logroño; Attendance: 4,000; Referees: Pichon, Reveret (FRA)
16 March 2013; 20:00	2× (yellow card) 2× (suspension)	Report	4× (yellow card) 3× (suspension)	Palacio de los Deportes, Logroño; Attendance: 4,000; Referees: Pichon, Reveret (FRA)

23 March 2013; 19:00	Cimos Koper (Slovenia)	30–27	(Sweden) Eskilstuna Guif	Bonifika Hall, Koper; Attendance: 500; Referees: Nabokau, Kulik (BLR)
23 March 2013; 19:00	Gavranović, Osmajić 6	(16–13)	Pettersson	Bonifika Hall, Koper; Attendance: 500; Referees: Nabokau, Kulik (BLR)
23 March 2013; 19:00	2× (yellow card) 7× (suspension)	Report	3× (yellow card) 6× (suspension)	Bonifika Hall, Koper; Attendance: 500; Referees: Nabokau, Kulik (BLR)

23 March 2013; 19:30	Frisch Auf Göppingen (Germany)	32–31	(Spain) La Rioja	EWS Arena, Göppingen; Attendance: 3,600; Referees: Kaveshnikov, Plotnikov (RUS)
23 March 2013; 19:30	Rnić 9	(18–17)	Pavan Lopez 10	EWS Arena, Göppingen; Attendance: 3,600; Referees: Kaveshnikov, Plotnikov (RUS)
23 March 2013; 19:30	3× (yellow card) 1× (suspension)	Report	3× (yellow card) 4× (suspension)	EWS Arena, Göppingen; Attendance: 3,600; Referees: Kaveshnikov, Plotnikov (RUS)

=== Group B ===
Team	Pld	W	D	L	GF	GA	GD	Pts
(Germany) Rhein-Neckar Löwen	6	5	0	1	185	150	+35	10
(Denmark) KIF Kolding	6	3	0	3	158	145	+13	6
(Slovakia) Tatran Prešov	6	3	0	3	167	184	−17	6
(Ukraine) HC Motor Zaporizhzhia	6	1	0	5	150	181	−31	2

9 February 2013; 20:30	Tatran Prešov (Slovakia)	33–34	(Germany) Rhein-Neckar Löwen	City Hall, Prešov; Attendance: 3,350; Referees: Vitaku, Vitaku (Kosovo)
9 February 2013; 20:30	Krištopāns 8	(17–17)	Schmid 11	City Hall, Prešov; Attendance: 3,350; Referees: Vitaku, Vitaku (Kosovo)
9 February 2013; 20:30	3× (yellow card) 2× (suspension)	Report	3× (yellow card) 5× (suspension)	City Hall, Prešov; Attendance: 3,350; Referees: Vitaku, Vitaku (Kosovo)

9 February 2013; 17:00	Motor Zaporizhzhia (Ukraine)	21–24	(Denmark) KIF Kolding	Palace of Sports Yunost, Zaporizhzhia; Attendance: 900; Referees: Dobrovits, Tájok (HUN)
9 February 2013; 17:00	Semikov 6	(8–10)	Spellerberg 8	Palace of Sports Yunost, Zaporizhzhia; Attendance: 900; Referees: Dobrovits, Tájok (HUN)
9 February 2013; 17:00	2× (yellow card) 1× (suspension)	Report	3× (yellow card) 2× (suspension)	Palace of Sports Yunost, Zaporizhzhia; Attendance: 900; Referees: Dobrovits, Tájok (HUN)

16 February 2013; 15:00	KIF Kolding (Denmark)	37–17	(Slovakia) Tatran Prešov	Kolding Hallen, Kolding; Attendance: 2,775; Referees: Pandzić, Satordzija (BIH)
16 February 2013; 15:00	Jensen 8	(17–8)	Krištopāns 4	Kolding Hallen, Kolding; Attendance: 2,775; Referees: Pandzić, Satordzija (BIH)
16 February 2013; 15:00	3× (yellow card) 3× (suspension)	Report	3× (yellow card) 4× (suspension)	Kolding Hallen, Kolding; Attendance: 2,775; Referees: Pandzić, Satordzija (BIH)

16 February 2013; 19:00	Rhein-Neckar Löwen (Germany)	35–22	(Ukraine) Motor Zaporizhzhia	MWS Halle am Herzogenried, Mannheim; Attendance: 1,467; Referees: Pandzić, Mosorinski (SRB)
16 February 2013; 19:00	Ekdahl du Rietz, Schmid 5	(18–11)	Semikov 6	MWS Halle am Herzogenried, Mannheim; Attendance: 1,467; Referees: Pandzić, Mosorinski (SRB)
16 February 2013; 19:00	3× (yellow card) 2× (suspension)	Report	3× (yellow card) 6× (suspension)	MWS Halle am Herzogenried, Mannheim; Attendance: 1,467; Referees: Pandzić, Mosorinski (SRB)

23 February 2013; 17:00	Motor Zaporizhzhia (Ukraine)	27–32	(Slovakia) Tatran Prešov	Palace of Sports Yunost, Zaporizhzhia; Attendance: 900; Referees: Mitrevski, Todorovski (MKD)
23 February 2013; 17:00	Burka, Mirzoyev 5	(10–15)	Antl 9	Palace of Sports Yunost, Zaporizhzhia; Attendance: 900; Referees: Mitrevski, Todorovski (MKD)
23 February 2013; 17:00	3× (yellow card) 2× (suspension)	Report	3× (yellow card) 3× (suspension)	Palace of Sports Yunost, Zaporizhzhia; Attendance: 900; Referees: Mitrevski, Todorovski (MKD)

24 February 2013; 15:00	KIF Kolding (Denmark)	25–23	(Germany) Rhein-Neckar Löwen	Brøndby Hall, Brøndby; Attendance: 4,749; Referees: Nabokau, Kulik (BLR)
24 February 2013; 15:00	Boesen 6	(13–11)	Petersson 6	Brøndby Hall, Brøndby; Attendance: 4,749; Referees: Nabokau, Kulik (BLR)
24 February 2013; 15:00	3× (yellow card) 4× (suspension)	Report	3× (yellow card) 2× (suspension)	Brøndby Hall, Brøndby; Attendance: 4,749; Referees: Nabokau, Kulik (BLR)

9 March 2013; 20:30	Tatran Prešov (Slovakia)	36–28	(Ukraine) Motor Zaporizhzhia	City Hall, Prešov; Attendance: 3,120; Referees: Jurinović, Mrvica (CRO)
9 March 2013; 20:30	Antl 9	(19–17)	Burka 9	City Hall, Prešov; Attendance: 3,120; Referees: Jurinović, Mrvica (CRO)
9 March 2013; 20:30	3× (yellow card) 3× (suspension)	Report	3× (yellow card) 2× (suspension)	City Hall, Prešov; Attendance: 3,120; Referees: Jurinović, Mrvica (CRO)

10 March 2013; 17:00	Rhein-Neckar Löwen (Germany)	28–25	(Denmark) KIF Kolding	MWS Halle am Herzogenried, Mannheim; Attendance: 1,900; Referees: Bounouara, Sami (FRA)
10 March 2013; 17:00	Šešum 10	(16–10)	Jensen 6	MWS Halle am Herzogenried, Mannheim; Attendance: 1,900; Referees: Bounouara, Sami (FRA)
10 March 2013; 17:00	2× (yellow card) 3× (suspension)	Report	3× (yellow card) 3× (suspension)	MWS Halle am Herzogenried, Mannheim; Attendance: 1,900; Referees: Bounouara, Sami (FRA)

16 March 2013; 19:00	Rhein-Neckar Löwen (Germany)	36–20	(Slovakia) Tatran Prešov	MWS Halle am Herzogenried, Mannheim; Attendance: 1,732; Referees: Togstad, Kristiansen (NOR)
16 March 2013; 19:00	Schmid, Sigurmannsson 7	(21–10)	Krok 5	MWS Halle am Herzogenried, Mannheim; Attendance: 1,732; Referees: Togstad, Kristiansen (NOR)
16 March 2013; 19:00	3× (yellow card) 3× (suspension)	Report	3× (yellow card) 4× (suspension)	MWS Halle am Herzogenried, Mannheim; Attendance: 1,732; Referees: Togstad, Kristiansen (NOR)

17 March 2013; 15:00	KIF Kolding (Denmark)	25–27	(Ukraine) Motor Zaporizhzhia	Forum, Horsens; Attendance: 1,750; Referees: Bernet, Wick (SUI)
17 March 2013; 15:00	Spellerberg 9	(13–14)	Burka 13	Forum, Horsens; Attendance: 1,750; Referees: Bernet, Wick (SUI)
17 March 2013; 15:00	3× (yellow card) 3× (suspension)	Report	3× (yellow card) 3× (suspension)	Forum, Horsens; Attendance: 1,750; Referees: Bernet, Wick (SUI)

23 March 2013; 17:00	Motor Zaporizhzhia (Ukraine)	25–29	(Germany) Rhein-Neckar Löwen	Palace of Sports Yunost, Zaporizhzhia; Attendance: 900; Referees: Boričić, Marković (SRB)
23 March 2013; 17:00	Burka, Semikov 6	(12–13)	three players 5	Palace of Sports Yunost, Zaporizhzhia; Attendance: 900; Referees: Boričić, Marković (SRB)
23 March 2013; 17:00	3× (yellow card) 4× (suspension)	Report	3× (yellow card) 4× (suspension)	Palace of Sports Yunost, Zaporizhzhia; Attendance: 900; Referees: Boričić, Marković (SRB)

23 March 2013; 18:00	Tatran Prešov (Slovakia)	29–22	(Denmark) KIF Kolding	City Hall, Prešov; Attendance: 2,274; Referees: Brkić, Jusufhodžić (AUT)
23 March 2013; 18:00	Antl, Krištopāns 6	(18–13)	Karlsson 5	City Hall, Prešov; Attendance: 2,274; Referees: Brkić, Jusufhodžić (AUT)
23 March 2013; 18:00	3× (yellow card) 2× (suspension)	Report	3× (yellow card) 4× (suspension)	City Hall, Prešov; Attendance: 2,274; Referees: Brkić, Jusufhodžić (AUT)

=== Group C ===
Team	Pld	W	D	L	GF	GA	GD	Pts
(Denmark) Tvis Holstebro	6	3	2	1	170	157	+13	8
(Slovenia) Maribor Branik	6	3	1	2	170	165	+5	7
(Poland) Wisła Płock	6	3	0	3	164	158	+6	6
(Norway) Elverum	6	1	1	4	155	179	−24	3

10 February 2013; 15:00	Tvis Holstebro (Denmark)	26–26	(Slovenia) Maribor Branik	Gräkjaer Arena, Holstebro; Attendance: 1,504; Referees: Liachovicius, Gecevicius (LTU)
10 February 2013; 15:00	Larsen 8	(15–12)	Špelić 7	Gräkjaer Arena, Holstebro; Attendance: 1,504; Referees: Liachovicius, Gecevicius (LTU)
10 February 2013; 15:00	2× (yellow card) 3× (suspension)	Report	3× (yellow card) 4× (suspension)	Gräkjaer Arena, Holstebro; Attendance: 1,504; Referees: Liachovicius, Gecevicius (LTU)

10 February 2013; 18:00	Elverum (Norway)	25–27	(Poland) Wisła Płock	Terningen Arena, Elverum; Attendance: 1,209; Referees: Kékes, Kékes (HUN)
10 February 2013; 18:00	Sluijters 7	(14–10)	Ghionea 6	Terningen Arena, Elverum; Attendance: 1,209; Referees: Kékes, Kékes (HUN)
10 February 2013; 18:00	3× (yellow card) 3× (suspension)	Report	2× (yellow card) 5× (suspension)	Terningen Arena, Elverum; Attendance: 1,209; Referees: Kékes, Kékes (HUN)

16 February 2013; 19:00	Maribor Branik (Slovenia)	34–29	(Norway) Elverum	Tabor Hall, Maribor; Attendance: 1,000; Referees: Aliyev, Aghakishiyev (AZE)
16 February 2013; 19:00	Špelić 9	(19–14)	Rönnberg 6	Tabor Hall, Maribor; Attendance: 1,000; Referees: Aliyev, Aghakishiyev (AZE)
16 February 2013; 19:00	3× (yellow card) 6× (suspension)	Report	3× (yellow card) 2× (suspension)	Tabor Hall, Maribor; Attendance: 1,000; Referees: Aliyev, Aghakishiyev (AZE)

10 February 2013; 19:00	Wisła Płock (Poland)	28–29	(Denmark) Tvis Holstebro	Orlen Arena, Płock; Attendance: 3,800; Referees: Vesović, Mitrović (MNE)
10 February 2013; 19:00	Ghionea 6	(15–13)	Larsen, Nielsen 6	Orlen Arena, Płock; Attendance: 3,800; Referees: Vesović, Mitrović (MNE)
10 February 2013; 19:00	3× (yellow card) 3× (suspension)	Report	3× (yellow card) 3× (suspension)	Orlen Arena, Płock; Attendance: 3,800; Referees: Vesović, Mitrović (MNE)

24 February 2013; 18:00	Elverum (Norway)	28–28	(Denmark) Tvis Holstebro	Terningen Arena, Elverum; Attendance: 926; Referees: Frieser, Frieser (CZE)
24 February 2013; 18:00	Gullerud 8	(16–15)	Nielsen 9	Terningen Arena, Elverum; Attendance: 926; Referees: Frieser, Frieser (CZE)
24 February 2013; 18:00	3× (yellow card) 2× (suspension)	Report	3× (yellow card) 2× (suspension)	Terningen Arena, Elverum; Attendance: 926; Referees: Frieser, Frieser (CZE)

24 February 2013; 19:00	Maribor Branik (Slovenia)	26–23	(Poland) Wisła Płock	Tabor Hall, Maribor; Attendance: 1,500; Referees: Argyridis, Mouttas (CYP)
24 February 2013; 19:00	Špelić 7	(13–13)	Nenadić 7	Tabor Hall, Maribor; Attendance: 1,500; Referees: Argyridis, Mouttas (CYP)
24 February 2013; 19:00	3× (yellow card) 1× (suspension)	Report	3× (yellow card) 5× (suspension)	Tabor Hall, Maribor; Attendance: 1,500; Referees: Argyridis, Mouttas (CYP)

9 March 2013; 18:00	Wisła Płock (Poland)	30–26	(Slovenia) Maribor Branik	Orlen Arena, Płock; Attendance: 3,100; Referees: Novikov, Perepilitsy (UKR)
9 March 2013; 18:00	Kubisztal 9	(15–12)	Tarabochia 6	Orlen Arena, Płock; Attendance: 3,100; Referees: Novikov, Perepilitsy (UKR)
9 March 2013; 18:00	3× (yellow card) 5× (suspension)	Report	3× (yellow card) 4× (suspension)	Orlen Arena, Płock; Attendance: 3,100; Referees: Novikov, Perepilitsy (UKR)

10 March 2013; 15:00	Tvis Holstebro (Denmark)	33–18	(Norway) Elverum	Gräkjaer Arena, Holstebro; Attendance: 1,673; Referees: Leandersson, Lindroos (FIN)
10 March 2013; 15:00	Nielsen 8	(16–10)	Lindboe 6	Gräkjaer Arena, Holstebro; Attendance: 1,673; Referees: Leandersson, Lindroos (FIN)
10 March 2013; 15:00	3× (yellow card) 5× (suspension)	Report	3× (yellow card) 3× (suspension)	Gräkjaer Arena, Holstebro; Attendance: 1,673; Referees: Leandersson, Lindroos (FIN)

16 March 2013; 18:00	Wisła Płock (Poland)	30–25	(Norway) Elverum	Orlen Arena, Płock; Attendance: 2,500; Referees: Pandzić, Mosorinski (SRB)
16 March 2013; 18:00	Syprzak 8	(17–14)	Lindboe 9	Orlen Arena, Płock; Attendance: 2,500; Referees: Pandzić, Mosorinski (SRB)
16 March 2013; 18:00	3× (yellow card) 3× (suspension)	Report	3× (yellow card) 2× (suspension)	Orlen Arena, Płock; Attendance: 2,500; Referees: Pandzić, Mosorinski (SRB)

16 March 2013; 20:30	Maribor Branik (Slovenia)	31–27	(Denmark) Tvis Holstebro	Tabor Hall, Maribor; Attendance: 1,700; Referees: Hájek, Macho (CZE)
16 March 2013; 20:30	Razgor 9	(14–12)	Christiansen 7	Tabor Hall, Maribor; Attendance: 1,700; Referees: Hájek, Macho (CZE)
16 March 2013; 20:30	2× (yellow card) 4× (suspension)	Report	3× (yellow card) 4× (suspension)	Tabor Hall, Maribor; Attendance: 1,700; Referees: Hájek, Macho (CZE)

23 March 2013; 17:00	Elverum (Norway)	30–27	(Slovenia) Maribor Branik	Terningen Arena, Elverum; Attendance: 545; Referees: Bounouara, Sami (FRA)
23 March 2013; 17:00	Stegavik 8	(19–15)	Razgor, Svalina 5	Terningen Arena, Elverum; Attendance: 545; Referees: Bounouara, Sami (FRA)
23 March 2013; 17:00	3× (yellow card) 2× (suspension)	Report	3× (yellow card) 5× (suspension)	Terningen Arena, Elverum; Attendance: 545; Referees: Bounouara, Sami (FRA)

24 March 2013; 15:00	Tvis Holstebro (Denmark)	27–26	(Poland) Wisła Płock	Gräkjaer Arena, Holstebro; Attendance: 1,577; Referees: Mata, López (ESP)
24 March 2013; 15:00	Christiansen 8	(12–13)	Kubisztal 9	Gräkjaer Arena, Holstebro; Attendance: 1,577; Referees: Mata, López (ESP)
24 March 2013; 15:00	3× (yellow card) 3× (suspension)	Report	3× (yellow card) 7× (suspension)	Gräkjaer Arena, Holstebro; Attendance: 1,577; Referees: Mata, López (ESP)

=== Group D ===
Team	Pld	W	D	L	GF	GA	GD	Pts
(Germany) Magdeburg	6	5	1	0	176	135	+41	11
(France) Nantes	6	4	1	1	154	143	+11	9
(Turkey) Beşiktaş	6	1	0	5	129	164	−35	2
(Romania) SMD Bacău	6	1	0	5	148	165	−17	2

9 February 2013; 15:00	Magdeburg (Germany)	33–18	(Turkey) Beşiktaş	GETEC Arena, Magdeburg; Attendance: 2,639; Referees: Mata, López (ESP)
9 February 2013; 15:00	Weber 6	(17–6)	Özbahar 5	GETEC Arena, Magdeburg; Attendance: 2,639; Referees: Mata, López (ESP)
9 February 2013; 15:00	3× (yellow card) 4× (suspension)	Report	3× (yellow card) 4× (suspension)	GETEC Arena, Magdeburg; Attendance: 2,639; Referees: Mata, López (ESP)

10 February 2013; 18:45	SMD Bacău (Romania)	18–21	(France) Nantes	Sala Sporturilor Bacau, Bacău; Attendance: 1,800; Referees: Brkić, Jusufhodžić (AUT)
10 February 2013; 18:45	Ghita 4	(9–7)	Skatar 4	Sala Sporturilor Bacau, Bacău; Attendance: 1,800; Referees: Brkić, Jusufhodžić (AUT)
10 February 2013; 18:45	3× (yellow card) 6× (suspension)	Report	2× (yellow card) 5× (suspension)	Sala Sporturilor Bacau, Bacău; Attendance: 1,800; Referees: Brkić, Jusufhodžić (AUT)

16 February 2013; 15:00	Magdeburg (Germany)	33–25	(Romania) SMD Bacău	GETEC Arena, Magdeburg; Attendance: 2,355; Referees: Johansson, Kliko (SWE)
16 February 2013; 15:00	Weber 11	(16–13)	Da Silva Ferreira, Ghita 5	GETEC Arena, Magdeburg; Attendance: 2,355; Referees: Johansson, Kliko (SWE)
16 February 2013; 15:00	3× (yellow card) 3× (suspension)	Report	3× (yellow card) 3× (suspension) 1× (red card)	GETEC Arena, Magdeburg; Attendance: 2,355; Referees: Johansson, Kliko (SWE)

17 February 2013; 17:00	Nantes (France)	31–24	(Turkey) Beşiktaş	Palais des Sports de Beaulieu, Nantes; Attendance: 4,600; Referees: Kouz, Zhoba (UKR)
17 February 2013; 17:00	Nyateu 7	(16–10)	Ladyko, Özbahar 6	Palais des Sports de Beaulieu, Nantes; Attendance: 4,600; Referees: Kouz, Zhoba (UKR)
17 February 2013; 17:00	3× (yellow card) 4× (suspension)	Report	2× (yellow card) 5× (suspension)	Palais des Sports de Beaulieu, Nantes; Attendance: 4,600; Referees: Kouz, Zhoba (UKR)

24 February 2013; 17:00	Nantes (France)	20–27	(Germany) Magdeburg	Palais des Sports de Beaulieu, Nantes; Attendance: 4,200; Referees: Sigurjónsson, Petursson (ISL)
24 February 2013; 17:00	Rivera Folch 7	(8–13)	Grafenhorst, Weber 6	Palais des Sports de Beaulieu, Nantes; Attendance: 4,200; Referees: Sigurjónsson, Petursson (ISL)
24 February 2013; 17:00	3× (yellow card) 3× (suspension)	Report	2× (yellow card) 3× (suspension)	Palais des Sports de Beaulieu, Nantes; Attendance: 4,200; Referees: Sigurjónsson, Petursson (ISL)

24 February 2013; 20:00	SMD Bacău (Romania)	26–24	(Turkey) Beşiktaş	Sala Sporturilor Bacau, Bacău; Attendance: 1,800; Referees: Azemi, Beqiri (Kosovo)
24 February 2013; 20:00	Ramba 7	(15–13)	Döne 9	Sala Sporturilor Bacau, Bacău; Attendance: 1,800; Referees: Azemi, Beqiri (Kosovo)
24 February 2013; 20:00	3× (yellow card) 3× (suspension)	Report	3× (yellow card) 4× (suspension)	Sala Sporturilor Bacau, Bacău; Attendance: 1,800; Referees: Azemi, Beqiri (Kosovo)

9 March 2013; 15:00	Beşiktaş (Turkey)	25–23	(Romania) SMD Bacău	Süleyman Seba Sport Complex, Istanbul; Attendance: 550; Referees: Pavičević, Ražnatović (MNE)
9 March 2013; 15:00	Döne 9	(15–10)	Ghita 9	Süleyman Seba Sport Complex, Istanbul; Attendance: 550; Referees: Pavičević, Ražnatović (MNE)
9 March 2013; 15:00	3× (yellow card) 2× (suspension)	Report	2× (yellow card) 5× (suspension)	Süleyman Seba Sport Complex, Istanbul; Attendance: 550; Referees: Pavičević, Ražnatović (MNE)

9 March 2013; 15:00	Magdeburg (Germany)	26–26	(France) Nantes	GETEC Arena, Magdeburg; Attendance: 2,822; Referees: Kékes, Kékes (HUN)
9 March 2013; 15:00	Kneer, Weber 6	(14–17)	Rivera Folch 7	GETEC Arena, Magdeburg; Attendance: 2,822; Referees: Kékes, Kékes (HUN)
9 March 2013; 15:00	2× (yellow card) 3× (suspension)	Report	3× (yellow card) 5× (suspension)	GETEC Arena, Magdeburg; Attendance: 2,822; Referees: Kékes, Kékes (HUN)

16 March 2013; 17:00	Beşiktaş (Turkey)	17–27	(Germany) Magdeburg	Süleyman Seba Sport Complex, Istanbul; Attendance: 400; Referees: Pandzić, Satordzija (BIH)
16 March 2013; 17:00	three players 4	(9–10)	Musche 7	Süleyman Seba Sport Complex, Istanbul; Attendance: 400; Referees: Pandzić, Satordzija (BIH)
16 March 2013; 17:00	3× (yellow card) 3× (suspension)	Report	3× (yellow card) 6× (suspension)	Süleyman Seba Sport Complex, Istanbul; Attendance: 400; Referees: Pandzić, Satordzija (BIH)

17 March 2013; 17:00	Nantes (France)	32–27	(Romania) SMD Bacău	Palais des Sports de Beaulieu, Nantes; Attendance: 4,500; Referees: Di Domenico, Fornasier (ITA)
17 March 2013; 17:00	Rivera Folch 8	(20–13)	Bondar 6	Palais des Sports de Beaulieu, Nantes; Attendance: 4,500; Referees: Di Domenico, Fornasier (ITA)
17 March 2013; 17:00	3× (yellow card) 7× (suspension)	Report	3× (yellow card) 5× (suspension) 1× (red card)	Palais des Sports de Beaulieu, Nantes; Attendance: 4,500; Referees: Di Domenico, Fornasier (ITA)

23 March 2013; 15:00	Beşiktaş (Turkey)	21–24	(France) Nantes	Süleyman Seba Sport Complex, Istanbul; Attendance: 300; Referees: Baranowski, Lemanowicz (POL)
23 March 2013; 15:00	Özbahar 6	(11–12)	Maqueda, Sayad 6	Süleyman Seba Sport Complex, Istanbul; Attendance: 300; Referees: Baranowski, Lemanowicz (POL)
23 March 2013; 15:00	3× (yellow card) 3× (suspension) 1× (red card)	Report	3× (yellow card) 1× (suspension)	Süleyman Seba Sport Complex, Istanbul; Attendance: 300; Referees: Baranowski, Lemanowicz (POL)

24 March 2013; 18:00	SMD Bacău (Romania)	29–30	(Germany) Magdeburg	Sala Sporturilor Bacau, Bacău; Attendance: 1,500; Referees: Katsikis, Michailidis (GRE)
24 March 2013; 18:00	Ramba 8	(20–16)	Musche 7	Sala Sporturilor Bacau, Bacău; Attendance: 1,500; Referees: Katsikis, Michailidis (GRE)
24 March 2013; 18:00	3× (yellow card) 4× (suspension)	Report	3× (yellow card) 2× (suspension)	Sala Sporturilor Bacau, Bacău; Attendance: 1,500; Referees: Katsikis, Michailidis (GRE)

=== Ranking of second-placed teams ===
The ranking of the second-placed teams was carried out on the basis of the team's results in the group stage, against the first and third placed teams. The results against teams which finished last in the group stage did not count in the ranking system.

Grp	Team	Pld	W	D	L	GF	GA	GD	Pts
C	(Slovenia) Maribor Branik	4	2	1	1	109	106	+3	5
D	(France) Nantes (Note: Nantes finished the group stage among the top three second-placed teams and has qualified directly to the final four tournament, which they will host.)	4	2	1	1	101	98	+3	5
B	(Denmark) Kolding	4	2	0	2	109	97	+12	4
A	(Spain) La Rioja	4	2	0	2	112	107	+5	4
