= 2012–13 EHF Cup =

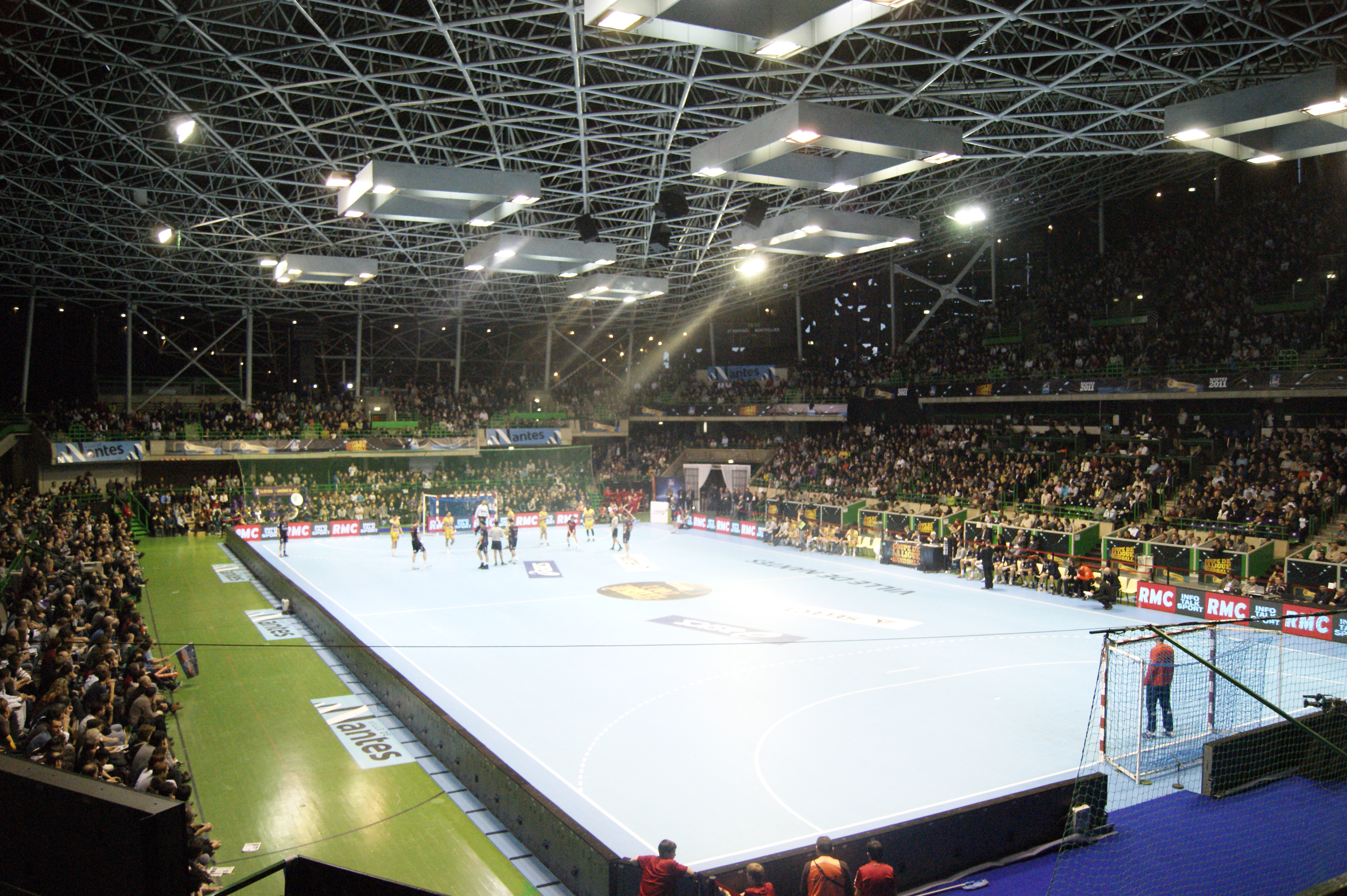
- The Palais des Sports de Beaulieu in Nantes, France, hosted the Final 4 tournament

Tournament details
- Dates: 9 February 2013 – 19 May 2013 (competition proper); 8 September 2012 – 2 December 2012 (qualifying)
- Teams: 16 (competition proper); 75 (total)

Final positions
- Champions: (Germany) Rhein-Neckar Löwen (1st title)
- Runners-up: (France) Nantes

Tournament statistics
- Matches played: 58
- Goals scored: 3,155 (54.4 per match)
- Attendance: 140,197 (2,417 per match)
- Top scorer(s): (Serbia) Momir Rnić (59 goals)

The 2012–13 EHF Cup was the 32nd edition of the EHF Cup and the first edition since the merger of the EHF Cup with the EHF Cup Winners' Cup. The EHF Cup final four tournament was played in Nantes, France, between 18 and 19 May 2013.

== Qualification stage ==
=== Round 1 ===
The table below shows the results of the first round. Teams listed first played at home during the first leg and away during the second leg. Some teams agreed to play both matches in one venue (see: Notes). Highlighted teams qualified into the second round.

Team 1	Agg.	Team 2	1st leg	2nd leg
Sporting (Portugal)	53–59	(Sweden) Ystads IF	27–22	26–37
Borac Banja Luka (Bosnia and Herzegovina)	63–44	(Kosovo) KH BESA Famiglia	31–22	32–22
Haukar Hafnarfjördur (Iceland)	57–31	(Montenegro) RK Mojkovac	32–12	25–19
Winterthur (Switzerland)	48–55	(Portugal) Benfica	21–28	27–27
Maribor Branik (Slovenia)	66–52	(Luxembourg) HB Dudelange	39–24	27–28
HK Lovosice (Czech Republic)	59–56	(Croatia) Zamet	27–23	32–33
Medvedi Perm (Russia)	80–49	(Moldova) PGU-Kartina TV Tiraspol	37–20	43–29^{1}
European University Cyprus	43–61	(Romania) Odorheiu Secuiesc	28–30	15–31
HIT medalp Tirol (Austria)	48–57	(Croatia) Siscia	26–25	22–32
Meshkov Brest (Belarus)	72–42	(Italy) Conversano	38–19	34–23^{2}
Diomidis Argous (Greece)	60–47	(Greece) AEK Athens	30–18	30–29
Tongeren (Belgium)	54–66	(Norway) Elverum	25–26	29–40
Balatonfüred (Hungary)	51–47	(Estonia) HC Kehra	24–22	27–22^{3}
Kristianstad (Sweden)	59–49	(Slovakia) HC Sporta Hlohovec	31–24	28–21
Nilüfer Belediyespor (Turkey)	50–84	(Poland) Stal Mielec	29–42^{4}	21–42
Kumanovo (North Macedonia)	65–46	(Bulgaria) HC Dobrudja	30–20	35–26^{5}
KRAS/Volendam (Netherlands)	51–41	(Switzerland) BSV Bern	26–23	25–18
London GD (United Kingdom)	32–88	(Denmark) Kolding	16–46^{6}	16–42

Notes

- Note 1: The second leg was played in Perm, Russia, with Tiraspol being the official hosts.
- Note 2: The second leg was played in Brest, Belarus, with Conservano being the official hosts.
- Note 3: The second leg was played in Balatonfüred, Hungary, with Kehra being the official hosts.
- Note 4: The first leg was played in Mielec, Poland, with Nilüfer Belediyespor being the official hosts.
- Note 5: The second leg was played in Kumanovo, Macedonia, with Dobrudja being the official hosts.
- Note 6: The first leg was played in Kolding, Denmark, with London GD being the official hosts.

=== Round 2 ===
The table below shows the results of the second round. Teams listed first played at home during the first leg and away during the second leg. Some teams agreed to play both matches in one venue (see: Notes). Highlighted teams qualified into the third round.

Team 1	Agg.	Team 2	1st leg	2nd leg
Odorheiu Secuiesc (Romania)	69–70	(Turkey) Beşiktaş	40–33	29–37
Kristianstad (Sweden)	47–48	(Sweden) Eskilstuna Guif	24–22	23–26
Kumanovo (North Macedonia)	58–61	(Russia) Sungul Snezhinsk	27–26	31–35
KRAS/Volendam (Netherlands)	56–59	(Slovenia) Koper	31–32	25–27
Stal Mielec (Poland)	53–56	(Denmark) Tvis Holstebro	29–26	24–30
Tatabánya (Hungary)	46–59	(Norway) Elverum	23–27	23–32
Madeira (Portugal)	51–62	(Greece) Diomidis Argous	25–30^{7}	26–32
Medvedi Perm (Russia)	66–64	(Switzerland) Wacker Thun	38–32	28–32^{8}
Benfica (Portugal)	72–45	(Italy) SSV Bozen Loacker	32–20	40–25^{9}
Kolding (Denmark)	66–48	(Montenegro) Lovćen	34–17	31–32^{10}
Našice (Croatia)	60–66	(Belarus) Meshkov Brest	30–31	30–35
Siscia (Croatia)	46–45	(Ukraine) Dynamo Poltava	23–24^{11}	23–21
Vardar Skopje (North Macedonia)	60–44	(Czech Republic) HK Lovosice	36–19	24–25
Kópavogs (Iceland)	50–77	(Slovenia) Maribor Branik	25–42^{12}	25–35
Vojvodina (Serbia)	53–52	(Hungary) Balatonfüred	29–25	24–27
Motor Zaporizhzhia (Ukraine)	58–47	(Iceland) Haukar Hafnarfjördur	30–25	28–22^{13}
SMD Bacău (Romania)	51–46	(Sweden) Ystads IF	28–24	23–22^{14}

Notes

- Note 7: The first leg was played in Argos, Greece, with Madeira being the official hosts.
- Note 8: The second leg was played in Perm, Russia, with Wacker Thun being the official hosts.
- Note 9: The second leg was played in Lisbon, Portugal, with Loacker Südtirol being the official hosts.
- Note 10: The second leg was played in Vordingborg, Denmark, with Lovćen being the official hosts.
- Note 11: The first leg was played in Poltava, Ukraine, with Siscia being the official hosts.
- Note 12: The first leg was played in Maribor, Slovenia, with Kópavogs being the official hosts.
- Note 13: The second leg was played in Zaporizhzhia, Ukraine, with Haukar Hafnarfjördur being the official hosts.
- Note 14: The second leg was played in Bacău, Romania, with Ystads IF being the official hosts.

=== Round 3 ===
The table below shows the results of the third round. Teams listed first played at home during the first leg and away during the second leg. Some teams agreed to play both matches in one venue (see: Notes). Highlighted teams qualified into the group stage. The first legs were played on 23–25 November, and the second legs were played on 1 and 2 December 2012.

Team 1	Agg.	Team 2	1st leg	2nd leg
Frisch Auf Göppingen (Germany)	58–41	(Belarus) Meshkov Brest	29–17	29–24
Borac Banja Luka (Bosnia and Herzegovina)	50–66	(Slovakia) Tatran Prešov	25–36	25–30
Siscia (Croatia)	52–64	(Slovenia) Maribor Branik	30–29	22–35
Diomidis Argous (Greece)	44–64	(Germany) Rhein-Neckar Löwen	27–27	17–37
Koper (Slovenia)	51–50	(Portugal) Porto	29–23	22–27
Nantes (France)	51–49	(Portugal) Benfica	29–21	22–28
Tvis Holstebro (Denmark)	67–54	(France) Saint-Raphaël Var	35–19	32–35
Eskilstuna Guif (Sweden)	57–57 (a)	(Spain) Aragón	30–26	27–31
Magdeburg (Germany)	56–55	(North Macedonia) Vardar Skopje	30–27	26–28
La Rioja (Spain)	50–45	(Serbia) Vojvodina	28–19	22–26
SMD Bacău (Romania)	55–44	(Israel) Maccabi Rishon LeZion	33–22	22–22^{15}
Haslum (Norway)	56–57	(Turkey) Beşiktaş	31–20	25–37
Wisła Płock (Poland)	66–47	(Russia) Sungul Snezhinsk	37–23	29–24
Elverum (Norway)	71–51	(Bosnia and Herzegovina) Sloga Doboj	34–24	37–27
Motor Zaporizhzhia (Ukraine)	60–48	(Austria) Alpla HC Hard	27–26	33–22
Kolding (Denmark)	68–54	(Russia) Medvedi Perm	41–24	27–30

- Note 15: The second leg was played in Bacău, Romania, with Maccabi Srugo Rishon Lezion being the official hosts.

== Group stage ==
Location of teams of the 2012–13 EHF Cup group stage.
Red: Group A; Green: Group B; Blue: Group C; Yellow: Group D.

=== Draw and format ===
The draw of the EHF Cup group phase was carried out on Thursday 6 December 2012 in Belgrade, Serbia. The teams were positioned into four pots, with the country protection rule applied: two clubs from the same country may not face each other in the same group. As is standard in EHF club competitions, the seeding is calculated on the basis of the three most recent seasons. Consequently, the results of the seasons 2011–12, 2010–11 and 2009–10 was considered to determine the seeding of the teams for the 2012–13 season. As there was the EHF Cup as well as the EHF Cup Winners' Cup parallel in these last three seasons, the results of both competitions of these seasons were added and then divided by two in order to get the points for the seeding for the 2012–13 season.

The group stage features 16 teams, which were allocated four groups of four. In each group, teams play against each other home-and-away in a round-robin format. The matchdays are 9–10 February, 16–17 February, 23–24 February, 9–10 March, 16–17 March, and 23–24 March 2013. The top two teams from each group qualify for the quarter-finals, which are scheduled in April 2013.

If Nantes, as the organiser of the Final 4 tournament, win their group or finish among top three second ranked teams, they will receive a direct qualification to the Final 4 tournament. In that case only four group winners and two best second ranked team will qualify for the quarter-finals. If the French side wins their group then the other three group winners and the three best second ranked team will qualify for the quarter-finals. If Nantes finish among the top three second ranked teams, the quarter-finals will consist of four group winners and two best second ranked teams. If Nantes finish as the worst second ranked team, they will have to play the quarter-final match. Should the French club rank on the third or fourth position in their group, they will be out of the competition, but they will still organize the Final 4 tournament.

If two or more teams are equal on points on completion of the group matches, the following criteria are applied to determine the rankings (in descending order):

1. number of points in matches of all teams directly involved;
2. goal difference in matches of all teams directly involved;
3. greater number of plus goals in matches of all teams directly involved;
4. goal difference in all matches of the group;
5. greater number of plus goals in all matches of the group;

If no ranking can be determined, a decision shall be obtained by drawing lots. Lots shall be drawn by the EHF, if possible in the presence of a responsible of each club.

Pot 1 (Germany) Frisch Auf Göppingen (Norway) Elverum (Turkey) Beşiktaş (Slovakia) Tatran Prešov	Pot 2 (Denmark) Tvis Holstebro (Slovenia) Koper (Ukraine) Motor Zaporizhzhia (Romania) SMD Bacău	Pot 3 (Poland) Wisła Płock (Germany) Rhein-Neckar Löwen (Sweden) Eskilstuna Guif (Germany) Magdeburg	Pot 4 (Spain) La Rioja (France) Nantes (Denmark) KIF Kolding (Slovenia) Maribor Branik

Key to colours in group tables
Teams that has qualified to the next phase of the competition

=== Group A ===
Team	Pld	W	D	L	GF	GA	GD	Pts	GÖP	LaR	KPR	GUI
(Germany) Frisch Auf Göppingen	6	5	0	1	200	175	+25	10	—	32–31	38–32	37–26
(Spain) La Rioja	6	4	0	2	171	155	+16	8	25–23	—	35–28	29–23
(Slovenia) Koper	6	3	0	3	181	189	−8	6	36–39	25–21	—	30–27
(Sweden) Eskilstuna Guif	6	0	0	6	154	187	−33	0	25–31	24–30	29–30	—

=== Group B ===
Team	Pld	W	D	L	GF	GA	GD	Pts	LÖW	KOL	TAT	ZAP
(Germany) Rhein-Neckar Löwen	6	5	0	1	185	150	+35	10	—	28–25	36–20	35–22
(Denmark) KIF Kolding	6	3	0	3	158	145	+13	6	25–23	—	37–17	25–27
(Slovakia) Tatran Prešov	6	3	0	3	167	184	−17	6	33–34	29–22	—	36–28
(Ukraine) HC Motor Zaporizhzhia	6	1	0	5	150	181	−31	2	25–29	21–24	27–32	—

=== Group C ===
Team	Pld	W	D	L	GF	GA	GD	Pts	HOL	MAR	WIS	ELR
(Denmark) Tvis Holstebro	6	3	2	1	170	157	+13	8	—	26–26	27–26	33–18
(Slovenia) Maribor Branik	6	3	1	2	170	165	+5	7	31–27	—	26–23	34–29
(Poland) Wisła Płock	6	3	0	3	164	158	+6	6	28–29	30–26	—	30–25
(Norway) Elverum	6	1	1	4	155	179	−24	3	28–28	30–27	25–27	—

=== Group D ===
Team	Pld	W	D	L	GF	GA	GD	Pts	MAG	NAN	BEŞ	BAC
(Germany) Magdeburg	6	5	1	0	176	135	+41	11	—	26–26	33–18	33–25
(France) Nantes	6	4	1	1	154	143	+11	9	20–27	—	31–24	32–27
(Turkey) Beşiktaş	6	1	0	5	129	164	−35	2	17–27	21–24	—	25–23
(Romania) SMD Bacău	6	1	0	5	148	165	−17	2	29–30	18–21	26–24	—

=== Ranking of the second-placed teams ===
The ranking of the second-placed teams was carried out on the basis of the team's results in the group stage, against the first and third placed teams. The results against teams which finished last in the group stage did not count in the ranking system.

Grp	Team	Pld	W	D	L	GF	GA	GD	Pts
C	(Slovenia) Maribor Branik	4	2	1	1	109	106	+3	5
D	(France) Nantes (Note: Nantes finished the group stage among the top three second-placed teams and has qualified directly to the final four tournament, which they will host.)	4	2	1	1	101	98	+3	5
B	(Denmark) Kolding	4	2	0	2	109	97	+12	4
A	(Spain) La Rioja	4	2	0	2	112	107	+5	4

== Knockout stage ==
=== Quarter-finals ===
==== Draw and format ====
Because the hosts of the Final 4 tournament, Nantes, finished the group stage among the top three second-placed teams, they have clinched the direct ticket to the final weekend and decided that only three quarter-finals will be played for the remaining spots in the final tournament. The draw of the EHF Cup quarter-finals was carried out on Tuesday 26 March 2013 at the EHF headquarters in Vienna, Austria. Six teams were positioned into two pots with the country protection rule not applied: two clubs from the same country could face each other in the quarter-finals. However, teams from the same group of the group phase cannot face each other. The first pot contained the four group winners and the second pot contained the top two second-placed teams. In the quarter-finals, teams will play against each other over two legs on a home-and-away basis, the team drawn first will play the first leg on the home court.

Pot 1 (Germany) Frisch Auf Göppingen (Germany) Rhein-Neckar Löwen (Denmark) Tvis Holstebro (Germany) Magdeburg	Pot 2 (Slovenia) Maribor Branik (Denmark) Kolding — —

Team 1	Agg.	Team 2	1st leg	2nd leg
KIF Kolding (Denmark)	50–51	(Denmark) Tvis Holstebro	24–24	26–27
Maribor Branik (Slovenia)	56–57	(Germany) Frisch Auf Göppingen	26–26	30–31
Magdeburg (Germany)	51–55	(Germany) Rhein-Neckar Löwen	31–28	20–27

=== Final four ===
Semi-finals
18 May
(Denmark) Tvis Holstebro	20
(France) Nantes	26
18 May
(Germany) Frisch Auf Göppingen	22
(Germany) Rhein-Neckar Löwen	28

Final
19 May
(France) Nantes	24
(Germany) Rhein-Neckar Löwen	26
Third place
19 May
(Denmark) Tvis Holstebro	28
(Germany) Frisch Auf Göppingen	27

== Top goalscorers ==
Rank	Name	Team	Goals
1	(Serbia) Momir Rnić	(Germany) Frisch Auf Göppingen	59
2	(Montenegro) Žarko Marković	(Germany) Frisch Auf Göppingen	55
3	(Denmark) Michael Damgaard Nielsen	(Denmark) Tvis Holstebro	51
3	(Switzerland) Andy Schmid	(Germany) Rhein-Neckar Löwen	51
5	(Norway) Bjarte Myrhol	(Germany) Rhein-Neckar Löwen	48
6	(Croatia) Nikola Špelić	(Slovenia) Maribor Branik	47
7	(Denmark) Mads Christiansen	(Denmark) Tvis Holstebro	43
8	(Austria) Robert Weber	(Germany) Magdeburg	42
8	(Slovenia) Miha Zarabec	(Slovenia) Maribor Branik	42
10	(Denmark) Patrick Wiesmach Larsen	(Denmark) Tvis Holstebro	41

== See also ==
- 2012–13 EHF Champions League
- 2012–13 EHF Challenge Cup
