= Lars T. Jørgensen =

Danish handball player (born 1978)

Lars Troels Jørgensen
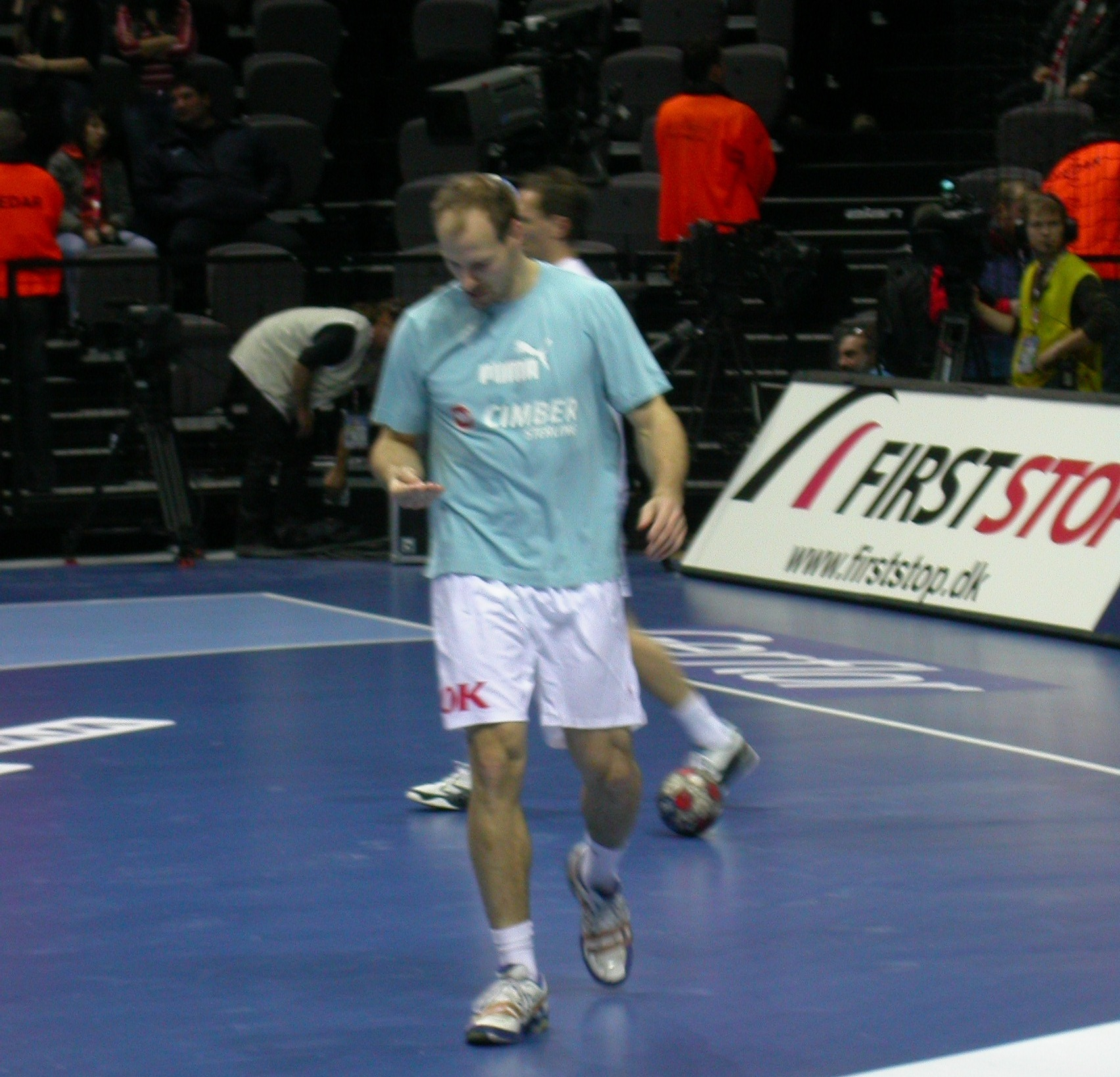

Personal information
- Nationality: Danish
- Born: 3 February 1978 (age 48) Næstved, Denmark
- Height: 1.93 m (6 ft 4 in)

Sport
- Sport: Handball
- Position: Left Back
- Current club: Denmark (assistant coach)

Youth career
- Years: Team
- –: Fladså HK

Senior clubs
- Years: Team
- -2001: Virum-Sorgenfri HK
- 2001-2004: BM Altea
- 2004-2009: Portland San Antonio
- 2009-2012: AG København
- 2012-2017: KIF Kolding København
National team
Years	Team	Apps	(Gls)
1999–2010	Denmark	192	(144)

Teams managed
- 2017–: Denmark (assistant coach)
Medal record
Representing Denmark
Men's handball
World Championships
Bronze medal – third place	2007 Germany	Team competition
European Championships
Gold medal – first place	2008 Norway	Team competition
Bronze medal – third place	2002 Sweden	Team competition
Bronze medal – third place	2004 Slovenia	Team competition
Bronze medal – third place	2006 Switzerland	Team competition

Lars Troels Jørgensen (born 3 February 1978) is a Danish retired handball player and current handball coach. He used to play for the Danish national team and the Spanish clubs SDC San Antonio and BM Altea. Lastly he played for the Danish club KIF Kolding København. He retired in 2017.

Jørgensen was a defensive specialist, especially on the Danish national team.

He won the 2008 European Men's Handball Championship with the Danish national handball team.

== Career ==
Jørgensen started playing handball at Fladså HK with his first professional club being the Copenhagen based Virum-Sorgenfri HK. He debuted in the Danish top flight in 1997, where he won the Danish Championship. In 2001 he joined Spanish side BM Altea, when Virum-Sorgenfri went bankrupt. In 2004 he reached the final of the EHF European League with BM Altea, where they lost to German club THW Kiel. Later the same year he joined Portland San Antonio. Here he won the Spanish Championship in 2005, and reached the final of the 2006 EHF Champions League.

In 2009 he returned to Denmark to join AG København Danish Championship in 2011 and again in 2012. In 2012 he switched to KIF Kolding København after his contract had expired. Here he won the Danish Championship two more times in 2014 and 2015. He retired after the 2016/17 season.

== Post-playing career ==
Immediately after ending his playing career, he became the assistant coach of the Danish women's national team.
