= Ingemar Linnéll =

Swedish handball player and coach (born 1954)

Personal information
- Nationality: Swedish
- Born: 1 September 1954 (age 72) Göteborg, Sweden

Sport
- Sport: Handball

Senior clubs
- Years: Team
- 1974–1978: IK Heim
- 1978–1981: SoIK Hellas
- 1981–1984: IK Heim
- 1984–1985: BK Heid
- 1985–1987: SoIK Hellas
National team
Years	Team	Apps	(Gls)
1976	Sweden	1	(0)

Teams managed
- 1982–1985: BK Heid
- 1987–1991: SoIK Hellas
- 1993–1994: Spårvågens HF (women, assistant)
- 1994–1998: IF Guif
- 1998–2001: KIF Kolding
- 2002–2003: Sweden Junior
- 2004–2008: Sweden
- 2008–2011: KIF Kolding
- 2012–2015: Ricoh HK

Ingemar Linnéll (born 1 September 1954) is a Swedish former handball player and coach. He was the head coach of the Sweden national team from 2004 to 2008.

== Playing career ==
Linnéll started playing handball in IK Heim, where he debuted for the senior team in 1974. Here he helped the team get promoted to the Allsvenskan, the highest tier of Swedish handball. He then played for SoIK Hellas for three years before returning to IK Heim. Here he won the Swedish Championship in 1982 and 1983.

In 1982 he became the head coach of BK Heid, and in 1984-85 he was the player-coach for the club.

He played a single game for the Swedish national team.

Linnéll also played football at Västra Frölunda IF.

== Coaching career ==
He started his coaching career in BK Heid and later coached Soik Hellas. He then coached Spårvägens HF's women's team, followed by IF Guif. From 1998 to 2001, he coached the Danish club KIF Kolding. Here he won the Danish Championship in 2001 and the Danish Cup in 1999.

In 2001 he became the coach for the Sweden U21 National Team. Here he guided to team to gold medals at the 2003 Men's Junior World Handball Championship.

In 2004 he became the head coach of the Sweden senior national team, replacing legendary coach Bengt 'Bengan' Johansson. He signed a contract until 2008. He did not manage to win anything with Sweden, and after failing to qualify for the 2008 Olympics, he did not get his contract extended. He was replaced by Staffan Olsson and Ola Lindgren.

He then returned to KIF Kolding as the sporting director.

In 2012 he returned to Sweden to coach Ricoh HK on a contract until 2015. Afterwards he became the sporting director at the club, leaving the coaching job to Martin Boquist.

== Private ==
He is married to fellow handballer Eja Linnéll. Their three children Jesper (1986), Jonna och Jennie Linnéll (twins, 1988) are also handballers.
