= Boris Schnuchel =

Danish handball player (born 1975)

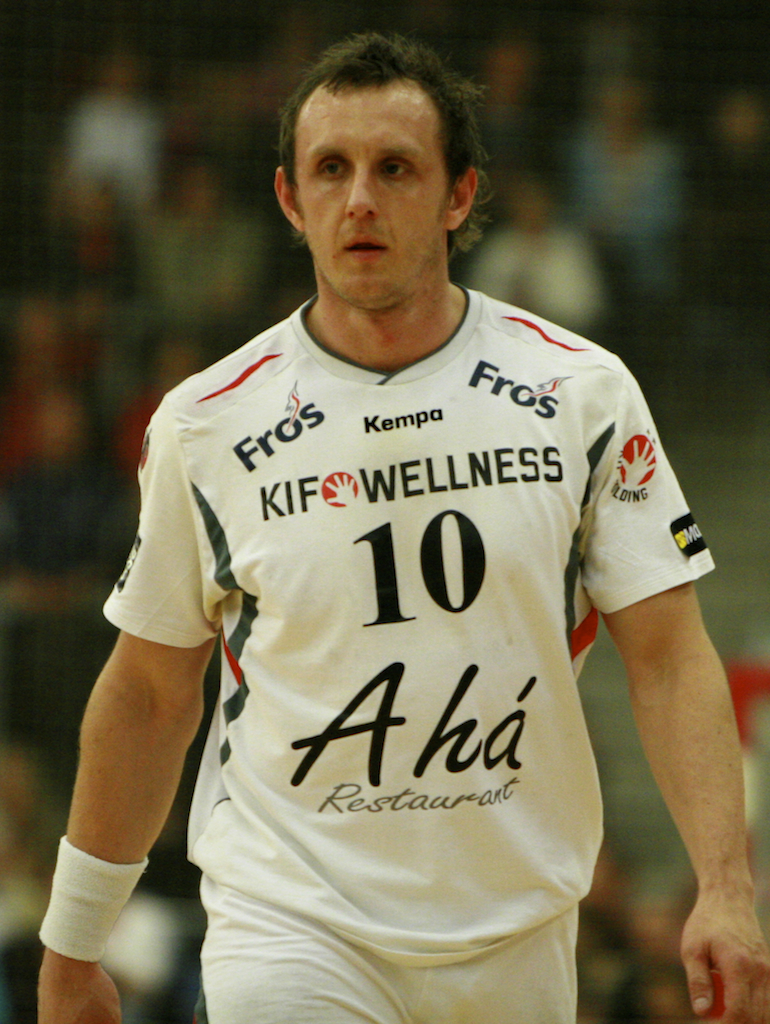
- Boris Schnuchel at a game.

Personal information
- Full name: Boris Schnuchel
- Nationality: Danish (Denmark)
- Born: 15 March 1975 (age 51) Flensburg, Germany
- Height: 1.80 m (5 ft 11 in)

Sport
- Sport: Handball
- Position: Left winger
- Current club: KIF Kolding
- Number: 10

Senior clubs
- Years: Team
- -1997: Over Jerstal
- 1997-2014: KIF Kolding
National team
| Years | Team | Apps | (Gls) |
| 2000-2014 | Denmark | 31 | (84) |

Boris Schnuchel (born 15 March 1975) is a Danish former handballer, who played almost his entire career for Danish Handball League side KIF Kolding from 1997 to his retirement in 2014 and won 7 Danish Championships and 6 Danish Cups. This made him the most winning player in the Danish League history at the time of his retirement. When he retired he also had the club record for most matches with 588 matches for KIF Kolding. A record he held until the 2015/16 season, when he was passed by Bo Spellerberg.

Schnuchel has played 31 matches with the Danish national handball team.

Outside of handball he was the co-owner of Café Kompromis, a café in Kolding and owner of the IT-company dataXpressen.
