= Christian Hjermind =

Danish handball player (born 1973)

Personal information
- Nationality: Danish
- Born: 25 July 1973 (age 53) Copenhagen, Denmark
- Height: 1.85 m (6 ft 1 in)

Sport
- Sport: Handball
- Position: Right wing
- Current club: Retired

Senior clubs
- Years: Team
- -1994: Virum-Sorgenfri HK
- 1994-1996: HIK Håndbold
- 1996-2001: SG Flensburg-Handewitt
- 2001-2003: BM Ciudad Real
- 2003-2007: KIF Kolding
- 2007-2008: BM Ciudad Real
- 2008-2009: KIF Kolding
National team
Years	Team	Apps	(Gls)
1994–2005	Denmark	170	(595)

Teams managed
- 2020-2025: KIF Kolding (director)
Medal record
European Championships
Bronze medal – third place	2002 Sweden
Bronze medal – third place	2004 Slovenia

Christian Hjermind (born 25 July 1973) is a Danish former professional team handball player. Until April 2025 he served as the director of KIF Kolding.

Hjermind played club handball for HIK Håndbold, and was the top goalscorer of the club in the 1995 Danish Handball League season. He moved abroad to play for SG Flensburg-Handewitt in Germany and BM Ciudad Real in Spain. In 1997 he was named Danish handaller of the year. He returned to Denmark to play for KIF Kolding in 2003. He played four seasons with KIF, winning two Danish Handball League championships and two Danish Handball Cup trophies, before moving back to Ciudad Real in 2007.

He represented the Danish national handball team at the 2002 European Championship, winning bronze medals, the 2003 World Championship, the 2004 European Championship, winning bronze medals, and the 2005 World Championship.

== Post-playing career ==
In 2020 he became the director at KIF Kolding, which he had also played for. He was fired after the 2024-25 season, when KIF Kolding finished 14th out of 14 and were relegated for the first time in 41 years.

== Honours ==
- Danish Handball League: 2005, 2006
- Danish Handball Cup: 2005, 2007
