= Ionuț Ramba =

Romanian handball player (born 1991)

Personal information
- Nationality: Romanian
- Born: 8 February 1991 (age 35) Făgăraș, Romania
- Height: 1.98 m (6 ft 6 in)

Sport
- Sport: Handball
- Position: Left back
- Current club: CSM București

Senior clubs
- Years: Team
- –2014: Știința Dedeman Bacău
- 2014–2015: HC Odorhei
- 2015: HC Minaur Baia Mare
- 2015–2017: TBV Lemgo
- 2017–: CSM București
National team
- Years: Team
- –: Romania

Ionuț Ramba (born 8 February 1991) is a Romanian handballer who plays for CSM București and the Romania national team.
