= Bo Spellerberg =

Danish handball player and coach (born 1979)

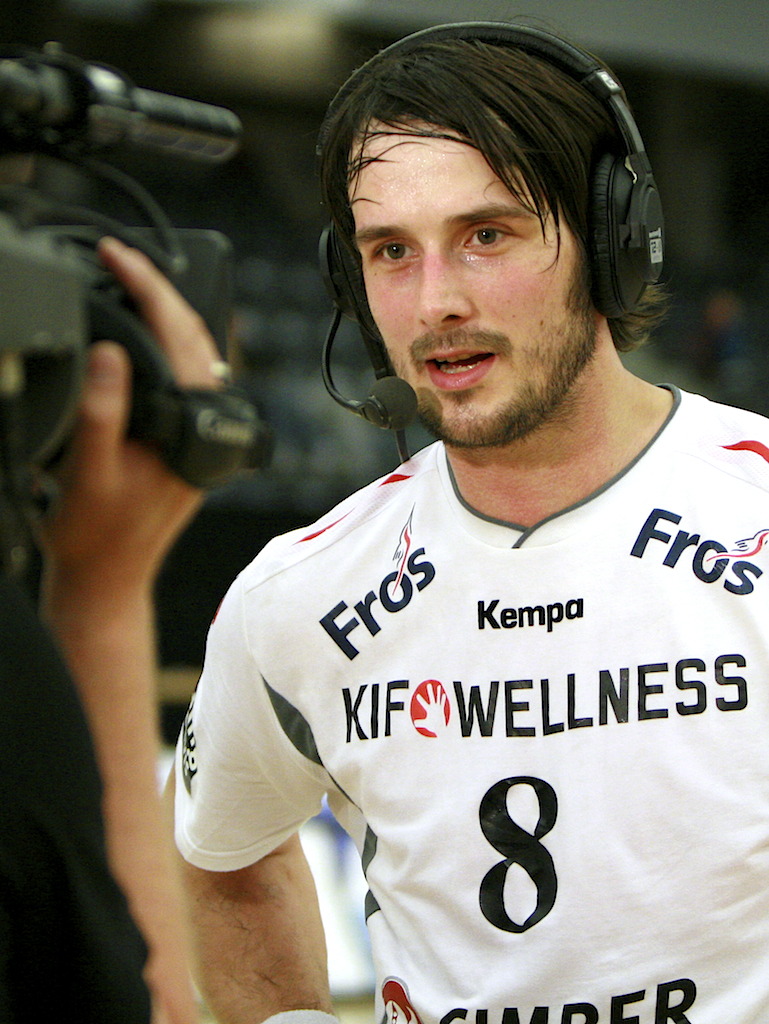

Personal information
- Full name: Bo Dybdal Spellerberg
- Nationality: Danish
- Born: 24 July 1979 (age 47) Gladsaxe, Denmark
- Height: 1.92 m (6 ft 4 in)

Sport
- Sport: Handball
- Position: Manager
- Current club: København Håndbold

Senior clubs
- Years: Team
- 1997–2002: FIF
- 2002–2012: KIF Kolding
- 2008: → CB Cantabria (loan)
- 2012–2018: KIF Kolding København
- 2018–2020: TSV St. Otmar St. Gallen
- 2020–2023: HØJ Elite
National team
Years	Team	Apps	(Gls)
2000–2023	Denmark	245	(332)

Teams managed
- 2018–2020: TSV St. Otmar St. Gallen
- 2020–2023: HØJ Elite (assistant)
- 2023–: København Håndbold
Medal record
Men's Handball
World Championship
Silver medal – second place	2011 Sweden	Team
Silver medal – second place	2013 Spain	Team
Bronze medal – third place	2007 Germany	Team
European Championship
Gold medal – first place	2008 Norway	Team
Gold medal – first place	2012 Serbia	Team
Silver medal – second place	2014 Denmark	Team
Bronze medal – third place	2002 Sweden	Team
Bronze medal – third place	2006 Switzerland	Team
Junior World Championship
Gold medal – first place	1999 Qatar	Team

Bo Spellerberg (born 24 July 1979) is a Danish former handball player and current manager of København Håndbold in the Danish Women's Handball League. He is a two-time European Champion with the Danish national team, after winning both the 2008 and 2012 championships in Norway and Serbia.

In 2011, he also won silver medal at the World Championships in Sweden. He emulated this achievement at the 2013 World Championships in Spain.

== Career ==
Bo Spellerberg started his career with FIF. In 2002 he joined KIF Kolding, where he played until 2018, only interrupted by a short loan in 2008 to Spanish club to CB Cantabria, along with Gábor Császár who played in Viborg HK at the time. The two players were brought in to help the team survive in Liga ASOBAL, during remaining three matches in the 2007–2008 season. CB Cantabria ended the season in 14th place, which meant they survived relegation thanks to a last minute goal from Bo Spellerberg against Ademar León. The club was however dissolved after the season.

With Kolding he won the Danish Championship 6 times and was selected as Danish player of the year in 2006 and 2013. In the 2015-16 season he became the player with the most matches played for the club, taking the record for Boris Schnuchel.

From 2018 to 2020 he was the player-coach at Swiss club TSV St. Otmar St. Gallen. From 2020 to 2023 he was the player-assistant coach for the Danish 1st Division team HØJ Elite. He left the club in November 2023 to become the head coach at first league team København Håndbold.

=== National team ===
He debuted for the Danish national team in 2000. His first major international tournament was the 2002 European Championship. In 2008 he won European gold medals with the Danish team, beating Croatia in the final. This was the first time Denmark won a major international tournament. In 2012 he won another gold medal at the 2012 European Championship in Serbia. In total he played 245 national team matches, scoring 332 goals.
