= KIF Kolding =

Danish handball club

- Full name: Kolding Idrætsforening Håndbold
- Founded: 14 March 1941; 85 years ago
- Arena: Sydbank Arena
- Capacity: 5,100
- President: Christian Phillip
- Head coach: Julie Loop and Anders Eggert
- League: 1st Division
- 2025–26: 1st Division, 2nd of 14 (promotion)

KIF Kolding is a professional handball club based in Kolding, Denmark who competes in the Danish Handball League. KIF Kolding has won the Danish Handball Championship a record 14 times.

It is a part of the broader sports association Kolding Idræts Forening.

== History ==
=== KIF Kolding ===
KIF Handball was formed in 1941 and quickly became a popular feature in the city. In the 1950's a sports venue specifically for handball was built.

It was promoted to the Danish 1st division (the highest league at the time) in 1984 and was relegated again for 41 years.

KIF Kolding won its first Danish Handball Championship in 1987. From 1987 to 2009 KIF won the Danish Handball Championship 12 times. This period was largely defined by a competitive rivalry with GOG, where 8 Danish championships were decided in a final between the two teams.

In 1998 the professional first team became an independent company under the name "Kolding IF Håndbold Elite A/S" in order to better manage the economic risks of being a professional club.

In the summer of 2011 the women team of the club became an independent club called Vejen EH. Vejen EH did however go bankrupt in 2014 and ceased to exists.

=== KIF Kolding København ===
KIF Kolding København was formed in August 2012 after AG København went bankrupt. Some of the players from AG København joined the players from KIF, most notably the national team players, Lars Jørgensen, Kasper Hvidt and Joachim Boldsen. This prompted some of AGK's sponsors to also joined KIF under the new name. KIF Kolding København played some home games in Kolding and some in Brøndby. KIF won the Danish Handball Championship 2 times under the name KIF Kolding København.

=== KIF Kolding ===
On 31 March 2018 KIF announced in a press release, that the club will drop the Copenhagen part of the club and will again be known as KIF Kolding. The national team profiles Lars Jørgensen, Kasper Hvidt and Joachim Boldsen, who all came from AG København, had been able to create interest from fans and sponsors in the capital area, but since they had retired, the number of spectators in Brøndby Hallen had begun to fall as a consequence. This started the debate to focus on Kolding alone.

A new board was established and long time director Jens Boessen stepped down. 9 million DKK was invested into the club and old creditors written off debt of 11 million DKK.

In the 2021-22 season the club was mere 7 seconds from relegation, when Peter Balling secured a draw against TTH Holstebro, which kept them safe. They finished with 19 points, the same amount as relegated TMS Ringsted, but they had a better head-to-head record. The team would continue to be involved in relegation battles the following seasons.

In the 2024-25 season KIF Kolding where relegated after 41 years continuously in the top flight, after finishing last in the regular season. They won a sole 2 matches during the season, gaining 10 points. During the season they fired no less than two head coaches, Sebastian Seifert and Kristian Kristensen. After the season they also fired the director, Christian Hjermind.

A year later they were promoted again, when they finished second behind Skive fH and beat Aarhus Håndbold and HØJ Elite in the relegation play-off.

=== KIF Vamdrup ===
In 2007 KIF Vamdrup was created as union between KIF Kolding and Vamdrup IF, which was intended as a 2nd team for KIF Kolding.

== Rivalries ==
The club has a local rivalry with Fredericia HK. They also have a competitive rivalry with GOG Håndbold.

== Honours ==
- Danish Handball League: 14 (record)
  - Gold:1986–87, 1987–88, 1989–90, 1990–91, 1992–93, 1993–94, 2000–01, 2001–02, 2002–03, 2004–05, 2005–06, 2008–09, 2013–14, 2014–15
- Danish Handball Cup: 8
  - Gold:1989–90, 1993–94, 1998–99, 2001–02, 2004–05, 2006–07, 2007–08, 2012–13
- Double

Winners (4): 1989–90, 1993–94, 2001–02, 2004–05

- Danish Super Cup
  - Gold: 2014, 2015

== Team ==
=== Current squad ===
Squad for the 2026-27 season

Goalkeeper

- 1 (Denmark) Victor Bang
- 12 (Denmark) Rasmus Storm

Wingers
LW

- 4 (Denmark) Lars Skaarup
- 22 (Denmark) Mads Larsson
- 29 (Denmark) Mathias Kragh

RW

- 27 (Denmark) Sebastian Bertelsen
- 28 (Denmark) Andreas Aagren

Line players

- 2 (Denmark) Mads Kragh Thomsen
- 6 (Denmark) Valdemar Hermansen
- 18 (Denmark) Benjamin Pedersen

Back players
LB

- 9 (Denmark) Mads Hoé Jørgensen
- 11 (Denmark) Cornelius Kragh Aastrup

CB

- 7 (Denmark) Hjalte Langmack
- 23 (Sweden) Viktor Ahlstrand

RB

- 23 (Denmark) Kristoffer Vestergaard
- 25 (Denmark) Markus Bugge

=== Transfers ===
Transfers for the 2026–27 season

Joining

- (Denmark) Victor Bang (GK) from (Sweden) IFK Kristianstad
- (Denmark) Rasmus Storm Jensen (GK) from (Denmark) Fredericia HK
- (Denmark) Kristoffer Vestergaard (RB) from (Denmark) Mors-Thy Håndbold
- (Denmark) Mathias Kragh (LW) from (Denmark) Nordsjælland Håndbold
- (Denmark) Valdemar Hermansen (LP) from (Denmark) HC Midtjylland
- (Denmark) Hjalte Langmack (CB) from (Denmark) GOG Håndbold U19

Leaving

- (Denmark) Tobias Ellebæk (LB) to (Denmark) Elitesport Vendsyssel
- (Denmark) Jens Svane Peschardt (CB) to (Austria) Alpla HC Hard
- (Denmark) Thorsten Fries (GK) to (Denmark) SønderjyskE Herrehåndbold
- (Denmark) Emil Tellerup (GK) retires
- (Denmark) Kristian Stoklund (CB) to ?
- (Denmark) Jonas Bruus Tidemand (P) to ?

=== Transfer History ===
Transfers for the 2025–26 season

Joining

- (Denmark) Cornelius Kragh (LB) from (France) Dunkerque Handball
- (Denmark) Thorsten Fries (GK) from (Denmark) Fredericia HK
- (Denmark) Andreas Aagren (RW) (from (Denmark) Skanderborg AGF Håndbold)

Leaving

- (Sweden) Josip Cavar (GK) to (Sweden) Amo Handboll
- (Denmark) Oliver Norlyk (RB) to (Germany) HSV Hamburg
- (Denmark) Lauritz Reinholdt Legér (CB) to (Denmark) Ribe-Esbjerg HH
- (Denmark) Magnus Kronborg (CB) to (Denmark) Skive fH
- (Sweden) Anton Hellberg (GK) (to ?)
- (Portugal) Diogo Silva (RB) (to ?)
- (Denmark) Viktor Nevers (RW) (retires)
- (Denmark) Mathias Hedegaard (P) (retires)
- (Denmark) Victor Lyngsø (P) (to (Denmark) Give HK)

=== Staff ===
Pos.	Name
Head coach	(Denmark) Anders Eggert and Julie Loop
Assistant coach	(Denmark) Kristian Danielsen
Goalkeeper coach	(Denmark) Anders Petersen
Team Leader	(Denmark) Anders Skøtt Bruun
Physiotherapist	(Denmark) Morten U. Olesen

== Notable former players ==
Men

- (Denmark) Bo Spellerberg
- (Denmark) Boris Schnuchel
- (Denmark) Christian Hjermind
- (Denmark) Claus Flensborg
- (Denmark) Henrik Møllgaard
- (Denmark) Jesper Nøddesbo
- (Denmark) Joachim Boldsen
- (Denmark) Kasper Hvidt
- (Denmark) Lars Christiansen
- (Denmark) Lars Krogh Jeppesen
- (Denmark) Lars T. Jørgensen
- (Denmark) Lasse Andersson
- (Denmark) Lasse Boesen
- (Denmark) Magnus Landin Jacobsen
- (Denmark) Rene Toft Hansen
- (Denmark) Torsten Laen
- (Spain) Albert Rocas
- (Spain) Mateo Garralda
- (Spain) Niko Mindegía
- (Spain) Antonio García Robledo
- (Brazil) Fábio Chiuffa
- (Bosnia and Herzegovina) Bilal Šuman
- (Bosnia and Herzegovina) Muhamed Toromanović
- (Serbia) Ratko Nikolić
- (Russia) Konstantin Igropulo
- (Norway) Ole Erevik (2008-2011)
- (Norway) Petter Øverby
- (Sweden) Fredrik Ohlander
- (Sweden) Kim Andersson
- (Sweden) Philip Stenmalm
- (Iceland) Ólafur Stefánsson

== Notable former coaches ==
- (Bosnia and Herzegovina) Bilal Šuman
- (Iceland) Aron Kristjánsson
- (Spain) Antonio Carlos Ortega
- (Sweden) Ingemar Linnéll
- (Denmark) Henrik Kronborg
- (Sweden) Ulf Sivertsson
