= Mads Christiansen =

Danish handballer (born 1986)

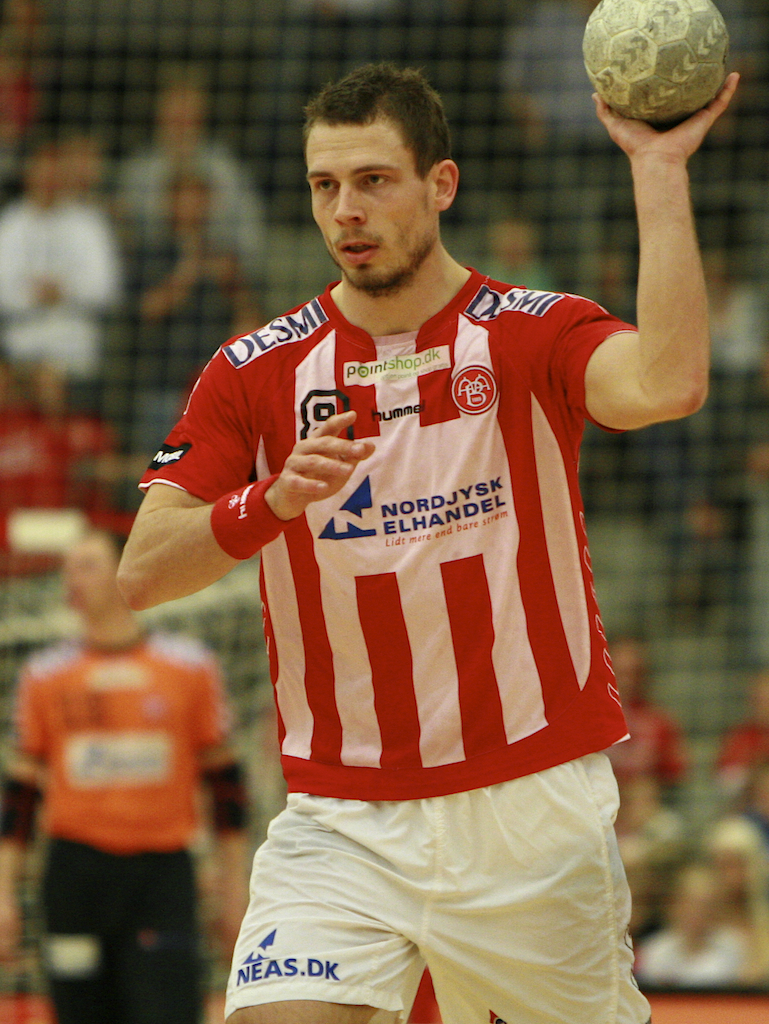

Personal information
- Nationality: Danish
- Born: 3 May 1986 (age 40) Næstved, Denmark
- Height: 1.97 m (6 ft 6 in)

Sport
- Sport: Handball
- Position: Right back
- Current club: Retired

Senior clubs
- Years: Team
- 2004–2006: GOG
- 2006–2008: TMS Ringsted
- 2008–2011: Aalborg Håndbold
- 2011–2013: Team Tvis Holstebro
- 2013–2016: Bjerringbro-Silkeborg
- 2016–2019: SC Magdeburg
- 2019–2021: Aalborg Håndbold
- 2021–2023: Fredericia HK
- 2023–2024: Aarhus HC
National team
Years	Team	Apps	(Gls)
2007–2016	Denmark	117	(257)
Medal record
Olympic Games
Gold medal – first place	2016 Rio de Janeiro	Team
World Championship
Silver medal – second place	2011 Sweden
European Championship
Gold medal – first place	2012 Serbia
Silver medal – second place	2014 Denmark

Mads Christiansen (born 3 May 1986) is a Danish former handballer. He is an Olympics champion from 2016 and a European champion from 2012. He is currently the head of youth development at Danish club Aarhus Håndbold.

== Playing career ==
In 2006 he joined TMS Ringsted from GOG Svendborg. Here he was the club topscorer for both seasons he played there. In 2008 he joined AaB Håndbold. Here he won the Danish championship and Cup in 2010. When the club acquired Johan Jakobsen in 2011 he began to see less playing time, and therefore he joined Team Tvis Holstebro to become a first choice player. Here he was the captain of the team.

In 2013 he joined Bjerringbro-Silkeborg despite having a year left on his contract at TTH. He could use a clause in his contract to leave the club.

In the 2015-16 season he won the Danish championship with Bjerringbro-Silkeborg. In 2014 he joined Qatari club Lekhwiya on a one-month loan deal, where he helped out when the club struggled with injuries.

On 21 October 2015 SC Magdeburg announced that they had signed with Mads Christiansen, and he joined the club on 1 July 2016. Here he played with Danish national team colleagues Jannick Green and Michael Damgaard. In 2017 he extended his contract at the club for one more year. In August 2018 Aalborg Håndbold announced the signing of Mads Christiansen who would return in the summer 2019 on a 3-year deal. Here he won the Danish Championship twice in a row in 2020 and 2021. In 2021 he joined Fredericia HK.

In 2023 he joined Aarhus HC in the Danish 1st Division, the second tier, after his contract at Fredericia HK ran out. He retired a season later.

=== National team ===
He debuted for the Danish national team on 25 October 2007.

His first major international tournament was the 2011 World Championship in Sweden. Here he won a silver medal.

He is European Champion with the Danish national team, after winning the 2012 Championship in Serbia, defeating the host nation in the final, 21–19.

At the 2016 Olympics he won gold medals with the Danish team. This was the first time Denmark won that tournament. After the olympics he retired from the Danish national team.

== Post-playing career ==
In 2024 he became head of talent development at Aarhus Håndbold.

== Honours ==
- Danish Championship:
  - Gold: 2010, 2016, 2020, 2021
- Danish Cup:
  - Gold: 2005
- Danish Super Cup:
  - Gold: 2019, 2020
- DHB-Pokal:
  - Silver: 2019
- EHF Champions League:
  - Silver: 2021
